= The Capitol Years (1998 Frank Sinatra album) =

Box set by Frank Sinatra
- Released: November 10, 1998
- Recorded: 1953–1961
- Genre: Traditional pop
- Length: 13:43:50
- Labels: EMI, Capitol

Frank Sinatra chronology
Frank Sinatra & the Tommy Dorsey Orchestra (1998)	The Capitol Years (1998)	Lucky Numbers (1998)

Professional ratings
Review scores
Source	Rating
AllMusic	5/5 stars

The Capitol Years is a 1998 box set by the American singer Frank Sinatra.

This set was originally assembled by EMI, Capitol's sister company in the United Kingdom. The set contains 21 CDs featuring every album that Sinatra authorized for release between 1953 and 1961 (save for 1956's Frank Sinatra Conducts Tone Poems of Color and 1957's A Jolly Christmas from Frank Sinatra), remastered in 20-bit digital audio. Each CD contains an individual Sinatra Capitol LP (including singles compilations), but the bonus tracks from the American versions appear on a separate CD here as The Rare Sinatra.

The sound quality on this box is arguably superior to American remasters, also produced in 1998 for eight of Sinatra's key albums in the United States.

== Track listing ==
=== Disc one - Songs for Young Lovers (1954) ===
1. "The Girl Next Door" (Hugh Martin, Ralph Blane) – 2:39
2. "They Can't Take That Away from Me" (George Gershwin, Ira Gershwin) – 1:59
3. "Violets for Your Furs" (Tom Adair, Matt Dennis) – 3:07
4. "Someone to Watch over Me" (G. Gershwin, I. Gershwin) – 2:59
5. "My One and Only Love" (Guy Wood, Robert Mellin) – 3:14
6. "Little Girl Blue" (Richard Rodgers, Lorenz Hart) – 2:54
7. "Like Someone in Love" (Jimmy Van Heusen, Johnny Burke) – 3:13
8. "A Foggy Day" (G. Gershwin, I. Gershwin) – 2:41
9. "It Worries Me" (Fritz Schultz-Reichelt, Carl Sigman) – 2:55
10. "I Can Read Between the Lines" (Ramon Getzov, Sid Frank) – 2:50
11. "I Get a Kick Out of You" (Cole Porter) – 2:56
12. "My Funny Valentine" (Rodgers, Hart) – 2:31

=== Disc two - Swing Easy! (1954) ===
1. "Jeepers Creepers" (Harry Warren, Johnny Mercer) – 2:24
2. "Taking a Chance on Love" (Vernon Duke, Ted Fetter, John Latouche) – 2:14
3. "Wrap Your Troubles in Dreams" (Harry Barris, Ted Koehler, Billy Moll) – 2:17
4. "Lean Baby" (Roy Alfred, Billy May) – 2:34
5. "I Love You" (Harry Archer, Harlan Thompson) – 2:28
6. "I'm Gonna Sit Right Down (And Write Myself a Letter)" (Fred E. Ahlert, Joe Young) – 2:29
7. "Get Happy" (Koehler, Harold Arlen)– 2:27
8. "All of Me" (Seymour Simons, Gerald Marks) – 2:08
9. "How Could You Do a Thing Like That to Me" (Tyree Glenn, Allan Roberts) – 2:44
10. "Why Should I Cry over You?" (Chester Conn, Ned Miller) – 2:41
11. "Sunday" (Chester Conn, Benny Krueger, Ned Miller, Jule Styne) – 2:31
12. "Just One of Those Things" (Porter) – 3:14

=== Disc three - In the Wee Small Hours (1955) ===
1. "In the Wee Small Hours of the Morning" (Bob Hilliard, David Mann) – 3:02
2. "Mood Indigo" (Barney Bigard, Duke Ellington, Irving Mills) – 3:32
3. "Glad to Be Unhappy" (Rodgers, Hart) – 2:39
4. "I Get Along Without You Very Well (Except Sometimes)" (Hoagy Carmichael, Jane Brown Thompson) – 3:45
5. "Deep in a Dream" (Eddie DeLange, Van Heusen) – 2:51
6. "I See Your Face Before Me" (Howard Dietz, Arthur Schwartz) – 3:27
7. "Can't We Be Friends?" (Paul James, Kay Swift) – 2:50
8. "When Your Lover Has Gone" (Einar Aaron Swan) – 3:12
9. "What Is This Thing Called Love?" (Porter) – 2:36
10. "Last Night When We Were Young" (Arlen, Yip Harburg) – 3:18
11. "I'll Be Around" (Alec Wilder) – 3:01
12. "Ill Wind" (Arlen, Koehler) – 3:48
13. "It Never Entered My Mind" (Rodgers, Hart) – 2:43
14. "Dancing on the Ceiling" (Rodgers, Hart) – 3:00
15. "I'll Never Be The Same" (Gus Kahn, Matty Malneck, Frank Signorelli) – 3:07
16. "This Love of Mine" (Frank Sinatra, Sol Parker, Henry W. Sanicola Jr.) – 3:35

=== Disc four - This Is Sinatra! (1956) ===
1. "I've Got the World on a String" (Arlen, Koehler) – 2:14
2. "Three Coins in the Fountain" (Styne, Sammy Cahn) – 3:07
3. "Love and Marriage" (Cahn, Van Heusen) – 2:41
4. "From Here to Eternity" (Freddie Karger, Robert Wells) – 3:01
5. "South of the Border" (Jimmy Kennedy, Michael Carr) – 2:52
6. "Rain (Falling from the Skies)" (Mellin, Gunther Finlay) – 3:27
7. "The Gal That Got Away" (Arlen, I. Gershwin) – 3:12
8. "Young at Heart" (Johnny Richards, Carolyn Leigh) – 2:53
9. "Learnin' the Blues" (Dolores Silvers) – 3:04
10. "My One and Only Love" – 3:15
11. "(Love Is) The Tender Trap" (Van Heusen, Cahn) – 3:00
12. "Don't Worry 'bout Me" (Rube Bloom, Koehler) - 3:07

=== Disc five - Songs for Swingin' Lovers (1956) ===
1. "You Make Me Feel So Young" (Josef Myrow, Mack Gordon) – 2:57
2. "It Happened in Monterey" (Mabel Wayne, Billy Rose) – 2:37
3. "You're Getting to Be a Habit with Me" (Warren, Al Dubin) – 2:19
4. "You Brought a New Kind of Love to Me" (Sammy Fain, Irving Kahal, Pierre Norman) – 2:49
5. "Too Marvelous for Words" (Richard A. Whiting, Mercer) – 2:32
6. "Old Devil Moon" (Burton Lane, Harburg) – 3:57
7. "Pennies from Heaven" (Arthur Johnston, Burke)– 2:45
8. "Our Love Is Here to Stay" (G. Gershwin, I. Gershwin) – 2:42
9. "I've Got You Under My Skin" (Porter) – 3:45
10. "I Thought About You" (Van Heusen, Mercer) – 2:31
11. "We'll Be Together Again" (Carl T. Fischer, Frankie Laine) – 4:27
12. "Makin' Whoopee" (Walter Donaldson, Kahn) – 3:08
13. "Swingin' Down the Lane" (Isham Jones, Kahn) – 2:54
14. "Anything Goes" (Porter) – 2:44
15. "How About You?" (Burton Lane, Ralph Freed) – 2:45

=== Disc six - Close to You (1957) ===
1. "Close to You" (Al Hoffman, Carl G. Lampl, Jerry Livingston) – 3:40
2. "P.S. I Love You" (Gordon Jenkins, Mercer) – 4:24
3. "Love Locked Out" (Max Kester, Ray Noble) – 2:45
4. "Everything Happens to Me" (Adair, Dennis) – 3:22
5. "It's Easy to Remember (And So Hard to Forget)" (Rodgers, Hart) – 3:37
6. "Don't Like Goodbyes" (Arlen, Truman Capote) – 4:52
7. "With Every Breath I Take" (Ralph Rainger, Leo Robin) – 3:41
8. "Blame It on My Youth" (Edward Heyman, Oscar Levant) – 3:00
9. "It Could Happen to You" (Burke, Van Heusen) – 3:16
10. "I've Had My Moments" (Donaldson, Kahn) – 3:50
11. "I Couldn't Sleep a Wink Last Night" (Harold Adamson, Jimmy McHugh) – 3:28
12. "The End of a Love Affair" (Edward Redding) – 4:09

=== Disc seven - A Swingin' Affair! (1957) ===
1. "Night and Day" (Porter) – 4:02
2. "I Wish I Were in Love Again" (Rodgers, Hart) – 2:31
3. "I Got Plenty O' Nuttin'" (DuBose Heyward, G. Gershwin, I. Gershwin) – 3:13
4. "I Guess I'll Have to Change My Plan" (Schwartz, Dietz) – 2:26
5. "Nice Work if You Can Get It" (G. Gershwin, I. Gershwin) – 2:24
6. "Stars Fell on Alabama" (Frank Perkins, Mitchell Parish) – 2:41
7. "No One Ever Tells You" (Hub Atwood, Carroll Coates) – 3:28
8. "I Won't Dance" (Jerome Kern, McHugh, Oscar Hammerstein II, Otto Harbach, Dorothy Fields) – 3:27
9. "The Lonesome Road" (Nathaniel Shilket, Gene Austin) – 3:57
10. "At Long Last Love" (Porter) – 2:27
11. "You'd Be So Nice to Come Home To" (Porter) – 2:07
12. "I Got It Bad (And That Ain't Good)" (Ellington, Paul Francis Webster) – 3:25
13. "From This Moment On" (Porter) – 3:56
14. "If I Had You" (Jimmy Campbell, Reginald Connelly, Ted Shapiro) – 2:39
15. "Oh! Look at Me Now" (Joe Bushkin, John DeVries) – 2:50

=== Disc eight - Where Are You? (1957) ===
1. "Where Are You?" (Harold Adamson, Jimmy McHugh) – 3:30
2. "The Night We Called It a Day (Dennis, Adair) – 3:27
3. "I Cover the Waterfront" (Johnny Green, Edward Heyman) – 2:59
4. "Maybe You'll Be There" (Bloom, Sammy Gallop) – 3:06
5. "Laura" (Mercer, David Raksin) – 3:27
6. "Lonely Town" (Leonard Bernstein, Betty Comden, Adolph Green) – 4:11
7. "Autumn Leaves" (Jacques Prévert, Mercer, Joseph Kosma) – 2:51
8. "I'm a Fool to Want You" (Sinatra, Jack Wolf, Joel Herron) – 4:50
9. "I Think of You" (Jack Elliott, Don Marcotte) – 3:03
10. "Where Is the One?" (Wilder, Edwin Finckel)- 3:12
11. "There's No You" (Adair, Hal Hopper) - 3:45
12. "Baby Won't You Please Come Home" (Charles Warfield, Clarence Williams) - 2:57

=== Disc nine - Come Fly with Me (1958) ===
1. "Come Fly with Me" (Cahn, Van Heusen) – 3:18
2. "Around the World" (Victor Young, Adamson) – 3:20
3. "Isle of Capri" (Will Grosz, Jimmy Kennedy) – 2:29
4. "Moonlight in Vermont" (Karl Suessdorf, John Blackburn) – 3:31
5. "Autumn in New York" (Duke) – 4:36
6. "On the Road to Mandalay" (Oley Speaks, Rudyard Kipling) – 3:29
7. "Let's Get Away from It All" (Dennis, Adair) – 2:10
8. "April in Paris" (Duke, Harburg) – 2:50
9. "London By Night" (Carroll Coates) – 3:30
10. "Brazil" (Ary Barroso, Bob Russell) – 2:55
11. "Blue Hawaii" (Rainger, Robin) – 2:43
12. "It's Nice to Go Trav'ling" (Cahn, Van Heusen) – 3:49

=== Disc ten - This Is Sinatra Volume 2 (1958) ===
1. "Hey! Jealous Lover" (Cahn, Kay Twomey, Bee Walker) – 2:24
2. "Everybody Loves Somebody" (Irving Taylor, Ken Lane) – 3:46
3. "Something Wonderful Happens in Summer" (Bushkin, Devries) – 3:16
4. "Half as Lovely (Twice as True)" (Lew Spence, Gallop) – 3:09
5. "You're Cheatin' Yourself (If You're Cheatin' on Me)" (Hoffman, Dick Manning) – 2:38
6. "You'll Always Be the One I Love" (Ticker Freeman, Sunny Skylar) – 2:59
7. "You Forgot All the Words (While I Still Remember the Tune)" (Bernie Wayne, E.H. Jay) – 3:24
8. "(How Little It Matters) How Little We Know" (Phillip Springer, Leigh) – 2:44
9. "Time After Time" (Styne, Cahn) - 3:31
10. "Crazy Love" (Cahn, Phil Tuminello) - 2:54
11. "Wait for Me" (Nelson Riddle, Stanford) - 2:54
12. "If You Are But a Dream" (Moe Jaffe, Jack Fulton, Nat Bonx) – 3:58
13. "So Long, My Love" (Cahn, Spence) – 2:50
14. "It's the Same Old Dream" (Styne, Cahn) – 3:06
15. "I Believe" (Styne, Cahn) – 2:33
16. "Put Your Dreams Away (For Another Day)" (Paul Mann, George David Weiss, Ruth Lowe) – 3:12

=== Disc eleven - Only the Lonely (1958) ===
1. "Only the Lonely" (Cahn, Van Heusen) - 4:10
2. "Angel Eyes" (Dennis, Earl Brent) - 3:46
3. "What's New?" (Bob Haggart, Burke) - 5:13
4. "It's a Lonesome Old Town" (Harry Tobias, Charles Kisco) - 4:18
5. "Willow Weep for Me" (Ann Ronell) - 4:19
6. "Goodbye" (Gordon Jenkins) - 5:45
7. "Blues in the Night" (Arlen, Mercer) - 4:44
8. "Guess I'll Hang My Tears Out to Dry" (Cahn, Styne) - 4:00
9. "Ebb Tide" (Robert Maxwell, Carl Sigman) - 3:18
10. "Spring is Here" (Rodgers, Hart) - 4:47
11. "Gone with the Wind" (Allie Wrubel, Herb Magidson) - 5:15
12. "One for My Baby (and One More for the Road)" (Arlen, Mercer) - 4:23

=== Disc twelve - Come Dance with Me! (1959) ===
1. "Come Dance with Me" (Cahn, Van Heusen) – 2:31
2. "Something's Gotta Give" (Mercer) – 2:38
3. "Just in Time" (Styne, Comden, Green) – 2:24
4. "Dancing in the Dark" (Schwartz, Dietz) – 2:26
5. "Too Close for Comfort" (Jerry Bock, Larry Holofcener, Weiss) – 2:34
6. "I Could Have Danced All Night" (Alan Jay Lerner, Frederick Loewe) – 2:40
7. "Saturday Night (Is the Loneliest Night of the Week)" (Cahn, Styne) – 1:54
8. "Day In, Day Out" (Bloom, Mercer) – 3:25
9. "Cheek to Cheek" (Irving Berlin) – 3:06
10. "Baubles, Bangles and Beads" (Robert Wright, George Forrest) – 2:46
11. "The Song Is You" (Kern, Hammerstein) – 2:43
12. "The Last Dance" (Cahn, Van Heusen) – 2:11

=== Disc thirteen - No One Cares (1959) ===
1. "When No One Cares" (Cahn, Van Heusen) – 2:42
2. "A Cottage for Sale" (Larry Conley, Willard Robison) – 3:16
3. "Stormy Weather" (Arlen, Ted Koehler) – 3:20
4. "Where Do You Go?" (Arnold Sundgaard, Wilder) – 2:34
5. "I Don't Stand a Ghost of a Chance with You" (Bing Crosby, Ned Washington, Young) – 3:16
6. "Here's That Rainy Day" (Burke, Van Heusen) – 3:34
7. "I Can't Get Started" (Duke, I. Gershwin) – 4:01
8. "Why Try to Change Me Now?" (Cy Coleman, Joseph Allan McCarthy) – 3:41
9. "Just Friends" (John Klenner, Sam M. Lewis) – 3:40
10. "I'll Never Smile Again" (Lowe) – 3:46
11. "None But the Lonely Heart" (Pyotr Il'yich Tchaikovsky, Bill Westbrook) – 3:41
12. "The One I Love (Belongs to Somebody Else)" (Jones, Kahn) – 3:05

=== Disc fourteen - Look to Your Heart (recorded 1953–1955, released 1959) ===
1. "Look to Your Heart" (Cahn, Van Heusen) – 3:10
2. "Anytime, Anywhere" (Imogen Carpenter, Lenny Adelson) – 2:45
3. "Not as a Stranger" (Van Heusen, Buddy Kaye) – 2:47
4. "Our Town" (Cahn, Van Heusen) – 3:16
5. "You, My Love" (Van Heusen, Gordon) – 2:56
6. "Same Old Saturday Night" (Frank Reardon, Cahn) – 2:31
7. "Fairy Tale" (Jay Livingston, Stanford) – 2:59
8. "The Impatient Years" (Cahn, Van Heusen) – 3:14
9. "I Could Have Told You" (Carl Sigman, Van Heusen) – 3:18
10. "When I Stop Loving You" (George Cates, Alan Copeland, Mort Greene) – 2:56
11. "If I Had Three Wishes" (Claude Baum, Spence) – 2:56
12. "I'm Gonna Live Till I Die" (Hoffman, Walter Kent, Mann Curtis) – 1:54

=== Disc fifteen - Nice 'n' Easy (1960) ===
1. "Nice 'n' Easy" (Alan Bergman, Marilyn Keith, Spence) – 2:45
2. "That Old Feeling" (Lew Brown, Fain) – 3:33
3. "How Deep Is The Ocean?" (Berlin) – 3:15
4. "I've Got a Crush on You" (G. Gershwin, I. Gershwin) – 2:16
5. "You Go To My Head" (J. Fred Coots, Haven Gillespie) – 4:28
6. "Fools Rush In (Where Angels Fear to Tread)" (Bloom, Mercer) – 3:22
7. "Nevertheless (I'm in Love with You)" (Bert Kalmar, Harry Ruby) – 3:18
8. "(I Got A Woman Crazy For Me) She's Funny That Way" (Neil Moret, Richard A. Whiting) – 3:55
9. "Try a Little Tenderness" (Jimmy Campbell, Reginald Connelly, Harry M. Woods) – 3:22
10. "Embraceable You" (G. Gershwin, I. Gershwin) – 3:24
11. "Mam'selle" (Gordon, Edmund Goulding) – 2:48
12. "Dream" (Mercer) – 2:57

=== Disc sixteen - Come Swing with Me! (1961) ===
1. "Day by Day" (Axel Stordahl, Paul Weston, Cahn) – 2:39
2. "Sentimental Journey" (Brown, Ben Homer, Bud Green) – 3:26
3. "Almost Like Being in Love" (Loewe, Lerner) – 2:02
4. "Five Minutes More" (Cahn, Styne) – 2:36
5. "American Beauty Rose" (Mack David, Redd Evans, Arthur Altman) – 2:22
6. "Yes Indeed!" (Sy Oliver) – 2:35
7. "On the Sunny Side of the Street" (McHugh, Fields) – 2:42
8. "Don't Take Your Love from Me" (Henry Nemo) – 1:59
9. "That Old Black Magic" (Arlen, Mercer) – 4:05
10. "Lover" (Rodgers, Hart) – 1:53
11. "Paper Doll" (Johnny S. Black) – 2:08
12. "I've Heard That Song Before" (Cahn, Styne) – 2:33

=== Disc seventeen - All the Way (1961) ===
1. "All the Way" (Cahn, Van Heusen) – 2:55
2. "High Hopes" (Cahn, Van Heusen) – 2:43
3. "Talk to Me" (Eddie Snyder, Stanley Kahan, Rudy Vallee) – 3:04
4. "French Foreign Legion" (Aaron Schroeder, Guy Wood) – 2:03
5. "To Love and Be Loved" (Cahn, Van Heusen) – 3:53
6. "River, Stay 'Way from My Door" (Matt Dixon, Harry M. Woods) – 2:39
7. "Witchcraft" (Coleman, Leigh) – 2:54
8. "It's Over, It's Over, It's Over" (Dennis, Stanford) – 2:42
9. "Old McDonald Had a Farm" (Traditional, Bergman, Keith, Spence) – 2:42
10. "This Was My Love" (Jim Harbert) – 3:28
11. "All My Tomorrows" (Cahn, Van Heusen) – 3:15
12. "Sleep Warm" (Bergman, Keith, Spence) – 2:43

=== Disc eighteen - Sinatra's Swingin' Session!!! (1961) ===
1. "When You're Smiling" (Mark Fisher, Joe Goodwin, Larry Shay) – 2:00
2. "Blue Moon" (Rodgers, Hart) – 2:51
3. "S'Posin" (Paul Denniker, Andy Razaf) – 1:48
4. "It All Depends on You" (B.G. DeSylva, Brown, Ray Henderson) – 2:02
5. "It's Only a Paper Moon" (Arlen, Harburg, Rose) – 2:19
6. "My Blue Heaven" (Donaldson, George A. Whiting) – 2:03
7. "Should I?" (Arthur Freed, Nacio Herb Brown) – 1:30
8. "September in the Rain" (Warren, Dubin) – 2:58
9. "Always" (Berlin) – 2:17
10. "I Can't Believe That You're in Love with Me" (Clarence Gaskill, McHugh) – 2:25
11. "I Concentrate on You" (Porter) – 2:23
12. "You Do Something to Me" (Porter) – 1:33

=== Disc nineteen - Point of No Return (1962) ===
1. "(Ah, the Apple Trees) When the World Was Young" (Mercer, M. Philippe-Gerard, Angele Marie T. Vannier) - 3:48
2. "I'll Remember April" (Don Raye, Gene de Paul, Patricia Johnston) - 2:50
3. "September Song" (Kurt Weill, Maxwell Anderson) - 4:21
4. "A Million Dreams Ago" (Lou Quadling, Eddie Howard, Dick Jurgens) - 2:41
5. "I'll See You Again" (Noël Coward) - 2:44
6. "There Will Never Be Another You" (Gordon, Warren) - 3:09
7. "Somewhere Along the Way" (Kurt Adams, Gallop) - 3:01
8. "It's a Blue World" (Bob Wright, Chet Forrest) - 2:49
9. "These Foolish Things (Remind Me of You)" (Jack Strachey, Harry Link, Holt Marvell) - 3:59
10. "As Time Goes By" (Herman Hupfeld) - 3:17
11. "I'll Be Seeing You" (Fain, Irving Kahal) - 2:47
12. "Memories of You" (Eubie Blake, Razaf) - 3:53

=== Disc twenty - Sinatra Sings of Love and Things (1962) ===
1. "The Nearness of You" (Hoagy Carmichael, Washington) - 2:44
2. "Hidden Persuasion" (Wainwright Churchill III) - 2:26
3. "The Moon Was Yellow" (Fred E. Ahlert, Edgar Leslie) - 3:02
4. "I Love Paris" (Porter) - 1:52
5. "Monique" (Cahn, Elmer Bernstein) - 3:18
6. "Chicago" (Fred Fisher) - 2:12
7. "Love Looks So Well On You" (Spence, Keith, Bergman) - 2:41
8. "Sentimental Baby" (Spence, Keith, Bergman) - 2:38
9. "Mr. Success" (Frank Sinatra, Edwin Grienes, Sanicola) - 2:42
10. "They Came to Cordura" (Cahn, Van Heusen) - 3:02
11. "I Gotta Right to Sing the Blues" (Arlen, Koehler) - 3:00
12. "Something Wonderful Happens In Summer" - 3:12

=== Disc twenty-one - The Rare Sinatra (1978) ===
1. "Day In, Day Out" – 3:20
2. "I'm Walking Behind You" (Billy Reid) – 2:58
3. "Don't Make a Beggar of Me" (Al Sherman) – 3:04
4. "Ya Better Stop" (Cliff Ferre, Mark McIntyre) – 2:36
5. "Take a Chance" (David Raksin, Don Stanford) – 2:40
6. "Day In, Day Out" – 3:08
7. "Memories of You" (E. Blake, A. Razaf) – 2:54
8. "If It's the Last Thing I Do" (Cahn, Saul Chaplin) – 4:00
9. "There's a Flaw in My Flue" (Burke, Van Heusen) – 2:41
10. "Wait till You See Her" (Rodgers, Hart) – 3:10
11. "Nothing in Common" (Van Heusen, Cahn) – 2:33
12. "Same Old Song and Dance" (Van Heusen, Cahn, Bobby Worth) – 2:54
13. "How Are Ya' Fixed for Love?" (Van Heusen, Cahn) – 2:28
14. "Where or When" (Rodgers, Hart) – 2:29
15. "It All Depends on You" – 2:04
16. "I Couldn't Care Less" (Van Heusen, Cahn) – 3:02
17. "The Song Is You" – 2:57
18. "The One I Love (Belongs to Somebody Else)" – 3:06

== Personnel ==
- Frank Sinatra – vocals
