= The Complete Capitol Singles Collection =

Box set by Frank Sinatra
- Released: September 3, 1996
- Recorded: April 2, 1953 – September 12, 1961
- Genre: Traditional pop
- Label: Capitol
- Producer: Brad Benedict

Frank Sinatra chronology
Frank Sinatra Sings the Select Sammy Cahn (1996)	The Complete Capitol Singles Collection (1996)	Frank Sinatra with the Red Norvo Quintet: Live in Australia, 1959 (1997)

Professional ratings
Review scores
Source	Rating
AllMusic	4.5/5 stars

The Complete Capitol Singles Collection is a compact disc box set by the American singer Frank Sinatra, released on Capitol Records in 1996. The four-disc set contains all 45 singles released by Sinatra during his tenure at the label between 1953 and 1961. It does not include releases specifically for jukeboxes or for extended play singles, with one exception. The original tapes were digitally remastered by Bob Norberg.

== Content ==
The packaging includes many photographs, detailed session notes, and a long essay by Will Friedwald, who explains that Sinatra followed a "singles aesthetic" that set these songs quite apart from the "concept" albums he was recording at Capitol simultaneously. Of the 96 tracks included in the box, six were not Sinatra singles. "Well, Did You Evah!", a duet with Bing Crosby, is the b-side to Capitol single 3507A "True Love" by Bing Crosby and Grace Kelly. The five others are tracks 23 through 27 on disc four: "Look to Your Heart" appeared on an EP single released to promote the 1955 television production of Our Town with Sinatra cast as the stage manager; two appeared on compilation albums; two others were introduced on this set.

Several songs are duets with other artists. "How Are Ya' Fixed for Love" and its flip "Nothing in Common" present Sinatra with Keely Smith, the usual singing partner of Louis Prima. The Pied Pipers, whom Sinatra had worked alongside while with Tommy Dorsey, appear with their new singer June Hutton on "Don't Change Your Mind About Me". Celeste Holm appears on "Who Wants to Be a Millionaire?"; those two songs along with the aforementioned Crosby duet "Well, Did You Evah!", "Mind if I Make Love to You?", and "You're Sensational" also appear in the 1956 film High Society. A doo-wop vocal group, the Nuggets, provide vocal backing for his rock and roll single "Two Hearts, Two Kisses", and the Ralph Brewster Singers are credited for the holiday single "The Christmas Waltz" with "Mistletoe and Holly".

Most tracks were arranged by Sinatra's mainstay while at Capitol, Nelson Riddle; exceptions are listed below. Orchestras consisting of Los Angeles session musicians were conducted by Riddle, with the following exceptions: "Lean Baby", "I'm Walking Behind You", and "I'll Remember April" conducted by Axel Stordahl; "Melody of Love" and "I'm Gonna Live Till I Die" conducted by Ray Anthony; "Well, Did You Evah!", "Mind if I Make Love to You?", and "Who Wants to Be a Millionaire?" conducted by Johnny Green; "The Christmas Waltz" and "Mistletoe and Holly" conducted by Gordon Jenkins; "How Are Ya' Fixed for Love", "Nothing in Common", "The Same Old Song and Dance", "Sentimental Journey", "American Beauty Rose", "I've Heard That Song Before", and "Five Minutes More" conducted by Billy May; and "Monique" conducted by Felix Slatkin.

== Select personnel ==
- Frank Sinatra — vocals
- Bing Crosby, June Hutton, Keely Smith, The Nuggets, The Ralph Brewster Singers — vocals
- Bill Miller — piano
- Alvin Stoller — drums
- Nelson Riddle — principal arranger
- Heinie Beau — arranger (♣ on disc four)
- Billy May — arranger (♦ on disc four)
- Voyle Gilmore, Dave Cavanaugh — producers

== Track listing ==
=== Disc one ===
1. "Lean Baby" (Roy Alfred, Billy May) - 2:33
2. "I'm Walking Behind You" (Billy Reid) - 2:58
3. "I've Got the World on a String" (Ted Koehler, Harold Arlen) - 2:14
4. "My One and Only Love" (Guy Wood, Robert Mellin) - 3:14
5. "Anytime, Anywhere" (Imogen Carpenter, Leonard Adelson) - 2:45
6. "From Here to Eternity" (Freddie Karger, Robert Wells) - 3:01
7. "I Love You" (Harry Archer, Harlan Thompson) - 2:28
8. "South of the Border" (Jimmy Kennedy, Michael Carr) - 2:52
9. "Take a Chance" (David Raksin, Don Stanford) - 2:40
10. "Young at Heart" (Johnny Richards, Carolyn Leigh) - 2:53
11. "Don't Worry 'bout Me" (Koehler, Rube Bloom) - 3:08
12. "I Could Have Told You" (Carl Sigman, Jimmy Van Heusen) - 3:07
13. "Rain (Falling from the Skies)" (Robert Mellin, Gunther Finlay) - 3:27
14. "Three Coins in the Fountain" (Sammy Cahn, Jule Styne) - 3:07
15. "The Gal That Got Away" (Ira Gershwin, Arlen) - 3:12
16. "Half as Lovely (Twice as True)" (Lew Spence, Sammy Gallop) - 3:09
17. "It Worries Me" (Fritz Schulz-Reichel, Sigman) - 2:55
18. "When I Stop Loving You" (George Cates, Alan Copeland, Mort Greene) - 2:56
19. "White Christmas" (Irving Berlin) - 2:37
20. "The Christmas Waltz" (Cahn, Styne) - 3:03
21. "Someone to Watch Over Me" (I. Gershwin, George Gershwin) - 2:59
22. "You, My Love" (Van Heusen, Mack Gordon) - 2:56

=== Disc two ===
1. "Melody of Love" (Hans Engelmann, Tom Glazer) - 3:02
2. "I'm Gonna Live Till I Die" (Mann Curtis, Al Hoffman, Walter Kent) - 1:54
3. "Why Should I Cry over You?" (Chester Conn, Ned Miller) - 2:41
4. "Don't Change Your Mind About Me" (Imogen Carpenter, Leonard Adelson) - 2:44
5. "Two Hearts, Two Kisses (Make One Love)" (Henry Stone, Otis Williams) - 2:23
6. "From the Bottom to the Top" (Gee Wilson) - 2:22
7. "If I Had Three Wishes" (Claude Baum, Spence) - 2:56
8. "Learnin' the Blues" (Dolores Silvers) - 3:04
9. "Not as a Stranger" (Van Heusen, Buddy Kaye) - 2:47
10. "How Could You Do a Thing Like That to Me?" (Tyree Glenn, Allan Roberts) - 2:44
11. "Same Old Saturday Night" (Cahn, Frank Reardon) - 2:31
12. "Fairy Tale" (Jay Livingston, Stanford) - 2:59
13. "Love and Marriage" (Cahn, Van Heusen) - 2:41
14. "The Impatient Years" (Cahn, Van Heusen) - 3:14
15. "(Love Is) The Tender Trap" (Cahn, Van Heusen) - 3:00
16. "Weep They Will" (Bill Carey, Carl T. Fischer) - 3:19
17. "You'll Get Yours" (Van Heusen, Stanford) - 2:28
18. "Flowers Mean Forgiveness" (Maxwell Anderson, Kurt Weill) - 3:07
19. "(How Little It Matters) How Little We Know" (Phillip Springer, Leigh) - 3:23
20. "Five Hundred Guys" (David Cantor, Irving Kosloff) - 2:50
21. "Wait for Me" (Theme from Johnny Concho) (Nelson Riddle, Stanford) - 2:54
22. "You're Sensational" (Cole Porter) - 3:54
23. "Well, Did You Evah!" (Porter) - 3:46

=== Disc three ===
1. "Mind if I Make Love to You? (Porter) - 2:24
2. "Who Wants to Be a Millionaire?" (Porter) - 2:07
3. "You Forgot All the Words (While I Still Remember the Tune)" (Eve Hay, Bernie Wayne) - 3:20
4. "Hey! Jealous Lover" (Cahn, Kay Twomey, Bee Walker) - 2:24
5. "Your Love for Me" (Barry Parker) - 2:59
6. "Can I Steal a Little Love?" (Phil Tuminello) - 2:32
7. "So Long, My Love" (Cahn, Spence) - 2:50
8. "Crazy Love" (Cahn, Tuminello) - 2:54
9. "Something Wonderful Happens in Summer" (Joe Bushkin, John DeVries) - 3:16
10. "You're Cheatin' Yourself (If You're Cheatin' on Me)" (Hoffman, Dick Manning - 2:38
11. "All the Way" (Cahn, Van Heusen) - 2:55
12. "Chicago" (Fred Fisher) - 2:12
13. "Witchcraft" (Cy Coleman, Leigh) - 2:54
14. "Tell Her You Love Her" (Hugh Halliday, Homer Denison, Barry Parker) - 3:01
15. "The Christmas Waltz" (Cahn, Van Heusen) - 3:04
16. "Mistletoe and Holly" (Hank Sanicola, Frank Sinatra, Stanford)
17. "Nothing in Common" (Cahn, Van Heusen) - 2:31
18. "How Are Ya' Fixed for Love?" (Cahn, Van Heusen) - 2:26
19. "Same Old Song and Dance" (Cahn, Van Heusen, Bobby Worth) - 2:54
20. "Monique" (Cahn, Elmer Bernstein) - 3:18
21. "Mr. Success" (Sanicola, Sinatra, Edwin Grienes) - 2:42
22. "Sleep Warm" (Spence, Alan Bergman, Marilyn Keith) - 2:43
23. "No One Ever Tells You" (Hub Atwood, Carroll Coates) - 3:28
24. "To Love and Be Loved" (Cahn, Van Heusen) - 2:58

=== Disc four ===
1. "Time After Time" (Capitol single #4155B) (Styne, Cahn) - 3:31
2. "French Foreign Legion" (Capitol single #4155A) (Billboard No. 61) (Aaron Schroeder, Wood) - 2:03
3. "All My Tomorrows" (Capitol single #4214B) (Cahn, Van Heusen) - 3:15
4. "High Hopes" (Capitol single #4214A) (Billboard No. 30) (Cahn, Van Heusen) - 2:37
5. "They Came to Cordura" (Capitol single #4284B) (Cahn, Van Heusen) - 3:02
6. "Talk to Me" (Capitol single #4284A) (Billboard No. 38) (Eddie Snyder, Stanley Kahan, Rudy Vallee) - 2:24
7. "River, Stay 'Way from My Door" (Capitol single #4376A) (Billboard No. 82) (Mort Dixon, Harry M. Woods) - 2:39
8. "It's Over, It's Over, It's Over" (Capitol single #4376B) (Matt Dennis, Stanford) - 2:42
9. "This Was My Love" (Capitol single #4408B) (Jim Harbert) - 3:28
10. "Nice 'n' Easy" (from Nice 'n' Easy) Capitol single #4408A) (Billboard No. 60) (Alan Bergman, Marilyn Keith, Lew Spence) - 2:45
11. "You'll Always Be the One I Love" (Capitol single #4466B) (Ticker Freeman, Sunny Skylar) - 2:59
12. "Old McDonald Had a Farm" (Capitol single #4466A) (Billboard No. 25) (Thomas D'Urfey, Frederick Thomas Nettingham) - 2:43
13. "My Blue Heaven" (Capitol single #4546A) (Billboard No. 33) (Walter Donaldson, George A. Whiting) - 2:03
14. "Sentimental Baby" (Capitol single #4546B) (A. Bergman, M. Bergman, Spence) - 2:38
15. "Sentimental Journey" (Capitol single #4615B) ♣ (Les Brown, Ben Homer, Bud Green) - 3:26
16. "American Beauty Rose" (Capitol single #4615A) ♣ (Hal David, Arthur Altman, Redd Evans) - 2:22
17. "The Moon Was Yellow (And The Night Was Young)" (different from the 1965 version included on Moonlight Sinatra) (Capitol single #4677A) (Billboard No. 99) (Fred E. Ahlert, Edgar Leslie) - 3:02
18. "I've Heard That Song Before" (Capitol single #4677B) ♦ (Cahn, Styne) - 2:33
19. "Five Minutes More" (Capitol single #4729B) ♦ (Cahn, Styne) - 2:36
20. "I'll Remember April" (Capitol single #4729A) ♣ (Don Raye, Gene DePaul, Patricia Johnston) - 2:50
21. "I Love Paris" (Capitol single #4815A) (Porter) - 1:52
22. "Hidden Persuasion" (Capitol single #4815B) (Wainwright Churchill III) - 2:26
23. "Ya Better Stop" (previously unreleased) (Cliff Ferre, Mark McIntyre) - 2:36
24. "The Sea Song" (previously unreleased) (Dorothy Fields, Arthur Schwartz) - 2:55
25. "Look to Your Heart" (Capitol single #EAP 673) (Cahn, Van Heusen) - 3:10
26. "I Believe" (from This Is Sinatra Volume 2) (Capitol single #W 982) (Billboard No. ) (Cahn, Styne) - 2:33
27. "Love Looks So Well on You" (from Sinatra Sings of Love and Things) (Capitol single #W 1729) (Billboard No. 15) (A. Bergman, M. Bergman, Spence) - 2:41

♣ arranged by Heinie Beau ♦ arranged by Billy May
