= Look to Your Heart (Frank Sinatra album) =

Compilation album by Frank Sinatra
- Released: April 1959
- Recorded: May 2, 1953 – August 15, 1955 Hollywood
- Genres: Vocal jazz; traditional pop
- Length: 34:42
- Label: Capitol

Frank Sinatra chronology
Come Dance with Me! (1959)	Look to Your Heart (1959)	No One Cares (1959)

Professional ratings
Review scores
Source	Rating
Allmusic	3.5/5 stars
Uncut	1/5 stars

Look to Your Heart is an album by American singer Frank Sinatra, released in 1959 but recorded between 1953 and 1955.

This is the third Capitol collection of Sinatra singles and B-sides with Nelson Riddle, following 1956's This Is Sinatra! and 1958's This Is Sinatra Volume 2. It includes three songs from the 1955 musical version of Our Town.

There have been two official Capitol/EMI CD releases of the album: In 1995 within the 3-LPs-on-2-CDs UK package, This is Frank Sinatra, 1953–1957, and within The Capitol Years 21 disc box set. There is also an unofficial compact disc release of this album on the Hallmark label, released in 2010. With the exception of "Our Town" (which was originally released on a 1956 EP), all of the tracks also appear on the box set The Complete Capitol Singles Collection.

== Track listing ==
1. "Look to Your Heart" (Sammy Cahn, Jimmy Van Heusen) – 3:10
2. "Anytime, Anywhere" (Imogen Carpenter, Lenny Adelson) – 2:45
3. "Not as a Stranger" (Van Heusen, Buddy Kaye) – 2:47
4. "Our Town" (Cahn, Van Heusen) – 3:16
5. "You, My Love" (Van Heusen, Mack Gordon) – 2:56
6. "Same Old Saturday Night" (Frank Reardon, Cahn) – 2:31
7. "Fairy Tale" (Jay Livingston, Dick Stanford) – 2:59
8. "The Impatient Years" (Cahn, Van Heusen) – 3:14
9. "I Could Have Told You" (Carl Sigman, Van Heusen) – 3:18
10. "When I Stop Loving You" (George Cates, Alan Copeland, Mort Greene) – 2:56
11. "If I Had Three Wishes" (Claude Baum, Lew Spence) – 2:56
12. "I'm Gonna Live Till I Die" (Al Hoffman, Walter Kent, Mann Curtis) – 1:54

== Personnel ==
- Frank Sinatra – vocals
- Nelson Riddle – arranger, conductor
