= Sinatra Sings of Love and Things =

Compilation album by Frank Sinatra
- Released: July 2, 1962
- Recorded: August 13, 1957 – March 6, 1962, Hollywood
- Genre: Vocal jazz; traditional pop
- Length: 32:59
- Label: Capitol; W 1729

Frank Sinatra chronology
| Sinatra and Swingin' Brass (1962) | Sinatra Sings of Love and Things (1962) | All Alone (1962) |

Professional ratings
Review scores
| Source | Rating |
|---|---|
| AllMusic | 3/5 stars |
| Uncut | 2/5 stars |

Sinatra Sings... of Love and Things is an album by Frank Sinatra, released in 1962.

This is the fifth compilation of Capitol singles and B-sides. All songs are available in the box set The Complete Capitol Singles Collection, except "I Gotta Right to Sing the Blues", the final song Sinatra recorded for Capitol (which appears as a bonus track on the CD reissue of Come Swing with Me!) and "The Nearness of You", which appears as a bonus track on the CD reissue of Nice 'n' Easy. (It was recorded at those sessions.) The album has also been issued in the U.K. as part of the 21-CD box set The Capitol Years. There is an error on the back cover of the original 1962 LP. The very top line states "Twelve great performances never before available in an album!", when actually the closing tune "Something Wonderful Happens in Summer" appears on the 1958 compilation LP This Is Sinatra Volume 2.

== Track listing ==
1. "The Nearness of You" (Hoagy Carmichael, Ned Washington) – 2:44
2. "Hidden Persuasion" (Wainwright Churchill III) – 2:26
3. "The Moon Was Yellow" (Fred E. Ahlert, Edgar Leslie) – 3:02
4. "I Love Paris" (Cole Porter) – 1:52
5. "Monique" (Sammy Cahn, Elmer Bernstein) – 3:18
6. "Chicago" (Fred Fisher) – 2:12
7. "Love Looks So Well on You" (Lew Spence, Marilyn Keith, Alan Bergman) – 2:41
8. "Sentimental Baby" (Spence, Keith, Bergman) – 2:38
9. "Mr. Success" (Frank Sinatra, Edwin Greines, Hank Sanicola) – 2:42
10. "They Came to Cordura" (Sammy Cahn, Jimmy Van Heusen) – 3:02
11. "I Gotta Right to Sing the Blues" (Harold Arlen, Ted Koehler) – 3:00
12. "Something Wonderful Happens in Summer" (Joe Bushkin, John DeVries) – 3:12

== Personnel ==
- Frank Sinatra – vocals
- Nelson Riddle – arranger/conductor
- Felix Slatkin – arranger/conductor
- Skip Martin – arranger
- Irv Cottler – drums, percussion
