= Frank Sinatra Sings the Select Sammy Cahn =

Compilation album by Frank Sinatra
- Released: August 20, 1996
- Recorded: 1953–1961
- Genres: Traditional pop; vocal jazz
- Length: 52:46
- Label: Capitol

Frank Sinatra chronology
Screen Sinatra (1996)	Frank Sinatra Sings the Select Sammy Cahn (1996)	The Complete Capitol Singles Collection (1996)

Professional ratings
Review scores
Source	Rating
AllMusic	3/5 stars
Dayton Daily News	4/4 stars
The Rolling Stone Jazz & Blues Album Guide	3/5 stars

Frank Sinatra Sings the Select Sammy Cahn is a 1996 compilation album by Frank Sinatra that has him singing songs written by Sammy Cahn.

== Track listing ==
- All songs written by Sammy Cahn.
1. "Come Fly with Me" (Sammy Cahn, Jimmy Van Heusen) - 3:19
2. "Time After Time" (Cahn, Jule Styne) - 3:31
3. "(Love Is) The Tender Trap" (Cahn, Van Heusen) - 3:00
4. "Guess I'll Hang My Tears Out to Dry" (Cahn, Styne) - 4:00
5. "Love and Marriage" (Cahn, Van Heusen) - 2:36
6. "Saturday Night (Is the Loneliest Night of the Week)" (Cahn, Styne) - 1:54
7. "All the Way" (Cahn, Van Heusen) - 2:53
8. "I've Heard That Song Before" (Cahn, Styne) - 2:33
9. "All My Tomorrows" (Cahn, Van Heusen) - 3:15
10. "It's the Same Old Dream" (Cahn, Styne) - 3:06
11. "Come Dance With Me" (Cahn, Van Heusen) - 2:31
12. "Three Coins in the Fountain" (Cahn, Styne) - 3:07
13. "Day by Day" (Cahn, Styne) - 2:39
14. "To Love and Be Loved" (Cahn, Van Heusen) - 2:56
15. "High Hopes" (Cahn, Van Heusen) - 2:42
16. "If It's the Last Thing I'll Do" (Cahn, Styne) - 4:00
17. "Five Minutes More" (Cahn, Styne) - 2:35
18. "The Last Dance" (Cahn, Van Heusen) - 2:09
