= All My Tomorrows =

All My Tomorrows may refer to:

- "All My Tomorrows" (song), a 1959 ballad
- All My Tomorrows, a 2003 album by Crystal Gayle
- All My Tomorrows (Grover Washington Jr. album), 1994
