= This Is Sinatra Volume 2 =

This Is Sinatra Volume Two

Compilation album by Frank Sinatra
- Released: March 31, 1958
- Recorded: May 13, 1954 – December 11, 1957 Hollywood
- Genres: Vocal jazz; traditional pop
- Length: 48:56
- Label: Capitol

Frank Sinatra chronology
Come Fly with Me (1958)	This Is Sinatra Volume Two (1958)	Frank Sinatra Sings for Only the Lonely (1958)

Professional ratings
Review scores
Source	Rating
Allmusic	3/5 stars
Uncut	3/5 stars

This Is Sinatra Volume Two is a compilation album by American singer Frank Sinatra, released in 1958.

== Background ==
Another collection of Sinatra singles and B-sides with backings courtesy of Nelson Riddle, following 1956's This Is Sinatra!. It also included seven new tracks, all recorded in late 1957: "Everybody Loves Somebody," "You'll Always Be the One I Love," "Time After Time," "If You Are But a Dream," "It's the Same Old Dream," "I Believe," and "Put Your Dreams Away." Since Sinatra first recorded these songs in the 1940s, and since most dealt with dreams, they might have been meant for a concept album that never came to completion.

"Wait for Me" is a song from the 1956 film "Johnny Concho," a Western in which Sinatra starred.

This collection is long out of print, and appears on compact disc complete and in its original running order only on the 1994 British release "This is Frank Sinatra, 1953-1957" (on EMI's Music for Pleasure [MFP] subsidiary) and in 1998's The Capitol Years 21 disc box set, also a British release. Most of the tracks appear on the box set The Complete Capitol Singles Collection. Others appear on the three-disc compilation The Capitol Years and on other compilations. It was announced on January 28, 2016, that the album would be re-released on LP by Capitol/Universal on April 8, 2016.

== Track listing ==
1. "Hey! Jealous Lover" (Sammy Cahn, Kay Twomey, Bee Walker) – 2:24
2. "Everybody Loves Somebody" (Irving Taylor, Ken Lane) - 3:46
3. "Something Wonderful Happens in Summer" (Joe Bushkin, John DeVries) - 3:16
4. "Half as Lovely (Twice as True)" (Lew Spence, Sammy Gallop) - 3:09
5. "You're Cheatin' Yourself (If You're Cheatin' on Me)" (Al Hoffman, Dick Manning) – 2:38
6. "You'll Always Be the One I Love" (Ticker Freeman, Sonny Skylar) - 2:59
7. "You Forgot All the Words (While I Still Remember the Tune)" (Bernie Wayne, E.H. Jay) - 3:24
8. "(How Little It Matters) How Little We Know" (Phillip Springer, Carolyn Leigh) - 2:39
9. "Time After Time" (Jule Styne, Cahn) - 3:31
10. "Crazy Love" (Cahn, Phil Tuminello) - 2:54
11. "Wait for Me" (Nelson Riddle, Dok Stanford) - 2:54
12. "If You Are But a Dream" (Moe Jaffe, Jack Fulton, Nat Bonx) - 3:50
13. "So Long, My Love" (Cahn, Lew Spence) - 2:50
14. "It's the Same Old Dream" (Styne, Cahn) - 3:06
15. "I Believe" (Styne, Cahn) - 2:33
16. "Put Your Dreams Away (For Another Day)" (Paul Mann, Stephen Weiss, Ruth Lowe) - 3:12
