= All the Way (Frank Sinatra album) =

Compilation album by Frank Sinatra
- Released: April 16, 1961
- Recorded: May 20, 1957–September 1, 1960
- Studio: Capitol Studio A (Hollywood)
- Genres: Vocal jazz; traditional pop
- Length: 35:02
- Label: Capitol
- Producer: Dave Cavanaugh

Frank Sinatra chronology
| Nice 'n' Easy (1960) | All the Way (1961) | Sinatra's Swingin' Session!!! (1961) |

Professional ratings
Review scores
| Source | Rating |
|---|---|
| Allmusic | 3/5 stars |
| Uncut | 2/5 stars |

All the Way is an album by American singer Frank Sinatra, released in 1961 by Capitol Records.

The fourth Capitol compilation album of singles and B-sides from 1957 to 1960, The compilation came out as a sort of response to Frank Sinatra's departure from the label in 1960; All The Way even competed on the charts with Sinatra's debut on his own label, "Ring-A-Ding Ding".

The release was a chart success, reaching number 4 on the Billboard Top Monaural LPs chart (now the Billboard 200). Capitol also released a stereo version, one of the first releases to include songs in simulated stereo, although in this case it predates the duophonic format that Capitol would later implement. Early pressings included a label explaining that it was simulated stereo.

Capitol released All the Way on compact disc briefly in 1988, before discontinuing it in the early 1990s. All tracks are available on The Complete Capitol Singles Collection box set.

== Track listing ==
1. "All the Way" (Sammy Cahn, Jimmy Van Heusen) – 2:55
2. "High Hopes" (Cahn, Van Heusen) – 2:43
3. "Talk to Me" (Eddie Snyder, Stanley Kahan, Rudy Vallee) – 3:04
4. "French Foreign Legion" (Aaron Schroeder, Guy Wood) – 2:03
5. "To Love and Be Loved" (Cahn, Van Heusen) – 3:53
6. "River, Stay 'Way from My Door" (Harry M. Woods, Mort Dixon) – 2:39
7. "Witchcraft" (Cy Coleman, Carolyn Leigh) – 2:54
8. "It's Over, It's Over, It's Over" (Matt Dennis, Dick Stanford) – 2:42
9. "Old MacDonald Had a Farm" (Traditional, Alan Bergman, Marilyn Keith, Lew Spence) – 2:42
10. "This Was My Love" (Jim Harbert) – 3:28
11. "All My Tomorrows" (Cahn, Van Heusen) – 3:15
12. "Sleep Warm" (Bergman, Keith, Spence) – 2:43

== Personnel ==
- Frank Sinatra - vocals
- Nelson Riddle - arranger, conductor
