= No One Cares =

Studio album by Frank Sinatra
- Released: July 20, 1959
- Recorded: March 24-26 and May 14, 1959
- Studio: Capitol Studio A (Hollywood)
- Genres: Vocal jazz; traditional pop
- Length: 37:35
- Label: Capitol
- Producer: Dave Cavanaugh

Frank Sinatra chronology
Look to Your Heart (1959)	No One Cares (1959)	Nice 'n' Easy (1960)

Professional ratings
Review scores
Source	Rating
Allmusic	4.5/5 stars
Uncut	2/5 stars
DownBeat	4/5 stars

No One Cares is the seventeenth studio album by Frank Sinatra, released on July 20, 1959. It is generally considered a sequel to Sinatra's 1957 album Where Are You? (also arranged by Gordon Jenkins), and shares a similar sad and lonesome, gloomy theme and concept as In the Wee Small Hours and Only the Lonely (both arranged by Nelson Riddle).

No One Cares was described by critics as the singer's saddest and darkest album – Sinatra himself purportedly referred to it as a collection of "suicide songs".

== Background ==
At a press interview given around the time of the album's release, Sinatra summed up the mood of the album as:

“We left out 'Gloomy Sunday’ [a song that reportedly has supplied the impetus for a dozen or so suicides] because it was too swingin'. Seriously though, it was a tough album to make and a tough mood to sustain. But Gordon Jenkins and I were thinking alike and everything came out perfectly. I liked doing this album because I think it will mean something to a lot of people - people who know how it is when no one cares."

=== Versions ===
No One Cares was originally released on July 20, 1959, in both stereo and monaural Hi-Fi versions, each containing eleven songs.

A twelfth song, "The One I Love (Belongs to Somebody Else)", was recorded at the sessions, but left unreleased until 1973. In 1990, that song was released in the 3-disc set "The Capitol Years", but whereas the 1973 release included two carefully placed edits to correct a gaffe in the lyrics and a poorly played string passage, the 1990 track was presented raw, without these corrections.

The 1991 CD reissue of the album contains a new mix from the 3-track tapes. All other issues, including the release in the 1998 UK boxed set, use the original 1959 stereo mix.

Tracks 1 and 10, though arranged by Gordon Jenkins as part of the original concept, were conducted by Nelson Riddle (uncredited) in Jenkins' absence. On CD, the final three bonus tracks were not part of the original album, and are arranged and conducted by Nelson Riddle. One of these, "This Was My Love", was recorded at the same session as "When No One Cares" and "I'll Never Smile Again".

=== Artwork ===
The photograph used for the cover artwork was taken at Sinatra's Puccini restaurant in Beverly Hills, California (which he co-owned with Peter Lawford). The liner notes were written by Jazz magazine critic Ralph Gleason. In promotion of the album, Capitol Records had 2,000 giant blowups of the cover printed for display at point-of-purchase locations.

== Track listing ==
Credits are adapted from the album's liner notes.

No One Cares track listing
No.	Title	Music	Length
1.	"When No One Cares"	Cahn; Van Heusen	2:42
2.	"A Cottage for Sale"	Conley; Robinson	3:16
3.	"Stormy Weather"	Arlen; Koehler	3:20
4.	"Where Do You Go?"	Sundgaard; Wilder	2:34
5.	"I Don't Stand a Ghost of a Chance with You"	Crosby; Washington; Young	3:16
6.	"Here's That Rainy Day"	Burke; Van Heusen	3:34
7.	"I Can't Get Started"	Duke; Gershwin	4:01
8.	"Why Try to Change Me Now?"	Coleman; McCarthy	3:41
9.	"Just Friends"	Klenner; Lewis	3:40
10.	"I'll Never Smile Again"	Lowe	3:46
11.	"None But the Lonely Heart"	Tchaikovsky; Westbrook	3:41
Total length:			37:35

No One Cares – 1991 bonus tracks
No.	Title	Music	Length
12.	"The One I Love (Belongs to Somebody Else)"	Jones; Kahn	3:05
13.	"This Was My Love"	Jim Harbert	3:27
14.	"I Could Have Told You"	Van Heusen; Sigman	3:18
15.	"You Forgot All the Words (While I Still Remember the Tune)"	Wayne; Jay	3:20
Total length:			50:46

== Personnel ==
- Frank Sinatra - vocals
- Gordon Jenkins - arranger, conductor
