= Sinatra and Swingin' Brass =

Studio album by Frank Sinatra
- Released: 1962
- Recorded: April 10–11, 1962
- Studio: United, Los Angeles, California; Goldwyn, Los Angeles, California
- Genre: Vocal jazz; traditional pop
- Length: 30:06
- Label: Reprise; R 1005 (mono), R9 1005 (stereo)

Frank Sinatra chronology
Point of No Return (1962)	Sinatra and Swingin' Brass (1962)	Sinatra Sings of Love and Things (1962)

Professional ratings
Review scores
Source	Rating
AllMusic	2.5/5 stars
Encyclopedia of Popular Music	5/5 stars
DownBeat	2/5 stars

Sinatra And Swingin' Brass is the twenty-sixth studio album by American singer Frank Sinatra. Released in 1962, it is Sinatra's fifth album released by Reprise Records.

This is the first time Sinatra worked with arranger/composer Neal Hefti on an album project, following a single-only session that took place in April 1962. For Sinatra and Swingin' Brass, the singer re-recorded a number of songs he had previously recorded for Capitol. "They Can't Take That Away from Me" and "I Get a Kick Out of You" had been recorded eight years earlier for Songs for Young Lovers, "You Brought a New Kind of Love to Me" had been recorded six years prior for Songs for Swingin' Lovers, and "At Long Last Love" had been recorded five years earlier for A Swingin' Affair!

== Track listing ==
No.	Title	Writer(s)	Length
1.	"Goody Goody"	Johnny Mercer; Matty Malneck	1:47
2.	"They Can't Take That Away from Me"	George Gershwin; Ira Gershwin	2:41
3.	"At Long Last Love"	Cole Porter	2:14
4.	"I'm Beginning to See the Light"	Johnny Hodges; Harry James; Duke Ellington; Don George	2:34
5.	"Don'cha Go 'Way Mad"	Jimmy Mundy; Al Stillman; Illinois Jacquet	3:12
6.	"I Get a Kick Out of You"	Porter	3:14
7.	"Tangerine"	Victor Schertzinger; Johnny Mercer	2:03
8.	"Love Is Just Around the Corner"	Lewis E. Gensler; Leo Robin	2:27
9.	"Ain't She Sweet"	Milton Ager; Jack Yellen	2:07
10.	"Serenade In Blue"	Harry Warren; Mack Gordon	2:58
11.	"I Love You"	Porter	2:16
12.	"Pick Yourself Up"	Jerome Kern; Dorothy Fields	2:33
13.	"Everybody's Twistin'"	Rube Bloom; Ted Koehler	2:31
14.	"Nothing But the Best"	Johnny Rotella	3:00
15.	"You Brought a New Kind of Love to Me"	Sammy Fain; Irving Kahal; Pierre Norman Connor	2:38
Total length:			38:15

The last song was a bonus track added to the 1992 CD release and not part of the original album. For the 1998 Entertainer of the Century remastered series, the track listing reverted to the original 1962 release.

== Personnel ==
- Frank Sinatra – vocals
- Neal Hefti – arranger, conductor

== Charts ==
Chart (1962)	Peak position
UK Albums Chart	14
Italian Albums (HitParadeItalia)	1
