= Lucky number (disambiguation) =

A lucky number, in number theory, is a natural number generated by a particular sieve algorithm.

Lucky number may also refer to:

== Film and television ==
- The Lucky Number, a 1933 British comedy film
- Lucky Number (film), a 1951 Donald Duck cartoon
- Lucky Numbers, a 2000 American comedy film
- #Lucky Number, a 2015 film starring Tom Pelphrey
- Lucky Numbers (TV series), a 1995–1997 British game show

== Music ==
- Lucky Number (album) or the title song, by Jolin Tsai, 2001
- Lucky Numbers (album), by Frank Sinatra, 1998
- Lucky Number: The Best of Lene Lovich, an album by Lene Lovich, 2004
- "Lucky Number" (song), by Lene Lovich, 1979
- "Lucky Number", a song by Saves the Day from Saves the Day, 2013

== Other uses ==
- Lucky numbers of Euler, producing prime-generating polynomials
- A number believed to affect one's luck
- Lucky number combinations, an element of Chinese numerology
- Lucky Numbers, a discontinued Cadbury product
