= This Is Sinatra! =

Compilation album by Frank Sinatra
- Released: November 10, 1956
- Recorded: April 30, 1953 – September 13, 1955
- Studios: Capitol, 5515 Melrose Ave. (Hollywood)
- Genres: Vocal jazz; traditional pop
- Length: 35:52
- Label: Capitol

Frank Sinatra chronology
Songs for Swingin' Lovers! (1956)	This Is Sinatra! (1956)	Close to You (1957)

Professional ratings
Review scores
Source	Rating
Allmusic	4/5 stars
Uncut	4/5 stars

This Is Sinatra! is a compilation album by Frank Sinatra, released in 1956.

This is the first collection of Sinatra's singles and B-sides with Nelson Riddle. This album is now available on CD (Bluemoon CD 803) All of the tracks also appear on the box set The Complete Capitol Singles Collection and various Capitol reissues. A second collection, entitled This Is Sinatra Volume 2, was released in 1958.

Both albums were part of Capitol's This Is series. The albums highlighted past hits by artists like Sinatra, June Christy, Dean Martin and Nat "King" Cole as well as newly released (and hopefully hit-making) singles.

== Track listing ==
1. "I've Got the World on a String" (Harold Arlen, Ted Koehler) - 2:14
2. "Three Coins in the Fountain" (Jule Styne, Sammy Cahn) - 3:07
3. "Love and Marriage" (Jimmy Van Heusen, Cahn) - 2:41
4. "From Here to Eternity" (Freddy Karger, Robert Wells) - 3:01
5. "South of the Border" (Jimmy Kennedy, Michael Carr) - 2:52
6. "Rain (Falling from the Skies)" (Robert Mellin, Gerald Finlay) - 3:27
7. "The Gal That Got Away" (Arlen, Ira Gershwin) - 3:12
8. "Young at Heart" (Johnny Richards, Carolyn Leigh) - 2:53
9. "Learnin' the Blues" (Dolores Silvers) - 3:04
10. "My One and Only Love" (Guy Wood, Mellin) - 3:14
11. "(Love Is) The Tender Trap" (Van Heusen, Cahn) - 3:00
12. "Don't Worry 'Bout Me" (Rube Bloom, Koehler) - 3:07

== Personnel ==
- Frank Sinatra - Vocals
- Nelson Riddle - Arranger, Conductor

== Charts ==
Chart (1957)	Peak position
UK Albums Chart	1
