= Frank Sinatra Sings for Only the Lonely =

Studio album by Frank Sinatra
- Released: September 8, 1958
- Recorded: May 29, June 24 & 26, 1958
- Studio: Capitol Studio A (Hollywood)
- Genres: Vocal jazz; traditional pop
- Length: 54:28 (mono LP); 45:23 (stereo LP)
- Label: Capitol
- Producer: Dave Cavanaugh

Frank Sinatra chronology
| This Is Sinatra Volume 2 (1958) | Frank Sinatra Sings for Only the Lonely (1958) | Come Dance with Me! (1959) |

Frank Sinatra Sings for Only the Lonely (also known as Sings for Only the Lonely or simply Only the Lonely) is the fifteenth studio album by American singer Frank Sinatra. It was released on September 8, 1958, through Capitol Records.

The album consists of a collection of torch songs, following a formula similar to Sinatra's previous albums In the Wee Small Hours (1955) and Where Are You? (1957).

According to John Rockwell's book, Sinatra: An American Classic, when asked at a party in the mid-1970s if he had a favorite album among his recordings, without hesitation, Sinatra chose Only the Lonely.

The album's front cover was painted by Nicholas Volpe, who won a Grammy Award for the painting. The painting features Sinatra as a sullen, Pagliacci-like clown. Sketched on the album's back cover is one of Sinatra's recurrent visual motifs: a lamppost.

== Background ==
Sinatra had planned to record the album with arranger Gordon Jenkins, with whom he had worked on Where Are You?. Since Jenkins was unavailable at the time, Sinatra chose to work with his frequent collaborator, Nelson Riddle. The three tracks conducted by Riddle at the would-be first session (May 5, 1958) were not used, and the subsequent May 29 session was conducted by Felix Slatkin, uncredited, after Riddle went on a pre-arranged tour with Nat King Cole.

At the time of the recording, Sinatra's divorce from Ava Gardner had been finalized, and Nelson Riddle (who wrote the album's arrangements) had recently suffered the deaths of his mother and daughter. Of these events, Riddle remarked: "If I can attach events like that to music ... perhaps Only the Lonely was the result."

== Mono and stereo version differences ==
Frank Sinatra Sings for Only the Lonely was recorded during the time when mass-produced stereo musical recordings were just entering the marketplace. The album was Sinatra's third full-length album to be recorded in both mono and stereo versions, after Where Are You? and Come Fly with Me. According to audio engineer Steve Hoffman, who produced a number of reissues of Capitol Records albums originally recorded in the 1950s, Capitol was during this time continuing to record sessions in mono using their by-then standard microphone placement techniques (including the use of eight separate microphones on the orchestra), and making separate recordings of the session on a 3-track tape recorder using two or three microphones. This method of recording soon gave way to a method where the same set of microphones was used to record sessions to a single multi-track tape, which then served as the source for both mono and stereo mixes (for albums that were issued in both formats).

Capitol's 3-track session tapes (which used fewer microphones) were used as the source for the original stereo album release and for subsequent stereo reissues. Differences in the number of microphones and their proximity to the orchestra's instruments contributed to some of the differences in the sound of the mono and stereo versions. "[F]or me, the mono version kills the stereo mix", Hoffman wrote of the two versions of the album. Frank Sinatra Sings for Only the Lonely was the final Sinatra Capitol album to be recorded using separate equipment for the mono and stereo versions.

The original mono album had 12 tracks, while the original stereo version had only 10 tracks. The original stereo version did not include "It's a Lonesome Old Town" and "Spring Is Here", though subsequent stereo reissues of the album used all 12 original tracks.

== Reception ==
Professional ratings
Review scores
| Source | Rating |
|---|---|
| AllMusic | 5/5 stars |
| The Encyclopedia of Popular Music | 5/5 stars |

In 2000, it was voted number 125 in Colin Larkin's All Time Top 1000 Albums. Q placed Only the Lonely at No. 1 on the "15 Greatest Stoner Albums of All Time". The album peaked at No. 1 on Billboard's pop album chart during a 120-week chart-run, and was certified Gold on June 21, 1962, nearly four years after its release. As noted by biographer Peter J. Levinson, "Nelson chose several instrumental soloists to communicate the essence of the music on the album. Harry Edison showed the somber side of his playing on 'Willow Weep for Me.' The late, great trombonist Ray Sims, the unsung soloist with Les Brown and Harry James and brother of jazz tenor saxophonist stalwart 'Zoot' Sims, delivered the finest recording work of his long career with a brace of meaningful solos. Bill Miller contributed several beautifully conceived piano solos."

== Grammy Awards ==
Sinatra was nominated for five Grammy Awards at the inaugural Grammy Awards in 1959. Frank Sinatra Sings for Only the Lonely and Sinatra's other album released in 1958, Come Fly with Me, were nominated for the Album of the Year, and Frank Sinatra Sings for Only the Lonely won the Grammy Award for Best Album Cover.

== Track listing ==
| No. | Title | Writer(s) | Length |
|---|---|---|---|
| 1. | "Only the Lonely" | Sammy Cahn; Jimmy Van Heusen | 4:10 |
| 2. | "Angel Eyes" | Matt Dennis; Earl Brent | 3:46 |
| 3. | "What's New?" | Bob Haggart; Johnny Burke | 5:13 |
| 4. | "It's a Lonesome Old Town" | Harry Tobias; Charles Kisco | 4:18 |
| 5. | "Willow Weep for Me" | Ann Ronell | 4:49 |
| 6. | "Goodbye" | Gordon Jenkins | 5:45 |
| 7. | "Blues in the Night" | Harold Arlen; Johnny Mercer | 4:44 |
| 8. | "Guess I'll Hang My Tears Out to Dry" | Cahn; Jule Styne | 4:00 |
| 9. | "Ebb Tide" | Robert Maxwell; Carl Sigman | 3:18 |
| 10. | "Spring Is Here" | Richard Rodgers; Lorenz Hart | 4:47 |
| 11. | "Gone with the Wind" | Allie Wrubel; Herb Magidson | 5:15 |
| 12. | "One for My Baby (and One More for the Road)" | Arlen; Mercer | 4:23 |
| Total length: | | | 54:28 |

1987 CD bonus tracks
| No. | Title | Writer(s) | Length |
|---|---|---|---|
| 13. | "Sleep Warm" | Lew Spence; Marilyn Keith; Alan Bergman | 2:45 |
| 14. | "Where or When" | Rodgers; Hart | 2:25 |
| Total length: | | | 59:38 |

== Certifications ==
| Region | Certification | Certified units/sales |
|---|---|---|
| United States (RIAA) | Gold | 500,000^{^} |
^{^} Shipments figures based on certification alone.

== Notes ==
- On May 29, 1958, Sinatra unsuccessfully attempted to record Billy Strayhorn's ballad "Lush Life". A bootleg recording of Sinatra's attempt at "Lush Life" exists; this was the only time Sinatra sang the song in his career. The session material of "Lush Life" was included as part of the 60th anniversary deluxe edition of Only the Lonely, released in October 2018, and in the 1958 Mono Mix / Expanded Edition of Only the Lonely, also released in October 2018.

== Bibliography ==
- Ingham, Chris (June 30, 2005). The Rough Guide to Frank Sinatra. Rough Guides Ltd. ISBN 1-84353-414-2.
- Summers, Anthony; Swan, Robbyn (2005). Sinatra: The Life. Doubleday. ISBN 0-552-15331-1.
