= Mr. Success =

- 1958 Capitol Records 45 single release, F4070

Single by Frank Sinatra
- B-side: "Sleep Warm"
- Released: October 1958
- Genre: Popular
- Label: Capitol
- Composer: Edwin Greines Cohen
- Lyricists: Frank Sinatra, Hank Sanicola

Frank Sinatra singles chronology
"Monique" (1958)	"Mr. Success" (1958)	"To Love and Be Loved" (1958)

1958 sheet music cover, Barton Music, New York.

"Mr. Success" is a 1958 popular song recorded and co-written by Frank Sinatra. The song was released as a Capitol Records A-side single.

== Background ==
Frank Sinatra co-wrote the song in 1958 with Hank Sanicola and Edwin Greines. Sinatra recorded the song with the Nelson Riddle Orchestra. It was released in October as a Capitol Records 45 single, F4070, in the US, backed with "Sleep Warm". The single was also released in the UK and Canada where it charted in the Top 40. In the US, the single reached #41 on the Billboard pop singles chart in a chart run of 11 weeks. In the UK, released as Capitol 45 CL 14956, the single reached #25 in a 4-week chart run. In Canada, the single reached #19 in a 12-week chart run.

The song was published by the Barton Music Corporation in New York. The music was composed by Edwin Greines. The lyrics were written by Hank Sanicola and Frank Sinatra.

== Album appearances ==
The song appeared on the 1962 Frank Sinatra Capitol Records album Sinatra Sings of Love and Things, the 1996 Frank Sinatra album The Complete Capitol Singles Collection, and the 1998 Frank Sinatra 21-CD collection The Capitol Years distributed by EMI. The song also appeared on the 2001 Capitol compilation album Eee-O-11: The Best of the Rat Pack, Capitol #CDP-7243-5-36452-2-9, which features songs by Frank Sinatra, Dean Martin, and Sammy Davis Jr.

== Personnel ==
The song was recorded on Thursday, September 11, 1958, at the Capitol Tower in Hollywood in a recording session from 9:45 P.M. to 12:45 A.M.. Three songs were recorded, arranged and conducted by Nelson Riddle: "Mr. Success", "Sleep Warm" and "Where or When", take 7.

The personnel on the session were: Pete Candoli, Conrad Gozzo, Mickey Mangano, Cappy Lewis (trumpet); Tommy Pederson, Dick Noel (trombone); Juan Tizol (valve trombone); George Roberts (bass trombone); Willie Schwartz, Bill Green, Champ Webb, Joe Koch, Harry Klee (sax/woodwinds); Harold Dicterow, Ben Gill, Murray Kellner, David Frisina, Lisa Minghetti, Alex Beller, Victor Bay, Felix Slatkin, Eudice Shapiro, Marshall Sosson (violin); David Sterkin, Stanley Harris (viola); Eleanor Slatkin, Victor Gottlieb, Elizabeth Greenschpoon (cello); Kathryn Julye (harp); Bill Miller (piano); Al Viola (guitar); Joe Comfort (bass); and Alvin Stoller (drums).

== Sources ==
- Granata, Charles L. (1999). Sessions with Sinatra: Frank Sinatra and the Art of Recording. Chicago Review Press. ISBN 1-55652-509-5
- Phasey, Chris (1995). Francis Albert Sinatra: Tracked Down (Discography). Buckland Publications. ISBN 0-7212-0935-1
- Summers, Antony and Swan, Robbyn (2005). Sinatra: The Life. Doubleday. ISBN 0-552-15331-1
