= Grammy Award for Best Arrangement =

Former entertainment award category

The Grammy Award for Best Arrangement was awarded from 1959 to 1962.

Since 1963 the award has been divided into two awards for Best Arrangement, Instrumental and Vocals & Best Arrangement, Instrumental or A Cappella. In 1976 a vocal arrangement award was also added, now called the Grammy Award for Best Vocal Arrangement for Two or More Voices

Years reflect the year in which the Grammy Awards were presented, for works released in the previous year.

Year	Work	Nominees
1962	Henry Mancini (Arranger & Performer) for Moon River	Gerry Mulligan for All About Rosie; Peter Nero for New Piano in Town; Dizzy Gillespie for Perceptions; Si Zentner for Up A Lazy River (album)
1961	Henry Mancini (Arranger & Performer) for Mr. Lucky	Billy May and George Shearing for "Honeysuckle Rose"; Bill Holman for "I'm Gonna Go Fishin'"; Quincy Jones for "Let the Good Times Roll" (Ray Charles vocal); Nelson Riddle for "Nice 'n' Easy" (single) (Frank Sinatra vocal); Percy Faith for "Theme from A Summer Place"; Don Costa for "Theme from The Apartment"; Dick Schory for Wild Percussion and Horns A'Plenty
1960	Billy May (Arranger) for Come Dance With Me! performed by Frank Sinatra	Juan García Esquivel (Arranger & Performer) for Strings Aflame; Henry Mancini (Arranger & Performer) for More Music from Peter Gunn; Johnny Green (Arranger) for An Evening with Alan Jay Lerner and Frederick Loewe; Bobby Darin (Arranger & Performer) for "Mack the Knife"
1959	Henry Mancini (Arranger & Performer) for The Music from Peter Gunn	Billy May (Arranger & Performer) for Billy May’s Big Fat Brass; Billy May (Arranger) for Come Fly with Me; Jack Marshall (Arranger) for Fever; Nelson Riddle (Arranger & Performer) for Witchcraft!
