= Sinatra's Swingin' Session!!! =

Sinatra's Swingin' Session

Studio album by Frank Sinatra
- Released: January 3, 1961
- Recorded: August 22–23, 31 & September 1, 1960
- Studio: Capitol Studio A (Hollywood)
- Genre: Traditional pop
- Length: 26:23 (original 12-song release)
- Label: Capitol
- Producer: Dave Cavanaugh

Frank Sinatra chronology
All The Way (1961)	Sinatra's Swingin' Session (1961)	Ring-a-Ding-Ding! (1961)

Professional ratings
Review scores
Source	Rating
Allmusic	4.5/5 stars
Encyclopedia of Popular Music	4/5 stars
Uncut	1/5 stars

Sinatra's Swingin' Session!!! is the nineteenth studio album by Frank Sinatra, released on January 3, 1961.

Six of the tracks on the album are re-recordings of a batch of songs that Sinatra had previously recorded on the Columbia album, Sing and Dance with Frank Sinatra.

It was released on compact disc as Sinatra's Swingin' Session!!! And More.

== Track listing ==
No.	Title	Writer(s)	Length
1.	"When You're Smiling"	Mark Fisher, Joe Goodwin, Larry Shay	2:00
2.	"Blue Moon"	Richard Rodgers, Lorenz Hart	2:51
3.	"S'Posin'"	Paul Denniker, Andy Razaf	1:48
4.	"It All Depends on You"	B.G. DeSylva, Lew Brown, Ray Henderson	2:02
5.	"It's Only a Paper Moon"	Harold Arlen, Yip Harburg, Billy Rose	2:19
6.	"My Blue Heaven"	Walter Donaldson, George A. Whiting	2:03
7.	"Should I?"	Arthur Freed, Nacio Herb Brown	1:30
8.	"September in the Rain"	Harry Warren, Al Dubin	2:58
9.	"Always"	Irving Berlin	2:17
10.	"I Can't Believe That You're In Love With Me"	Clarence Gaskill, Jimmy McHugh	2:25
11.	"I Concentrate on You"	Cole Porter	2:23
12.	"You Do Something to Me"	Porter	1:33

CD reissue bonus tracks (not included on the original 1961 release)
No.	Title	Writer(s)	Length
13.	"Sentimental Baby"	Alan Bergman, Marilyn Keith, Lew Spence	2:36
14.	"Hidden Persuasion"	Wainwright Churchill III	2:25
15.	"Ol' McDonald"	Traditional, Bergman, Keith, Spence	2:41

== Personnel ==
- Frank Sinatra – vocals
- Nelson Riddle – arranger, conductor
- Buddy Collette – tenor sax, flutes
