= Witchcraft (1957 song) =

Song by Cy Coleman and Carolyn Leigh

Single by Frank Sinatra
- B-side: "Tell Her You Love Her"
- Released: December 23, 1957
- Recorded: May 20, 1957
- Studio: Capitol Studios, Hollywood, Los Angeles, California
- Genre: Swing, traditional pop
- Length: 2:54
- Label: Capitol
- Songwriters: Cy Coleman, Carolyn Leigh
- Producer: Dave Cavanaugh

Frank Sinatra singles chronology
"All the Way" (1957)	"Witchcraft" (1957)	"Mistletoe and Holly" (1957)

"Witchcraft" is a popular song, composed by Cy Coleman with lyrics by Carolyn Leigh. It was first recorded in 1957.

== Versions ==
Frank Sinatra recorded "Witchcraft" three times in a studio setting. The first recording was in 1957, for his single release, and was later released on his compilation album All the Way (1961). Sinatra re-recorded "Witchcraft" for 1963's Sinatra's Sinatra, and finally recorded it as a duet with Anita Baker for Duets (1993).

Recording Date	Company	Format	Album	Track:Album	Album Date	Collaborators	Arranged by
May 20, 1957	Capitol	Studio	The Complete Capitol Singles Collection	3/13:3/5	September 3, 1996		Nelson Riddle
April 30, 1963	Reprise	Studio	Sinatra's Sinatra	5/12:1/1	1963		Nelson Riddle
July 9, 1993	Capitol	Electronic duet	Duets	11/13:1/1	July 9, 1993	Anita Baker	Nelson Riddle

== Chart performance ==
"Witchcraft" was released in the U.S. in 1957 as a single by Frank Sinatra. At its highest ranking it reached number six on the Hot 100 chart and stayed on the charts for sixteen weeks.

== Other recordings ==
"Witchcraft" has been recorded by many other artists, including Chris Connor, as the title track of her 1959 album; Sarah Vaughan, on her 1962 album You're Mine You; Ella Fitzgerald, on Ella Returns to Berlin (1961); and Bill Evans on Portrait in Jazz (1959). Bing Crosby recorded the song in 1958 for use on his radio show and it was subsequently included on the CD Bing Sings the Sinatra Songbook (2011). In 1961, it was included on the album The Soulful Moods of Marvin Gaye. In 1992, a version by Robert Palmer peaked at the top 50 on the UK Singles Chart. A version by Joe Malone was featured in the 1993 movie Hocus Pocus. Siouxsie Sioux performed it in concert with her second band The Creatures and a brass section in 1998: it was then included on their live CD, Zulu. Robert Smith of the Cure recorded a version of the song for Tim Burton's Frankenweenie Unleashed!, a 14-track collection of songs "inspired by" the filmmaker's stop-motion creation Frankenweenie, released on 25 September 2012. Anthony Strong released a version of the song on his 2013 album Stepping Out.

== Awards ==
=== Grammys ===
At the 1st Grammy Awards, Frank Sinatra was nominated for six Grammy awards, with Sinatra's recording of "Witchcraft" being nominated for the Record of the Year, Song of the Year, Best Male Pop Vocal Performance, and Nelson Riddle's arrangement nominated for the Grammy Award for Best Arrangement. Sinatra had two albums nominated for the Grammy Award for Album of the Year, and won the Grammy Award for Best Album Cover for Only the Lonely.

Peggy Lee performed "Witchcraft" in her 1981 BBC television special Peggy Lee Entertains.

== Popular culture ==
- In the 1960 television special The Frank Sinatra Timex Show: Welcome Home Elvis, Elvis Presley performed "Witchcraft" as part of a duet with Frank Sinatra, who sang "Love Me Tender".
- A portion of the Frank Sinatra rendition is played during the climax of the film Who Framed Roger Rabbit.
- The Frank Sinatra rendition is included in the soundtrack for the film Fifty Shades of Grey.
- In the season-one episode "Sweet Charity" of Sabrina the Teenage Witch, Salem Saberhagen, voiced by Nick Bakay, sings part of "Witchcraft".
