= Maybe You'll Be There =

"Maybe You'll Be There" is a popular song composed by Rube Bloom, with lyrics written by Sammy Gallop. The song was published in 1947.

The recording by Gordon Jenkins was released by Decca Records as catalog number 24403. It first reached the Billboard magazine Best Seller chart on June 11, 1948, and lasted 30 weeks on the chart, peaking at No. 3. This recording was Jenkins' first charting record. The vocal on that recording featured the piano player Charles LaVere. In the UK, a contemporary cover version by Steve Conway was released on Columbia.

It has become a pop standard, recorded by many artists since its composition, with a well-known recording being by The Four Aces.

== Notable later recordings ==
- Billie Holiday - (1948)
- Kay Starr - In a Blue Mood (1954)
- June Christy - The Misty Miss Christy (1956)
- Frank Sinatra - Where Are You? (1957)
- Diana Krall - Live in Paris (2002)
- Lee Andrews & the Hearts - Teardrops: The Very Best of Lee Andrews & the Hearts (2002)
- Bob Dylan - Fallen Angels (2016)
