= Come Fly with Me (Frank Sinatra album) =

Studio album by Frank Sinatra
- Released: January 6, 1958
- Recorded: October 1, 3, 8, 1957
- Studio: Capitol Studio A (Hollywood)
- Genres: Vocal jazz, traditional pop
- Length: 38:47; 45:40 (CD reissue)
- Label: Capitol
- Producer: Voyle Gilmore

Frank Sinatra chronology
A Jolly Christmas from Frank Sinatra (1957)	Come Fly with Me (1958)	This Is Sinatra Volume 2 (1958)

Professional ratings
Review scores
Source	Rating
AllMusic	5/5 stars
The Encyclopedia of Popular Music	5/5 stars
Uncut	3/5 stars

Come Fly with Me is the fourteenth studio album by American singer Frank Sinatra, released in 1958.

In 2000 it was voted number 616 in Colin Larkin's All Time Top 1000 Albums.

== Background ==
Sinatra's first collaboration with arranger/conductor Billy May, Come Fly with Me was designed as a musical trip around the world. Sammy Cahn and Jimmy Van Heusen wrote the title track at Sinatra's request.

May would arrange two other Capitol albums for Sinatra, Come Dance with Me! (1958) and Come Swing with Me! (1961).

In his autobiography All You Need Is Ears, producer George Martin wrote of having visited the Capitol Tower during the recording sessions for the album. According to Martin's book, Sinatra expressed intense dislike for the album cover upon being first shown a mock-up by producer Voyle Gilmore, suggesting it looked like an advertisement for TWA. Martin said that Sinatra suspected that a studio executive had accepted money for this product placement.

The album reached No. 1 on the Billboard album chart in its second week, and remained at the top for five weeks. At the inaugural Grammy Awards Come Fly with Me was nominated for the Grammy Award for Album of the Year, and it was inducted into the Grammy Hall of Fame in 2004.

Though recorded simultaneously in true stereo alongside a distinct mono mix, "Come Fly with Me" was released to record stores in 1958 in monaural only, a standard practice by Capitol records at the time. The label released the stereo version in 1961.

In 2025, it was revealed that a rendition of "Flying Down to Rio" had been cut from the album.

== Track listing ==
Side one
No.	Title	Length
1.	"Come Fly with Me" (Sammy Cahn, Jimmy Van Heusen)	3:19
2.	"Around the World" (Victor Young, Harold Adamson)	3:20
3.	"Isle of Capri" (Will Grosz, Jimmy Kennedy)	2:29
4.	"Moonlight in Vermont" (Karl Suessdorf, John Blackburn)	3:32
5.	"Autumn in New York" (Vernon Duke)	4:37
6.	"On the Road to Mandalay" (Oley Speaks, Rudyard Kipling)	3:28

Side two
No.	Title	Length
1.	"Let's Get Away from It All" (Matt Dennis, Tom Adair)	2:11
2.	"April in Paris" (Duke, Yip Harburg)	2:50
3.	"London by Night" (Carroll Coates)	3:30
4.	"Brazil" (Ary Barroso, Bob Russell)	2:55
5.	"Blue Hawaii" (Leo Robin, Ralph Rainger)	2:44
6.	"It's Nice to Go Trav'ling" (Cahn, Van Heusen)	3:52
Total length:		38:47

CD reissue bonus tracks
No.	Title	Length
1.	"Chicago (That Toddlin' Town)" (Fred Fisher)	2:14
2.	"South of the Border" (Jimmy Kennedy, Michael Carr)	2:50
3.	"I Love Paris" (Cole Porter)	1:49
Total length:		45:40

== "On the Road to Mandalay" ==
Part of sleeve of first UK mono release LCT 6154, showing "On the Road to Mandalay" substituted by "It Happened in Monterey".

Sinatra recorded a jazzy, controversial arrangement of On the Road to Mandalay, in which elements of the Kipling text were changed, notably Temple-bells becoming crazy bells, for the album. Rudyard Kipling's daughter, Elsie Bambridge, so disliked Sinatra's lyrical improvisations and jazzy arrangement of the song that she exercised her authority as executrix of Kipling's estate (because Kipling's poem was still copyrighted in the United Kingdom [copyright in the U. K. extended for 70 years after his death in 1936]) to have the song banned for some years in the U.K.

When the album was released in the United Kingdom, "On the Road to Mandalay" was replaced by "It Happened in Monterey" on original mono releases and "French Foreign Legion" on stereo copies, while the song "Chicago" was used in other parts of the British Commonwealth. Sinatra sang the song in Australia during a concert tour in 1959 and relayed the story of the Kipling family objection to the song and explained how the Australian release of Come Fly with Me came to contain "Chicago". "Mandalay" was eventually restored on the 1984 UK re-pressing, and has been included on all subsequent releases.

Kipling's daughter was not alone in being upset with Sinatra’s version. In a selection of comments on various topics, The New York Times said, "We applaud Mrs. Bambridge on her defense of good taste against the inroads of 'slanguage.' . . . It is a form of sacrilege to alter [great poetry] because it has been entrusted to us as part of our permanent heritage."
