= All My Tomorrows (song) =

Single by Frank Sinatra

from the album All the Way
- A-side: "High Hopes"
- Released: June 5, 1959 (single); 1961 (album version)
- Recorded: December 29, 1958
- Studio: Capitol Studios, Hollywood, California
- Genre: Traditional pop
- Length: 3:13
- Label: Capitol
- Composer: Jimmy Van Heusen
- Lyricist: Sammy Cahn

Frank Sinatra singles chronology
"French Foreign Legion" / "Time After Time" (1959)	"High Hopes" / "All My Tomorrows" (1959)	"Talk to Me" / "They Came to Cordura" (1959)

"All My Tomorrows" is a 1959 ballad with lyrics by Sammy Cahn and music by Jimmy van Heusen. The song was written for Frank Sinatra. It was introduced in the film A Hole in the Head where Sinatra sings it in the opening credits.

Sinatra later featured "All My Tomorrows" on his 1961 album All the Way. Sinatra re-recorded it for his 1969 album My Way, in a new arrangement which writer Charles L. Granata considered superior to the original, and which Stephen Thomas Erlewine of AllMusic called "lush and aching". Rolling Stone described the song as "the poignant monologue of a man determined to turn his life around". This version also contains a melody from Sinatra's 1966 hit "Strangers In The Night."

== Release history ==
Sinatra released the song on the reverse side of a single with "High Hopes" in 1959. The song was named one of Billboard's Spotlight Winners of the Week for May 18, 1959.

== Covers ==
Bob Dylan sang the song in concert at the Pine Knob Music Theatre in Clarkston, Michigan on June 30, 1986. Christine Andreas released a version of the song in 1998 on her album Love Is Good. In 2013 Canadian singer Martha Brooks issued a jazz CD featuring 11 Cahn tunes titled All My Tomorrows: The Music of Sammy Cahn. The song has been covered by numerous other artists, including Tony Bennett, Mavis Rivers, Pia Zadora, Shirley Horn, Crystal Gayle, Glen Campbell, Carol Kidd, and Michael Feinstein. In 1994, Grover Washington Jr. recorded the song for his album All My Tomorrows and named the album after it.
