= Imogen Carpenter =

American actress

- Born: Mary Imogene Carpenter; February 2, 1912; Hot Springs, Arkansas
- Died: March 24, 1993 (aged 81); Los Angeles, California
- Education: Chicago Musical College, Boguslawski School of Music
- Occupations: Actress, musician, composer, music lecturer
- Spouse: Milton Feldman

Imogen Carpenter (1912–1993) was a mid-20th century American actress, musician, composer and music lecturer.

In 1926 at age 14, she moved from her native Arkansas to Chicago to attend the Chicago Musical College and later the Boguslawski School of Music. She worked first as a concert pianist and later as a singer and pianist in night clubs, theaters, and on radio.

She appeared in the Broadway musicals Ziegfeld Follies of 1941 and Cole Porter's Mexican Hayride. Collaborating with songwriters Lenny Adelson, Kim Gannon, and others, she produced several popular song compositions.

== Works ==
- "Anytime, Anywhere" (Imogen Carpenter, Lenny Adelson) on Frank Sinatra's Look to Your Heart album and Seth MacFarlane's Music Is Better Than Words album
- "She Always Knows" (Imogen Carpenter, Lenny Adelson) on Sammy Davis Jr.'s Here's Lookin' at You album
- "Born to Sing the Blues" (Lenny Adelson, Imogen Carpenter) on Shirley Bassey's Born to Sing the Blues album

== Personal ==
Carpenter married movie producer Milton Feldman, who was born July 19, 1911, in New York City and died October 8, 1976, in Woodland Hills, Los Angeles, California; they had two children.

During World War 2, Carpenter dated U.S. Naval Commander Frederick J. Becton, captain of the destroyer USS Laffey (DD-724), which successfully withstood a Japanese kamikaze attack during the Battle of Okinawa.
