= Something's Gotta Give (Johnny Mercer song) =

1954 song by Johnny Mercer

Single by Fred Astaire
- B-side: "Sluefoot"
- Written: 1954
- Published: 1955
- Released: 1955
- Genre: Traditional pop
- Length: 3:01
- Label: RCA Victor
- Songwriter: Johnny Mercer

"Something's Gotta Give" is a popular song with words and music by Johnny Mercer in 1954. It was published in 1955. It was written for and first performed by Fred Astaire in the 1955 musical film Daddy Long Legs, and was nominated the same year for an Academy Award for Best Original Song, losing to "Love is a Many Splendored Thing" from the film of the same name.

== Background ==
The song playfully uses the irresistible force paradox – which asks what happens when an irresistible force meets an immovable object – as a metaphor for a relationship between a vivacious woman and an older, world-weary man. The man, it is implied, will give in to temptation and kiss the woman. The song's lyrics echo the plot of Daddy Long Legs, in which a reserved man in his 50s (Astaire) falls in love with a woman in her early 20s (Leslie Caron).

== Popular cover versions ==
- The biggest-selling version was recorded by The McGuire Sisters, reaching #5 on the Billboard Hot 100 chart in 1955 (see 1955 in music).
- Likewise, in 1955, Sammy Davis Jr. had a popular competing version, which also made the Top 10 on the Billboard pop chart, peaking at #9.
- Mel Tormé released a version on his Sings Fred Astaire album, in 1956.
- Bing Crosby recorded the song in 1955 for use on his radio show and it was subsequently included in the box set The Bing Crosby CBS Radio Recordings (1954-56) issued by Mosaic Records (catalog MD7-245) in 2009.
- Frank Sinatra recorded the song in 1959 on his album Come Dance with Me!
- In 1964, Ella Fitzgerald included this song on her Verve album Ella Fitzgerald Sings the Johnny Mercer Songbook, with arrangements by Nelson Riddle.
- A French version, "Ça Va Éclater", was recorded by early 1950 duo from Reims, Les Soeurs Etienne. Sisters, Louise died in 2016 (aged 92) and Odette in 2012 (aged 85)

== In popular culture ==
- In The Lucy–Desi Comedy Hour episode, "Lucy Goes to Mexico" (S2•E1), Maurice Chevalier rehearses the song in his hotel room while listening to Lucy and Ricky (Lucille Ball and Desi Arnaz, respectively) arguing through the communicating door between his and their rooms, and while also listening to Fred and Ethel (William Frawley and Vivian Vance, respectively) arguing through the communicating door between his and their rooms.
- The Frank Sinatra recording was featured in the incomplete 37-minute, 1962 film Something's Got to Give, which was Marilyn Monroe's last work, the film being abandoned after her death.
- Joanne Woodward sings "Something's Gotta Give" during a balloon striptease in the film The Stripper (minute 1:22:20).
- In the game Fallout: New Vegas, Dean Domino from the Dead Money add-on sings this song, although it is a reused version of Bing Crosby's cover which can be heard in Radio New Vegas.
