= All My Tomorrows (Grover Washington Jr. album) =

Studio album by Grover Washington Jr.
- Released: 1994
- Recorded: February 22–24, 1994
- Studio: Van Gelder Studios (Englewood Cliffs, NJ)
- Genre: Jazz, R&B
- Length: 73:45
- Label: Columbia CK 64319
- Producer: Grover Washington Jr.; Todd Barkan

Grover Washington Jr. chronology
Next Exit (1992)	All My Tomorrows (1994)	Soulful Strut (1996)

All My Tomorrows is a studio album by American jazz saxophonist Grover Washington Jr. The album was released in 1994 on Columbia Records label. The album is his fifth for Columbia and twenty-fourth overall as a leader; also this is his first all-acoustic record.

== Critical reception ==
Professional ratings
Review scores
Source	Rating
AllMusic	1.5/5 stars
The Buffalo News	4.5/5 stars
Los Angeles Times	3/4 stars
The Penguin Guide to Jazz Recordings	3/4 stars
The Philadelphia Inquirer	3.5/5 stars
The Rolling Stone Jazz & Blues Album Guide	2/5 stars

Jeff Simon of The Buffalo News in a 4.5/5 stars rating remarked, "It's the very quiet and intimacy and unassuming beauty of this record that make it his best in many years -- from the opening bossa nova "E Preciso Perdovar" with guitarist Romero Lubambo to the finale "Estate" with just this disc's basic quartet. Playing with pianist Hank Jones only brings out the fact that a soulful and beautiful sound like Washington's belongs to no jazz era but to all jazz eras simultaneously (that's true no matter which saxophone he picks up). And the brass voicings in the arrangements by Larris Willis and Slide Hampton couldn't be creamier. An exceptional disc." Andrew Hamilton of AllMusic wrote "Washington's Winelight album, one of his best, was laid-back also but Washington's M.O. was stamped all over it; here you need credits and liner notes for verification, and only the opening tune emits any sparks. An attempt to silence the die-hard jazz critics who considered him a lightweight, but a disappointment for his Mister Magic fans". Karl Stark of the Philadelphia Inquirer claimed, "not even a grouchy purist can complain much about All My Tomorrows, Washington's plush recording of ballads...subtle samba rhythms course much throughout this recording, which is studded with elegant horn work."

Calvin Wilson of the Kansas City Star hailed the album saying, ""All My Tomorrows" is an entertaining statement of post-bop allegiance, with Washington playing in top form. His solos are as expressive as they are engaging...All in all, a sweet success." With a 3 out of 4 stars rating Zan Stewart of the Los Angeles Times proclaimed "This album, while being touted as a “mainstream” session from saxman Washington, is really more high-quality easy-listening jazz, with tempos relaxed and solos reflecting the melodies of songs."

== Track listing ==
No.	Title	Writer(s)	Length
1.	"É Preciso Perdoar"	Carlos Coqueijo, Alcivando Luz	8:57
2.	"When I Fall in Love"	Edward Heyman, Victor Young	6:19
3.	"I'm Glad There Is You"	Jimmy Dorsey, Paul Madeira, Paul Mertz	6:58
4.	"Happenstance"	Grover Washington, Jr.	4:56
5.	"All My Tomorrows"	Sammy Cahn, James Van Heusen	6:18
6.	"Nature Boy"	Eden Ahbez	8:11
7.	"Please Send Me Someone to Love"	Percy Mayfield	4:03
8.	"Overjoyed"	Stevie Wonder	7:32
9.	"Flamingo"	Edmund Anderson, Ted Grouya	5:01
10.	"For Heaven's Sake"	Elise Bretton, Sherman Edwards, Donald Meyer	7:15
11.	"Estate ("Ess-Tah-Tay") (In Summer)"	Bruno Brighetti, Bruno Martino	8:57
Total length:			73:45

== Personnel ==
- Grover Washington, Jr. – soprano saxophone (1–6, 8, 10, 11), tenor sax soloist (7), alto saxophone (9)
- Hank Jones – acoustic piano
- Romero Lubambo – guitar (1), arrangements (1)
- George Mraz – bass
- Billy Hart – drums (1, 2, 4, 5, 7, 9, 10, 11)
- Lewis Nash – drums (3, 6, 8)
- Steve Berrios – percussion (1)
- Bobby Watson – alto saxophone (5, 7)
- Jimmy Cozier – baritone saxophone (5, 7)
- Bobby Lavell – tenor saxophone (5, 7)
- Robin Eubanks – trombone (2, 5, 7)
- Eddie Henderson – trumpet (1, 4, 9), flugelhorn (2, 5, 8)
- Earl Gardner – flugelhorn (5), trumpet (7)
- Todd Barkan – arrangements
- Slide Hampton – arrangements
- Robert Sadin – arrangements
- Larry Willis – arrangements
- Freddy Cole – vocals (3, 8, 10)
- Jeanie Bryson – vocals (10)

== Production ==
- George Butler – executive producer
- Grover Washington, Jr. – producer
- Todd Barkan – producer
- Rudy Van Gelder – recording, mixing, mastering
- Maureen Sickler – assistant engineer
- Paul Silverthorn – production coordinator
- Christine Washington – production coordinator
- Allen Weinberg – art direction, design
- Nana Watanabe – photography
