= I Gotta Right to Sing the Blues =

1932 song by Harold Arlen and Ted Koehler

"I Gotta Right to Sing the Blues" is a popular song with music by Harold Arlen and lyrics by Ted Koehler, published in 1932 for the Broadway show Earl Carroll's Vanities (1932). The song has become a jazz and blues standard. Popular recordings in 1933 and 1934 were those by Cab Calloway, Louis Armstrong and Benny Goodman.

== Notable recordings ==
- Ethel Merman (September 29, 1932) (her first solo date and the first recording of the song, backed by Nat Shilkret's orchestra)
- Cab Calloway & His Orchestra (November 30, 1932 - Brunswick 6460).
- Louis Armstrong & His Orchestra (January 26, 1933, Bluebird 5173).
- Lee Wiley & The Dorsey Brothers (March 7, 1933)
- Benny Goodman & His Orchestra (Jack Teagarden, trombone, vocals, October 18, 1933, Columbia 2835D).
- Louis Armstrong (1937)
- Billie Holiday (recorded on April 20, 1939, Commodore 527A).
- Jack Teagarden & His Orchestra (1939)
- Lena Horne (1941)
- Billie Holiday - Velvet Mood (1955)
- Art Tatum - Still More of the Greatest Piano of Them All (1955)
- Louis Armstrong - I've Got the World on a String (1957)
- Judy Garland - Alone (1957)
- Julie London - About the Blues (1957)
- Billy Eckstine - Billy Eckstine's Imagination (1958)
- Sam Cooke - Tribute to the Lady (1959)
- Eileen Farrell - I've Got a Right to Sing the Blues (1960)
- Frank Sinatra - Sinatra Sings of Love and Things (1962)
- Judy Holliday & Gerry Mulligan - Holliday with Mulligan (1980)
- Sarah Vaughan & the Count Basie Orchestra - Send in the Clowns (1981)
