= Come Dance with Me! (album) =

Studio album by Frank Sinatra
- Released: January 5, 1959
- Recorded: December 9, 22, 23, 1958
- Studio: Capitol Studio A (Hollywood)
- Genre: Traditional pop
- Length: 31:26
- Label: Capitol
- Producer: Dave Cavanaugh

Frank Sinatra chronology
Frank Sinatra Sings for Only the Lonely (1958)	Come Dance with Me! (1959)	Look to Your Heart (1959)

Professional ratings
Review scores
Source	Rating
AllMusic	5/5 stars
The Encyclopedia of Popular Music	5/5 stars
Uncut	4/5 stars

Come Dance with Me! is the sixteenth studio album by American vocalist Frank Sinatra, released on January 5, 1959.

Come Dance with Me! was Sinatra's most successful album, spending two and a half years on the Billboard charts. Stereo Review wrote in 1959 that "Sinatra swaggers his way with effortless verve through an appealing collection of bouncy standards, aptly described in the album notes as 'vocals that dance'".

At the Grammy Awards of 1960, Come Dance with Me! won the Grammy Award for Album of the Year, as well as Grammy Award for Best Vocal Performance, Male. Billy May won the Grammy Award for Best Arrangement.

Come Dance With Me stayed on Billboard's Pop album chart for 141 weeks, peaking at #2 for four weeks. The album remained in the top ten for 58 weeks, spending 29 weeks in the top ten in 1959 and another 29 weeks in the top ten in 1960.

== CD releases ==
In 1987, Capitol released Come Dance with Me! on compact disc with four extra songs not found on the original LP. The album was again remastered in 1998 for the "Entertainer of the Century" series of Sinatra reissues. This version includes the same four bonus tracks found on the 1987 release.

== Track listing ==
1. "Come Dance with Me" (Sammy Cahn, Jimmy Van Heusen) – 2:31
2. "Something's Gotta Give" (Johnny Mercer) – 2:38
3. "Just in Time" (Jule Styne, Betty Comden, Adolph Green) – 2:24
4. "Dancing in the Dark" (Arthur Schwartz, Howard Dietz) – 2:26
5. "Too Close for Comfort" (Jerry Bock, Larry Holofcener, George Weiss) – 2:34
6. "I Could Have Danced All Night" (Alan Jay Lerner, Frederick Loewe) – 2:40
7. "Saturday Night (Is the Loneliest Night of the Week)" (Cahn, Styne) – 1:54
8. "Day In, Day Out" (Rube Bloom, Mercer) – 3:25
9. "Cheek to Cheek" (Irving Berlin) – 3:06
10. "Baubles, Bangles & Beads" (Robert Wright, George Forrest) – 2:46
11. "The Song Is You" (Jerome Kern, Oscar Hammerstein II) – 2:43
12. "The Last Dance" (Cahn, Van Heusen) – 2:11
  CD reissue bonus tracks not included on the original 1959 release:
13. "It All Depends on You" (B.G. DeSylva, Lew Brown, Ray Henderson) – 2:06
14. "Nothing in Common" (duet with Keely Smith) (Cahn, Van Heusen) – 2:32
15. "Same Old Song and Dance" (Cahn, Van Heusen, Bobby Worth) – 2:52
16. "How Are Ya' Fixed for Love?" (duet with Keely Smith) (Cahn, Van Heusen) – 2:25

== Personnel ==
- Frank Sinatra - vocals
- Keely Smith - vocals (On "Nothing in Common" and "How Are Ya' Fixed for Love?" CD bonus tracks)
- Billy May - arranger, conductor
- Heinie Beau - arranger

== Charts ==
Chart (1959)	Peak position
Italian Albums (HitParadeItalia)	1

== Certifications ==
Region	Certification	Certified units/sales
United States (RIAA)	Gold	500,000^{^}
^{^} Shipments figures based on certification alone.
