= Lucky Numbers (album) =

Compilation album by Frank Sinatra
- Released: December 8, 1998
- Recorded: April 11, 1962 – September 19, 1979
- Genre: Traditional pop
- Length: 32:18
- Label: Reprise

Frank Sinatra chronology
The Capitol Years (1998)	Lucky Numbers (1998)	Sinatra '57 in Concert (1999)

Professional ratings
Review scores
Source	Rating
AllMusic	3/5 stars

Lucky Numbers is a 1998 compilation album by Frank Sinatra originally sold exclusively at the New York-New York casino in Las Vegas.

== Track listing ==
1. "Theme from New York, New York" (Fred Ebb, John Kander) - 3:26
2. "The Boys' Night Out" (Sammy Cahn, Jimmy Van Heusen) - 2:48
3. "Come Blow Your Horn" (Cahn, Van Heusen) - 3:08
4. "Pocketful of Miracles" (Cahn, Van Heusen) - 2:39
5. "Luck Be a Lady" (Frank Loesser) - 5:17
6. "That's Life" (Dean Kay Thompson, Kelly Gordon) - 3:10
7. "Pick Yourself Up" (Jerome Kern, Dorothy Fields) - 2:33
8. "Pennies from Heaven" (Arthur Johnston, Johnny Burke) - 3:29
9. "Here's to the Losers" (Jack Segal, Robert Wells) - 3:04
10. "Winners" (Joe Raposo) - 2:53

== Personnel ==
- Frank Sinatra - vocals
- Nelson Riddle - arranger, conductor
- Don Costa
- Billy May
- Neal Hefti
- Ernie Freeman
- Gordon Jenkins
