= All You Need Is Ears =

1979 book by George Martin

- First edition (UK)
- Author: George Martin, Jeremy Hornsby
- Language: English
- Genre: Autobiography
- Publisher: Macmillan (UK)
- Publication date: 1979
- Media type: Print (Hardback & Paperback)
- ISBN: 0-312-11482-6

All You Need Is Ears: The inside personal story of the genius who created The Beatles (ISBN 0-312-11482-6) is the 1979 memoir of The Beatles' producer George Martin, co-authored by Jeremy Hornsby. The book was republished in 1994. The title is a play-on-words to the 1967 Beatles song "All You Need Is Love".

The book describes Martin's early life as well as his career with EMI/Parlophone, where he first signed and produced The Beatles. He also describes working with some of the other artists he produced during the 1960s.
