= Hey! Jealous Lover =

Single by Frank Sinatra
- B-side: "You Forgot All the Words"
- Released: October 2, 1956
- Genre: Big band
- Length: 2:19
- Label: Capitol
- Songwriter(s): Sammy Cahn, Bee Walker, Kay Twomey

Frank Sinatra singles chronology
"Mind If I Make Love to You?" (1956)	"Hey! Jealous Lover" (1956)	"Can I Steal a Little Love" (1957)

"Hey! Jealous Lover" is a song written by Sammy Cahn, Bee Walker, and Kay Twomey and performed by Frank Sinatra featuring Nelson Riddle and His Orchestra. It reached #3 on the U.S. pop chart in 1956.

== Other versions ==
- Lita Roza released a version of the song on her 1956 EP Lita Roza.
- Mickey Katz and His Orchestra released a version of the song as the B-side to his 1957 single "Barmitzvah Special".
- Tex Beneke and His Orchestra released a version of the song on his 1957 EP Today's Hits.
- George Maharis released a version of the song on his 1964 album Tonight You Belong to Me.
- Earl Grant released a version of the song on his 1965 album Spotlight on Earl Grant.
- Count Basie released a version of the song on his 1989 compilation album Count Basie/The Standards.
