= Don't Worry 'bout Me =

1938 song by Rube Bloom and Ted Koehler

"Don't Worry 'Bout Me" is a 1938 song composed by Rube Bloom, with lyrics written by Ted Koehler. It was introduced in the "World's Fair" edition of the Cotton Club show in 1939. The first hit recording was in 1939 by Hal Kemp and His Orchestra (vocal by Bob Allen).

== Other notable recordings ==
- Billie Holiday – Last Recording with Ray Ellis and his Orchestra. Recording completed on March 11, 1959, and released in July the same year under MGM.
- Savannah Churchill – recorded on December 26, 1951, for RCA Victor (catalog No. 20-4773).
- Ella Fitzgerald, Count Basie, Joe Williams – One O'Clock Jump (Verve, 1956) note: Williams sings this tune with Basie's orchestra
- Chris Connor – Chris In Person [live recording] (Atlantic, 1959)
- Jack Sheldon – Jack Sheldon Sings (Butterfly, 1993).
- Frank Sinatra – This Is Sinatra! (1956), Where Are You (1957), Sinatra at the Sands (1966). His 1954 single reached No. 17 in the Billboard charts that year.
- Sarah Vaughan – with the Teddy Wilson Octet. Recorded on August 19, 1946, for Musicraft Records (catalog No. 421).
- Jimmy Young – recorded on April 1, 1951, for Polygon Records (catalog No. P.1006).
- Keith Jarrett – recorded as an encore, live in Tokyo 2002, for an ECM Records DVD (catalog No. 5501).
- Curtis Stigers – One More for the Road [recorded live with the Danish Radio Big Band in 2014] (Concord Jazz, 2017)
- Count Basie Orchestra with guest vocalist, Kurt Elling – All About That Basie (Concord Jazz, 2018)
- Joni Mitchell – Both Sides Now (Reprise, 2000)
- Barney Kessel: The Poll Winners (1957)
