= Nice 'n' Easy =

Studio album by Frank Sinatra
- Released: July 25, 1960
- Recorded: March 1–3, April 13, 1960
- Studio: Capitol Studio A (Hollywood)
- Genres: Vocal jazz; traditional pop; easy-listening
- Length: 39:33
- Label: Capitol
- Producer: Dave Cavanaugh

Frank Sinatra chronology
No One Cares (1959)	Nice 'n' Easy (1960)	All the Way (1961)

Professional ratings
Review scores
Source	Rating
AllMusic	5/5 stars
Billboard	positive
The Encyclopedia of Popular Music	5/5 stars
Uncut	4/5 stars

Nice 'n' Easy is the eighteenth studio album by Frank Sinatra, released on July 25, 1960.

All the songs, with the notable exception of the title song, are sung as ballads and were arranged and conducted by Nelson Riddle. The title song was a last-minute substitute for the originally planned "The Nearness of You," which did not appear on the original LP.

The album spent nine weeks at number one on the Billboard stereo album chart, and one week at number one on the corresponding mono album chart. At the 1961 Grammy Awards, Nice 'n' Easy was nominated for the Grammy Award as Album of the Year, Best Male Vocal Performance, Best Arrangement. The song "Nice 'n' Easy" was released as a single in 1960 and made it to number 60 on the charts. It was also recorded by Charlie Rich in 1964, Peggy Lee in 1966, Alex Chilton in 1989, Michael Buble in 2004, Natalie Cole in 2008, and Barbra Streisand in 2011.

Nancy Sinatra recorded a cover version as a single (Reprise Records RS.20756 "Happy" b/w " Nice 'n' Easy"); it is also included in the CD version of her album "Nancy" as a bonus track.

In 2000 it was voted number 545 in Colin Larkin's All Time Top 1000 Albums.

== Track listing ==
1. "Nice 'n' Easy" (Alan Bergman, Marilyn Keith, Lew Spence) – 2:45
2. "That Old Feeling" (Lew Brown, Sammy Fain) – 3:33
3. "How Deep Is the Ocean? (How High Is the Sky?)" (Irving Berlin) – 3:15
4. "I've Got a Crush on You" (George Gershwin, Ira Gershwin) – 2:16
5. "You Go to My Head" (J. Fred Coots, Haven Gillespie) – 4:28
6. "Fools Rush In (Where Angels Fear to Tread)" (Rube Bloom, Johnny Mercer) – 3:22
7. "Nevertheless (I'm in Love with You)" (Bert Kalmar, Harry Ruby) – 3:18
8. "(I Got A Woman Crazy For Me) She's Funny That Way" (Neil Moret, Richard A. Whiting) – 3:55
9. "Try a Little Tenderness" (Jimmy Campbell, Reginald Connelly, Harry M. Woods) – 3:22
10. "Embraceable You" (G. Gershwin, I. Gershwin) – 3:24
11. "Mam'selle" (Mack Gordon, Edmund Goulding) – 2:48
12. "Dream" (Mercer) – 2:57
  Bonus tracks included on the 1991 CD reissue:
13. "The Nearness of You" (Hoagy Carmichael, Ned Washington) – 2:43
14. "Someone to Watch Over Me" (G. Gershwin, I. Gershwin) – 2:57
15. "Day In, Day Out" (Bloom, Mercer) – 3:07
16. "My One and Only Love" (Robert Mellin, Guy Wood) – 3:12

The album was remixed and remastered in 2020. The bonus tracks for the CD are "The Nearness of You" and excerpts of the sessions for "I've Got a Crush on You" and "Nice 'n' Easy". "Someone to Watch Over Me", "Day In, Day Out", and "My One and Only Love", which came from totally unrelated sessions, were removed from this reissue.

== Certifications ==
Region	Certification	Certified units/sales
United States (RIAA)	Gold	500,000^{^}
^{^} Shipments figures based on certification alone.
