= Bee Walker =

American jazz musician

Bertha ("Bee") Walker (1898–1987) was an American composer and pianist.

Born as Bertha Wolpa in Indianapolis, Indiana, she became a ragtime pianist, demonstrating tunes in the music section of Woolworths stores, and recorded many piano rolls for the US Music Company of Chicago and occasionally for the Rythmodik Music Corporation of New York, revealing an extremely original style. It was while working for Woolworths that a talent scout discovered her and, eventually, secured her work as accompanist to such vaudeville performers as Bob Hope and Eddie Cantor.

Prior to 1923, she changed her name to Bertha Walker and cut a few rolls for the Ampico reproducing piano system and also the Aeolian Company, both in New York City.

During the 1950s, she toured extensively with ASCAP, entertaining the US troops.

She also composed music during her career, starting with Nutty Blues in 1918, but her most famous composition is "Hey! Jealous Lover", written in collaboration with Sammy Cahn and Kay Twomey in 1956 and made famous by Frank Sinatra.
