= Where Are You? (Frank Sinatra album) =

Studio album by Frank Sinatra
- Released: September 2, 1957
- Recorded: April 10 – May 1, 1957
- Studio: Capitol Studio A (Hollywood)
- Genres: Vocal jazz; traditional pop
- Length: 41:52 (Original mono LP)
- Label: Capitol

Frank Sinatra chronology
A Swingin' Affair! (1957)	Where Are You? (1957)	A Jolly Christmas from Frank Sinatra (1957)

Professional ratings
Review scores
Source	Rating
AllMusic	5/5 stars
The Encyclopedia of Popular Music	4/5 stars
Uncut	2/5 stars

Where Are You? is the thirteenth studio album by Frank Sinatra. It is the first album Sinatra recorded at Capitol without Nelson Riddle and instead with Gordon Jenkins, as well as the first he recorded in stereo. In 1970 it was re-issued as a ten track album under the name The Night We Called It a Day.

== Track listing ==
1. "Where Are You?" (Harold Adamson, Jimmy McHugh) – 3:30
2. "The Night We Called It a Day" (Matt Dennis, Tom Adair) – 3:28
3. "I Cover the Waterfront" (Johnny Green, Edward Heyman) – 2:58
4. "Maybe You'll Be There" (Rube Bloom, Sammy Gallop) – 3:07
5. "Laura" (David Raksin, Johnny Mercer) – 3:28
6. "Lonely Town" (Leonard Bernstein, Betty Comden, Adolph Green) – 4:12
7. "Autumn Leaves" (Jacques Prévert, Mercer, Joseph Kosma) – 2:52
8. "I'm a Fool to Want You" (Frank Sinatra, Jack Wolf, Joel Herron) – 4:51
9. "I Think of You" (Jack Elliott, Don Marcotte) – 3:04
10. "Where Is the One?" (Alec Wilder, Edwin Finckel) – 3:13
11. "There's No You" (Tom Adair, Hal Hopper) – 3:48
12. "Baby Won't You Please Come Home" (Charles Warfield, Clarence Williams) – 3:00
  CD reissue bonus tracks not included on the original 1957 release:
13. "I Can Read Between the Lines" (Sid Frank, Ray Getzov) – 2:43
14. "It Worries Me" (Fritz Schultz-Reichelt, Carl Sigman) – 2:53
15. "Rain (Falling from the Skies)" (Robert Mellin, Gunther Finlay) – 3:25
16. "Don't Worry 'Bout Me" (Rube Bloom, Ted Koehler) – 3:08

The song "I Think of You" is based on the lyrical E-flat major second theme of the first movement (Moderato) from Sergei Rachmaninoff's Piano Concerto No. 2 in C minor, Op. 18.

Early pressings of the original stereo album had only 11 tracks while the mono version had all 12 tracks. The stereo edition may have been missing "I Cover The Waterfront" because it was only recorded in mono. Later stereo pressings in some international markets and in boxed sets restored "Waterfront," beginning circa 1975 (in Holland).
