= I Love Paris =

1953 popular song written by Cole Porter

"I Love Paris" is a popular song written by Cole Porter and published in 1953. The song was introduced by Lilo in the role of La Mome in the musical Can-Can. A line in the song's lyrics inspired the title of the 1964 film Paris When It Sizzles.

== Notable recordings ==
- Les Baxter and His Orchestra had a number 13 hit in 1953.
- Stanley Black with London Philarmonic Orchestra recorded for London Records in 1967
- Bing Crosby recorded this for Decca on December 31, 1953, and included it in his album Bing Sings the Hits (1954). He also sang it on his GE TV show on January 3, 1954.
- Tony Martin released a version in 1953 as the A side of a RCA Victor 7" vinyl. The B side was "Stranger in Paradise".
- Michel Legrand released a version on his 1954 album, I Love Paris, which included an orchestral arrangement of the song.
- Caterina Valente released a German version of the song under the German title Ganz Paris träumt von der Liebe, which sold more than 900,000 copies in 1954.
- Ella Fitzgerald released a version on her 1956 album, Ella Fitzgerald Sings the Cole Porter Song Book.
- Cal Tjader released a version on his 1956 album Latin Kick.
- The Coasters released a version of the song on their 1958 album, Coasters. Two of the original Coasters had also been in The Robins, who had released a version of the song as a B-side in 1955.
- Screamin' Jay Hawkins released a version on his 1958 album At Home with Screamin' Jay Hawkins.
- The Hot Sardines recorded it on their debut album released in 2014.
- Stan Kenton – The Stage Door Swings (1958).
- Frank Sinatra and Maurice Chevalier sang the song for the soundtrack album of the 1960 film Can-Can, and Sinatra also re-recorded it as a solo recording the same year. This version was released on his Sinatra Sings of Love and Things album in 1962, and included as a bonus track on the Come Fly with Me CD.
- Andy Williams released a version on his 1960 album, Under Paris Skies.
- Etta Jones recorded it for the album Don't Go to Strangers (1960). It is used as a theme song in the TV series The Collection (2016).
- Doris Day recorded this song for her Showtime album in 1960.
- Al Hirt released a version on his 1961 album, He's the King and His Band, which was also featured on his greatest-hits album The Best of Al Hirt.
- Jacky Terrasson included the song in his 1994 self-titled album.
- Jack Jones released a version on his 1961 album, I've Got a Lot of Livin' To Do.
- Esther Phillips released a version on her 1975 album, Confessin' The Blues.
- Helen Merrill released a version on her 1984 album with Gordon Beck, No Tears... No Goodbyes.
- Peter Cincotti released a version on his 2004 album, On the Moon.
- Eleni Mandell recorded in 2005 a version for the soundtrack of a television commercial for the Carl's Jr. fast-food chain, starring Paris Hilton. It was released later that year as a single in the iTunes Store.
- Vanessa Paradis released a version on her 2009 album, Best of Vanessa Paradis.
- Stevie Holland recorded this song on the 2010 Original Cast Album, Love, Linda: The Life of Mrs. Cole Porter, from the show Love, Linda: The Life of Mrs. Cole Porter.
