= High Hopes (Frank Sinatra song) =

Single by Frank Sinatra

from the album All the Way
- B-side: "All My Tomorrows"
- Released: June 5, 1959 (single); 1961 (album version)
- Recorded: May 8, 1959
- Studio: Capitol (Hollywood)
- Genre: Show tune; pop
- Length: 2:41
- Label: Capitol
- Composer: Jimmy Van Heusen
- Lyricist: Sammy Cahn

Frank Sinatra singles chronology
"French Foreign Legion" / "Time After Time" (1959)	"High Hopes" / "All My Tomorrows" (1959)	"Talk to Me" / "They Came to Cordura" (1959)

"High Hopes" is a popular song first popularized by Frank Sinatra, with music written by James Van Heusen and lyrics by Sammy Cahn. It was introduced by Sinatra and child actor Eddie Hodges in the 1959 film A Hole in the Head, was nominated for a Grammy, and won an Oscar for Best Original Song at the 32nd Academy Awards.

== Description ==
The song describes two scenarios where animals do seemingly impossible acts. First, an ant moves a rubber tree plant all by himself, then a ram single-handedly puts a hole in a "billion-kilowatt dam." The desires of these animals are described by the chorus as "high, apple pie in the sky, hopes," although the song implies they ultimately accomplish them. The song finishes by comparing problems to toy balloons; the problem has gone away when the balloon is popped, as stated by the closing line, "Oops, there goes another problem, ker-plop."

== Performers ==
=== Frank Sinatra ===
"High Hopes" was originally recorded by American singer Frank Sinatra in 1959 in a hit version featuring a children's chorus, which was later included in his 1961 album All the Way. This version is not the one that appeared in the film, as the film version paired Sinatra with Eddie Hodges rather than with a children's chorus; also, the lyrics are slightly different, referring more directly to Anthony the Ant and The Bonanno, or Goodyear Plant and the FBI or Hoover Dam. The tune reached #30 on the Billboard Hot 100. The track peaked at #6 in the UK Singles Chart. Sinatra also recorded a version of the tune with different lyrics which was used as the theme song for the 1960 presidential campaign of John F. Kennedy.

=== Sammy Davis Jr. ===
Sammy Davis Jr. performed the song with a children's chorus at the 32nd Academy Awards ceremony, where it won the award for Best Original Song.

=== Dinah Shore ===
Dinah Shore recorded the song with a children's chorus in 1960.

=== Doris Day ===
Doris Day recorded a rather jazzy version of the song for her 1964 album, With a Smile and a Song. Her version was used in the credits to the 1998 animated film Antz.

=== Bing Crosby ===
Bing Crosby recorded the song for his 1968 album Thoroughly Modern Bing.

=== Harry Kalas ===
The song also was popularized in Philadelphia by the late Phillies play-by-play announcer Harry Kalas, who made the song his personal anthem. Kalas sang "High Hopes" after the Phillies won the 1993 National League pennant, and again after winning the 2008 World Series.

Beginning after his death in 2009, after each Phillies’ home win, the fans sing the song while the lyrics and a video of Kalas are played on the jumbotron above Harry the K's restaurant in left field of Citizens Bank Park.

=== Rick Logan ===
Rick Logan recorded a shortened version of the song with a women's chorus by Donna Davidson-Medine, Luana Jackman, Susie Stevens-Logan (his wife) and Bobbi Page for A Goofy Movie in 1995.

=== Franky Perez ===
Franky Perez, American singer and vocalist for Finnish symphonic metal band Apocalyptica, recorded a version of the song for the 2011 metal-inspired tribute album Sin-Atra.

=== Robbie Williams ===
English pop singer Robbie Williams performed the song on his Swings Both Ways Live tour in 2014, accompanied by a children's choir composed of students from each venue location's respective Stagecoach Theatre Arts school. The performance was included on the Swings Both Ways live album.

=== Craig Mack ===
Hip hop emcee Craig Mack looped portions of Sinatra's original song into his 1999 composition "Wooden Horse", which was used on the soundtrack of the film What's the Worst That Could Happen?

== In popular culture ==
- 85th Academy Awards – The song was performed by Seth MacFarlane, Joseph Gordon-Levitt, and Daniel Radcliffe during the 2013 Academy Awards ceremony.
- The Rat Pack – A customized version of the song is performed by the Rat Pack, consisting of Frank Sinatra (portrayed by Ray Liotta), Dean Martin (Joe Mantegna), Sammy Davis Jr. (Don Cheadle), Peter Lawford (Angus MacFadyen) and Joey Bishop (Bobby Slayton), at a fundraiser for John F. Kennedy's 1960 presidential election campaign.
- Another customized version was sung on the Danny Thomas Show (season 7, episode 8), Nov 23, 1959, where Danny sings it with his TV son.
- The song was featured in an episode of the animated series Kid Power.
- The Simpsons (episode 1F01 "Rosebud") – Principal Skinner, voiced by Harry Shearer, sings the song with a mob.
- Laverne and Shirley – The title characters sing the song in numerous episodes to cheer themselves up when down on their luck.
- Rocky Balboa – The announcers play the original 1959 recording of the song on the loudspeakers when Rocky Balboa enters the ring. He at first doubts when hearing the song that his brother-in-law "Paulie Pennino" has chosen, but later says "He's very good, Sinatra".
- A Goofy Movie - During the road trip Max turns on the radio to listen to acid rock music then Goofy puts in a 8-track tape and sings along to the song "High Hopes". But Max switches it back to acid rock music and Goofy switches it back to the song. They fight over the radio causing the 8-track tape to spit out parts of the taping and the radio to explode while Max declares that they don't have any music to listen to now.
- Muppets Tonight (episode 207 "Rick Moranis") – While telling Seymour and Pepe that they need to have skill, patience and high hopes, Moranis begins singing the song. However, Seymour interrupts by smashing the ant, who later taken in an ambulance prompting Moranis to continue singing including the ant's injury in the lyrics ("That dead ant had high hopes/Before you smashed him, he had high apple pie in the sky hopes.").
- Captain Kangaroo (many episodes)
- Ramona Quimby, Age 8 – In chapter 1, Ramona's dad sings the song's chorus with rather nonsensical lyrics that he came up with himself.
- On All My Children, the citizens of Pine Valley sing the song at Stuart Chandler's funeral as a tribute.
- High Hopes theme tune – a version played on a harp is used for the opening and closing credits.
- The Middle (S3E14 "Hecking It Up") – the Heck family sings the song in the car to cheer up Sue.
- The 1998 animated film Antz features the Doris Day version of the song, heard during the credits.

== Legacy ==
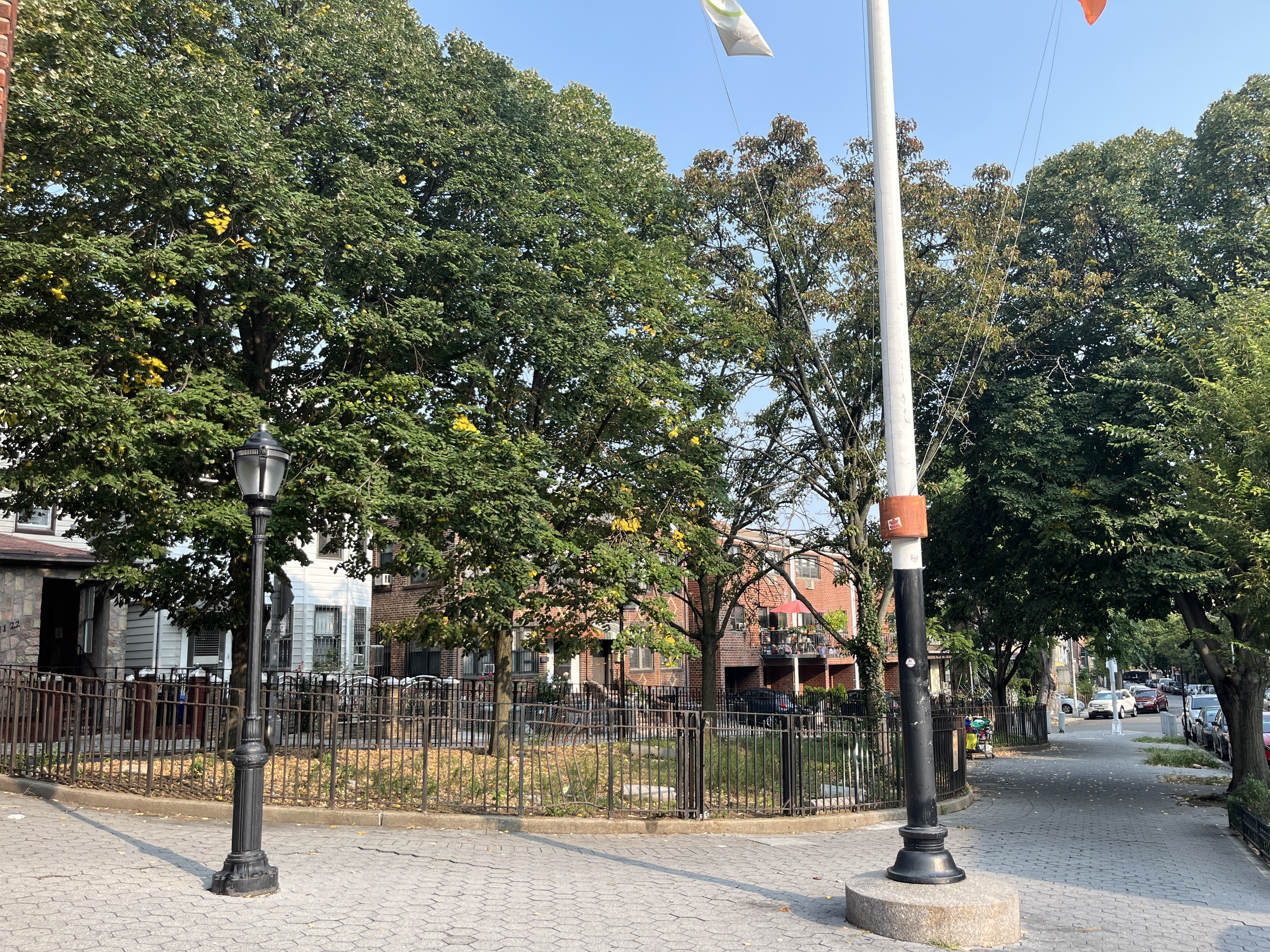
Image of High Hopes Triangle

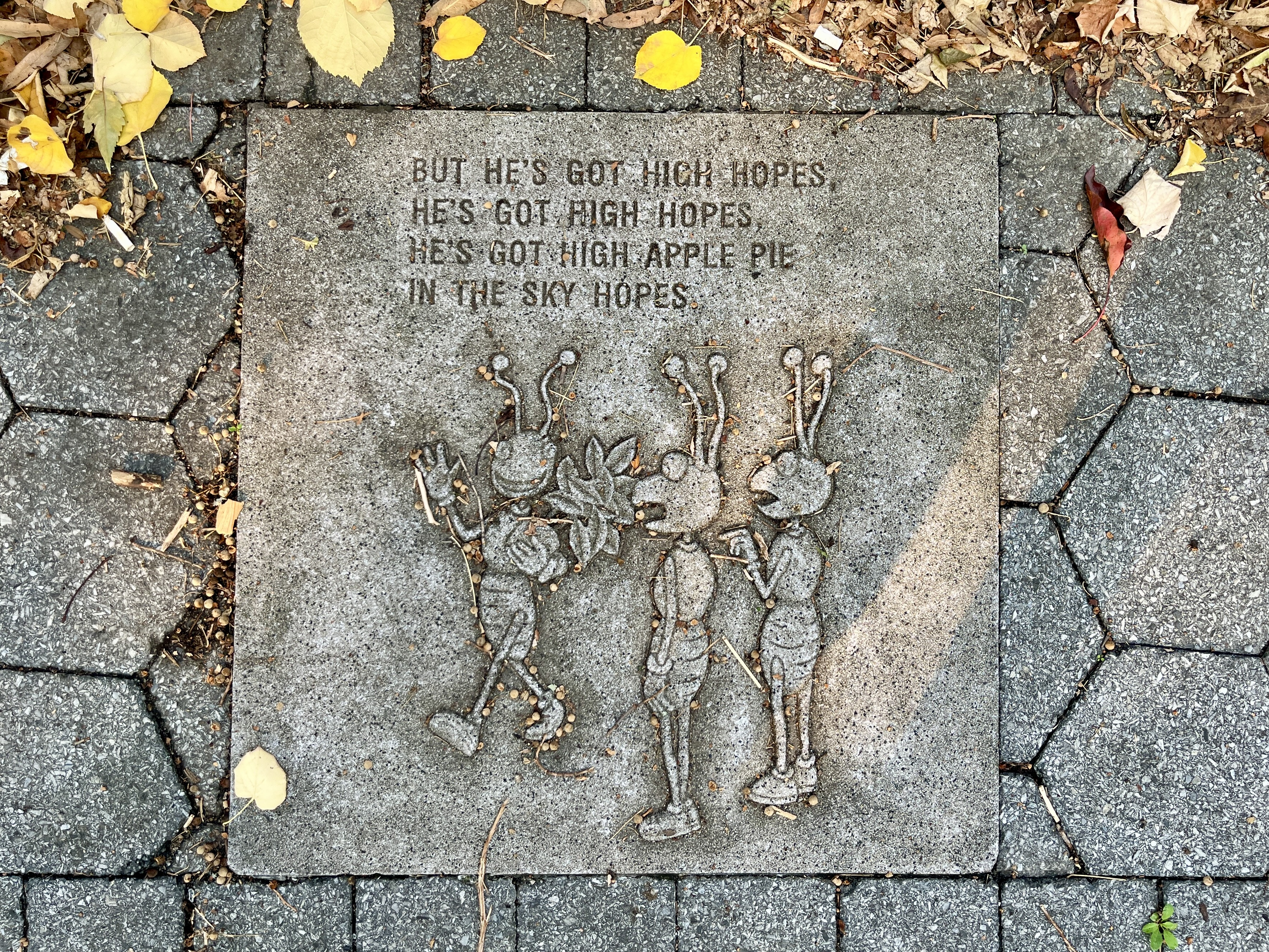
One of the concrete tiles featuring lyrics from "High Hopes" at High Hopes Triangle in Woodside, Queens.

"High Hopes" is commemorated in Queens, New York by a park named High Hopes Triangle located in the neighborhood of Woodside. This trianglular parklet lies at the meeting point of 66th Street and 67th Street, just north of Woodside Boulevard; these streets were formerly Burroughs Avenue and Lee Avenue. The park was commemorated in 1999 by Mayor Rudolph Giuliani, Borough President Claire Shulman, and New York State Senator John Sabini.

High Hopes Triangle is managed by the New York City Parks Department. In addition to a stone marker with the park's name, the park features a series of concrete tiles that feature anthropomorphized ants alongside lyrics from the song.
