= Hank Sanicola =

American businessman and musician (1914–1974)

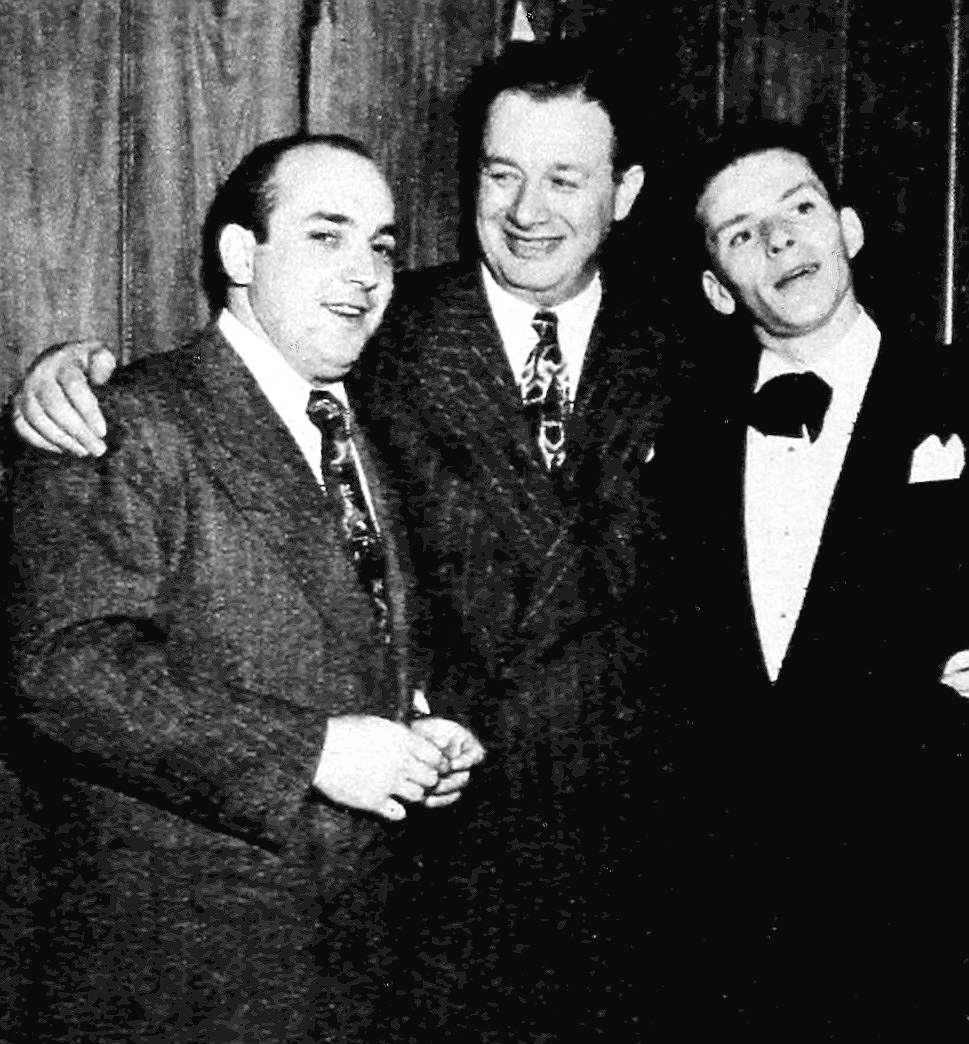
- Sanicola (left), Toots Shor (center), and Frank Sinatra (right) in 1947

Background information
- Born: Henry William Sanicola; 14 June 1914
- Died: 6 October 1974
- Instrument: Piano
- Years active: 1930s–1974

Henry William "Hank" Sanicola (14 June 1914 – 6 October 1974) was an American music manager, publisher, businessman and pianist, best known for his work and association with Frank Sinatra from the late 1930s to the early 1960s.

== Early life ==
Sanicola was born into an Italian-American family that had its roots in Sicily. Physically large, he was a boxer in his youth and entered the music business as a roadhouse piano player.

== Work with Frank Sinatra ==
Sanicola was Sinatra's original manager and "song plugger" from the late 1930s onwards. The two met in 1936 when Sanicola was promoting records for Warner Bros. Records. Due to their similar backgrounds, the two began working together with Sanicola finding jobs where he played the piano and Sinatra would sing. Sanicola was one of Sinatra's closest friends, and also served as his bodyguard during Sinatra's performances with the Tommy Dorsey band. The two were involved in several business ventures, including a partnership with Ben Barton of Barton Music Corp, and several boxing promotions. The two had a permanent falling-out in 1963 following pressure from the authorities on Sinatra to sell his Cal Neva Lodge & Casino, in which Sanicola had a 33 percent share.

Sinatra once said that Sanicola was "one of the five most important people in my life. I couldn't have made it without him". In return, Sanicola said:

I was always his right arm, the strong right arm. I know how to fight. I was an amateur fighter. I used to step in and hit guys when they started ganging up on Frank in bars. We were both of Sicilian origin, both Italians, so we became good friends. When Frank wasn't working, I would arrange a club date for him and go along to accompany him. We knew, both of us, that it was only a question of time until somebody bought Frank.

Many credited Sanicola with helping Frank diversify his business interests as a hedge against the rise and fall of popularity. Sanicola and Sinatra co-wrote several songs, including "Mistletoe and Holly" (1957) (with Doc Stanford); "Mr. Success" (1958) (with Edwin Greines), which charted in the Top 50 in the U.S. and the Top 30 in the UK; and "This Love of Mine" (1941) (music by Sol Parker), which they sold to Tommy Dorsey.

== Later work and death ==
After the split with Sinatra, Sanicola continued representing singers, including Billy Andre and Tony Gato, but none with the same success as Frank. Sanicola also had business interests in the Puccini restaurant. Sanicola died of a heart attack at the age of 60 in October 1974 and was buried at Forest Lawn Cemetery in Cathedral City. He was survived by his wife Paula and a son and daughter Joan Alicata.

== In popular culture ==
Sanicola was portrayed by actor Vincent Guastaferro in the 1992 biographical miniseries Sinatra, alongside Philip Casnoff as Frank Sinatra.
