= Love and Marriage =

Original song composed by Jimmy Van Heusen, lyrics by Sammy Cahn

"Love and Marriage" is a 1955 song with lyrics by Sammy Cahn and music by Jimmy Van Heusen. It was introduced and popularized by Frank Sinatra, whose recording reached #5 on the Billboard chart and #3 on the UK singles chart.

== Frank Sinatra versions ==
"Love and Marriage"

Single by Frank Sinatra

from the album This Is Sinatra!
- B-side: "The Impatient Years"
- Released: October 17, 1955
- Recorded: August 15, 1955
- Studio: Capitol Studios, Hollywood, California
- Genre: Show tune; pop
- Length: 2:37
- Label: Capitol
- Composer: Jimmy Van Heusen
- Lyricist: Sammy Cahn

Frank Sinatra singles chronology
"Same Old Saturday Night" (1955)	"Love and Marriage" (1955)	"(Love Is) The Tender Trap" (1955)

"Love and Marriage" was introduced by Frank Sinatra in the 1955 television production of Thornton Wilder's Our Town, which aired on Producers' Showcase. Sinatra went on to record two versions of the song. The first was recorded for Capitol Records on August 15, 1955, and became a major chart hit. (A competing version by Dinah Shore also achieved popularity.) This first recording appeared on the 1956 album This Is Sinatra! The second version was recorded for the Reprise Records album A Man and His Music on October 11, 1965. The Capitol version was later used as the theme song for the 1987–1997 Fox TV sitcom Married... with Children.

Although both versions were arranged by Nelson Riddle, there are many slight but noticeable differences. For instance:

- In the Capitol version, the opening lyrics are "Love and marriage. Love and marriage go together like a horse and carriage." In the Reprise version, the opening lyrics are "Love and marriage. Love and marriage. They go together like a horse and carriage."
- The Capitol version includes a crescendoing instrumental bridge, which was later played over the closing credits of Married... with Children. This bridge is missing from the Reprise version.
- In the Reprise version, Sinatra ends the song by saying (not singing), "No, sir." The ending of the Capitol version is an instrumental version of "Shave and a Haircut" with a bassoon playing the final two notes solo – a C flat and a B flat. (Traditionally, when played in B♭ major, the last two notes of "Shave and a Haircut" are an A natural and a B flat.)

As part of Producers' Showcase, "Love and Marriage" won the 1956 Emmy Award for Best Musical Contribution.

== Other versions and uses in media ==
- Included in Peggy Lee 1961 Capitol T-1475 LP album Olé ala Lee.
- Dinah Shore sang it in 1955 when it briefly reached No. 20 on the U.S. Song charts.
- Bing Crosby recorded the song in 1955 for use on his radio show and it was subsequently included in the box set The Bing Crosby CBS Radio Recordings (1954-56) issued by Mosaic Records (catalog MD7-245) in 2009.
- The tune was also used for a series of commercials for Duncan Hines Chocolate Chip cookies in 1984 and 1985.
