= Five Minutes More =

1946 song by Jule Styne and Sammy Cahn;

"Five Minutes More" is a 1946 American pop song written by Sammy Cahn (lyrics) and Jule Styne (music). It is sometimes referred to as "Give Me Five Minutes More". It was featured in the movie Sweetheart of Sigma Chi, sung by Phil Brito, and was a number one hit record in 1946 for Frank Sinatra.

The song was written by Cahn and Styne for Sweetheart of Sigma Chi. Sinatra's recording for Columbia Records was reviewed by Billboard in July 1946. They said: "Sinatra sings it light and airy to good effect for a ditty that is inherently tuneful and catching." Other recordings were made at that time by Bob Crosby, Tex Beneke, Harry Cool, Phil Brito, and The Three Suns. Tex Beneke and the Glenn Miller Orchestra recorded the song on May 27, 1946, RCA Victor 20–1922, with "Texas Tex" on the B-side. According to Joel Whitburn, Sinatra's recording reached no.1 on the US pop chart on 14 September 1946, remaining there for four weeks. The song ended up at number four on the year-end charts for 1946.

In England, the song was popularised by the Ross Sisters, an American trio who performed it in the show Piccadilly Hayride in London between late 1946 and 1948. A recording was also made by The Skyrockets Orchestra, conductor Paul Fenoulhet with vocal by Doreen Lundy, recorded in London on November 14, 1946, and released by EMI on the His Master's Voice label as catalogue number BD 5955. Sinatra re-recorded the song in 1961 for the album Come Swing With Me, and the track was released as a single the following year. On 9 May 2015 the band Blue performed the song at VE Day 70: A Party to Remember at Horse Guards Parade in London. Others who recorded the song were Bing Crosby, Dick Haymes, Homer & Jethro, (all in 1946) Robin Luke in 1959, Herb Alpert 1966, R. Stevie Moore 1992, and The Outlaws 2011.
