= Carolyn Leigh =

American pop music lyricist (1926–1983)

- Born: August 21, 1926
- Origin: New York City, U.S.
- Died: November 19, 1983 (aged 57) New York City, U.S.
- Occupation: Lyricist
- Formerly of: Cy Coleman

Carolyn Leigh (August 21, 1926 – November 19, 1983) was an American lyricist for Broadway, film, and popular songs. She is best known as the writer with partner Cy Coleman of the pop standards "Witchcraft" and "The Best Is Yet to Come". With Johnny Richards, she wrote the million-seller "Young at Heart" for the 1954 film Young at Heart, starring Frank Sinatra.

== Biography ==
Leigh was born to a Jewish family in the Bronx, New York, graduated from Hunter College High School, Queens College, and New York University.

Leigh worked as a copy writer for radio stations and advertising agencies. Always writing stories and poems, in 1951, when urged to write songs by a musical publisher who gave her a contract, she wrote "I'm Waiting Just for You" with Henry Glover, and two years later, "Young at Heart."

Leigh's lyrics for Broadway shows include Peter Pan, Wildcat, Little Me, and How Now, Dow Jones. The last was an original idea of Leigh's, though Max Shulman wrote the script. She provided lyrics for the scores to the films The Cardinal in 1963 and Father Goose in 1964. In 1969 she wrote the lyrics for the musical Gatsby, with the score by Lee Pockriss and book by Hugh Wheeler. She wrote the lyrics for two other unproduced musicals,Caesar's Wife, again with music by Pockriss, about Julius Caesar's third wife, Calpurnia, and Juliet, based on the Fellini movie Juliet of the Spirits, with music by Morton Gould.

Leigh was working with Marvin Hamlisch on the musical Smile when she died on November 19, 1983, of a heart attack. She was divorced from her first husband Julius Levine in 1959 and married David Cunningham Jr. the same year. Leigh was inducted posthumously into the Songwriters Hall of Fame in 1985.

== Tony Award nominations ==
- Little Me (1963) - Tony Award for Best Original Score
- How Now, Dow Jones (1968) - Tony Award for Best Original Score
