= Rube Bloom =

American musician and writer (1902–1976)

Reuben Bloom (April 24, 1902 – March 30, 1976) was an American songwriter, pianist, arranger, band leader, recording artist, vocalist, and author.

== Life and career ==
Bloom was born and died in New York City. He was Jewish.

During his career, he worked with many well-known performers, including Bix Beiderbecke, Joe Venuti, Ruth Etting, Stan Kenton, Tommy and Jimmy Dorsey. He collaborated with a wide number of lyricists, including Johnny Mercer, Ted Koehler, and Mitchell Parish.

During the 1920s he wrote many novelty piano solos, which are still well regarded today. He recorded for the Aeolian Company's Duo-Art reproducing piano system various titles including his "Spring Fever". His first hit came in 1927 with "Soliloquy"; his last was "Here's to My Lady" in 1952, which he wrote with Johnny Mercer. In 1928, he made a number of records with Joe Venuti's Blue Four for OKeh, including five songs he sang, as well as played piano.

Bloom formed and led a number of bands during his career, most notably Rube Bloom and His Bayou Boys, which recorded three records in 1930, that were considered some of the best made early in the Depression. The Bayou Boys was an all-star studio group consisting of Benny Goodman, Adrian Rollini, Tommy Dorsey and Mannie Klein. At other times, Bloom played with other bands, such as with Bix Beiderbecke and Frankie Trumbauer in the Sioux City Six and his frequent work with Joe Venuti's Blue Four.

Bloom's "I Can't Face the Music" was recorded by Ella Fitzgerald on her 1962 Verve release, Rhythm is My Business, in a swing/big band version with Bill Doggett.

Bloom published several books on piano method during his lifetime.

Rube Bloom is buried in Beth David Cemetery at Elmont, New York.

Folkways released an album of his and Arthur Schutt's recordings.

== Songs ==
- "Here's to My Lady" (1952) - lyrics by Johnny Mercer
- "Day In, Day Out" - lyrics by Johnny Mercer
- "Don't Worry 'Bout Me" - lyrics by Ted Koehler
- "Fools Rush In (Where Angels Fear to Tread)" - lyrics by Johnny Mercer
- "Give Me the Simple Life“ - with Harry Ruby
- "Good-for-Nothin' Joe" - lyrics by Ted Koehler
- "I Can't Face the Music" - lyrics by Ted Koehler
- "Lost in a Dream" - lyrics by Edgar Leslie
- "Maybe You'll Be There" - lyrics by Sammy Gallop
- "Out in the Cold Again" - lyrics by Ted Koehler
- "Take Me" - lyrics by Mack David
- "The Man from South"
- "Truckin'" (revised as "Ev'rybody's Twistin'" (Frank Sinatra, 1962)
- "What Goes Up Must Come Down"
- "Mysterious Mose"
- "Duo-Art Piano Roll #713297 "Just a Bird's-Eye View" Arr and Played by Rube Bloom

== Sources ==
- Jaques Cattell Press (Ed.): Who's who in American Music. Classical. First edition. R. R. Bowker, New York 1983. ISBN 9780835217255
- Stanley Sadie, H. Wiley Hitchcock (Ed.): The New Grove Dictionary of American Music. Grove's Dictionaries of Music, New York, N.Y. 1986. ISBN 978-0943818368
- Barry Dean Kernfeld: The New Grove Dictionary of Jazz. Macmillan Press, London 1988. ISBN 9780312113575
- Michael Cuscuna, Michel Ruppi: The Blue Note label. A Discography. Greenwood Press, Westport, Conn. 2001. ISBN 9780789304933
