= Frank Sinatra discography =

Recordings by American singer and actor

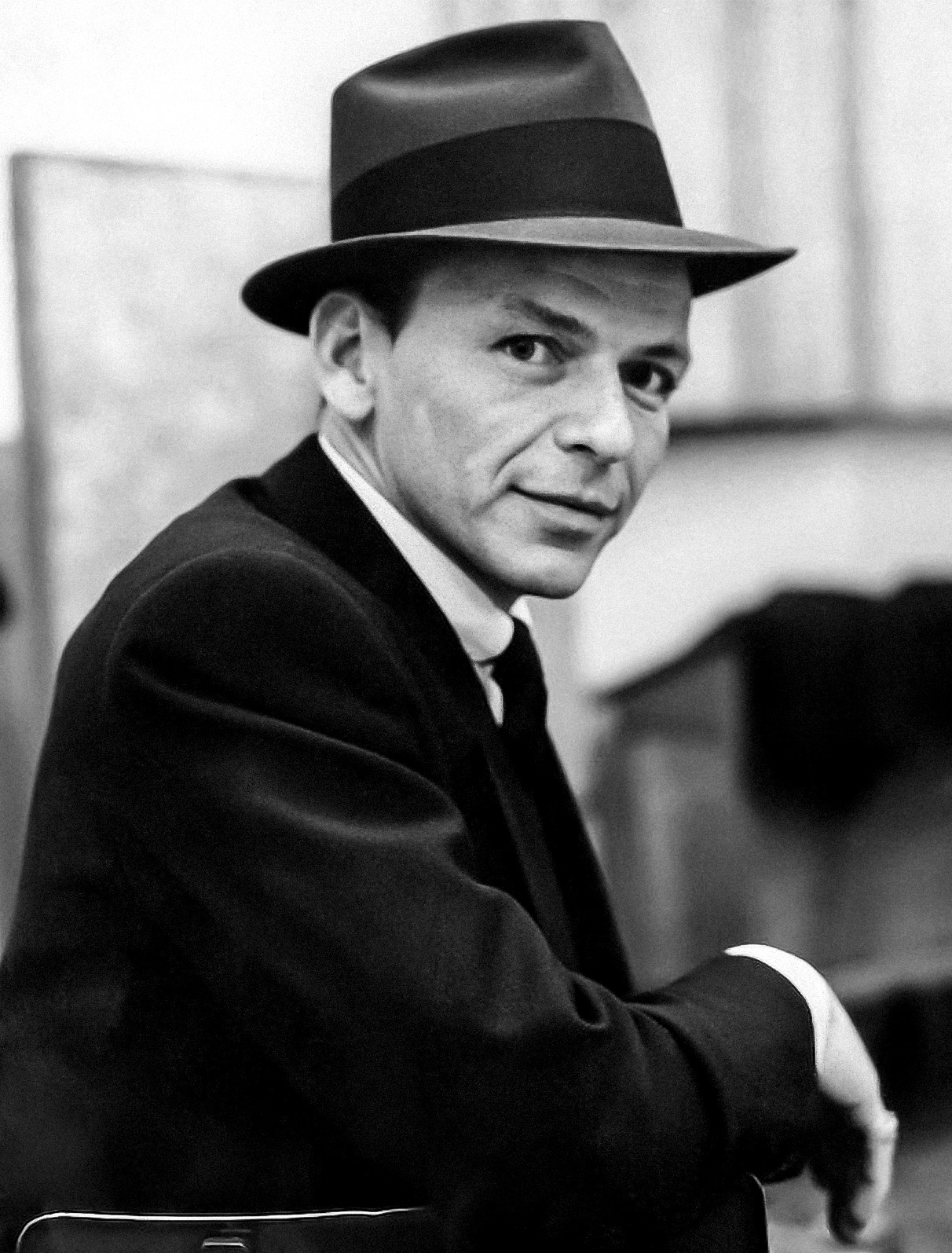
- At Capitol Studios, Hollywood, 1957
- Studio albums: 74
- Extended plays: 105
- Soundtrack albums: 8
- Live albums: 35
- Compilation albums: 169
- Singles: 297
- Box sets: 38
- Posthumous compilations: 80
- Rat Pack compilations: 4
- Rat Pack live albums: 4
- Albums conducted by Sinatra: 7

American vocalist Frank Sinatra recorded 59 studio albums and 297 singles in his solo career, spanning 54 years.

Sinatra after having had stints with the quartet The Hoboken Four and with the orchestras of Harry James and Tommy Dorsey, launched a solo career in 1943, signing with Columbia Records; his debut album The Voice of Frank Sinatra was issued in 1946. Sinatra would achieve greater success with Capitol and Reprise Records, the former of which he released his final two albums on—Duets and Duets II. Eight compilation albums under Sinatra's name were released in his lifetime, with more albums released following his death in 1998.

== Albums ==
=== Studio albums ===
Columbia Records introduced the modern Long Play record on June 21, 1948; prior to that, record albums were sets of 78 rpm records in cardboard and paper sleeves, resembling a photo album, usually containing two to four records per album. Sinatra's Capitol studio albums were released on Concepts in 1992, and the bulk of his Capitol recordings released on the 1998 album The Capitol Years.

==== 1940s/50s ====
Title	Album details	Peak chart positions			Certifications
Title	Album details	US	CAN	UK	Certifications
The Voice of Frank Sinatra	Released: March 4, 1946; Label: Columbia	1	—	—	
Songs by Sinatra	Released: April 1947; Label: Columbia	2	—	—	
Christmas Songs by Sinatra	Released: November 1948; Label: Columbia	7	—	—	
Frankly Sentimental	Released: June 20, 1949; Label: Columbia	—	—	—	
Dedicated to You	Released: March 1950; Label: Columbia	—	—	—	
Sing and Dance with Frank Sinatra	Released: October 16, 1950; Label: Columbia	—	—	—	
Songs for Young Lovers	Released: January 1954; Label: Capitol	3	—	—	
Swing Easy!	Released: August 2, 1954; Label: Capitol	3	—	5	BPI: Gold
In the Wee Small Hours	Released: April 1955; Label: Capitol	2	—	—	RIAA: Gold; BPI: Silver
Songs for Swingin' Lovers!	Released: March 1956; Label: Capitol	2	—	1	RIAA: Gold; BPI: Gold
Close to You	Released: January 1957; Label: Capitol	5	—	2	
A Swingin' Affair!	Released: June 1957; Label: Capitol	2	—	1	
Where Are You?	Released: September 1957; Label: Capitol	3	—	—	
A Jolly Christmas from Frank Sinatra (retitled The Sinatra Christmas Album)	Released: September 21, 1957; Label: Capitol	18	—	93	RIAA: Platinum ("A Jolly Christmas from Frank Sinatra]"); RIAA: Platinum ("The Sinatra Christmas Album"); BPI: Silver (2007 version)
Come Fly with Me	Released: January 1958; Label: Capitol	1	—	2	RIAA: Gold
Frank Sinatra Sings for Only the Lonely	Released: September 1958; Label: Capitol	1	—	5	RIAA: Gold
Come Dance with Me!	Released: January 1959; Label: Capitol	2	1	2	RIAA: Gold
No One Cares	Released: July 1959; Label: Capitol	2	—	—	

==== 1960s ====
Title	Album details	Peak chart positions			Certifications
Title	Album details	US	CAN	UK	Certifications
Nice 'n' Easy	Released: July 1960; Label: Capitol	1	1	2	RIAA: Gold
Sinatra's Swingin' Session!!!	Released: January 1961; Label: Capitol	3	—	6	
Ring-a-Ding-Ding!	Released: March 1961; Label: Reprise	4	—	9	
Come Swing with Me!	Released: July 1961; Label: Capitol	8	—	13	
Swing Along With Me (retitled Sinatra Swings)	Released: July 1961; Label: Reprise	6	—	8	
I Remember Tommy	Released: October 1961; Label: Reprise	3	—	10	
Sinatra and Strings	Released: January 1962; Label: Reprise	8	—	6	
Point of No Return	Released: March 1962; Label: Capitol	19	—	—	
Sinatra and Swingin' Brass	Released: July 1962; Label: Reprise	18	—	14	
All Alone	Released: October 1962; Label: Reprise	25	—	—	
Sinatra Sings Great Songs from Great Britain	Released: November 1962; Label: Reprise	—	—	12	
Sinatra–Basie: An Historic Musical First (with Count Basie)	Released: December 10, 1962; Label: Reprise	16	—	2	
The Concert Sinatra	Released: May 1963; Label: Reprise	6	—	8	
Sinatra's Sinatra	Released: August 1963; Label: Reprise	8	—	7	RIAA: Gold
Sinatra Sings Days of Wine and Roses, Moon River, and Other Academy Award Winners	Released: March 1964; Label: Reprise	10	—	—	
America, I Hear You Singing (with Bing Crosby and Fred Waring)	Released: April 1964; Label: Reprise	116	—	—	
It Might as Well Be Swing (with Count Basie)	Released: August 1964; Label: Reprise	13	—	17	
12 Songs of Christmas (with Bing Crosby and Fred Waring)	Released: August 1964; Label: Reprise	— (Note: 12 Songs of Christmas was not eligible to enter the Billboard 200 chart, but peaked at number nine on the Billboard Christmas LP's chart in 1964.)	—	—	
Softly, as I Leave You	Released: November 1964; Label: Reprise	19	—	20	
September of My Years	Released: August 1965; Label: Reprise	5	—	—	RIAA: Gold
My Kind of Broadway	Released: November 1965; Label: Reprise	30	—	—	
A Man and His Music	Released: November 1965; Label: Reprise	9	—	—	RIAA: Platinum
Moonlight Sinatra	Released: March 1966; Label: Reprise	34	—	—	
Strangers in the Night	Released: May 1966; Label: Reprise	1	—	4	RIAA: Platinum
That's Life	Released: December 31, 1966; Label: Reprise	6	—	22	RIAA: Gold; BPI: Silver
Francis Albert Sinatra & Antonio Carlos Jobim (with Antonio Carlos Jobim)	Released: March 1967; Label: Reprise	19	—	—	
The World We Knew	Released: August 1967; Label: Reprise	24	—	28	
Francis A. & Edward K. (with Duke Ellington)	Released: January 1968; Label: Reprise	78	—	—	
The Sinatra Family Wish You a Merry Christmas (with Frank Sinatra, Jr., Nancy Sinatra and Tina Sinatra)	Released: September 1968; Label: Reprise	— (Note: The Sinatra Family Wish You a Merry Christmas was not eligible to enter the Billboard 200 chart, but peaked at number three on the Billboard Christmas LP's chart in 1969.)	—	—	
Cycles	Released: November 1968; Label: Reprise	18	9	—	RIAA: Gold
My Way	Released: March 1969; Label: Reprise	11	9	2	RIAA: Gold; ARIA: 3× Platinum; BVMI: Gold
A Man Alone	Released: August 1969; Label: Reprise	30	19	18	
Sinatra Jobim	Released: 1969; Label: Reprise; 8-track only - just a few thousand released	—	—	—	

==== 1970s/80s ====
Title	Album details	Peak chart positions				Certifications
Title	Album details	US	AUS	CAN	UK	Certifications
Watertown	Released: March 1970; Label: Reprise	101	—	60	14	
Sinatra & Company (with Antonio Carlos Jobim)	Released: March 1971; Label: Reprise	73	23	65	9	
Ol' Blue Eyes Is Back	Released: September 1973; Label: Reprise	13	19	20	12	RIAA: Gold; ARIA: Gold; BPI: Gold
Some Nice Things I've Missed	Released: July 1974; Label: Reprise	48	28	41	35	BPI: Silver
Trilogy: Past Present Future	Released: March 1980; Label: Reprise	17	62	—	—	RIAA: Gold
She Shot Me Down	Released: November 1981; Label: Reprise	52	—	—	—	
L.A. Is My Lady	Released: August 1984; Label: Qwest	58	66	75	41	

==== 1990s ====
Title	Album details	Peak chart positions				Certifications
Title	Album details	US	AUS	CAN	UK	Certifications
Duets	Released: November 2, 1993; Label: Capitol	2	2	21	5	RIAA: 3× Platinum; ARIA: 2× Platinum; BPI: Platinum; CRIA: 2× Platinum
Duets II	Released: November 15, 1994; Label: Capitol	9	16	28	29	RIAA: Platinum; BPI: Silver; CRIA: Platinum

=== Soundtrack albums ===
Title	Album details	Peak chart positions			Certifications
Title	Album details	US	CAN	UK	Certifications
Young at Heart (w/ Doris Day)	Released: November 1, 1954; Label: Columbia	15	—	—	
High Society (w/ Bing Crosby and Grace Kelly - LP version)	Released: July 1956; Label: Capitol Records	5	—	—	
Pal Joey (w/ Rita Hayworth and Kim Novak - LP version)	Released: 1957; Label: Capitol Records	2	—	—	

=== Extended play albums ===
Title	Album details	Peak chart positions			Certifications
Title	Album details	US	CAN	UK	Certifications
Frank Sinatra Sings Irving Berlin	Released: 1952; Label: Columbia	—	—	—	
Sings Hits From: South Pacific/Oklahoma!	Released: 1952; Label: Columbia	—	—	—	
Sinatra Sings Cole Porter	Released: 1953; Label: Columbia	—	—	—	
Frank Sinatra Sings George Gershwin	Released: 1953; Label: Columbia	—	—	—	
Rodgers and Hammerstein's 'Carousel' Sung by Frank Sinatra	Released: 1953; Label: Columbia	—	—	—	
Frank Sings Jerome Kern	Released: 1953; Label: Columbia	—	—	—	
Young-at-Heart	Released: 1954; Label: Capitol Records	—	—	—	
Swing Easy! Part 1	Released: 1954; Label: Capitol Records	—	—	—	
Swing Easy! Part 2	Released: 1954; Label: Capitol Records	—	—	—	
Songs For Young Lovers (Part 1)	Released: 1954; Label: Capitol Records	—	—	—	
Songs For Young Lovers (Part 2)	Released: 1954; Label: Capitol Records	—	—	—	
Sinatra Sings Rodgers and Hart	Released: 1954; Label: Columbia	—	—	—	
Nancy	Released: January 1, 1955; Label: Columbia	—	—	—	
Session with Sinatra	Released: 1955; Label: Capitol Records	—	—	—	
The Voice	Released: 1955; Label: Columbia	—	—	—	
The Voice - Vol. 2	Released: 1955; Label: Columbia	—	—	—	
The Voice - Vol. 3	Released: 1955; Label: Columbia	—	—	—	
In the Wee Small Hours (Parts 1 & 2)	Released: 1955; Label: Capitol Records	—	—	—	
In the Wee Small Hours (Parts 3 & 4)	Released: 1955; Label: Capitol Records	—	—	—	
In the Wee Small Hours (Parts 1)	Released: 1955; Label: Capitol Records	—	—	—	
In the Wee Small Hours (Parts 2)	Released: 1955; Label: Capitol Records	—	—	—	
In the Wee Small Hours (Parts 3)	Released: 1955; Label: Capitol Records	—	—	—	
In the Wee Small Hours (Parts 4)	Released: 1955; Label: Capitol Records	—	—	—	
Sings Songs from His Warner Bros. Picture "Young at Heart"	Released: 1955; Label: Capitol Records	—	—	—	
Melody of Love (w/ Ray Anthony)	Released: 1955; Label: Capitol Records	—	—	—	
Frankie, Vol. 1	Released: 1955; Label: Columbia	—	—	—	
Frankie, Vol. 2	Released: 1955; Label: Columbia	—	—	—	
Frankie, Vol. 3	Released: 1955; Label: Columbia	—	—	—	
Close to You (Parts 1)	Released: 1956; Label: Capitol Records	—	—	—	
Close to You (Parts 2)	Released: 1956; Label: Capitol Records	—	—	—	
Close to You (Parts 3)	Released: 1956; Label: Capitol Records	—	—	—	
Close to You (Parts 4)	Released: 1956; Label: Capitol Records	—	—	—	
Close to You (Parts 1 & 2)	Released: 1956; Label: Capitol Records	—	—	—	
Close to You (Parts 3 & 4)	Released: 1956; Label: Capitol Records	—	—	—	
Songs for Swingin' Lovers (Parts 1)	Released: 1956; Label: Capitol Records	—	—	—	
Songs for Swingin' Lovers (Parts 2)	Released: 1956; Label: Capitol Records	—	—	—	
Songs for Swingin' Lovers (Parts 3)	Released: 1956; Label: Capitol Records	—	—	—	
Songs for Swingin' Lovers (Parts 4)	Released: 1956; Label: Capitol Records	—	—	—	
Songs for Swingin' Lovers (Parts 1 & 2)	Released: 1956; Label: Capitol Records	—	—	—	
Songs for Swingin' Lovers (Parts 3 & 4)	Released: 1956; Label: Capitol Records	—	—	—	
Hey! Jealous Lover	Released: 1956; Label: Capitol Records	—	—	—	
Producers' Showcase Presents: Our Town by Thornton Wilder	Released: 1956; Label: Capitol Records	—	—	—	
3 Coins in the Fountain	Released: 1956; Label: Capitol Records	—	—	—	
The Nearness of You	Released: 1956; Label: Columbia	—	—	—	
That Old Feeling	Released: 1956; Label: Columbia	—	—	—	
A Fellow Needs a Girl	Released: 1956; Label: Columbia	—	—	—	
A Swingin' Affair! (Part 1)	Released: 1957; Label: Capitol Records	—	—	—	
A Swingin' Affair! (Part 2)	Released: 1957; Label: Capitol Records	—	—	—	
A Swingin' Affair! (Part 3)	Released: 1957; Label: Capitol Records	—	—	—	
A Swingin' Affair! (Part 4)	Released: 1957; Label: Capitol Records	—	—	—	
Adventures of the Heart	Released: 1957; Label: Columbia	—	—	—	
Adventures of the Heart, Part 2	Released: 1957; Label: Columbia	—	—	—	
Christmas Dreaming - Vol. I	Released: 1957; Label: Columbia	—	—	—	
Christmas Dreaming - Vol. II	Released: 1957; Label: Columbia	—	—	—	
A Jolly Christmas from Frank Sinatra (Part 1)	Released: 1957; Label: Capitol Records	—	—	—	
A Jolly Christmas from Frank Sinatra (Part 2)	Released: 1957; Label: Capitol Records	—	—	—	
A Jolly Christmas from Frank Sinatra (Part 3)	Released: 1957; Label: Capitol Records	—	—	—	
The Birth of the Blues	Released: 1957; Label: Columbia	—	—	—	
Frank Sinatra	Released: 1957; Label: Columbia	—	—	—	
Where are You? (Part 1)	Released: 1957; Label: Capitol Records	—	—	—	
Where are You? (Part 2)	Released: 1957; Label: Capitol Records	—	—	—	
Where are You? (Part 3)	Released: 1957; Label: Capitol Records	—	—	—	
Where are You? (Part 4)	Released: 1957; Label: Capitol Records	—	—	—	
Where are You? (1&2)	Released: 1957; Label: Capitol Records	—	—	—	
Come Fly with Me (Part 1)	Released: 1958; Label: Capitol Records	—	—	—	
Come Fly with Me (Part 2)	Released: 1958; Label: Capitol Records	—	—	—	
Come Fly with Me (Part 3)	Released: 1958; Label: Capitol Records	—	—	—	
Come Fly with Me (Part 4)	Released: 1958; Label: Capitol Records	—	—	—	
The Lady is a Tramp	Released: 1958; Label: Capitol Records	—	—	—	
Frank Sinatra (B-2614)	Released: 1958; Label: Columbia	—	—	—	
Sings for Only the Lonely	Released: 1958; Label: Capitol Records	—	—	—	
This is Sinatra - Volume Two (Part 1)	Released: 1958; Label: Capitol Records	—	—	—	
This is Sinatra - Volume Two (Part 2)	Released: 1958; Label: Capitol Records	—	—	—	
This is Sinatra - Volume Two (Part 3)	Released: 1958; Label: Capitol Records	—	—	—	
This is Sinatra - Volume Two (Part 4)	Released: 1958; Label: Capitol Records	—	—	—	
Frank Sinatra (B-2638)	Released: 1958; Label: Columbia	—	—	—	
Frank Sinatra with Harry James & Pearl Bailey	Released: 1958; Label: Columbia	—	—	—	
Frank Sinatra (B-2564)	Released: 1958; Label: Columbia	—	—	—	
I Could Write a Book (B-2564)	Released: 1958; Label: Columbia	—	—	—	
High Hopes	Released: 1959; Label: Capitol Records	—	—	—	
Come Dance with Me (Part 1)	Released: 1959; Label: Capitol Records	—	—	—	
Come Dance with Me (Part 2)	Released: 1959; Label: Capitol Records	—	—	—	
Come Dance with Me (Part 3)	Released: 1959; Label: Capitol Records	—	—	—	
Talk to Me	Released: 1959; Label: Capitol Records	—	—	—	
French Foreign Legion	Released: 1959; Label: Capitol Records	—	—	—	
Close to You	Released: 1959; Label: Columbia	—	—	—	
No One Cares (Part 1)	Released: 1959; Label: Capitol Records	—	—	—	
No One Cares (Part 2)	Released: 1959; Label: Capitol Records	—	—	—	
No One Cares (Part 3)	Released: 1959; Label: Capitol Records	—	—	—	
Nice 'n Easy (Part 1)	Released: 1960; Label: Capitol Records	—	—	—	
Nice 'n Easy (Part 2)	Released: 1960; Label: Capitol Records	—	—	—	
Nice 'n Easy (Part 3)	Released: 1960; Label: Capitol Records	—	—	—	
Frank Sinatra	Released: 1960; Label: RCA Victor	—	—	—	
Sinatra's Swingin' Session!!! (Part 1)	Released: 1961; Label: Capitol Records	—	—	—	
Sinatra's Swingin' Session!!! (Part 2)	Released: 1961; Label: Capitol Records	—	—	—	
Sinatra's Swingin' Session!!! (Part 3)	Released: 1961; Label: Capitol Records	—	—	—	
Frank Sinatra	Released: 1961; Label: Capitol Records	—	—	—	
Come Swing With Me! Part 1	Released: 1961; Label: Capitol Records	—	—	—	
Come Swing With Me! Part 2	Released: 1961; Label: Capitol Records	—	—	—	
Come Swing With Me! Part 3	Released: 1961; Label: Capitol Records	—	—	—	
Sinatra at the Sands (w/ Count Basie)	Released: 1966; Label: Reprise Records	—	—	—	
Francis Albert Sinatra Antonio Carlos Jobim (w/ Antonio Carlos Jobim)	Released: 1967; Label: Reprise Records	—	—	—	
Sinatra Swings	Released: 1967; Label: Reprise Records	—	—	—	
Frank Sinatra's Giant Hits	Released: 1967; Label: Reprise Records	—	—	—	
For My Dad (w/ Nancy Sinatra)	Released: 1998; Label: DCC Compact Classics	—	—	—	

=== Compilation albums ===
Title	Album details	Peak chart positions		Certifications
Title	Album details	US	UK	Certifications
Fabulous Frankie (w/ Tommy Dorsey)	Released: 1954; Label: RCA Victor; LP version	—	—	
I've Got a Crush on You	Released: 1954; Label: Columbia	—	—	
Get Happy!	Released: 1954; Label: Columbia	—	—	
Swing Easy! and Songs for Young Lovers	Released: 1955; Label: Capitol Records	—	—	
Frankie	Released: 1955; Label: Columbia	—	—	
The Voice	Released: 1955; Label: Columbia	—	—	
This Is Sinatra!	Released: November 1956; Label: Capitol	8	1	RIAA: Gold
That Old Feeling	Released: 1956; Label: Columbia	—	—	
Adventures of the Heart	Released: 1957; Label: Columbia	—	—	
This Is Sinatra Volume 2	Released: March 1958; Label: Capitol	8	3	
The Frank Sinatra Story	Released: 1958; Label: Columbia; aka The Frank Sinatra Story in Music - double LP	12 (Note: 1 week)	—	
Put Your Dreams Away	Released: 1958; Label: Columbia	—	—	
Frankie and Tommy (w/ Tommy Dorsey)	Released: 1958; Label: RCA	—	—	
We 3 (w/ Tommy Dorsey and Axel Stordahl)	Released: 1958; Label: RCA	—	—	
Love is a Kick	Released: 1959; Label: Columbia	—	—	
The Broadway Kick	Released: 1959; Label: Columbia	—	—	
Come Back to Sorrento	Released: 1959; Label: Columbia	—	—	
Reflections	Released: 1959; Label: Columbia	—	—	
Look to Your Heart	Released: 1959; Label: Capitol	—	—	
All the Way	Released: March 1961; Label: Capitol	4	—	
When Your Lover Has Gone	Released: August 1961; Label: Encore	—	6	
Sinatra Sings of Love and Things	Released: July 1962; Label: Capitol	15	—	
The Great Years	Released: November 1962; Label: Capitol; 3×LP	—	—	
Twin Pack	Released: 1962; Label: Reprise Records	—	—	
Point of No Return/No One Cares	Released: 1962; Label: Capitol	—	—	
Tommy Dorsey and His Orchestra Featuring Frank Sinatra	Released: 1963; Label: Coronet Records, Spin-O-Rama	—	—	
Tell Her You Love Her	Released: 1963; Label: Capitol	129 (Note: 1 week)	—	
Have Yourself a Merry Little Christmas (w/ various artists)	Released: 1963; Label: Reprise Records	—	—	
Sings Rodgers and Hart	Released: 1963; Label: Capitol	—	—	
Sings the Select Johnny Mercer	Released: 1963; Label: Capitol	—	—	
The Great Hits of Frank Sinatra	Released: 1964; Label: Capitol	—	—	
This is Sinatra ...His Very Best	Released: 1964; Label: Capitol	—	—	
Sinatra '65: The Singer Today	Released: June 1965; Label: Reprise	9	—	
Sentimental Journey	Released: 1965; Label: Capitol	—	—	
Sings the Select Cole Porter	Released: 1965; Label: Capitol	—	—	
Where Are You?/No One Cares	Released: 1965; Label: Capitol	—	—	
All the Way/Sinatra's Swingin' Session!!!	Released: 1965; Label: Capitol	—	—	
Come Dance with Me!/Only the Lonely	Released: 1966; Label: Capitol	—	—	
Forever Frank	Released: October 1966; Label: Capitol	—	—	
Frank Sinatra's Greatest Hits - The Early Years	Released: 1966; Label: Columbia	—	—	
Frank Sinatra's Greatest Hits - The Early Years - Volume Two	Released: 1966; Label: Columbia	—	—	
The Movie Songs	Released: May 1967; Label: Capitol	195	—	
The Nearness of You	Released: 1967; Label: Capitol Records	—	—	
Songs for the Young at Heart	Released: 1967; Label: Capitol Records	—	—	
Just One of Those Things	Released: 1967; Label: Capitol Records	—	—	
Try a Little Tenderness	Released: 1967; Label: Capitol Records	—	—	
Romantic Songs from the Early Years	Released: 1967; Label: Columbia, Harmony	—	—	
Frank Sinatra's Greatest Hits	Released: August 1968; Label: Reprise	55	8	RIAA: 2× Platinum
The Frank Sinatra Deluxe Set	Released: 1968; Label: Capitol Records	—	—	
In Hollywood 1943-1949	Released: 1968; Label: Columbia	—	—	
Nevertheless I'm in Love with You	Released: 1968; Label: Capitol Records	—	—	
Someone to Watch Over Me	Released: 1968; Label: Harmony	—	—	
My Cole Porter	Released: 1969; Label: Capitol Records	—	—	
Close-Up	Released: 1969; Label: Capitol Records	—	—	
Frank Sinatra's Greatest!	Released: 1969; Label: Capitol Records, Starline	—	—	
Frank Sinatra	Released: 1969; Label: Harmony	—	—	
What is This Thing Called Love?/The Night We Called It a Day	Released: 1970; Label: Capitol Records	—	—	
Greatest Hits (The Early Years)	Released: 1971; Label: Harmony, Columbia Special Products	—	—	
My One and Only Love/Sentimental Journey	Released: 1971; Label: Capitol Records	—	—	
The Frank Sinatra Songbook, Vol. 1	Released: 1971; Label: Reprise	—	—	
Frank Sinatra's Greatest Hits, Vol. 2	Released: May 1972; Label: Reprise	88	6	RIAA: Platinum
I'm Gettin' Sentimental Over You (w/ Tommy Dorsey)	Released: 1972; Label: Pickwick, RCA Camden	—	—	
In The Beginning 1943 To 1951	Released: 1972; Label: Columbia	—	—	
This Love of Mine (w/ Tommy Dorsey)	Released: 1972; Label: RCA	—	—	
The Cole Porter Songbook	Released: 1972; Label: Capitol Records	—	—	
The Frank Sinatra Songbook, Vol. 2	Released: 1972; Label: Reprise	—	—	
Sinatra Special	Released: 1973; Label: Capitol Records	—	—	
I'll See You in My Dreams (w/ Tommy Dorsey)	Released: 1973; Label: RCA Camden	—	—	
Try a Little Tenderness/Nevertheless I'm in Love with You	Released: 1973; Label: Capitol Records	—	—	
Like Never Before	Released: 1973; Label: Longines Symphonette Society	—	—	
The Great Ones	Released: 1973; Label: Capitol Records	—	—	
Round #1	Released: 1974; Label: Capitol Records	170 (Note: 3 weeks, January 1975)	—	
What'll I Do? (w/ Tommy Dorsey)	Released: 1974; Label: RCA	—	—	
His Twenty Greatest Hits	Released: 1974; Label: Capitol Records	—	—	
One More for the Road	Released: 1974; Label: Capitol Records	—	—	
Frank Sinatra	Released: 1975; Label: Cameron	—	—	
Best of Ol' Blue Eyes	Released: May 23, 1975 (UK); Label: Reprise	—	—	BPI: Silver
The Young Harry James (also w/ Helen Forrest)	Released: 1976; Label: Jazz Archives	—	—	
Portrait of Sinatra – Forty Songs from the Life of a Man	Released: 1977 (UK); Label: Reprise Records	—	1	BPI: Platinum
Merry Christmas to You! (w/ Bing Crosby)	Released: 1977; Label: Collector's Gold	—	—	
Happy Holiday with Frank & Bing (w/ The Midnight Strings)	Released: 1977; Label: Collector's Gold	—	—	
Twenty Golden Greats	Released: 1978 (UK); Label: Capitol Records	—	—	BPI: Gold
Higher and Higher - The Sinatra Show (Original Motion Picture Soundtrack) (w/ various artists)	Released: 1980; Label: Hollywood Soundstage	—	—	
Step Lively (Original Motion Picture Soundtrack) (w/ various artists)	Released: 1980; Label: Hollywood Soundstage	—	—	
Anything Goes/Panama Hattie (soundtracks - w/ Ethel Merman)	Released: 1981; Label: Sandy Hook Records	—	—	
20 Classic Tracks	Released: 1981 (UK); Label: Music For Pleasure, Capitol Records, EMI	—	—	BPI: Silver (1991 version); BPI: Gold (1997 version - "20 of the Best"); BPI: Gold (1998 version)
The Dorsey/Sinatra Sessions Vol. 1 (February 1, 1940 - July 17, 1940) (w/ Tommy Dorsey)	Released: 1982; Label: RCA	—	—	
The Dorsey/Sinatra Sessions Vol. 2 (July 17, 1940 - May 28, 1941) (w/ Tommy Dorsey)	Released: 1982; Label: RCA	—	—	
The Dorsey/Sinatra Sessions Vol. 3 (June 27, 1941 - July 2, 1942) (w/ Tommy Dorsey)	Released: 1982; Label: RCA	—	—	
Royalty "Collector's Series" (w/ Lena Horne)	Released: 1982; Label: Intermedia	—	—	
I Found a New Love"	Released: 1982; Label: Aura Records, Stack-O-Hits	—	—	
New York New York (His Greatest Hits)	Released: 1983 (UK); Label: Reprise Records, Warner Bros	—	—	BPI: Platinum
All-Time Classics	Released: 1983; Label: Capitol Records	—	—	
Greatest Hits Vol. I • Vol. II	Released: 1983; Label: Reprise Records	—	—	
Timeless	Released: 1983; Label: Capitol Records	—	—	
Sinatra!	Released: 1983; Label: Capitol Records	—	—	
Frank Sinatra's Gold	Released: 1983; Label: Capitol Records	—	—	
Ship Ahoy/Las Vegas Nights (soundtracks - w/ Eleanor Powell, Red Skelton, Tommy Dorsey, Bert Lahr, and Virginia O'Brien)	Released: 1983; Label: Hollywood Soundstage	—	—	
This Love of Mine	Released: 1984; Label: Capitol Records	—	—	
Sings & Swings	Released: 1985; Label: Capitol Records	—	—	
Favorites	Released: 1985; Label: Capitol Records	—	—	
Around the World	Released: 1985; Label: Capitol Records	—	—	
Young Frank Sinatra	Released: 1985; Label: Golden Circle, Inc.	—	—	
The Very Thought of You	Released: 1985; Label: Golden Circle, Inc.	—	—	
The Early Years	Released: 1985; Label: Golden Circle, Inc.	—	—	
Classic Performances	Released: 1986; Label: Capitol Records	—	—	
The Frank Sinatra Collection	Released: 1986 (UK); Label: EMI	—	—	BPI: Silver
String Along	Released: 1987; Label: Object Enterprises	—	—	
Sinatra	Released: 1987; Label: Capitol Records	—	—	
Hello Young Lovers	Released: 1987; Label: Columbia	—	—	
Sentimental Dorsey with Frank Sinatra, Vocalist (w/ Tommy Dorsey)	Released: 1987; Label: Pair Records, RCA Special Products	—	—	
Sinatra Rarities: The CBS Years	Released: 1988; Label: CBS	—	—	
Show Stoppers	Released: 1988; Label: BCI Music	—	—	
All Time Greatest Hits, Vol. 1 (w/ Tommy Dorsey)	Released: 1988; Label: RCA	—	—	
All Time Greatest Hits, Vol. 2 (w/ Tommy Dorsey)	Released: 1988; Label: RCA	—	—	
Screen Sinatra	Released: 1988; Label: Capitol Records	—	—	
It's Christmas Time (w/ Bing Crosby and Nat King Cole)	Released: 1989; Label: LaserLight Digital	—	—	
Tommy Dorsey / Frank Sinatra - All Time Greatest Hits, Vol. 3 (w/ Tommy Dorsey)	Released: 1989; Label: RCA	—	—	
The Capitol Collector Series	Released: 1989; Label: Capitol Records	—	—	RIAA: Gold
The Capitol Years (3×CD)	Released: 1990; Label: Capitol Records	126 (Note: 11 weeks)	—	RIAA: Gold
All Time Greatest Hits, Vol. 4 (And The Historic Stordahl Session) (w/ Tommy Dorsey)	Released: 1990; Label: RCA	—	—	
My Heart Tells Me (Vol 3)	Released: 1990; Label: Creative Sounds, Spot Light	—	—	
Sinatra Reprise: The Very Good Years	Released: 1991; Label: Reprise Records	138 (Note: 27 weeks)	—	RIAA: 2× Platinum
The Best of the Capitol Years	Released: November 3, 1992; Label: Capitol Records	—	—	RIAA: Gold
At the Movies	Released: 1992; Label: Capitol Records	—	—	
Sinatra: Soundtrack To The CBS Mini-Series	Released: 1992; Label: Reprise Records	—	—	
Young Frank Sinatra: In the Blue of Evening	Released: 1992; Label: Natasha Imports	—	—	
Stardust (w/ Tommy Dorsey)	Released: 1992; Label: RCA, Bluebird	—	—	
The Sinatra Saga	Released: 1992; Label: Bravura	—	—	
A Good Man is Hard to Find Vol 1	Released: 1993; Label: Spot Light, Pilz Entertainment, Inc.	—	—	
Sings the Songs of Sammy Cahn and Jule Styne	Released: 1993; Label: Vintage Jazz Classics	—	—	
Frank Sinatra Holiday Classics	Released: 1993; Label: Eclipse Music Group, Inc.	—	—	
The Columbia Years 1943-1952 Vol. 03	Released: 1993; Label: Columbia, Legacy	—	—	
The Columbia Years 1943-1952 Vol. 6	Released: 1993; Label: Columbia, Legacy	—	—	
The Columbia Years 1943-1952 Vol. 7	Released: 1993; Label: Columbia, Legacy	—	—	
The Columbia Years 1943-1952 Vol. 8	Released: 1993; Label: Columbia, Legacy	—	—	
The Columbia Years 1943-1952 Vol. 10	Released: 1993; Label: Columbia, Legacy	—	—	
The Columbia Years 1943-1952 Vol. 11	Released: 1993; Label: Columbia, Legacy	—	—	
The Columbia Years 1943-1952 Vol. 12	Released: 1993; Label: Columbia, Legacy	—	—	
Christmas With Bing & Frank (w/ Bing Crosby)	Released: 1993; Label: Eclipse Music Group, Inc.	—	—	
The Formative Years	Released: 1993; Label: Avid Records	—	—	
The Sinatra Christmas Album	Released: November 1994; Label: Reprise	—	—	
The Essence of Frank Sinatra	Released: 1994; Label: Columbia, Legacy	—	—	
That Christmas Feeling (w/ Bing Crosby)	Released: 1994; Label: Regency Music	—	—	
My Shining Hour	Released: 1994; Label: Drive Archive	—	—	
I'll Be Seeing You (w/ Tommy Dorsey)	Released: 1994; Label: RCA	—	—	
There'll Be Some Changes Made (The Rarities: 1950-1951)	Released: 1994; Label: Voice	—	—	
All or Nothing at All (w/ Harry James & His Orchestra)	Released: 1995; Label: Hindsight Records	—	—	
The Complete Recordings Nineteen Thirty-Nine (w/ Harry James & His Orchestra)	Released: 1995; Label: Columbia, Legacy	—	—	
Sings the Select Rodgers & Hart	Released: 1995; Label: Capitol Records	—	—	
Sings the Select Johnny Mercer	Released: 1995; Label: Capitol Records	—	—	
I've Got a Crush on You	Released: 1995; Label: Legacy, Columbia	—	—	
16 Most Requested Songs	Released: May 1995; Label: Legacy/Columbia	—	—	RIAA: Platinum
Christmas Through the Years	Released: October 1995; Label: LaserLight	—	—	
Sinatra 80th: All the Best	Released: 1995; Label: Capitol Records	66 (Note: 5 weeks)	—	BPI: Silver
Everything Happens to Me	Released: February 6, 1996; Label: Reprise	—	—	
Frank Sinatra: The Collection	Released: 1996; Label: T.K.O Licensing Ltd.	—	—	
Sings the Select Sammy Cahn	Released: 1996; Label: Capitol Records	—	—	
Sinatra Sings Rodgers and Hammerstein	Released: 1996; Label: Columbia, Legacy	—	—	
Christmas Sing with Frank And Bing (w/ Bing Crosby)	Released: 1996; Label: LaserLight	—	—	
Frank Sinatra & Tommy Dorsey - Greatest Hits (w/ Tommy Dorsey)	Released: 1996; Label: RCA Victor, BMG Classics	—	—	
The Very Best of Frank Sinatra	Released: 1997; Label: Reprise Records; 2×CD	124 (Note: 2 week)	—	RIAA: Gold
My Way: The Best of Frank Sinatra	Released: 1997 (Europe); Label: Reprise Records	—	—	BPI: 5× Platinum
Frank Sinatra Sings His Greatest Hits	Released: 1997; Label: Columbia, Legacy	—	—	
Portrait of Sinatra (Columbia Classics)	Released: 1997; Label: Columbia, Legacy	—	—	
The Legendary Sides (w/ Tommy Dorsey)	Released: Nov 18, 1997; Label: BMG Special Products	—	—	
Gold	Released: 1997; Label: EMI-Capitol Music Special Markets	—	—	
Love Songs (w/ Tommy Dorsey)	Released: 1997; Label: RCA Victor, BMG Music	—	—	
Frank Sinatra's Perfect Ten	Released: 1997; Label: EMI Special Markets	—	—	
The Popular Sinatra Vol. 1 (w/ Tommy Dorsey)	Released: 1998; Label: RCA Victor, BMG Classics	—	—	
The Popular Sinatra, Vol. 2 (w/ Tommy Dorsey)	Released: 1998; Label: RCA Victor, BMG Classics	—	—	
It's Christmas Time (w/ Bing Crosby and Louis Armstrong)	Released: 1998; Label: LaserLight	—	—	
Lucky Numbers	Released: 1998; Label: Reprise Records	—	—	
Gems from the Early Years (w/ Harry James)	Released: 1998; Label: Reader's Digest Music	—	—	
Frank Sinatra Vol. II	Released: 1998; Label: United Audio Entertainment	—	—	
Beginnings	Released: 1998; Label: BCI Music	—	—	
The Early Years	Released: 1998; Label: BCI Music	—	—	
Christmas Cabaret (w/ various artists)	Released: 1999; Label: KRB Music Companies	—	—	
The Fabulous Frank Sinatra & Tommy Dorsey (w/ Tommy Dorsey)	Released: 1999; Label: RCA Victor	—	—	
Classic Sinatra - His Great Performances 1953-1960	Released: 2000; Label: Capitol Records	—	—	RIAA: 2× Platinum; BPI: Gold
Sentimental Romance (w/ Tommy Dorsey)	Released: 2000; Label: Green Hill, BMG Special Products	—	—	
Falling in Love with Frank Sinatra & Tommy Dorsey	Released: Jan 11, 2000; Label: BMG Special Products	—	—	
A Sinatra Christmas	Released: 2000; Label: Sugo Music, Sony Music Special Products	—	—	
Super Hits	Released: 2000; Label: Columbia, Legacy	—	—	
Ol' Blue Eyes	Released: 2000; Label: Sugo Music And Design	—	—	
Love Songs	Released: 2001; Label: Columbia, Legacy	—	—	
The Heart of the Matter (Frank Sinatra Sings About Love)	Released: 2001; Label: Hear Music, EMI-Capitol Music Special Markets	—	—	
A Fine Romance - The Love Songs of Frank Sinatra	Released: 2002; Label: Reprise Records	—	—	BPI: Gold
Greatest Love Songs	Released: Jan 15, 2002; Label: Reprise Records, Warner Strategic Marketing	32 (Note: 16 week)	—	RIAA: Gold
Classic Duets	Released: 2002; Label: Capitol Records	—	—	
On the Swingin' Side of the Street	Released: 2002; Label: Capitol Records, Somerset Entertainment	—	—	
Voice of the Century (w/ Tommy Dorsey)	Released: 2002; Label: Bluebird	—	—	
A Christmas Collection (Collection One) (w/ Bing Crosby, Ella Fitzgerald, and The Andrews Sisters)	Released: 2002; Label: Going For A Song	—	—	
Classic Masters	Released: 2003; Label: Capitol Records	—	—	
Sinatra Sings Cole Porter	Released: 2003; Label: Columbia, Legacy	—	—	
Sinatra Sings Gershwin	Released: 2003; Label: Columbia, Legacy	—	—	
The Essential Frank Sinatra: The Columbia Years	Released: 2003; Label: Columbia, Legacy	—	—	
Classics & Standards	Released: 2003; Label: Sony Music Custom Marketing Group	—	—	
Classics	Released: 2003; Label: EMI-Capitol Special Markets, GSC Music, EDI	—	—	
God's Country	Released: 2003; Label: Sony Music Custom Marketing Group	—	—	
The Song is You	Released: 2003; Label: Sony Music Custom Marketing Group	—	—	
Platinum & Gold Collection (w/ Tommy Dorsey)	Released: Aug 19, 2003; Label: Bluebird, BMG Heritage	—	—	
The Platinum Collection	Released: 2004; Label: EMI, Capitol Records	—	—	BPI: Silver
Frank Sinatra Christmas Collection	Released: October 26, 2004; Label: Reprise	—	—	BPI: Silver
The Voice	Released: 2004; Label: BCI Music	—	—	
Christmas Through the Years (w/ Bing Crosby and Elvis Presley)	Released: 2004; Label: LaserLight	—	—	
The Sinatra Treasures	Released: 2004; Label: Bristol Productions Limited Partnership	—	—	
Young Blue Eyes - Birth Of The Crooner (w/ Tommy Dorsey)	Released: 2004; Label: Bluebird, Arista Associated Labels	—	—	
American Music Legends	Released: 2004; Label: Cracker Barrel Old Country Store, Rhino Special Products	—	—	
Taking a Chance on Love	Released: 2004; Label: Capitol Records	—	—	
All of Me (15 Favorites)	Released: 2004; Label: Village Square Music, Sony Music Custom Marketing Group	—	—	
Night and Day	Released: 2004; Label: Synergy Entertainment	—	—	
The Essential Frank Sinatra with the Tommy Dorsey Orchestra (w/ Tommy Dorsey)	Released: 2005; Label: Bluebird, Legacy	—	—	
Fly Me to the Moon	Released: 2005; Label: Rhino Special Products, Hear Music	—	—	
The Great American Songbook	Released: 2005; Label: Columbia, Legacy	—	—	
Christmas with Frank Sinatra & Bing Crosby (w/ Bing Crosby)	Released: 2005; Label: St. Clair Entertainment Group, Inc.	—	—	
Caroling with the Crooners (w/ Bing Crosby and Nat King Cole)	Released: 2006; Label: KRB Music Companies	—	—	
The Collection	Released: 2006 (UK & Europe); Label: The Red Box	—	—	BPI: Silver
Bing Crosby, Frank Sinatra, Perry Como (w/ Bing Crosby and Perry Como)	Released: 2007; Label: Direct Source Special Products Inc.	—	—	
Romance: Songs From the Heart	Released: 2007; Label: Capitol Records	—	—	
Frank Sinatra Sings the Cole Porter Songbook	Released: 2007; Label: Acrobat Music	—	—	
Seasons Greetings from Frank Sinatra & Bing Crosby (w/ Bing Crosby)	Released: 2007; Label: EMI Music Special Markets	—	—	
Nothing but the Best	Released: May 13, 2008; Label: Reprise Records; came in single-CD, Christmas double-CD, and CD/DVD versions	2	10	RIAA: Gold; BPI: Gold; RMNZ: Gold
Playlist: The Very Best of Frank Sinatra	Released: 2008; Label: Columbia, Legacy	—	—	
The Voice	Released: 2008 (UK, Europe & US); Label: Weton-Wesgram	—	—	
Classic Sinatra: His Greatest Hits - Exclusiva NAC	Released: 2008 (USA & Canada); Label: Swing Hat	—	—	
Love Songs	Released: 2008; Label: Sony BMG Music Entertainment	—	—	
Christmas Memories	Released: 2008 (USA & Canada); Label: Platinum Legends	—	—	
Christmas with Sinatra & Friends	Released: October 6, 2009; Label: Concord	—	—	
From the Heart	Released: 2009; Label: Sony Music Custom Marketing Group	—	—	
Classics & Standards/I've Got a Crush on You/Songs from the Movies	Released: 2009; Label: Columbia, RCA Victor	—	—	
Sinatra: As Selected By Steve Wynn Volume 1	Released: 2009; Label: Reprise Records	—	—	
Classic Sinatra II	Released: 2009; Label: Capitol Records	—	—	
Seduction: Sinatra Sings of Love	Released: 2009; Label: Reprise Records	—	—	
Timeless Hits	Released: Jan 25, 2010; Label: Timeless Media Group	—	—	
Sinatra Jobim (The Complete Reprise Recordings) (w/ Antonio Carlos Jobim)	Released: May 4, 2010; Label: Concord Records	—	—	
The Complete Reprise Studio Recordings (w/ Count Basie)	Released: Sep 6, 2011 (USA & Canada); Label: Concord Records	—	—	
Christmas	Released: 2013; Label: Capitol Records, UMe	—	—	
Icon	Released: Oct 8, 2013; Label: Capitol Records	—	—	
Best of Duets	Released: 2013; Label: Capitol Records, Signature Sinatra	—	—	
The Christmas Collection	Released: 2013; Label: Crimson Productions	—	—	
With Love	Released: 2014; Label: UMe, Capitol Records	—	—	
The Classic Christmas Album	Released: 2014; Label: Columbia, Legacy	—	—	
Ultimate Sinatra	Released: Apr 21, 2015; Label: Capitol Records, UMe, Signature Sinatra; came in single, double, and 4-CD versions	—	—	BPI: Platinum
Ultimate Christmas	Released: October 6, 2017; Label: Capitol	9	33	
Baby Blue Eyes... May The First Voice You Hear Be Mine	Released: Apr 6, 2018; Label: Capitol	—	—	
Sinatra Sings Alan & Marilyn Bergman	Released: Oct 11, 2019; Label: Capitol Records, UMe, Signature Sinatra	—	—	
Christmas with Frank Sinatra	Released: Oct 7, 2022; Label: Columbia, Legacy	—	—	
Frank Sinatra Platinum (70th Capitol Collection)	Released: 2023; Label: Capitol	—	—	
The Giants of Jazz (w/ Duke Ellington and Count Basie)	Released: 2025; Label: Capitol, The Frank Sinatra Collection, UMe	—	—	
Rat Pack albums
Eee-O 11: The Best of the Rat Pack	Released: 2001; Label: Capitol Records	—	—	
Christmas with the Rat Pack	Released: October 22, 2002; Label: Capitol Records	—	—	
The Rat Pack (The Big Three)	Released: 2008; Label: Big3	—	—	
The Very Best of the Rat Pack	Released: 2010; Label: Reprise Records	—	—	
"—" denotes a recording that did not chart or was not released in that territory.

=== Live albums ===
Title	Album details	Peak chart positions		Certifications
Title	Album details	US	UK	Certifications
Sinatra at the Sands (with Count Basie)	Released: July 1966; Label: Reprise	9	7	RIAA: Gold; BPI: Silver
The Main Event – Live	Released: October 1974; Label: Reprise	37	30	RIAA: Gold; BPI: Silver
Post-1974 albums
The Paramount Years	Released: 1975; Label: Chairman Records	—	—	
Rare Recordings 1935 - 1970	Released: 1980; Label: Sandy Hook Records	—	—	
Now is the Hour	Released: 1982; Label: Intermedia, Soundwave Inc.	—	—	
The Tommy Dorsey / Frank Sinatra Radio Years and The Historic Stordahl Session (w/Tommy Dorsey - the Stordahl session wasn't live)	Released: September 1983; Label: RCA	—	—	
One Night Stand with Frank Sinatra Plus Connie Boswell	Released: 1983; Label: Joyce	—	—	
A Complete 1 Hour Band Remote Broadcast from "The Meadowbrook" (w/Tommy Dorsey, Jo Stafford, and The Pied Pipers)	Released: 1987; Label: Radiola	—	—	
Songs by Sinatra Starring Jimmy Durante: Volume One (w/Jimmy Durante and The Pied Pipers)	Released: 1988; Label: P. J. International Records	—	—	
The Radio Years	Released: 1988; Label: K-Tel	—	—	
To Be Perfectly Frank	Released: 1990; Label: Sandy Hook Records	—	—	
The Unheard Frank Sinatra: Volume 1 - "As Time Goes By"	Released: 1990; Label: Vintage Jazz Classics	—	—	
"The House I Live In", Early Encores: 1943-'46. Volume 2	Released: 1990; Label: Vintage Jazz Classics	—	—	
The Unheard Frank Sinatra Volume 3 - Long Ago and Far Away (Radio Rarities 1943-1949)	Released: 1991; Label: Vintage Jazz Classics	—	—	
The Unheard Frank Sinatra: Volume 4 - I'll Be Seeing You	Released: 1993; Label: Vintage Jazz Classics	—	—	
The Radio Years	Released: 1993; Label: Impressionable Records	—	—	
The Live Duets 1943-1957	Released: 1994; Label: Voice	—	—	
1946 Old Gold Shows	Released: 1994; Label: Jazz Hour Compact Classics	—	—	
Sinatra & Sextet: Live in Paris (recorded 1962)	Released: March 22, 1994; Label: Reprise Records	—	—	
Sinatra 80th: Live in Concert	Released: November 14, 1995; Label: Capitol Records	61	—	RIAA: Gold
Live! Seattle Washington Concert (Sinatra '57 in Concert)	Released: 1995; Label: Jazz Hour Compact Classics	—	—	
Frank Sinatra with the Red Norvo Quintet: Live in Australia, 1959	Released: April 8, 1997; Label: Blue Note	—	—	
Ella "A Swingin' Summit" with Frank & "The Count" (w/Ella Fitzgerald and Count Basie)	Released: 1997; Label: Pinnacle	—	—	
The Golden Days of Radio	Released: 1998; Label: K-Tel	—	—	
It's All So New! (w/Tommy Dorsey)	Released: 1999; Label: Buddha Records	—	—	
Learn to Croon (w/Tommy Dorsey)	Released: 1999; Label: Buddha Records	—	—	
Live from Las Vegas	Released: April 26, 2005; Label: Capitol Records	199	—	
On The Radio: Lucky Strike "Lite-Up Time" Shows 1949-50	Released: 2008; Label: Concord Records	—	—	
Live at the Meadowlands	Released: May 5, 2009; Label: Concord Records	—	—	
Selections from Sinatra Dance with Me	Released: 2010; Label: Reprise Records	—	—	
Best of Vegas	Released: February 8, 2011; Label: Reprise Records	—	—	
The 'Retirement' Concert	Released: November 20, 2015; Label: UMe	—	—	
Lost and Found – The Radio Years	Released: 2015; Label: Columbia, Legacy	—	—	
At The Hollywood Bowl 1943-1948 (Highlights)	Released: 2025; Label: Sing Records	—	—	
Christmas on the Air	Released: November 25, 2025; Label: Sing Records	—	—	
Rat Pack albums
Frank Sinatra, Dean Martin, Sammy Davis Jr. at Villa Venice, Chicago - Live 1962	Released: 1993; Label: Jazz Hour Compact Classics	—	—	
The Rat Pack Live at the Sands	Released: 2001; Label: Capitol Records	—	—	
Ratpack: From Vegas to St. Louis	Released: 2002	—	—	
The Ultimate Rat Pack Collection: Live & Swingin'	Released: 2003	—	—	
"—" denotes a recording that did not chart or was not released in that territory.

=== Albums conducted by Sinatra ===
Title	Album details
Frank Sinatra Conducts the Music of Alec Wilder	Released: 1946; Label: Columbia Records
Frank Sinatra Conducts Tone Poems of Color	Released: 1956; Label: Capitol
The Man I Love (sung by Peggy Lee, arranged by Nelson Riddle)	Released: March 1957; Label: Capitol
Sleep Warm (sung by Dean Martin, arranged by Pete King)	Released: March 2, 1959; Label: Capitol
Frank Sinatra Conducts Music from Pictures and Plays (arranged by Harry Sukman)	Released: 1962; Label: Reprise
Syms by Sinatra (sung by Sylvia Syms, arranged by Don Costa)	Released: 1982; Label: Reprise
Whats New? (with trumpeter Charles Turner)	Released: 1983

== Box sets and collections ==
=== RCA Records ===
- 1944 Starmaker (Sinatra/Dorsey)
- 1954 Fabulous Frankie (Sinatra/Dorsey) - the double EP box set
- 1982 Frank and a Few Friends [6×LP box set] (w/ Tommy Dorsey)
- 1994 The Song Is You (Sinatra/Dorsey) [5-Disc box set]
- 1998 The Popular Sinatra Vols. 1-3 (Sinatra/Dorsey) [3-Disc box set]

=== Columbia Records ===
- 1966 The Essential Frank Sinatra [3-LP box set]
- 1986 The Voice: The Columbia Years (1943–1952) [6-LP box set]
- 1993 The Columbia Years 1943-1952: The Complete Recordings [12-Disc box set]
- 1994 The Columbia Years 1943–1952: The V-Discs [2-Disc box set]
- 1994 The Best of the Columbia Years: 1943-1952 [4-Disc box set]
- 2000 Frank Sinatra (aka The Collection) [3-Disc box set - Sinatra Sings His Greatest Hits, Swing and Dance with Frank Sinatra, and Sinatra Sings Rodgers And Hammerstein]
- 2003 The Real Complete Columbia Years V-Discs [3-Disc - Spain]
- 2007 A Voice in Time: 1939-1952 [4-Disc box set]
- 2009 The Music of Frank Sinatra [3-Disc box set]
- 2015 A Voice on Air 1935-1955 [4-Disc box set]

=== Capitol Records ===
- 1956 High Society - soundtrack; w/ Bing Crosby and Grace Kelly (2×EP box set)
- 1957 Pal Joey - soundtrack; w/ Rita Hayworth and Kim Novak (4×EP box set)
- 1968 The Frank Sinatra Deluxe Set [6-LP box set]
- 1968 The Sinatra Touch [6-LP box set]
- 1983 Sinatra [16-LP box set]
- 1992 Concepts [16-Disc box set]
- 1996 The Complete Capitol Singles Collection [4-Disc box set]
- 1998 The Capitol Years [21-Disc box set, UK]
- 1998 Duets and Duets II [3-CD box set]
- 1998 36 All-Time Favorites [3-CD box set]
- 2004 Capitol Records Concept Albums [14-CD box set]
- 2008 Sinatra at the Movies (Europe & Canada)
- 2011 Sinatra: Best of the Best (2×CD box set; BPI: Gold)
- 2013 5 Classic Swingin' Albums (5×CD box set)

=== Reprise Records ===
- 1975 Sinatra: The Reprise Years (UK 4×LP box set, BPI: Silver)
- 1979 Sinatra–Jobim Sessions
- 1990 The Reprise Collection [4-CD box set] (No. 98, 10 weeks U.S. Billboard)
- 1995 The Complete Reprise Studio Recordings [20-Disc box set]
- 2002 Frank Sinatra in Hollywood 1940-1964 [6-Disc box set]
- 2006 Vegas (4×CD box set - also included a DVD; No. 165 Billboard)
- 2009 Sinatra: New York (4×CD box set - also included a DVD)
- 2010 The Reprise Years [36-Disc - UK]

=== GPG ===
- 1995 Frank Sinatra - An American Legend (5×CD box set)

=== Longines Symphonette Society ===
- 1973 The Works (10×LP box set)

=== Sing Records ===
- 2025 Long Ago, Far Away (1943-1951) (2×LP live box set)

=== Time Life MusicGPG ===
- 1986 Legendary Singers (5×LP live box set)

=== UMe ===
- 2014 Sinatra: London (4×CD box set)
- 2016 Sinatra: World On a String (4×CD box set)
- 2018 Standing Room Only (3×CD box set)

== Singles ==
Singles are listed with B-side immediately succeeding. Where a song is listed as (by X), or (instrumental), Sinatra does not feature. (US) Number indicates highest chart position on combined Billboard charts. The chart positions before "Mr. Success" are Pre-Billboard Hot 100.

=== With the Harry James Orchestra (Columbia) ===
List of singles as vocalist, with chart positions and certifications
Year	Title	Peak
Year	Title	US
1939	"From the Bottom of My Heart"	—
1939	"It's Funny to Everyone but Me"	—
1939	"Here Comes the Night"	—
1939	"My Buddy"	—
1939	"On a Little Street in Singapore"	—
1939	"Ciribiribin"	—
1940	"Every Day of My Life"	—
1940	"All or Nothing at All"	—
1943	"All or Nothing at All" (reissue) (gold record)	2
1944	"On a Little Street in Singapore" (reissue)	27
1944	"Every Day of My Life" (reissue)	17
1944	"It's Funny to Everyone but Me" (reissue)	21

=== With the Tommy Dorsey Orchestra (RCA Victor) (1940–1942) ===
List of singles as vocalist, with chart positions and certifications
Year	Single	Peak chart positions
Year	Single	US
1940	"Too Romantic"	—
1940	"The Sky Fell Down"	—
1940	"Shake Down the Stars"	—
1940	"I'll Be Seeing You"	—
1940	"Say It (Over and Over Again)"	—
1940	"Polka Dots and Moonbeams"	18
1940	"The Fable of the Rose"	—
1940	"Imagination"	8
1940	"Devil May Care" "Fools Rush In (Where Angels Fear to Tread)"	—
1940	"Devil May Care" "Fools Rush In (Where Angels Fear to Tread)"	12
1940	"It's a Lovely Day Tomorrow" "You're Lonely and I'm Lonely"	—
1940	"It's a Lovely Day Tomorrow" "You're Lonely and I'm Lonely"	9
1940	"April Played the Fiddle"	—
1940	"Yours Is My Heart Alone"	—
1940	"I'll Never Smile Again" (gold record)	1
1940	"All This and Heaven Too"	12
1940	"East of the Sun (and West of the Moon)"	—
1940	"And So Do I" "The One I Love (Belongs to Somebody Else)"	—
1940	"And So Do I" "The One I Love (Belongs to Somebody Else)"	11
1940	"Only Forever" "Trade Winds"	—
1940	"Only Forever" "Trade Winds"	10
1940	"Love Lies" "The Call of the Canyon"	17
1940	"Love Lies" "The Call of the Canyon"	14
1940	"Whispering"	—
1940	"I Could Make You Care"	17
1940	"Our Love Affair"	5
1940	"Looking for Yesterday"	—
1940	"We Three (My Echo, My Shadow and Me)"	3
1940	"You're Breaking My Heart All Over Again"	—
1940	"When You Awake"	—
1940	"I'd Know You Anywhere"	—
1940	"Do You Know Why?"	—
1940	"Anything"	—
1940	"Not So Long Ago"	—
1940	"Stardust"	7
1941	"Oh! Look at Me Now" "You Might Have Belonged to Another"	2
1941	"Oh! Look at Me Now" "You Might Have Belonged to Another"	14
1941	"Dolores" "I Tried"	1
1941	"Dolores" "I Tried"	21
1941	"Do I Worry?"	4
1941	"Without a Song"	—
1941	"It's Always You"	—
1941	"You Lucky People You"	—
1941	"Everything Happens to Me"	9
1941	"Let's Get Away from It All"	7
1941	"I'll Never Let A Day Pass By"	—
1941	"Love Me as I Am"	—
1941	"Neiani" "This Love of Mine"	—
1941	"Neiani" "This Love of Mine"	3
1941	"I Guess I'll Have to Dream the Rest"	12
1941	"You and I"	11
1941	"Blue Skies"	—
1941	"Pale Moon"	—
1941	"Two in Love" "A Sinner Kissed an Angel"	9
1941	"Two in Love" "A Sinner Kissed an Angel"	15
1941	"The Sunshine of Your Smile"	—
1941	"Violets for Your Furs"	—
1941	"I Think of You"	20
1941	"It Isn't a Dream Anymore"	—
1942	"How About You?"	8
1942	"The Last Call for Love" "Poor You"	17
1942	"The Last Call for Love" "Poor You"	15
1942	"I'll Take Tallulah"	15
1942	"Snootie Little Cutie"	—
1942	"Somewhere a Voice Is Calling"	—
1942	"Just As Though You Were Here" "Street of Dreams"	6
1942	"Just As Though You Were Here" "Street of Dreams"	17
1942	"Be Careful, It's My Heart" "Take Me"	13
1942	"Be Careful, It's My Heart" "Take Me"	5
1942	"Light a Candle in the Chapel"	21
1942	"In the Blue of Evening"	1
1942	"There Are Such Things" (gold record) "Daybreak"	1
1942	"There Are Such Things" (gold record) "Daybreak"	17
1943	"It's Always You" (reissue)	3
1944	"I'll Be Seeing You" (reissue)	4

=== First solo singles (Bluebird Records) (1942) ===
List of singles with chart positions and certifications
Year	Single	Peak chart positions
Year	Single	US
1942	"Night and Day"	16
1942	"The Lamplighter's Serenade"	—

=== Columbia singles (1943–1952) ===
List of singles with chart positions and certifications
Year	Single	Peak chart positions
Year	Single	US
1943	"Close to You" "You'll Never Know"	10
1943	"Close to You" "You'll Never Know"	2
1943	"Sunday, Monday, or Always"	9
1943	"People Will Say We're in Love" "Oh, What a Beautiful Mornin'"	3
1943	"People Will Say We're in Love" "Oh, What a Beautiful Mornin'"	12
1944	"I Couldn't Sleep a Wink Last Night" "A Lovely Way to Spend An Evening"	4
1944	"I Couldn't Sleep a Wink Last Night" "A Lovely Way to Spend An Evening"	11
1944	"White Christmas" "If You Are But a Dream"	7
1944	"White Christmas" "If You Are But a Dream"	19
1944	"Saturday Night (Is the Loneliest Night of the Week)" "I Dream of You (More than You Dream I Do)"	2
1944	"Saturday Night (Is the Loneliest Night of the Week)" "I Dream of You (More than You Dream I Do)"	7
1945	"What Makes the Sunset?"	13
1945	"Ol' Man River" "Stormy Weather"	—
1945	"Ol' Man River" "Stormy Weather"	—
1945	"When Your Lover Has Gone" "I Should Care"	—
1945	"When Your Lover Has Gone" "I Should Care"	8
1945	"Dream"	5
1945	"Put Your Dreams Away (For Another Day)"	—
1945	"Homesick, That's All"	23
1945	"If I Loved You" "You'll Never Walk Alone" (with The Ken Lane Singers)	7
1945	"If I Loved You" "You'll Never Walk Alone" (with The Ken Lane Singers)	9
1945	"The Charm of You"	—
1945	"My Shawl"	—
1945	"Lily Belle" "Don't Forget Tonight Tomorrow" (with The Charioteers)	—
1945	"Lily Belle" "Don't Forget Tonight Tomorrow" (with The Charioteers)	9
1945	"White Christmas" (reissue)	—
1945	"Nancy (With the Laughing Face)"	10
1945	"America the Beautiful" (with The Ken Lane Singers) "The House I Live In"	—
1945	"America the Beautiful" (with The Ken Lane Singers) "The House I Live In"	22
1946	"Oh! What It Seemed to Be" "Day by Day"	1
1946	"Oh! What It Seemed to Be" "Day by Day"	5
1946	"Full Moon and Empty Arms"	17
1946	"All Through the Day"	7
1946	"They Say It's Wonderful" "The Girl That I Marry"	2
1946	"They Say It's Wonderful" "The Girl That I Marry"	11
1946	"From This Day Forward" "Something Old, Something New"	18
1946	"From This Day Forward" "Something Old, Something New"	21
1946	"Soliloquy (Part 1 & 2)"	—
1946	"Five Minutes More"	1
1946	"One Love"	—
1946	"Begin the Beguine"	23
1946	"The Coffee Song" "The Things We Did Last Summer"	6
1946	"The Coffee Song" "The Things We Did Last Summer"	8
1946	"Silent Night" (with The Ken Lane Singers)	—
1946	"Jingle Bells" (with The Ken Lane Singers)	—
1946	"September Song"	8
1947	"This Is the Night"	11
1947	"That's How Much I Love You" (with The Page Cavanaugh Trio)	10
1947	"I Want to Thank Your Folks"	—
1947	"It's the Same Old Dream" (with Four Hits and A Miss)	—
1947	"Sweet Lorraine"	—
1947	"I Believe" "Time After Time"	5
1947	"I Believe" "Time After Time"	16
1947	"Mam'selle" "Stella by Starlight"	1
1947	"Mam'selle" "Stella by Starlight"	21
1947	"Almost Like Being in Love"	20
1947	"Tea for Two"	—
1947	"Ain'tcha Ever Comin' Back" "I Have But One Heart"	21
1947	"Ain'tcha Ever Comin' Back" "I Have But One Heart"	13
1947	"Christmas Dreaming (A Little Early This Year)"	26
1947	"I've Got a Home in That Rock"	—
1947	"So Far" "A Fellow Needs a Girl"	8
1947	"So Far" "A Fellow Needs a Girl"	24
1947	"The Dum Dot Song" (with The Pied Pipers)	21
1947	"You're My Girl"	23
1948	"What'll I Do?" "My Cousin Louella" (with The Tony Mottola Trio)	23
1948	"What'll I Do?" "My Cousin Louella" (with The Tony Mottola Trio)	24
1948	"But Beautiful"	14
1948	"For Every Man There's a Woman"	—
1948	"But None Like You"	—
1948	"I've Got A Crush on You" (featuring Bobby Hackett)	—
1948	"All of Me"	21
1948	"It Only Happens When I Dance with You"	19
1948	"Nature Boy" (with The Jeff Alexander Choir)	7
1948	"Just For Now" "Everybody Loves Somebody"	21
1948	"Just For Now" "Everybody Loves Somebody"	25
1949	"Kiss Me Again"	—
1949	"Autumn in New York"	27
1949	"Senorita"	—
1949	"A Little Learnin' Is a Dangerous Thing" (with Pearl Bailey)	—
1949	"Sunflower"	14
1949	"Why Can't You Behave?" (with the Phil Moore Four)	—
1949	"Comme Ci Comme Ca"	—
1949	"If You Stub Your Toe on the Moon" (with the Phil Moore Four)	—
1949	"Bop! Goes My Heart" (with the Phil Moore Four)	—
1949	"Some Enchanted Evening" "Bali Ha'i"	6
1949	"Some Enchanted Evening" "Bali Ha'i"	18
1949	"The Right Girl for Me"	—
1949	"The Hucklebuck" (with The Ken Lane Quintet)	10
1949	"Let's Take an Old-Fashioned Walk" (with Doris Day)	17
1949	"It All Depends on You"	—
1949	"Don't Cry Joe" (with The Pastels)	9
1949	"Bye Bye Baby" (with The Pastels)	—
1949	"If I Ever Love Again" (with The Double Daters)	—
1949	"That Lucky Old Sun"	16
1949	"Mad About You"	—
1949	"The Old Master Painter" (with The Modernaires)	13
1950	"Sorry"	28
1950	"(We've Got a) Sure Thing" (with The Modernaires)	—
1950	"Chattanoogie Shoe Shine Boy" "God's Country" (with The Jeff Alexander Choir)	10
1950	"Chattanoogie Shoe Shine Boy" "God's Country" (with The Jeff Alexander Choir)	25
1950	"Kisses and Tears" (with Jane Russell)	—
1950	"American Beauty Rose" (with Mitch Miller's Dixieland Band)	26
1950	"Poinciana (Song Of the Tree)"	—
1950	"Peachtree Street" (with Rosemary Clooney)	—
1950	"Goodnight, Irene" (with The Mitch Miller Singers)	5
1950	"Life Is So Peculiar" (with Helen Carroll)	—
1950	"One Finger Melody"	9
1950	"Nevertheless (I'm In Love with You)"	14
1950	"Let It Snow" (with The Swanson Quartet)	—
1951	"I Am Loved"	—
1951	"Take My Love"	—
1951	"Love Means Love"	—
1951	"You're the One (for Me)"	17
1951	"We Kiss in a Shadow"	22
1951	"Love Me"	—
1951	"Mama Will Bark" (with Dagmar) "I'm a Fool to Want You"	21
1951	"Mama Will Bark" (with Dagmar) "I'm a Fool to Want You"	14
1951	"It's a Long Way from Your House to My House"	—
1951	"Castle Rock"	26
1951	"April in Paris"	—
1952	"I Hear a Rhapsody"	24
1952	"Feet of Clay"	—
1952	"My Girl"	—
1952	"Luna Rossa" (with The Norman Luboff Choir)	—
1952	"Bim Bam Baby" "Azure-Te (Paris Blues)"	20
1952	"Bim Bam Baby" "Azure-Te (Paris Blues)"	30
1952	"The Birth of the Blues"	19
1952	"I'm Glad There Is You"	—
1953	"Sheila" (with The Jeff Alexander Choir)	—
1954	"I'm a Fool to Want You" (reissue)	—

All orchestras conducted by Axel Stordahl, unless otherwise noted

=== Capitol singles (1953–1962) ===
List of singles with chart positions and certifications
Year	Single	Peak chart positions			Certifications
Year	Single	US BB	US CB	UK	Certifications
1953	"I'm Walking Behind You" / "Lean Baby"	7	—	—	
1953	"I'm Walking Behind You" / "Lean Baby"	25	—	—	
1953	"I've Got the World on a String" / "My One and Only Love"	14	—	—	
1953	"I've Got the World on a String" / "My One and Only Love"	28	—	—	
1953	"From Here to Eternity"	15	24	—	
1953	"South of the Border (Down Mexico Way)"	18	43	—	
1954	"Young at Heart"	2	2	12	
1954	"Don't Worry 'bout Me" / "I Could Have Told You"	17	25	—	
1954	"Don't Worry 'bout Me" / "I Could Have Told You"	21	28	—	
1954	"Three Coins in the Fountain"	4	1	1	
1954	"The Gal That Got Away" / "Half as Lovely (Twice as True)"	21	30	—	
1954	"The Gal That Got Away" / "Half as Lovely (Twice as True)"	23	20	—	
1954	"It Worries Me"	30	29	—	
1954	"The Christmas Waltz"	—	—	—	
1954	"You, My Love"	—	—	13	
1955	"Melody of Love"	19	—	—	
1955	"Why Should I Cry Over You?"	—	—	—	
1955	"Two Hearts, Two Kisses (Make One Love)"	—	—	—	
1955	"Learnin' the Blues"	1	2	2	
1955	"Not as a Stranger"	—	27	13	
1955	"Same Old Saturday Night" / "Fairy Tale"	13	23	—	
1955	"Same Old Saturday Night" / "Fairy Tale"	—	33	—	
1955	"Love and Marriage"	5	6	3	
1955	"(Love Is) The Tender Trap"	7	22	2	
1956	"Flowers Mean Forgiveness" / "You'll Get Yours"	24	27	—	
1956	"Flowers Mean Forgiveness" / "You'll Get Yours"	67	—	—	
1956	"(How Little It Matters) How Little We Know" / "Five Hundred Guys"	13	23	—	
1956	"(How Little It Matters) How Little We Know" / "Five Hundred Guys"	73	43	—	
1956	"You're Sensational" / "Wait for Me"	52	41	—	
1956	"You're Sensational" / "Wait for Me"	75	—	—	
1956	"True Love" (with Bing Crosby and Grace Kelly)	—	—	—	
1956	"Mind If I Make Love to You?"	—	—	—	
1956	"Hey! Jealous Lover"	3	8	—	
1956	"Can I Steal a Little Love?" / "Your Love for Me"	15	20	—	
1956	"Can I Steal a Little Love?" / "Your Love for Me"	60	43	—	
1956	"Willow Weep for Me"/ "One for my Baby" (UK only)	—	—	—	
1956	"Willow Weep for Me"/ "One for my Baby" (UK only)	—	—	—	
1957	"Crazy Love" / "So Long, My Love"	60	54	—	
1957	"Crazy Love" / "So Long, My Love"	74	51	—	
1957	"You're Cheatin' Yourself (If You're Cheatin' On Me)"	25	50	—	
1957	"All the Way" / "Chicago (That Toddlin' Town)"	2	7	3	
1957	"All the Way" / "Chicago (That Toddlin' Town)"	84	45	21	
1957	"Witchcraft" / "Tell Her You Love Her"	6	13	12	
1957	"Witchcraft" / "Tell Her You Love Her"	—	48	—	
1957	"Have Yourself a Merry Little Christmas"	—	—	38	BPI: Platinum
1957	"Jingle Bells"	16	—	60	BPI: Gold
1957	"Mistletoe and Holly"	—	—	—	
1958	"Nothing in Common" / "How Are Ya Fixed for Love?" (with Keely Smith)	—	—	—	
1958	"Nothing in Common" / "How Are Ya Fixed for Love?" (with Keely Smith)	22	—	—	
1958	"Monique" / "Same Old Song and Dance"	—	—	—	
1958	"Monique" / "Same Old Song and Dance"	—	74	—	
1958	"Mr. Success"	41	29	25	
1958	"To Love and Be Loved"	—	100	—	
1959	"French Foreign Legion"	61	49	18	
1959	"High Hopes"	30	22	6	
1959	"Talk to Me"	38	27	—	
1960	"It's Nice to Go Trav'ling"	—	—	48	
1960	"River, Stay 'Way from My Door" / "It's Over, It's Over, It's Over"	82	61	18	
1960	"River, Stay 'Way from My Door" / "It's Over, It's Over, It's Over"	111	—	—	
1960	"Nice 'n' Easy"	60	55	15	
1960	"Ol' Mac Donald"	25	32	11	
1961	"My Blue Heaven" / "Sentimental Baby"	—	108	33	
1961	"My Blue Heaven" / "Sentimental Baby"	—	101	—	
1961	"American Beauty Rose" / "Sentimental Journey"	—	118	—	
1961	"American Beauty Rose" / "Sentimental Journey"	—	tag	—	
1962	"I've Heard That Song Before" / "The Moon Was Yellow"	—	139	—	
1962	"I've Heard That Song Before" / "The Moon Was Yellow"	99	131	—	
1962	"I'll Remember April"	—	—	—	
1962	"Hidden Persuasion" / "I Love Paris"	—	—	—	
1962	"Hidden Persuasion" / "I Love Paris"	—	148	—	

=== Reprise singles (1961–1983) ===
List of singles with chart positions and certifications
Year	Single	Peak chart positions				Certifications
Year	Single	US BB	US CB	US AC	UK	Certifications
1961	"The Second Time Around"	50	55	—	—	
1961	"Granada"	64	58	15	15	
1961	"I'll Be Seeing You"	58	62	12	—	
1961	"Imagination"	—	—	—	—	
1961	"I'm Getting Sentimental Over You"	—	—	—	—	
1961	"There Are Such Things"	—	—	—	—	
1961	"Without a Song"	—	—	—	—	
1961	"Take Me"	—	—	—	—	
1961	"Pocketful of Miracles"	34	26	9	—	
1961	"The Coffee Song"	—	—	—	39	
1961	"Ring a Ding Ding!"	—	—	—	—	
1962	"Stardust"	98	108	20	—	
1962	"Ev'rybody's Twistin'"	75	81	—	22	
1962	"Goody Goody"	—	136	—	—	
1962	"The Look of Love"	101	118	—	—	
1962	"Me and My Shadow" (with Sammy Davis, Jr.)	64	79	18	20	
1963	"Call Me Irresponsible"	78	62	20	—	
1963	"I Have Dreamed" "Come Blow Your Horn"	—	—	—	—	
1963	"I Have Dreamed" "Come Blow Your Horn"	108	92	—	—	
1963	"A New Kind of Love" "Love Isn't Just for the Young"	—	—	—	—	
1963	"A New Kind of Love" "Love Isn't Just for the Young"	111	118	—	—	
1963	"Fugue for Tinhorns"	—	—	—	—	
1963	"Have Yourself a Merry Little Christmas"	—	—	—	—	
1964	"Stay with Me"	81	107	—	—	
1964	"My Kind of Town"	110	120	—	—	
1964	"Softly, as I Leave You"	27	38	4	—	
1964	"Hello Dolly" (with Count Basie)	—	—	—	47	
1964	"More (Theme from Mondo Cane)"	—	—	—	—	
1964	"I Heard the Bells on Christmas Day"	—	—	—	—	
1964	"We Wish You the Merriest"	—	—	—	—	
1964	"Somewhere in Your Heart"	32	32	4	—	
1965	"Anytime at All"	46	54	11	—	
1965	"Tell Her (You Love Her Each Day)" "Here's to the Losers"	57	87	16	—	
1965	"Tell Her (You Love Her Each Day)" "Here's to the Losers"	—	tag	—	—	
1965	"Forget Domani"	78	58	13	—	
1965	"When Somebody Loves You"	102	104	10	—	
1965	"Everybody Has the Right to Be Wrong!" "I'll Only Miss Her When I Think of Her"	131	101	25	—	
1965	"Everybody Has the Right to Be Wrong!" "I'll Only Miss Her When I Think of Her"	—	—	18	—	
1965	"It Was a Very Good Year" "Moment to Moment"	28	33	1	—	
1965	"It Was a Very Good Year" "Moment to Moment"	115	—	18	—	
1966	"Strangers in the Night"	1	1	1	1	BPI: Silver
1966	"Summer Wind"	25	26	1	36	
1966	"That's Life"	4	5	1	44	BPI: Platinum
1967	"Somethin' Stupid" (with Nancy Sinatra) (gold record)	1	1	1	1	BPI: Gold
1967	"The World We Knew (Over and Over)"	30	22	1	33	
1967	"This Town"	53	41	17	—	
1968	"I Can't Believe I'm Losing You"	60	63	4	—	
1968	"Cycles" "My Way of Life"	23	41	2	—	
1968	"Cycles" "My Way of Life"	64	60	3	—	
1968	"Whatever Happened to Christmas"	—	—	—	—	
1969	"Rain in My Heart"	62	51	3	—	
1969	"My Way"	27	26	2	5	BPI: Platinum
1969	"Love's Been Good to Me"	75	61	8	8	
1969	"Goin' Out of My Head" "Forget to Remember"	79	96	14	—	
1969	"Goin' Out of My Head" "Forget to Remember"	—	—	16	—	
1969	"I Would Be in Love (Anyway)"	88	118	4	—	
1969	"What's Now Is Now"	123	—	31	—	
1970	"Lady Day"	—	104	—	—	
1970	"Feelin' Kinda Sunday" (with Nancy Sinatra)	—	—	30	—	
1970	"Something" "Bein' Green"	—	—	—	—	
1970	"Something" "Bein' Green"	—	115	22	—	
1971	"Life's a Trippy Thing" (with Nancy Sinatra)	—	—	—	—	
1971	"I Will Drink the Wine"	—	—	—	16	
1973	"Let Me Try Again"	63	61	23	—	
1973	"You Will Be My Music"	—	107	39	—	
1974	"Bad, Bad Leroy Brown"	83	106	31	—	
1974	"You Turned My World Around"	83	104	11	—	
1975	"Anytime (I'll Be There)"	75	93	10	—	
1975	"I Believe I'm Gonna Love You"	47	52	2	34	
1975	"A Baby Just Like You"	—	—	—	—	
1976	"The Saddest Thing of All" "Empty Tables"	—	—	—	—	
1976	"The Saddest Thing of All" "Empty Tables"	—	—	43	—	
1976	"I Sing the Songs"	—	—	—	—	
1976	"Stargazer"	—	—	21	—	
1976	"Dry Your Eyes" "Like a Sad Song"	—	—	—	—	
1976	"Dry Your Eyes" "Like a Sad Song"	—	—	31	—	
1976	"I Love My Wife"	—	92	43	—	
1977	"Night and Day" (disco version) "Everybody Ought to Be in Love"	—	—	—	—	
1977	"Night and Day" (disco version) "Everybody Ought to Be in Love"	—	—	29	—	
1980	"Theme from New York, New York"	32	35	10	4	BPI: Gold
1980	"You and Me (We Wanted It All)"	—	—	42	—	
1981	"Say Hello"	—	—	—	—	
1983	"Here's to the Band"	—	—	—	—	
1983	"To Love a Child"	—	—	—	—	

=== Qwest singles (1984) ===
Sinatra's Qwest singles were released as part of The Complete Reprise Studio Recordings (1995), and originally appeared on L.A. Is My Lady (1984).

List of singles with chart positions
Year	Single	Peak chart positions
Year	Single	US AC
1984	"Teach Me Tonight"	—
1984	"Mack the Knife"	—
1984	"L.A. Is My Lady"	34

=== Island singles (1993) ===
List of singles with chart positions
Year	Single	Peak chart positions
Year	Single	UK
1993	"I've Got You Under My Skin" (with Bono)	4

=== Capitol singles (posthumous) ===
List of singles with chart positions
Year	Single	Peak chart positions	Certifications
Year	Single	UK	Certifications
2004	"You Make Me Feel So Young"	—	BPI: Silver

=== Holiday 100 chart entries ===
Since many radio stations in the US adopt a format change to Christmas music each December, many holiday hits have an annual spike in popularity during the last few weeks of the year and are retired once the season is over. In December 2011, Billboard began a Hot Holiday Songs chart with 50 positions that monitored the last five weeks of each year to "rank the top holiday hits of all eras using the same methodology as the Hot 100, blending streaming, airplay, and sales data", and in 2013 the number of positions on the chart was doubled, resulting in the Holiday 100. A handful of Sinatra recordings have made appearances on the Holiday 100 and are noted below according to the holiday season in which they charted there.

Title	Holiday season peak chart positions														Album
Title	2012	2013	2014	2015	2016	2017	2018	2019	2020	2021	2022	2023	2024	2025	Album
"The Christmas Song"	—	92	—	—	—	—	—	—	—	—	—	—	—	—	A Jolly Christmas from Frank Sinatra
"The Christmas Waltz"	—	—	—	—	—	—	41	60	58	78	68	—	—	93	A Jolly Christmas from Frank Sinatra
"Have Yourself a Merry Little Christmas"	48	44	41	20	23	26	49	42	56	49	39	53	45	43	A Jolly Christmas from Frank Sinatra
"I'll Be Home for Christmas"	—	—	—	—	89	—	—	—	—	97	—	—	—	—	A Jolly Christmas from Frank Sinatra
"Jingle Bells"	48	33	30	34	37	40	21	19	30	20	14	14	15	15	A Jolly Christmas from Frank Sinatra
"Let It Snow! Let It Snow! Let It Snow!" (with The B. Swanson Quartet)	—	50	50	54	45	45	53	61	48	50	60	51	68	58	Christmas Songs by Sinatra
"Mistletoe and Holly"	—	—	—	—	70	95	92	92	94	88	—	98	—	—	A Jolly Christmas from Frank Sinatra
"Santa Claus Is Coming to Town" (1947 recording)	—	—	—	—	—	—	—	—	—	—	98	77	74	86	Christmas Songs by Sinatra
"Santa Claus Is Coming to Town" (1992 duet with Cyndi Lauper)	—	73	53	46	68	64	87	—	—	80	79	—	—	—	A Very Special Christmas 2
"Silent Night"	—	74	—	—	—	—	—	—	—	—	—	—	—	—	Christmas Songs by Sinatra

== Videography ==
This is a list of programs featuring Frank Sinatra that are officially sanctioned by the Sinatra estate. Most releases consist of videotaped television specials or live concerts. Like many recording artists of the era, even major stars like Elvis Presley and The Beatles, there is very little performance footage shot on actual film to create modern day high definition releases. All titles listed have been released on DVD separately and collectively in various countries, most are also on VHS and some on LaserDisc.

- The Frank Sinatra Show (ABC, 1957–58) – at least 11 of 32 episodes released
- The Frank Sinatra Timex Show: "Bing Crosby and Dean Martin Present High Hopes" (1959, 59 minutes)
- The Frank Sinatra Timex Show: An Afternoon With Frank Sinatra aka The Frank Sinatra Show with Ella Fitzgerald (1959, 59 minutes)
- The Frank Sinatra Timex Show: Here's to the Ladies (1960, 59 minutes)
- The Frank Sinatra Timex Show: It's Nice to Go Traveling aka Welcome Home Elvis (1960, 59 minutes)
- The Royal Festival Hall aka This is Sinatra! and Sinatra Command Performance (1962, 93 minutes)
- Frank Sinatra Spectacular – only known filmed 1960s concert by the Rat Pack, Kiel Opera House, St. Louis, MO, June 20, 1965; 90 minutes)
- Frank Sinatra: A Man and His Music (1965, 51 minutes)
- A Man and His Music Part II (1966, 51 minutes)
- A Man and His Music + Ella + Jobim (1967, 52 minutes)
- Francis Albert Sinatra Does His Thing (1968, 52 minutes)
- Sinatra (1969, 52 minutes)
- Sinatra in Concert (1970, 51 minutes)
- Sinatra and Friends (1977, 50 minutes)
- Magnavox Presents Frank Sinatra aka Ol' Blue Eyes Is Back (1973, 51 minutes)
- Sinatra: The Main Event (1974, 53 minutes)
- Live from Caesars Palace (1978, 74 minutes)
- Live at Carnegie Hall (1980, 74 minutes)
- The Man and His Music (1981, 49 minutes)
- Concert for the Americas (1982, 86 minutes)
- Portrait of an Album (1985, 59 minutes)
- Sinatra in Japan (1985, 71 minutes)
- Sinatra Sings (2011, 58 minutes) – documentary narrated by Tina Sinatra
- Sinatra: All or Nothing at All (2015, 259 minutes) – documentary including Sinatra's three children and their mother

== See also ==
- List of songs recorded by Frank Sinatra
- Frank Sinatra's recorded legacy
- List of awards and nominations received by Frank Sinatra

== Bibliography ==
- Whitburn, Joel (1994), Joel Whitburn's Pop Hits, 1940-1954, Record Research Inc., ISBN 0898201063
- Whitburn, Joel (1986). Pop Memories 1890–1954: The History of American Popular Music. Menomonee Falls, WI: Record Research Inc. ISBN 0-89820-083-0.
