= Irving Cottler =

American musician (1918–1989)

- Born: February 13, 1918; Brooklyn, New York, U.S.
- Died: August 8, 1989 (aged 71) Templeton, California, U.S.
- Genre: Big band
- Occupation: Musician
- Instruments: Drums and vibraphone
- Years active: 1938–1989

Irving Cottler (February 13, 1918 – August 8, 1989) was an American musician, and an early member of The Wrecking Crew. His credits include "L-O-V-E", "Impossible", "Stardust", and "Unforgettable", recorded with Nat King Cole. Cottler also recorded and performed live with Frank Sinatra, Louis Armstrong, Bing Crosby, Walt Disney, Peggy Lee, Dinah Shore, Ella Fitzgerald, Neal Hefti, Nelson Riddle, Count Basie, and many others. He was best known as the drummer for Sinatra, with whom he worked for over 30 years beginning in 1955.

== Career ==
Cottler, born in Brooklyn in 1918, was a self-taught percussionist who began providing rhythm for the bands performing in the Catskills in New York when he was only 14. At an early age he began working with such big-band leaders as Red Norvo, Van Alexander, Larry Clinton, Alvino Ray, Claude Thornhill, Les Brown and Tommy Dorsey.

In the early 1950s, Cottler was the drummer for the NBC live broadcasts from Hollywood, and for The Dinah Shore Show. Frank Sinatra made an appearance on the show and loved Cottler's distinctive sound. Sinatra offered Cottler double what NBC was paying him.

Cottler's first recording session with Sinatra was in October 1955 on "Love Is Here To Stay", and he played on many of the remaining Songs For Swingin' Lovers tracks, alternating with Alvin Stoller. From 1956 on, he was Sinatra's preferred drummer and played on a world tour with Sinatra in 1962, as well as on his many TV recordings.

Cottler went on to perform as the drummer and percussionist on dozens of hit songs for multiple artists, including "(Love Is) The Tender Trap", "South of the Border", "I've Got You Under My Skin", and "Nice 'n' Easy" with Sinatra. In the early 1960s, Cottler was the drummer and percussionist on many Disney films, including Herbie, The Jungle Book, and Mary Poppins.

== Death ==
Cottler died of a heart attack in Templeton, California, at the age of 71.

== Discography ==
With The Andrews Sisters

- Fresh and Fancy Free (Capitol, 1957)

With Count Basie

- Basie's in the Bag (Brunswick, 1967)

With Pat Boone

- Pat Boone Sings Guess Who? (London, 1963)

With Hoagy Carmichael

- Hoagy Sings Carmichael (Pacific Jazz, 1956)

With Ray Charles

- Dedicated to You (ABC, 1961)

With Rosemary Clooney

- Love (Reprise, 1963)

With Nat King Cole

- Those Lazy-Hazy-Crazy Days of Summer (Capitol, 1963)
- L-O-V-E (Capitol, 1965)

With Sammy Davis Jr.

- It's All Over but the Swingin' (Decca, 1957)

With Billy Eckstine

- Once More With Feeling (Roulette, 1960)

With Stan Kenton

- Kenton / Wagner (Capitol, 1964)

With Barney Kessel

- To Swing or Not to Swing (Contemporary, 1955)

With Skip Martin and His Orchestra

- Perspectives in Percussion (Somerset, 1960)

With Dean Martin

- This Time I'm Swingin'! (Capitol, 1960)
- Dream with Dean (Reprise, 1964)

With André Previn

- Let's Get Away From It All (Decca, 1955)

With Carly Simon

- Playing Possum (Elektra Records, 1975)

With Frank Sinatra

- Songs for Swingin' Lovers! (Capitol, 1956)
- Close to You (Capitol, 1957)
- A Swingin' Affair! (Capitol, 1957)
- Come Dance with Me! (Capitol, 1959)
- Sinatra's Swingin' Session!!! (Capitol, 1961)
- Ring-a-Ding-Ding! (Capitol, 1961)
- Come Swing with Me! (Capitol, 1961)
- Swing Along With Me (Reprise, 1961)
- Point of No Return (Capitol, 1962)
- Sinatra's Sinatra (Reprise, 1963)
- America, I Hear You Singing (Reprise, 1964)
- Sinatra Sings Days of Wine and Roses, Moon River, and Other Academy Award Winners (Reprise, 1964)
- 12 Songs of Christmas (Reprise, 1964)
- Softly, as I Leave You (Reprise, 1964)
- My Kind of Broadway (Reprise, 1965)
- September of My Years (Reprise, 1965)
- Moonlight Sinatra (Reprise, 1966)
- Strangers in the Night (Reprise, 1966)
- Francis Albert Sinatra & Antônio Carlos Jobim (Reprise, 1967)
- The World We Knew (Reprise, 1967)
- Cycles (Reprise, 1968)
- My Way (Reprise, 1969)
- A Man Alone (Reprise, 1969)
- Sinatra & Company (Reprise, 1971)
- Some Nice Things I've Missed (Reprise, 1974)
- Trilogy: Past Present Future (Reprise, 1980)
- She Shot Me Down (Reprise, 1981)
- L.A. Is My Lady (Qwest, 1984)

With Keely Smith

- The Intimate Keely Smith (Reprise, 1964)

== Bibliography ==
- Cottler, Irv (2000). I've Got You Under My Skins. Alfred Music. ISBN 978-0739017074.
