= The Christmas Collection =

The Christmas Collection may refer to:

- Christmas Collection, a 1996 album by The Carpenters containing all tracks from their two Christmas albums, Christmas Portrait and An Old-Fashioned Christmas
- The Christmas Collection (Il Divo album), 2005
- The Christmas Collection (Amy Grant album), 2008
- Frank Sinatra Christmas Collection, 2004
- Christmas Collection (Gaither Vocal Band album), 2015
