= Sinatra Sings Cole Porter =

Compilation album by Frank Sinatra
- Released: February 1, 2008
- Recorded: 1944 – December 11, 1951
- Genre: Traditional pop, vocal jazz, standards
- Label: SBME Special MKTS

Frank Sinatra chronology
A Voice in Time: 1939-1952 (2007)	Sinatra Sings Cole Porter (2008)	Sinatra at the Movies (2008)

Sinatra Sings Cole Porter is a 2008 compilation album by American singer, Frank Sinatra. It was rated four stars by AllMusic.

== Track listing ==
- All songs were written by Cole Porter.
1. "Night and Day"
2. "Begin the Beguine"
3. "I Get a Kick Out of You"
4. "I Love You"
5. Medley: "You'd Be So Easy to Love"/"I've Got You Under My Skin"
6. "Don't Fence Me In"
7. "I Concentrate on You"
8. "Why Shouldn't I?"
9. "Just One of Those Things"
10. "Why Can't You Behave?"
11. "So in Love"
12. "You'd Be So Nice to Come Home To"
13. "Cherry Pies Ought To Be You"
14. "You Do Something to Me"
15. "I Am Loved"
16. "You Don't Remind Me"
17. "Begin the Beguine"
18. "Night and Day"

== See also ==
- Frank Sinatra Sings the Select Cole Porter (1996)
