= Sinatra '65: The Singer Today =

Compilation album by Frank Sinatra
- Released: June 1965
- Recorded: February 21, 1963 – April 14, 1965, Los Angeles
- Genre: Vocal jazz; traditional pop
- Length: 34:15
- Label: Reprise; R 6167

Frank Sinatra chronology
Softly, as I Leave You (1964)	Sinatra '65: The Singer Today (1965)	September of My Years (1965)

Singles from Sinatra '65: The Singer Today
- 1. "My Kind of Town" Released: 1964

Professional ratings
Review scores
Source	Rating
AllMusic	2/5 stars
Record Mirror	4/5 stars

Sinatra '65: The Singer Today is a 1965 compilation album by the American singer Frank Sinatra.

The album is a collection of various singles and sessions, highlighted by the hits "Luck Be a Lady", "Anytime At All", "Somewhere In Your Heart", "Stay With Me", and "Tell Her (You Love Her Each Day)". The version of "My Kind of Town" featured here contains a verse before the chorus that was edited out of the single version of the song. It is possible the album title was a nod to the Beatles' December 1964 Capitol album Beatles '65, and potentially the Beach Boys' March 1965 Capitol album The Beach Boys Today!

This album is available on compact disc, and all the songs are available on The Complete Reprise Studio Recordings 1995 box set.

== Track listing ==
1. "Tell Her (You Love Her Each Day)" (Gil Ward, Charles Watkins) – 2:42
2. "Anytime at All" (Baker Knight) – 2:22
3. "Stay With Me (Main Theme from The Cardinal)" (Jerome Moross, Carolyn Leigh) – 3:04
4. "I Like to Lead When I Dance" (Sammy Cahn, Jimmy Van Heusen) – 4:07
5. "You Brought a New Kind of Love to Me" (Sammy Fain, Irving Kahal, Pierre Norman Connor) – 2:38
6. "My Kind of Town" (unedited version) (Cahn, Van Heusen) – 3:09
7. "When Somebody Loves You" (Cahn, Van Heusen) – 1:54
8. "Somewhere in Your Heart" (Russell Faith, Clarence Keltner) – 2:29
9. "I've Never Been In Love Before" (Frank Loesser) – 2:57
10. "When I'm Not Near The Girl I Love" (E.Y. Harburg, Burton Lane) – 3:25
11. "Luck Be a Lady" (Loesser) – 5:18

== Personnel ==
- Frank Sinatra – vocals
- Ernie Freeman – arranger, conductor
- Nelson Riddle
- Don Costa
- Billy May – arranger
- Gordon Jenkins – conductor
- Morris Stoloff

== Charts ==
Chart (1965)	Peak position
US Billboard 200	9
