= Frank Sinatra Christmas Collection =

Compilation album by Frank Sinatra
- Released: October 26, 2004
- Recorded: December 20, 1957 – August 27, 1991
- Genres: Traditional pop; jazz
- Length: 53:00
- Label: Reprise

Frank Sinatra chronology
The Platinum Collection (2004)	Frank Sinatra Christmas Collection (2004)	Romance (2004)

The Frank Sinatra Christmas Collection is a 2004 Christmas compilation album from Frank Sinatra. The selection of tracks on the album spans Sinatra's career from 1957 to 1991 and includes four previously unavailable tracks—two previously unissued on CD and two previously unissued in any format—the latter the last Christmas carol Sinatra recorded.

== Description ==
The album was released by Warner Music Group on October 26, 2004. It features 18 Christmas-themed tracks recorded by Sinatra from 1957 to 1991, including all the holiday tracks recorded by Sinatra during his years with the Reprise label. Two tracks previously unissued on CD were featured on the album. They were renditions of "The Christmas Song" and "White Christmas", both duets recorded with Bing Crosby and the Nelson Riddle Orchestra from the 1957 ABC television special Happy Holidays with Bing and Frank, which aired only once, on December 20 of that year.

=== Sinatra's last recorded Christmas carol ===
A fourth previously unissued track included on the album was an acoustic recording of "Silent Night" recorded by Sinatra in 1991 with his son Frank Sinatra Jr. at the piano, for a children's charity benefit. It was Sinatra's last recorded Christmas carol. The then-75-year-old Sinatra had not made any recordings for three years, and the track was released on an album titled "The Christmas Album...A Gift Of Hope" by Children's Records. For the 2004 album release, the backing for the vocal was rearranged by former Sinatra collaborator Johnny Mandel using a group of former Sinatra backing musicians including pianist Bill Miller, guitarists Al Viola and Ron Anthony, bassists Chuck Berghofer and Jim Hughart and percussionist Larry Bunker, conducted by Sinatra Jr. Of the recording, Sinatra Jr. said "The whole crew was there ... So except for the absence of Frank Sinatra, it was a typical Sinatra recording date. We all expected he'd come walking in at any moment." According to Sinatra Jr., it took two years for producer Charles Pignone to persuade Warner Bros. to finance the recording: "This is not the kind of music that people at record companies have interest in ... They will spend millions, millions, to develop some inconsequential rock or rap group, but when Charles approached with a budget of some $30,000 to make a brand new Frank Sinatra song, there was great reluctance."

Sinatra's daughter Nancy said of the track: "It was an emotional day, because he was doing it for the children. It is so sweet and tender that it is just heart-wrenching."

== Critical reception ==
Mark Sabbatini of allaboutjazz.com described the album as uneven, with good early "swinging" tracks giving way to less interesting later recordings "drowning in strings and cheesy arrangements". He considers the two 1957 duets with Crosby a highlight. The three mid-album tracks from the 1960s, featuring vocals by Sinatra and his family, Sabbatini refers to as "tiresome ... novelty-item treatment". He described the final "Silent Night" recording by the then-75-year-old Sinatra as "... off in both pitch and cadence, and ... a terribly sad reminder of how frail he was at the end of his career." Overall, he describes the album as "a good match for two groups: those without a Sinatra holiday album wanting a sampler rather than something from a specific era and completists seeking the new songs."

Edna Gunderson of USA Today describes the final track as "a little blue" compared to the rest, which have "a merrier lilt".

== Track listing ==
No.	Title	Writer(s)	From	Length
1.	"I've Got My Love to Keep Me Warm"	Irving Berlin	Ring-a-Ding-Ding!	2:51
2.	"The Christmas Waltz" (with the Jimmy Joyce Singers and Orchestra under the direction of Nelson Riddle)	Jule Styne; Sammy Cahn	The Sinatra Family Wish You a Merry Christmas	3:11
3.	"Santa Claus Is Coming to Town" (Previously unissued version)	J. Fred Coots; Haven Gillespie	The Frank Sinatra Show (ABC) "Happy Holidays with Bing and Frank"	1:40
4.	"The Little Drummer Boy" (with Fred Waring and his Pennsylvanians)	Katherine K. Davis	12 Songs of Christmas	3:04
5.	"We Wish You the Merriest" (with Bing Crosby and Fred Waring and his Pennsylvanians)	Les Brown	12 Songs of Christmas	2:15
6.	"Have Yourself a Merry Little Christmas" (with Orchestra conducted by Gus Levene)	Hugh Martin; Ralph Blane	Have Yourself a Merry Little Christmas (Various Artists)	3:56
7.	"Go Tell It on the Mountain" (with Bing Crosby and Fred Waring and his Pennsylvanians)	Traditional; John Wesley Work III	12 Songs of Christmas	3:26
8.	"The Christmas Song" (with Bing Crosby, previously unissued version)	Mel Tormé; Robert Wells	The Frank Sinatra Show (ABC) "Happy Holidays with Bing and Frank"	1:38
9.	"I Heard the Bells on Christmas Day" (with Fred Waring and his Pennsylvanians)	Henry Wadsworth Longfellow; Johnny Marks	12 Songs of Christmas	2:36
10.	"I Wouldn't Trade Christmas" (with Tina Sinatra, Nancy Sinatra and Frank Sinatra Jr. and the Jimmy Joyce Singers and Orchestra under the direction of Nelson Riddle)	Jimmy Van Heusen; Cahn	The Sinatra Family Wish You a Merry Christmas	2:52
11.	"Christmas Memories"	Alan Bergman; Marilyn Bergman; Don Costa	1975 single	2:09
12.	"The Twelve Days of Christmas" (with Tina Sinatra, Nancy Sinatra and Frank Sinatra Jr. and the Jimmy Joyce Singers and Orchestra under the direction of Nelson Riddle)	Traditional; Van Heusen; Cahn	The Sinatra Family Wish You a Merry Christmas	4:29
13.	"The Bells of Christmas (Greensleeves)" (with Tina Sinatra, Nancy Sinatra and Frank Sinatra Jr. and the Jimmy Joyce Singers and Orchestra under the direction of Nelson Riddle)	Traditional; Van Heusen; Cahn	The Sinatra Family Wish You a Merry Christmas	3:40
14.	"An Old-Fashioned Christmas" (with Fred Waring and his Pennsylvanians)	Van Heusen; Cahn	12 Songs of Christmas	3:46
15.	"A Baby Just Like You"	John Denver; Joe Henry	1975 single	2:47
16.	"Whatever Happened to Christmas" (with the Jimmy Joyce Singers and Orchestra under the direction of Nelson Riddle)	Jimmy Webb	The Sinatra Family Wish You a Merry Christmas	3:04
17.	"White Christmas" (with Bing Crosby, previously unissued version)	Berlin	The Frank Sinatra Show (ABC) "Happy Holidays with Bing and Frank"	2:06
18.	"Silent Night" (bonus track, previously unissued version)	Josef Mohr; Franz X. Gruber	Previously unreleased	3:30
Total length:				53:00

== Certifications ==
Region	Certification	Certified units/sales
United Kingdom (BPI)	Silver	60,000^{^}
^{^} Shipments figures based on certification alone.

== Personnel ==
- Vocals: Frank Sinatra, Nancy Sinatra, Frank Sinatra Jr., Tina Sinatra, Bing Crosby, Fred Waring and his Pennsylvanians, The Jimmy Joyce Singers
- Arrangers: Nelson Riddle, Don Costa, Dick Reynolds, Harry Betts, Jack Holloran
