= Come Swing with Me! =

Studio album by Frank Sinatra
- Released: July 31, 1961
- Recorded: March 20–22, 1961
- Studio: Capitol Studio A (Hollywood)
- Genre: Vocal jazz
- Length: 31:00
- Label: Capitol
- Producer: Dave Cavanaugh

Frank Sinatra chronology
| Ring-a-Ding-Ding! (1961) | Come Swing with Me! (1961) | Sinatra Swings (1961) |

Professional ratings
Review scores
| Source | Rating |
|---|---|
| AllMusic | 3/5 stars |
| Uncut | 1/5 stars |

Come Swing with Me! is the twenty-first studio album by American singer Frank Sinatra, released in 1961.

The album is Sinatra's final swing session with Capitol Records, as his next album, Point of No Return, would be composed mainly of torch songs. In 1971 it was re-issued as a ten-track album under the name Sentimental Journey. This album is possibly unique for the orchestral arrangement and stereophonic set-up by Billy May. Due to Capitol's signature "full-spectrum Stereo sound", the audience can distinctly hear the placement of specific orchestral pieces in the studio at the time of the recording (i.e., differences in brass sections from left, to right, to all together in the center). This is most apparent to the apt listener in the album's opening hit, "Day by Day".

== Track listing ==
| No. | Title | Writer(s) | Arranged by | Length |
|---|---|---|---|---|
| 1. | "Day by Day" | Axel Stordahl, Paul Weston, Sammy Cahn | Billy May | 2:39 |
| 2. | "Sentimental Journey" | Les Brown; Ben Homer; Bud Green | Heinie Beau | 3:26 |
| 3. | "Almost Like Being in Love" | Frederick Loewe; Alan Jay Lerner | May | 2:02 |
| 4. | "Five Minutes More" | Cahn; Jule Styne | May | 2:36 |
| 5. | "American Beauty Rose" | Mack David; Redd Evans; Arthur Altman | Beau | 2:22 |
| 6. | "Yes Indeed!" | Sy Oliver | May | 2:35 |
| 7. | "On the Sunny Side of the Street" | Jimmy McHugh; Dorothy Fields | May | 2:42 |
| 8. | "Don't Take Your Love from Me" | Henry Nemo | Beau | 1:59 |
| 9. | "That Old Black Magic" | Harold Arlen; Johnny Mercer | Beau | 4:05 |
| 10. | "Lover" | Richard Rodgers; Lorenz Hart | Beau | 1:53 |
| 11. | "Paper Doll" | Johnny S. Black | May | 2:08 |
| 12. | "I've Heard That Song Before" | Cahn; Styne | May | 2:33 |
| Total length: | | | | 31:00 |

Bonus tracks
| No. | Title | Writer(s) | Arranged by | Length |
|---|---|---|---|---|
| 13. | "I Love You" | Harlan Thompson; Harry Archer | May | 2:28 |
| 14. | "Why Should I Cry Over You" | N. Miller; C. Conn | Nelson Riddle | 2:42 |
| 15. | "How Could You Do a Thing Like That to Me" | T. Glenn; A. Roberts | Riddle | 2:44 |
| 16. | "River, Stay 'Way From My Door" | Harry M. Woods; Mort Dixon | Riddle | 2:38 |
| 17. | "I Gotta Right to Sing the Blues" | Arlen; Ted Koehler | Skip Martin | 2:59 |
| Total length: | | | | 44:31 |

== Personnel ==
- Billy May — Conductor (1–13), arrangement (1, 3–4, 6–7, 11–13)
- Heinie Beau — Arrangement (2, 5, 8–10)
- Nelson Riddle — Conductor (14–16), arrangement (14–16)
- Skip Martin — Conductor (17), arrangement (17)
