= All-Time Greatest Dorsey/Sinatra Hits, Vol. 1-4 =

Compilation album by Tommy Dorsey and Frank Sinatra
- Released: 1988–90
- Recorded: 1940–42
- Genres: Jazz; swing; easy listening; traditional pop
- Length: 236:50
- Label: RCA

Tommy Dorsey and Frank Sinatra chronology
L.A. Is My Lady (1984)	All-Time Greatest Dorsey/Sinatra Hits, Vol. 1-4 (1988)	The Reprise Collection (1990)

Professional ratings
Review scores
Source	Rating
AllMusic	4/5 stars

All Time Greatest Hits, Vol. 1-4 are four compilation albums, issued by RCA Records of recordings by Tommy Dorsey and his orchestra featuring vocals by Frank Sinatra.

The albums contain hits such as "I'll Never Smile Again" and "I'll Be Seeing You".

== Track listing Vol. 1 ==
1. "The Sky Fell Down" (Louis Alter, Edward Heyman) - 3:24
2. "I'll Be Seeing You" (Sammy Fain, Irving Kahal) - 3:05
3. "Fools Rush In (Where Angels Fear to Tread)" (Bobby Bloom, Johnny Mercer) - 3:14
4. "Imagination" (Johnny Burke, Jimmy Van Heusen) - 3:12
5. "I'll Never Smile Again" (Ruth Lowe) - 3:09
6. "Our Love Affair (Roger Edens, Arthur Freed) - 3:01
7. "Oh! Look at Me Now" (Joe Bushkin, John DeVries) - 3:14
8. "Without a Song" (Edward Eliscu, Billy Rose, Vincent Youmans) - 4:28
9. "Let's Get Away from It All" (Tom Adair, Matt Dennis) - 5:00
10. "Blue Skies" (Irving Berlin) - 3:18
11. "Street of Dreams" (Sam M. Lewis, Victor Young) - 2:41
12. "Take Me" (Rube Bloom, Mack David) - 2:59
13. "Be Careful, It's My Heart" (Berlin) - 2:48
14. "There Are Such Things" (Stanley Adams, Abel Baer, George W. Meyer) - 2:41
15. "Light a Candle in the Chapel" (Duke Leonard, Nelson, E.G., Harry Pease) - 3:03

== Track listing Vol. 2 ==
1. "The One I Love (Belongs to Somebody Else)" (Isham Jones, Gus Kahn)
2. "April Played the Fiddle" (Johnny Burke, James Monaco)
3. "Stardust" (Hoagy Carmichael, Mitchell Parish)
4. "We Three (My Echo, My Shadow and Me)" (Dick Robertson, Nelson Cogane (né Nelson Cogane Fonarow; 1902–1985), Sammy Mysels)
5. "Yours Is My Heart Alone" (Franz Lehár, Ludwig Herzer, Fritz Löhner-Beda)
6. "Polka Dots and Moonbeams" (Johnny Burke, Jimmy Van Heusen)
7. "Whispering" (Vincent Rose, Richard Coburn, John Schonberger)
8. "I Could Make You Care" (Sammy Cahn, Saul Chaplin)
9. "East of the Sun (and West of the Moon)" (Brooks Bowman)
10. "Too Romantic" (Johnny Burke, James Monaco)
11. "How About You?" (Burton Lane, Ralph Freed)
12. "This Love of Mine" (Sol Parker, Hank Sanicola, Frank Sinatra)
13. "Violets for Your Furs" (Matt Dennis, Tom Adair)
14. "Dolores" (Frank Loesser, Louis Alter)
15. "Everything Happens to Me" (Matt Dennis, Tom Adair)
16. "It's Always You" (Johnny Burke, Jimmy Van Heusen)
17. "A Sinner Kissed An Angel" (Mack David, Larry Shayne)
18. "I Guess I'll Have to Dream the Rest" (Mickey Stoner, Bud Green, Martin Block)
19. "In the Blue of Evening" (Tom Adair, Alfred D'Artega)
20. "Just As Though You Were Here" (Ed DeLange, John Benson Brooks)

== Credits ==
- Executive Producer: Don Wardell
- Liner Notes: Patrick Snyder
- Digital Engineer: Dick Baxter
- Digital Producer: Chick Crumpacker
- Performers: Tommy Dorsey & His Orchestra, Frank Sinatra, Connie Haines, The Pied Pipers
