= Christmas with the Rat Pack =

Compilation album by Frank Sinatra, Dean Martin, Sammy Davis Jr.
- Released: October 22, 2002
- Recorded: Various dates
- Genre: Christmas, Musical
- Length: 55:16

Christmas with the Rat Pack is a 2002 musical album compiling Christmas songs by Frank Sinatra, Dean Martin, and Sammy Davis Jr.

== Track listing ==
1. "I've Got My Love to Keep Me Warm" – Dean Martin
2. "Mistletoe and Holly" Frank Sinatra
3. "Christmas Time All Over the World" – Sammy Davis Jr.
4. "The First Noel" – Frank Sinatra
5. "Baby, It's Cold Outside" – Dean Martin
6. "I Believe" – Frank Sinatra
7. "Silver Bells" – Dean Martin
8. "The Christmas Song" – Sammy Davis Jr.
9. "Hark! The Herald Angels Sing" – Frank Sinatra
10. "Rudolph the Red-Nosed Reindeer" – Dean Martin
11. "The Christmas Waltz" – Frank Sinatra
12. "Let It Snow! Let It Snow! Let It Snow!" – Dean Martin
13. "Have Yourself a Merry Little Christmas" – Frank Sinatra
14. Medley: "Peace on Earth"/"Silent Night" – Dean Martin
15. "Jingle Bells" – Sammy Davis Jr.
16. "White Christmas" – Dean Martin
17. "It Came Upon a Midnight Clear" – Frank Sinatra
18. "Winter Wonderland" – Dean Martin
19. "I'll Be Home for Christmas (If Only in My Dreams)" – Frank Sinatra
20. "A Marshmallow World" (live, from The Dean Martin Christmas Show) – Frank Sinatra and Dean Martin
21. "Auld Lang Syne" (live) – Frank Sinatra and Dean Martin

== Charts ==
Chart performance for Christmas with the Rat Pack
Chart (2002–2021)	Peak position
Austrian Albums (Ö3 Austria)	64
Canadian Albums (Billboard)	14
US Billboard 200	122
US Top Holiday Albums (Billboard)	4
