= Sinatra at the Movies =

2008 compilation album by Frank Sinatra

Compilation album by Frank Sinatra
- Released: April 15, 2008
- Recorded: 1955–1959
- Genre: Traditional pop; vocal jazz; swing
- Length: 56:59
- Label: Capitol

Frank Sinatra chronology
Romance: Songs From the Heart (2007)	Sinatra at the Movies (2008)	Nothing But the Best (2008)

Sinatra at the Movies is a 2008 compilation album by Frank Sinatra. Published by Capitol Records on the occasion of the 10th anniversary of Sinatra's death, it contains 20 movie songs performed by the artist during his Capitol years in the 1950s.

== Reception ==
John Bush on AllMusic remarked that, although the compilation is "not a great choice for beginners, [...] it provides a great complement to his studio albums of the '50s". Overall, he gave the album a rating of 4/5. Ross Langager, writing for PopMatters, defines the album as "a useful document of Sinatra’s singular vocal prowess", despite "oddly lacking in context", and describes the song selection as "a patchwork of classics, semi-classics, novelty songs, and even some near-filler". Eric C. Olsen on Cleveland.com complimented the audio quality, noting it "is higher than you might find on some older albums from other sources". In his opinion, the producers "attempted to provide a varied mix that includes well-known tunes along with a few surprises", resulting in "a very nice collection".

== Track listing ==
1. "(Love Is) The Tender Trap" (from The Tender Trap) (Sammy Cahn, Jimmy Van Heusen) – 2:58
2. "From Here to Eternity" (from From Here to Eternity) (Freddy Karger, Robert Wells) – 2:59
3. "I Love Paris" (from Can-Can) (Cole Porter) – 1:50
4. "How Deep Is the Ocean?" (from Meet Danny Wilson) (Irving Berlin) – 3:14
5. "I Could Write a Book" (from Pal Joey) (Richard Rodgers, Lorenz Hart) – 3:53
6. "All the Way" (from The Joker is Wild) (Cahn, Van Heusen) – 2:52
7. "Young at Heart" (from Young at Heart) (Carolyn Leigh, Johnny Richards) – 2:50
8. "Not as a Stranger" (from Not as a Stranger) (Van Heusen, Buddy Kaye) – 2:46
9. "All of Me" (from Meet Danny Wilson) (Gerald Marks, Seymour Simons) – 2:08
10. "High Hopes" (from A Hole in the Head) (Cahn, Van Heusen) – 2:41
11. "The Lady Is a Tramp" (from Pal Joey) (Rodgers, Hart) – 3:15
12. "Monique" (from Kings Go Forth) (Cahn, Elmer Bernstein) – 3:17
13. "Chicago (That Toddlin' Town)" (from The Joker Is Wild) (Fred Fisher) – 2:12
14. "Three Coins in the Fountain" (from Three Coins in the Fountain) (Jule Styne, Cahn) – 3:06
15. "I Believe" (from It Happened in Brooklyn) (Ervin Drake, Irvin Graham, Jimmy Shirl, Al Stillman) – 2:31
16. "Johnny Concho Theme (Wait For Me)" (from Johnny Concho) (Nelson Riddle, Jo Stafford) – 2:51
17. "C'est Magnifique" (from Can-Can) (Porter) – 2:01
18. "I Couldn't Sleep a Wink Last Night" (from Higher and Higher) (Harold Adamson, Jimmy McHugh) – 3:25
19. "Just One of Those Things" (from Young at Heart) (Porter) – 3:15
20. "To Love and Be Loved" (from Some Came Running) (Cahn, Van Heusen) – 2:55
