= Romance: Songs from the Heart =

Compilation album by Frank Sinatra
- Released: January 16, 2007
- Recorded: November 5, 1953 – March 22, 1961
- Genres: Traditional pop; jazz
- Length: 50:28
- Label: Capitol

Frank Sinatra chronology
Sinatra: Vegas (2006)	Romance: Songs from the Heart (2007)	A Voice in Time: 1939-1952 (2007)

Professional ratings
Review scores
Source	Rating
AllMusic	4/5 stars

Romance: Songs from the Heart is an album recorded on November 5, 1953 – March 22, 1961 by Frank Sinatra, released posthumously in 2007, that consists of 21 tracks he recorded for Capitol Records. An alternate version of the song "Nice 'n' Easy" is included on the disc. The songs were remastered for digital from their original analogue versions.

== Commercial performance ==
Romance: Songs from the Heart debuted at number 66 on the Canadian Albums Chart.

== Track listing ==
1. "I've Got You Under My Skin" (Cole Porter) – 3:43
2. "Time After Time" (Jule Styne, Sammy Cahn) – 3:28
3. "Day by Day" (Axel Stordahl, Paul Weston, Cahn) – 2:37
4. "All the Way" (Cahn, Jimmy Van Heusen) – 2:52
5. "Too Marvelous for Words" (Johnny Mercer, Richard A. Whiting) – 2:28
6. "My Funny Valentine" (Richard Rodgers, Lorenz Hart) – 2:32
7. "Love Is Here to Stay" (George Gershwin, Ira Gershwin) – 2:40
8. "I've Got a Crush on You" (G. Gershwin, I. Gershwin) – 2:17
9. "Cheek to Cheek" (Irving Berlin) – 3:06
10. "Try a Little Tenderness" (Jimmy Campbell, Reginald Connelly, Harry M. Woods) – 3:21
11. "I Wish I Were in Love Again" (Rodgers, Hart) – 2:27
12. "Angel Eyes" (Matt Dennis, Earl Brent) – 3:44
13. "In the Wee Small Hours of the Morning" (Bob Hilliard, David Mann) – 3:00
14. "As Time Goes By" (Herman Hupfeld) – 3:19
15. "At Long Last Love" (Porter) – 2:24
16. "I'll Be Seeing You" (Sammy Fain, Irving Kahal) – 2:47
17. "Almost Like Being in Love" (Frederick Loewe, Alan Jay Lerner) – 2:01
18. "Embraceable You" (G. Gershwin, I. Gershwin) – 3:23
19. "Nice 'n' Easy" [Alternate Take Previously Unreleased] (Alan Bergman, Marilyn Bergman, Lew Spence) – 2:43
20. "Where or When" – (Rodgers, Hart) – 2:32
21. "If You Are But a Dream" (Moe Jaffe, Jack Fulton, Nat Bonx) – 3:54

== Personnel ==
- Frank Sinatra – vocals
- Nelson Riddle – arranger, conductor

== Charts ==
Chart performance
Chart (2007)	Peak position
Belgian Albums (Ultratop Flanders)	99
Canadian Albums (Nielsen SoundScan)	66
Swiss Albums (Schweizer Hitparade)	60
UK Albums (Official Charts)	94
US Billboard 200	36
