= Nothing but the Best (album) =

Greatest hits album by Frank Sinatra
- Released: May 13, 2008
- Recorded: 1962–1984
- Genre: Traditional pop; vocal jazz; swing; easy listening
- Length: 74:36
- Label: Reprise

Frank Sinatra chronology
Sinatra at the Movies (2008)	Nothing but the Best (2008)	Frank Sinatra: The Greatest Concerts (2008)

Professional ratings
Review scores
Source	Rating
AllMusic	5/5 stars

Nothing but the Best is a 2008 compilation album by American singer Frank Sinatra. All the tracks on this album are recordings made when Sinatra was on his own Reprise label, thus the first track, "Come Fly with Me" is not the 1957 Capitol version. Other notable differences are "Strangers in the Night" has an extended fade out and the first cymbal hit is cut from the beginning of the "Theme from New York, New York".

The album was certified Gold by the RIAA on December 9, 2008. It has been present on the Billboard Top 200 for 135 weeks as of August 16, 2012. The album was produced by Charles Pignone, with Robert Finkelstein and Jimmy Edwards serving as executive producers.

This album is presented in 3 versions: standard edition (22 tracks), Christmas edition (22 tracks + 12 Christmas songs) and a DVD edition (22 tracks + 1 DVD concert of the artist, in addition this album is packaged in digipack format).

== Track listings ==
1. "Come Fly with Me" (Sammy Cahn, Jimmy Van Heusen) – 3:14
2. "The Best Is Yet to Come" (Cy Coleman, Carolyn Leigh) – 2:56
3. "The Way You Look Tonight" (Jerome Kern, Dorothy Fields) – 3:22
4. "Luck Be a Lady" (Frank Loesser) – 5:15
5. "Bewitched, Bothered and Bewildered" (Richard Rodgers, Lorenz Hart) – 3:00
6. "The Good Life" (Sacha Distel, Jack Reardon) – 2:27
7. "The Girl from Ipanema" (Antonio Carlos Jobim, Norman Gimbel, Vinícius de Moraes) – 3:14
8. "Fly Me to the Moon (In Other Words)" (Bart Howard) – 2:28
9. "Summer Wind" (Heinz Meier, Hans Bradtke, Johnny Mercer) – 2:55
10. "Strangers in the Night" (Bert Kaempfert, Charles Singleton, Eddie Snyder) – 2:45
11. "Call Me Irresponsible" (Cahn, Van Heusen) – 2:56
12. "Somethin' Stupid" [With Nancy Sinatra] (Carson Parks) – 2:40
13. "My Kind of Town" (Cahn, Van Heusen) – 3:11
14. "It Was a Very Good Year" (Ervin Drake) – 4:27
15. "That's Life" (Kelly Gordon, Dean Kay) – 3:07
16. "Moonlight Serenade" (Glenn Miller, Mitchell Parish) – 3:28
17. "Nothing But the Best" (Johnny Rotella) – 3:00
18. "Drinking Again" (Johnny Mercer, Doris Tauber) – 3:15
19. "All My Tomorrows" (Cahn, Van Heusen) – 4:35
20. "My Way" (Paul Anka, Claude François, Jacques Revaux, Gilles Thibault) – 4:36
21. "Theme from New York, New York" (Fred Ebb, John Kander) – 3:25
22. "Body and Soul" [Previously unissued] (Frank Eyton, Johnny Green, Edward Heyman, Robert Sour) – 4:20
23. "The Coffee Song" (Bob Hilliard, Dick Miles) – 2:51 (bonus track on Starbucks limited edition only)

Christmas edition

This is a limited re-edition of the original 1964 album 12 Songs of Christmas, by Bing Crosby, Frank Sinatra and Fred Waring and The Pennsylvanians.

Disc two
No.	Title	Writer(s)	Length
1.	"White Christmas"	Irving Berlin
2.	"It's Christmas Time Again"	Sonny Burke, Jim Harwood, Jack D. Elliot, John M. Elliott, James K. Harwood, Francis Burke
3.	"Go Tell it on the Mountain"	Traditional, John Wesley Work III
4.	"An Old-Fashioned Christmas"	Sammy Cahn, Jimmy Van Heusen
5.	"When Angels Sang of Peace"	Traditional
6.	"The Little Drummer Boy"	Katherine K. Bates
7.	"I Heard the Bells on Christmas Day"	Henry Wadsworth Longfellow, Johnny Marks
8.	"Do You Hear What I Hear?"	Noël Regney, Gloria Shayne Baker
9.	"The Secret of Christmas"	Cahn, Van Heusen
10.	"The Twelve Days of Christmas"	Traditional
11.	"Christmas Candles"	Dean Kay, Vincent O'Dea, Jay Clinton
12.	"We Wish You the Merriest"	Les Brown

== DVD edition ==
1. "Introduction by Princess Grace of Monaco"
2. "You Make Me Feel So Young"
3. "Pennies from Heaven"
4. "I've Got You Under My Skin"
5. "Something"
6. "The Lady Is a Tramp"
7. "I Get Along Without You Very Well"
8. "Didn't We"
9. "One for My Baby"
10. "I Will Drink the Wine"
11. "I Have Dreamed"
12. "My Kind of Town"
13. "My Way"

== Charts ==
=== Weekly charts ===
Weekly chart performance for Nothing But the Best
Chart (2008)	Peak position
Australian Albums (ARIA)	6
Austrian Albums (Ö3 Austria)	24
Belgian Albums (Ultratop Flanders)	59
Belgian Albums (Ultratop Wallonia)	77
Canadian Albums (Billboard)	24
Croatian International Albums (HDU)	24
Dutch Albums (Album Top 100)	98
Finnish Albums (Suomen virallinen lista)	14
German Albums (Offizielle Top 100)	25
Greek Albums (IFPI)	50
Irish Albums (IRMA)	8
Mexican Albums (Top 100 Mexico)	24
New Zealand Albums (RMNZ)	7
Portuguese Albums (AFP)	5
Scottish Albums (OCC)	16
Spanish Albums (Promusicae)	9
Swedish Albums (Sverigetopplistan)	54
Swiss Albums (Schweizer Hitparade)	21
UK Albums (OCC)	10
US Billboard 200	2
US Top Catalog Albums (Billboard)	1
US Top Jazz Albums (Billboard)	1

=== Year-end charts ===
2008 year-end chart performance for Nothing But the Best
Chart (2008)	Position
US Billboard 200	101

2009 year-end chart performance for Nothing But the Best
Chart (2009)	Position
US Billboard 200	164

== Certifications ==
Certifications for Nothing But the Best
Region	Certification	Certified units/sales
New Zealand (RMNZ)	Gold	7,500^{^}
United Kingdom (BPI)	Gold	100,000^{*}
United States (RIAA)	Gold	500,000^{^}
^{*} Sales figures based on certification alone.^{^} Shipments figures based on certification alone.
