= American Beauty Rose (song) =

"American Beauty Rose" is a 1950 song written by Hal David, Redd Evans and Arthur Altman, which was a minor hit for Eddy Howard and for Frank Sinatra in 1950. It was also popularized by Sinatra's second version as a charting single in 1961. The song was included on his Come Swing with Me! LP, as the B-side to "Sentimental Journey".

Composer and critic Alec Wilder mentioned the song in passing in his book American Popular Song: The Great Innovators, 1900–1950, noting that "Sinatra could make every song but 'Jealous Lover' and 'American Beauty Rose' sound reputable."
