= She Shot Me Down =

Studio album by Frank Sinatra
- Released: November 1981
- Recorded: April 8, July 20, 21, August 19, September 10, 1981
- Studios: Hollywood; New York City
- Genres: Vocal jazz; traditional pop
- Length: 39:10
- Label: Reprise
- Producer: Don Costa

Frank Sinatra chronology
| Trilogy: Past Present Future (1980) | She Shot Me Down (1981) | L.A. Is My Lady (1984) |

Professional ratings
Review scores
| Source | Rating |
|---|---|
| AllMusic | 3.5/5 stars |
| The Rolling Stone Album Guide | 3/5 stars |

She Shot Me Down is the fifty-sixth studio album by American singer Frank Sinatra.

This was the final album Sinatra recorded for the record label he founded, Reprise Records, and generally considered an artistic triumph that evokes the best of Sinatra during this stage of his career. The album, however, was not a commercial success.

She Shot Me Down harks back to the triumphs of Sinatra's Capitol years, a thought-provoking set of torch songs with soaring strings, lyrics fraught with loss and regret, and heart-rending, world-weary vocals.

Of the recordings chosen for the album, the only remake of a previous recording by Sinatra himself was the medley of Harold Arlen's and Ira Gershwin's "The Gal that Got Away" with Rodgers and Hart's "It Never Entered My Mind". Sinatra would bring this medley to his concert set-list with much success, evident especially during the live concerts filmed in the Dominican Republic for the Concert for the Americas. (Another remake was "She Shot Me Down", originally recorded by Sinatra on June 4, 1973, but, aside from appearing on bootleg records, this version was not officially released until 2021, when it appeared on Reprise Rarities, Volume 4.)

== Track listing ==
1. "Good Thing Going (Going Gone)" (Stephen Sondheim) – 3:53
2. "Hey Look, No Crying" (Jule Styne, Susan Birkenhead) – 5:27
3. "Thanks for the Memory" (Leo Robin, Ralph Rainger) – 4:25
4. "A Long Night" (Alec Wilder, Loonis McGlohon) – 3:44
5. "Bang Bang (My Baby Shot Me Down)" (Sonny Bono) – 3:24
6. "Monday Morning Quarterback" (Don Costa, Pamela Phillips-Oland) – 4:38
7. "South - To a Warmer Place" (Wilder, McGlohon) – 3:45
8. "I Loved Her" (Gordon Jenkins) – 4:04
9. Medley: "The Gal that Got Away"/"It Never Entered My Mind" (Harold Arlen, Ira Gershwin)/(Lorenz Hart, Richard Rodgers) – 5:50

== Personnel ==
- Frank Sinatra - vocals
- Gordon Jenkins - arranger, conductor
- Don Costa - arranger, conductor
- Nelson Riddle - arranger
- Vincent Falcone, Jr - conductor

== Recording dates ==
- April 8, 1981 - "Bang Bang (My Baby Shot Me Down)", "The Gal that Got Away"/"It Never Entered My Mind"
- July 20, 1981 - "Thanks for the Memory", "A Long Night", "I Loved Her"
- July 21, 1981 - "South - To a Warmer Place"
- August 19, 1981 - "Good Thing Going (Going Gone)"
- September 10, 1981 - "Hey Look, No Cryin'", "Monday Morning Quarterback"
