= Point of No Return (Frank Sinatra album) =

Studio album by Frank Sinatra
- Released: March 5, 1962
- Recorded: September 11–12, 1961
- Studio: Capitol Studio A (Hollywood)
- Genre: Vocal jazz; traditional pop
- Length: 39:19
- Label: Capitol
- Producer: Dave Cavanaugh; Voyle Gilmore

Frank Sinatra chronology
Sinatra and Strings (1962)	Point of No Return (1962)	Sinatra and Swingin' Brass (1962)

Professional ratings
Review scores
Source	Rating
AllMusic	3/5 stars
Encyclopedia of Popular Music	4/5 stars
New Record Mirror	4/5 stars
Uncut	4/5 stars

Point of No Return is the twenty-fifth studio album by American singer Frank Sinatra, released in March 1962 by Capitol Records. As the title reflects, the album contains Sinatra's final original recordings with Capitol Records before moving to his own Reprise Records label to achieve more artistic freedom with his recordings. However, Sinatra would later return to Capitol in order to record Duets (1993) and Duets II (1994).

Sinatra had already begun recording with Reprise as early as 1960 and had released Ring-A-Ding-Ding, I Remember Tommy, and Sinatra Swings by the time these sessions occurred. He recorded this album in a hurried two-day session in September 1961 to fulfill his contract.

The album was still a special occasion, reuniting Sinatra with Axel Stordahl, the arranger and conductor who had helped Sinatra rise to stardom with Columbia Records in the 1940s. Sinatra rushed through the sessions to fulfill his obligation to Capitol, something which upset Stordahl. Stordahl also arranged the vocalist's first Capitol session back in 1953, so his presence gave a sense of closure to the Capitol era.

On an interesting side note, Sinatra recorded a different version of "I'll Be Seeing You" only months apart during the very same year on I Remember Tommy for Reprise.

== Track listing ==
No.	Title	Writer(s)	Length
1.	"(Ah, the Apple Trees) When the World Was Young"	Johnny Mercer; M. Philippe-Gerard; Angele Marie T. Vannier	3:48
2.	"I'll Remember April"	Don Raye; Gene de Paul; Patricia Johnston	2:50
3.	"September Song"	Kurt Weill; Maxwell Anderson	4:21
4.	"A Million Dreams Ago"	Lew Quadling; Eddie Howard; Dick Jurgens	2:41
5.	"I'll See You Again"	Noël Coward	2:44
6.	"There Will Never Be Another You"	Mack Gordon; Harry Warren	3:09
7.	"Somewhere Along the Way"	Kurt Adams; Sammy Gallop	3:01
8.	"It's a Blue World"	Bob Wright; Chet Forrest	2:49
9.	"These Foolish Things (Remind Me of You)"	Jack Strachey; Harry Link; Holt Marvell	3:59
10.	"As Time Goes By"	Herman Hupfeld	3:17
11.	"I'll Be Seeing You"	Sammy Fain; Irving Kahal	2:47
12.	"Memories of You"	Eubie Blake; Andy Razaf	3:53
Total length:			39:19

CD reissue bonus tracks
No.	Title	Writer(s)	Length
13.	"Day In, Day Out"	Rube Bloom; Mercer	3:19
14.	"Don't Make a Beggar of Me"	Al Sherman	3:05
15.	"Lean Baby"	Billy May; Roy Alfred	2:35
16.	"I'm Walking Behind You"	Billy Reid	2:57
Total length:			51:15

The bonus tracks represent the rest of Sinatra's work with Axel Stordahl on Capitol Records. These songs were recorded at Sinatra's first Capitol session in April 1953 and were produced by Voyle Gilmore.

== Personnel ==
- Frank Sinatra – vocals
- Axel Stordahl – arrangement, conductor
- Heinie Beau – "ghost arranger"
- Conrad Gozzo – lead trumpet
