= Somewhere in Your Heart =

"Somewhere In Your Heart"

Single by Frank Sinatra
- Released: 1965
- Genre: Rock and roll
- Label: Reprise
- Songwriter(s): Russell Faith * Clarence Keltner

Audio
- "Somewhere In Your Heart" on YouTube

"Somewhere in Your Heart" is a song by American singer Frank Sinatra, which was a hit in 1965.

== Charts ==
Chart (1965)	Peak position
US Adult Contemporary (Billboard)	4
US Billboard Hot 100	32
