= L.A. Is My Lady =

Studio album by Frank Sinatra
- Released: August 1984
- Recorded: April 13, 16–17, May 17, 1984; New York City and Los Angeles
- Studios: A&R Studios (New York)
- Genre: Vocal jazz
- Length: 36:35
- Labels: Qwest, Warner Bros.
- Producer: Quincy Jones

Frank Sinatra chronology
She Shot Me Down (1981)	L.A. Is My Lady (1984)	Duets (1993)

Professional ratings
Review scores
Source	Rating
AllMusic	2/5 stars

L.A. Is My Lady is the fifty-seventh and final studio album by American singer Frank Sinatra, released in 1984 and produced by Quincy Jones. While the album was Sinatra's last (excluding the Duets albums), he recorded five further songs, only four of which have been officially released.

== Overview ==
The album came after an album of duets between Sinatra and Lena Horne, instigated by Jones, was abandoned after Horne developed vocal problems and Sinatra, committed to other engagements, could not wait to record. This was the first studio album Sinatra had recorded with Jones since 1964's It Might as Well Be Swing.

The studio sessions were filmed for a documentary, Frank Sinatra: Portrait of an Album, which also shows Sinatra meeting Michael Jackson for the first time.

When L.A. Is My Lady was recorded, studio technology was very advanced and Sinatra could overdub the songs, but he preferred making his records by singing live with his musicians in real time.

One notable departure for Sinatra was the clear inclusion of synthesizers on the title track.

== Video ==
Dean Martin, Quincy Jones, Nancy Sinatra, Cheryl Tiegs, Jane Fonda, La Toya Jackson, Jilly Rizzo, Donna Summer, Michael McDonald, Dyan Cannon, James Ingram, Tommy Lasorda, Dale Bozzio, Michael Jackson and Van Halen members David Lee Roth and Eddie Van Halen make cameo appearances in the video for "L.A. Is My Lady", which in turn made moderate rotation on the MTV network.

== Charts ==
The album peaked at number 58 on the Billboard 200, and number 8 on the Top Jazz Albums chart.

== Remix ==
On 2024, L.A. Is My Lady was reissued in an expanded edition, remixed by Larry Walsh, with six bonus tracks including the original vocal version of "Mack the Knife", two alternate versions of "How Do You Keep the Music Playing?" (one previously unreleased, with a Bob Florence arrangement), the outtake "Body and Soul" and a previously unissued alternate take of "After You've Gone".

== Songs ==
- This was the first time Sinatra recorded "Mack the Knife". He re-recorded the vocal on October 30, 1986 (combined with the original orchestra track) for the album's 1986 release on compact disc. The musicians that Sinatra name-checks on "Mack the Knife" are Quincy Jones, Randy Brecker, Michael Brecker, George Benson, Joe Newman, Bobby Darin, Frank Foster, and Lionel Hampton. The double bassist Major Holley scats over the opening bars of the song.
- Sammy Cahn wrote a new verse for "Teach Me Tonight", referencing Sinatra's many love affairs.
- Cahn also altered the lyrics of "Until the Real Thing Comes Along", with Sinatra claiming "I'd even punch out Mr. T for you".
- In the liner notes, Jones says he had a new arrangement of "Body and Soul" planned for the album, but Sinatra had nothing new to say with the song, and declined to record it. Nevertheless, Sinatra did record a vocal track for the song during the sessions, and Sinatra's vocal for "Body and Soul" from the L.A. Is My Lady sessions was added to a new arrangement by Torrie Zito and released as a bonus track on Nothing But the Best, a 2008 compilation album.

== Track listing ==
1. "L.A. Is My Lady" (Alan and Marilyn Bergman, Quincy Jones, Peggy Lipton Jones) – 3:12
2. "The Best of Everything" (Fred Ebb, John Kander) – 2:45
3. "How Do You Keep the Music Playing?" (A. Bergman, M. Bergman, Michel Legrand) – 3:49
4. "Teach Me Tonight" (Sammy Cahn, Gene de Paul) – 3:44
5. "It's All Right with Me" (Cole Porter) – 2:39
6. "Mack the Knife" (Marc Blitzstein, Bertolt Brecht, Kurt Weill) – 4:50
7. "Until the Real Thing Comes Along" (Mann Holiner, Alberta Nichols, Cahn, Saul Chaplin, L.E. Freeman) – 3:03
8. "Stormy Weather" (Harold Arlen, Ted Koehler) – 3:38
9. "If I Should Lose You" (Ralph Rainger, Leo Robin) – 2:36
10. "A Hundred Years from Today" (Joe Young, Ned Washington, Victor Young) – 3:04
11. "After You've Gone" (Henry Creamer, Turner Layton) – 3:15
- Quincy Jones arranged track 1.
- Torrie Zito arranged tracks 1 & 4.
- Dave Matthews & Jerry Hey arranged track 1.
- Joe Parnello arranged tracks 2 & 3.
- Frank Foster arranged tracks 6 & 11.
- Sammy Nestico arranged tracks 5, 7, 8, 9 & 10.

== Charts ==
Chart (1984)	Peak position
Australia (Kent Music Report)	66

=== Production personnel ===
- Quincy Jones – arranger, conductor, producer
- Joseph D'Ambrosio – production coordination
- David Matthews – arranger
- Sam Nestico – arranger
- Torrie Zito – arranger
- David Smith – engineer
- Gus Skinas – engineer, digital engineer
- Phil Ramone – engineer, mixing
- Jimmy Santis
- Stanley Wallace
- Allen Sides – engineer, assistant engineer, mixing assistant
- Steve Crimmel – engineer, associate engineer
- Mark Ettel
- Cliff Jones – engineer, associate remixing engineer
- Ollie Cotton – associate engineer
- Bradshaw Leigh – associate engineer
- Roger Nichols – digital engineer, associate engineer
- Bernie Grundman – mastering
- Lee Herschberg – digital mastering
- Don Hahn – remixing
- Elliot Scheiner – remixing, assistant engineer, mixing assistant
- Alan Berliner – photography
- Bill Ross
- Ed Thrasher
- William Warren
- Stan Cornyn – liner notes
