= Axel Stordahl =

American arranger (1913–1963)

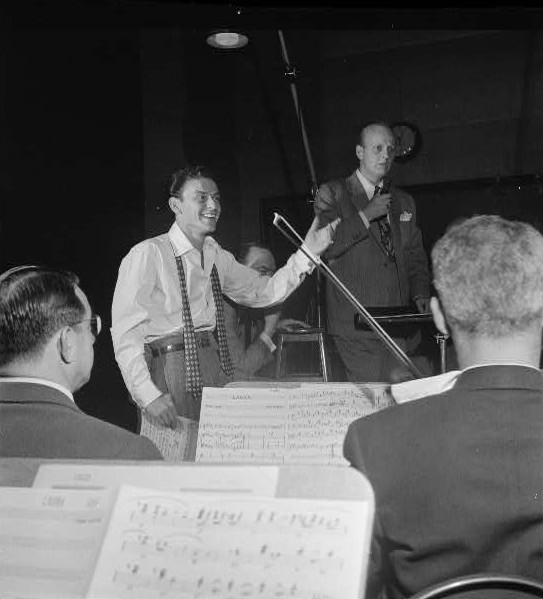
- Axel Stordahl at rehearsal with Frank Sinatra, Liederkranz Hall, New York, c. 1947

Background information
- Born: August 8, 1913; Staten Island, New York, United States
- Died: August 30, 1963 (aged 50) Encino, California, United States
- Occupations: Composer, arranger, conductor, orchestrator
- Instrument: trumpet
- Years active: late 1930s- early 1960s
- Label: Columbia Records

Axel Stordahl (August 8, 1913 – August 30, 1963) was an American arranger and composer who was active from the late 1930s through the 1950s. He is perhaps best known for his work with Frank Sinatra in the 1940s at Columbia Records. With his sophisticated orchestrations, Stordahl is credited with helping to bring pop arranging into the modern age.

== Early years ==
Stordahl was born in Staten Island, New York, United States, to Norwegian immigrant parents. He began his career as a trumpeter in jazz bands that played around Long Island and the Catskills during the late 1920s and early 1930s. He also began arranging around this time, and in 1933 he joined Anthony Fanzo's orchestra in both capacities. Over the next couple of years, Stordahl sang on the side in a vocal trio dubbed the Three Esquires.

== Big bands ==
In 1936, he joined Tommy Dorsey's new orchestra and soon became the band's main arranger. The same year appeared their first big hit, "I'm Getting Sentimental Over You". The tune quickly became Dorsey's theme song. In January 1940, Frank Sinatra joined the group as vocalist, and it became apparent that Stordahl's arrangements were particularly well suited to the singer's voice.

== Stordahl and Sinatra ==
In January 1942, when Sinatra convinced Dorsey to let him record four songs without Dorsey, Stordahl arranged Sinatra's very first commercial solo recordings for the RCA Victor subsidiary label Bluebird, and when Sinatra left Dorsey later that year to go solo, Stordahl went with him and became his music director. In the subsequent decade, Sinatra cut around three hundred sides for Columbia Records, of which three quarters were arranged by Stordahl. In addition, Stordahl provided the orchestral backings, both as arranger and conductor, for several hundreds of songs in various Sinatra radio programs. He was the credited orchestrator for the 1945 Academy Award-winning picture Anchors Aweigh which starred Frank Sinatra and Gene Kelly. His most successful songs of that time were the likes of "You'll Never Know," "Saturday Night Is the Loneliest Night of the Week," "They Say It's Wonderful," and "Mam'selle." In 1946 they recorded the album The Voice which was the first album with 8 ballads. His other songs as a composer such as "I Should Care" (1945), "Day by Day" (1946), and "Night after Night" (1949) were written with Paul Weston and Sammy Cahn.

Stordahl was admired for his skills in framing Sinatra's voice, creating a soft, opulent sound with swirling strings, understated rhythms and woodwinds. He was one of the first American arrangers to tailor his accompaniments to the vocal qualities of a specific singer. When Sinatra moved to Capitol Records in 1953, Stordahl arranged his first recording session there. Afterwards, however, Sinatra worked extensively with Nelson Riddle, who cultivated his jazz-oriented qualities, as well as Gordon Jenkins, Billy May, Don Costa, Neal Hefti, Quincy Jones, and others.

Stordahl went on to work with other singers such as Bing Crosby, Doris Day, Eddie Fisher, Dinah Shore, Nat 'King' Cole and Dean Martin, among others. Although best known as an arranger, Stordahl also composed a number of songs of which "Day by Day" with music by Axel Stordahl and Paul Weston and lyrics by Sammy Cahn, is the best known.

In 1961, Sinatra returned to collaborate with an ailing Stordahl for his final Capitol concept album, Point of No Return.

== Television and radio ==
Stordahl worked with Eddie Fisher's television program for four years and composed and orchestrated the theme to the popular television comedy series McHale's Navy.

In 1953, Fisher was signed to do a twice-weekly 15-minute program on NBC television with Coca-Cola as sponsor. Audio of the program was recorded and broadcast on a delayed basis on NBC's radio network.

In addition to his work as conductor on Sinatra's radio program, Stordahl conducted the orchestra on Eddie Fisher's Coke Time show and worked on the radio version of Your Hit Parade.

== Recording ==
In addition to providing orchestral accompaniment for recordings of well-known vocalists, Stordahl also conducted orchestras for instrumental-music albums, such as "Dreamtime: The Strings of Stordahl" (1953), "Jasmine & Jade" (1960), and "The Magic Islands Revisited" (1961).

== Personal life and honours ==
Stordahl married singer June Hutton (of the Pied Pipers) in 1951. They made some joint recordings for Capitol records.

In 1967, the Los Angeles chapter of the National Academy of Recording Arts and Sciences established a scholarship in Stordahl's memory at the University of California, Los Angeles. Only graduate students were eligible for the $300 scholarship through the music department.

Stordahl died August 30, 1963, at the age of 50 of cancer in Encino, California. He was interred in the Forest Lawn Memorial Park in Glendale, California.

== Selected compositions ==
- "I Should Care" (1945)
- "Day by Day" (1946)
- "Ain'tcha Ever Comin' Back" (1947)
- "Night After Night" (1949)
- "Meet Me at the Copa" (1950)
- Gillespie, Dizzy: Dizzy Atmosphere (1946–1952)
- MONK, Thelonious: Monk's Moods (1944–1948)

"McHale's Navy Theme"

== Albums ==
- Dreamtime: The String of Stordahl (1953)
- Christmas in Scandinavia (1959)
- The Lure of the Blue Mediterranean (1959)
- Jasmine & Jade (1960)
- The Magic Islands Revisited (1961)
- Guitars Around the World! (1962)
