= Ring-a-Ding-Ding! =

1961 studio album by Frank Sinatra

Studio album by Frank Sinatra
- Released: May 7, 1961
- Recorded: December 19–21, 1960 Los Angeles
- Genre: Vocal jazz; traditional pop
- Length: 30:38
- Label: Reprise; FS 1001

Frank Sinatra chronology
Sinatra's Swingin' Session!!! (1961)	Ring-a-Ding-Ding! (1961)	Come Swing with Me! (1961)

Professional ratings
Review scores
Source	Rating
Allmusic	3.5/5 stars
Mojo	4/5 stars
Encyclopedia of Popular Music	5/5 stars
DownBeat	5/5 stars

Ring-a-Ding-Ding!

Studio album by Frank Sinatra
- Released: June 7, 2011
- Recorded: December 19–21, 1960 Los Angeles
- Genre: Vocal jazz, classic pop
- Length: 44:08
- Label: Reprise Records

Ring-a-Ding-Ding! is the twentieth studio album by Frank Sinatra, released on May 7, 1961. It was the inaugural record on Sinatra's Reprise label and, as the initial concept was "an album without ballads", it consisted only of uptempo swing numbers.

The title track was written specifically for Sinatra by Sammy Cahn and Jimmy Van Heusen. The song "Have You Met Miss Jones?" was recorded for the album, though left off the final track listing. Ring-a-Ding-Ding! reached No. 4; it was given favorable reviews by Stereo Review, and, although a similar album (Sinatra's Swingin' Session!!!) was released by Capitol a mere two months prior, Ring-A-Ding-Ding! managed to maintain a 35-week stay on the charts. In the UK, the album reached No. 8 and stayed for 9 weeks on the chart.

The album was remastered and reissued by Concord Records on June 7, 2011, to mark its 50th anniversary. The newest CD makes a change to earlier releases, in that the original reverberation effect on Sinatra's voice has been decreased for a more natural sound.

== Track listing ==
No.	Title	Writer(s)	Length
1.	"Ring-a-Ding Ding!"	Jimmy Van Heusen; Sammy Cahn	2:44
2.	"Let's Fall in Love"	Harold Arlen; Ted Koehler	2:11
3.	"Be Careful, It's My Heart"	Irving Berlin	2:04
4.	"A Foggy Day"	George Gershwin; Ira Gershwin	2:17
5.	"A Fine Romance"	Jerome Kern; Dorothy Fields	2:11
6.	"In the Still of the Night"	Cole Porter	3:25
7.	"The Coffee Song"	Bob Hilliard; Dick Miles	2:51
8.	"When I Take My Sugar to Tea"	Irving Kahal; Sammy Fain; Pierre Norman	2:05
9.	"Let's Face the Music and Dance"	Irving Berlin	2:58
10.	"You'd Be So Easy to Love"	Cole Porter	2:24
11.	"You and the Night and the Music"	Arthur Schwartz; Howard Dietz	2:36
12.	"I've Got My Love to Keep Me Warm"	Irving Berlin	2:52
Total length:			30:38

1991 CD bonus tracks
No.	Title	Writer(s)	Length
13.	"Zing! Went the Strings of My Heart"	James F. Hanley	2:48
14.	"The Last Dance"	Jimmy Van Heusen; Sammy Cahn	2:46
15.	"The Second Time Around"	Jimmy Van Heusen; Sammy Cahn	3:03
Total length:			39:15

2011 reissue bonus tracks
No.	Title	Writer(s)	Length
13.	"Zing! Went the Strings of My Heart" (Outtake Bonus Track)	James F. Hanley	3:00
14.	"Have You Met Miss Jones?" (Previously Unreleased Outtake)	Richard Rodgers; Lorenz Hart	10:18
Total length:			43:56

== Selected personnel ==
- Frank Sinatra - vocals
- Johnny Mandel - arranger, conductor
