= Deaths in December 1984 =

The following is a list of notable deaths in December 1984.

Entries for each day are listed alphabetically by surname. A typical entry lists information in the following sequence:

- Name, age, country of citizenship at birth, subsequent country of citizenship (if applicable), reason for notability, cause of death (if known), and reference.

== December 1984 ==
=== 1 ===
- John Alexander Austin, 72, Canadian aviator.
- Wayland Becker, 74, American football player.
- Basanta Kumar Das, 86, Indian politician, MP (1952–1957, 1962–1967).
- Roelof Frankot, 73, Dutch painter.
- Sir William Haworth, 79, Australian politician, MP (1949–1969).
- Sandy Herd, 81, Scottish footballer.
- Živan Knežević, 78, Yugoslav soldier, conspirator in the 1941 Yugoslav coup d'état.
- Sir William McKie, 83, Australian organist and composer.
- Marion Orth, 83, American screenwriter.
- Josef Rodzinski, 77, German footballer.
- Joe Rue, 86, American baseball umpire.
- Alphonse Schepers, 77, Belgian racing cyclist.
- Stephen M. Young, 95, American politician, member of the U.S. Senate (1959–1971) and House of Representatives (1933–1937, 1941–1943, 1949–1951), hemolytic anemia.

=== 2 ===
- Ernest Breeze, 74, English footballer.
- Edward James, 77, British poet.
- Shigeru Makino, 56, Japanese baseball player, bladder cancer.
- Tomás Leandro Marini, 82, Argentine icthyologist.
- Charley Mehelich, 62, American football player.
- Karl Merrill, 84, American farmer and cattle breeder.
- Shirō Moritani, 53, Japanese filmmaker.
- Harry Sukman, 72, American composer, heart attack.
- Leonardo Vitale, 43, Italian mobster, shot.
- Fatalities of the Kesh ambush:
  - Kieran Fleming, 25, Northern Irish militant (Provisional Irish Republican Army), drowned.
  - Antoine Mac Giolla Bhrighde, 27, Northern Irish militant (Provisional Irish Republican Army), shot.
  - Alistair Slater, 28, British soldier, shot.

=== 3 ===
- Rolando Aguilar, 81, Mexican film director and screenwriter
- Ustad Daman, 73, Pakistani poet and politician.
- Muharrem Ertaş, 70-71, Turkish folk singer.
- Virginia Lacy Jones, 72, American librarian.
- Pavel Kutakhov, 70, Soviet flying ace and Air Force commander.
- John LaRocca, 83, Italian-born American mob boss (Pittsburgh crime family).
- Vladimir Abramovich Rokhlin, 65, Soviet mathematician.
- Alan Williams, 91, American rugby player.

=== 4 ===
- Leila Cook Barber, 81, American art historian.
- Wyndham Davies, 58, British politician, MP (1964–1966).
- James Henry Dolan, 80, American criminal.
- Seymour Fogel, 73, American artist, heart attack.
- Narasinh Narayan Godbole, 96, Indian food chemist.
- Charles Oluf Herlofson, 68, Norwegian naval officer.
- Eduard Prchal, 73, Czechoslovak pilot.
- John Rock, 94, American obstetrician and gynecologist, heart attack.
- Malcolm Shaw, 37, British comic writer, cancer.
- Ștefan Voitec, 84, Romanian politician and journalist.
- Pearl Anderson Wanamaker, 85, American politician, member of the Washington Senate (1929–1931, 1937–1940).

=== 5 ===
- William Brown, 61, British soldier, heart attack.
- Cecil M. Harden, 90, American politician, member of the U.S. House of Representatives (1949–1959), cancer.
- Bob Hogsett, 43, American basketball player and coach, shot.
- Albert Johnson, 49, American politician, leukemia.
- Ethel Mannin, 84, British novelist and political activist.
- Joe Rock, 90, American filmmaker and actor.
- Al Rogers, 75, American racing driver.
- Jaromír Zápal, 61, Czechoslovak illustrator and painter.

=== 6 ===
- Gray Barker, 59, American ufologist.
- Manny Curtis, 73, American songwriter.
- William Fleming, 18-19, Northern Irish militant (Provisional Irish Republican Army), shot.
- Frank Gerbode, 77, American surgeon.
- P. K. Manthri, 51, Indian cartoonist.
- Lucie Odier, 98, Swiss nurse.
- Tip O'Neill, 86, American football player.
- Viktor Shklovsky, 91, Soviet literary theorist.

=== 7 ===
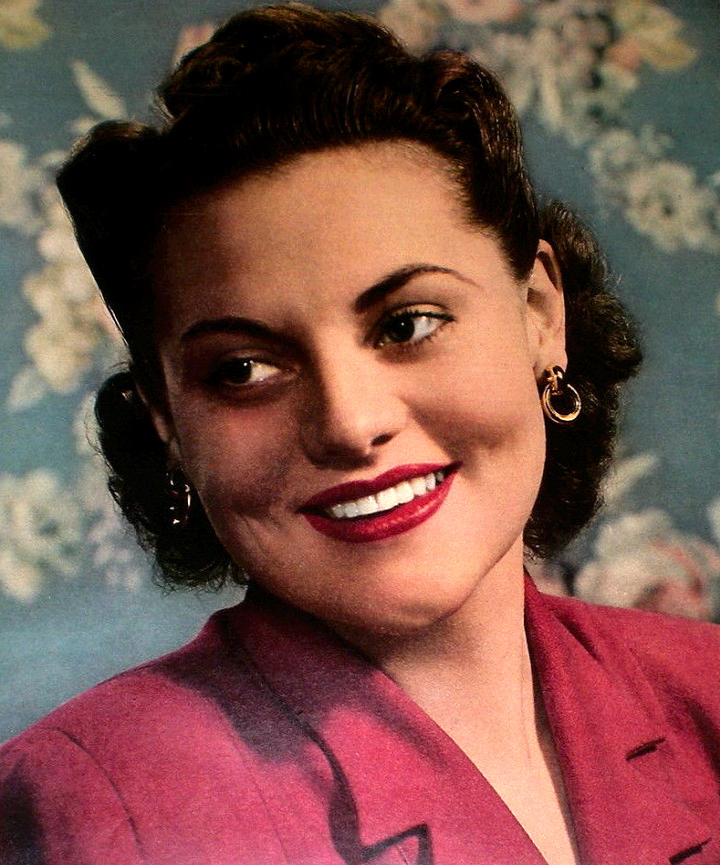
Jeanne Cagney

- San Baw, 62, Burmese surgeon, lung cancer.
- Jackson Beardy, 40, Canadian artist, heart attack.
- Jeanne Cagney, 65, American actress (Yankee Doodle Dandy), lung cancer.
- Nikolay Emanuel, 69, Soviet chemist.
- Charles Ray Hatcher, 55, American convicted serial killer, suicide by hanging.
- Jon B. Higgins, 45, American Carnatic musician, traffic collision.
- Jack Mercer, 74, American voice actor (Popeye, Felix the Cat), stomach cancer.
- Hashizo Okawa, 55, Japanese actor, cancer.
- Bernard Ormanowski, 77, Polish Olympic rower (1928).
- Howie Reed, 47, American baseball player, heart failure.
- Jan Stegmann, 97, South African rugby player.
- LeeRoy Yarbrough, 46, American racing driver, seizure.

=== 8 ===
- Luther Adler, 81, American actor.
- Walter L. J. Bayler, 79, American general.
- Vladimir Chelomey, 70, Soviet missile designer.
- Jeanne Chevalier, 92, Canadian figure skater.
- Walter Ciszek, 80, Polish-American priest and missionary.
- Earl Lemley Core, 82, American botanist.
- Rollie Culver, 76, American jazz drummer.
- Hobart Freeman, 64, American evangelist, pneumonia.
- Lisa Hession, 14, British schoolgirl, strangled.
- Solange Lamblin, 84, French politician, MP (1945–1946, 1946–1951).
- Robert Jay Mathews, 31, American neo-Nazi militant, house fire.
- Gene Ramey, 71, American jazz bassist, heart attack.
- Razzle, 24, English musician, traffic collision.
- Semih Sancar, 72-73, Turkish general.
- Paul M. Sand, 70, American jurist.
- Peter Starling, 59, British Olympic gymnast (1952, 1960).
- Mary Terán de Weiss, 66, Argentine tennis player, suicide by jumping.

=== 9 ===
- Ernesto Botto, 77, Italian flying ace.
- Thomas R. Cullen, 80, Canadian politician.
- David Dietz, 87, American science journalist, Parkinson's disease.
- Pedro Gamero del Castillo, 74, Spanish politician.
- Petro Kozak, 73, Soviet Ukrainian Greek Catholic prelate.
- William S. Lasdon, 88, American businessman and philanthropist.
- Ivor Moreton, 76, English pianist.
- Amelio Robles Ávila, 95, Mexican soldier.
- Joseph May Swing, 90, American general, pneumonia.
- Andy Uram, 69, American football player.
- Guthrie Wilson, 70, New Zealand-Australian novelist, heart attack.

=== 10 ===
- Dag Bergman, 70, Swedish diplomat.
- Jean Campbell, 83, Australian novelist.
- Barry Farrell, 49, American journalist, heart attack.
- Þorsteinn Hjálmarsson, 73, Icelandic Olympic water polo player (1936).
- Luke Johnsos, 79, American football player and coach.
- Anton Loeb, 76, Hungarian-born American illustrator and animator, cancer.
- Asoka Mehta, 73, Indian politician, MP (1954–1962, 1967–1971).
- Bice Sechi-Zorn, 55-56, Italian-American physicist.
- Adalbert Steiner, 77, Romanian footballer.
- Georges Stockly, 68, Swiss basketball player.
- Donovan Swailes, 92, Canadian politician.
- Brian Taylor, 45, British jockey, fall from horse.
- Charlie Teagarden, 71, American jazz trumpeter.
- Julio Vanzo, 83, Argentine artist.
- Vaughan Watson, 53, English footballer.

=== 11 ===
- Anton Betz, 91, German journalist.
- Nate Bowman, 41, American basketball player, cardiac arrest.
- Krafft Arnold Ehricke, 67, German-American rocket scientist.
- Pentti Hämäläinen, 54, Finnish Olympic boxer (1952, 1956).
- Robert E. Kent, 73, American filmmaker.
- Satya Churn Law, 95-96, Indian naturalist.
- Sam LoPresti, 67, American ice hockey player, heart attack.
- Fred Lowery, 75, American whistler.
- Will Paynter, 81, Welsh mining unionist.
- Lake Roberson, 66, American football player.
- Oskar Seidlin, 73, German-American linguist.
- George Waggner, 90, American filmmaker (The Wolf Man).
- Wang Xinting, 75, Chinese general.

=== 12 ===
- Natalie Robinson Cole, 82-83, American educator.
- Abdul Momen Khan, 65, Bangladeshi politician, MP (1979–1982).
- Gene Layden, 90, American baseball player.
- Red Mitchell, 72, Canadian ice hockey player.
- Walter Paulo, 82, American politician, member of the Ohio House of Representatives (1967–1972).
- Otto Schmidt, 82, German politician.
- Helmut Schreyer, 72, German electrical engineer.
- Ludwig Semrad, 76-77, Austrian humanitarian.
- Chase G. Woodhouse, 94, American politician, member of the U.S. House of Representatives (1945–1947, 1949–1951).

=== 13 ===
- Alfred Andrew-Street, 70, Australian cricketer and footballer.
- Francis Cosne, 68, French filmmaker.
- Chester R. Crain, 70, American politician.
- Clemente de la Cerda, 49, Venezuelan film director.
- Rosa Kellner, 74, German Olympic runner (1928).
- Margaret Livingston, 89, American actress.
- Jules Müller, 76, Luxembourgish football manager.
- Ngô Đình Thục, 87, Vietnamese Roman Catholic prelate.
- Bill Pemberton, 66, American jazz bassist.
- Max Schönherr, 81, Austrian composer.
- Nikolai Shchelokov, 74, Soviet politician and general, suicide by gunshot.
- Amerigo Tot, 75, Hungarian sculptor and actor.
- José Zampicchiatti, 84, Argentine Olympic cyclist (1924).
- André Zimmer, 72, Luxembourgish Olympic canoeist (1936).

=== 14 ===
- Vicente Aleixandre, 86, Spanish poet, Nobel Prize recipient (1977), kidney failure.
- László Baranyai, 64, Hungarian Olympic gymnast (1948).
- Leslie B. Butler, 79, American politician.
- Cheung Ying, 65, Chinese-Canadian actor.
- Richard C. Currier, 92, American film editor.
- Alberto Fernández, 29, Spanish racing cyclist, traffic collision.
- Vivian Granger, 65, South African football administrator.
- P. Balachandra Menon, 73, Indian politician.
- Sir Walter Stansfield, 67, British police officer.
- Robert Waring Stoddard, 78, American businessman and political organizer (John Birch Society).
- Hugo Weczerek, 74, Austrian Olympic fencer (1936).

=== 15 ===
- Kurt Axelsson, 43, Swedish footballer, traffic collision.
- Eddie Beal, 74, American jazz pianist.
- Hilde Bruch, 80, German-born American psychiatrist.
- Alonzo Patrick Fox, 89, American general.
- Traci Hammerberg, 18, American murder victim, blunt force trauma.
- J. Roderick MacArthur, 63, American businessman and philanthropist, pancreatic cancer.
- James Nimmo, 72, Australian public servant.
- Lennard Pearce, 69, English actor, heart attack.
- Jan Peerce, 80, American singer, complications from a stroke.
- Frank Spedding, 82, Canadian-born American chemist.
- George Tomer, 89, American baseball player.

=== 16 ===
- Matti Aarnio, 83, Finnish soldier.
- Karl Deichgräber, 81, German philologist.
- Debs Garms, 77, American baseball player.
- Gerd Heinrich, 88, German-American zoologist.
- William A. McGillivray, 66, Canadian jurist.
- Wilson Rawls, 71, American writer.

=== 17 ===
- Josef Beneš, 82, Czechoslovak linguist.
- Fred Cook, 62, Australian footballer.
- Wendell H. Furry, 77, American physicist.
- Thomas A. Wornham, 81, American general.
- Sonja Ferlov Mancoba, 73, Danish sculptor.
- Michael Okpara, 63, Nigerian politician.
- Isa Pola, 74, Italian actress.
- Jimmy Preston, 71, American R&B musician.
- Eduardo Quintero, 84, Filipino diplomat.
- Vegard Sletten, 77, Norwegian newspaper editor.

=== 18 ===
- Valerijonas Balčiūnas, 80, Lithuanian footballer.
- Joe Cackovic, 61, American basketball player and coach.
- Sebö Endrödi, 81, Hungarian entomologist.
- Dame Norma Holyoake, 75, New Zealand community leader, spouse of the prime minister (1957, 1960–1972).
- Ching-Yuen Hsiao, 84, Chinese-American diplomat and engineer.
- Aris Maliagros, 89, Greek actor.
- Rudolf Platte, 80, German actor.
- Charles Quaid, 76, New Zealand rugby player.
- Katsu Ryuzaki, 44, Japanese actor, cirrhosis.

=== 19 ===
- Cecil Aagaard, 68, Norwegian jazz musician.
- Harry Bollman, 82, Australian footballer.
- Edward Carrere, 78, Mexican-American art director.
- Nigel Cornwall, 81, English Anglican prelate.
- Loren Ellis, 80, American football and basketball coach.
- Thomas D. Finley, 89, American general.
- Josef Humpál, 66, Czechoslovak football player and manager.
- Michel Magne, 54, French composer, suicide.
- Gonzalo Márquez, 44, Venezuelan baseball player, traffic collision.
- Abdul Quadir, 78, Bangladeshi poet and journalist.
- Henryk Sawistowski, 59, Polish-born English academic administrator.
- Hugh Seton-Watson, 68, British historian.
- Puck van Heel, 80, Dutch footballer.
- Bill Warwick, 87, American baseball player.
- Rowland Winn, 4th Baron St Oswald, 68, British politician and hereditary peer.
- Sakubei Yamamoto, 92, Japanese artist.

=== 20 ===
- Peter Anderson, 82, American ceramist.
- Cuckoo Christensen, 85, American baseball player.
- Margery Davies, 89, British scouting group executive.
- Ray DeAutremont, 84, American convicted train robber and murderer.
- Max Deuring, 77, German mathematician.
- Figueiredo, 23, Brazilian footballer, plane crash.
- Wuzzie George, c. 104, American craftsperson and cultural preservationist.
- Isabel Alice Green, 91, Australian event manager.
- J. Lister Hill, 89, American politician, member of the U.S. Senate (1938–1969) and House of Representatives (1923–1938), pneumonia.
- Mick Kenefick, 60, Irish hurler, stroke.
- Helen Grace McClelland, 97, American nurse.
- Art McLarney, 76, American baseball player.
- Patrick Mermagen, 73, English cricketer.
- Stanley Milgram, 51, American psychologist, heart attack.
- Cyril Oxley, 80, English footballer.
- Steve Slayton, 82, American baseball player.
- Grace Cossington Smith, 92, Australian painter.
- Dmitry Ustinov, 76, Soviet field marshal and politician.

=== 21 ===
- Sam Barrett, 79, Australian footballer.
- Uri Ben Baruch, 85-86, Ethiopian-Israeli Jewish community leader.
- Margrethe Bohr, 94, Danish science writer.
- Cornelis Eliza Bertus Bremekamp, 96, Dutch botanist.
- Finlay Crisp, 67, Australian political scientist.
- Nicholas Ferraro, 56, American attorney and politician, member of the New York State Senate (1966–1973), heart attack.
- Seifollah Ghaleb, 68, Egyptian Olympic sports shooter (1952).
- Constance Endicott Hartt, 84, American botanist.
- Arne Johansen, 82, Norwegian footballer.
- Maurice Key, 79, British Anglican prelate.
- Judith Raskin, 56, American singer, ovarian cancer.
- Hector Riské, 74, Belgian Olympic wrestler (1936).
- José Luis Rodríguez Vélez, 69, Panamanian musician.
- Alcide Simard, 77, Canadian politician, MP (1965–1968).
- Ted Sloane, 81, American football player and politician, member of the Iowa House of Representatives (1943–1953), cancer.

=== 22 ===
- Leon Burns, 42, American football player, shot.
- Vilhelm Lauritzen, 90, Danish architect.
- Paul Leser, 85, German-American ethnologist.
- Edith Lindeman, 86, American songwriter and film critic.
- Frank McMahon, 65, American-Irish playwright.
- Lucy Graves Taliaferro, 89, American parasitologist.
- Sidney Vivian, 83, British actor.
- Viola Gertrude Wells, 82, American jazz singer.
- C. Brooke Worth, 76, American zoologist and virologist.

=== 23 ===
- Les Buck, 69, British trade unionist.
- Duncan Fisher, 22, Australian Olympic rower (1984), traffic collision.
- Joan Lindsay, 88, Australian novelist, stomach cancer.
- Joe Nichols, 79, American sports journalist, heart attack.
- Georg-Maria Schwab, 85, German chemist.
- René Zavaleta Mercado, 47, Bolivian sociologist and politician.

=== 24 ===
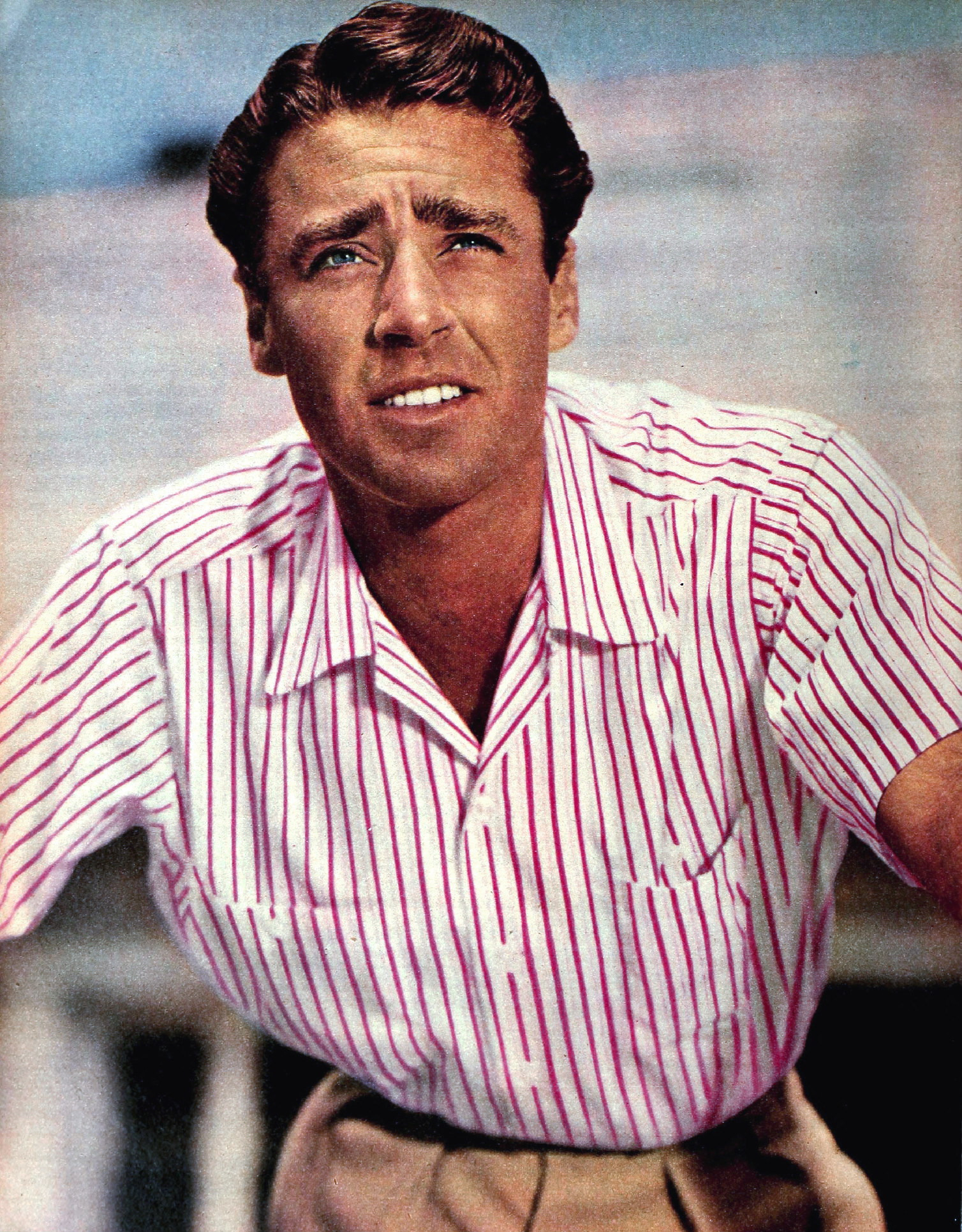
Peter Lawford

- Jupp Arents, 72, German racing cyclist.
- Eve Ball, 94, American historian.
- Edoardo Detti, 71, Italian architect and urban planner.
- Ian Hendry, 53, English actor (Get Carter, The Lotus Eaters, Live Now – Pay Later), gastrointestinal bleeding.
- Kazimierz Krukowski, 83, Polish singer and actor.
- George J. Lapthorne, 94, American politician, member of the California State Assembly (1960–1961).
- Peter Lawford, 61, English-American actor (Ocean's 11, Easter Parade, Good News), cardiac arrest.
- Jake Milford, 70, Canadian ice hockey manager, pancreatic cancer.
- Ryokichi Minobe, 80, Japanese politician, heart attack.
- Ruth Pickering Pinchot, 91, American writer.
- Tevis Clyde Smith, 76, American writer.
- Harry Waxman, 72, English cinematographer.

=== 25 ===
- Bengt Linders, 80, Swedish Olympic swimmer (1924).
- John Watson MacNaught, 80, Canadian politician, MP (1945–1957, 1963–1965).
- Raymond Smith, 61, South African cricketer.
- Robert Stott, 86, British soldier.

=== 26 ===
- Sheila Andrews, 31, American country singer, heart attack.
- Geoffrey Barraclough, 76, English historian.
- Chan Sy, 52, Cambodian politician, prime minister (since 1982).
- Johnny Gill, 79, American baseball player.
- Gayelord Hauser, 89, American nutritionist, pneumonia.
- Tebbs Lloyd Johnson, 84, British Olympic racewalker (1936, 1948).
- Bud Nygren, 66, American football player and coach.
- Jim O'Donnell, 72, American basketball player.
- John Sittig, 79, American Olympic runner (1928).
- Melvin Vines, 80, American football player and coach.

=== 27 ===
- William Black, Baron Black, 91, British vehicle manufacturer.
- Matilda J. Clerk, 68, Ghanaian physician.
- Leslie Compton, 72, English footballer and cricketer, diabetes.
- Paul Davidoff, 54, American urban planner, cancer.
- Evan-Burrows Fontaine, 86, American dancer.
- William B. Gibbs Jr., 79, American educator and civil rights activist.
- Finn Johannesen, 77, Norwegian footballer.
- Pyare Lal Kureel, 68, Indian politician, MP (1952–1957).
- Hellen Lossi, 57, Guatemalan socialite, first lady (1974–1978).
- Robert Allan Gus Lyons, 94, Canadian politician.
- Gerda Matejka-Felden, 83, Austrian painter.
- Ed Neal, 65, American football player.
- Shirley Petway, 76, American baseball player.
- Xu Hanhao, 76, Taiwanese politician.
- Yevgeny Zababakhin, 67, Soviet physicist.

=== 28 ===
- Eddie Brown, 52, American percussionist, heart disease.
- Alfred Cowles, 93, American economist.
- Lucien Fortin, 72, Canadian politician.
- Peter Kihss, 72, American journalist.
- Isaak Kikoin, 76, Soviet physicist.
- Hans Larive, 69, Dutch naval officer.
- Wendell D. Mansfield, 85, American football coach.
- Theodore Newcomb, 81, American social psychologist, complications from a stroke.
- Patrick Joseph Nolan, 90, Irish physicist.
- Sam Peckinpah, 59, American film director (The Wild Bunch, Convoy, Bring Me the Head of Alfredo Garcia), heart failure.
- Mary Stewart, Baroness Stewart of Alvechurch, 81, British politician and educator.
- Robert Lee Willie, 26, American convicted serial killer, execution by electric chair.

=== 29 ===
- Indus Arthur, 43, American actress, brain cancer.
- Aung Zan Wai, 91, Burmese diplomat and politician.
- Stanley Banham, 71, English cricketer.
- Roy Conacher, 68, Canadian ice hockey player, cancer.
- Robert Farren, 75, Irish poet.
- Sidney Garfield, 78, American physician.
- Desmond Governey, 64, Irish politician, TD (1961–1977, 1981–1982).
- Gregor Hradetzky, 75, Austrian Olympic canoeist (1936).
- Walther Hubatsch, 69, German historian.
- Ranginui Parewahawaha Leonard, 112, New Zealand supercentenarian.
- Tadashi Mamiya, 72-73, Japanese painter.
- P. H. Polk, 86, American photographer.
- Leo Robin, 89, American songwriter ("Diamonds Are a Girl's Best Friend", "Thanks for the Memory").
- Nic Schiøll, 83, Norwegian artist.
- Madan Lal Shukla, 56, Indian politician, MP (1977–1979).
- Siegfried Uiberreither, 76, Austrian Nazi official, complications from Alzheimer's disease.
- R. C. Williams, 96, American public health official.
- Fred Wright, 77, English-born American cartoonist, cancer.

=== 30 ===
- Giorgio Matteo Aicardi, 93, Italian painter.
- Harry Ellis Blackwell, 76, American politician.
- Sten Bodvar Liljegren, 99, Swedish Anglist.
- Massa, 54, Ghanaian-born American gorilla.
- Alex Mendur, 77, Indonesian photojournalist.
- Lydia Poser, 75, German politician.
- Howard Richardson, 67, American playwright.
- Moraima Secada, 54, Cuban singer.
- Jerzy Solarz, 54, Polish Olympic gymnast (1952).
- William Bedell Stanford, 74, Irish politician.
- Barbara M. White, 64, American diplomat and academic administrator, cancer.
- Juha Widing, 37, Finnish-born Canadian ice hockey player, heart attack.

=== 31 ===
- Lee Case, 67, American Olympic water polo player (1948).
- Pol Duwez, 77, Belgian-American materials scientist.
- Jean Gilbert-Jules, 81, French politician.
- K. R. Ramanathan, 91, Indian physicist.
- Chester Ronning, 90, Canadian diplomat and politician, pneumonia.
