= List of senators of Somme =

Location of Somme in France

Following is a list of senators of Somme, people who have represented the department of Somme in the Senate of France.

== Third Republic ==
Senators for the Somme under the French Third Republic were:

- Charles de Dompierre d'Hornoy (1876–1882)
- Marie-Joseph Vaysse de Rainneville (1876–1882)
- Albert Dauphin (1876–1898)
- Henri Labitte (1882–1885)
- Victor Magniez (1882–1890)
- Frédéric Petit (1886–1895)
- Gustave-Louis Jametel (1890–1893)
- Achille Bernot (1893–1909)
- Louis Froment (1895–1909)
- Alfred Maquennehen (1899–1900) and 1909–1915
- Paul Tellier (1900–1904)
- Henri Raquet (1901–1909)
- Gustave Trannoy (1905–1907)
- Ernest Cauvin (1907–1922)
- Alphonse Fiquet (1909–1916)
- Albert Rousé (1909–1920)
- René Gouge (1920–1925)
- Paul Thuillier-Buridard (1920–1926)
- Amédée Pierrin (1920–1936)
- Anatole Jovelet (1923–1940)
- Louis-Lucien Klotz (1925–1928)
- Edmond Cavillon (1926–1936)
- Henry Bourdeaux (1929–1940)
- Gérard de Berny (1936–1940)
- Joseph Harent (1936–1940)

== Fourth Republic ==
Senators for the Somme under the French Fourth Republic were:

Period	Name	Party	Notes
1946–1948	Paul Duclercq	MRP	
1946–1948	Augustin Dujardin	PCF	
1948–1952	Omer Capelle	Rally of the French People (RPF)	
1948–1952	Marcelle Delabie	Radical	
1948–1952	Jean Gilbert-Jules	Radical	
1952–1958	Omer Capelle	Rally of the French People (RPF)	
1952–1958	Marcelle Delabie	Radical	Elected deputy in November 1958
1952–1958	Jean Gilbert-Jules	Radical	

== Fifth Republic ==
Senators for the Somme under the French Fifth Republic were:

Period	Name	Party	Notes
1959–1968	Omer Capelle	National Centre of Independents and Peasants (CNI)	Died in 1966
1959–1968	Raymond de Wazières	Radical	
1959–1968	Pierre Garet	Independent Republicans (RI)	
1959–1968	Raymond de Wazières	Radical	
1959–1968	Pierre Garet	Independent Republicans (RI)	
1959–1968	Pierre Maille	Democratic Centre (CD)	Replaced Omer Capelle in 1966
1968–1977	Raymond de Wazières	Radical	
1968–1977	Pierre Garet	Independent Republicans (RI)	Died in 1972
1968–1977	Pierre Maille	Democratic Centre (CD)	Died in 1973
1968–1977	Raymond de Wazières	Radical	
1968–1977	Ernest Reptin	Independent Republicans (RI)	Replaced Pierre Garet in 1972 until his own death in 1976
1968–1977	Gabrielle Scellier	Democratic Centre (CD)	Replaced Pierre Maille in 1973
1977–1986	Max Lejeune	Social Democratic Party (France) (MDSF)	
1977–1986	Charles-Edmond Lenglet	Miscellaneous left (DVG)	
1977–1986	Jacques Mossion	Miscellaneous right (DVD)	
1986–1995	Max Lejeune	Union for French Democracy (UDF); Social Democratic Party (France) (PSD)	
1986–1995	Charles-Edmond Lenglet	Miscellaneous right (DVD)	
1986–1995	Jacques Mossion	Union for French Democracy (UDF); Centre of Social Democrats (CDS)	
1995–2004	Fernand Demilly	Union for French Democracy (UDF); Democratic Force (France) (FD)	
1995–2004	Marcel Deneux	Union for French Democracy (UDF); Democratic Force (France) (FD)	
1995–2004	Pierre Martin	Rally for the Republic (RPR)	
2004-2014	Marcel Deneux	Union for French Democracy (UDF)	
2004-2014	Daniel Dubois	Union for French Democracy (UDF)	
2004-2014	Pierre Martin	Union for a Popular Movement (UMP)	
From 2014	Jérôme Bignon	Union for a Popular Movement (UMP); Agir	
From 2014	Daniel Dubois	Union of Democrats and Independents (UDI)	
From 2014	Christian Manable	Socialist Party (PS)	

== Sources ==
- Liste des anciens sénateurs de la IIIème République par circonscription (in French), Sénat de France
- Liste des anciens sénateurs de la IVème République par circonscription (in French), Sénat de France
- Liste des anciens sénateurs de la Vème République par circonscription (in French), Sénat de France
