= Bice (disambiguation) =

Bice is a mineral pigment.

Bice may also refer to:

== People ==
- Bo Bice (born 1975), American singer and musician
- David F. Bice (born 1945), American retired Marine Corps major general, former Inspector General of the United States Marine Corps
- Greg Bice (born 1981), American lacrosse player
- Jack Bice (1884–1967), Australian politician, son of John Bice
- John George Bice (1853–1923), South Australian politician
- Mark Bice (born 1984), Canadian curler
- Olivette Bice (born 1968), Vanuatuan sprinter
- Percy Bice (1915–1985), former Australian rules footballer
- Raymond Bice Sr. (1896–1994), American politician
- Robert Bice (1914–1968), American actor
- Steve Bice (born 1981), Canadian curler
- Stephanie Bice (born 1973), American politician
- Beatrice Bice Curiger (born 1948), Swiss art historian, curator, critic and publisher
- Beatrice Bice Lazzari (1900–1981), Italian painter
- Bice Mizzi (1899–1985), Maltese pianist born Beatrix Vassallo
- Bice Sechi-Zorn (1928–1984), Italian-born American nuclear physicist
- Bice Vanzetta (born 1961), Italian cross-country skier
- Beatrice Portinari (1265–1290), nicknamed Bice, Italian woman commonly identified as the principal inspiration for Dante Alighieri's text Vita Nuova and identified with the Beatrice who acts as his guide in Alighieri's poems Divine Comedy, Paradiso and Purgatorio
- Bice Valori (1927–1980), Italian actress, comedian and television and radio personality
- Bice Waleran, stage name of Italian actress Edvige Maria Valcarenghi (1886–1969), mother of filmmaker Sergio Leone

== Other uses ==
- BiCE Ristorante, also known simply as BiCE, a former Italian restaurant in New York City
- B.I.C.E., the U.S. Bureau of Immigration and Customs Enforcement

== See also ==
- Bice Oval, Christies Beach, South Australia, a public park
