= Fiquet =

Fiquet is a French surname. Notable people with the surname include:

- Alphonse Fiquet (1841–1916), French politician
- Julia Fiquet (born 2001), French singer
- Marie-Hortense Fiquet (1850–1922), French artists' model
