= Vanzo =

Vanzo is a surname. Notable people with the surname include:

- Alain Vanzo (1928–2002), French opera singer and composer
- Anna Kriebel Vanzo (1881–1926), Norwegian opera singer
- Dorino Vanzo (born 1950), Italian racing cyclist
- Fred Vanzo (1916–1976), American football player
- Gregg Vanzo (born 1961), American animator
- Julio Vanzo (1901–1984), Argentine artist
