= Frédéric Petit =

Frédéric Petit may refer to:

- Frédéric Petit (astronomer) (1810–1865), first director of the Toulouse Observatory
- Frédéric Petit (19th-century politician) (1836–1895), mayor of Amiens and member of the French Senate representing Somme
- Charles Frédéric Petit (1857–1947), French competitive archer
- Frédéric Petit (21st-century politician) (born 1961), member of the French National Assembly for the Seventh constituency for French residents overseas since 2017
- Frédéric Petit (motorcyclist) (born 1975), Grand Prix motorcycle racer
