= Jack Delaney (musician) =

American jazz musician

- Birth name: Jack Michael Delaney
- Born: August 27, 1930; New Orleans, Louisiana, U.S.
- Died: September 22, 1975 (aged 45); New Orleans, Louisiana, U.S.
- Genres: Jazz, Dixieland
- Instruments: Trombone

Jack Michael Delaney (August 27, 1930 – September 22, 1975) was an American jazz trombonist, active principally in the New Orleans jazz scene.

== Early life and education ==
Delaney was born in New Orleans and attended Southeastern Louisiana College.

== Career ==
Delaney played professionally with Johnny Reininger from 1949 to 1951. For much of the 1950s he worked with Sharkey Bonano and Tony Almerico in various settings, and also played as a sideman for Raymond Burke, Ken Colyer, Pete Fountain, Monk Hazel, Leon Kellner, and Lizzie Miles. He also led his own bands, which included Alvin Alcorn, Lee Collins, and Rollie Culver.
