= Lucy Graves Taliaferro =

American parasitologist

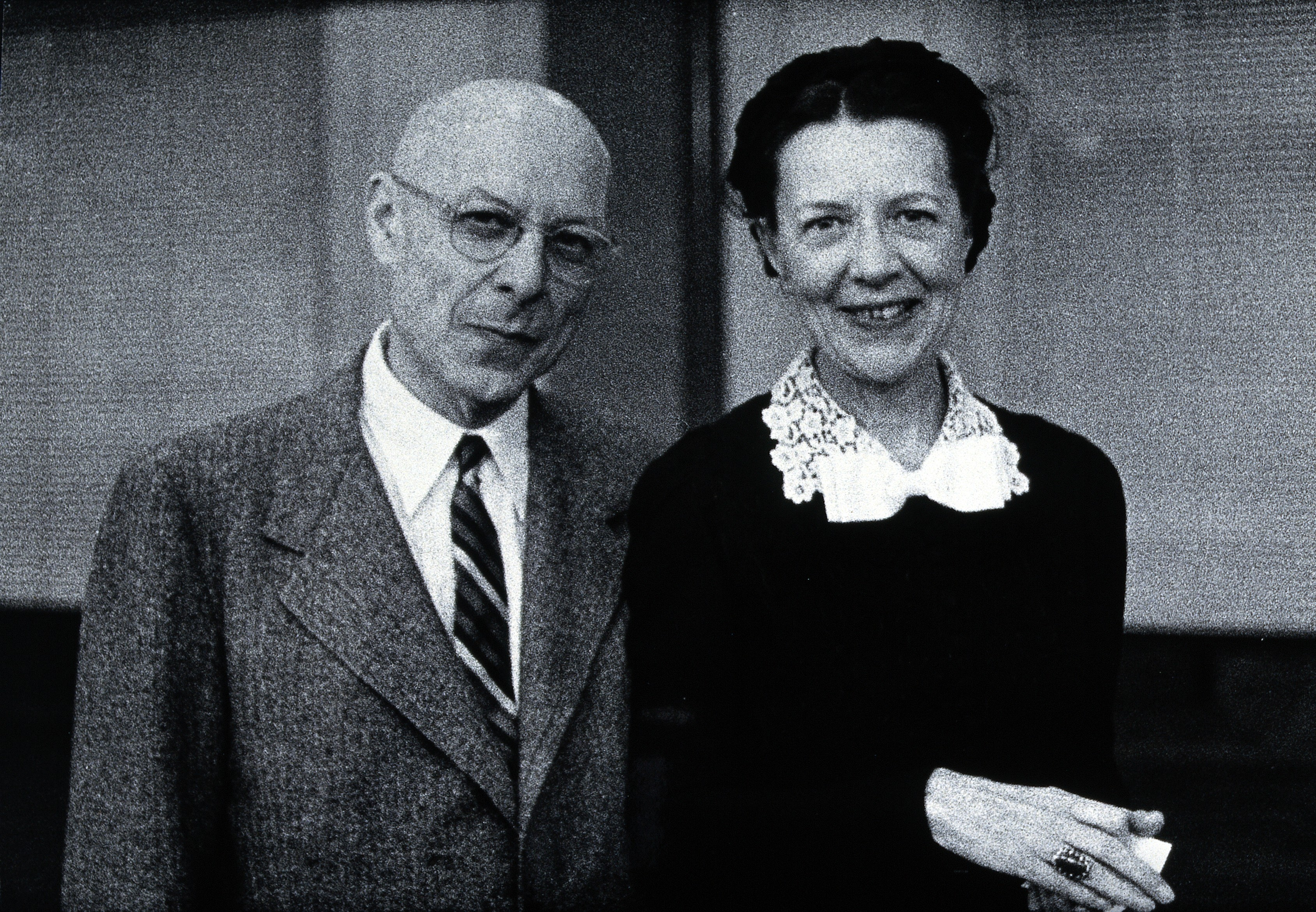
Lucy Graves Taliaferro and her husband, William Hay Taliaferro.

Lucy Engel Graves Taliaferro (25 July 1895 – 22 December 1984) was an American parasitologist and professor, notable for her research in parasitology and immunology. She and her husband, William Hay Taliaferro, worked together as research partners from 1919 to 1973. She worked as a researcher in her husband's parasitology laboratory for over 30 years at the University of Chicago, where she co-taught a parasitology course with William and achieved the rank of Assistant Professor, although she was never paid. After retiring from the University of Chicago in 1960, the Talioferros researched the effects of ionizing radiation on the immune response at Argonne National Laboratory and coauthored Radiation and Immune Mechanisms (1964).

== Biography ==
Lucy Engel Graves was born on July 25, 1895, in Cleveland, Ohio, to her parents, Clara Walter and Herbert Cornelius Graves. She studied biology at Goucher College from 1913 to 1917 and graduated with a Bachelor of Arts in 1917 after election to Phi Beta Kappa. While a student at Goucher College, Lucy traveled to Washington, D.C., with about thirty other students to participate in a women's suffrage picket outside of the White House. Students had been barred from participating by the president of Goucher College, President William W. Guth, due to the political unrest at the time, and Lucy and her fellow students were reprimanded. Lucy's political activity has led her to since be recognized as a suffragist.

Following her graduation from Goucher College, Lucy studied invertebrate zoology for the summer at the Marine Biological Laboratory in Woods Hole, Massachusetts. Here she met William Hay Taliaferro, whom she would later marry, although they were both engaged to other people at the time. After her summer studies, Lucy taught high school science for a year in Alexandria, Virginia, before working as a chemist-clerk for the Gas Defense Division of the Chemical Warfare Service of the United States Army, abstracting German articles on gases. In 1918, she was transferred to New York City, where she again encountered William, who was also working for the army in the Division of Chemical Warfare at Yale. The two eventually disengaged their previous fiancees and became engaged to each other, marrying on June 6, 1919.

The newly married couple moved near Baltimore, Maryland, where Lucy had enrolled at Johns Hopkins University School of Hygiene and Public Health, working as a technical assistant in the department of medical zoology. In 1922, Lucy published her first paper, “The Resistance of Different Hosts to Experimental Trypanosome Infections,” with William, who was a member of the faculty. She received her Sc.D. in 1925 after publication of her thesis, “Infection and Resistance in Bird Malaria.”

Following her graduation from Johns Hopkins University, Lucy and William moved to Chicago to work at the University of Chicago. William had joined the Department of Hygiene and Bacteriology in 1924, becoming a full professor in 1927, and Lucy worked as a research associate in his lab. The Taliaferros worked together as a research team and traveled throughout Europe and the Americas for thirty-six years, including ten three-month trips to Central and South America. During their time at the University of Chicago, the Taliaferros studied malarial parasites, the host-parasite relationship, and the mechanisms of the formation of hemolysin and antibody, as well as researching the antimalarial mechanisms of quinine during World War II. Together, they published over 100 works.

In addition to her scientific work, Lucy also co-taught a parasitology course at the University of Chicago with William and Frances Coventry, a former classmate from Goucher. Lucy achieved the rank of Assistant Professor; however, despite this accomplishment and her extensive scientific career, Lucy was unpaid by the University of Chicago.

The Taliaferros retired from the University of Chicago in 1960 and moved to Lemont, Illinois to work at the Argonne National Laboratory. At Argonne, Lucy and her husband studied the effects of ionizing radiation on the immune system and together published their book Radiation and Immune Mechanisms in 1964.

In 1969, the Taliaferros retired from Argonne National Laboratory and lived the rest of their lives in LaGrange, Illinois. William died on December 21, 1973. Lucy died on December 22, 1984. The Taliaferros are buried together in Virginia, where William was born and raised.

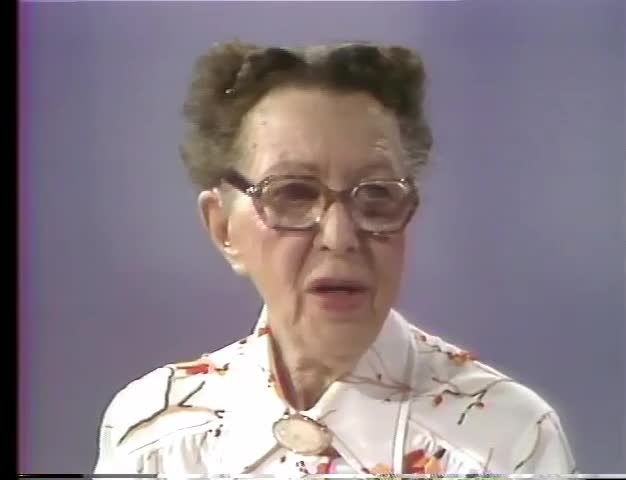
Dr. Lucy Graves Taliaferro discusses her and husband's life and work together in an interview with Monroe M. Vincent for the Center of Disease Control (1980).

== Work ==
Lucy Taliaferro worked as a researcher in the field of parasitology throughout her life alongside her husband William Hay Taliaferro. She specialized in tropical parasitology, specifically trypanosomes, a group of unicellular parasitic protozoa found in tropical regions that include Trypanosoma brucei, which causes sleeping sickness. At the University of Chicago, she studied host-parasite reactions, the mechanisms of antibody and hemolysin formation, and, during World War II, the malaria-causing plasmodium parasite and the antimalarial properties of quinine, which is now the most common treatment of malaria. After retiring from the University of Chicago, she moved to study the effects of ionizing radiation on the immune response at the Argonne National Laboratory and published Radiation and Immune Mechanisms with William Hay Taliaferro in 1964. Lucy and William Taliaferro worked as a research team throughout their careers and published over one hundred papers together. While William has received numerous honors and awards for the work they did together, Lucy was little recognized besides co-authorship. Despite her research and rank of Assistant Professor, the University of Chicago never paid Lucy.

After receiving her Sc.D. from Johns Hopkins University, the Taliaferros began work at the University of Chicago, where they stayed for over thirty years. Their early work included research into Trypanosoma lewisi, a parasite of the rat, which the Taliaferros found to initiate formation of not only antibodies that had lytic properties, but also antibodies that were also capable of inhibiting the reproduction of the parasite. William termed these reproduction-inhibiting antibodies ablastins. The Taliaferros studied other trypanosomes, including Trypanosoma muscili, in a variety of organisms and found that only the mouse developed ablastins against T. muscili. Although Lucy and William Taliaferro were a research team, only William received broad recognition for this research. For their early work on trypanosomes, William received numerous recognitions and he was included in a group of University of Chicago scientists who met monthly for dinner meetings while their wives, including Lucy, dined separately.

The Taliaferros' work distinguishing killing and reproduction-inhibiting antibodies produced during trypanosome infections led them to continue investigating host immunity to parasites by studying malarial parasites. Although they were unable to find ablastins in their blood samples from infected animals, their work on malarias allowed them to better understand innate and adaptive immunity by following macrophage and lymphocyte activity throughout the bodies of the infected animals over the course of the infection.

During their time at the University of Chicago, the Taliaferros took ten three-month trips to Central and South America. They traveled three times to Panama to study malaria and on other trips they worked on a precipitin test for malaria and tests for other tropical parasites. They also brought home various parasite-infected animals for continued study.

During World War II, the Taliaferros worked with a group seeking to identify antimalarial drugs and performed a comprehensive study of the mechanism of quinine. Their research on malaria led to their publication of a review of the role of the lymphoid macrophage system in 1949 and another review on the effects of X-rays on the immune response, that was originally a classified document written for the U.S. Atomic Energy Commission but was published publicly in 1951. The U.S. Atomic Energy Commission partly subsidized all of the Taliaferros' future work.

Following the war, the Taliaferros switched their focus from parasites to antibody formation and lysis. They studied the hemolysin response in rabbits, including the effects of whole or partial X-ray radiation of the rabbit on the hemolysin response. While their findings of initial suppression of the response following irradiation had been previously well-documented, their discovery of later recovery and even enhancement of the hemolysin response had been unknown. They also identified production of antibodies with identical antigen-specificity but different properties, a result which preceded the classification of antibodies into five classes, or isotypes, and various subclasses.

In addition to her research, Lucy co-taught a parasitology course with William and Frances Coventry, a former classmate from Goucher, and achieved the rank of Assistant Professor.

Lucy and William Taliaferro retired from the University of Chicago in 1960 and moved to Lemont, Illinois to continue working at Argonne National Laboratory. Here, they continued their research on the effects of ionizing radiation on the immune response, and in 1964, the Taliaferros co-authored Radiation and Immune Mechanisms. They retired from the Argonne National Laboratory in 1969, although they continued to publish papers.

== Bibliography ==
1922 With W. H. Taliaferro. The resistance of different hosts to experimental trypanosome infections, with especial reference to a new method of measuring this resistance. Am. J. Hyg., 2:264-319.

1925 Infection and Resistance in Bird Malaria.

1927 With W. H. Taliaferro and A. B. Fisher. A precipitin test in malaria. J. Prev. Med., 1:343-57. Trypanosomiasis. In: A Textbook of Medicine, 2d ed., ed. R. L. Cecil, pp. 377–80. Philadelphia: W.

B. Saunders.

1928 With W. H. Taliaferro. A precipitin test in malaria; Second report. J. Prev. Med., 2:147-67.

1929 With W. H. Taliaferro. Acquired immunity in avian malaria. I. Immunity to superinfection. J. Prev. Med., 3:197-208.

With W. H. Taliaferro. Acquired immunity in avian malaria. II. The absence of protective antibodies in immunity to superinfection. J. Prev. Med., 3:209-23.

1931 With W. H. Taliaferro. Skin reactions in persons infected with Schistosoma mansoni. P. R. J. Public Health Trop. Med., 7:23-35.

1934 With W. H. Taliaferro. Complement fixation, precipitin, adhesion, mercuric chloride and Wassermann tests in equine trypanosomiasis of Panama (murrina). J. Immunol., 26:193-213.

With W. H. Taliaferro. The transmission of Plasmodium falciparum to the howler monkey, Alouatta sp. I. General nature of the infections and morphology of the parasites. Am. J. Hyg., 19:318-34.

With W. H. Taliaferro. Morphology, periodicity and course of infections of Plasmodium brasilianum in Panamanian monkeys. Am. J. Hyg., 20:1-49.

With W. H. Taliaferro. Alteration in the time of sporulation of Plasmodium brasilianum in monkeys by reversal of light and dark. Am. J. Hyg., 20:50-59.

With W. H. Taliaferro. Superinfection and protective experiments with Plasmodium brasilianum in monkeys. Am. J. Hyg., 20:60-72.

1940 With W. H. Taliaferro. Active and passive immunity in chickens against Plasmodium lophurae. J. Infect. Dis., 66:153-65.

1944 With W. H. Taliaferro. The effect of immunity on the asexual reproduction of Plasmodium brasilianum. J. Infect. Dis., 75:1-32.

1945 With W. H. Taliaferro and E. L. Simmons. Increased parasitemia in chicken malaria (Plasmodium gallinaceum and Plasmodium lophurae) following X-irradiation. J. Infect. Dis., 77:158-76.

With W. H. Taliaferro. Immunological relationships of Plasmodium gallinaceum and Plasmodium lophurae. J. Infect. Dis., 77:224-48.

1947 With W. H. Taliaferro. Asexual reproduction of Plasmodium cynomolgi in rhesus monkeys . J. Dis, 80:78-104.

1948 With W. H. Taliaferro. Reduction in immunity in chicken malaria following treatment with nitrogen mustard. J. Infect. Dis., 82:5-30.

1949 With W. H. Taliaferro. The role of the spleen and lymphoid macrophage system in the quinine treatment of gallinaceum malaria. III. The action of quinine and of immunity on the parasite. J. Infect. Dis., 84:187-220.

With W. H. Taliaferro. Asexual reproduction of Plasmodium knowlesi in rhesus monkeys. J. Infect. Dis., 85:107-25.

1950 With W. H. Taliaferro. Reproduction-inhibiting and parasiticidal effects on Plasmodium gallinaceum and Plasmodium lophurae during initia l infection and homologous superinfection in chickens. J. Infect. Dis., 86:275-94.

With W. H. Taliaferro. The dynamics of hemolysin formation in intact and splenectomized rabbits. J. Infect. Dis., 87:37-62.

With W. H. Taliaferro. Effect of X-irradiation on hemolysin decline. J. Infect. Dis., 87:201-9.

1951 With W. H. Taliaferro. Effect of X-rays on immunity: A review. J. Immunol. 66:181-212.

With W. H. Taliaferro. The role of the spleen in hemolysin production in rabbits receiving multiple antigen injections. J. Infect. Dis., 89:143-68.

1952 With W. H. Taliaferro. The role of the spleen and the dynamics of hemolysin production in homologous anamnesis. J. Infect. Dis., 90:205-32.

With W. H. Taliaferro and E. F. Janssen. The localization of X-ray injury to the initial phases of antibody response. J. Infect. Dis., 91:105-24.

1954 With W. H. Taliaferro. Effect of X-rays on hemolysin formation following various immunization and irradiation procedures. J. Infect. Dis., 95:117-33.

With W. H. Taliaferro. Further studies on the radio-sensitive stages in hemolysin formation. J. Infect. Dis., 95:134-41.

With W. H. Taliaferro. Transfer of antibody-forming capacity in splenic materials. Science, 119:585-86.

1955 With W. H. Taliaferro. Reactions of the connective tissue in chickens to Plasmodium gallinaceum and Plasmodium lophurae. I. Histopathology during initial infections and superinfections. J. Infect. Dis., 97:99-136.

1956 With W. H. Taliaferro. X-ray effects on hemolysin formation in rabbits with the spleen shielded or irradiated. J. Infect. Dis., 99:109-28.

1957 With W. H. Taliaferro. The effect of repeated doses of X-rays on the hemolysin response in rabbits. J. Infect. Dis., 101:85-99.

With W. H. Taliaferro. Amino acid incorporation into precipitin at different stages in the secondary response to bovine serum albumin. J. Infect. Dis., 101:252-74.

1958 With W. H. Taliaferro and A. Pizzi. Avidity and intercellular transfer of hemolysin. Fed. Proc., 17:536.

1959 With W. H. Taliaferro and A. Pizzi. Avidity and intercellular transfer of hemolysin. J. Infect. Dis., 105:197-221.

1961 With W. H. Taliaferro. Intercellular transfer of gamma A-1 and gamma A-2 Forssman hemolysins. Proc. Natl. Acad. Sci. USA, 47:713-24.

1962 With W. H. Taliaferro. Immunnologic unresponsiveness during the initial and anamnestic Forssman hemolysin response. I. Repeated injections of heated sheep red cell stromata into rabbits before and after splenectomy. II. Spleen, bone marrow, lymph node and other tissue transfers. J. Infect. Dis., 110: 165–200.

1963 With W. H. Taliaferro. The effect of antigen dosage on the Forssman hemolysin response in rabbits. J. Infect. Dis., 113:155-69.

1964 With W. H. Taliaferro. The relation of radiation dosage to enhancement, depression and recovery of the initial Forssman hemolysin response in rabbits. J. Infect. Dis., 114:285-303.

With W. H. Taliaferro and B. N. Jaroslow. Radiation and Immune Mechanisms. New York: Academic Press. 152 pp.

1965 With W. H. Taliaferro. Enhancement of natural hemolysin in adult rabbits after radiation. Proc. Natl. Acad. Sci. USA, 53:139-46.

1966 With W. H. Taliaferro. Persistence of hemolysin anamnestic reactivity in rabbits. Proc. Natl. Acad. Sci. USA, 56:1151-54.

1967 With W. H. Taliaferro. Effect of 5-bromodeoxyuridine on the hemolysin response in rabbits. Proc. Soc. Exp. Biol. Med., 124: 671–75.

1968 With W. H. Taliaferro. The hemolytic immunoglobulins produced by unirradiated and irradiated rabbits immunized with Forssman antigens. J. Infect. Dis., 118:278-88.

1969 With W. H. Taliaferro. Effects of radiation on the initial and anamnestic IgM hemolysin responses in rabbits; antigen injection after X-rays. J. Immunol., 103:559-69.

1970 With W. H. Taliaferro. Effects of radiation on the initial and anamnestic hemolysin responses in rabbits; antigen injection before X-rays. J. Immunol., 104:1364-76.

With W. H. Taliaferro. The cellular reactions in the skin of normal and immune rabbits injected with Trichinella with special reference to the hematogenous origin of macrophages. In: Srivastava Commemorative Volume, ed. K. S. Singh, pp. 517–26. Izatnager, U. P., India: Indian Vet. Res. Inst.

With W. H. Taliaferro. Actinomycin D. before and during primary and secondary anti-Forssman immunoglo bulin hemolysin responses in rabbits. Proc. Natl. Acad. Sci. USA, 66:1036-43.

1976 With W. H. Taliaferro. Methods and applications of radiation in immunological research. In: Methods in Immunology and Immunochemistry, ed. C. A. Williams and M. W. Chase, vol. 5, pp. 239–59. New York: Academic Press.
