= Heinie Beau =

American jazz musician

- Also known as: Henry Beau
- Born: March 8, 1911; Mount Calvary, Wisconsin, U.S.
- Died: April 18, 1987 (aged 76) Burbank, California, U.S.
- Genres: Jazz
- Instruments: Clarinet, saxophone

Heinie Beau (March 8, 1911 – April 18, 1987) was an American jazz composer, arranger, saxophonist and clarinetist, most notable for his swing clarinet work and recordings done with Tommy Dorsey, Peggy Lee, Frank Sinatra and Red Nichols.

== Early life ==
Beau was born in Mount Calvary, Wisconsin. His parents and all eight siblings played various instruments. At the age of 15, while still in high school, he joined the family dance band, the Wally Beau Orchestra, which played at numerous venues in the Midwest during the 1930s and 1940s. Beau's brothers Wally and Harvey, along with sister Marie, were part of the group, along with other musicians such as Rollie Culver.

== Career ==
Living in Hollywood, California, Beau worked as an arranger and musician on television, radio and recordings, including contributing classic charts to Sinatra's Capitol repertoire. Beau wrote the big band arrangement of "Lean Baby", the first single Sinatra recorded for Capitol in 1953. Beau had also recorded extensively in Europe, touring areas such as London.

His work can be heard on an early Ella Fitzgerald recording of "Would You Like to Take a Walk?", along with Dave Barbour and his Orchestra, on Decca from 1951. In 1958, he recorded Moviesville Jazz for Coral. Beau arranged and conducted for composer Wayne Shanklin on the 1959 hit, "The Big Hurt", for Toni Fisher on Signet Records, arranged and conducted on Fisher's Signet LP, and released an English version of Marguerite Monot's "Milord" as "Your Royal Majesty". He ghost-arranged for Axel Stordahl and Billy May on Frank Sinatra recordings.

In 1980, he and his wife, Grace, formed their own label, Henri Records, and recorded three albums entitled Hollywood Jazz Quartet in 1980, Blues for Two with Eddie Miller in 1982 and Midnight Clarinet with Bob Havens in 1984.

== Personal life ==
Beau married Grace Burleton, of Oakfield, Wisconsin, in 1936. They had two daughters, Marguerite and Claudia. He died in Burbank, California.
