= Tadashi Mamiya =

Japanese painter

- Born: 1911
- Died: 29 December 1984 (aged 72–73)
- Occupation: Painter

Tadashi Mamiya (1911 – 29 December 1984) was a Japanese painter. His work was part of the painting event in the art competition at the 1936 Summer Olympics.
