= BiCE Ristorante =

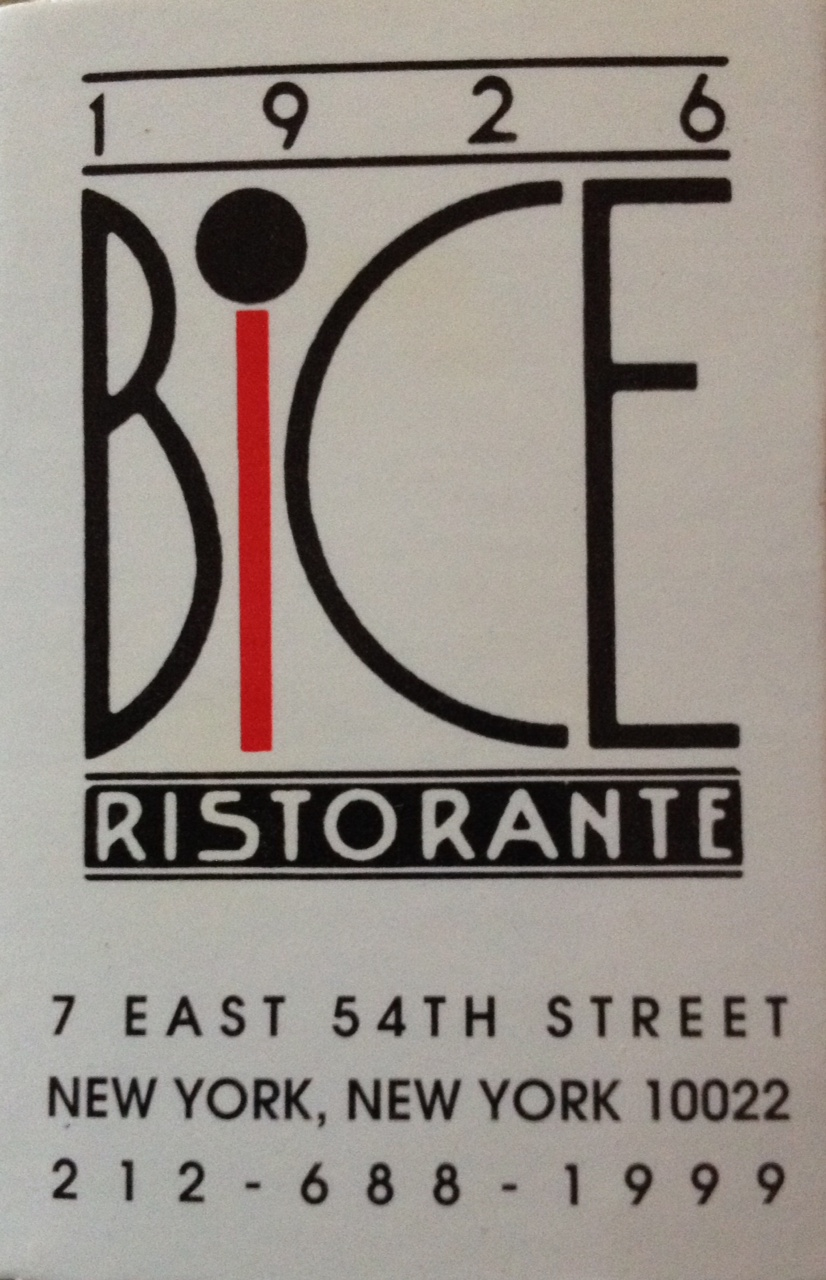
- BiCE Ristorante matchbook circa 1994
- Interactive map of BiCE Ristorante

Restaurant information
- Established: 1987; 39 years ago
- Closed: 2014; 12 years ago
- Owner: Pier Mario Delrosso
- Head chef: Silverio Chavez
- Food type: Italian
- Location: 7 East 54th Street, New York City, New York, 10022, United States
- Coordinates: 40°45′40″N 73°58′28″W
- Reservations: Accepted
- Other information: Phone: 212-688-1999
- Website: bicenewyork.com

BiCE Ristorante (or known simply as BiCE) was an Italian restaurant located in New York City. Opening in 1987, the restaurant was popular with an upscale New York City clientele. It was described, soon after opening, by The New York Times as being "too chic, too crowded, too self-consciously European—yet everyone wants to visit." The restaurant almost closed in 2011 due to financial troubles. Crain's New York Business called BiCE an "institution". The original BiCE closed in 2014, but has since returned to New York City under the name BiCE Cucina.

== Background ==
BiCE was located in Midtown Manhattan and was founded, in 1987, by Roberto Ruggeri. Ruggeri was inspired by his mother's restaurant in Milan, Italy which was founded in 1926, where he worked with his brother, Remo Ruggeri. Both brothers are still involved in BiCE today. The restaurant is the same name as their mother's restaurant, which was also her nickname, short for Beatrice Mungai Ruggeri. The restaurant, and its international sister restaurants, suffered greatly due to the Great Recession. In 2011, the restaurant almost closed due to debt. It was bought out by a family friend in January 2011 and remained under the Ruggeri name. The restaurant had its interior updated and a restaurant manager and a marketing executive were hired. Famous customers included Bill Blass.

Their head chef was Silverio Chavez, who was born in Mexico.

BiCE closed permanently in 2014.

== Cuisine ==
In January 2013, BiCE added a prix fixe meal which cost patrons $2,013 to purchase, gratuity included, for the restaurants 25th anniversary. The meal comes with calamari, a veal dish, and the main dish, which is set on a Versace designed plate and consists of tagliolini, made in house, mushrooms, two pounds of lobster and black truffles. Chocolate mousse was served for dessert. Customers were given the Versace plate as a take home gift, which sold at the time at retail for $350. Gianni Versace used to dine at the Milan restaurant, and before his death in 1997, he created a chinaware design for the restaurant. 800 plates were created and as of January 2013, 45 remained. The meal was sold for a limited time, until February 15, 2013.

== See also ==
- Italian food
- List of Italian restaurants
