= Pierre Martin (politician) =

French politician (1943–2023)

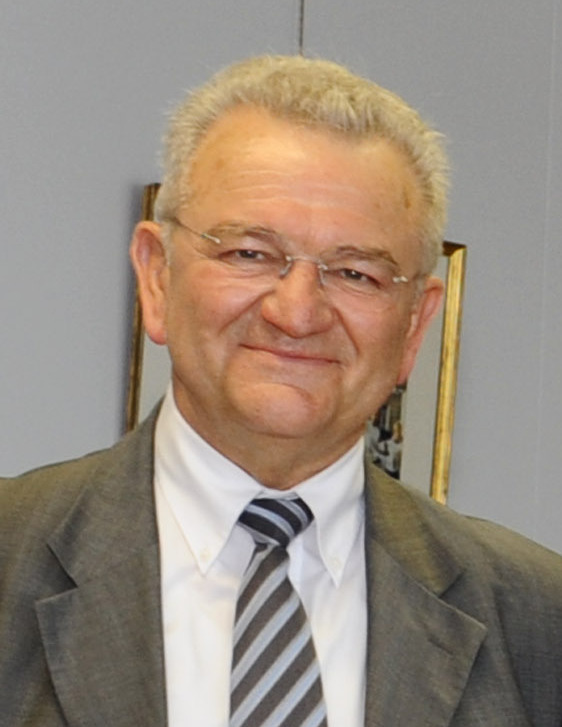
Pierre Martin in 2010

Pierre Martin (27 September 1943 in Moyenneville – 11 July 2023) was a French politician. A member of the Senate of France, he represented the Somme department. Martin was a member of the Union for a Popular Movement. He had initially been elected in 1995 and later re-elected in 2004 (later standing down in 2014).

Martin died on 11 July 2023, at the age of 79.
