= Josef Rodzinski =

German footballer

Personal information
- Full name: Josef Rodzinski
- Date of birth: 29 August 1907
- Place of birth: Hamborn, Duisburg, Germany
- Date of death: 1 December 1984 (aged 77)
- Place of death: West Germany
- Position: Midfielder

Senior career*
Years	Team	Apps	(Gls)
1928–1942	Hamborn 07		

International career
1936	Germany	3	(0)
- * Club domestic league appearances and goals

Josef Rodzinski (29 August 1907 – 1 December 1984) was a German footballer who played as a midfielder and made three appearances for the Germany national team.

== Career ==
Rodzinski made his international debut for Germany on 13 September 1936 in a friendly match against Poland, which finished as a 1–1 draw in Warsaw. He earned three caps in total for Germany, making his final appearance on 17 October 1936 in a friendly against the Irish Free State, which finished as a 2–5 loss in Dublin.

== Personal life ==
Rodzinski died on 1 December 1984 at the age of 77.

== Career statistics ==
=== International ===
Germany
Year	Apps	Goals
1936	3	0
Total	3	0
