= William Hay Taliaferro =

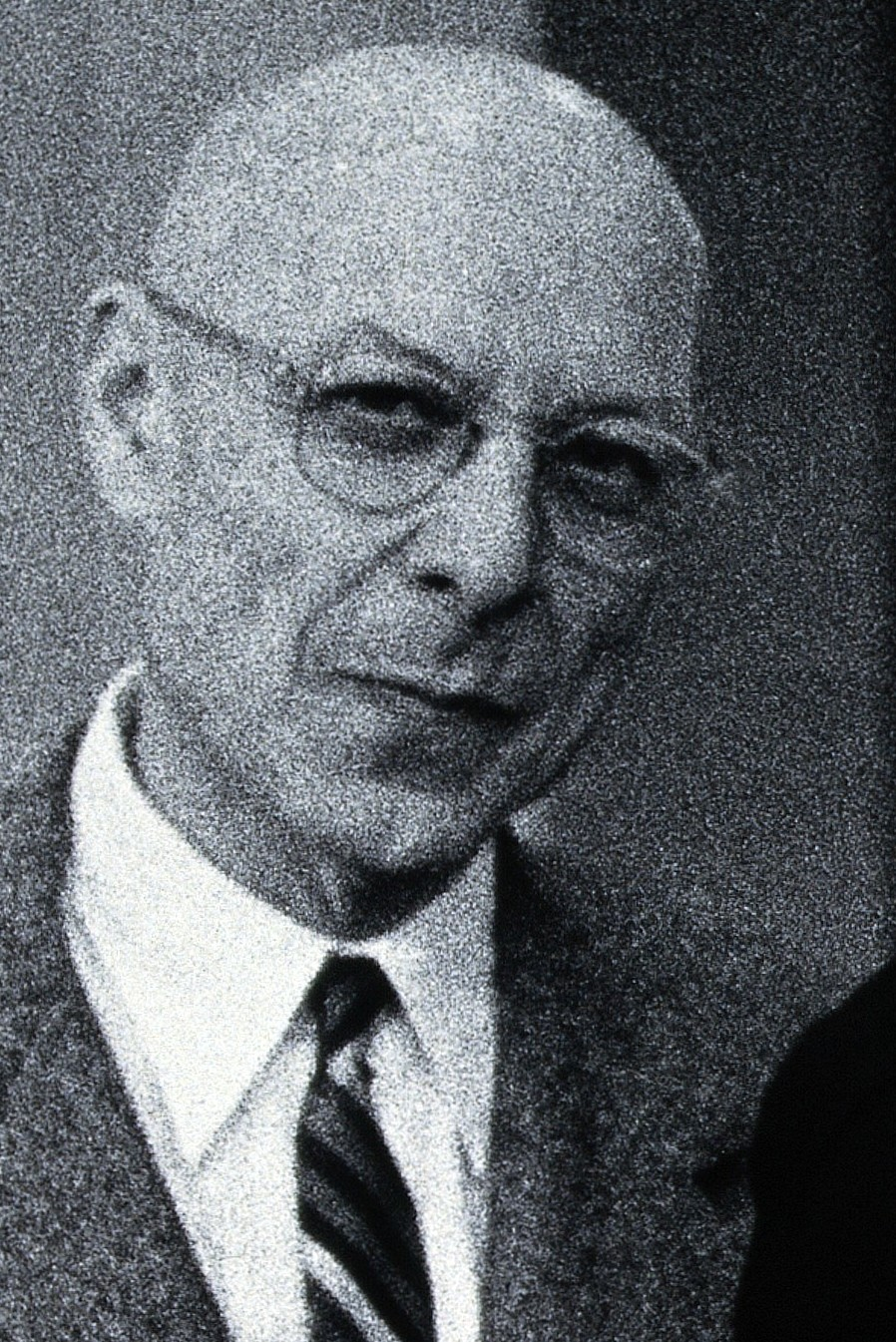
Image of William Hay Taliaferro

William Hay Taliaferro (1895–1973) was an American microbiologist and immunologist.

== Early life and education ==
William Hay Taliaferro was born on February 10, 1895 in Portsmouth, Virginia. He received his Bachelor of Science degree in 1915 from the University of Virginia, where at age 17 he published his first scientific paper with William Allison Kepner. Between 1917 and 1919, during his service in the U.S. Army, he conducted research on respiratory physiology and earned his Ph.D. in 1918 from Johns Hopkins University.

== Career ==
In 1919, Taliaferro joined the newly established School of Hygiene and Public Health at Johns Hopkins. He moved to the University of Chicago in 1924, serving for 36 years in various roles, including chairman of the Department of Microbiology, associate dean, dean of the Division of Biological Sciences, and editor of The Journal of Infectious Diseases. In 1939, he was appointed the Eliakim H. Moore Distinguished Service Professor. After retiring in 1960, he continued his research at Argonne National Laboratory.

== Research ==
Taliaferro's dissertation involved microsurgical studies on planaria, demonstrating that their primitive eye spots contain localized sensory areas that respond to light stimulation. This work contributed to later developments in understanding the physiology of insect eyes. From 1919 to about 1950, his research focused on humoral and cellular factors in host-parasite relationships, inspired by his 1929 book The Immunology of Parasitic Infections.

Taliaferro discovered the antibody ablastin in rats and mice, which inhibits the reproduction of certain trypanosomes, and demonstrating that the host's destruction of malarial parasites and the nematode Nippostrongylus is localized.

== Bibliography ==
- Immunity to Parasitic Diseases
- The Histopathology of Malaria
