= Sam Barrett =

Australian rules footballer, born 1905

Personal information
- Full name: Samuel David Barrett
- Born: 22 January 1905; Brunswick, Victoria
- Died: 21 December 1984 (aged 79); Traralgon, Victoria
- Original teams: Yarragon, Maffra
- Height: 183 cm (6 ft 0 in)
- Weight: 81 kg (179 lb)

Playing career^{1}
Years	Club	Games (Goals)
1925	Richmond	3 (1)
- ^{1} Playing statistics correct to the end of 1925.

Samuel David Barrett (22 January 1905 – 21 December 1984) was an Australian rules footballer who played for the Richmond Football Club in the Victorian Football League (VFL).
