= Henryk Sawistowski =

Polish academic

Henryk Sawistowski (11 February 1925 – 19 December 1984) was a Polish-born British academic.

He was born in 1925 in Grudziądz, Poland.

Sawistowski started his education in Grudziądz, during World War II while in military service. After the war he moved to London, England.

In 1974, after earning a diploma he became a lecturer at his school - the Imperial College London gradually rising the ranks to vice-president of Institution of Chemical Engineers in 1981 and dean of City and Guilds college until his death in 1984.
