= Ludwig Semrad =

Austrian righteous

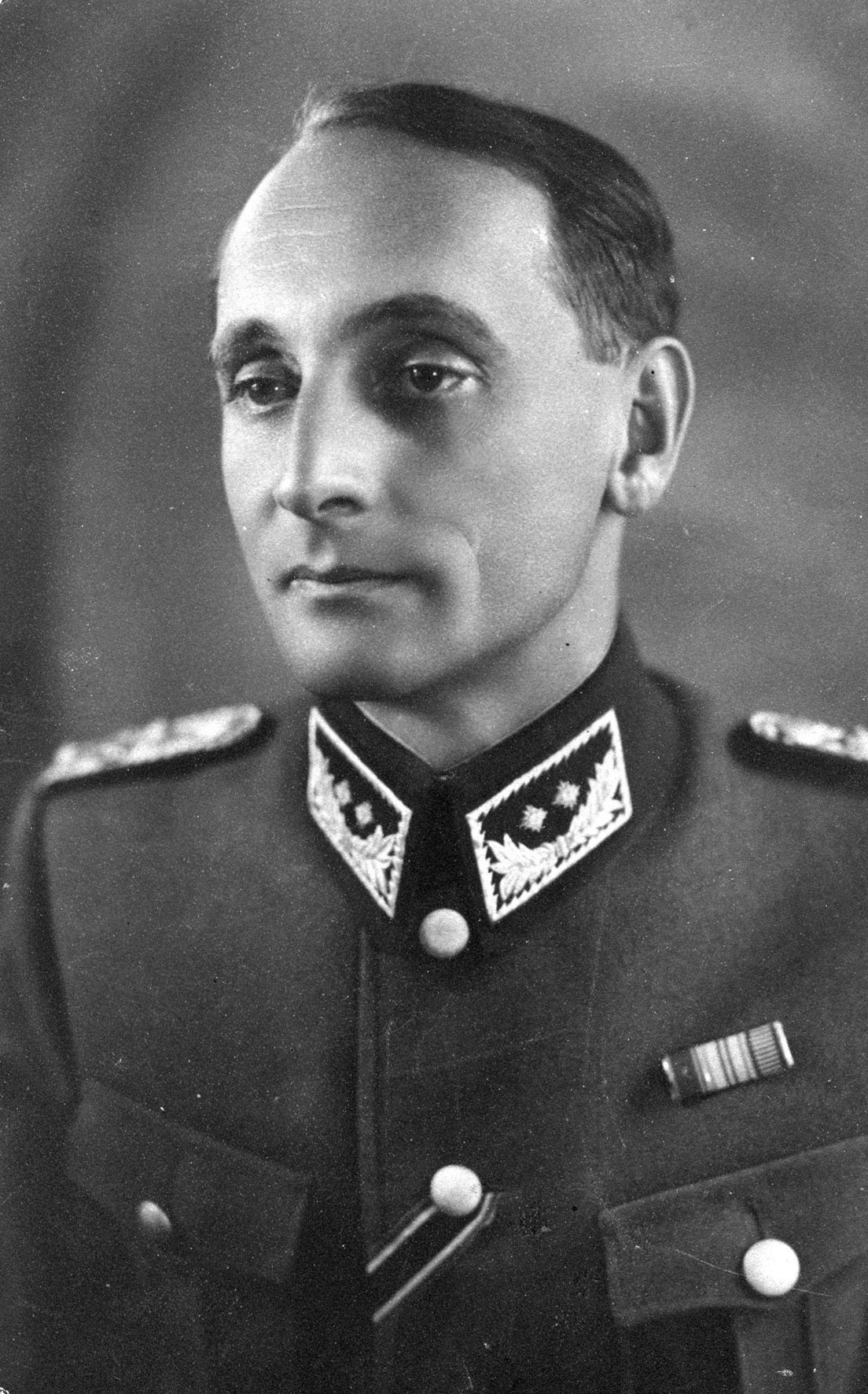
Ludwig Semrad in German uniform.

Ludwig Semrad (1907 – 12 December 1984) was an Austrian Righteous Among the Nations since 1979.

In 1941, he became head of a Polish cigarette factory, which was confiscated from Jews. There he left the management of the factory Wolkowitz to the Jewish director. He tried to employ as many Jews as possible to protect them from deportation to various Nazi concentration camps.

His wife Wanda Semrad is also an Austrian Righteous Among the Nations.
