= Wendell D. Mansfield =

American athlete and coach (1899–1984)

Biographical details
- Born: March 14, 1899; New Haven, Connecticut, U.S.
- Died: December 28, 1984 (aged 85); Springfield, Massachusetts, U.S.

Coaching career (HC unless noted)

Football
- 1925–1930: Winchester HS (MA)
- 1932–1936: Winchester HS (MA)
- 1937–1938: Springfield (backfield)
- 1939–1940: Bates
- 1941–1942: Springfield
- 1945–1957: Pomfret School (CT)

Basketball
- 1925–1931: Winchester HS (MA)
- 1932–1937: Winchester HS (MA)
- 1937–1939: Springfield (freshmen)
- 1940–1941: Bates
- 1942–1943: Springfield

Baseball
- 1926–1931: Winchester HS (MA)
- 1933–1937: Winchester HS (MA)
- 1940–1941: Bates

Administrative career (AD unless noted)
- 1925–1931: Winchester HS (MA)
- 1932–1937: Winchester HS (MA)
- 1945–1962: Pomfret School (CT)

Head coaching record
- Overall: 8–21–1 (college football)

Wendell Doolittle "Manny" Mansfield (March 14, 1899 – December 28, 1984) was an American coach who was the head football coach at Bates College and Springfield College.

== Early life ==
A native of New Haven, Connecticut, Mansfield lettered in football, basketball, baseball, swimming, and track at New Haven High School. He then attended the Springfield YMCA College (now Springfield College), where he played football and basketball, spent a year on the swim team, was a student instructor in multiple subjects, was an American Red Cross examiner, and managed the student council. He was also a scoutmaster for three years and managed Camp Anaming in Wheeling, West Virginia and Camp Sequassen in New Haven.

== Coaching ==
In 1925, Mansfield was named athletic director and football, basketball, baseball coach at Winchester High School in Winchester, Massachusetts. He took a year's sabbatical during the 1931–32 school year to earn his master's degree from New York University. As head football coach, Mansfield had a .780 winning percentage and won three Mystic Valley League championships before transferring to the Middlesex League. His basketball teams won three Middlesex League titles and his baseball teams won 53% of its games.

In 1937, Mansfield returned to Springfield College as an assistant football coach. He was the backfield coach and chief scout under Paul Stagg until 1939, when he became the head football coach at Bates College. In 1940, he became the school's baseball and basketball coach as well. In 1941, he returned to Springfield College as head football coach. In 1942, he succeeded the retiring Edward J. Hickox as Springfield's head basketball coach.

From 1945 to 1962, Mansfield was the athletic director at the Pomfret School in Pomfret, Connecticut. He also coached the school's football and basketball teams.

== Head coaching record ==
=== College football ===
Year	Team	Overall	Conference	Standing	Bowl/playoffs
Bates Bobcats (Maine Intercollegiate Athletic Association) (1939–1940)
1939	Bates	4–3			
1940	Bates	3–4			
Bates:		7–7			
Springfield Gymnasts (Independent) (1941–1942)
1941	Springfield	0–7–1			
1942	Springfield	1–7			
Springfield:		1–14–1			
Total:		8–21–1			
