= Vivian Granger =

South African soccer administrator (1919–1984)

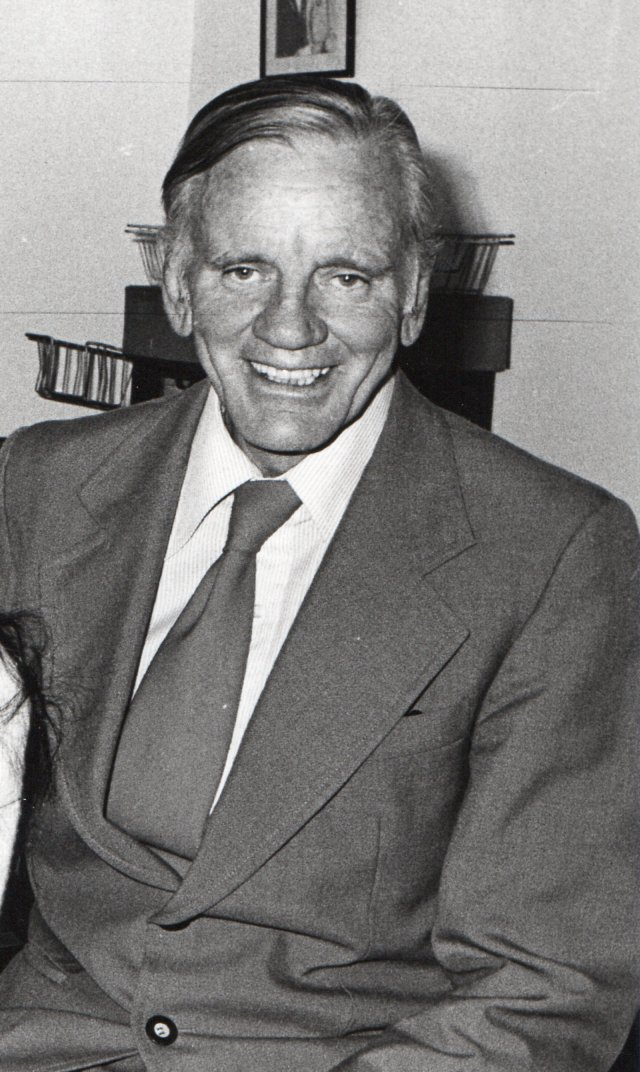
- Granger in 1977
- Born: 27 May 1919
- Died: 14 December 1984 (aged 65)
- Spouse: Shirley Margaret (nee Williams) (m. 1962; div. 1971) Phillis Ethel (nee Burton) (div)
- Children: Dale, Sandra, Kelly, Verity, Megan
- Parent: John Leslie Granger (father) Mary Catherine Drum (mother)

Vivian Hector Granger (27 May 1919 – 14 December 1984) was a soccer administrator and the dynamic driving force behind the creation of professional soccer in South Africa in 1959. He played a critical role in bringing about multiracial soccer in the country in 1978.

== Early years ==
Granger’s mother, Mary Catherine Drum, was born in Enniskillen, Northern Ireland. She married Patrick Kennedy, an Anglo-Boer War veteran, and they had three sons. Having emigrated to South Africa as a family, Patrick Kennedy, a sergeant major in the South African army, died in action in East Africa in World War I. Mary then married John Leslie Granger and in this family, Vivian Granger was one of five siblings, all boys except one sister. Granger and John (Jack) Kennedy (from Mary’s first marriage) became very close having served together in World War II in the North African Theatre of El-Alamein, Egypt and worked together in the South African soccer administration. Jack was agent to the Natal (province) soccer wing of the National Football League (South Africa) (NFL). John Leslie Granger was a politician who worked for the Durban City council.

The boys were all very sporty and grew up in Durban opposite a green where they spent hours playing soccer and cricket. A media natural from the start, Granger could often be found practicing his sports commentary, especially cricket. He did later meet the iconic Charles Fortune, who gave him some pointers and good advice. Granger played for the First XI for Glenwood High School.

== Soccer administration ==
Referred to as "Mr Professional Football", Granger felt that the time was ripe for professional soccer to be introduced in South Africa. Along with Dave Marais and Lubbe Snoyman, they convinced the South African soccer world that the game was ready to go professional. In mid-1959, The National Football League (South Africa) was introduced where Granger became the General Manager. The immediate success of professional soccer drew the visits of many overseas teams, most notably Real Madrid in 1964.

Granger was also instrumental in getting the Black-only National Professional Soccer League (South Africa) or NPSL launched in 1970. He worked side by side with the head of the NPSL, George Thabe. Separate leagues were held based on the Apartheid legislation which was in force at that time. Granger also played a major role in pleading the case for membership to the world body FIFA. In 1976, a multiracial South African XI played an Argentinian Invitation team. It was Granger who said that there was no specific law preventing white teams from fielding black players and in 1977 Arcadia Shepherds F.C. became the first professional soccer team to field a black player in Vincent Julius.

Granger authored The World Game Comes to South Africa (Publisher Howard Timmins, 1961). He was also a published sports cartoonist.
