= Ching-Yuen Hsiao =

American diplomat and engineer

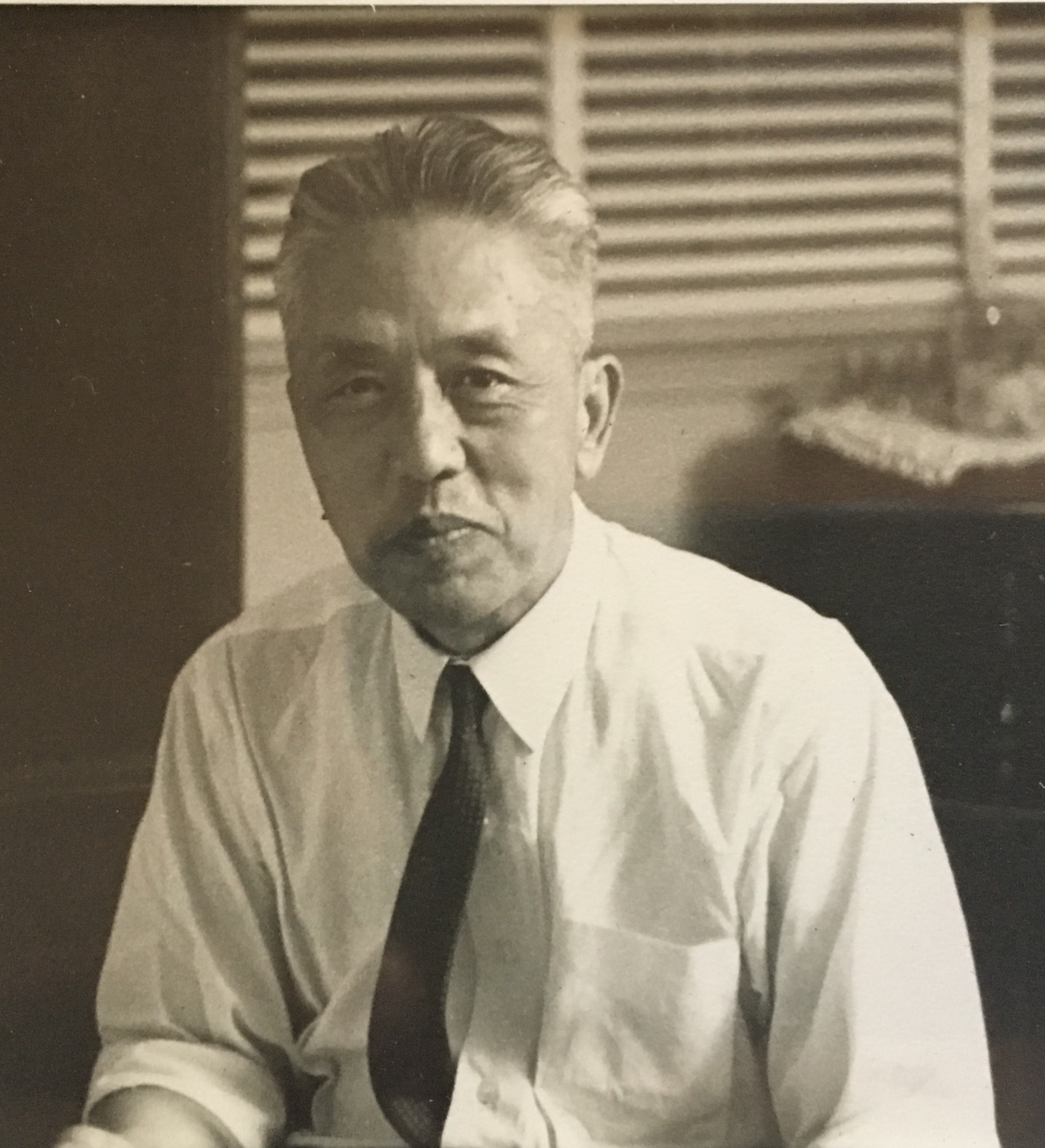
- Born: 蕭慶雲; 28 March 1900; Guizhou, China
- Died: 18 December 1984 (aged 84); Silver Spring, Maryland, USA
- Occupations: Chinese diplomat, UN delegate
- Awards: Medal of Freedom (1946)

Ching-Yuen Hsiao (Chinese: 蕭慶雲; born Guizhou, China, 28 March 1900 – 18 December 1984, Silver Spring, Maryland, USA) was a Chinese-born American diplomat and engineer who received the Medal of Freedom from President Harry Truman in 1946 for his meritorious contribution to the Allied cause in the war against Japan.

== Personal life and education ==
Hsiao was born on March 28, 1900 (second month, 28th day of the lunar calendar), in Kaiyang, Guizhou province, China. He grew up in Shangtian, Jiangxi. He was in one of the early (1924) graduating classes of Tsinghua College, Beijing, which had been established as a preparatory school for students the government planned to send to the United States. He earned the following degrees:

- B.S. Civil Engineering (with honors), 1926, California Institute of Technology,
- M.S. Sanitary and Municipal Engineering, 1927 Harvard University
- Sc.D. Sanitary Engineering, 1930 Harvard University

After completing his doctorate, he received a Rockefeller Foundation fellowship and travelled to Europe to study sanitation systems in major cities.

He returned to China in 1930 to serve his country in the field of his training: transportation, public works and communication.

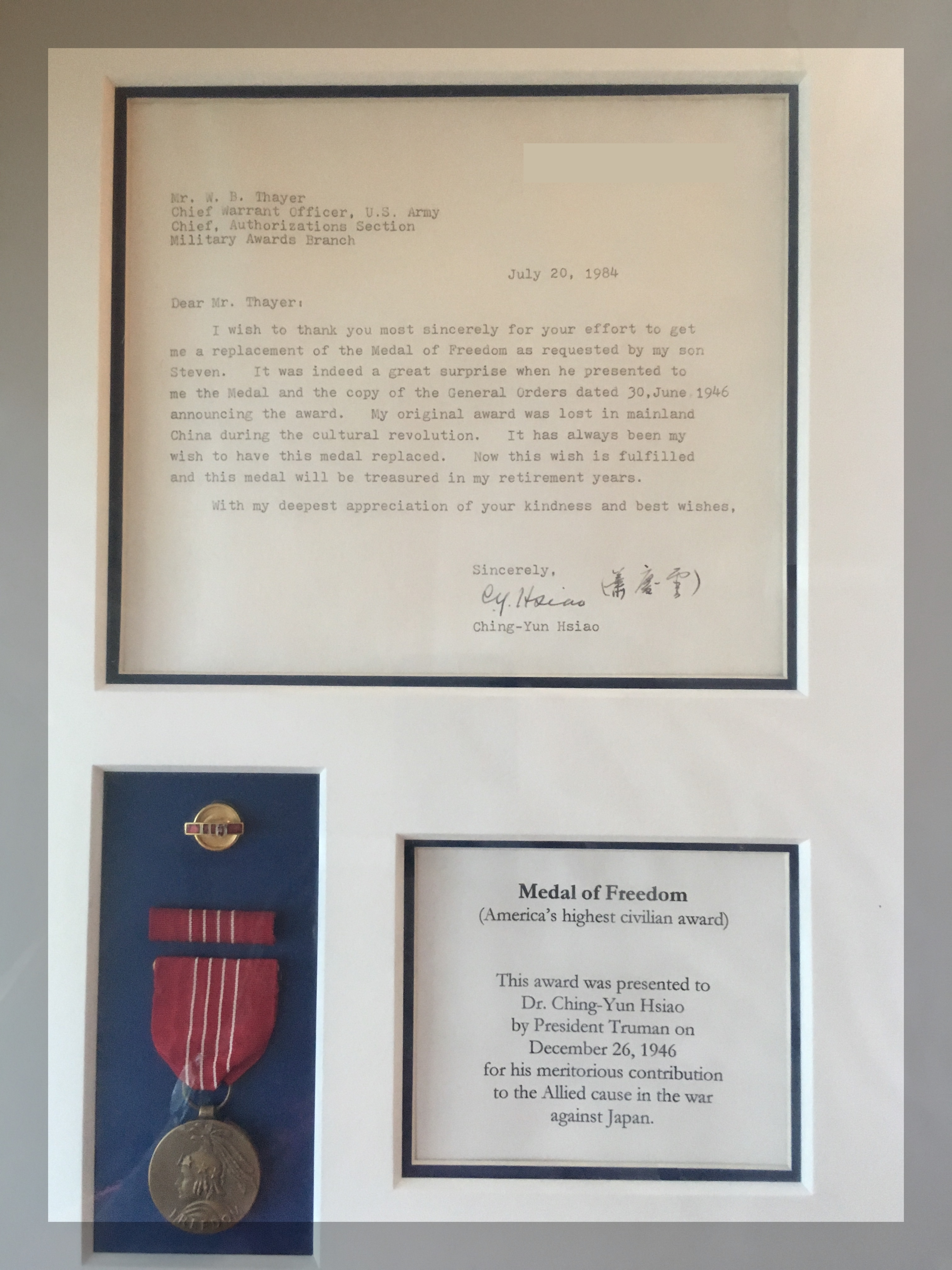
Medal of Freedom to replace original lost during the Cultural Revolution, with thank you letter from CY Hsiao

== Notable service ==
Upon his return to China, he worked for the Shanghai municipal government and later with the Ministry of Communications of the Republic of China. In Shanghai, he was in charge of Municipal Engineering Public Works and modernized the sewer system for Shanghai. With the ministry, he was initially director of the Jiangxi Highway Bureau, then director of the South-West Highway Administration, and finally director of the National Highway Administration. He was in charge of building the great southwestern highway system. He was also in charge of the Burma Road and the strategic highway between Xinjiang and Russia. As director of the National Highway Administration after the Second Sino-Japanese War, he was responsible for relocating thousands of refugees and governmental officials from Chongqing to Nanjing safely.

Hsiao was awarded the Medal of Freedom (America's highest civilian award) by President Truman on December 26, 1946, for his meritorious contribution to the Allied cause in the war against Japan.

In the spring of 1947 he was dispatched to the United Nations as Delegate for China on the United Nations Transportation and Communication Commission, where he served from 1947 to 1957. Concurrently, he served as the director of the Ministry of Transportation (sometimes called the Division of Communications based on an early incorrect translation from Chinese) under the Chinese Government Purchasing Mission, first in Canada and later in the United States (1952–1969). He settled in Washington, DC, in 1949.
