= Percy Bice =

Australian rules footballer, born 1915

Personal information
- Full name: Percy John Bice
- Born: 21 September 1915; Prospect, South Australia
- Died: 24 November 1985 (aged 70)
- Original team: Norwood
- Height: 173 cm (5 ft 8 in)
- Weight: 66 kg (146 lb)

Playing career^{1}
Years	Club	Games (Goals)
1944	Richmond	6 (0)
- ^{1} Playing statistics correct to the end of 1944.

Percy John Bice (21 September 1915 – 24 November 1985) was a former Australian rules footballer who played with Richmond in the Victorian Football League (VFL).

Percy was married and lived in South Australia when he enlisted in the army on 16 April 1941. He worked as a representative for the Shell Oil Company of Australia. His trade group in the army was Ordnance Stores. He served overseas in New Guinea from 8 March 1943 to 29 November 1943. His continuous fulltime war service was from 30 April 1941 to 2 October 1945.

While undergoing military training, Bice had signed with South Melbourne, but he was cleared to join the Tigers, and went into the senior squad for his debut without playing a Reserves, U19s, or even a practice match with the club. Bice's VFL career ended after only 6 games when he was transferred with his military unit.
