= Marcel Deneux =

French politician (1928–2026)

Marcel Deneux (16 August 1928 – 13 July 2026) was a French politician who was a member of the Senate of France. He represented the Somme department from 1995 to 2014 and was a member of the Union for French Democracy Party. Deneux died on 13 July 2026, at the age of 97.

== Sources ==
- Page on the Senate website (in French)
