= Satya Churn Law =

Indian naturalist, educationist and intellectual

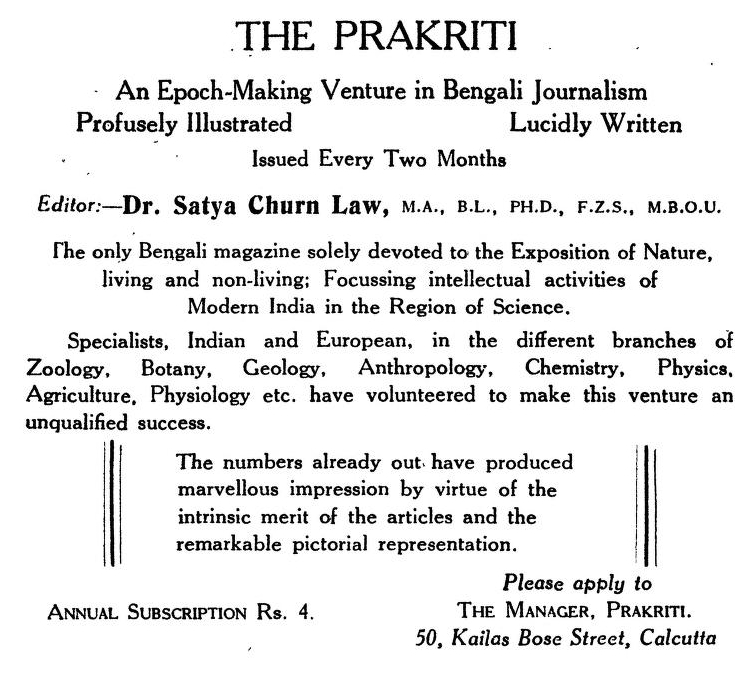
1938 advertisement for Prakriti

Satya Churn Law (also transcribed as Satya Charan Law or in Bengali Satyacharan Laha) (1888 – 11 December 1984) was a wealthy naturalist, amateur ornithologist, educationist and intellectual in Calcutta.Law was born to Ambikacharan Laha and Kiranbala Devi at their home on Kailash Bose Street in Calcutta. He was educated at Metropolitan College, and at Presidency College, obtaining a master's degree in history. He then obtained a law degree. He had an interest in bird from an early age and began to keep them and observe them in captivity. He was for a while a treasurer of the Indian Statistical Institute. He established an aviary at this home in Agarpada, near Calcutta in 1926. He was elected Fellow of the Zoological Society of London and Member of the British Ornithologists' Union. In 1937, Nirad C. Chaudhuri became his literary assistant. Law was a council member in the Calcutta corporation and served as a sheriff in 1937. Chaudhuri worked from March 1937 to March 1942. During this time he found that Law was a lonely man who began to write up his ornithological work to overcome his wife's death. He had an aviary in Calcutta and one in Darjeeling which was managed by a caretaker. His villa in Calcutta was often rumored to house a Jewish mistress which Chaudhuri and his wife found amusing. He also kept several dogs including Pekinese and Airedale breeds. Law had already written books on a variety of topics including birds (Pet Birds of Bengal 1923) based on his experience in keeping aviaries. He was a vice president of the Calcutta Zoological Garden for a while. He founded, in 1924, a journal, Prakriti, in Bengali for the popularization of natural science.
