= Solange Lamblin =

French politician

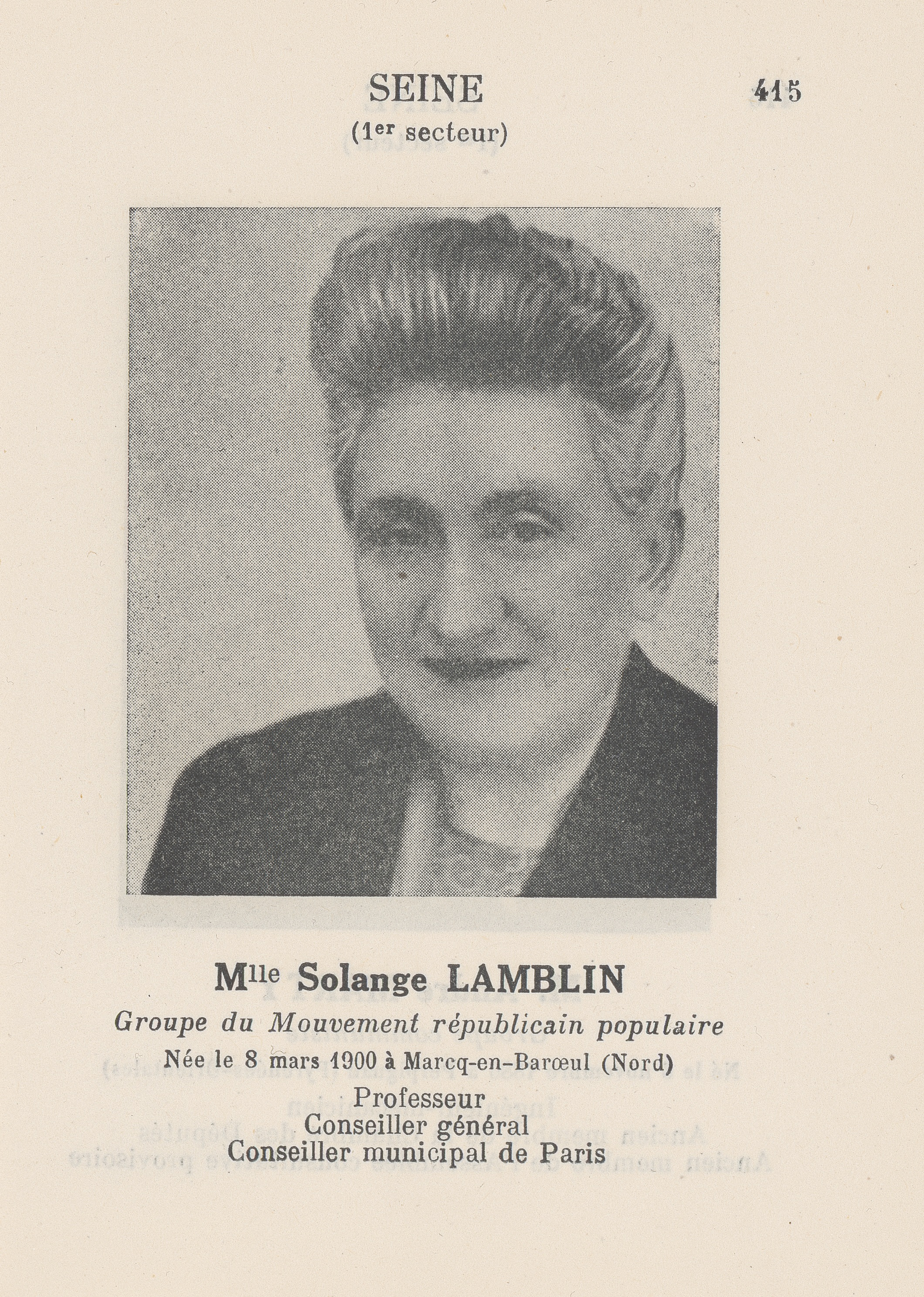

Member of the National Assembly
- In office 1946–1951
- In office 1945–1946
- Constituency: Seine

Personal details
- Born: 8 March 1900 Marcq-en-Barœul, France
- Died: 8 December 1984 (aged 84) Champcueil, France
- Party: Popular Republican Movement

Solange Lamblin (8 March 1900 – 8 December 1984) was a French politician. She was elected to the National Assembly in 1945 as one of the first group of French women in parliament. Although she lost her seat in the June 1946 elections, she regained it in the November 1946 elections, serving until 1951.

== Biography ==
Lamblin was born in Marcq-en-Barœul in 1900; her father was a tailor and her mother a grocer. She attended secondary school in Tourcoing, before studying English at the University of Lille. She subsequently worked as a teacher in high school and university.

In the 1930s, she joined the women's section of the Popular Democratic Party, and later became a member of the Popular Republican Movement (MPR). She was an MPR candidate in Seine department in the 1945 National Assembly elections. The fourth-placed candidate on the MPR list, she was elected to parliament, becoming one of the first group of women in the National Assembly. After entering parliament she joined the Commission for National Education and Fine Arts, Youth, Sports and Leisure and tabled a bill for rehousing evicted tenants.

Although she lost her seat in the June 1946 elections, she regained it in the November 1946 elections after being placed third on the MPR list. During her second term she was a member of the National Education Commission and the Press Commission. While a member of the National Assembly, she also served as a local councillor in Paris.

She did not run for re-election in 1951, stating that she would prefer to return to teaching in university. She died in 1984.
