= Murder of Traci Hammerberg =

1984 killing of an 18-year-old American

Traci Hammerberg

Traci Lynn Hammerberg (March 7, 1966 – December 15, 1984) was an 18-year-old American who was killed on December 15, 1984. Her murderer was identified in 2019 through forensic genealogy.

== Background ==
Traci Lynn Hammerberg was born March 7, 1966, to Judy Klabunde and Harlan Hammerberg in Milwaukee. The family moved to Saukville, Wisconsin c. 1976 where Hammerberg had attended Port Washington High School. According to Ozaukee County Sheriff James Johnson, on the night of the murder, Hammerberg left a house in Saukville where she was babysitting to walk to a grocery store to meet with friends. They drove to Quade's Tavern in Port Washington. She told the bartender she was going to a party in Grafton. According to the report, Hammerberg and her friends played a beer drinking game and smoked marijuana at the party. She left to walk home around 12:30 a.m. The walk was 3.7 miles along Wisconsin Highway 33. She was raped, strangled, and died of head injuries. Her body was dumped on a snowy driveway on Maple Road in Grafton. Hammerberg's partially clothed body was discovered by Dan Sieracki early on Saturday.

== Investigation ==
It was not immediately clear to the Ozaukee County Police Department if she had been killed on site or her body moved there. Authorities could not identify what had inflicted the head injuries and stated it could have been anything "from a stick to a baseball bat." The object was later identified as metallic. Neighbors in the wooded area north of Grafton did not see or hear anything unusual. Two different hunters reported seeing a car speeding away from Maple Road without headlights. The investigation was led by the Ozaukee County Sheriff's office. They received support from the Wisconsin Department of Justice and the division of criminal investigation. A Behavioral Analysis Unit assisted with creating a criminal profile. The Sheriff's office interviewed hundreds of witnesses. More than 400 men were eliminated as suspects through blood typing and DNA analysis.

A year later, Wendy Smith, a friend and former classmate of Hammerberg was found dead. Her death was ruled a homicide while her cause of death was investigated.

Hammerberg's murderer was later identified through forensic genealogy to be Philip Cross, a Wisconsin man who died in 2012 of a drug overdose. Police built a DNA profile of her alleged killer using blood from underneath her fingernails and semen recovered at the scene. The police had begun searching genealogy databases in March 2019. They later identified Cross though a second cousin. The police reached out to the Los Angeles Federal Bureau of Investigation (FBI) team that solved the Golden State Killer case for their expertise with forensic genealogy technology.
