= Alfred Andrew-Street =

Australian sportsman

Personal information
- Full name: Alfred Gordon Andrew-Street
- Born: 8 April 1914; Bondi, New South Wales
- Died: 13 December 1984 (aged 70); Concord, New South Wales
- Original team: Collingwood Tech
- Height: 174 cm (5 ft 9 in)

Playing career^{1}
Years	Club	Games (Goals)
1933–1934	Collingwood	6 (0)
- ^{1} Playing statistics correct to the end of 1934.

Alfred Gordon Andrew-Street (8 April 1914 – 13 December 1984), known to close friends as 'Andy', was an Australian sportsman who played first-class cricket for Victoria and Australian rules football in the Victorian Football League (VFL) with Collingwood.

Andrew-Street was a captain and life member of Collingwood Cricket Club. Born in Bondi, Sydney, he played a total of six VFL games at Collingwood, five in 1933 and the other in 1934. His only first-class cricket game came in 1937–38 against Tasmania at the Melbourne Cricket Ground where he opened the batting in both innings, making 21 and 16. His sporting career was cut short by service in the RAAF in World War II where he served as a pilot and flight instructor, largely in New Guinea. At age three, 'Andy' had lost his own father to World War I's Western Front at Ypres. Alfred Gordon Andrew took on his step-father's surname and went on to be educated at Trinity Grammar, Melbourne.

After a life in sales that took him and his family to three states, and having spent the last 26 years of his life in Balgowlah, he died in Sydney.

== See also ==
- List of Victoria first-class cricketers
