= Petro Kozak =

Ukrainian Greek Catholic bishop (1911–1984)

- Ukrainian Catholic Archeparchy of Lviv (auxiliary)
- Church: Ukrainian Greek Catholic Church
- Appointed: 1983

Orders
- Ordination: 25 July 1937 (Priest) by Bl. Nicholas Charnetsky
- Consecration: 1983 (Bishop) by Volodymyr Sterniuk

Personal details
- Born: Petro Kozak; 4 April 1911 Loshniv, Austrian-Hungarian Empire, now Ukraine
- Died: 9 December 1984 (aged 73) Vodyane, Soviet Union, now Zymna Voda, Ukraine

Petro Kozak, C.Ss.R. (Ukrainian: Петро Козак; 4 April 1911 – 9 December 1984) was a Ukrainian Greek Catholic clandestine hierarch. He was an auxiliary bishop of the Ukrainian Catholic Archeparchy of Lviv from 1983 to 1984.

Born in Loshniv, Austro-Hungarian Empire (present-day – Ternopil Oblast, Ukraine) in 1911 and in 1931 joined the missionary Congregation of the Most Holy Redeemer. He was professed on 26 June 1932, solemn professed on 21 September 1935 and was ordained a priest on 25 July 1937 by Blessed Bishop Nicholas Charnetsky, C.Ss.R. during his studies in Belgium. He was imprisoned in May 1950, because the Communist regime abolished the Greek-Catholic Church, and exiled to Siberia. Released from prison in October 1960 and clandestinely continued to serve as priest.

On 1983 Fr. Kozak was consecrated to the Episcopate as auxiliary bishop. The principal and single consecrator was clandestine archbishop Volodymyr Sterniuk.

He died on 9 December 1984.
