= Rollie Culver =

American jazz musician

- Birth name: Rolland Pierce Culver
- Born: October 29, 1908; Fond du Lac, Wisconsin, U.S.
- Died: December 8, 1984 (aged 76); Culver City, California, U.S.
- Genres: Jazz
- Instrument: Drums

Rolland Pierce "Rollie" Culver (October 29, 1908 – December 8, 1984) was an American jazz drummer.

== Career ==
Culver's first entry into professional entertainment was as a tap dancer, but he concentrated on drumming after 1930. He played in the territory band of Heinie Beau for most of the 1930s, then, in 1941, began playing with Red Nichols. He drummed behind Nichols for more than twenty years, working with him right up to Nichols's death. Other associations include work with Jack Delaney and Raymond Burke, and as a session musician for film soundtracks.
