= Raymond Smith (South African cricketer) =

South African cricketer (1923–1984)

Personal information
- Full name: Raymond Douglas Smith
- Born: 1 April 1923; Bloemfontein, Orange Free State, South Africa
- Died: 25 December 1984 (aged 61); Benoni, Gauteng, South Africa
- Batting: Right-handed
- Role: Wicket-keeper

Domestic team information
- Years: Team
- 1949-50 to 1956-57: North Eastern Transvaal

Career statistics
Competition	First-class
Matches	14
Runs scored	287
Batting average	14.35
100s/50s	0/0
Top score	49
Balls bowled	0
Wickets	–
Bowling average	–
5 wickets in innings	–
10 wickets in match	–
Best bowling	–
Catches/stumpings	31/2
- Source: Cricinfo, 25 March 2020

Raymond Douglas Smith (1 April 1923 – 25 December 1984) was a South African cricketer who played first-class cricket for North Eastern Transvaal from 1950 to 1956.

A wicket-keeper and tail-end batsman, Smith was North Eastern Transvaal's regular wicket-keeper in the 1951–52, 1952–53 and 1953–54 seasons. He made his highest score of 49 batting at number nine against Orange Free State in 1951–52, when he was North Eastern Transvaal's top-scorer.

Smith died in Benoni, Gauteng on 25 December 1984, at the age of 61.
