= Daniel Dubois (politician) =

French politician (born 1952)

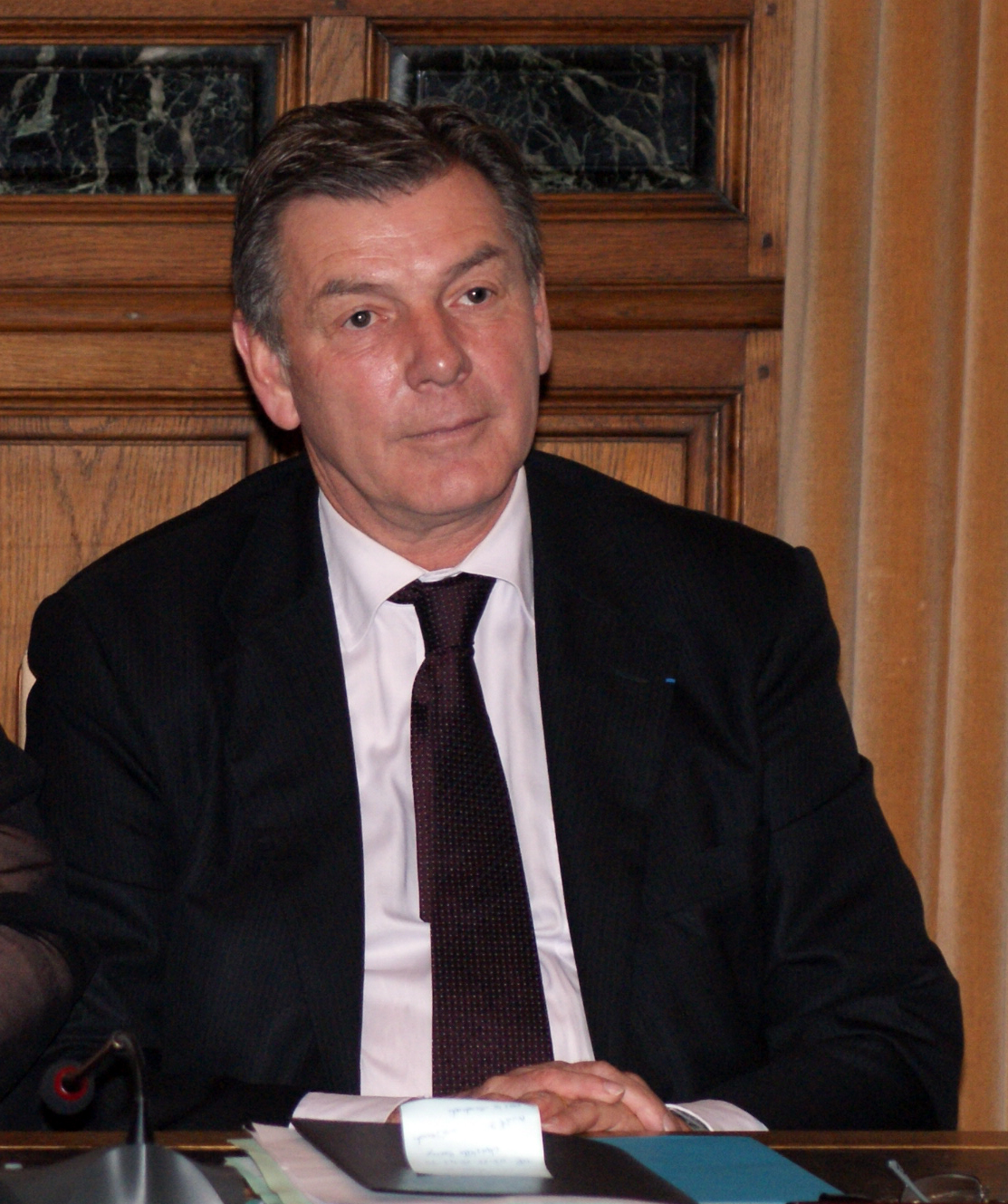
Daniel Dubois

Daniel Dubois (born 5 February 1952) is a French politician and a former member of the Senate of France. He represented the Somme department from 2004 to 2020 as a member of the Union for French Democracy Party.
