= David F. Bice =

United States Marine Corps general

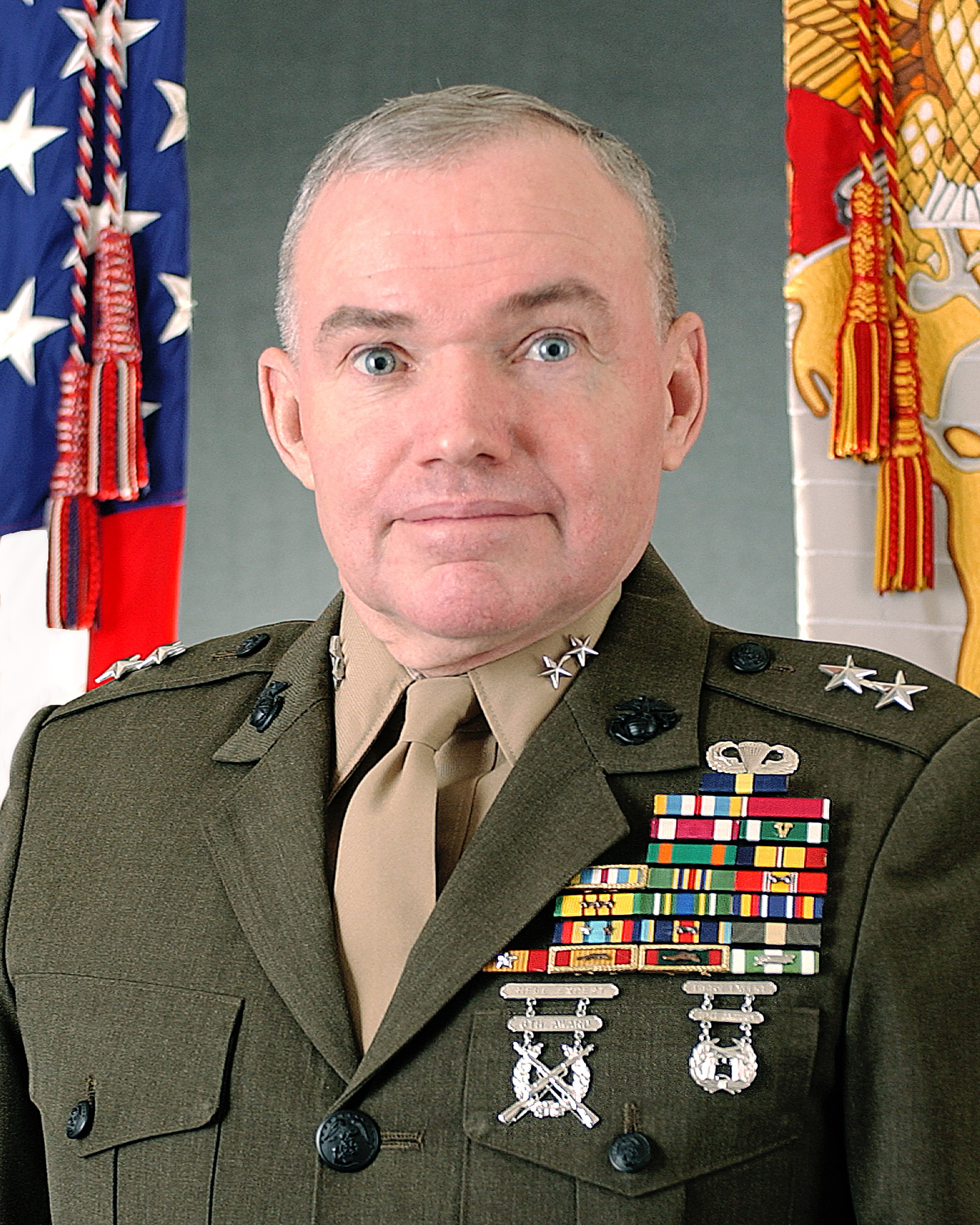
- Major General David F. Bice
- Born: September 9, 1945; Zanesville, Ohio, U.S.
- Military career
- Allegiance: United States of America
- Branch: United States Marine Corps
- Service years: 1968-2002, 2004-2007
- Rank: Major General
- Commands: 3rd Battalion 8th Marines; 9th Marines; 3rd Marine Division; Marine Corps Base Camp Pendleton; Inspector General, USMC
- Conflicts: Vietnam War
- Awards: Distinguished Service Medal; Defense Superior Service Medal; Legion of Merit

Major General David F. Bice is a retired Inspector General of the United States Marine Corps, formerly stationed in Washington, D.C. Bice retired from active duty in 2007 after over 36 years of service.

== Biography ==
David Bice was born on September 9, 1945, in Zanesville, Ohio, and enlisted in the Marine Corps in June 1968. He attended recruit training at Marine Corps Recruit Depot San Diego. He was commissioned through the Enlisted Commissioning Program in April 1969. He received his bachelor's degree from Pepperdine University, and he holds a master's degree in business from Central Michigan University. His formal military education includes the Infantry Officer Advanced Course at Fort Benning, Georgia, and the National War College, where he studied as a senior research fellow.

Bice has commanded Marines at every level from platoon to division. He served as a rifle platoon commander with 3rd Battalion, 1st Marines, 1st Marine Division in the Republic of Vietnam. He led companies in: 1st Battalion, 4th Marines, 3rd Marine Division; 3rd Battalion, 7th Marines, 1st Marine Division and 1st Tank Battalion, 1st Marine Division.

During 1986-1988, he commanded 3rd Battalion, 8th Marines, 2nd Marine Division. He commanded the 9th Marine Regiment from 1992 to 1994. He commanded the 3rd Marine Division in Okinawa, Japan, from 1994 to 1995.

From 1999-2001 he served as deputy commander of Marine Forces Europe. His assignments outside the Fleet Marine Forces have included series commander of Marine Corps Recruit Depot, Parris Island, South Carolina; enlisted promotions plans officer, Manpower Dept., HQMC; chief of European Division, J-5, The Joint Staff; commanding general of Marine Corps Base Hawaii; director of Marine Corps Staff, HQMC; deputy commander of NATO Joint Headquarters South Center, Larissa, Greece (the base closed in 2004); and commanding general of Marine Corps Base, Camp Pendleton, California.

Bice also served as an exchange officer with the Royal Marines (RM) and is a graduate of the Royal Marines Commando Course. He left the Marine Corps in 2002 after serving as the commanding general of Camp Pendleton (ironically this is the camp where he started his military career) to work as an international defense consultant. He returned to active duty in August 2004 in support of the Global War on Terrorism, serving as the Inspector General of the Marine Corps.

He returned to retired status in 2007 after over 36 years of active service.

== Awards and decorations ==
His personal decorations include:

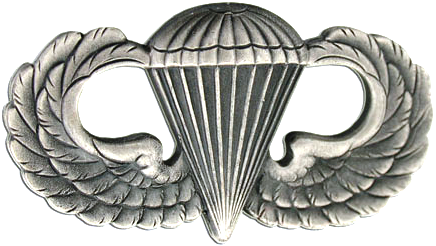

Basic Parachutist Badge
| 1st Row | Navy Distinguished Service Medal | Defense Superior Service Medal | Legion of Merit | Meritorious Service Medal |
| 2nd Row | Navy and Marine Corps Commendation Medal w/ valor device | Navy and Marine Corps Achievement Medal | Combat Action Ribbon | Joint Meritorious Unit Award |
| 3rd Row | Navy Meritorious Unit Commendation | National Defense Service Medal w/ 2 service stars | Vietnam Service Medal w/ 3 service stars | Global War on Terrorism Service Medal |
| 4th Row | Korea Defense Service Medal | Navy Sea Service Deployment Ribbon w/ 6 service stars | Navy & Marine Corps Overseas Service Ribbon w/ 2 service stars | Marine Corps Drill Instructor Ribbon |
| 5th Row | Vietnam Gallantry Cross w/ silver star | Vietnam Gallantry Cross unit citation | Vietnam Civil Actions unit citation | Vietnam Campaign Medal |
