= Walther Hubatsch =

German historian (1915–1984)

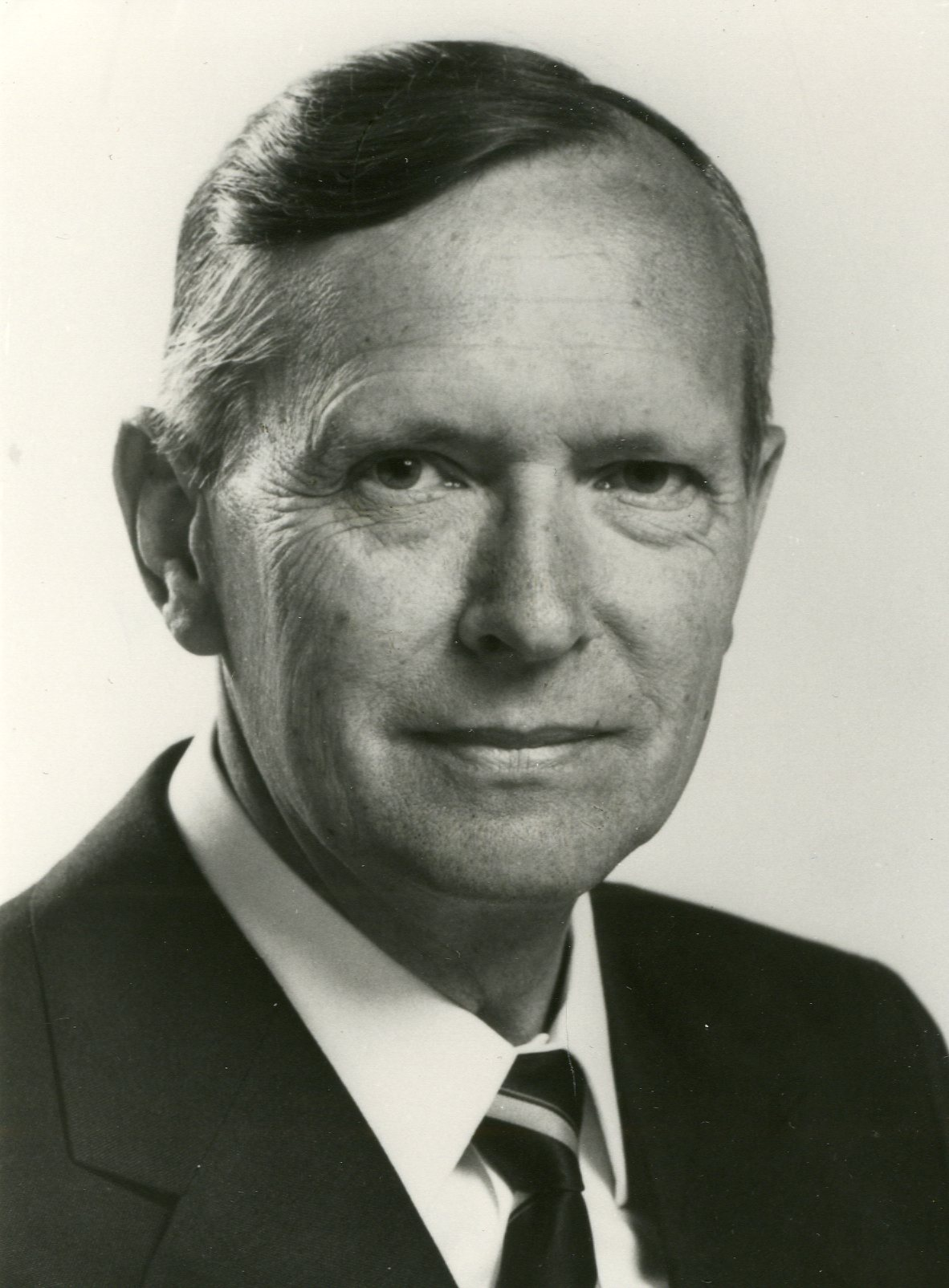
- Walther Hubatsch in 1974
- Born: 17 May 1915; Königsberg, East Prussia
- Died: 29 December 1984 (aged 69); Bonn , Germany
- Occupation: Military historian

Walther Hubatsch (17 May 1915 – 29 December 1984) was a German military historian.

He was born in Königsberg in East Prussia. During World War II he served in the German Army. He was appointed professor in Göttingen from 1949, and from 1956 at the University of Bonn. Among his works is a treatment of Operation Weserübung, the German attack on Denmark and Norway in 1940.
