= Sakubei Yamamoto =

Japanese coal miner and painter

- 山本作兵衛
- Born: 17 May 1892; Fukuoka Prefecture, Japan
- Died: 19 December 1984 (aged 92)
- Known for: Scenes of mining life in 20th century Japan
- Style: Sumi-e, watercolour, naïve art

Sakubei Yamamoto (山本作兵衛, 17 May 1892 – 19 December 1984) was a Japanese coal miner and artist. His sumi-e and watercolour work, which was heavily annotated, depicted the life he had experienced as a miner, and a collection of his paintings and diaries formed the first Japanese entry in the UNESCO Memory of the World Register, inscribed in 2011.

== Early life and mining ==
Yamamoto was born in a village in the Kama district (Kama-gun) of Fukuoka Prefecture, Japan, on 17 May 1892 (Meiji 25). The village is now part of the city of Iizuka while Kama is part of Kaho District. His father, Tarō Yamamoto, was a riverboat worker on the Onga River before becoming a miner in the Chikuhō coalfield. His mother was Shina Yamamoto.

From the age of 7 or 8, Yamamota helped his brother as a trammer moving mine carts and, aged 15, after a truncated apprenticeship, he began a career as a coal miner and metalsmith. Over the next 50 years he worked for 18 different mines and his last position was at the Ito Mine in Iikane-mura, Tagawa (also in Fukuoka Prefecture) where he worked from 1940 (Shōwa 15) until it shut down in 1955 (Shōwa 30).

== Art ==
"Underground Survey in the Mid-Meiji Era (1868-1912)", February 1965. This illustrates an annual survey called a kentori. A larger gallery is available at Y-Sakubei.com

Yamamoto had been interested in art since he was a young child and recalled repeatedly drawing a figure of Katō Kiyomasa (a famous 16th century daimyō) that his younger brother, then 8, received as a present. After about the age of 20, he left drawing and painting behind as life as a miner took over, and he did not pick it up again until 1957, two years after the closure, when he was 64 and working as a nightwatchman at the mining company's main office in Tagawa. He took first to drawing and painting sumi-e (ink wash drawing) in journals and on scraps of paper.

The head of the mining company, Tatsuo Nagao, learned of the paintings in 1961. Through Nagao's encouragement and connections, a collection of the paintings was published privately in 1963 and Yamamoto was put in touch with the curator of the Tagawa City Public Library, Toshio Nagasue. Yamamoto donated work to the library, who asked him to produce watercolour versions – in colour – of much of his earlier black-and-white work, providing him with high-quality paper and paint. Yamamoto was initially resistant to working in colour, since the mines were in reality very dark, but he did so and continued to work in colour thereafter, producing, at least for the next year, roughly one painting every two days.

By the time of his death on 19 December 1984, Yamamoto had produced some 2,000 paintings between the sketchbooks he filled and his stand-alone work.

=== Style ===
Yamamoto's work has been described as naïve art, consisting primarily of watercolour paintings of mining scenes, accompanied by a great deal of text. His motivation for producing the work was to record his memories of mining life for posterity and his grandchildren as industrial development meant that the way of life he had known in mining was fading away. The blend of images and explanatory, reflective text puts his work somewhere between purely artistic painting and something more intentionally documentary, intended to record and explain the times he lived through. Reviewing a 2015 exhibition at Fukuoka City Museum for Artscape, critic Ren Fukuzumi described his technique as basic, even childish, but the images as captivating. He said that because of both his technique and his subjects, Yamamoto's work is generally described as outsider art but it differs from other work bearing that label by not being insular, instead expressing an eagerness to teach, inviting in viewers who might not know anything about mining.

== Recognition and exhibitions ==
A programme about Yamamoto's life and art called A Life, A Mountain of Rubble was broadcast in 1967. This led to two publications anthologising his work: Life in the Coal Mines: An Anthology from Kodansha later in 1967, and Sakubei Yamamoto Anthology: The Chikuho Coal Mine Collection in 1973.

In 2011, a collection of Yamamoto's diaries and paintings were inscribed in the UNESCO Memory of the World Register as a "totally authentic personal view of a period of great historical significance to the world" that, by contrast with other records of the time, which tended to be official and abstracted, had a "rawness and immediacy". This was the first time that Japan had been included in the register.

The collection consists of 589 paintings, 65 diaries, 15 notebooks, and other documents. Almost all of the paintings are at the Tagawa City Coal Mining Historical Museum, while most of the written work is held by Fukuoka Prefectural University.

Exhibitions of his work outside Fukuoka include one in 2013 at Tokyo Tower. An exhibition at the Tokyo Fuji Art Museum to celebrate the tenth anniversary of the Memory of the World inclusion is planned for 2022 (delayed from 2021 due to the COVID-19 pandemic).

As part of the "Japan–UK Season of Culture" in 2019 and 2020, selections of Yamamoto's work were exhibited in the UK, at the Japanese embassy in London, Big Pit National Coal Museum in Wales, and the Brunei Gallery of SOAS University of London. It was supposed to continue to the National Mining Museum Scotland but, owing to the pandemic, that could not take place at the time. The Season of Culture was extended to the end of 2021.

== See also ==
- Ashington Group – English society of mostly coal miners who became artists starting in the 1930s
- Norman Cornish, Tom Lamb and Tom McGuinness – three miners and artists from County Durham, England
- George Bissill – miner, painter, and furniture designer from Gloucestershire
