= Xu Hanhao =

Republic of China politician (1907–1984)

- 徐漢豪
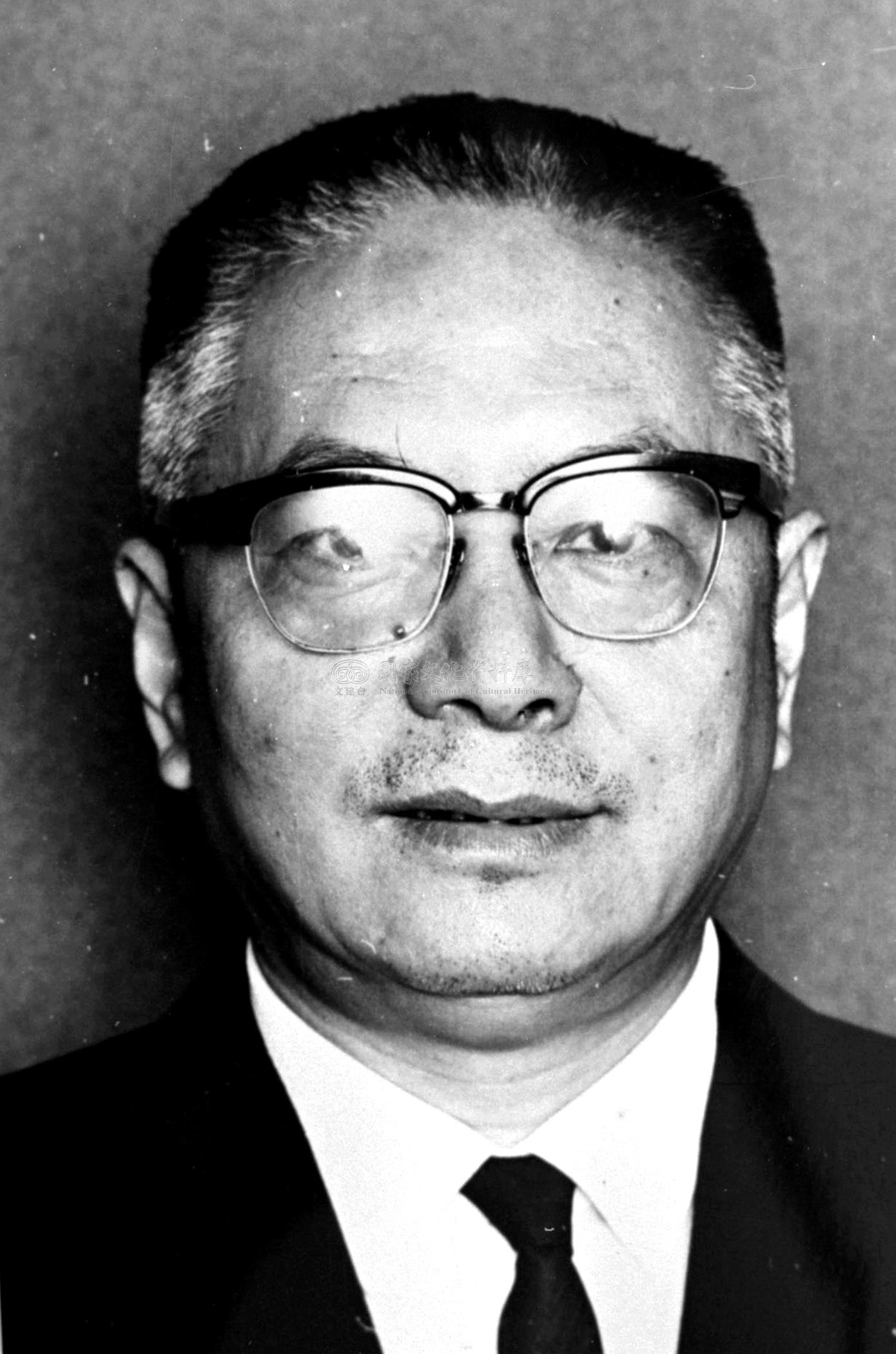
- Portrait of Xu published in 1969

Member of the Legislative Yuan
- In office October 1950 – 27 December 1984
- Preceded by: multi-member district
- Succeeded by: multi-member district
- Constituency: Jiangsu 3

Personal details
- Born: 28 December 1907 Qing China
- Died: 27 December 1984 (aged 76) Taiwan
- Party: Young China Party
- Education: Nancy-Université

Xu Hanhao (Chinese: 徐漢豪; 28 December 1907 – 27 December 1984) was a Chinese-born politician. Xu began his political career in China as a member of the Fujian Provincial Government, served on the National Constituent Assembly convened in 1946, then moved to Taiwan following the Chinese Civil War. In Taiwan, he was a member of the Legislative Yuan from 1950 to his death in 1984.

== Education and academic career ==
Xu graduated from Nancy-Université before returning to China, where he successively held professorships at Xiamen University and Sichuan University. Xu's academic career continued with a professorship and deanship at the Great China University, followed by professorships at Northeastern University, Central Police University, and National Chengchi University.

== Political career ==
Xu began his political career within the Fujian Provincial Government and also served on the National Constituent Assembly in 1946. In 1950, Xu replaced legislator-elect Wu Shaoshu as a member of the first Legislative Yuan representing Jiangsu's third district. Xu was affiliated with the Young China Party, and had served on the party's central executive and central standing committees. While leading the party's communications division, he founded The Modern Nation, a monthly publication.

Xu fell ill and died on 27 December 1984, one day before his 77th birthday.
