= Bice Sechi-Zorn =

American physicist (1928–1984)

- Born: 1928
- Died: 1984 (aged 55–56)
- Education: University of Cagliari
- Scientific career
- Workplaces: University of Maryland

Bice Sechi-Zorn (1928 – 10 December 1984, Hamburg) was an Italian/American nuclear physicist, and professor at the University of Maryland.

== Life ==
She graduated from University of Cagliari. She met her husband, Gus T. Zorn, at the University of Padua. They both worked at the University of Maryland. She was a professor of physics beginning from 1976 to 1984.

A Gus T. Zorn and Bice Sechi-Zorn Professorship in Experimental Physics is named for her.
