= Alphonse Fiquet =

French politician

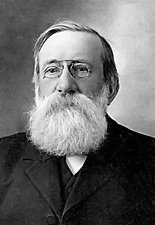
- Born: 8 April 1841; Amiens, France
- Died: 14 June 1916 (aged 75); Paris, France
- Occupation: Politician

Alphonse Fiquet (8 April 1841 – 14 June 1916) was a French politician. He served as a member of the Chamber of Deputies from 1893 to 1909, representing Somme. He also served as a member of the French Senate from 1909 to 1916, representing Somme.
