= Jean Gilbert-Jules =

French politician (1903–1984)

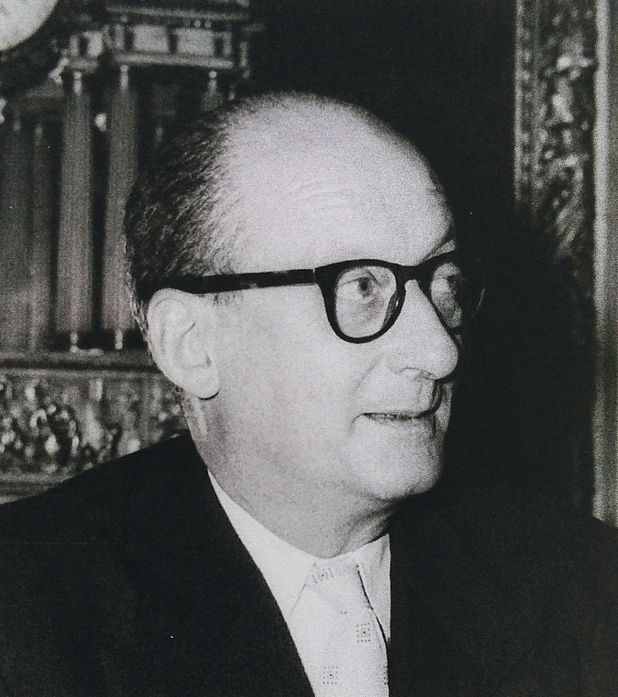
Portrait of Jean Gilbert-Jules

Jean Gilbert-Jules (1 September 1903 – 31 December 1984) was a French lawyer and politician. He was Minister of the Interior from February 1956 to May 1957 and from June 1957 to September 1957. He belonged to the Republican, Radical and Radical-Socialist Party.

He later served as a member of the Constitutional Council from 1959 to 1968.
