= Frédéric Petit (19th-century politician) =

French politician (1836–1895)

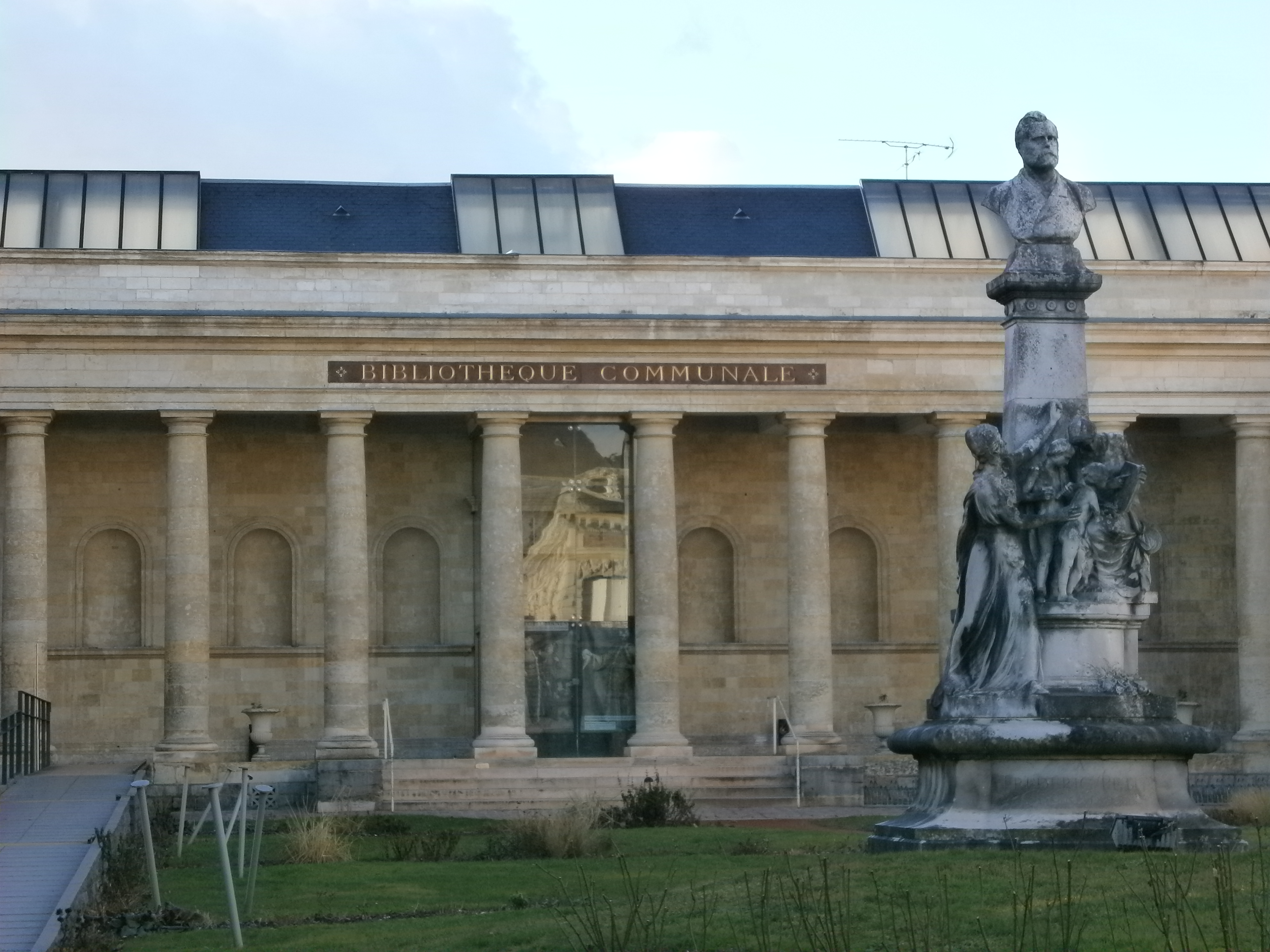
Louis-Aragon Municipal Library of Amiens, with its monument to Petit in front

François-Frédéric "Frédéric" Petit (French pronunciation: [fʁedeʁik pəti]; 3 June 1836 – 20 April 1895) was a 19th-century French politician. He was born in the Somme commune of Bussy-lès-Daours. He served as the mayor of the city of Amiens from 1880 to 1881 and again from 1884 to 1885. On 31 January 1886, during the French Third Republic, he was elected a senator for Somme. He was reelected on 4 January 1891 but did not complete his full term due to his death in 1895.
