= Nelson Riddle discography =

The following is the discography for big band and traditional pop arranger Nelson Riddle (1921–1985).

== Albums ==
=== By his name ===
- The Music from Oklahoma! (Capitol, 1955)
- Moonglow (Capitol, 1955) (Note: A 7-inch 45 RPM "Extended Play" recording with four tracks: "Moonglow," "Vilia," "Venezuela," and "Brother John."David Edwards; Patrice Eyries; Tim Neely; Randy Watts; Mike Callahan. "Capitol Main Series Album Discography Preview; Series 600-2999". bsnpubs.com.)
- Lisbon Antigua (Capitol, 1956) (Note: A 7-inch 45 RPM "Extended Play" recording with four tracks: "Lisbon Antigua," "In The Hall Of The Mountain King," "Robin Hood," and "The Argentine Fire Brigade." "Record Details". 45cat.com.)
- The Tender Touch (Capitol, 1956)
- Hey...Let Yourself Go! (Capitol, 1957)
- C'mon...Get Happy! (Capitol, 1957)
- Sea of Dreams (Capitol, 1958)
- Nelson Riddle Plays Gershwin (His Master's Voice, 1959) (Note: A 7-inch 45 RPM "Extended Play" recording with six tracks: Side A's "Ambulatory Suite" consisting of "Promenade (Walking the Dog)", "March of the Swiss Soldiers", and "Fidgety Feet"; and Side B's "The Preludes", numbered I, II, and III."Nelson Riddle – Nelson Riddle Plays Gershwin". Discogs.com. The tracks were also included in the 1998 4-CD set re-issue of "Ella Fitzgerald Sings the George and Ira Gershwin Song Book".)
- The Joy of Living (Capitol, 1959)
- Sing a Song with Riddle (Capitol, 1959)
- Music of the Motion Picture "Can Can" (Capitol, 1960)
- Original Music from The TV Show The Untouchables (Capitol, 1960)
- Dance to the Music of "Tenderloin" (Capitol, 1961)
- Love Tide (Capitol, 1961)
- Magic Moments from "The Gay Life" (Capitol, 1961)
- Nelson Riddle (Capitol, 1962) (Note: A 7-inch 45 RPM "Extended Play" recording released in France and Spain, with four tracks: "Bon Soir Lisboa," "Siesta in Sevilla," "Autumn in Rio," and "Ziganette." "Record Details". 45cat.com.)
- Route 66 Theme and Other Great TV Hits (Capitol, 1962)
- Love Is a Game of Poker (Capitol, 1962)
- More Hit TV Themes (Capitol, 1963)
- The Best of Nelson Riddle (Capitol, 1963)
- Oscar Peterson and Nelson Riddle with Oscar Peterson (Verve, 1963)
- White on White, Shangri-La, Charade & Other Hits of 1964 (Reprise, 1964)
- Original Music from The Rogues (RCA, 1964)
- Interprets Great Music, Great Films, Great Sounds (Reprise, 1964)
- NAT: An Orchestral Portrait of Nat "King" Cole (Reprise, 1966)
- Let's Face The Music & Dance! (Pickwick, 1966) (Note: A re-issue of Capitol tracks originally released on Hey...Let Yourself Go!, C'mon...Get Happy!, and Music of the Motion Picture "Can Can".)
- Music for Wives and Lovers (Solid State, 1967) (Note: Released on vinyl in Europe under the title For Swinging Lovers.)
- The Bright and the Beautiful (Liberty, 1967)
- The Riddle of Today (Liberty, 1968)
- The Contemporary Sound of Nelson Riddle (United Artists, 1968)
- British Columbia Suite (Capilano, 1969)
- The Riddle Touch (Sunset, 1969) (Note: A re-issue of Liberty tracks originally released on The Bright and The Beautiful and The Riddle of Today.)
- Nelson Riddle Conducts The 101 Strings (Marble Arch, 1970) (Note: Re-issued as Nelson Riddle Arranges and Conducts the 101 Strings (Alshire, 1970); as Bridge Over Troubled Water (Alshire, 1971); and, minus "Bridge Over Troubled Water", as Swingin' Songs (Alshire, 1972) in four-channel stereo.)
- Communication (MPS, 1971)
- Changing Colors (MPS, 1972)
- Vive Legrand! (Daybreak, 1973)
- The Look of Love (Bulldog, 1982)
- Romance, Fire and Fancy (Intersound, 1983)
- The Silver Collection (MPS, 1984) (Note: A re-issue of tracks originally released on Communication and Changing Colors.)

=== By other's credit ===
With Rosemary Clooney

- Rosie Solves the Swingin' Riddle! (RCA Victor, 1961)
- Love (Reprise, 1963)

With Nat King Cole

- Unforgettable (Capitol, 1954)
- Nat King Cole Sings for Two in Love (Capitol, 1954)
- The Piano Style of Nat King Cole (Capitol, 1955)
- Ballads of the Day (Capitol, 1956)
- This is Nat King Cole (Capitol, 1957)
- St. Louis Blues (Capitol, 1958)
- Cole Español (1958)
- To Whom It May Concern (Capitol, 1959)
- Wild Is Love (Capitol, 1960)
- Nat Cole Sings the Great Songs (Capitol, 1964)

With Ella Fitzgerald

- Ella Fitzgerald Sings the George and Ira Gershwin Songbook (Verve, 1959)
- Ella Swings Gently with Nelson (Verve, 1962)
- Ella Swings Brightly with Nelson (Verve, 1962)
- Ella Fitzgerald Sings the Jerome Kern Songbook (Verve, 1963)
- Ella Fitzgerald Sings the Johnny Mercer Songbook (Verve, 1964)
- Ella Loves Cole (Atlantic, 1972) re-released as Dream Dancing (Pablo, 1978) with the addition of two new tracks
- The Best Is Yet to Come (Pablo, 1982)

With Judy Garland

- Judy (1956)
- Judy in Love (Capitol, 1958)

With Peggy Lee

- The Man I Love (Capitol, 1957)
- Jump for Joy (Capitol, 1958)

With Dean Martin

- This Time I'm Swingin' (Capitol, 1960)
- Cha Cha de Amor (Capitol, 1962)

With Johnny Mathis

- I'll Buy You a Star (Capitol, 1962)
- Live it Up (Columbia, 1963)

With Linda Ronstadt

- What's New? (Elektra, 1983)
- Lush Life (Elektra, 1984)
- For Sentimental Reasons (Elektra, 1986)

With Tommy Sands

- When I'm Thinking of You (Capitol, 1959)
- Dream with Me (Capitol, 1960)

With Frank Sinatra

- Swing Easy (Capitol, 1954)
- Songs for Young Lovers (Capitol, 1954)
- In the Wee Small Hours (Capitol, 1955)
- Songs for Swingin' Lovers (Capitol, 1956)
- This Is Sinatra! (Capitol, 1956)
- Close to You (Capitol, 1956)
- A Swingin' Affair! (Capitol, 1956)
- This Is Sinatra Volume 2 (Capitol, 1958)
- Frank Sinatra Sings for Only the Lonely (Capitol, 1958)
- Look to Your Heart (Capitol, 1959)
- Nice 'n' Easy (Capitol, 1960)
- Sinatra's Swingin' Session!!! (Capitol, 1960)
- All the Way (Capitol, 1961)
- Sinatra Sings of Love & Things (Capitol, 1962)
- The Concert Sinatra (1963)
- Sinatra's Sinatra (1963)
- Sinatra Sings Days of Wine and Roses, Moon River, and Other Academy Award Winners (Reprise, 1964)
- Strangers in the Night (Reprise, 1966)
- Moonlight Sinatra (Reprise, 1966)

With Frank Sinatra Jr.

- Spice (Daybreak, 1971)
- His Way (Daybreak, 1972)

With Keely Smith

- I Wish You Love (Capitol, 1958)
- Swingin' Pretty (Capitol, 1959)
- Little Girl Blue/Little Girl New (Reprise, 1963)

With Ed Townsend

- New in Town (Capitol, 1959)
- Glad to Be Here (Capitol, 1959)

With others

- Anna Maria Alberghetti, Warm and Willing (Capitol, 1960)
- Shirley Bassey, Shirley Bassey Sings The Hit Song From Oliver! "As Long As He Needs Me" Plus Other Popular Selections, (United Artists Records, 1962) (Note: Released in the U.K. as Let's Face the Music with "I Can't Get You Out Of My Mind" replacing "As Long As He Needs Me." Re-issued in 1971 in the U.K. under the title What Now My Love.)
- Bing Crosby, Return to Paradise Islands (Reprise, 1964)
- Sammy Davis Jr., That's Entertainment (MGM, 1974)
- Buddy DeFranco, Cross Country Suite (Dot, 1958)
- Eddie Fisher, Games That Lovers Play (RCA Victor, 1966)
- Antonio Carlos Jobim, The Wonderful World of Antonio Carlos Jobim (Warner Bros., 1965)
- Jack Jones, There's Love and There's Love and There's Love (Kapp, 1965)
- Kiri Te Kanawa, Blue Skies (London, 1985)
- Steve Lawrence, Portrait of Steve (MGM, 1972)
- Sir Yehudi Menuhin & Stéphane Grappelli, Top Hat (Angel, 1981)
- Hibari Misora, Hibari in Los-Angeles (Nippon Columbia, 1974)
- Sue Raney, When Your Lover Has Gone (Capitol, 1958)
- Mavis Rivers, Take a Number (Capitol, 1959)
- Dinah Shore, Dinah, Yes Indeed! (Capitol, 1959)
- Phil Silvers, Phil Silvers and Swinging Brass (Columbia, 1957)
- Kate Smith, TV Curtain Calls - Songs by Kate Smith (Capitol, 1954) (Reissued as Kate Smith (Capitol, 1957))
- Pinky Tomlin, Country Boy (Arvee, 1963)
- Slim Whitman, All Time Favorites (1964)
- Danny Williams, Swinging for You (1962)

== Selected singles ==
- "Brother John" (US No. 23 - April 1954)
- "Lisbon Antigua" (US No. 1 - February 1956)
- "Port Au Prince" (US No. 20 - April 1956)
- "Theme from The Proud Ones" (US No. 39 - July 1956)
- "Route 66 Theme" (US No. 30 - June 1962 - AC No. 9, 1962)
- "Naked City Theme" (US No. 130 - October 1962)
- "What's New" (Featuring Linda Ronstadt) (US No. 53 - December 1983 - AC No. 5, 1983)
- "I've Got a Crush On You" (Featuring Linda Ronstadt) (AC No. 7, 1984)
- "Skylark" (Featuring Linda Ronstadt) (US No. 101 - January 1985)

Sources: Billboard Top Pop Singles, Billboard Adult Contemporary Billboard Bubbling Under Singles Books

== Arranger for film and television ==
- The Rosemary Clooney Show (1956)
- Pal Joey (1957)
- Can-Can (1960)
- Robin and the 7 Hoods (1964)
- Paint Your Wagon (1969)
- On a Clear Day You Can See Forever (1970)
- The Julie Andrews Hour (1973)
- The Carpenters: Music, Music, Music (1980)
- Till There Was You
- A Man and His Music

== Composer for film and television ==
- Lisbon (1956)
- Li'l Abner (1959)
- The Untouchables (1959 TV)
- Route 66 (1960 TV)
- Naked City (1960 TV)
- Ocean's Eleven (1960)
- Lolita (1962)
- 4 for Texas (1963)
- The Rogues (1964)
- A Rage to Live (1965)
- Batman (1966 film)
- Batman (1966–68 TV )
- El Dorado (1966)
- How to Succeed in Business Without Really Trying (1967)
- This Is the Life (1971)
- Emergency! (1972)
- The Great Gatsby (1974)
