= The Best of Nelson Riddle =

Compilation album by Nelson Riddle
- Released: 1963
- Studios: Capitol Records, Hollywood, California
- Genres: Pop, easy listening
- Length: 28:45
- Label: Capitol (T-1990 / DT-1990)

Nelson Riddle chronology
More Hit TV Themes (1963)	The Best of Nelson Riddle (1963)	White on White, Shangri-La, Charade & Other Hits of 1964 (1964)

The Best of Nelson Riddle is a compilation album of composer-arranger Nelson Riddle's hit singles and popular tracks from his LP albums, released in October 1963. Best of was issued under Capitol Records' "Star Line" banner, a series of LPs spotlighting artists' previous singles and LP releases. It was compiled after Riddle had completed fifteen studio albums for Capitol, and was his last release issued by the label.

The liner notes compliment the artist by observing that the "smooth cohesion of an orchestra under Riddle's leadership takes on an added magic at times, for Nelson knows instinctively when and how to throw in those special blends of instrumental voices which cause the listener to sit up and take extra notice."

== Reception ==
Cash Box classified the album as a "Pop Best Bet", describing it as a "top-drawer package of instrumentals."

Billboard awarded the album a "Pop Special Merit" title, noting the "usual bright, up-tempo style associated with the conductor-arranger."

== Track listing ==
=== Side 1 ===
No.	Title	Writer(s)	Album	Length
1.	"Lisbon Antigua"	Do Vale, Galhardo, Portela	Lisbon Antigua	2:31
2.	"The Green Leaves of Summer"	Tiomkin, Webster		2:19
3.	"Naked City Theme"	May	Route 66 Theme and Other Great TV Themes	2:09
4.	"Younger Than Springtime"	Rodgers, Hammerstein	Hey...Let Yourself Go!	3:25
5.	"Drive-In"	Bee		1:52
6.	"The Untouchables"	Riddle	Route 66 Theme and Other Great TV Themes	2:16

=== Side 2 ===
No.	Title	Writer(s)	Album	Length
1.	"Route 66 Theme"	Riddle	Route 66 Theme and Other Great TV Themes	2:05
2.	"I'm Getting Sentimental Over You"	Bassman, Washington		2:58
3.	"Brother John"	Riddle (arr.)	Moonglow	2:14
4.	"Life Is Just a Bowl of Cherries"	Brown, Henderson	The Joy of Living	2:03
5.	"Volare"	Modugno, Milgliacci		2:02
6.	"De Guello"	Tiomkin		2:51
