= Shorty Sherock =

American jazz trumpeter (1915–1980)

Clarence Francis Cherock known professionally as Shorty Sherock (November 17, 1915 – February 19, 1980) was an American swing jazz trumpeter.

== Career ==
He was born in Minneapolis, Minnesota, United States. Sherock attended the Illinois Military Academy. In the 1930s he was a soloist with the Jimmy Dorsey orchestra and with the Gene Krupa orchestra. He led a big band in the 1940s. He was a featured soloist in Los Angeles in 1944 at the first Jazz at the Philharmonic concert. The concert included Nat King Cole, Illinois Jacquet, J. J. Johnson, Jack McVea, and Les Paul.

On January 31, 1946, Sherock recorded Leonard Feather's composition "Snafu". In 1955, he recorded three tracks for Freddie Slack's Boogie Woogie on the 88.

As a member of the Nelson Riddle Orchestra he appeared on Dean Martin's album This Time I'm Swingin'!, on Frank Sinatra's album Sinatra Sings Days of Wine and Roses, Moon River, and Other Academy Award Winners, and on Ella Fitzgrerald's albums Get Happy!, Ella Swings Brightly with Nelson, Ella Swings Gently with Nelson, Ella Fitzgerald Sings the George and Ira Gershwin Songbook, Ella Fitzgerald Sings the Jerome Kern Songbook, and Ella Fitzgerald Sings the Johnny Mercer Songbook. He worked as a film studio musician in Los Angeles, California.

== Discography ==
=== As leader ===
- Great Swinging Sounds with the Gramercy Six (Edison, 1959)
- Pre-bop (Bob Thiele 1975)

=== As sideman ===
With Glen Gray

- Casa Loma in Hi-Fi (Capitol, 1956)
- Please Mr. Gray (Capitol, 1961)
- Solo Spotlight (Capitol, 1960)
- Themes of the Great Bands (Capitol, 1963)
- Today's Best (Capitol, 1963)
- Jonah Jones Quartet/Glen Gray Casa Loma Orchestra (Capitol, 1961)

With others

- Van Alexander, The Home of Happy Feet (Capitol, 1959)
- Benny Carter, Aspects (United Artists, 1959)
- Benny Carter, BBB & Co. (Prestige, 1962)
- Bing Crosby and Louis Armstrong, Bing & Satchmo (MGM, 1960)
- Bobby Darin, From Hello Dolly to Goodbye Charlie (Capitol, 1964)
- Ella Fitzgerald, Sings the Jerome Kern Songbook (Verve, 1963)
- Ella Fitzgerald, Dream Dancine (Pablo, 1979)
- Pete Fountain, The Blues (Coral, 1959)
- Mel Henke, The Mad Music World of Mel Henke (Warner Bros., 1962)
- Freddy Martin, Salute to the Smooth Bands (Capitol, 1959)
- Matty Matlock, The Dixieland Story Vol. 2 (Warner Bros., 1959)
- Nelson Riddle, Contemporary Sound of Nelson Riddle (United Artists, 1968)
- Mavis Rivers, Swing Along with Mavis (Reprise, 1961)
