= Dance to the Music of "Tenderloin" =

Dance to the Music of “Tenderloin”

Studio album by Nelson Riddle
- Released: 1961
- Recorded: 1960
- Studio: Capitol Records
- Genre: Show tunes, traditional pop
- Length: 32:09
- Label: Capitol ST-1536
- Producer: Lee Gillette

Nelson Riddle chronology
Original Music from The TV Show The Untouchables (1960)	Dance to the Music of “Tenderloin” (1961)	Love Tide (1961)

Dance to the Music of “Tenderloin” was the Nelson Riddle Orchestra's tenth studio LP, released on Capitol records in 1961, with songs from the musical “Tenderloin’’, by Sheldon Harnick and Jerry Bock.

== Origin ==
Nelson Riddle’s biographer observed that into the 1960s, there was a continued market “for instrumental versions of movie soundtracks and Broadway shows." Riddle followed this musical trail with The Music from Oklahoma! in 1955, and Music of the Motion Picture "Can Can" in 1960 (for which he also arranged and conducted the score, earning an Academy Award nomination). “Tenderloin” was his next subject.

The liner notes report that Riddle “utilized a huge contingent of brass, strings, woodwinds, and rhythm, varying the instrumentation to suit the mood and style of each number,” including “high-powered swinging arrangements,” “smooth ballads, gentle waltzes, and even a march with an old-fashioned revival flavor.” Riddle composed the final track, “Tenderloin Finale,” a medley of the show tunes sandwiched between the show hit, “Artificial Flowers.” ."

== Reception ==
The release of Dance to the Music of "Tenderloin" was overshadowed by Capitol’s release at the same time of the original Broadway cast album from the musical. Capitol did, however, release two of the tracks from the Riddle album on a 45 rpm single, “Little Old New York” and “My Gentle Young Johnny.” Cash Box predicted that the record “should get overwhelming deejay and consumer acceptance.”

== Track listing ==
=== Side 1 ===
1. "Little Old New York" – 2:57
2. "Bless This Land" – 2:25
3. "The Picture of Happiness" – 3:48
4. "Artificial Flowers" – 3:11
5. "The Army of the Just" – 2:13

=== Side 2 ===
1. "Tommy, Tommy" – 2:57
2. "My Gentle Young Johnny" – 3:27
3. ”Good Clean Fun" – 2:48
4. "My Miss Mary" – 2:38
5. "Tenderloin - Finale" – 5:45
