= Love Is a Game of Poker =

Studio album by Nelson Riddle
- Released: 1962
- Recorded: 1962
- Genre: Pop music
- Length: 34:01
- Label: Capitol ST-1817

Nelson Riddle chronology
Route 66 Theme and Other Great TV Themes (1962)	Love Is a Game of Poker (1962)	More Hit TV Themes (1963)

Love Is a Game of Poker is the fourteenth studio album by American composer and arranger Nelson Riddle, released in 1962.

== Reception ==
Professional ratings
Review scores
Source	Rating
Allmusic	3/5 stars
New Record Mirror	3/5 stars

William Ruhlmann reviewed the album for Allmusic and wrote that it seemed "...to have been influenced by Henry Mancini's similar success, leading to a more prominent rhythm section and a jazzier feel than one usually associates with Riddle's charts", and that Riddle's "feel for melody was not extinguished by any means but, probably due to his recent experience, his arrangements and (on three tracks) compositions had a far more cinematic flair, which gave them an early-'60s contemporaneity and brought him out of the '50s just as he was moving on to new challenges".

DJ Spooky, in his 2008 book Sound Unbound: Sampling Digital Music and Culture described Riddle's arrangement of "Witchcraft" on this album as a "brain-tickling juxtaposition of reverberating strings, bells, and chimes."

== Track listing ==
=== Side 1 ===
No.	Title	Writer(s)	Length
1.	"Playboy's Theme"	Cy Coleman, Carolyn Leigh	2:54
2.	"Alone Too Long"	Dorothy Fields, Arthur Schwartz	2:37
3.	"Queen of Hearts"	Nelson Riddle	3:10
4.	"Red Silk Stockings and Green Perfume"	Bob Hilliard, Sammy Mysels, Dick Sanford	3:01
5.	"Finesse"	Riddle	3:30
6.	"A Game of Poker"	Harold Arlen, Johnny Mercer	2:16

=== Side 2 ===
No.	Title	Writer(s)	Length
1.	"It's So Nice to Have a Man Around the House"	Jack Elliott, Harold Spina	2:23
2.	"Witchcraft"	Coleman, Leigh	3:18
3.	"Two Hearts Wild"	Riddle	2:12
4.	"You Fascinate Me So"	Coleman, Leigh	3:13
5.	"Penny Ante"	Riddle	3:00
6.	"Indiscreet"	Sammy Cahn, Jimmy Van Heusen	2:27

== Personnel ==
- Nelson Riddle – arranger
- Dick Nash - Trombone
- Tommy Shepard - Trombone
- Jimmy Henderson - Trombone
- George Roberts - Bass Trombone
- Shorty Sherock - Trumpet
- Cappy Lewis - Trumpet
- Don Fagerquist - Trumpet
- Ronnie Lang - Saxophone
- Buddy Collette - Flute/Saxophone
- Wilbur (Willie) Schwartz - Clarinet
- Vince De Rosa French Horn
- Frank Flynn - Drummer
- Ray Sherman - Piano
- Joe Comfort - Bass

== Re-releases ==
=== Pickwick Records ===
In June 1965, Pickwick Records released seven of the twelve tracks from Love Is a Game of Poker in a ten-track album titled Witchcraft!. Additional tracks came from 1957’s Hey...Let Yourself Go!,* plus a side from a 45 rpm single.**

==== Side 1 ====
1. ”Witchcraft”
2. ”Along Too Long”
3. ”Red Silk Stockings”
4. ”It’s So Nice to Have a Man Around The House”
5. ”You Fascinate Me So”

==== Side 2 ====
1. ”Playboy’s Theme”
2. ”Indiscreet”
3. ”I Get Along Without You Very Well”*
4. ”Darn That Dream”*
5. ”Blue Safari”**

An album identical to the Pickwick record—even the liner notes—was released on the Sears label.

=== Alshire Records ===
In 1971 Alshire Records issued a budget re-release of ten of the twelve tracks from Love is a Game of Poker re-titled Spectacular Brass!!! Fantastic Reeds!!! and the Magnificent 101 Strings, and credited to "Nelson Riddle with America's Top Soloists." The disc lacked "A Game of Poker" and "You Fascinate Me So."
