= Red Silk Stockings and Green Perfume =

Single by Ray McKinley and his Orchestra
- B-side: "Jiminy Crickets"
- Released: 1947
- Genre: Traditional pop
- Length: 2:54
- Label: Majestic
- Songwriters: Bob Hilliard, Sammy Mysels, Dick Sanford

"Red Silk Stockings and Green Perfume" is a pop song written in 1946 by Bob Hilliard, Sammy Mysels, and Dick Sanford (né Richard Young Sandford; 1896–1981). The first version was by *Ray McKinley and his Orchestra

== Other recorded versions ==
The song was recorded by many artists, among them:

- It was a top-ten hit for Sammy Kaye in 1947
- Roy Hogsed
- The Crossroads Gang
- The Andrews Sisters
- Nelson Riddle on his 1962 album Love is a Game of Poker
- Archie Campbell his 1966 album The Cockfight and Other Tall Tales
