= White on White (disambiguation) =

White on White is a 1918 abstract oil-on-canvas painting by Kazimir Malevich.

White on White may also refer to:

- White on White (album), a 1976 studio album by Brian Cadd
- White on White (film), a 2019 Spanish-Chilean drama directed by Théo Court
- "White on White" (song), a 1964 song by Danny Williams
- White on White, a form of blotter for means of transporting and taking psychedelic compounds

== See also ==
- White on White, Shangri-La, Charade & Other Hits of 1964, an album by Nelson Riddle
