= Magic Moment =

Magic Moment may refer to:

== Music ==
=== Albums ===
- Cee Lo's Magic Moment, album by Cee Lo
- Magic Moment, album by A'Cappella ExpreSSS
- Magic Moment, album by Wakana
- Magic Moments from "The Gay Life", album by Nelson Riddle of music from Arthur Schwartz and Howard Dietz's musical The Gay Life, or the title track

=== Songs ===
- "Magic Moment", a song by DJ Sammy from the album Life Is Just a Game
- "Magic Moment", a song by The Stan Kenton Orchestra from the extended version of the album Sophisticated Approach
- "Magic Moment", a song by Loona
- "Magic Moments", song with music by Burt Bacharach and lyrics by Hal David, performed by Perry Como

== Film and television ==
- Magic Moments Motion Pictures, an Indian Bengali-language television serial and film production company
- "Magischen Moment" (Magic Moment), a television episode of the music competition series Deutschland sucht den Superstar

=== Other uses ===
- Magic Moment, a novel by Martha Cecilia
- Magic Moment, a gameplay feature in the theme park attraction Who Wants to Be a Millionaire – Play It!
- Magic Moment, a show in the Land of Oz theme park
- "The Magic Moment", a painting by country music artist Ronnie McDowell
- EuroLeague Magic Moment of the Season
- Magic Moment, annual sports award given in snooker, see 2010–11 snooker season

== See also ==
- This Magic Moment (disambiguation)
