= The Tender Touch =

Studio album by Nelson Riddle
- Released: 1956
- Recorded: 1956
- Studio: Capitol Records
- Genre: Traditional pop
- Label: Capitol T-753

Nelson Riddle chronology
The Music from Oklahoma! (1955)	The Tender Touch (1956)	Hey...Let Yourself Go! (1957)

The Tender Touch is the second studio album by Nelson Riddle, released in 1956.

== Origin ==
The Tender Touch contains, to quote its liner notes, "some of the most romantic of all love songs—melodies as tender as a caress and unforgettably lovely." It was released the year after the Riddle orchestra's first effort, a collection of contemporary pop arrangements of the memorable tunes from the musical Oklahoma!.

== Release ==
Capitol Records released The Tender Touch in December 1956, at the same time it released the Frank Sinatra / Nelson Riddle compilation album This Is Sinatra!, reflecting the busy year Riddle had with the label. He had also scored the music to the Sinatra Western film Johnny Concho (which included the release of a 7-inch 45 RPM "Extended Play" recording). He arranged and conducted Nat King Cole's last instrumental album, The Piano Style of Nat King Cole. And his hit single "Lisbon Antigua" had spent four weeks at the top of the music charts early in that year.

Within a month of its release, Billboard ranked The Tender Touch among the top ten pop instrumental releases.

The recording was subsequently issued by EMI's British mail order label, The World Record Club, under the title Relax with Nelson Riddle.

== Track listing ==
=== Side 1 ===
No.	Title	Writer(s)	Length
1.	"Love Letters"	Victor Young, Edward Heyman	3:19
2.	"As You Desire Me"	Allie Wrubel	2:15
3.	"All or Nothing at All"	Jack Lawrence, Arthur Altman	3:01
4.	"I Was Lucky"	Jack Stern, A. Horne	3:26
5.	"Body and Soul"	Johnny Green, Edward Heyman, Robert Sour, Frank Eyton	4:20

=== Side 2 ===
No.	Title	Writer(s)	Length
1.	"The Touch of Your Lips"	Ray Noble	2:10
2.	"Please Be Kind"	Sammy Cahn, Saul Chaplin	3:44
3.	"You're Mine, You!"	Johnny Green, Edward Heyman	3:46
4.	"Heaven Can Wait"	Eddie De Lange, Jimmy Van Heusen	2:46
5.	"Symphony"	Alstone, Tabet, Bernstein	3:10
6.	"The Tender Touch, vocal by Sande Ellis"	Joe Green, Nelson Riddle	2:44
