= Original Music from The TV Show The Untouchables =

Studio album by Nelson Riddle
- Released: 1960
- Recorded: 1960
- Genre: Big band, pop
- Length: 30:52
- Label: Capitol T1430/ST-1430
- Producer: Lee Gillette

Nelson Riddle chronology
Music of the Motion Picture "Can Can" (1960)	Original Music from The TV Show; The Untouchables (1960)	Dance to the Music of "Tenderloin" (1961)

Original Music from The Untouchables is a soundtrack album to the 1959 ABC television crime drama series "The Untouchables", composed and conducted by Nelson Riddle.

== Conception ==
Desilu Productions produced "The Untouchables," which starred Robert Stack as Prohibition agent Eliot Ness, who assembled a team of federal agents to go up against the bootleg empire of “Scarface” Al Capone in 1920s Chicago. The theme music Riddle wrote for the series, said his biographer, “was one of the most fitting and identifiable weekly television themes ever written.”

The program was an immediate hit and received four Emmy Awards in its first season, more than any single program. This spurred Capitol Records to rush production on an album of original music from the show. The album was released in September 1960.

The liner notes characterize Riddle’s effort as “tabloid-headline music that evokes and reports on a bygone era of irresistible appeal,” including several tracks devoted “to the vintage jazz that punctuated the gunfire.” The memorable theme “marches on the listener as inexorably as Time marched on [gangsters] John Dillinger, Baby Face Nelson and Pretty Boy Floyd.”

== Reception ==
The album was rushed to recording in June 1960, on the heels of “The Untouchables” having won four Emmy Awards, in a hopefully successful tie-in to the popular TV show.

Cash Box attributed the "thundering impact which the [show] has had on audiences" in part to "the vivid Nelson Riddle score," including the "pulsating main theme."

Billboard called the album a "strong package," which "features a haunting score" that included "catchy jazz-age-styled instrumentals of the 1920s and some dramatic musical impressions of mobsters of that era."

== Track listing ==
All compositions by Nelson Riddle.

=== Side 1 ===
1. "The Untouchables Theme" 2:16
2. "Tender-Ness" 2:15
3. "Dauntless-Ness" 1:50
4. "Ebony and Ivory" 2:05
5. "The Loop" 2:12
6. "Speakeasy Blues" 3:58

=== Side 2 ===
1. "Reckless-Ness" 1:50
2. "Wistful-Ness" 2:36
3. "Linda" 2:34
4. "Eliot Ness" 1:54
5. "Dejected-Ness" 2:51
6. "30-30" 2:14
7. "Suspenseful-Ness" 2:17
