= British Columbia Suite =

Studio album by Nelson Riddle
- Released: 1969
- Recorded: 1969
- Label: Capilano Records CAPS-701

Nelson Riddle chronology
The Contemporary Sound of Nelson Riddle (1968)	British Columbia Suite (1969)	Nelson Riddle Conducts The 101 Strings (1970)

British Columbia Suite is a 1969 studio album by Nelson Riddle, released on the Capilano Records label.

== Origin ==
"British Columbia Suite" is a work composed by Nelson Riddle that was commissioned in August 1968, by the Government of the Province of British Columbia, Canada, as a musical portrait of the province. Its premier performance took place in San Francisco, California, March 19, 1969, with Riddle conducting. The Vancouver Symphony Orchestra performed the suite at Butchart Gardens a year later, on April 14, 1970.

== Album ==
The studio recording of "British Columbia Suite" was released on Vancouver-based Capilano Records in 1969, in a deluxe gatefold album with photographs and text depicting each of the twelve compositions comprising the suite.

Then-Prime Minister W.A.C. Bennett is credited with the album's liner notes, which are congratulatory and laudatory of Riddle's efforts:

It is singularly appropriate that a name as famous in the world of music as Nelson Riddle should be linked at last with a place in this world as well-known and well-loved as British Columbia, Canada.

Mr. Riddle is one of many millions of visitors who have been inspired by the mountains and river-valleys, the lakes and forests, the islands and coastal inlets, the colourful history and light-hearted recreations of Beautiful British Columbia — but he is a very special visitor, in that he has been able to convert that inspiration into beautiful music.

The delightful result is a tribute to our Province and a credit to the composer and his fine musicians, as I am sure will agree when you hear Nelson Riddle's British Columbia Suite.

In 1995 the recording was re-released in compact disc format on the Total Recording label, titled Symphony For The North

== Track listing ==
=== Side 1 ===
1. "The Route of the Haidas"
2. "Peace River"
3. "Victoria"
4. "The Cariboo"
5. "Valley of the Swans"
6. "Government House"

=== Side 2 ===
1. "Vancouver Nights"
2. "The Okanagan"
3. "Butchart Gardens"
4. "Barkerville"
5. "Garibaldi Mountain"
6. "Moving Ahead"
