= Music for Wives and Lovers =

Studio album by Nelson Riddle
- Released: 1967
- Recorded: 1967
- Genre: Pop music
- Label: Solid State SS 18013
- Producer: Sonny Lester

Nelson Riddle chronology
NAT: An Orchestral Portrait of Nat "King" Cole (1966)	Music for Wives and Lovers (1967)	The Bright and the Beautiful (1967)

Music for Wives and Lovers is an album by American composer and arranger Nelson Riddle. It was his only release on the Solid State Records label.

== Origin ==
Producer/musician Sonny Lester signed Riddle to the Solid State label. The liner notes report that he assembled a 42-piece orchestra "and supplied them with arrangements that are fresh and imaginative and in the free-wheeling, youthful spirit of the day." Riddle familiarly "features the harman-mute trumpet, the bass trombone and the baritone sax for powerhouse impact," and added the "exciting sound of the organ."

== Reception ==
Billboard Magazine put the release in its "Pop Spotlight" as "A Billboard pic," with this review:

The Riddle orchestra ranks among the best, and the brilliant sound of this Solid State entry affords the group a perfect showcase. Sparkling arrangements accented by touches of organ add dimension to "Cabaret," "Spanish Eyes" and "Music to Watch Girls By." Top programming and sales potential.

For more than a year after its release, Music for Wives and Lovers was listed in Cash Box's Basic Album Inventory. The list identifies best selling pop albums other than those appearing on the magazine's Top 100 album chart, "top steady selling LP's, as well as recent chart hits still going strong in sales."

In 1967 and 1969, respectively, United Artists Records released the album in vinyl format in Germany and The Netherlands, under the title For Swinging Lovers.

== Track listing ==
=== Side 1 ===
1. "Cabaret" (Fred Ebb, John Kander) – 2:44
2. "Born Free" (Don Black, John Barry) – 2:57
3. "What Now My Love" (Gilbert Bécaud, Carl Sigman) – 2:46
4. "Yesterday" (John Lennon, Paul McCartney) – 3:14
5. "The Shadow of Your Smile" (Johnny Mandel, Paul Francis Webster) – 3:02
6. "Somewhere My Love" (Maurice Jarre, Webster) – 2:57

=== Side 2 ===
1. "Winchester Cathedral" (Geoff Stephens) – 2:55
2. "Wives and Lovers" (Hal David, Burt Bacharach) – 2:01
3. "A Man and a Woman" (Francis Lai, Jerry Keller, Pierre Barouh) – 2:44
4. "Spanish Eyes" (Bert Kaempfert, Charles Singleton, Eddie Snyder) – 2:37
5. "Music to Watch Girls By" (Tony Velona, Sid Ramin) – 3:02
6. "Strangers in the Night" (Bert Kaempfert, Singleton, Snyder) – 3:01

== Personnel ==
- Nelson Riddle – arranger, conductor
- Mike Gross – liner notes
- Phil Ramone – liner notes, recording supervisor
- Unidentified studio orchestra
- Sonny Lester – record producer
