= Love Tide =

Studio album by Nelson Riddle
- Released: 1961
- Recorded: 1961
- Genre: Show tunes, traditional pop
- Label: Capitol ST1571
- Producer: Lee Gillette

Nelson Riddle chronology
| Dance to the Music of "Tenderloin" (1961) | Love Tide (1961) | Magic Moments from "The Gay Life" (1961) |

Love Tide is American composer and arranger Nelson Riddle's eleventh studio album, released in 1961 by Capitol Records. It was a sequel to Riddle's 1958 album Sea of Dreams, according to the liner notes.

== Reception ==
The initial Billboard magazine review from December 11, 1961, described the music as being "played smoothly and capable by the Riddle crew. Attractive cover should also help the set get attention".

Paul D. Miller, in his book Sound Unbound: Sampling Digital Music and Culture, described the title track as demonstrating "moody and tender writing at its best".

A detailed review by the website Ambient Exotica contrasted the album to Riddle's earlier water themed Sea of Dreams and wrote:

The most glaring example for the different soundscapes between both albums are the instruments that are neglected on the first work, but added in the latter: vibraphones, harps, pianos and bongos altogether lessen the romantic notions in Love Tide, but cannot leave an impact once the melodrama and yearning are aurally displayed via the many violin strings. . . . And since Riddle occasionally breaks the overarching concept that is thrown at him by the marketing people at Capitol, you should not expect an adamant frame that solely focuses on the loving couple of the front cover, let alone the liquedous setting. That's actually great, for it is these formula-expanding moments where the album starts to get interesting for Exotica followers, regardless of whether they are fans of Nelson Riddle or not.

== Track listing ==
=== Side 1 ===
1. "Bali Ha'i" (Richard Rodgers, Oscar Hammerstein II) – 3:17
2. "Ill Wind" (Harold Arlen, Ted Koehler) – 2:57
3. "East of the Sun (and West of the Moon)" (Brooks Bowman) – 2:16
4. "Till the End of Time" (Buddy Kaye, Ted Mossman) – 2:30
5. "Caravan" (Duke Ellington, Irving Mills, Juan Tizol) – 2:39

=== Side 2 ===
1. "Sweet Leilani" (Harry Owens) – 3:10
2. "Take Me in Your Arms" (Fred Markush, Mitchell Parish) – 3:10
3. "Solitude" (Ellington, Eddie DeLange, Mills) – 3:37
4. "Santana" (Jimmy Rowles, Nelson Riddle, Ted Satterwhite) – 2:25
5. "Honeysuckle Rose" (Andy Razaf, Fats Waller) – 2:46
6. "Hold Me, Thrill Me, Kiss Me" (Harry Noble) – 2:30
7. "Love Tide" (Lee Gillette, Riddle) – 2:23

== Personnel ==
- Nelson Riddle – arranger
