= The Bright and the Beautiful =

Studio album by Nelson Riddle
- Released: 1967
- Recorded: 1967
- Studio: Annex Studios, Hollywood
- Genre: pop music
- Length: 32:47
- Label: Liberty LRP-3508/LST-7508
- Producer: Dick Peirce

Nelson Riddle chronology
Music for Wives and Lovers (1967)	The Bright and the Beautiful (1967)	The Riddle of Today (1968)

The Bright and the Beautiful was Nelson Riddle’s first album for Liberty Records, released in April 1967.

== Origin ==
Riddle had signed with Liberty in early 1967, recruited by the label's administrative A&R director, Dick Peirce, who was to be his producer. Two records were initially planned—a 45 rpm single, and an album.

The album's liner notes proudly proclaim that “The Bright and the Beautiful is the perfect title for Nelson Riddle's debut album on Liberty Records, for it expresses, not only the content of this album, but all of his music, now and in the future.”

== Reception ==
The Bright and the Beautiful was warmly, if not enthusiastically, received. Billboard placed the album in its “Pop Spotlight” with this assessment:

Nelson Riddle comes on strong in his initial Liberty Records release with a bright package of familiar tunes. He scores strongest in his rendition of the title song from ‘’Thoroughly Modern Millie’’ in this album which centers on movie scores.

Cash Box said Riddle “presents a collection of good music sounds,” with arrangements that are “smooth and stylish.”

In May 1968, The Bright and the Beautiful was listed in Cash Box's Basic Album Inventory. The list identifies best selling pop albums other than those appearing on the magazine's Top 100 album chart, "top steady selling LP's, as well as recent chart hits still going strong in sales."

== Single ==
"Thoroughly Modern Millie" was released as a single from the album, backed with “See the Cheetah.” Cash Box voted the single a “Best Bet,” and it reached number 33 on the Billboard Easy Listening chart.

== Track listing ==
=== Side 1 ===
1. "Gabrielle" (From "Paris When It Sizzles") (Nelson Riddle) 2:35
2. "Lady" (Bert Kaempfert, Charles Singleton, Herbert Rehbein, Kusik) 2:53
3. "A Time For Love" (From "An American Dream") (Johnny Mandel, Webster) 2:43
4. "The 3rd Man Theme" (Anton Karas, Walter Lord) 2:21
5. "Theme From 'The Sand Pebbles'" (And We Were Lovers) (Jerry Goldsmith, Leslie Bricusse) 2:50
6. "Alfie" (Mack David, Burt Bacharach) 3:26

=== Side 2 ===
1. "Sugar Blues" (Clarence Williams, Lucy Fletcher) 2:59
2. "Your Zowie Face" (Theme From "In Like Flint") (Jerry Goldsmith, Leslie Bricusse) 2:35
3. "Thoroughly Modern Millie" (Sammy Cahn, James Van Heusen) 2:30
4. "Sliphorn Skip" (Nelson Riddle) 3:11
5. "Georgy Girl" (Jim Dale, Tom Springfield) 2:13
6. "See The Cheetah" (Alden Shuman) 2:31
