= Get Happy! (Ella Fitzgerald album) =

Studio album by Ella Fitzgerald
- Released: 1959
- Recorded: July 24, 1957 – July 11, 1959 in Hollywood, Los Angeles
- Genre: Jazz
- Length: 37:55
- Label: Verve
- Producer: Norman Granz

Ella Fitzgerald chronology
Hello, Love (1959)	Get Happy! (1959)	Ella Fitzgerald Sings Sweet Songs for Swingers (1959)

Get Happy! is a 1959 album by the American jazz singer Ella Fitzgerald, recorded with various studio orchestras over a two-year period.

== History ==
The original 12 songs on the album come from 5 different sessions, featuring orchestras led by Nelson Riddle, Frank DeVol, Russell (Russ) Garcia, Marty Paich or Paul Weston.

The first two tracks are from the sessions for the George and Ira Gershwin Songbook, which were later included on the 1998 reissue of the album, and Berlin's "Blue Skies" was recorded at the sessions for the 1958 album Sings the Irving Berlin Songbook, but inexplicably omitted from the final cut, despite featuring one of Ella's most impressive extended scat improvisations.

== Reception ==
Professional ratings
Review scores
Source	Rating
Allmusic	3/5 stars
Encyclopedia of Popular Music	4/5 stars
New Record Mirror	4/5
The Penguin Guide to Jazz Recordings	3/4 stars

Writing for Allmusic, music critic Scott Yanow wrote of the album "As usual, Ella uplifts all of the material and her best moments come on "Somebody Loves Me," a heartfelt "Moonlight Becomes You," a scat-filled "Blue Skies" and (somewhat surprisingly) "St. Louis Blues." Although this was not her most essential release, the formerly obscure Get Happy finds Ella Fitzgerald at the peak of her powers."

== Track listing ==
For the 1959 Verve LP release; Verve V6-4036

Side One:

1. "Somebody Loves Me" (Buddy DeSylva, George Gershwin, Ballard MacDonald) – 2:36
2. "Cheerful Little Earful" (Ira Gershwin, Billy Rose, Harry Warren) – 2:06
3. "You Make Me Feel So Young" (Mack Gordon, Josef Myrow) – 2:19
4. "Beat Me Daddy, Eight to the Bar" (Hughie Prince, Don Raye, Eleanore Sheehy) – 2:28
5. "Like Young" (André Previn, Paul Francis Webster) – 3:00
6. "Cool Breeze" (Tadd Dameron, Billy Eckstine, Dizzy Gillespie) – 1:56

Side Two:

1. "Moonlight Becomes You" (Johnny Burke, Jimmy Van Heusen) – 3:06
2. "Blue Skies" (Irving Berlin) – 3:43
3. "You Turned the Tables on Me" (Louis Alter, Sidney Mitchell) – 2:31
4. "Gypsy in My Soul" (Clay Boland, Moe Jaffe) – 2:39
5. "Goody Goody" (Matty Malneck, Johnny Mercer) – 2:28
6. "St. Louis Blues" (W. C. Handy) – 3:53

Bonus Tracks; Issued on the Verve 1998 CD re-issue, Verve 314 523 321–2

13. "A-Tisket, A-Tasket" (Originally released in 1959, on 7" single, a-side) (Van Alexander, Ella Fitzgerald) – 2:20

14. "The Swingin' Shepherd Blues" (Previously unreleased, alternate take) (Kenny Jacobson, Moe Koffman, Rhoda Roberts) – 2:50

== Personnel ==
Recorded in six sessions from July 24, 1957- July 11, 1959 in Hollywood, Los Angeles:

Tracks 1,2 Capitol Studios, Hollywood January 7, 1959 Nelson Riddle (arr, con) Paul Smith (p) Herb Ellis (g) Joe Mondragon (b) Bill Richmond (d) Conrad Gozzo, Cappy Lewis, Vito Mangano, Shorty Sherock (tpt); Dick Noel, Tommy Pederson, George Roberts (trmb);rmb)

Tracks 3,7 Radio Recorders, Hollywood, July 11, 1959 Frank DeVol (arr, con) Lou Levy (p) Herb Ellis (g) Joe Mondragon (b) Alvin Stoller (d) Frank Beach, Pete Candoli, Cappy Lewis, Al Porcino (t) Harry Betts, Dick Noel, George Roberts, lloyd Ulyate (vtrmb)

Track 4 United Recorders, Hollywood, September 3, 1959, Russell Garcia (arr, con) Claude Williamson Jr. (p) Herb Ellis (g) Red Mitchell (b) Jack Sperling (drums) (d) Pete Candoli, Philip Candreva, Buddy Childers, Stu Williamson (t)

Tracks 5,6 United Recorders, Hollywood, September 3, 1959, Marty Paich (arr, con) Claude Williamson Jr. (p) Herb Ellis (g) Red Mitchell (b) Jack Sperling (d) Pete Candoli, Philip Candreva, Buddy Childers, Stu Williamson (t)

Track 8 Radio Recorders, Hollywood, March 18, 1958, Paul Weston (arr, con) Paul Smith (p) Barney Kessel (g) Joe Mondragon (b) Alvin Stoller (d) John Best, Pete Candoli, Harry "Sweets" Edison, Don Fagerquist, Mannie Klein (t)

Tracks 9–13 Capitol Studios. Hollywood, July 24, 1957, Frank DeVol (arr, con) Arnold Ross (p) Barney Kessel (g) Ben Webster (ts) Abe Luboff, Joe Mondragon, Philip Stephens (b) Alvin Stoller (d) Pete Candoli, Harry "Sweets" Edison, Ray Linn, George Werth (t) Milt Bernha

Track 14 Radio Recorders Annex, Hollywood, March 19, 1958, Weston (arr, con) Harry "Sweets" Edison (t) Leonard Hartman, Matty Matlock. Ted Nash, or Fred Stulce (fl) Paul Smith (p) Barney Kessel (g) Joe Mondragon (vb; Alvin Stoller (d)
