= Lisbon (1956 film) =

1956 American crime film directed by Ray Milland

- Theatrical poster
- Directed by: Ray Milland
- Screenplay by: John Tucker Battle
- Story by: Martin Rackin
- Produced by: Herbert J. Yates; Ray Milland (Associate Producer)
- Starring: Ray Milland; Maureen O'Hara; Claude Rains; Yvonne Furneaux
- Cinematography: Jack A. Marta
- Edited by: Richard L. Van Enger
- Music by: Nelson Riddle
- Production company: Republic Pictures
- Distributed by: Republic Pictures
- Release dates: August 17, 1956 (United States); January 1, 1957 (Portugal)
- Running time: 91 minutes
- Countries: United States; Portugal
- Languages: English; Portuguese

Lisbon is a 1956 American film noir crime film produced and directed by Ray Milland and starring Milland, Maureen O'Hara, Claude Rains, Edward Chapman, and Jay Novello. An American smuggler based in Lisbon is hired to rescue a wealthy industrialist from behind the Iron Curtain.

The film was shot on location in Lisbon, Portugal, in Trucolor and Naturama for Republic Pictures. Nelson Riddle's score included a version of "Lisboa Antiga" that had been a top charting song prior to the film's release.

== Plot ==
The police inspector Fonseca is interested in two Lisbon men in particular, the wealthy and notorious Greek criminal Aristides Mavros and an American suspected smuggler with a fast boat, Captain Evans.

A number of beautiful women work for Mavros, including a secretary, Maria, who came to him for help when she was destitute. A menacing and jealous servant, Serafim, is secretly in love with Maria, but the attraction is not mutual.

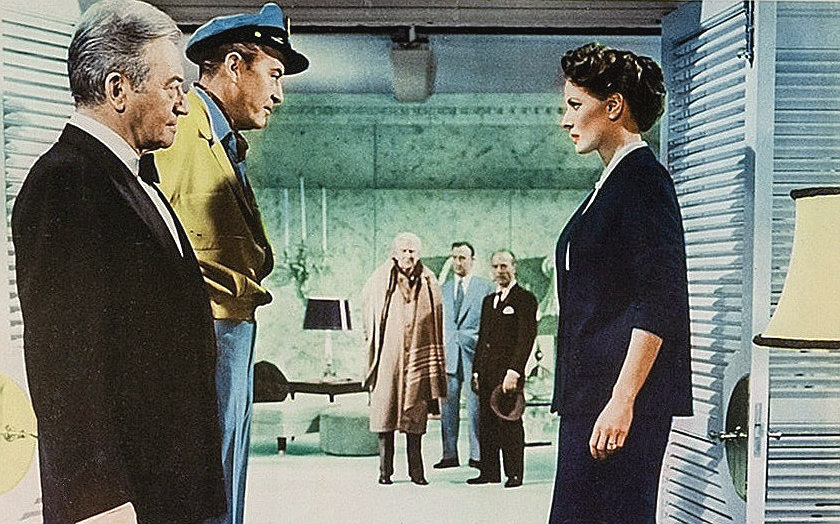
Main characters

Irish-born Sylvia Merrill, married to a much older millionaire Lloyd, is tired of waiting for government officials to rescue her husband, held as a prisoner behind the Iron Curtain. She offers a large sum of money to Mavros, who correctly surmises that Sylvia has an ulterior motive. If her husband dies without a will, it could take as long as seven years for her to inherit his wealth.

Evans is hired by Mavros to go after Lloyd in his boat. Having developed a romantic attraction to Maria, the American finds himself hated by Serafim, who attempts to kill him. Mavros gives his man permission to kill Evans during the rescue of Lloyd, and by now Sylvia is on board with the idea that Lloyd won't come back alive, either.

Evans manages to foil Serafim's plans and sees him fall to his death. Fonseca, having been tipped off by Maria, has an informer prepared to identify the smuggler, but to the policeman's surprise it is Mavros who is fingered as the culprit rather than Evans. A happy Maria has her man, while Sylvia is left with only a husband she has betrayed.

== Cast ==
- Ray Milland as Captain Robert John Evans
- Maureen O'Hara as Sylvia Merrill
- Claude Rains as Aristides Mavros
- Yvonne Furneaux as Maria Maddalena Masanet
- Francis Lederer as Serafim
- Percy Marmont as Lloyd Merrill
- Jay Novello as Inspector João Casimiro Fonseca
- Edward Chapman as Edgar Selwyn
- Harold Jamieson as Philip Norworth
- Humberto Madeira as Tio Rabio

== Production ==
=== Development ===
Lisbon was adapted from a short story by Martin Rackin. Reportedly, Paramount Pictures bought the rights to the story in 1951 and Irving Asher was in charge of the production. The topic of the film was sensitive under the Cold War perspective of the 1950s and there were initial concerns about how Paramount would deal with a story involving the Iron Curtain. Luigi Luraschi, Paramount's Head of Foreign & Domestic Censorship at the time, wrote a report to the CIA in January 1953 stating that "[Lisbon] could be messy if mishandled, but so far we have them thinking along the right track and this could be very useful to us. Shall watch very carefully."

Irving Asher hired director Nicholas Ray and, in early 1953, Joan Crawford was in talks to star as main character Sylvia Merril. Eventually, after several rewrites, the project was shelved as Asher and Crawford weren't sure about the strength of the script. Nicholas Ray and Joan Crawford went on to film the 1954 western Johnny Guitar.

Paramount then sold the rights to Republic Pictures and Herbert J. Yates hired Ray Milland for his second directorial effort and starring role in the film. After Milland's work on A Man Alone, Yates hired him to direct one film a year for four years.

Milland reportedly wanted A Man Alone co-star Mary Murphy for the female lead, a part which ultimately went to Irish actress Maureen O'Hara. In her 2004 autobiography, 'Tis Herself: A Memoir, O'Hara wrote about her role in Lisbon: "For the first time in my career I got to play the villain, and Bette Davis was right – bitches are fun to play."

In August 1955 Milland flew to Europe to scout locations.

=== Filming ===
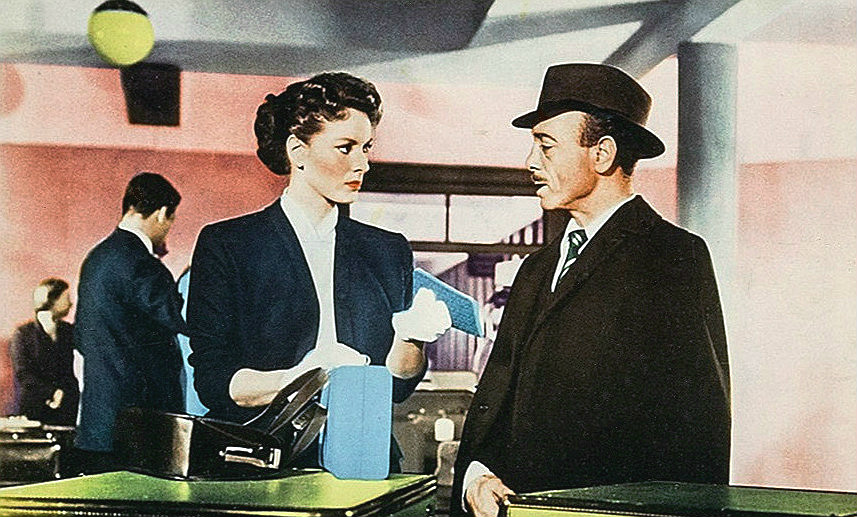
Maureen O'Hara and Jay Novello

Lisbon was entirely produced in the Portuguese capital city of Lisbon and its surrounding municipalities. It was considered the first Hollywood feature made in Portugal. For interior shots, the production used the facilities at Tobis Studios. Exterior shots included many locations in Lisbon, among them the Belém Tower, Praça do Comércio, the Castle of São Jorge and the Jerónimos Monastery. Outside the capital, there were seaside scenes filmed in Cascais and a scene at the belvedere of the Seteais Palace, in Sintra.

Cinematographer Jack A. Marta filmed using the Naturama anamorphic widescreen lens system, a format developed by Republic Pictures in the 1950s. Color filming was achieved using the Trucolor process, developed in the 1940s by Consolidated Film Industries (a division of Republic Pictures). Variety stated that "Lisbon makes a colorful setting" and "Republic's anamorphic Naturama process and Trucolor go a long way towards visual impressiveness."

=== Music ===
The song "Lisbon Antigua" was performed in the film by fado singer Anita Guerreiro, in a restaurant scene.

== Release ==
Lisbon had its premiere in Los Angeles on August 15, 1956 followed by wide theatrical release on August 17, 1956.

For the home market, the film was released on VHS Cassette in the 1990s, bearing the tagline "After Casablanca they all came to... Lisbon." As of late 2019 DVD and Blu-ray editions are available at amazon.com.

== Reception ==
Variety commented, "As a smooth, romantically-inclined American amusing himself with smuggling operations, [Ray Milland's] trouping comes off very well. As a production, the picture could have used a little sharper overseeing of story material" and concluded, "The starring foursome are quite glib and pleasing in the principal roles."

== See also ==
- List of American films of 1956
