= Vern Yocum =

American copyist and librarian (1909–1991)

- Born: George Vernon Yocum; April 15, 1909; Sunbury, Pennsylvania
- Died: September 13, 1991 (aged 82)
- Occupations: music copyist, music librarian

George Vernon "Vern" Yocum (April 15, 1909 – September 13, 1991) is best known as copyist and librarian for Frank Sinatra, Nat King Cole, and Nelson Riddle. Many of the top artists of the mid-20th century relied on Vern Yocum's Music Service, which was walking distance from the Capitol Records Tower. His client list included: Frankie Laine, Billy Eckstine, Ella Fitzgerald, Rosemary Clooney, Mel Tormé, Peggy Lee, Steve Lawrence & Eydie Gorme, Keely Smith, Sammy Davis Jr., Trini Lopez, Nancy Wilson, Leslie Uggams, Roy Clark, and Julie Andrews.

== Biography ==
Vern and his brother Clark (guitarist with Mal Halet and Tommy Dorsey and vocalist with The Pied Pipers) grew up singing and playing instruments in Pennsylvania Dutch Country until they were seduced by jazz. Vern left home two weeks before high school graduation to go on the road with Floyd Mills and the Marylanders and would subsequently play with many big bands, including Dorsey, Red Nichols, Chico Marx, and Boyd Raeburn.

During World War II he remained busy building big bands in the United States Navy. In the late 1940s, Vern began to rely more and more on doing music preparation on the West Coast, which was something that he had done to earn money while in bands directed by Dorsey and Boyd Raeburn. By 1950, he had completely transitioned into this field after managing and playing with The Bob Keane (Keene) Band.

Yocum contributed significantly to the cause of many working musicians when he, Cecil Reed, and eleven other top musicians openly rebelled against American Federation of Musicians President James Petrillo in a representation dispute during the mid-1950s. They hosted the first meeting of what was to later become the Musician's Guild of America in his office. Later he served on the negotiation team and successfully contracted changes which are still in force today. His collection resides at the University of Arizona.

Vern Yocum died of bladder cancer in 1991, aged 82.
