= Communication (Nelson Riddle album) =

Studio album by Nelson Riddle
- Released: 1971
- Recorded: September 1971
- Studio: Bavaria Tonstudio, Munich
- Genre: Jazz, Lounge music
- Length: 32:17
- Label: MPS
- Producer: Claus Ogerman, Willi Fruth

Nelson Riddle chronology
Nelson Riddle Conducts The 101 Strings (1970)	Communication (1971)	Changing Colors (1972)

Communication is a 1971 album by Nelson Riddle and his orchestra. It was Riddle's first album for German record label MPS, followed by Changing Colors in 1972.

== Reception ==
Professional ratings
Review scores
Source	Rating
Allmusic	4.5/5 stars

The Allmusic review by Jason Ankeny awarded the album four and a half stars and said the album is an "intoxicating mosaic of jazz, pop, and Latin elements...stands as a monumental testament to Riddle's consummate skill as an arranger and his almost alchemical faculty for creating a seamless whole from disparate parts".

== Track listing ==
1. "It's Your Turn" (Heinz Kiessling) - 3:17
2. "Uptown Dance" (Claus Ogerman) - 3:43
3. "Time and Space" (Erwin Lehn) - 2:11
4. "Romantic Places" (Willi Fruth) - 3:30
5. "Volcano's Daughter" (Rolf Hans Müller) - 3:18
6. "Rachel" (Horst Jankowski) - 2:54
7. "Born Happy" (Frank Pleyer) - 3:47
8. "A Night of Love" (Franz Grothe) - 2:52
9. "Dedication" (Georg Haentzschel) - 4:14
10. "Greenwich Village" (Rolf Cardello) - 2:31

== Personnel ==
- Willi Fruth - producer
- Claus Ogerman
- Nelson Riddle - conductor, arrangements
- Hubertus Mall - cover photo
- Willem Makkee - digital remastering
- Peter Kramper - engineer
- Stefan Kassel - reissue art, series design
- Matthias Kunnecke - reissue producer
- Stephan Steigleder - series consultant

== Re-Issue ==
In 1984, MPS released Nelson Riddle & His Orchestra - The Silver Collection, a compact disc compilation containing the 20 tracks released in Communication and its successor, Changing Colors.
