= Sea of Dreams (1958 album) =

Studio album by Nelson Riddle
- Released: 1958
- Recorded: 1958
- Studio: Capitol Records
- Genre: Traditional pop
- Label: Capitol ST-915

Nelson Riddle chronology
C'mon...Get Happy! (1957)	Sea of Dreams (1958)	The Joy of Living (1959)

Sea of Dreams was Nelson Riddle’s fifth studio album, released in March 1958.

== Conception ==
The inspiration for Nelson Riddle’s conception of the theme of Sea of Dreams was the setting of his California home on the shoreline of the Pacific Ocean. A departure from his previous albums that were composed of arrangements characterized as bright and danceable, Sea of Dreams consists of music said to be “especially moving and romantic,” performed by a large string orchestra.

Sea of Dreams was Riddle's first stereophonic recording. The stereo version of the album was released in August 1958.

== Album Cover ==
As Joseph Lanza wrote in his 2004 book Elevator Music, "The cover depicts a heavily cosmeticized sea nymph, seductive and sinister, inviting updated visions of the ancient association between the ocean and feminine mystery." The cover model may have been Diane Webber.

== Reception ==
Cash Box said Riddle takes “the listener on a slow mood excursion,” with “a lush string treatment to a dozen romantic selections.”

One reviewer observed that Sea of Dreams fell on “the romantic side of the Exotica genre.” “Instead of interweaving exotic percussion with the surroundings, Riddle concentrates exclusively on the strings, leaving a small niche for mallet instruments and bells of all kinds.”

== Track listing ==
=== Side 1 ===
No.	Title	Writer(s)	Length
1.	"Out of the Night"	Harry Sosnik, Walter Hirsch	2:39
2.	"My Isle of Golden Dreams"	Gus Kahn, Walter Blaufuss	2:23
3.	"Tangi Tahiti (The Call Of Tahiti)"	Leon Pober	2:31
4.	"Dream"	Johnny Mercer	2:54
5.	"There's No You"	George Durgom, Hal Hopper, Tom Adair	2:22
6.	"Drifting and Dreaming"	Egbert Van Alstyne, Erwin Schmidt, Haven Gillespie, Loyal Curtis	3:20

=== Side 2 ===
No.	Title	Writer(s)	Length
1.	"Easter Isle"	Lee Gillette, Nelson Riddle	2:43
2.	"Let's Fall In Love"	Harold Arlen, Ted Koehler	2:23
3.	"Polka Dots And Moonbeams"	James Van Heusen, Johnny Burke	3:13
4.	"Put Your Dreams Away (For Another Day)"	Mann, Ruth Lowe, Weiss	1:53
5.	"Autumn Leaves"	Jacques Prevert, Johnny Mercer, Joseph Kosma	3:13
6.	"Sea of Dreams"	Riddle	2:36
