= C'mon...Get Happy! =

C’mon . . . Get Happy!

Studio album by Nelson Riddle
- Released: 1957
- Recorded: 1957
- Studio: Capitol Records
- Genre: Traditional pop
- Length: 35:53
- Label: Capitol T-893

Nelson Riddle chronology
Hey...Let Yourself Go! (1957)	C’mon . . . Get Happy! (1957)	Sea of Dreams (1958)

C’mon . . . Get Happy! was Nelson Riddle’s fourth studio album, released in October 1957.

== Origin ==
C’mon...Get Happy! followed quickly on the heels of Riddle's “Hey...Let Yourself Go!,” which had been released six months earlier, in April 1957, and had enjoyed commercial success. The album liner notes characterized the new collection as “some of the brightest, most danceable music ever,” with “sparkling, up-tempo numbers.”

== Reception ==
One reviewer observed that “most of this album's 12 songs are upbeat and enthusiastic, and even the slower numbers boast a purposeful swing and the arrangements are punchy and gracefully embroidered with exceptional instrumental work from Riddle's studio orchestra.”

Like “Hey...Let Yourself Go!”, “C’mon...Get Happy!” reached number 20 on the Billboard chart.

== Track listing ==
=== Side 1 ===
No.	Title	Writer(s)	Length
1.	"Jeannine, I Dream of Lilac Time"	Nat Shilkret, L. Wolfe Gilbert	2:17
2.	"Without A Song"	Billy Rose, Edward Eliscu, Vincent Youmans	4:43
3.	"September In The Rain"	Al Dubin, Harry Warren	3:38
4.	"S'Posin'"	Andy Razaf, Paul Denniker	2:45
5.	"Am I Blue?"	Grant Clarke, Harry Akst	3:06
6.	"Rain"	Eugene Ford	2:38

=== Side 2 ===
No.	Title	Writer(s)	Length
1.	"I'll Get By (As Long As I Have You)"	Fred E. Ahlert, Roy Turk	2:56
2.	"Diga Diga Do"	Jimmy McHugh, Dorothy Fields	2:36
3.	"For All We Know 2:56"	J. Fred Coots, Sam M. Lewis	2:56
4.	"Time Was 2:48"	Miguel Prado, S.K. Russell	2:48
5.	"Something to Remember You By"	Arthur Schwartz, Howard Dietz	3:02
6.	"Get Happy"	Harold Arlen, Ted Koehler	2:38
