= More Hit TV Themes =

Studio album by Nelson Riddle
- Released: 1963
- Recorded: 1963
- Genre: Television theme music
- Length: 27:14
- Label: Capitol ST-1869
- Producer: Tom Morgan

Nelson Riddle chronology
Love is a Game of Poker (1962)	More Hit TV Themes (1963)	The Best of Nelson Riddle (1963)

More Hit TV Themes is the fifteenth studio album by American composer and arranger Nelson Riddle, and his last for Capitol Records.

== Origin and development ==
Released in April 1963, More Hit TV Themes is a successor to Route 66 Theme and Other Great TV Hits, released the year before. Both albums were outgrowths of the success of Nelson Riddle's instrumental "Route 66 Theme," which spent 12 weeks on the Billboard Hot 100 playlist in the summer of 1962, peaking at No. 30. When the theme was recorded, it seemed a natural to Capitol Records to create an album of other TV themes around it. Riddle had album producer Tom Morgan select the tunes.

The release of Route 66 Theme and Other Great TV Hits earned two Grammy nominations at the 5th Annual Grammy Awards, for the Grammy Award for Best Instrumental Theme and the Grammy Award for Best Instrumental Arrangement. The popularity of the Route 66 album, and the single that spawned it, prompted the second album of TV themes. Producer Morgan selected an additional dozen tunes from the top-ranked TV shows in 1963, including "The Beverly Hillbillies" (#1), "The Dick Van Dyke Show" (#3), "The Lucy Show" (#6), and "McHale's Navy" (#22).

Riddle's work as composer/conductor for the adventure drama television series "Route 66" led to his work as composer/conductor on the police crime drama television series "Naked City." The Route 66 album includes his arrangement of the TV show theme, composed by Billy May. Riddle composed a new theme for the program, which was used for the final season. More Hit TV Themes includes Riddle’s "New Naked City Theme."

== Reception ==
In its April 17, 1963, issue, Cash Box magazine acknowledged the heritage of More Hit TV Themes, commenting, "Nelson Riddle's previous package of TV themes quickly zoomed up the charts and this follow-up stanza has every indication of going a similar success route."

The Billboard magazine review from April 27, 1963, commented that "Riddle gives his usual imaginative and exciting treatment—both in arrangement and performance", and characterizes the album as an "apt follow-up to his last waxing of TV themes, [which] will without doubt outlive many of the TV shows Riddle has saluted so well".

Reflecting the lasting appeal of Riddle's contemporary treatment of television themes of the '60s, in 2002 EMI Gold/Capitol issued a CD in its "Two on One" series containing the tracks from both Route 66 Theme and Other Great TV Hits and More Hit TV Themes, 40 years after their original release.

== Track listing ==
=== Side 1 ===
No.	Title	Writer(s)	Length
1.	"Ballad of Jed Clampett"	(Paul Henning)	2:11
2.	"Bonanza Theme"	(Ray Evans - Jay Livingston)	2:07
3.	"Moon River"	(Henry Mancini)	2:20
4.	"Stoney Burke Theme"	(Dominic Frontiere)	2:13
5.	"McHale's Navy March"	(Axel Stordahl)	1:58
6.	"The Dickens and Fenster March"	(Irving Szathmary)	1:59

=== Side 2 ===
No.	Title	Writer(s)	Length
1.	"Supercar"	(Barry Gray)	2:07
2.	"Ballad of Paladin"	(Johnny Western, Richard Boone, Sam Rolfe)	2:07
3.	"Lucy Theme"	(Julian Davidson, Wilbur Hatch)	1:55
4.	"Bubbles in the Wine"	(Bob Calame, Frank Loesser, Lawrence Welk)	3:04
5.	"New Naked City Theme"	(Nelson Riddle)	2:24
6.	"Dick Van Dyke Theme"	(Earle Hagen)	2:17
