= Maria Sidónio =

Portuguese actress, singer, and ceramicist (1920-2007)

- Born: Maria Sidónio Baracho Damião; 13 July 1920; Lisbon, Portugal
- Died: 29 March 2007 (aged 86); Lisbon
- Resting place: Prazeres Cemetery, Lisbon
- Occupations: actress, singer and ceramic artist
- Spouse: Aníbal Nazaré
- Partner: Tony de Matos

Maria Sidónio Baracho Damião (July 13, 1920 – March 29, 2007) was a Portuguese actress, singer, and ceramicist.

== Early life ==
Sidónio was born in the Portuguese capital, Lisbon, on 13 July 1920.

== Acting and singing career ==
In 1943, Sidónio started to work with the Emissora Nacional, the forerunner of the Rádio e Televisão de Portugal (RTP), participating in numerous programmes, particularly the shows known as the Evenings for Workers. She then met and married Aníbal Nazaré, a writer of revues that were performed in the Parque Mayer theatre district of Lisbon. This gave her the opportunity to perform in several vaudevilles (known in Portugal as Teatro de Revista). In the same period, she made her film debut, participating in and singing in the film A Bride from Brazil (1945), directed by Santos Mendes. This was premiered at the Teatro Tivoli in Lisbon on 14 May 1945. She also became notable for performing at shows for charity. In the early 1950s she toured the country, taking under her wing the young actress, Anita Guerreiro.

== Brazil ==
After separating from Nazaré, Sidónio formed a relationship with the singer Tony de Matos, which lasted for around 20 years. In 1957 they left for Brazil and in 1959 opened a typical Portuguese restaurant in Copacabana, Rio de Janeiro, called O Fado This was organized in the same way as the fado houses in Lisbon, with pictures of monuments and cities of Portugal and with elements of the fado theme, such as a black shawl and a Portuguese guitar, and a painting of Maria Severa Onofriana, the first fado singer to become famous. De Matos performed at the restaurant every night, while Sidónio concentrated on management of the restaurant.

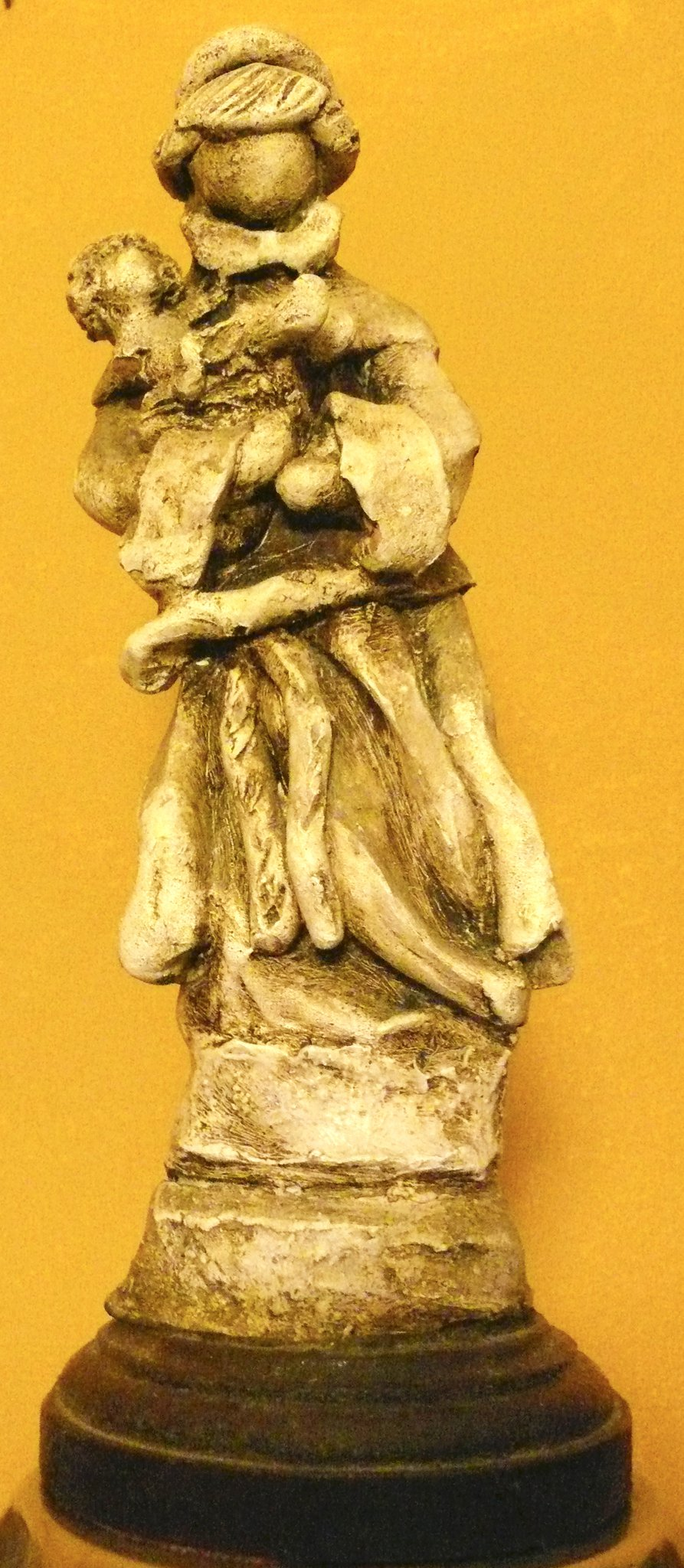
Statue of St. Anthony by Sidónio

== Ceramicist ==
After about seven years in Brazil, Sidónio returned to Portugal. While in Rio de Janeiro she had taken a course in ceramics and in Lisbon she began to produce and sell ceramics, concentrating on Saint Anthony and Nativity scenes. After its founding in 1981 by Vitor Seijo, she had a studio at Páteo Alfacinha, an area that offered a space for traditional commerce, as well as a restaurant, a chapel, a theatre, and places where artists could work. She also sold her work at a traditional People's Fair. With her unusual background and career progression, she was invited to take part in several television programmes.

== Death ==
In 2005, Sidónio moved into the Casa do Artista in Lisbon, a rest home for former artists. She died on 29 March 2007 and was buried in Lisbon's Prazeres Cemetery.
