= Sing a Song with Riddle =

Studio album by Nelson Riddle
- Released: 1959
- Recorded: 1959
- Genre: Traditional pop
- Length: 29:18
- Label: Capitol TAO-1259

Nelson Riddle chronology
| The Joy of Living (Nelson Riddle album) (1959) | Sing a Song with Riddle (1959) | Music of the Motion Picture "Can Can" (1960) |

Sing a Song with Riddle is the seventh studio album by American composer and arranger Nelson Riddle, released in 1959. The album consists of arrangements for a vocalist but without a singer; a lyric sheet was supplied with the original album package for buyers to sing along with at home. The inspiration for the release was a series of albums for amateur instrumentalists called Music Minus One on Command Records.

== Reception ==
Professional ratings
Review scores
| Source | Rating |
|---|---|
| Allmusic | 3/5 stars |

Reviewing the album for AllMusic, William Ruhlmann writes:

As mere listening experiences, many of these tracks are not actually recognized as the songs listed on the LP jacket, but no doubt they would be if Sinatra was singing over them. Sometimes, Riddle uses a bit of the melody, but much of the time, this remains background music that needs to be completed by someone else. It's a clever gimmick and a bit of joke, and it shows how far Riddle's treatments can stray from the lead sheets on occasion.

Ruhlmann concludes that "unless the buyer is standing by with the sheet music ready and a good voice to add on top", the album is an "incomplete experience".

== Track listing ==
=== Side 1 ===
| No. | Title | Writer(s) | Length |
|---|---|---|---|
| 1. | "Little White Lies" | (Walter Donaldson) | 1:47 |
| 2. | "Darn That Dream" | (Eddie DeLange, Jimmy Van Heusen) | 2:54 |
| 3. | "Near You" | (Craig Francis, Kermit Goell) | 2:49 |
| 4. | "Day In, Day Out" | (Rube Bloom, Johnny Mercer) | 2:05 |
| 5. | "The More I See You" | (Mack Gordon, Harry Warren) | 2:51 |
| 6. | "My Baby Just Cares for Me" | (Donaldson, Gus Kahn) | 2:05 |

=== Side 2 ===
| No. | Title | Writer(s) | Length |
|---|---|---|---|
| 1. | "Everywhere You Go" | (Mark Fisher, Joe Goodwin, Larry Shay) | 2:07 |
| 2. | "I Had the Craziest Dream" | (Gordon, Harry Warren) | 2:51 |
| 3. | "Fools Rush In" | (Bloom, Mercer) | 3:03 |
| 4. | "You Make Me Feel So Young" | (Gordon, Josef Myrow) | 2:08 |
| 5. | "It's a Sin to Tell a Lie" | (Billy Mayhew) | 2:51 |
| 6. | "You're Driving Me Crazy! (What Did I Do?)" | (Donaldson) | 1:47 |

== Personnel ==
- Nelson Riddle – arranger
