= NAT: An Orchestral Portrait of Nat "King" Cole =

Studio album by Nelson Riddle
- Released: 1966
- Recorded: 1966
- Genre: Traditional pop
- Length: 34:14
- Label: Reprise RS-6162
- Producer: Sonny Burke

Nelson Riddle chronology
Interprets Great Music, Great Films, Great Sounds (1966)	NAT: An Orchestral Portrait of Nat "King" Cole (1966)	Music for Wives and Lovers (1967)

NAT: An Orchestral Portrait of Nat "King" Cole is an album by American composer and arranger Nelson Riddle of music associated with the singer and pianist Nat King Cole. The album was released a year after Cole's death in 1965; Riddle had previously arranged several of Cole's albums.

== Origin ==
Nelson Riddle enjoyed a long and successful professional relationship with Nat King Cole. As his very first effort for Capitol Records, he arranged the singer's 1950 hit "Mona Lisa", and for the next 15 years the two collaborated on numerous singles and nearly a dozen LPs. A year after King Cole's death in 1965, Riddle arranged a tribute album of the singer's music. Riddle biographer Peter J. Levinson wrote:

[Riddle] had lost one of his closest friends and the man who had given him a golden opportunity to display his talent. As Nelson described it, 'Nat was my wedge.' Without Nat having taken a stand on his behalf, one can only speculate on the ultimate fate of Nelson's career.

== Reception ==
Professional ratings
Review scores
Source	Rating
AllMusic	3/5 stars
Record Mirror	3/5 stars

Reviewing the 2005 CD re-release of the album for AllMusic, Al Campbell wrote, "Although not essential, this is a respectable reissue that traditional pop fans should be aware of".

== Track listing ==
=== Side 1 ===
1. "Straighten Up and Fly Right" (Nat King Cole, Irving Mills) – 2:44
2. "Too Young" (Sylvia Dee, Sidney Lippman) – 2:55
3. "It's Only a Paper Moon" (Harold Arlen, Yip Harburg, Billy Rose) – 2:58
4. "Nature Boy" (eden ahbez) – 2:52
5. "Walkin' My Baby Back Home" (Fred E. Ahlert, Roy Turk) – 2:38
6. "Mona Lisa" (Ray Evans, Jay Livingston) – 3:03

=== Side 2 ===
1. "Night Lights" (Chester Conn, Gallop) – 2:34
2. "Pretend" (Dan Belloc, Lew Douglas, Frank LaVere, Cliff Parman) – 2:55
3. "Ballerina" (Sidney Russell, Sigman) – 2:38
4. "Sweet Lorraine" (Cliff Burwell, Mitchell Parish) – 3:10
5. "Ramblin' Rose" (Joe Sherman, Noel Sherman) – 2:40
6. "The Christmas Song (Merry Christmas to You)" (Mel Tormé, Robert Wells) – 2:57

== Personnel ==
- Nelson Riddle – arranger, liner notes
- Jimmy Rowles – piano
- Ed Thrasher – art direction
- Sonny Burke – record producer
