= This Magic Moment (disambiguation) =

"This Magic Moment" is a song written by Doc Pomus and Mort Shuman, originally performed by The Drifters

This Magic Moment may also refer to:

- This Magic Moment, album by Earl Grant
- This Magic Moment, an August 2013 Hallmark Channel Original Movie
- "This Magic Moment", a television episode of ESPN's 30 for 30 concerning the Orlando Magic
- "This Magic Moment" (Grey's Anatomy), a television episode from the series Grey's Anatomy
- This Magic Moment, a novel by Gregg Easterbrook
- This Magic Moment, a novel by Nora Roberts
- This Magic Moment, a short film by Lorraine Nicholson

== See also ==
- "That Magic Moment", a television episode of Dexter's Laboratory
- Magic Moment (disambiguation)
