= Interprets Great Music, Great Films, Great Sounds =

Interprets Great Music Great Films Great Sounds

Studio album by Nelson Riddle
- Released: 1964
- Recorded: 1964
- Genres: Film scores, pop
- Length: 28:38
- Label: Reprise R-6138
- Producer: Sonny Burke

Nelson Riddle chronology
Original Music from The Rogues (1964)	Interprets Great Music Great Films Great Sounds (1964)	NAT: An Orchestral Portrait of Nat "King" Cole (1965)

Interprets Great Music Great Films Great Sounds is an album by American composer and arranger Nelson Riddle of songs from contemporaneous motion pictures. The album also contains five songs from the 1935 Rodgers and Hart musical "Jumbo," as well as a Roger Edens song written for the 1962 film version of the same musical.

In the October 31, 1964, edition of Billboard magazine, Interprets Great Music Great Films Great Sounds was listed as a popular album with commercial potential. Cash Box magazine, in its November 7, 1964, issue, said Riddle's "flair for the inventive is standout on this collection of flick themes," and charactered the album as a superb programming package.

== Track listing ==
1. "Charade" (Henry Mancini, Johnny Mercer)
2. "Theme from Stowaway In The Sky" (Jean Prodromidès)
3. "Love Theme from Taras Bulba ("The Wishing Star")" (Franz Waxman)
4. "Love Song from Mutiny on the Bounty ("Follow Me")" (Bronisław Kaper)
5. "Sawdust and Spangles and Dreams" (Roger Edens)
6. "It's a Mad, Mad, Mad, Mad World" (Ernest Gold, Mack David)
7. "Little Girl Blue" (Rodgers, Hart)
8. "The Most Beautiful Girl In the World" (Rodgers, Hart)
9. "Over and Over Again" (Rodgers, Hart)
10. "My Romance" (Rodgers, Hart)
11. "This Can't Be Love" (Rodgers, Hart)

== Personnel ==
- Nelson Riddle – arranger
