= Changing Colors =

Studio album by Nelson Riddle
- Released: 1972
- Recorded: August 1971
- Studio: Bavaria Tonstudio, Munich
- Genre: Jazz, Lounge music
- Length: 31:05
- Label: MPS
- Producer: Claus Ogerman, Willi Fruth

Nelson Riddle chronology
Communication (1971)	Changing Colors (1972)	Vive Legrand! (1973)

Changing Colors is a studio album by Nelson Riddle and his orchestra, the second of two albums recorded for German record label MPS.

== Reception ==
Professional ratings
Review scores
Source	Rating
AllMusic	3.5/5 stars

The AllMusic review by Jim Dixon awarded the album three and a half stars. He said, "This record is probably more what you might have expected Riddle to be doing in 1971...orchestrating some of the more accessible pop songs of the day." He added, "It's well-done lounge music, recommended for serious fans of Riddle or lounge music, but there's not anything truly essential for a more general audience," concluding that Riddle's two MPS records are "high class background music in the end."

== Track listing ==
=== Side 1 ===
1. "My Life" (Claus Ogerman) – 2:13
2. "My Sweet Lord" (George Harrison) – 2:58
3. "Sao Paulo" (Nelson Riddle) – 4:05
4. "Close to You" (Burt Bacharach, Hal David) – 3:51
5. "My One and Only Love" (Robert Mellin, Guy Wood) - 3:11

=== Side 2 ===
1. "Lamento" (Antonio Carlos Jobim) – 3:05
2. "When the World Was Young" (Philippe Gerard, Johnny Mercer, Angele Vannier) – 3:34
3. "Naomi" (Nelson Riddle) – 3:23
4. "Just a Little Lovin'" (Barry Mann, Cynthia Weil) – 2:16
5. "Changing Colors" (Nelson Riddle) – 2:29

== Personnel ==
- Willi Fruth - producer
- Claus Ogerman - producer
- Nelson Riddle - conductor, arrangements
- MPS-Atelier - artwork
- Peter Kramper - engineer

== Re-Issue ==
In 1984, MPS released Nelson Riddle & His Orchestra - The Silver Collection, a compact disc compilation containing the 20 tracks released in Changing Colors and its predecessor, Communication.
