= Original Music from The Rogues =

Studio album by Nelson Riddle
- Released: 1964
- Recorded: 1964
- Studio: RCA Victor’s Music Center of the World
- Genre: Big band, pop
- Length: 30:30
- Label: RCA LSP-2976
- Producer: Joe Reisman

Nelson Riddle chronology
White on White, Shangri-La, Charade & Other Hits of 1964 (1964)	Original Music from The Rogues (1964)	Interprets Great Music, Great Films, Great Sounds (1964)

Original Music from The Rogues is a soundtrack album to the 1964 NBC television comedy-drama series "The Rogues", composed and conducted by Nelson Riddle.

== Conception ==
Four Star Television produced the show, which starred David Niven, Charles Boyer, and Gig Young, portraying members of a family of former conmen who conspired in each episode to fleece an unscrupulous villain. Thirty episodes of "The Rogues" were broadcast from September 1964 to April 1965.

Four Star Television music director Herschel Gilbert hired Riddle for the series, who had been heavily involved in scoring for weekly television, working on such shows as "Route 66", "Naked City", and "Sam Benedict."

The liner notes declare that the various themes reflected in the album capture “the essential spirit of the TV series: a rakish, pulsating vitality that constantly swings . . . at times deceptively, at other times, uninhibitedly.” The songs vary from “a driving uptempo, a lush bit of romanticism, [to] the foreign intrigue of a bossa nova.”

== Reception ==
The album was released in October 1964, after the premiere of the television series. Cash Box voted the LP one of its “Pop Best Bets,” with this thumbnail review:

Nelson Riddle, a past master at TV scoring, has created a delightful, varied score for “The Rogues,” the highly-touted ABC [sic] comedy-melodrama. The music which runs the gamut from jazz and blues to intricate classical constructions perfectly captures the spirit of the tongue-in-cheek series.

Billboard awarded the album a 3-star rating, reflecting its assessment that the album had moderate sales potential.

== Track listing ==
=== Side 1 ===
1. "From Rogues to Riches" 2:40
2. "Dame Margaret" 2:16
3. "Gig" 2:52
4. "Susie" 2:31
5. "Marcel" 2:17
6. "A Rogue in Rio" 2:08

=== Side 2 ===
1. "One for the Rogue" 2:48
2. "Chata" 3:29
3. "Timmy" 2:25
4. "Ilsa" 2:34
5. "Latin Lady" 2:15
6. "The Rogues" 2:15
