= The Riddle of Today =

Studio album by Nelson Riddle
- Released: 1967
- Recorded: 1967
- Studio: RCA Victor Studios, TTG Studios, Hollywood
- Genre: pop music
- Length: 30:46
- Label: Liberty LRP-3532/LST-7532
- Producer: Tommy Oliver

Nelson Riddle chronology
The Bright and the Beautiful (1967)	The Riddle of Today (1967)	The Contemporary Sound of Nelson Riddle (1968)

The Riddle of Today was Nelson Riddle's second, and last, album for Liberty Records, released in October 1967.

== Origin ==
Riddle had signed with Liberty in early 1967, and immediately released the album The Bright and the Beautiful. The Riddle of Today, his last for Liberty, followed later in the year. The liner notes observe that the Riddle approach to arranging music "is refreshing, direct and uncomplicated," and concludes that "there is nothing better than number one . . . and Nelson Riddle is 'IT'!"

== Reception ==
Billboard said the album presents a "pleasant pop mood," and rated it a "Special Merit Pick" – a release "of outstanding merit which deserve[s] exposure and which could have commercial success."

Cash Box portrayed the album as "right up to date from the cover to the back," giving "the powerful Nelson Riddle treatment" to pop tunes of the day.

In May 1968, The Riddle of Today was listed in Cash Box's Basic Album Inventory. The list identifies best selling pop albums other than those appearing on the magazine's Top 100 album chart, "top steady selling LP's, as well as recent chart hits still going strong in sales."

== Track listing ==
=== Side 1 ===
1. "Hurt So Bad" (T. Randazzo, R. Weinstein, B. Hart) 2:27
2. "Sunshine Superman" (Donovan) 3:06
3. "Don't Sleep In The Subway" (T. Hatch, J. Trent) 2:51
4. "Goin' Out Of My Head" (T. Randazzo, R. Weinstein) 2:39
5. "Hey Girl" (G.Goffin, C. King) 3:14
6. "Up, Up And Away" (J. Webb) 2:23

=== Side 2 ===
1. "Theme From 'Tarzan'" (N. Riddle) 2:35
2. "The Smothers Brothers' Theme" (N.Ames, M.Williams) 2:14
3. "Cortege" (N. Riddle) 3:08
4. "Chestnut Trees" (N. Riddle) 2:59
5. "Amy's Theme" (J.Sebastian) 3:10
