= Ella Fitzgerald Sings the Jerome Kern Song Book =

1963 studio album by Ella Fitzgerald

Studio album by Ella Fitzgerald
- Released: 1963
- Recorded: January 5–7, 1963
- Genre: Jazz
- Length: 43:00
- Label: Verve
- Producer: Norman Granz

Ella Fitzgerald chronology
Ella Sings Broadway (1963)	Ella Fitzgerald Sings the Jerome Kern Song Book (1963)	Ella and Basie! (1963)

Professional ratings
Review scores
Source	Rating
AllMusic	4.5/5 stars
Encyclopedia of Popular Music	4/5 stars
The Penguin Guide to Jazz Recordings	3/4 stars
Record Mirror	4/5 stars

Ella Fitzgerald Sings the Jerome Kern Song Book is a 1963 studio album by the American jazz singer Ella Fitzgerald accompanied by an orchestra arranged and conducted by Nelson Riddle. The album focuses on the songs of the composer Jerome Kern.

This was the second of Fitzgerald's Song Book series to have been orchestrated by Riddle; their previous collaboration was her George and Ira Gershwin Song Book in 1959. Fitzgerald and Riddle also recorded two albums of standards, Ella Swings Brightly with Nelson and Ella Swings Gently with Nelson, in 1962.

This was the seventh and penultimate album in Fitzgerald's Song Book series of songs written by musical theater composers; it was preceded by 1961's Ella Fitzgerald Sings the Harold Arlen Song Book and followed by Ella Fitzgerald Sings the Johnny Mercer Song Book in 1964.

The album was awarded four and a half stars by Down Beat magazine in 1963.

== Track listing ==
For the 1963 Verve LP release; Verve V6-4060; Re-issued in 2005 on CD, Verve B0003933-02

Side One:

1. "Let's Begin" (Otto Harbach) – 2:56
2. "A Fine Romance" (Dorothy Fields) – 3:36
3. "All the Things You Are" (Oscar Hammerstein II) – 3:15
4. "I'll Be Hard to Handle" (Bernard Dougall) – 3:47
5. "You Couldn't Be Cuter" (Fields) – 3:13
6. "She Didn't Say Yes" (Harbach) – 3:20

Side Two:

1. "I'm Old Fashioned" (Johnny Mercer) – 3:27
2. "Remind Me" (Fields) – 3:50
3. "The Way You Look Tonight" (Fields) – 4:28
4. "Yesterdays" (Harbach) – 2:51
5. "Can't Help Lovin' Dat Man" (Hammerstein) – 3:54
6. "Why Was I Born?" (Hammerstein) – 3:44

All music written by Jerome Kern with lyricists as indicated.

== Personnel ==
Recorded January 5–7, 1963 at Radio Recorders Studio 10H, Los Angeles:

Tracks 1,3,5-6 and 8

- Ella Fitzgerald - Vocals
- Don Fagerquist - Trumpet
- Caroll Lewis
- Dick Nash - Trombone
- George Seaberg
- Shorty Sherock
- Tommy Pederson
- Tommy Shepard
- George Roberts
- Plas Johnson - Tenor Saxophone
- Harry Klee - Woodwind
- Joe Koch
- Wilbur Schwartz - woodwinds
- Victor Arno - Violin
- Israel Baker
- Victor Bay
- Alex Beller
- Armand Kaproff - Cello
- Ray Kramer
- Dan Lube
- Erno Neufeld
- Lou Raderman
- Nathan Ross
- Alex Neimann - Viola
- Paul Robyn
- Barbara Simons
- Eleanor Slatkin - Cello
- Paul Smith - Piano
- Sidney Sharp
- Gerald Vinci
- Champ Webb
- Robert Bain - Guitar
- Joe Comfort - Double bass
- Frank Flynn - drums
- Alvin Stoller - Drums
- Nelson Riddle - Arranger, Conductor

On Tracks 2,4, and 7:

Personnel same as tracks 1,3,5-6, and 8 except Felix Slatkin and Marshall Sosson violin replace Don Lube and Sidney Sharp; Edgar Lustgarten cello replaces Ray Kramer; and add Ann Stockton on harp.
