= Route 66 Theme and Other Great TV Themes =

Studio album by Nelson Riddle
- Released: 1962
- Recorded: 1962
- Genre: Television theme music
- Length: 28:38
- Label: Capitol ST-1771
- Producer: Tom Morgan

Nelson Riddle chronology
Magic Moments from "The Gay Life" (1961)	Route 66 Theme and Other Great TV Themes (1962)	Love Is a Game of Poker (1962)

Route 66 Theme and Other Great TV Themes is the thirteenth studio album by American composer and arranger Nelson Riddle, named for Riddle's theme music from the television series "Route 66". The album was nominated at the 5th Annual Grammy Awards for the Grammy Award for Best Instrumental Theme and the Grammy Award for Best Instrumental Arrangement.

== Reception ==
The initial Billboard magazine review from September 15, 1962, commented that the tracks were "all played in a stylish fashion by the Riddle crew, and the sound is excellent".

== Track listing ==
=== Side 1 ===
1. "Route 66 Theme" – 2:07
2. "The Alvin Show Theme" – 2:22
3. "The Andy Griffith Theme" – 2:15
4. "Theme From 'Ben Casey'" – 1:40
5. "My Three Sons" – 2:22
6. "The Untouchables" – 3:08

=== Side 2 ===
1. "Naked City Theme" – 2:10
2. "Sing Along" – 2:39
3. "The Defenders Theme" – 2:47
4. "Theme From 'Sam Benedict'" – 2:29
5. "Theme From "Dr. Kildare"" – 2:26
6. "This Could Be the Start of Something" – 2:18

== Personnel ==
- Nelson Riddle – arranger
- Donn Trenner - Piano

== Reissues ==
In 1986, Capitol Records Special Markets released a tape cassette titled Route 66 and Other Great TV Themes, a nine-track compilation that omitted "The Alvin Show Theme," "Sing Along," "Theme From 'Sam Benedict'," and "This Could Be The Start of Something." It added "Dick Van Dyke Theme" (as "The Dick Van Dyke Show") from the second Riddle compilation issued in 1963, More Hit TV Themes.

In 2002 EMI Gold/Capitol issued a CD in its "Two on One" series containing the tracks from both Route 66 Theme and Other Great TV Hits and More Hit TV Themes, 40 years after their original release.
