= Hey...Let Yourself Go! =

Studio album by Nelson Riddle
- Released: 1957
- Recorded: 1957
- Studio: Capitol Records
- Genre: Traditional pop
- Length: 34:56
- Label: Capitol T-814

Nelson Riddle chronology
The Tender Touch (1956)	Hey...Let Yourself Go! (1957)	C'mon...Get Happy! (1957)

Hey...Let Yourself Go! was Nelson Riddle’s third studio album, released in April 1957.

== Origin ==
Riddle's first album consisted of a set of pop arrangements of Broadway tunes The Music from Oklahoma!, in 1955, followed by a collection of lush love songs The Tender Touch released a year later.

For Hey...Let Yourself Go!, Riddle assembled a dozen “carefree, up-tempo rhythms,” as the liner notes characterized them. "The twelve tunes presented here are an irresistible invitation to let yourself go and get on with the dance ... "

== Reception ==
Hey...Let Yourself Go! was well received. Cash Box characterized Riddle's work as "12 sparkling and inventive arrangements in dance tempo", and dubbed the album a "happy, rhythmic offering". The album was said to have captured Riddle's style "at its most frothy and effervescent", with "upbeat numbers that swing, but with an easygoing grace".

It reached number 20 on the Billboard chart.

At year's end, Hey...Let Yourself Go! was ranked the ninth most popular album of the year in the Billboard annual disk jockey poll.

== Track listing ==
=== Side 1 ===
No.	Title	Writer(s)	Length
1.	"Let's Face the Music and Dance"	Irving Berlin	2:29
2.	"You Are My Lucky Star"	Arthur Freed, Nacio Herb Brown	2:37
3.	"You and the Night and the Music"	Arthur Schwartz, Howard Dietz	3:35
4.	"Younger Than Springtime"	Richard Rodgers, Oscar Hammerstein II	3:27
5.	"You Leave Me Breathless"	F. Hollander, Ralph Freed	2:40
6.	"You're An Old Smoothie"	Buddy DeSylva, Lew Brown, Richard A. Whiting	2:21

=== Side 2 ===
No.	Title	Writer(s)	Length
1.	"Then I'll Be Happy"	Cliff Friend, Brown, Sidney Clare	2:28
2.	"I Get Along Without You Very Well"	Hoagy Carmichael	3:12
3.	"I Can't Escape From You"	Leo Robin, Whiting	3:02
4.	"Have You Got Any Castles, Baby?"	Johnny Mercer, Whiting	1:49
5.	"Darn That Dream"	Eddie DeLange, James Van Heusen	3:38
6.	"Let Yourself Go"	Berlin	3:10
