= White on White, Shangri-La, Charade & Other Hits of 1964 =

Studio album by Nelson Riddle
- Released: May 1964
- Recorded: 1964
- Genre: Pop
- Label: Reprise RS-6120

Nelson Riddle chronology
The Best of Nelson Riddle (1963)	White on White, Shangri-La, Charade & Other Hits of 1964 (1964)	Original Music from The Rogues (1964)

White on White, Shangri-La, Charade & Other Hits of 1964 is an album by American composer and arranger Nelson Riddle of popular contemporary songs. Released in May 1964, it was Riddle's first album for Reprise Records, after a lengthy career at Capitol Records.

== Reception ==
Cash Box magazine, in its 6 June 1964, issue, credited Riddle with "fresh and inventive arrangements for a dozen current and recent big hits on this instrumental offering," concluding that the album "has that money-in-the-bank sound."

Spencer Leigh, in his 2015 biography of Frank Sinatra, Frank Sinatra: An Extraordinary Life, framed Riddle's White on White as part of an attempt by Riddle to target the youth market, and critiqued the choice of "Kissin' Cousins" as nondescript.

The American Record Guide wrote that "Almost anyone with a bit of swing in his bones and an eager ear for good music must admit that Nelson Riddle leads one of America's better recording orchestras. The Man from Hollywood is at his best on White on White, Shangri-La, Charade, and Other Hits of 1964."

== Track listing ==
=== Side 1 ===
1. "Shangri-La" (Matty Malneck, Carl Sigman, Robert Maxwell)
2. "Charade" (Henry Mancini, Johnny Mercer)
3. "White on White" (Crane, Ross)
4. "Hello Dolly" (Jerry Herman)
5. "The Shelter of Your Arms" (Jerry Samuels)
6. "My True Carrie Love" (Frances, Romero)

=== Side 2 ===
1. "Java" (Allen Toussaint)
2. "Beautiful Obsession" (Friday, Allen Toussaint, Tyler)
3. "Kissin' Cousins" (Fred Wise, Randy Starr)
4. "I Wish You Love" (Léo Chauliac, Charles Trenet, Albert Beach)
5. "I Want to Hold Your Hand" (John Lennon, Paul McCartney)
6. "My Heart Cries for You" (Carl Sigman, Percy Faith)

== Personnel ==
- Nelson Riddle – arranger
- Unknown orchestra
