= Magic Moments from "The Gay Life" =

Studio album by Nelson Riddle
- Released: 1961
- Recorded: 1961
- Studio: Capitol Records
- Genre: Show tunes, traditional pop
- Label: Capitol ST1670
- Producer: Tom Morgan

Nelson Riddle chronology
Love Tide (1961)	Magic Moments from "The Gay Life" (1961)	Route 66 Theme and Other Great TV Themes (1962)

Magic Moments from "The Gay Life" is the twelfth studio album by American composer and arranger Nelson Riddle, consisting of music from Arthur Schwartz and Howard Dietz's musical "The Gay Life".

== Reception ==
The initial Billboard magazine review from February 17, 1962 described the album as a "tuneful mélange...the arrangements are never jarring and are sufficiently inventive and fresh sounding to add something to the original".

== Track listing ==
All music and lyrics written by Arthur Schwartz and Howard Dietz.

=== Side 1 ===
1. "Magic Moment" – 2:45
2. "Oh, Mein Liebchen" – 2:07
3. "Why Go Anywhere at All?" – 2:45
4. "Who Can? You Can?" – 2:47
5. "I'm Glad I'm Single" – 2:25
6. "This Kind of a Girl" – 2:26

=== Side 2 ===
1. "Something You Never Had Before" – 2:20
2. "Come A-Wandering with Me" – 2:39
3. "For the First Time" – 2:58
4. "The Bloom Is Off the Rose" – 2:44
5. "The Label On the Bottle" – 2:53
6. "Reprise: Magic Moment, Come A-Wandering with Me, Oh Mein Liebchen, Something You Never Had Before" – 3:51

== Personnel ==
- Nelson Riddle – arranger
