= Music of the Motion Picture "Can Can" =

Music of the Motion Picture “Can Can”

Studio album by Nelson Riddle
- Released: 1960
- Recorded: 1960
- Studio: Capitol Records
- Genre: Show tunes, traditional pop
- Length: 31:01
- Label: Capitol ST-1365
- Producer: Lee Gillette

Nelson Riddle chronology
Sing a Song with Riddle (1959)	Music of the Motion Picture “Can Can” (1960)	Original Music from The TV Show The Untouchables (1960)

Music of the Motion Picture “Can Can” was the Nelson Riddle Orchestra's eighth studio LP, released on Capitol records in 1960.

== Origin ==
Nelson Riddle arranged and conducted the Cole Porter music for the 1960 motion picture Can-Can. After completing work on the film, he arranged a dozen Porter melodies as dance music. The resulting album was released in the spring of 1960, ahead of Capitol's release of the soundtrack album.

The liner notes observe that Riddle “arranged and conducted the music for the soundtrack. In this album, Mr. Riddle has turned once more to the music of ‘Can-Can’ and arranged it all over again – this time for dancers, and for the many listeners who have enjoyed his other Capitol albums done in the same bright-sounding, smoothly swinging manner.”

== Reception ==
Cash Box noted that Riddle “proposes another side of the [film’s] melodies, as capable dance vehicles.” It called the arrangements “noticeably inventive,” and classified the album as a “swinging addition to the dance shelf.” Billboard placed the album in its “Special Merit Spotlight,” as a recording deserving the magazine's exposure.

The recording enjoyed renewed popularity when Capitol released it in a "Two on One" compact disc in 2005, paired with Riddle's 1955 release, The Music from Oklahoma!.

== Track listing ==
=== Side 1 ===
1. ”It's All Right With Me” 2:41
2. ”Allez-Vous-En, Go Away” 3:19
3. ”You Do Something To Me” 2:20
4. ”Maidens Typical Of France” 2:35
5. ”Let's Do It (Let's Fall In Love)” 2:53
6. ”Just One Of Those Things” 2:33

=== Side 2 ===
1. ”I Love Paris” 2:34
2. ”C'est Magnifique” 2:35
3. ”Come Along With Me” 2:40
4. ”Live And Let Live” 2:09
5. ”Montmart'” 2:39
6. ”Can Can” 2:03
