= The Joy of Living (Nelson Riddle album) =

Studio album by Nelson Riddle
- Released: 1959
- Recorded: 1959
- Studios: Capitol Records, Hollywood, California
- Genre: Traditional pop
- Length: 34:01
- Label: Capitol ST-1148

Nelson Riddle chronology
Sea of Dreams (1958)	The Joy of Living (1959)	Sing a Song with Riddle (1959)

The Joy of Living is the sixth studio album by American composer and arranger Nelson Riddle, released in 1959.

== Reception ==
Professional ratings
Review scores
Source	Rating
Allmusic	3/5 stars

William Ruhlmann reviewed the album for Allmusic and wrote that the arrangements "never get too lively or somber" and felt the casual, mid-tempo pieces were an assertion by Riddle of his stature with the popularity of Billy May and Gordon Jenkins. Ruhlmann felt the album was a precursor to Riddle's arrangements on Frank Sinatra's 1960 album Nice 'n' Easy as an "easygoing collection of small tonal joys".

Gramophone magazine described The Joy of Living as an "outstanding Riddle collection" upon its 1998 reissue.

== Single ==
Capitol Records released the title track "The Joy of Living" as a 45 rpm single, backed with a Nelson Riddle composition, "Somethin' Special."

== Track listing ==
=== Side 1 ===
No.	Title	Writer(s)	Length
1.	"Life Is Just a Bowl of Cherries"	Lew Brown, Nacio Herb Brown, Ray Henderson	2:08
2.	"You Make Me Feel So Young"	Mack Gordon, Josef Myrow	3:14
3.	"Makin' Whoopee"	Walter Donaldson, Gus Kahn	4:20
4.	"Bye Bye Blues"	David Bennett, Chauncey Gray, Frederick Hamm, Bert Lown	2:33
5.	"It's So Peaceful in the Country"	Alec Wilder	2:50
6.	"The Joy of Living"	Philip J. Davis	2:49

=== Side 2 ===
No.	Title	Writer(s)	Length
1.	"It's a Big Wide Wonderful World!"	John Rox	2:13
2.	"June in January"	Ralph Rainger, Leo Robin	2:13
3.	"Isn't This a Lovely Day"	Irving Berlin	2:46
4.	"Indian Summer"	Al Dubin, Victor Herbert	2:51
5.	"It's a Grand Night for Singing"	Oscar Hammerstein II, Richard Rodgers	2:49
6.	"I Got the Sun in the Morning"	Berlin	2:43

== Personnel ==
- Nelson Riddle – arranger
