= The Music from Oklahoma! =

Studio album by Nelson Riddle
- Released: 1955
- Recorded: 1955
- Studio: Capitol Records
- Genre: Show tunes, traditional pop
- Length: 36:53
- Label: Capitol T-596

Nelson Riddle chronology
The Music from Oklahoma! (1955)	The Tender Touch (1956)

The Music from Oklahoma! was Nelson Riddle's first studio album in his own right, released in 1955, after successful collaborations with Nat King Cole and Frank Sinatra for Capitol Records.

== Origin ==
The concept for the album stemmed from Capitol's release of the soundtrack from the motion picture Oklahoma!. Capitol's album chief F.M. Scott said the label was looking for "ancillary promotion for the film album," and gave Riddle a free artistic hand, saying "Do what you think is good."

The instrumental arrangements use voices, but not to sing the lyrics to the score. Instead, Riddle integrated them "as a part of the overall orchestral color." The principal voice was Norma Zimmer, who was used prominently on "Oh, What a Beautiful Mornin'."

== Reception ==
While not a commercial success, the album received enthusiastic reviews from the music industry. Billboard concluded that the "unusual treatment of the familiar score is both listenable and effective." Cash Box said Riddle "ought to have a hot item in this imaginary [imaginatively?] arranged album," adding that "Riddle has done a top job."

The recording enjoyed renewed popularity when Capitol released it in a "Two on One" compact disc in 2005, paired with Riddle's 1960 release, Music of the Motion Picture "Can Can".

== Track listing ==
=== Side 1 ===
1. "Oh, What a Beautiful Mornin'" 6:19
2. "The Surrey with the Fringe on Top" 2:51
3. "Kansas City" 2:58
4. "I Cain't Say No" 2:36
5. "Many a New Day" 3:07

=== Side 2 ===
1. "People Will Say We're in Love" 4:39
2. "Poor Jud Is Dead" 2:22
3. "Out of My Dreams" 4:08
4. "The Farmer and the Cowman" 2:29
5. "All Er Nothin'" 2:57
6. "Oklahoma" 2:27
