= Ella Swings Brightly with Nelson =

Studio album by Ella Fitzgerald
- Released: 1962
- Recorded: November 13–15, December 27, 1961
- Studio: Capitol (Hollywood)
- Genre: Jazz
- Length: 42:42
- Label: Verve V/V6-4054
- Producer: Norman Granz

Ella Fitzgerald chronology
Rhythm Is My Business (1962)	Ella Swings Brightly with Nelson (1962)	Ella Swings Gently with Nelson (1962)

Professional ratings
Review scores
Source	Rating
Allmusic	3/5 stars
Encyclopedia of Popular Music	4/5 stars
New Record Mirror	5/5 stars
The Penguin Guide to Jazz Recordings	3.5/4 stars

Ella Swings Brightly with Nelson is a 1962 studio album by the American jazz singer Ella Fitzgerald, accompanied by an orchestra arranged by Nelson Riddle.

This album is one of a pair that Fitzgerald and Riddle recorded and released in 1962, the other being Ella Swings Gently with Nelson. Fitzgerald and Riddle had last worked together on her 1959 album Ella Fitzgerald Sings the George and Ira Gershwin Songbook.

Fitzgerald's performance on this album won her the Grammy Award for Best Vocal Performance, Female at the 5th Annual Grammy Awards, this was Fitzgerald's seventh Grammy.

== Track listing ==
For the 1962 Verve LP release; Verve MG V-4054

Side One:

1. "When Your Lover Has Gone" (Einar Aaron Swan) – 3:00
2. "Don't Be That Way" (Benny Goodman, Mitchell Parish, Edgar Sampson) – 3:47
3. "Love Me or Leave Me" (Walter Donaldson, Gus Kahn) – 2:49
4. "I Hear Music" (Burton Lane, Frank Loesser) – 2:19
5. "What Am I Here For?" (Duke Ellington, Frankie Laine) – 2:43
6. "I'm Gonna Go Fishin'" (Ellington, Peggy Lee) – 3:00

Side Two:

1. "I Won't Dance" (Dorothy Fields, Oscar Hammerstein II, Otto Harbach, Jerome Kern, Jimmy McHugh) – 3:30
2. "I Only Have Eyes for You" (Al Dubin, Harry Warren) – 2:37
3. "The Gentleman Is a Dope" (Hammerstein, Richard Rodgers) – 3:58
4. "Mean to Me" (Fred E. Ahlert, Roy Turk) – 2:55
5. "Alone Together" (Howard Dietz, Arthur Schwartz) – 2:45
6. "Pick Yourself Up" (Fields, Kern) – 2:06

Bonus Tracks; Issued on the 1993 Verve CD re-issue, Verve 519 347-2

13. "Call Me Darling" (Dorothy Dick, Mart Fryberg, Rolf Marbot, Bert Reisfeld) – 2:34

14. "Somebody Loves Me" (Buddy DeSylva, George Gershwin, Ballard MacDonald) – 2:33

15. "Cheerful Little Earful" (Ira Gershwin, Billy Rose, Warren) – 2:06

- Track 13: Originally issued on 7" single; Verve 10248
- Tracks 14 and 15: Originally issued on the 1959 album Get Happy!; Verve V6-4036

== Personnel ==
Recorded from January 5, 1959 – December 27, 1961, at Capitol Studios, Hollywood, Los Angeles:

- Ella Fitzgerald – vocals
- Nelson Riddle – arranger, conductor
- Benny Green – liner notes
- Norman Granz – producer
