= Ella Swings Gently with Nelson =

Studio album by Ella Fitzgerald
- Released: 1962
- Recorded: November 13, 1961 – April 10, 1962
- Genre: Jazz
- Length: 47:48
- Label: Verve V4055
- Producer: Norman Granz

Ella Fitzgerald chronology
Ella Swings Brightly with Nelson (1962)	Ella Swings Gently with Nelson (1962)	Ella Sings Broadway (1962)

Ella Swings Gently with Nelson is a 1962 studio album by the American jazz singer Ella Fitzgerald, with an orchestra arranged and conducted by Nelson Riddle. This album is one of a pair, the other being Ella Swings Brightly with Nelson, that were released in 1962.

== Review ==
Professional ratings
Review scores
Source	Rating
AllMusic	3/5 stars
Encyclopedia of Popular Music	4/5 stars
New Record Mirror	4/5 stars
The Penguin Guide to Jazz Recordings	3/4 stars

In 1961, Ella Fitzgerald recorded two albums with Nelson Riddle's Orchestra. Her voice was in peak form and she was surrounded with the elegant arrangements of Nelson Riddle. The Nelson Riddle Orchestra was filled with the creme de la creme of Hollywood studio musicians of the era. Most were veterans of the top big bands of the 1940s and 1950s such as Conrad Gozzo on lead trumpet, Harry Edison playing solo trumpet, George Roberts on bass trombone. "All of Me" was from a different obscure sampler and "Call Me Darling" was previously unissued. Although the accent is on ballads, several of the songs are taken at medium tempos and she swings throughout. Highlights include "Georgia on My Mind", "The Very Thought of You", "It's a Pity to Say Goodnight", "Darn That Dream", "Body and Soul", and a cooking "All of Me".

== Track listing ==
For the 1962 Verve LP album, Verve MG V-4055

Side One:

1. "Sweet and Slow" (Al Dubin, Harry Warren) – 3:15
2. "Georgia On My Mind" (Hoagy Carmichael, Stuart Gorrell) – 3:29
3. "I Can't Get Started" (Vernon Duke, Ira Gershwin) – 3:33
4. "Street of Dreams" (Sam M. Lewis, Victor Young) – 3:12
5. "Imagination" (Johnny Burke, Jimmy Van Heusen) – 3:47
6. "The Very Thought of You" (Ray Noble) – 2:46

Side Two:

1. "It's a Blue World" (George Forrest, Robert C. Wright) – 2:44
2. "Darn That Dream" (Eddie DeLange, Van Heusen) – 2:31
3. "She's Funny That Way" (Neil Moret, Richard A. Whiting) – 3:14
4. "I Wished on the Moon" (Dorothy Parker, Ralph Rainger) – 2:44
5. "It's a Pity to Say Goodnight" (Mack Gordon, Billy Reid) – 2:34
6. "My One and Only Love" (Robert Mellin, Guy Wood) – 3:12
7. "Body and Soul" (Frank Eyton, Johnny Green, Edward Heyman, Robert Sour) – 3:44

Bonus Tracks; Issued on the 1993 Verve CD re-issue, Verve 519 348–2

14. "Call Me Darling" (Dorothy Dick, Mort Fryberg, Rolf Marbet, Bert Reisfeld) – 3:41

15. "All of Me" (Gerald Marks, Seymour Simons) – 3:22

- Track 14: Originally unissued outtake. (Take 3 was released as VK 10248, 45 rpm single. 1961.)
- Track 15: Originally issued on the 1963 various artists album All-Star Festival: A United Nations Unique Record to Aid the World's Refugees; UN 99500 DL

== Personnel ==
- Ella Fitzgerald – vocals
- Nelson Riddle – arranger, conductor
- Benny Green - liner notes
- Val Valentin – engineer
- Jay Thompson – cover photo
