= Lisbon Antigua =

Song

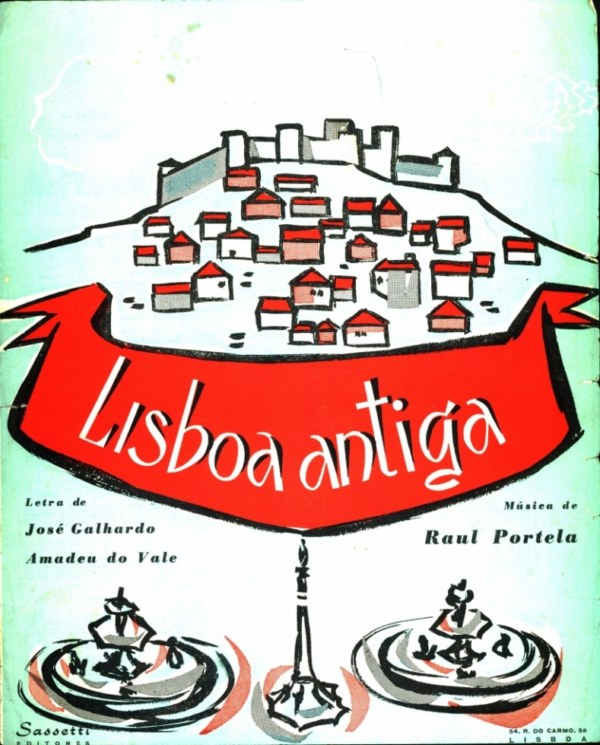
Sheet music cover. This uses the modern spelling antiga.

"Lisboa Antiga" (pronounced [liʒˈβoɐ ɐ̃ˈtiɣɐ]; Portuguese for 'Old Lisbon') is a Portuguese popular song that was originally written in 1937, with music by Raul Portela and Portuguese lyrics by José Galhardo and Amadeu do Vale. The song was recorded, among others, by Hermínia Silva and Amália Rodrigues. The version of song that ended being popular in the United States in the 1950s is called "Lisbon Antigua".

== Nelson Riddle recording ==
- "Lisbon Antigua" was a hit in the United States when recorded by the Nelson Riddle orchestra in 1956. It was brought to Riddle's attention by Nat King Cole's manager who had heard a version played by an orchestra in Mexico. Riddle recorded his own arrangement with himself on the piano accompanied by a string section, brass, and a wordless male chorus. "Lisbon Antigua" topped the Billboard magazine chart on February 25, 1956 and remained there for four weeks. The song became a gold record. Riddle then used the song for the theme music when he wrote the score for the 1956 film Lisbon. Billboard ranked it as the No. 3 song for 1956.

== Other recorded versions ==
- In 1956, Coral Records released "Lisbon Antigua" (US catalog# 9-61553, elsewhere as 'In Old Lisbon') with Alan Dale singing Harry Dupree's English lyrics. *In 1956, another popular version was recorded by Frank Chacksfield's orchestra under the title "In Old Lisbon", in which the male chorus sang lyrics written in English by Harry Dupree. It was released by the United Kingdom Decca label as catalog number F 10689, and reached #15 on the UK charts.
- In October 1956, the song made the French charts with Gloria Lasso's "Lisboa Antigua" and Darío Moreno´s "Adieu Lisbonne".
