= Nelson Riddle =

American arranger, composer, bandleader and orchestrator (1921–1985)

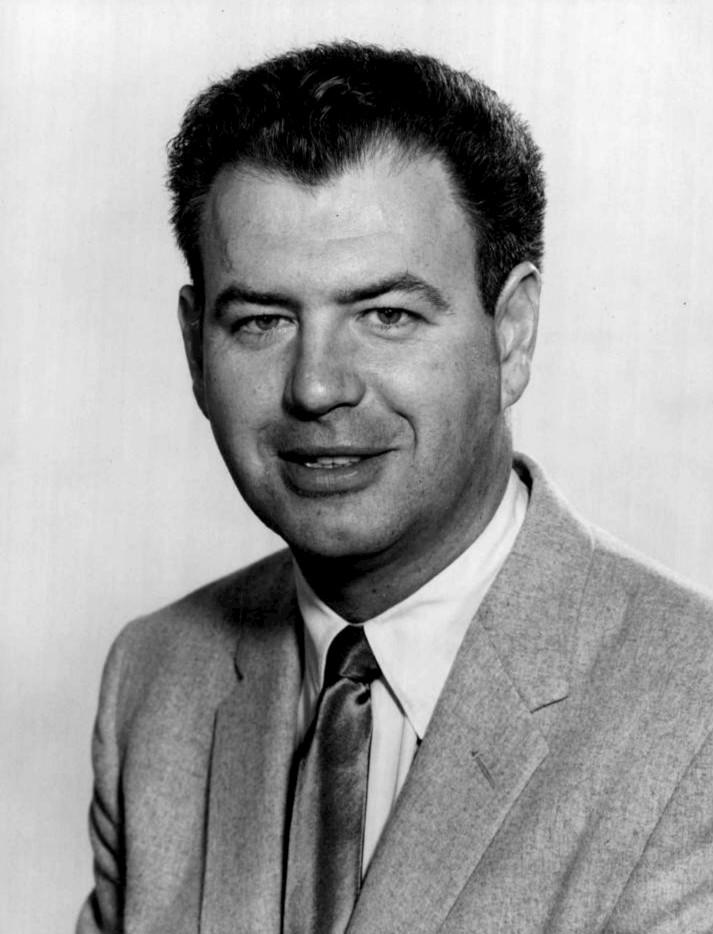
- Riddle in 1958

Background information
- Born: Nelson Smock Riddle Jr. June 1, 1921; Oradell, New Jersey, U.S.
- Died: October 6, 1985 (aged 64) Los Angeles, California, U.S.
- Genres: Traditional pop, jazz, big band, crime jazz
- Occupations: Arranger, composer, bandleader, orchestrator
- Years active: 1940s–1985
- Labels: Capitol, Liberty, Solid State, United Artists, Alshire, MPS, Capilano, Daybreak

Nelson Riddle
- Education: Rumson-Fair Haven Regional High School
- Spouses: Doreen Moran (m. 1945; div. 1970) Naomi Tenenholtz (m. 1970)
- Children: 6
- Family: Paula Wilcox (daughter-in-law)

Nelson Smock Riddle Jr. (June 1, 1921 – October 6, 1985) was an American arranger, composer, bandleader and orchestrator whose career stretched from the late 1940s to the mid-1980s. He worked with many vocalists at Capitol Records, including Frank Sinatra, Ella Fitzgerald, Nat King Cole, Judy Garland, Dean Martin, Peggy Lee, Johnny Mathis, Rosemary Clooney and Keely Smith. He scored and arranged music for many films and television shows, earning an Academy Award and three Grammy Awards. He found commercial and critical success with a new generation in the 1980s, in a trio of platinum albums with Linda Ronstadt.

== Early years ==
Riddle was born on June 1, 1921, in Oradell, New Jersey. He was the only surviving child of Marie Albertine Riddle (a native of Mulhouse, France, whose father was Spanish) and Nelson Smock Riddle, who was of English-Irish and Dutch descent. His mother had suffered six miscarriages and one stillbirth in her lifetime. It was his mother's second marriage. The family later moved to nearby Ridgewood.

Following his father's interest in music, he began taking piano lessons at age eight and trombone lessons at age fourteen. He was encouraged to continue his musical pursuits at Ridgewood High School.

A formative experience was hearing Serge Koussevitsky and the Boston Symphony Orchestra playing Maurice Ravel's Boléro. Riddle said later: "... I've never forgotten it. It's almost as if the orchestra leaped from the stage and smacked you in the face ..."

By his teenage years, Riddle had decided to become a professional musician; "... I wanted to be a jazz trombone player, but I didn't have the coordination." So he began to turn to composing and arranging.

The Riddle family had a summer house in Rumson, New Jersey. Riddle enjoyed Rumson so much that he convinced his parents to allow him to attend his senior year in high school there (1938).

In Rumson while playing for trumpeter Charlie Briggs' band, the Briggadiers, he met one of the most important influences on his later arranging style: Bill Finegan, with whom he began arranging lessons. Despite being only four years older than Riddle, Finegan was considerably more musically sophisticated, and within a few years Riddle was creating not only some of the most popular arrangements from the swing era, such as Glenn Miller's "Little Brown Jug", but also great jazz arrangements such as Tommy Dorsey's "Chloe" and "At Sundown" from the mid-1940s.

After his graduation from Rumson High School, Riddle spent his late teens and early twenties playing trombone in and occasionally arranging for various local dance bands, culminating in his association with the Charlie Spivak Orchestra. In 1943, Riddle joined the Merchant Marine, serving at Sheepshead Bay, New York for about two years while continuing to work for the Charlie Spivak Orchestra.

Riddle studied orchestration under his fellow merchant mariner, composer Alan Shulman. After his enlistment term ended, Riddle traveled to Chicago to join Tommy Dorsey's orchestra in 1944, where he remained the orchestra's third trombone for eleven months until drafted by the Army in April 1945, shortly before the end of World War II. He was discharged in June 1946, after fifteen months of active duty. He moved shortly thereafter to Hollywood to pursue a career as an arranger, and spent the next several years writing arrangements for multiple radio and record projects. In May 1949, Doris Day had a No. 2 hit, "Again", backed by Riddle.

== Capitol years ==
In 1950, Riddle was hired by composer Les Baxter to write arrangements for a recording session with Nat King Cole; this was one of Riddle's first associations with Capitol Records. Although one of the songs Riddle had arranged, "Mona Lisa", soon became the biggest selling single of Cole's career, the work was credited to Baxter. However, once Cole learned the identity of the arrangement's creator, he sought out Riddle's work for other sessions, and thus began a fruitful partnership that furthered the careers of both men at Capitol.

During the same year, Riddle also formed a friendship with Vern Yocum (born George Vernon Yocum), a big band jazz musician (and brother of Pied Piper Clark Yocum) who would transition into music preparation for Frank Sinatra and other entertainers at Capitol Records. A collaboration followed, with Vern becoming Riddle's "right hand" as copyist and librarian for the next thirty years.

In 1953, Capitol Records executives viewed the up-and-coming Riddle as a prime choice to arrange for Frank Sinatra. Sinatra was reluctant however, preferring instead to remain with Axel Stordahl, his long-time collaborator from his Columbia Records years. When success of the first few Capitol sides with Stordahl proved disappointing, Sinatra eventually relented and Riddle was called in to arrange his first session for Sinatra, held on April 30, 1953. Riddle drew on Sinatra's rhythm section, led by drummer/percussionist Irving Cottler (who was the featured drummer on Cole's "Mona Lisa"). The first product of the Riddle–Sinatra partnership, "I've Got the World on a String", became a runaway hit and is often credited with relaunching the singer's slumping career. Riddle's personal favorite was a Sinatra ballad album, one of his most successful recordings, Only the Lonely.

For the next decade, Riddle continued to arrange for Sinatra and Cole, in addition to such Capitol artists as Kate Smith, Judy Garland, Dean Martin, Keely Smith, Sue Raney and Ed Townsend. He also found time to record his own instrumental discs, released on Capitol in both 45 rpm single, and LP album format. Riddle's most successful tune was "Lisbon Antigua", released in November 1955, which reached and remained at the No. 1 position for four weeks in 1956. Riddle's most notable LPs were Hey ... Let Yourself Go (1957) and C'mon ... Get Happy (1958), both of which peaked at a respectable number twenty on the Billboard charts. In 1959, he won the Grammy Award for Best Musical Composition First Recorded and Released in 1958 (over five minutes' duration) at the inaugural award ceremony for Cross Country Suite, which was composed for former bandmate Buddy DeFranco.

While at Capitol, Riddle continued his successful career arranging music for film, most notably with MGM's Conrad Salinger on the first onscreen duet between Bing Crosby and Sinatra in High Society (1956), and the 1957 film version of Pal Joey directed by George Sidney for Columbia Pictures.

== Later years ==
Nelson Riddle Conducts The 101 Strings cover

In 1957, Riddle and his orchestra were featured on The Rosemary Clooney Show, a 30-minute syndicated program.

In 1962, Riddle orchestrated two albums for Ella Fitzgerald, Ella Swings Brightly with Nelson and Ella Swings Gently with Nelson, their first work together since 1959's Ella Fitzgerald Sings the George and Ira Gershwin Song Book. The mid-1960s would also see Fitzgerald and Riddle collaborate on the last of Ella's Songbooks, devoted to the songs of Jerome Kern (Ella Fitzgerald Sings the Jerome Kern Song Book) and Johnny Mercer (Ella Fitzgerald Sings the Johnny Mercer Song Book).

In 1963, Riddle joined Sinatra's newly established label Reprise Records, under the musical direction of Morris Stoloff. The following year, Riddle partnered with Tom Jobim, who is considered to be one of the great exponents of Brazilian music and one of the main founders of the bossa nova movement. The record, titled The Wonderful World of Antônio Carlos Jobim, was released in 1965.

In 1966, Riddle was hired by television producer William Dozier to create the music for the Batman television series starring Adam West. (Neal Hefti had written the Batman theme song and was originally hired for the series, but became unavailable.) Riddle did the first two seasons of Batman (sans two episodes scored by Warren Barker), along with the theatrically released Batman: The Movie. Billy May did the third season's music. Re-recordings of Riddle's music from Batman were issued on one soundtrack LP and a 45 rpm single. There was a "Batmanesque" tone in the soundtrack for Howard Hawks' John Wayne film El Dorado, also scored by Riddle in 1966, due to his continued heavy use of brass.

Riddle was the musical director for 16 episodes of The Smothers Brothers Comedy Hour between 1967 and 1969. His television work in the 1960s included his hit theme song and incidental music for Route 66, The Untouchables and The Rogues. His film work in the 1960s included the scores for the Rat Pack motion pictures Robin and the 7 Hoods and the original Ocean's 11. In 1969, he arranged and conducted the music to the film Paint Your Wagon.

In the latter half of the 1960s, the partnership between Riddle and Frank Sinatra grew more distant as Sinatra began increasingly to turn to Don Costa, Billy May and an assortment of other arrangers for his album projects. Although Riddle would write various arrangements for Sinatra until the late 1970s, Strangers In The Night, released in 1966, was the last full album project the pair completed together. The collection of Riddle-arranged songs was intended to expand on the success of the title track, which had been a number one hit single for Sinatra arranged by Ernie Freeman.

Nelson Riddle Conducts The 101 Strings was recorded in London in 1970. Riddle had been without a recording contract for the first time in more than 25 years. It had been two years since his Liberty Records contract ended. That year, he flew to London and recorded an album with the 101 Strings Orchestra. Produced by Jack Dorsey, it was released on Marble Arch Records. Biographer Peter J. Levinson offered a sober assessment of the project, arguing that Riddle was "out of his depth" with the fusion of contemporary and classical instrumentation. The album went through several re-issues on the Alshire label (including Nelson Riddle Arranges and Conducts 101 Strings (1970); Bridge Over Troubled Water (1971); and Swingin' Songs (1972), minus "Bridge Over Troubled Water") and the Vogue Records label.

During the 1970s, Riddle's film and television efforts included the nostalgic adaptation score for the 1974 version of The Great Gatsby, which earned him his first Academy Award, after five nominations. In 1973, he served as musical director for the Emmy Award-winning The Julie Andrews Hour. He wrote the theme songs for the 1972 television series Emergency! and the 1975 television series Caribe, and scored the 1977 miniseries Seventh Avenue. The Nelson Riddle Orchestra also made numerous concert appearances throughout the 1970s, some of which were led and contracted by his good friend, Tommy Shepard.

In March 1977, Riddle arranged and conducted his last arrangements for Sinatra. "Nancy", "Emily", "Linda", "Sweet Lorraine" and "Barbara" were intended for an album of songs with women's names. For this Sinatra project Riddle also wrote an arrangement of "Tina". The album was never completed. "Sweet Lorraine" was released in 1990 and the others were included in The Complete Reprise Studio Recordings, released in 1995. In 1978, Riddle was musical director for the 50th Academy Awards ceremony, the only occasion on which he performed the task.

In December 1979, Sinatra recorded Riddle’s string arrangement of "Something" for the 1980 album "Trilogy". And in 1981 Sinatra recorded Riddle’s arrangement of "The Gal That Got Away" with "It Never Entered My Mind" for the album "She Shot Me Down". The final time these two men worked together was when Nelson conducted for Frank at the Presidential Inaugural Gala in January 1985. 1982 saw Riddle work for the last time with Ella Fitzgerald, on her last orchestral Pablo album, The Best Is Yet to Come.

Riddle had composed most of the incidental music for Newhart (whose theme music was composed by Henry Mancini); the show's 71st episode was dedicated to his memory.

== Career revival ==
In the spring of 1982, Riddle was approached by Linda Ronstadt—via telephone through her manager and producer, Peter Asher—to write arrangements for an album of jazz standards that Ronstadt had been contemplating since her stint in The Pirates of Penzance. The agreement between the two resulted in a three-album contract which included what were to be the last arrangements of Riddle's career, with the exception of an album of twelve Great American Songbook standards he arranged and conducted for his old friend, opera singer Kiri Te Kanawa, in April 1985, six months before his death that October. Ronstadt recalls that when she initially approached Riddle, she did not know if he was even familiar with her music. He knew her name, but basically hated rock 'n' roll. However, his daughter was a big Linda Ronstadt fan and told her father, "Don't worry, Dad. Her checks won't bounce."

When Riddle learned of Ronstadt's desire to learn more about traditional pop music and agreed to record with her, he insisted on a complete album or nothing. He explained to Ronstadt that he had once turned down Paul McCartney, who had sought him out to write an arrangement for one of McCartney's albums, "I just couldn't do it. You can't put something like that in the middle of a bunch of other things. The mood comes and then it changes. It's like putting a picture in a bad frame." Riddle was at first skeptical of Ronstadt's proposed project, but once he agreed, his career turned around immediately. For her to do "elevator music", as she called it, was a great surprise to the young audience. Joe Smith, the president of Elektra, was terrified that the albums would turn off the rock audience. The three albums together sold over seven million copies and brought Riddle back to a young audience during the last three years of his life. Arrangements for Linda Ronstadt's What's New (1983) and Lush Life (1984) won Riddle his second and third Grammy Awards.

On January 19, 1985, Riddle conducted at the nationally televised 50th Presidential Inaugural Gala, the day before the second inauguration of Ronald Reagan. The program was hosted by Frank Sinatra, who sang "Fly Me to the Moon" and "One for My Baby (and One More for the Road)" (backed by a solo dance routine by Mikhail Baryshnikov).

Working with Ronstadt, Riddle brought his career back into focus in the last three years of his life. Stephen Holden of The New York Times wrote that What's New "isn't the first album by a rock singer to pay tribute to the golden age of pop, but is ... the best and most serious attempt to rehabilitate an idea of pop that Beatlemania and the mass marketing of rock LPs for teen-agers undid in the mid-60s ... In the decade prior to Beatlemania, most of the great band singers and crooners of the 40s and 50s codified a half-century of American pop standards on dozens of albums ... many of them now long out-of-print." What's New is the first album by a rock singer to have major commercial success in rehabilitating the Great American Songbook.

Riddle's third and final Grammy was awarded posthumously—and accepted on his behalf by Linda Ronstadt just prior to airtime—in early 1986. Ronstadt subsequently presented the evening's first on-air award, at which time she narrated a tribute to the departed maestro.

== Personal life ==
Riddle married his first wife, Doreen Moran, on October 10, 1945, while in the Army. The couple had seven children.

Riddle had an extramarital affair with singer Rosemary Clooney in the 1960s, which contributed to the breakup of their respective marriages. In 1968, Riddle separated from his wife Doreen; their divorce became official in 1970. A few months later he married Naomi Tenenholtz, who was then his secretary, with whom he would remain for the rest of his life. Riddle's eldest son Nelson III resides in London, England, and is married to British actress Paula Wilcox.

In a 1982 radio interview on WNEW with Jonathan Schwartz, Riddle cited Stan Kenton's "23°N — 82°W" arranged by Bill Russo as inspiration for his signature trombone interplay crescendos.

In 1985, Riddle died in Los Angeles, at Cedars-Sinai Medical Center, at age 64 of cardiac and kidney failure as a result of cirrhosis, with which he had been diagnosed five years earlier. His cremated remains are inurned at Hollywood Forever Cemetery in Hollywood, California in the Hall of David Mausoleum.

== Legacy ==
Following Riddle's death, his last three arrangements for Linda Ronstadt's For Sentimental Reasons album were conducted by Terry Woodson; the album was released in 1986. In February 1986, Riddle's youngest son Christopher, himself an accomplished bass trombonist, assumed the leadership of his father's orchestra.

Following the death of Riddle's second wife Naomi in 1998, proceeds from the sale of the Riddle home in Bel Air were used to establish a Nelson Riddle Endowed Chair and library at the University of Arizona, which officially opened in 2001. The opening showcased a gala concert of Riddle's works, with Ronstadt as a featured guest performer.

In 2000, Erich Kunzel and the Cincinnati Pops released a Nelson Riddle tribute album on Telarc Records titled Route 66: That Nelson Riddle Sound. The album showcased expanded orchestral adaptations of the original arrangements provided by the Nelson Riddle Archives, and was presented in a state-of-the-art digital recording that was among the first titles to be released on multi-channel SACD.

In November 2025, it was announced that an arrangement by Nelson Riddle of the song "How Did She Look?" - written by Harold Arlen and Johnny Mercer - was nominated for a Grammy Award for Best Arrangement, Instrumental and Vocals, performed by Seth MacFarlane. The version by MacFarlane was originally arranged by Riddle for Frank Sinatra's intended album Frank Sinatra Sings for Only the Lonely, but the song was ultimately not used on that album. It was Riddle's first Grammy nomination in 40 years.

== Selected filmography ==
- Flame of the Islands (1956)
- Lisbon (1956)
- Johnny Concho (1956)
- A Hole in the Head (1959)
- Li'l Abner (1959)
- Ocean's 11 (1960)
- Lolita (1962)
- Come Blow Your Horn (1963)
- 4 for Texas (1963)
- Paris When It Sizzles (1964)
- What a Way to Go! (1964)
- Robin and the 7 Hoods (1964)
- Harlow (1965)
- Marriage on the Rocks (1965)
- A Rage to Live (1965)
- Red Line 7000 (1965)
- Batman (1966)
- El Dorado (1966)
- The Spy in the Green Hat (1966)
- The Maltese Bippy (1969)
- The Great Bank Robbery (1969)
- The Blue Knight (series) (1975)
- The Great Gatsby (1974)
- How to Break Up a Happy Divorce (1976)
- Harper Valley PTA (1978)
- Goin' Coconuts (1978)
- Rough Cut (1980)
- Chattanooga Choo Choo (1984)

== Bibliography ==
- Levinson, Peter J. (2005). September in the Rain: The Life of Nelson Riddle. Taylor Trade Publications. ISBN 978-1-58979-163-3.
- Riddle, Nelson (1985). Arranged by Nelson Riddle. Alfred Music. ISBN 978-0897249546.
