= Lee Hazlewood discography =

This article presents the discography of American country-pop musician Lee Hazlewood as a recording artist. His songwriting credits on recordings by other musicians are not included here.

== Albums ==
=== Main albums ===
Album details	Reissue details
Trouble Is a Lonesome Town: Released: January 1963; Label: Mercury Records	LHI Records, 1969; Smells Like Records, 1999; Light in the Attic Records, 2013
The N.S.V.I.P.'s (Not...So...Very...Important...People): Released: October 1964; Label: Reprise Records	1972 Records, 2014
Friday's Child: Released: May 1965; Label: Reprise Records	1968 as Houston on Columbia/Harmony, 1972 Records, 2014
The Very Special World Of Lee Hazlewood: Released: 1966; Label: MGM Records	Water, 2007; Light in the Attic, 2015
Lee Hazlewood Presents The 98% American Mom & Apple Pie 1929 Crash Band: Released: 1967; Label: LHI Records	
Lee Hazlewoodism: Its Cause And Cure: Released: 1967; Label: MGM Records	Water, 2007; Light in the Attic, 2015
Something Special: Released: 1968; Label: MGM Records	Light in the Attic, 2015
Love and Other Crimes: Released: June 1968; Label: Reprise Records	1972 Records, 2014
Forty: Released: 1969; Label: LHI Records	Light in the Attic, 2017
Cowboy in Sweden: Released: May 1969; Label: LHI Records	Smells Like Records, 1999; Light in the Attic, 2016
Requiem for an Almost Lady: Released: 1971; Label: Viking Records / Reprise / LHI	Smells Like Records, 1999; Light in the Attic, 2017
13: Released: September 1972; Label: Viking / LHI	Smells Like Records, 1999; Light in the Attic, 2017
Poet, Fool or Bum: Released: 1973; Label: Capitol Records	EMI, 2004
I'll Be Your Baby Tonight: Released: 1973; Label: Viking	
The Stockholm Kid: Released: 1974; Label: CBS Records	
A House Safe For Tigers: Released: 1975; Label: CBS Records	Light in the Attic, 2012
20th Century Lee: Released: 1975; Label: RCA Victor	
Movin' On: Released: 1977; Label: Polydor	Ace Records, 2009
Back On The Street Again: Released: 1977; Label: EMI Records	EMI, 2004
For Every Solution There's A Problem: Released: June 2002; Label: City Slang	
Cake or Death: Released: December 2006; Label: EMI Records	

=== Collaborations ===
Album details	Reissue details
The Cowboy and the Lady (with Ann-Margret): Released: 1969; Label: LHI Records	Smells Like Records, 2000; Light in the Attic, 2017
Nancy & Lee (with Nancy Sinatra): Released: 1968; Label: Reprise Records; Certification: Gold (RIAA, U.S.)	Rhino Records, 1989
Nancy & Lee Again (with Nancy Sinatra) (also released as Did You Ever?): Released: 1972; Label: RCA Records	
Gypsies & Indians (with Anna Hanski): Released: 1993; Label: Selecta Records	
Farmisht, Flatulence, Origami, ARF!!! And Me... (with The Al Casey Combo): Released: 1999; Label: Smells Like Records	
Nancy / Lee 3 (with Nancy Sinatra): Released: 2004; Label: Warner Music Australia	

== Production and songwriting ==
Year	Title	Artist	Details
1958	Have 'Twangy' Guitar Will Travel	Duane Eddy	Producer, co-composer
1959	Especially for You	Duane Eddy	Producer, co-composer
1959	The "Twangs" The "Thang"	Duane Eddy	Producer, co-composer
1960	Sings	Johnny Burnette	Writer of "The Fool"
1960	"I'm On My Way"	Barbara Dane	Producer
1960	Songs of Our Heritage	Duane Eddy	Producer
1960	$1,000,000.00 Worth of Twang	Duane Eddy	Co-composer
1962	Cruisin' for Surf Bunnies	The Woodchucks	Producer, composer
1963	Twangy Guitar – Silky Strings	Duane Eddy	Producer, composer
1963	Surfin' Hootenanny	Al Casey	Producer, composer
1963	Surfin'	Duane Eddy	Producer, co-composer
1963	Deuces, "T's," Roadsters & Drums'	Hal Blaine	Producer, composer
1963	Dance with the Guitar Man'	Duane Eddy	Producer, composer
1966	Boots	Nancy Sinatra	Producer, composer
1966	The Shacklefords Sings	The Shacklefords	Producer, composer
1966	How Does That Grab You?	Nancy Sinatra	Producer, composer
1967	"This Town"	Frank Sinatra	Writer
1967	Country, My Way	Nancy Sinatra	Producer, composer
1967	Sugar	Nancy Sinatra	Producer, composer
1967	Movin' with Nancy	Nancy Sinatra	Producer, composer
1968	Dreams and Images	Arthur Lee Harper	Co-producer
1995	Sidewinder	Al Casey	Guest vocalist and composer
