= The Kitchen Cinq =

American garage rock band

Background information
- Origin: Amarillo, Texas, United States
- Genres: Garage rock; folk rock; psychedelic
- Years active: 1962-1968
- Labels: LHI, Decca
- Past members: James 'Jim' Ervan Parker; Mark Gordon Creamer; Troy Dale Gardner; James Dallas Smith; Johnny Joe Stark

The Kitchen Cinq were an American garage rock band from Amarillo, Texas active in the 1960s, whose lineup included guitarist and songwriter Jim Parker. They evolved out of the Illusions and eventually changed their name to the Y'alls, releasing records under both names, and enjoyed regional success before moving to Los Angeles, where they signed with Lee Hazlewood's LHI label and became the Kitchen Cinq. As the Kitchen Cinq they recorded five singles between 1966 and 1968, as well as the album Everything but the Kitchen Cinq, released in 1967. In December 1967, they released a single under the alias a Handful, but returned to their better-known moniker for their final release in 1968.

== History ==
The Kitchen Cinq originally evolved out of the Illusions in Amarillo, Texas. Between 1961 and 1962, guitarist Mark Gordon Creamer of the Illusions invited Jim Parker to join the group who, at that time had two other members, including bassist Dale Gardner. Parker was friends with Jimmie Gilmer, who with his band the Fireballs had a hit with "Sugar Shack". The group's sound was heavily influenced by the British Invasion bands from England, particularly the Dave Clark Five. The Illusions released a single on Dot Records that featured an A-side "Brenda (Don’t Put Me Down)" written by Jim Parker backed with "Secrets of Love" co-written by Parker and band Gardner. It was recorded in Odessa, Texas at a studio owned by Tommy Allsup, who had played on the same bills as stars such as Buddy Holly & the Crickets and Ritchie Valens in the 1950s. The Illusions' single became a regional hit. According to Parker, "I was the elder statesman in the group – I was 19, 20-ish then ...and we played around town, and JD Souther’s group, The Cinders, was in competition with us. We were buddies, but we got most of the great gigs because we had a full band and Mark played organ, harmonica and guitar, and we had five-part harmonies...."

The Illusions eventually changed their name to the Y’alls and released the single, featuring the fuzz-drenched "Please Come Back" backed with Lennon & McCartney's "Run for Your Life (Beatles song)" on the Ruff label, which was released in May 1966. Later that year, they relocated to Los Angeles and changed their name to Kitchen Cinq. The group was co-managed by Tom Thacker, who made a connection with Lee Hazlewood, and Red Steagall. The group was signed to Hazlewood's LHI label. Their first release for LHI was the single, "Determination" b/w "You'll Be Sorry Someday", which came out in November 1966. It was followed by "(Ellen Francis) Ride in the Wind" b/w "If You Think..." in February 1967, "Still in Love With You Baby" b/w "(Ellen Francis) Ride in the Wind" in April. The group regularly played at the Cheetah, a large ballroom located in Santa Monica, and on several occasions appeared on the same bill as the Young Rascals. They shared the bill on occasions with Eddie Floyd, usually at small "parking lot" gigs. According to Parker, "We had regional success with the Kitchen Cinq, too. We traveled around and got to do TV shows with James Brown and all kinds of cool people." The group made appearances outside of California as far away as Florida, New York, and Connecticut. The group had only a regional fan base though, and in an effort to gain a new start for a national base their name was changed for a cameo release.

In 1967 the Kitchen Cinq went to L.A.'s Gold Star Studios where Buffalo Springfield were also working at the time, and recorded the album Everything But the Kitchen Cinq which came out in the middle of the year and was produced by Lee Hazlewood’s then-girlfriend, Suzi Jane Hokom, who also produced an album by International Submarine Band. On Everything but the Kitchen Cinq, session musicians from the Wrecking Crew, including Glen Campbell, Larry Knechtel, Carol Kaye, and Hal Blaine appeared on some of the tracks. The LP showcased the band's deft harmonies and included renditions of Neil Diamond's "Solitary Man", and Buffy Sainte-Marie's "Cod'ine". Photographs on the back of the LP jacket displayed the band posing alongside TV stars Bill Cosby and Dick Van Dyke. In July 1967 the group issued the single, "When the Rainbow Disappears" b/w "The Street Song" in July—their last release for LHI. In late 1967, they released a single, "Does Anybody Know" b/w "Dying Daffodil Incident" credited as A Handful. They subsequently signed with Decca Records and in February 1968 released their last single "Good Lovin' (So Hard to Find)" b/w "For Never When We Meet".

Out of the remnants of the Kitchen Cinq, some of its members evolved into Armageddon, a moderately successful progressive rock outfit, issueing just one self-titled album on Amos Records. Jim Parker went on to become a member of one of the post-Van Morrison lineups of Them. In the 1970s, he played in the rock group Baby, who opened for popular stadium rock acts as REO Speedwagon, Aerosmith, Black Oak Arkansas, and Exile. In the mid-1970s, he moved to Nashville and worked at a grocery store with future country star, John Anderson. Together, they co-wrote several songs, including "I’ve Got a Feeling (Somebody’s Been Stealin’)", and through this association, Parker drifted into country music. In the early 1980s, he recorded and toured with popular country outfit Dave & Sugar, and has since, become an established professional songwriter in Nashville. In addition to his musical career, he has also worked as a licensed relator since 1979.

The Kitchen Cinq's work has come to the attention of garage rock enthusiasts with reissues of Everything but the Kitchen Cinq and the release of When the Rainbow Disappears" an Anthology 1965-68, which features the group's complete recorded work, compiled by Alec Palao, who personally sought out the members of the band in researching the project.

== Membership ==
- Jim Parker (guitar and vocals)
- Mark Creamer (guitar and vocals)
- Dale Gardner (bass and vocals)
- Dallas Smith (guitar)
- Johnny Stark (drums)

== Discography ==
=== Singles ===
==== As the Illusions ====
- "Brenda (Don’t Put Me Down)" b/w "Secrets of Love" (Dot)

==== As the Y'alls ====
- "Please Come Back" b/w "Run for Your Life" (Ruff 1016, May 1966)

==== As the Kitchen Cinq ====
- "Determination" b/w "You'll Be Sorry Someday" (LHI 17000, November 1966)
- "(Ellen Francis) Ride in the Wind" b/w "If You Think..." (LHI 17005, February 1967)
- "Still in Love With You Baby" b/w "(Ellen Francis) Ride in the Wind" (LHI 17010, April 1967)
- "When the Rainbow Disappears" b/w "The Street Song" (LHI 17015, July 1967)
- "Good Lovin' (So Hard to Find)" b/w "For Never When We Meet" (Decca 32262, February 1968)

==== As a Handful ====
- "Does Anybody Know?" b/w "Dying Daffodil Incident" (LHI 1201, December 1967)

=== LP ===
- Everything but the Kitchen Cinq (LHI, 1967)

== Bibliography ==
- Markesich, Mike (2012). Teenbeat Mayhem (1st ed.). Branford, Connecticut: Priceless Info Press. ISBN 978-0-985-64825-1.
