= Earl Poole Ball =

American singer-songwriter

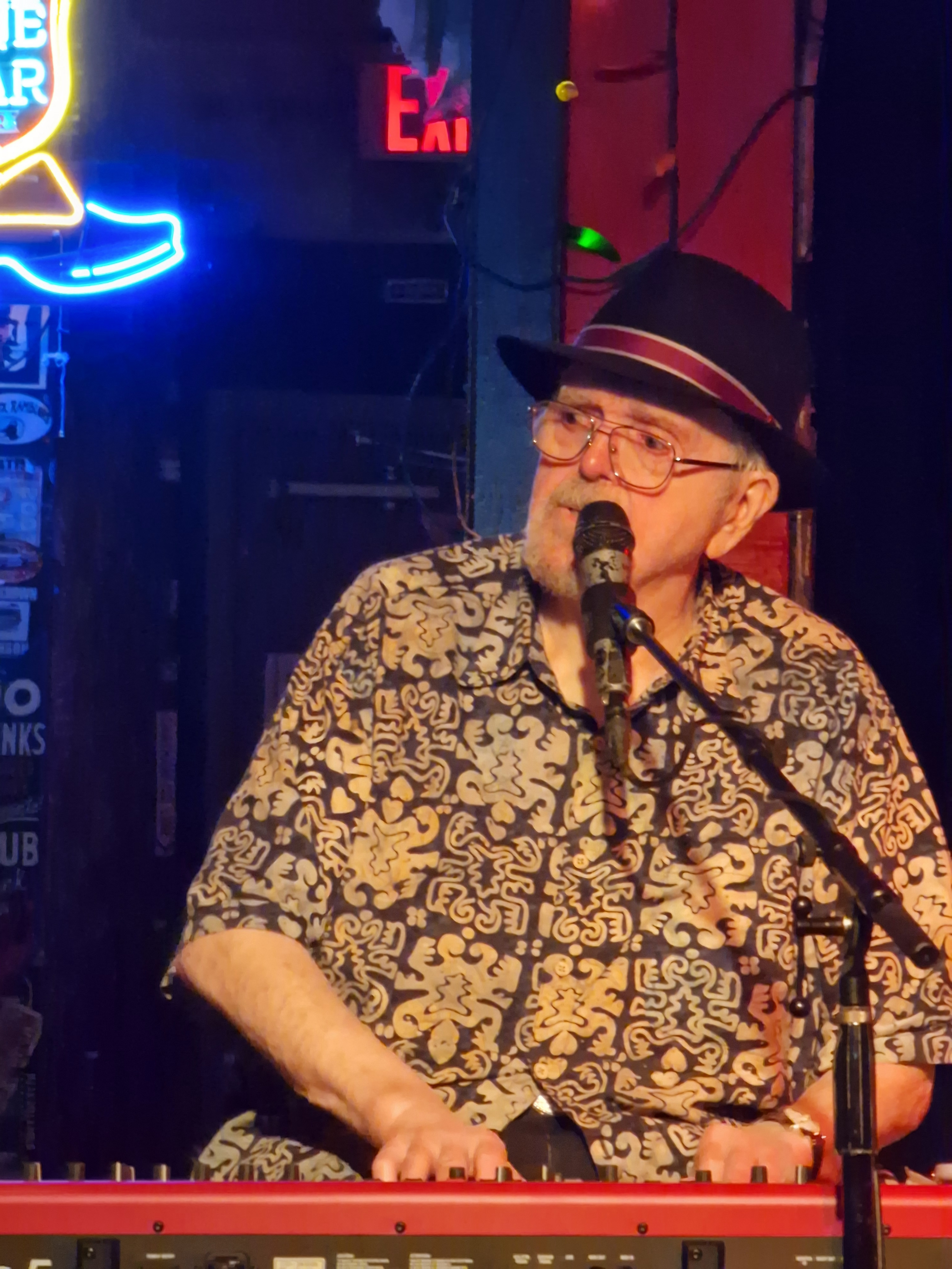
- Earl Poole Ball performing keyboard and vocals live at The Continental Club in April 2024

Background information
- Born: Earl Poole Ball Jr. March 12, 1941 (age 85); Hattiesburg, MS, U.S.
- Genre: Country Rockabilly
- Occupations: Keyboardist, Singer, Actor
- Years active: 1957–present
- Website: earlpooleball.com

Earl Poole Ball Jr. (born March 12, 1941) is an American singer-songwriter, pianist, music producer and actor. His musical work spans the Ameripolitan, Country, Americana and Rockabilly genres. He has performed with many well known American musicians, including Buck Owens & The Buckaroos, Gram Parsons, Carl Perkins, Merle Haggard, Freddie Hart, Marty Stuart, Phil Ochs, Michael Nesmith, Marty Robbins, Wynn Stewart, The Flying Burrito Brothers and The Byrds. He is best known for his 20 years spent touring and recording with Johnny Cash. (1977-1997)

== Early years ==
Ball was born in Columbia, Mississippi. An only child, he was raised in Foxworth, Mississippi by his parents and grandparents. His father ran a pool hall. "Earl Poole Ball" sounds like a stage name, but it is his given name; "Poole" is his grandmother's maiden name.

When Ball Jr was eight years old, he began taking piano lessons from his aunt Kathryn Ball, the minister of music at The Foxworth First Baptist Church. He learned classical music and hymns, and later chords and music theory, and played the popular music from radio programs. Ball and some friends formed a band called The Hill Cats, and played at local venues. Ball also worked as a bus boy in a diner.

== Career ==
=== Early career ===
At the age of 16, Earl was hired to play piano on The Jimmy Swan Television Show in Hattiesburg. After graduating from High School, Ball moved to Hattiesburg and continued playing music on the show and in local night clubs. He supplemented his income by selling Fuller Brushes door-to-door. Ball was introduced to blues by Dr. John.

In 1959 Ball was hired to play piano as part of the re-election campaign for Louisiana Governor Jimmie Davis.

Ball enrolled in college in Hattiesburg for three months but spent most of his time playing in honky-tonks. His young marriage broke up, and Ball moved to Houston, where he spent the next three years playing in honky-tonks at night and selling sewing machines by day. His old band from Hattiesburg relocated to Houston and Earl had a regular gig with them at The Silver Dollar Lounge. He learned some practical skills from country piano player and singer Mickey Gilley.

After three years in Houston, Earl headed to Los Angeles. He was hired as a piano player in a Country Music TV series which eventually became a movie called “Country A-G0-G0”. There he met drummer Jon Corneal, who Earl would later work with on the Gram Parsons recording sessions.

Back in L.A., Ball performed as part of the house band at The Aces Club and played every Sunday afternoon on the TV show Cal's Corral. He then was hired for the house band at The Palomino Club. He was so busy that he turned down an offer from Elvis Presley's guitarist James Burton to join Presley's stage band. Ball also played on a number of sessions with Buck Owens' Buckaroos.

Ball wrote and did session work for Stone's Central Songs. His songs were recorded, and reached the top of Billboard's chart, by Glen Campbell (“Try A Little Kindness”) and Waylon Jennings (“The Only Daddy That'll Walk The Line”). Earl then began working at Capitol Records, starting as a sessions player and associate producer under Ken Nelson, who was vice-president of Capitol's Country Music Division. Ball worked with many artists on Nelson's roster including Buck Owens, Merle Haggard, Wynn Stewart, Stoney Edwards, Susan Raye, Wanda Jackson, Bonnie Owens, Freddie Hart and folk/protest singer Phil Ochs.

Earl played on the original recording of 'Don't Bogart Me'. By The Fraternity of Man, which was in the 1969 film “Easy Rider”. Ball recorded with Gram Parsons and The International Submarine Band on the album “Safe at Home”, and again when Parsons was with The Byrds, on the album “Sweetheart of the Rodeo”.

=== Nashville ===
In 1971 Ball was transferred to Nashville, where he continued to produce and do session work for Capitol Records. He produced Freddie Hart's album “My Hang-Up Is You”, which included two #1 singles on the Country Music Chart. Ball also performed in the Nashville club scene and in studio sessions for Atlantic records. His friend Harlan Howard introduced him to Johnny Cash. He recorded with Cash in 1973 on a record that Don Davis was producing, and again in 1977, at which time he was hired to tour with Cash. He produced Cash's 1980 album “Rockabilly Blues”. Ball stayed with the band for 20 years, touring and performing on Cash's TV specials until Cash's retirement in 1997.

Ball played piano on two songs on the 1985 album Lost & Found by Nashville-based cowpunk band Jason & the Scorchers: "Broken Whiskey Glass" and "Far Behind". In 1999, he recalled that while he was working on the latter tune, James Burton dropped by the studio to show Scorchers guitarist Warner E. Hodges some licks.

=== Film career ===
Director Peter Bogdanovich included the song I Don't Think I Could Take You Back Again, which was written by Earl Poole Ball and Jo-El Sonnier, in his 1981 film They All Laughed. Ball was hired to play piano in the film, and began to take acting lessons. He also appeared in a 1981 TV movie with Cash and Brenda Vaccaro called The Pride of Jesse Hallam. In 1983, he and Cash worked together on another made-for-TV film Murder in Coweta County with actor Andy Griffith.

In 1986 Earl moved back to California and found more work in character roles on movies such as Texasville (1990) and The Thing Called Love (1993).

=== Austin, Texas ===
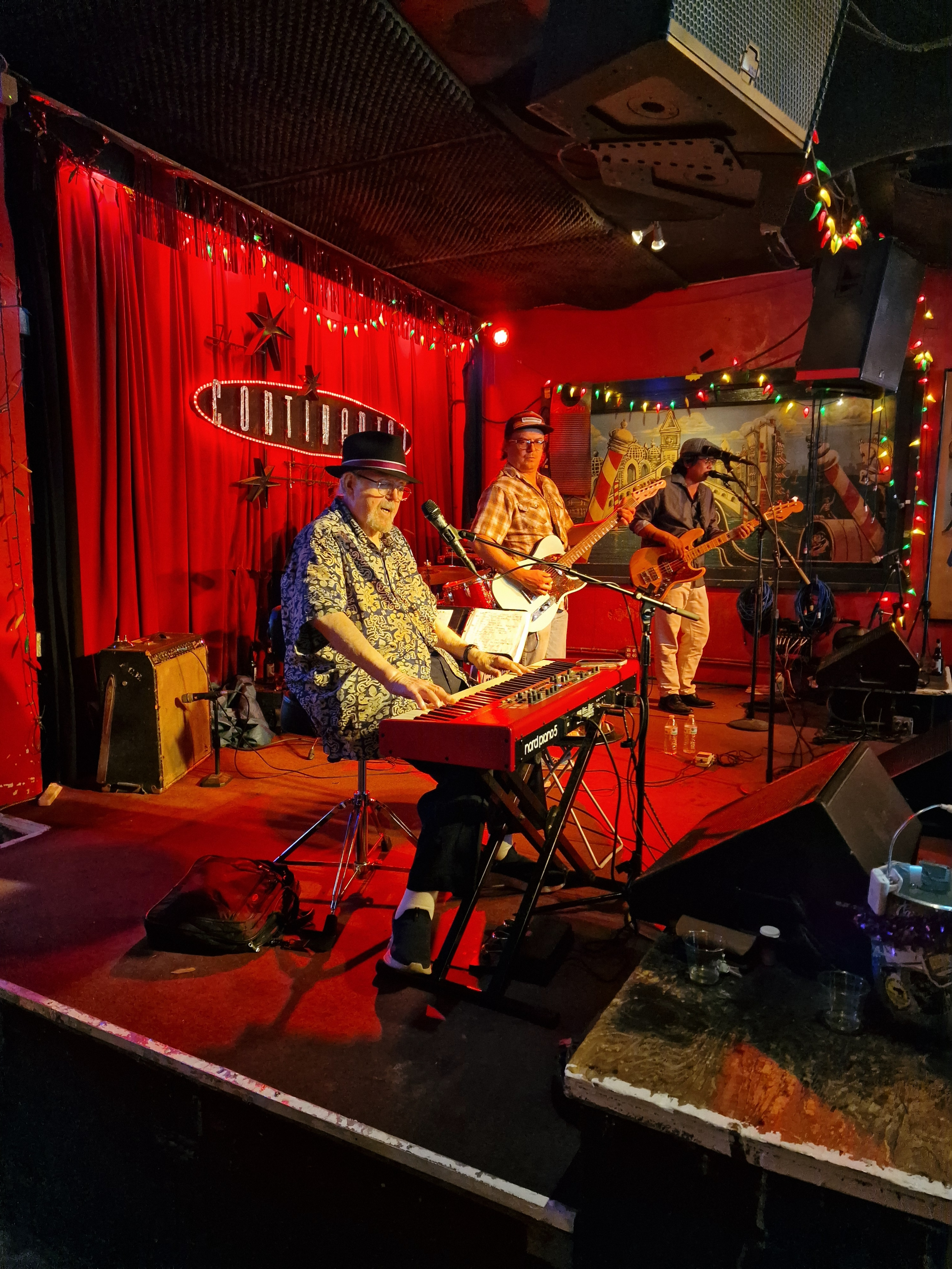
Earl Poole Ball & Friends performing a weekly Saturday afternoon residency at the Continental Club

In 1999 Ball moved to Austin, Texas. He continues to write songs, perform and do session work. He performs live with several bands including Heybale!, Earl Poole Ball's Rockabilly Blues Band, Earl Poole Ball and The Cosmic Americans, and Earl Poole Ball & Friends, with whom he performs a weekly residency at The Continental Club in Austin.

== Discography ==
=== As performer ===
- The International Submarine Band - Safe At Home - LHI Records, 1968
- The Byrds - Sweetheart Of The Rodeo - Columbia Records, 1968
- Wanda Jackson - In Person Live at “Mr Lucky's” in Phoenix, Arizona - Capitol Records, 1969
- Michael Nesmith & the First National Band – The Magnetic South - RCA Victor, 1970
- The Flying Burrito Brothers – White Line Fever - A&M Records, 1971
- David Rogers - Farewell To the Ryman - Atlantic Records, 1973
- Jo-El Sonnier – Cajun Life – Rounder Select, 1975
- Johnny Cash - Gone Girl – Columbia Records, 1978
- Johnny Cash – Silver - CBS, 1979
- Gram Parsons – Gram Parsons - Shiloh Records, 1979
- Johnny Cash – Rockabilly Blues – Columbia, 1980
- Johnny Cash – Koncert V Praze (In Prague Live) – Supraphon, CBS, 1983
- Johnny Cash – Believe in Him – A&M Records, 1985
- Johnny Cash – Classic Cash – Mercury Records, 1988
- Mosley Grape – Live at Indigo Ranch – San Francisco Sound, 1989
- Johnny Cash – Boom Chicka Boom – Mercury, 1990
- Earl Poole Ball - Best Loved and Most Requested - 2011
- Johnny Cash – The Essential Johnny Cash 1955-1983 – Columbia, Legacy Records, 1992
- Buck Owens – The Very Best of Buck Owens, Vol 1– Rhino Records, 1994
- Buck Owens – The Very Best of Buck Owens, Vol 2 – Rhino Records, 1994
- Michael Nesmith & The First National Band – Magnetic South & Loose Salute – Camden Deluxe, 1999
- Flying Burrito Brothers – Hot Burritos! Anthology 1969-1972 – A&M Records, 2000
- Susanna Van Tassel – Heart I Wear – Susanna Van Tassel, 2000
- Sleepy LaBeef – Rockabilly Blues – Bullseye Blues, 2001
- The Byrds – Sanctuary IV – Columbia, Sundazed Music, Sony, 2002
- James McMurtry – Saint Mary of the Woods – Sugar Hill Records, 2002
- Johnny Cash – Johnny Cash is Coming To Town – Mercury, 2003
- Carrie Rodriguez & Chip Taylor – Trouble With Humans – 2003
- Carolyn Wonderland – Alcohol and Salvation – Mix-O-Rama, 2003
- South Filthy – Crackin' Up – Rockin' Bones, 2005
- Lucky Tomblin Band – In a Honky-Tonk Mood – Texas World, 2006
- The Mother Truckers – Broke, Not Broken – Funzalo, 2006
- Johnny Cash – Nashville Sessions Vol. 1 – Mercury, 2007
- Johnny Cash – Nashville Sessions Vol. 2 – Mercury, 2007
- Johnny Cash – The Great Lost Performance – Mercury, 2007
- Merle Haggard – The Studio Recordings, 1969-1976 - Bear Family (Germany), 2007
- Jack Grace Band - Drinking Song For Lovers - Radia, 2008
- Eugene Chadbourne – Chadbourne Volunteer Fire Department and Rescue Squad – Rossbin, 2008
- Heybale! - Last Country Album – Shuffle 5, 2008
- South Filthy – Undertakin' Daddy – Beast Records, Trashmondain, 2009
- Walter Daniels – How to Become a Devil With... - Ghost Highway Recordings, 2001
- Stonehoney – The Cedar Creek Recordings – 2010
- Lucky Tomblin Band – Red Hot From Blue Rock – Texas World, 2007
- Lucky Tomblin Band – Honky-Tonk Merry Go Round – Texas World, 2010
- Heybale! - Heybale - 2011
- Erik & Sanne – De Fantastische Expeditie – ENS, 2012
- Gram Parsons & The International Submarine Band – The Devil and The Deep Blue Sea – Ze Anonym Plattenspieler
- Don't Bogart Me – Various Then and Now Vol 2 – San Francisco Sound
- Bikini Baby – Various Then and Now Vol 2 – San Francisco Sound
- Earl Poole Ball - Pianography - 2013
- David Kraai - Back To When - 2026

=== As writer/arranger ===
- I'd give a Whole Lot of Me for a Little Bit of You – Various:blue Ribbon Country Vol 1 – Capitol, 1969
- Phil Ochs – Greatest Hits – A&M Records, 1970
- Wynn Stewart – Heavenly/You're No Secret of Mine – Capitol, 1970
- Terry Stafford – Say, Has Anybody Seen My Sweet Gypsy Rose – Atlantic, 1974
- Linda Ronstadt – Hand Sown...Home Grown – Capitol Records, 2004
- Ray Stanley – Yolanda/ I've Wasted My Love – Chaparral
- Vern Stovall and The Showmen – The Wreck of the Olds 88/ Break Time – Longhorn Records
- Bobby George – I Wish I Was Coming Home(To You)/ Heart of The City – Pompeii Records

=== As producer ===
- Wynn Stewart – It's a Beautiful Day – Capitol, 1970
- Bobby Austin – When Your Sweet Love Carried On – Capitol, 1970
- Wynn Stewart – Heavenly/ You're No Secret of Mine – Capitol, 1970
- Beth Moore – Put Your Hand in The Hand – Capitol, 1971
- Wynn Stewart – Baby, It's Yours/ I Was the First One to Know – Capitol, 1971
- Stoney Edwards – Mama's Love/ Poor Folks Stick Together – Capitol, 1971
- Wynn Stewart – Baby, It's Yours – Capitol, 1971
- Freddie Hart – My Hang-Up is You/ Big Bad Wolf – Capitol, 1972
- Marty Mitchell - Midnight Man - Atlantic, 1974
- Terry Stafford - Stop If You Love Me – Atlantic, 1974
- Terry Stafford – Say, Has Anybody Seen My Sweet Gypsy Rose – Atlantic, 1974
- Terry Stafford – Captured – Atlantic, 1974
- Johnny Cash – Rockabilly Blues – Columbia, 1980
- Johhny Cash – Song of the Patriot – Columbia, 1980
- Johnny Cash – The Essential Johnny Cash 1955-1983 (producer of 2 cuts) – Columbia, Legacy, 1992
- Merle Haggard – The Studio Recordings, 1969-1976 - Bear Family (Germany), 2007

== Film ==
- The Thing Called Love (1993)
- They All Laughed (1981)
- Texasville(1990)

== Television ==
- Jimmy Swan Television Show (1956 - 1957)
- Country A Go-Go (1964)
- Cal's Corral (1964-1965)
- The Pride of Jesse Hallam (1981)
- Murder in Coweta County (1983)
- The Baron and the Kid (1984)
- Naked City: A Killer Christmas (1998)
