= Donnie Owens =

American musician (1932–1994)

Donnie Owens (aka Donald Lee Owens) (October 30, 1932 – October 27, 1994) was an American singer, guitarist, producer, and composer. His hit song “Need You” peaked at #25 on the Billboard Hot 100 chart in 1958. Owens worked extensively with artist/songwriter/producer Lee Hazlewood and worked as an executive producer for LHI Records. He was a session musician and played the rhythm guitar for Duane Eddy, Nancy Sinatra, Elvis Presley and many others. In 1994, Owens was accidentally shot to death by his girlfriend.

== Early life ==
Owens was born on October 30, 1932, in Chester, Pennsylvania to parents John Easley Owens and Nellie Mae Brigman Owens. After high school he joined the United States Air Force and became an Airman First Class. He served in the Korean War.

When fellow Korean War veteran Lee Hazlewood moved to Arizona, Owens helped him get a job as a disc jockey at KCKY, a small country station in Coolidge, Arizona. This was the beginning of a working relationship which spanned decades.

== Singer/songwriter ==
Owens recorded several singles on the Guyden Records label (a subsidiary of the Philadelphia-based Jamie Records label), each featuring Duane Eddy on guitar.

His first release was in 1958 when he recorded songwriter Buddy Wheeler's song “Need You” at Loy Clingman's Viv Recording Studio in Phoenix, Arizona. “Need You” peaked at #25 on the Billboard Hot 100 charts and stayed on the charts for 15 weeks In 2012, “Need You” was named by the Phoenix New Times as one of the 100 songs which define Arizona.

His second release, “Tomorrow” was also written by Buddy Wheeler. The back-up vocals were provided by the Ben Denton Singers. “Tomorrow” charted in the Top 30 in Phoenix and was play listed in Chicago and Boston. It reached #89 on the Cashbox Top 100 Singles chart, but never charted in Billboard.

In 1958, Owens and the Ben Denton singers released the EP Out of My Heart in Sweden on the London Records label. This album included Owens’ songs “Need You” and “Tomorrow” as well as “Out of My Heart” and “If I’m Wrong.”

His third Guyden song “Ask Me Anything,” was released in May 1959. It made the Top 30 in Phoenix, Arizona, but failed to chart nationally.

To promote his albums, Owens made appearance on numerous radio and TV shows. On November 2, 1958, Owens was featured on the Len Graham Record Hop and on January 14, 1959, he performed on Dick Clark’s American Bandstand.

Owens also had releases on other record labels. In 1961 he recorded the single “Stormy (Came to Town)” (written by Lee Hazlewood) with B-side “What A Dream!” for Trey Records. The single was released in the US and Canada. “Stormy (Came To Town)” received airplay in Vancouver and peaked at #7. Vancouver was the only record market where the song charted. The same year Owens also released the promo single “No Love Lost”/’I Forgot About You” on Project Records. Both songs were written by Norma and Connie Conway and produced by Lee Hazlewood.

In 1966, Owens wrote and released the single “Heart Attack” with B-side “Loneliness of Hurt” (written by Jimmy Gray) on the Ramco label. Owens and Floyd Ramsey produced both sides. The same year, he released the single “My World” (written by Owens and Waylon Jennings) with B-side “Soldier’s Last Letter” (written by Ernest Tubb and Sgt. Henry Stewart) on the ARA label. Both sides were produced by Owens and Waylon Jennings.

In 1967, he wrote and recorded the single, “Climbin’ the Walls,” which was the A-side to his cover of the song "These Boots Are Made for Walkin’” which was written by Lee Hazlewood and previously recorded by Nancy Sinatra. Owens and Waylon Jennings produced both sides.

Donnie Owens wrote songs for a number of other recording artists, including Budd the Spudd and the Sprouts, Virgil Warner, Johnny Wakely, Ray Sharpe, Sanford Clark and Mac Wiseman.

== Guitarist ==
Owens played the rhythm guitar and was a Rebel in Duane Eddy`s band, Duane Eddy & The Rebels. He recorded with Eddy on his albums Have 'Twangy' Guitar Will Travel (Jamie Records, 1958), The “Twangs” The “Thang” (Jamie Records, 1959), Duane Eddy With Guests Donnie Owens and Neil Sedaka ( Reo Records, 1959), and Duane A Go Go Go (Colpix Records, 1965). Many of these recordings were later included in compilation albums produced by Rhino Records, Bear Family Records, Hoodoo Records, EMI Records, Sundazed Music, Fervor Records, Light in the Attic Records, and others. In 2001, Duane Eddy, Donnie Owens, and Sanford Clark were featured in a compilation album called The Twang Gang released by Jamie Records (CAT#4017).

In 1966, he played guitar for Nancy Sinatra’s album, Sugar (Reprise Records) and his work was included in the 1986 compilation album Nancy Sinatra Featuring Lee Hazlewood and Frank Sinatra (Rhino Records). Owens also performed with Nancy Sinatra at the Riviera Hotel in Las Vegas.

Owens played guitar on several Lee Hazlewood albums, including The N.S.V.I.P.'s (Not...So...Very...Important...People) (Reprise Records, 1965), Love and Other Crimes (Reprise Records, 1968), Requiem for an Almost Lady (Viking, 1971), and his Cowboy in Sweden soundtrack (LHI Records, 1970).

In 1968 Owens was a guitarist on the Elvis Presley RCA Records release “Speedway,” the original motion picture soundtrack for the MGM motion picture of the same name.

He performed for almost five years as Donnie Owens and the 4 Jacks at Harry’s Capri Lounge in Phoenix, Arizona.

== Producer ==
In 1966, Owens was hired as executive producer of the Country & Western music division of LHI Records and produced albums for artists such as Barney Carl, Virgil Warner, Linda Owens, Honey Ltd., Suzi Jane Hokom, Buddy Long, Sanford Clark, Lee Hazlewood, Ann-Margret, Danny Michaels, Jimmie Lee Morris, and Joe Cannon. He also worked as a producer for other record labels such as Ramco, Bell Records, ARA Records.

In 1970, Owens worked as a producer for Lee Hazlewood’s documentary A Cowboy in Sweden and was an associate producer for its soundtrack.

== Death ==
On October 27, 1994, Owens was accidentally killed at the Palms Motel in Phoenix, Arizona. His girlfriend, the manager of the hotel, was trying to scare off a man who was threatening Owens, but instead, accidentally shot Owens in the stomach. He was taken to the hospital where he died of his injuries. He was interred at National Memorial Cemetery of Arizona in Phoenix.

== TV song placements ==
His song "Climbin' the Walls" is played on the Showtime series, Shameless (season 7, episode 4). His song "Heart Attack" is played on the USA Network's show Colony (season 3, episode 7) and ABC's The Astronaut Wives Club (season 1, episode 6). His song "Useless" is played on the Epix series Graves (season 1, episode 7).
