= James Ervan Parker =

Musical artist (born 1942)

Jim Parker
- Jim Parker Performing at the Silver Moon Stage of the FloraBama

Background information
- Born: James Ervan Parker; December 21, 1942 (age 83)
- Origin: La Habra, California, United States
- Genres: Country
- Occupation: Singer-songwriter
- Instruments: Vocals acoustic guitar
- Years active: 1961–present
- Labels: Dot Records, LHI Records, Amos Records, Happy Tiger Records
- Website: http://www.jimparkermusic.com

James Ervan "Jim" Parker (born December 21, 1942, in La Habra, California) is an American singer-songwriter and co-founder of the Huntsville, Alabama sub-chapter of the Nashville Songwriters Association International. Parker lives in Madison, Alabama, his home since 1985.

== Early career ==
Parker received his first guitar from Jimmy Gilmer of The Fireballs in 1961. At the time Gilmer was dating Parker's sister.

=== The Illusions ===
In 1961 Jim Parker joined a music group that called themselves The Illusions:

- Mark Gordon Creamer – vocals, guitar, keyboards, and harmonica
- James Ervan Parker – vocals and guitar
- Johnny Joe Stark – vocals and drums
- James Dallas Smith (deceased) – vocals and bass
- Troy Dale Gardner (deceased) – vocals

The group recorded a single with Dot Records which was produced by Tommy Allsup (Buddy Holly's lead guitar player) in Odessa, Texas. Parker wrote the A-side, "Brenda (Don't Put Me Down)," and co-wrote the B-side, "(Secrets Of Love)". "Tommy had a very nice studio and was a real pro when it came to handling young musicians. Mark Creamer's Dad, Gordon, played some really cool flute on it."

=== The Kitchen Cinq ===
The group continued to record in Amarillo under the Ruff label, produced by Ray Ruff. The group changed their name to the Y'alls in 1964 and recorded a second single in 1966. In 1965 the group had moved to Los Angeles where they later changed their name to the Kitchen Cinq and worked under Lee Hazlewood's LHI Records label. They released their first album, Everything But... by the Kitchen Cinq.

The group had only a regional fan base, and in an effort to gain a new start for a national base their name was changed two more times. A single, "Dying Daffodil Incident" b/w "Does Anybody Know" (LHI 45–1201, 1967), was released under the name A Handful. The group changed bass players and changed their name one more time to Armageddon and recorded one more album and then disbanded.

An anthology on Light in the Attic Records, When The Rainbow Disappears, was released August 28, 2015, including a box set of most of the early recordings. Excluded was "Don't Put Me Down" penned by Jim Parker and "Secrets of Love" by Jim Parker and Dale Gardener. It was the group's first major-label deal when they were the Illusions signed to Dot Records. Also excluded were The Kitchen Cinq's "Minstrel Song" and the cover of "She's So Fine" on the Decca label.

=== Them ===
Parker and Johnny Stark joined the last original member of the group Them—bass player Alan Henderson—for the final lineup of the band that originally had included Van Morrison. A single album, Them – In Reality, was produced in 1971 and included five tracks cowritten by Parker and Stark.

=== Transition to country music ===
Parker transitioned to country music in the mid-1970s and began to focus on song writing. He still performed and toured with Dave & Sugar from 1980 to 1981.

== Songwriting ==
Parker co-wrote John Anderson's first single, "I've Got a Feelin' (Somebody's Been Stealin')" (co-written with John Anderson and Michael Garvin), in 1978. The song received an ASCAP country song award. In the late 1970s Parker co-wrote "Chicken Truck", which was recorded by John Anderson in 1981 as the last song in a recording session. The song became a B-side release for the song "I Love You A Thousand Ways" by Lefty Frizzell, but Jerry House, a popular DJ in Nashville, turned the single over and played the B-side, and the song took off.

Parker co-wrote the title track of John Anderson's twelfth studio album, Bigger Hands, which was released in 2009 and peaked at number 53 on the Billboard Country Albums Chart. The song was released as the second single from the album but did not chart.

=== Songwriters Series ===
Parker is the creator and host of a show at the Von Braun Center Playhouse in Huntsville, Alabama, called Jim Parker's Songwriters Series where he showcases the talent of songwriters from Los Angeles; Canada; Georgia; Nashville, Tennessee; Muscle Shoals, Alabama; and surrounding areas. This monthly event with a dinner-theater atmosphere lets people listen to songs and the stories behind them from the people who wrote them.
