= Some Velvet Morning =

1967 song by Lee Hazlewood

- West German picture sleeve

Single by Nancy Sinatra & Lee Hazlewood

from the album Movin' With Nancy
- B-side: "Oh, Lonesome Me"
- Released: December 1967
- Recorded: Late 1967
- Studio: Capitol, Los Angeles
- Genre: Psychedelic rock; country
- Length: 3:39
- Label: Reprise
- Songwriter: Lee Hazlewood
- Producer: Lee Hazlewood

Nancy Sinatra singles chronology
"Tony Rome" (1967)	"Some Velvet Morning" (1967)	"Things" (1968)

Audio sample
- "Some Velvet Morning": file; help

"Some Velvet Morning" is a song written by Lee Hazlewood and originally recorded by Hazlewood and Nancy Sinatra in late 1967. It first appeared on Sinatra's album Movin' with Nancy, the soundtrack to her 1967 television special of the same name, which also featured a performance of the song. It was subsequently released as a single before appearing on the 1968 album Nancy & Lee.

== Composition ==
The male part of the song is in 4/4 time signature whereas the female part is in 3/4. Hazlewood's voice is recorded with more reverberation than is Sinatra's, making it sound bidimensional.

== The recording session ==
Sinatra's singing career received a boost in 1967 with the help of songwriter/producer/arranger Hazlewood, who had been making records for ten years, including with Duane Eddy. Hazlewood's collaboration with Sinatra began when her father Frank Sinatra asked Hazlewood to help boost his daughter's career.

In the fall of 1967, Nancy Sinatra joined Hazlewood at Capitol Studios in Los Angeles for a three-hour session. The recording was produced by Hazlewood and arranged by Billy Strange. According to one review, overdubbing was not used. Instead, the duo "recorded the entire song live with the band, the full orchestra and Lee Hazlewood and Nancy Sinatra singing all at the same time."

== Interpretation of the lyrics ==
Reviewers have offered a variety of interpretations of the song's lyrics. A British journalist said that "the puzzle of its lyrics and otherworldly beauty of its sound offering seemingly endless interpretations."

Hazlewood's explanation was less definitive than those of some others, saying: "It’s not meant to mean so much. I'm not a druggie, so it was never to do with that." He also confirmed that he was inspired by Greek mythology: "I thought they were a lot better than all those fairy tales that came from Germany that had killings and knifings. There was only about seven lines about Phaedra. She had a sad middle, a sad end, and by the time she was 17 she was gone. She was a sad-assed broad, the saddest of all Greek goddesses. So bless her heart, she deserves some notoriety, so I’ll put her in a song."

In 2003, London's The Daily Telegraph called the song "[O]ne of the strangest, druggiest, most darkly sexual songs ever written — ambitious, beautiful and unforgettable." As with many psychedelic songs, its overall meaning is somewhat obscure. The lyrics consist of the male part describing a mysterious, powerful woman named Phaedra, who "gave [him] life ... and ... made it end." The male part alternates with the female part, who identifies herself as Phaedra and speaks over ethereal, twinkling music about beautiful nature imagery and about the secrets held by an unknown collective "us”, the chorus lyrics saying “…flowers growing on a hill; dragonflies and daffodils … learn from us, very much; look at us, but do not touch. Phaedra is my name”.

The rhythm noticeably alternates between Hazlewood’s verses and Sinatra’s chorus lines, with the former all in 4/4 (common time) and Sinatra’s parts briefly changing to 3/4 (waltz time), and back again. The end of the song involves a “back-and-forth” between the two singers, highlighting the change in rhythm — every other line switches from 4/4 to 3/4, as Hazlewood and Sinatra each sing a line (in order) from their respective parts, in a pattern. For example:

Hazlewood (4/4): “Some velvet morning when I’m straight…”
Sinatra (3/4): “flowers growing on a hill…”
H: “I’m gonna open up your gate…”
S: “…dragonflies and daffodils…”

== Chart performance ==
Although "Some Velvet Morning" is among the more famous duets that Hazlewood and Sinatra recorded, it is considered a departure from their usual fare, as it is decidedly less influenced by country and western music. The single peaked at #26 on the Billboard Hot 100 in January 1968, and #36 in Canada.

== Legacy ==
- In November 2003, music critics for the British newspaper The Daily Telegraph placed the single at the #1 spot on their 50 Best Duets Ever list. According to Nathan Rabin: "These two weirdly complementary sides of Hazlewood's persona unite on 'Some Velvet Morning,' a standout track from Nancy & Lee. On that track, Hazlewood and Sinatra sound like they don’t inhabit the same universe, let alone the same song. Over loping spaghetti-Western guitar, Hazlewood sings of Greek mythology and 'some velvet morning when I’m straight,' while Sinatra coos about flowers and daffodils in a stoned haze against a backdrop of bubblegum psychedelia. 'Some Velvet Morning' sounds like two songs spliced together by a madman, or an avant-garde short film in song form."
- In August 2006, music critic Rob Mitchum placed the song at #49 spot on Pitchfork's list of the 200 greatest songs of the 1960s, saying "Even after thousands of listens, I still don’t know quite what to make of this bizarre, creepy song. A country-outlaw singer drowning in a pool of reverb, constantly interrupted by dazed-hippie interludes, and haunted by a storm cloud orchestra."
- In December 2015, Rolling Stone ranked the song at #9 in its 20 Greatest Duos of All Time retrospective.
- In 2017, Britain's Financial Times recalled the recording as "part rugged country, part fey folk, cloaked in psychedelia by Billy Strange’s haunting orchestration, will echo down the years." The article also mentioned that Hazlewood had recorded the song again shortly before his death: "On his 2005 swansong LP Cake or Death, he duets it with his grand-daughter ... Phaedra is her name."
- In 2026, The Guardian listed it as Nancy Sinatra's best song, putting it above These Boots Are Made for Walkin' at number 2 and Summer Wine at number 3. They described it as "beautiful but unsettling, fabulously arranged".

== Selective list of cover versions ==
The song has been covered many times, usually as a duet. Among other recordings:

- 1968: Gábor Szabó - guitar instrumental on Bacchanal
- 1969: Vanilla Fudge on Near the Beginning (#69 Canada, June 9, 1969)
- 1982: Lydia Lunch and Rowland S. Howard, 12" single later issued on Honeymoon in Red
- 1986: Peter Zaremba's Love Delegation on Spread the Word
- 1988: Rami Fortis and Berry Sakharof on Tales from the Box (performed with a Hebrew translation of the lyrics written by their Minimal Compact bandmate Samy Birnbach)
- 1990: Eedie and Eddie (Peter Langston) in Computing Systems (Volume 3, Number 2)
- 1993: Starpower - 12" single on Visionary Records
- 1993: Slowdive on the U.S. release of Souvlaki
- 1994: Lost & Profound on Memory Thief
- 1995: Thin White Rope on Spoor; the female vocal part is played on guitar
- 1996: Joe Christ and Pamela Puente on Hail Satan Dude: Music from My Goddamn Movies and More!!!
- 2001: My Dying Bride on Peaceville X and Meisterwerk 2
- 2002: Primal Scream and Kate Moss on Evil Heat; a different version was released as a single in 2003 and included on Primal Scream's compilation Dirty Hits
- 2002: The Webb Brothers featuring Laura Katter on the Lee Hazlewood tribute album Total Lee!
- 2002: Entombed on the compilation album Sons of Satan Praise the Lord
- 2004: Firewater on Songs We Should Have Written
- 2007: Lee Hazlewood and Phaedra Dawn Stewart (his granddaughter) on Cake or Death
- 2008: Polar and Loane on 68 Covers and a bonus track on French Songs (2009)
- 2009: Anny Celsi and Nelson Bragg on Tangle-Free World
- 2010: Inga Liljeström and Peter Fenton (Crow) on Sprawling Fawns and the EP Thistle (Groovescooter Records)
- 2013: Glenn Danzig and Cherie Currie, posted on danzig-verotik.com in 2013
- 2014: Alison Goldfrapp and John Grant at a Goldfrapp concert at the Royal Albert Hall
- 2024 Linda Dachtyl "Waves of Change" Summit Records/Chicken Coup Records http://www.dachtyl.com
