= Sprawling Fawns =

Studio album by Inga Liljeström
- Released: 2006
- Genre: Alternative rock; electronica; experimental; trip hop
- Length: 49:17
- Label: Groovescooter Records

Inga Liljeström chronology
Elk (2005)	Sprawling Fawns (2006)	Quiet Music for Quiet People (2006)

Sprawling Fawns is the third album by Inga Liljeström. It was released in 2006. It contains five new songs and six remixes of songs from Elk. "Some Velvet Morning" is a cover of a psychedelic pop song written by Lee Hazlewood and originally recorded by Hazlewood and Nancy Sinatra in late 1967.

== Track listing ==
1. "High Flying Birds" - 4:01
2. "You Shine" - 5:29
3. "Lira (Lake Lustre Remix)" - 4:36
4. "29 Poisons (Kevin Purdy Remix)" - 5:13
5. "Some Velvet Morning (with Peter Fenton)" - 5:15
6. "Wild Is the Wind" - 4:12
7. "Awkward Like a Boy" - 3:33
8. "All of This (Jacob Cook Remix)" - 3:58
9. "Stolen (Saddleback Remix)" - 3:09
10. "Deer (Ben Frost Remix)" - 3:04
11. "Lira (Pimmon Remix)" - 6:47
