= Lazy Day =

Lazy Day or Lazy Days may refer to:

== Film and TV ==
- Lazy Days (film), a 1929 film directed by Robert F. McGowan
- "Lazy Day", 1981 episode of The Sooty Show

== Music ==
=== Albums ===
- Lazy Days, album by Stuart Jones (composer) 2000
- Lazy Days, album by Ana Egge 2007

=== Songs ===
- "Lazy Day", a song by New York pop band The Left Banke from Walk Away Renée/Pretty Ballerina 1967
- "Lazy Day" (Spanky and Our Gang song), 1967
- "Lazy Day" (The Moody Blues song), 1969
- "Lazy Day", a song by The Boo Radleys from Everything's Alright Forever
- "Lazy Day", a song by Us3 from Hand on the Torch 1993
- "Lazy Days", a song from the album Life thru a Lens by Robbie Williams 1997
- "Lazy Days" (Gram Parsons song) 1967
- "Lazy Days", song by Chris Andrews (singer) 1972
- "Lazy Days", song by John Paul Young Love Is in the Air (studio album) 1978
- "Lazy Days", song by Leona Naess from Comatised 2000
- "Lazy Days", song by Enya from A Day Without Rain
- "Lazy Days", last single of Debbie (singer) 1988
- "Lazy Days", song by Toshiko Akiyoshi from Dig (Toshiko Akiyoshi album) 1993
- "Lazy Days", song by Tesla from Standing Room Only (Tesla album)
- "Lazy Days", song by Dean Brody from Dean Brody (album)
- "Lazy Days", song by Aaron Smith from Shwayze (album)
- "Lazy Days", song by Red Hot (band) and Adrian Lee
- "Lazy Days", song by Beulah (singer)
- "Lazy Days", song by Cheap Time
- "Lazy Days", song by Steve Wickham
