= The Cowboy and the Lady (album) =

Studio album by Lee Hazlewood and Ann-Margret
- Released: 1969
- Studio: RCA Studio A (Nashville, Tennessee)
- Genre: Country
- Label: LHI
- Producer: Lee Hazlewood

Lee Hazlewood chronology
Forty (1969)	The Cowboy and the Lady (1969)	Cowboy in Sweden (1970)

Ann-Margret chronology
Songs from The Swinger (And Other Swingin' Songs) (1966)	The Cowboy and the Lady (1969)	Ann-Margret (1980)

Professional ratings
Review scores
Source	Rating
AllMusic	2/5 stars

The Cowboy and the Lady is an album by Lee Hazlewood and Ann-Margret released by LHI Records in 1969. The album was one of the first projects Hazlewood developed after leaving ABC Records, severing his partnership with Nancy Sinatra and establishing his own label in 1968.

The first release from this collaboration was the single "Sleep in the Grass" which charted at #113 on Billboard magazine's Bubbling Under Hot 100 and #9 on Cash Box's Looking Ahead Chart. Although the single was not included in the first release of the album, it was added to several reissues on CD and vinyl.

The album was included in the 2013 Hazlewood boxset There’s a Dream I’ve Been Saving 1966-1971 and was also reissued in 2017 by Light in the Attic Records featuring bonus tracks not previously released.

== Critical reception ==
Cash Box praised the albums as a "powerhouse" and "very attractive ... with a strong commercial sound." The Los Angeles Times highlighted the track "You Turned My Head Around" as a "transfixing, should-be pop classic."Pitchfork called the collaboration "a spirited team-up ... that veers dangerously close to novelty." Allmusic stated in their review that "the best thing about this record is the photography," yet praised Hazlewood's arrangements as "brave, bold, and audacious." Exclaim! noted that "despite its tongue-in-cheek nature, the album contains a multitude of gems, including the wistful "Victims Of The Night", arguably the prettiest song ever written about one-night stands. Classic Rock magazine rated the album 7/10. Elsewhere retrospectively called the album "a convincing collection of country covers (and a few Lee originals)".

== Track listing ==
Side one
No.	Title	Writer(s)	Length
1.	"Am I That Easy to Forget"	Carl Belew, W.S. Stevenson	2:28
2.	"Only Mama That'll Walk The Line"	Jim Alley, Gene Alley	2:34
3.	"Greyhound Bus Depot"	Bobby George	3:40
4.	"Walk On Out Of My Mind"	Red Lane	2:47
5.	"Hangin' On"	Buddy Mize, Ira Allen	2:48
6.	"Victims Of The Night"	Charlie Williams, Joe Nixon	2:34

Side two
No.	Title	Writer(s)	Length
1.	"Break My Mind"	John D. Loudermilk	2:21
2.	"You Can't Imagine"	Ray Griff	2:11
3.	"Sweet Thing"	Nat Stuckey	3:30
4.	"No Regrets"	Tom Rush	2:24
5.	"The Dark End of the Street"	Dan Penn, Chips Moman	2:40

Bonus tracks (2017 reissue)
No.	Title	Writer(s)	Length
12.	"You Turned My Head Around"	Lee Hazlewood	2:33
13.	"It's a Nice World to Visit (But Not to Live In)"	Charlie Williams, Edith Kimbrough, Larry Collins	2:29
14.	"Sleep in the Grass"	Hazlewood	3:20
15.	"Chico"	Hazlewood	2:37
16.	"Sam"	Hazlewood	3:01
17.	"He Rode Away" (Backing Track)	Hazlewood	3:22

== Charts ==
Singles Charts	Title	Peak position
U.S Billboard Bubbling Under Chart	"Sleep in the Grass"	113
U.S Cash Box's Looking Ahead Chart.	"Sleep in the Grass"	109
U.S Record World Upcoming Singles Chart	"Sleep in the Grass"	113

== Personnel ==
- Ann-Margret – vocals
- Lee Hazlewood – vocals, producing
- Charlie McCoy – arranging
