= Movin' with Nancy (album) =

Soundtrack album by Nancy Sinatra
- Released: 1967
- Genre: Pop
- Length: 36:06
- Label: Reprise
- Producer: Lee Hazlewood

Singles from Movin' with Nancy
- 1. "Friday's Child" Released: June 1966; 2. "Some Velvet Morning" Released: December 1967

Professional ratings
Review scores
Source	Rating
AllMusic	3.5/5 stars

Movin' with Nancy is the soundtrack album to Nancy Sinatra's 1967 television special of the same name, released on Reprise Records in 1967. It features guest appearances from Frank Sinatra, Dean Martin, and Lee Hazlewood. Arranged and conducted by Billy Strange, the album was produced by Lee Hazlewood. It peaked at number 37 on the Billboard 200 chart. "Some Velvet Morning" was released as a single from the album.

== Track listing ==
No.	Title	Writer(s)	Length
1.	"I Gotta Get Out of This Town"	Lee Hazlewood	1:57
2.	"Who Will Buy"	Lionel Bart	4:51
3.	"Wait till You See Him"	Richard Rodgers, Lorenz Hart	2:04
4.	"Younger Than Springtime" (with Frank Sinatra)	Rodgers, Oscar Hammerstein II	2:40
5.	"Things" (with Dean Martin)	Bobby Darin	2:46
6.	"Some Velvet Morning" (with Lee Hazlewood)	Hazlewood	3:37
7.	"See the Little Children"	Hazlewood	2:59
8.	"Up, Up and Away"	Jimmy Webb	2:24
9.	"Friday's Child"	Hazlewood	2:24
10.	"Jackson" (with Lee Hazlewood)	Billy Edd Wheeler, Gaby Rodgers	2:45
11.	"This Town"	Hazlewood	2:57
12.	"What'd I Say"	Ray Charles	4:22

1996 reissue edition bonus tracks
No.	Title	Writer(s)	Producer(s)	Length
13.	"Drummer Man"	Murray Wecht	Billy Strange	3:18
14.	"I Love Them All (The Boys in the Band)"	Sandy Linzer	Bob Gaudio	2:52
15.	"Good Time Girl"	Mac Davis	Billy Strange	3:20

== Charts ==
Chart	Peak position
US Billboard 200	37
