= LHI =

LHI may refer to:

- Logistics Health Incorporated, American healthcare company
- Lord Howe Island, New South Wales, Australia
- LHI Records, defunct American record label
- Lehi (militant group), a Zionist paramilitary organization (1940-1948) also known as the "Stern Gang"
