= The Chase (1966 film) =

1966 American drama film directed by Arthur Penn

- Original film poster by Howard Terpning
- Directed by: Arthur Penn
- Screenplay by: Lillian Hellman
- Based on: The Chase; 1952 play 1956 novel by Horton Foote
- Produced by: Sam Spiegel
- Starring: Marlon Brando; Jane Fonda; Robert Redford; E. G. Marshall; Angie Dickinson
- Cinematography: Joseph LaShelle; Robert Surtees (uncredited)
- Edited by: Gene Milford
- Music by: John Barry
- Color process: Technicolor
- Production company: Horizon Pictures
- Distributed by: Columbia Pictures
- Release date: February 18, 1966
- Running time: 134 minutes
- Country: United States
- Language: English
- Box office: $3.3 million (est. U.S./Canada rentals)

The Chase is a 1966 American crime drama film directed by Arthur Penn, produced by Sam Spiegel, and written by Lillian Hellman, who adapted his screenplay from the 1952 play and 1956 novelization of the same name by Horton Foote. The neo-Western and neo-noir film stars Marlon Brando, Jane Fonda, and Robert Redford.

It tells the story of a series of chaotic events that are set into motion in a small town in rural Texas following a prison break. The film also features E. G. Marshall, Angie Dickinson, Janice Rule, Miriam Hopkins, Martha Hyer, Robert Duvall, and James Fox in supporting roles.

== Plot ==
In the mid-1960s, in a small town of Tarl, Texas, where banker Val Rogers wields a great deal of influence, word comes that native son Bubber Reeves and another man have escaped from prison.

Sheriff Calder, who continues to believe in Bubber's innocence, expects him to return to his hometown, where Bubber's lonely wife Anna is involved in a romantic affair with Jake, Bubber's best friend and Val Rogers' son.

Bubber is left on his own after the second fugitive kills a stranger for his car and clothes. The townspeople, conflicted about his guilt or innocence, socialize and drink heavily while awaiting Bubber's return. They include the hostile Emily Stewart, who openly expresses her lust for Damon Fuller in front of her cuckold husband Edwin.

As the drinking and quarreling intensify, a group of vigilantes demand action from Calder. When he defies them, they beat Calder brutally before the sheriff's loyal wife Ruby is able to get to his side.

Bubber sneaks into town, hiding in an auto junkyard. Anna and Jake willingly set out to help him, and the townspeople follow, turning the event into a drunken revelry and setting the junkyard on fire, causing an explosion which mortally wounds Jake. A bloodied and beaten Calder manages to get to Bubber first, but while he is leading him up the steps into the jail, one of the vigilantes, Archie, shoots Bubber multiple times with a gun hidden in his coat pocket.

Sick of the town and its people, Calder and Ruby leave town the next morning.

== Cast ==
- Marlon Brando as Sheriff Calder
- Jane Fonda as Anna Reeves
- Robert Redford as Bubber Reeves
- E. G. Marshall as Val Rogers
- Angie Dickinson as Ruby Calder
- Janice Rule as Emily Stewart
- Miriam Hopkins as Mrs. Reeves
- Martha Hyer as Mary Fuller
- Robert Duvall as Edwin Stewart
- Richard Bradford as Damon Fuller
- Henry Hull as Mr. Briggs
- Diana Hyland as Elizabeth Rogers
- James Fox as Jason "Jake" Rogers
- Jocelyn Brando as Mrs. Briggs
- Clifton James as Lem
- Malcolm Atterbury as Mr. Reeves
- Nydia Westman as Mrs. Westman
- Joel Fluellen as Lester Johnson
- Maurice Manson as Moore
- Bruce Cabot as Sol
- Steve Ihnat as Archie
- Lori Martin as Cutie
- Katherine Walsh as Verna Dee
- Paul Williams as Seymour

== Outline and production ==
The film deals with excessive immorality and vices such as themes of racism (including scenes in which black men are harassed by white men), sexual revolution (many of the characters are openly engaged in affairs), small-town corruption (the sheriff is falsely assumed to be in the pocket of the man who helped appoint him), and vigilantism (in the form of townspeople who openly defy the sheriff in their search for Bubber). The movie is perhaps best known for a scene in which the sheriff, played by Marlon Brando, is brutally beaten by Richard Bradford, one of the three vigilantes.

Singer-songwriter Paul Williams thought this movie would be his big break, but after working on the film for three months, he was shown on screen for a few moments – with "two lines" – in the finale of the film. Faye Dunaway auditioned for the film, but Jane Fonda was cast in the role of Anna Reeves. Following this, Arthur Penn tested Dunaway and cast her for Bonnie and Clyde.

== Reception ==
On release, the film gained generally positive reviews from critics, but Richard Schickel was dismissive in Life magazine. Pointing out its origins in the Horton Foote play, he wrote: "The Chase is no longer a modest failure...it has been turned into a disaster of awesome proportions".

The New York Times wrote:

Everything is intensely overheated in...'The Chase,' which blowtorched its way into the Sutton and the Victoria yesterday. The screenplay is overheated, the emotional content, the pictorial style, the directing, the acting, the fist-fighting, the burning of a junkyard at the end—everything. The only thing that is not overheated—at least I don't think it will be—is the audience's reaction. This is a picture to leave you cold. That's because it is so obvious and so outrageously clumsy an attempt to blend a weak but conceivably dramatic theme of civil rights with a whole mess of small-town misbehaviors of the sort that you get in 'Peyton Place.' It appears a deliberate endeavor to mix the message of 'High Noon' and sex.

The Chicago Tribune had more praise for the film's performances than for its plot:

The first five minutes...snap with the crispness of a good, old fashioned adventure story, but before director Arthur Penn can get his second wind it settles down into a modern-day morality play, a kind of barbecued Peyton Place with lots of lip-smackin' scandal....The script by Lillian Hellman...who should know better, is just as stilted as the characterizations....the part of the shuffling sheriff who finally leaps into action is custom-made for [Brando], who takes most of the punchlines as well as the punches. Angie Dickinson is surprisingly effective as his simple, loyal wife; Miss Fonda and Fox are believeable as one of the cheating couples, and Bradford and Duvall make a convincing bully and boob. Broadway's Redford [is] excellent as the muddled, dispirited Bubba . . . The few good story sequences are lost in the self-conscious Hard-Hitting Commentary on Racial Bigotry, Mob Violence and Moral Authority, so that 'The Chase' clocks in as a tiresome, inflated run-around which would have been more appropriately entitled 'Love on the Lam'.

During an interview years after the film was released, Arthur Penn expressed his dissatisfaction with the film: "Everything in that film was a letdown, and I'm sure every director has gone through the same experience at least once. It's a shame because it could have been a great film."

== See also ==
- List of American films of 1966
