= The Trip (1967 film) =

1967 American counterculture-era film directed by Roger Corman

- Theatrical release poster
- Directed by: Roger Corman
- Written by: Jack Nicholson
- Produced by: Roger Corman
- Starring: Peter Fonda; Susan Strasberg; Dennis Hopper; Bruce Dern; Salli Sachse
- Cinematography: Archie R. Dalzell
- Edited by: Ronald Sinclair; Montage Sequences: Dennis Jakob
- Music by: The Electric Flag
- Production company: American International Pictures
- Distributed by: American International Pictures
- Release date: July 25, 1967
- Running time: 82 minutes
- Country: United States
- Language: English
- Budget: $100,000
- Box office: $10 million

The Trip is a 1967 American psychedelic film produced and directed by Roger Corman and written by Jack Nicholson. It was shot on location in and around Los Angeles, including on top of Kirkwood in Laurel Canyon, the Hollywood Hills, and near Big Sur, California, over three weeks in March and April 1967. Peter Fonda stars as a young man who experiences his first LSD trip.

Released during the Summer of Love, The Trip was very popular, particularly with members of the era's counterculture. It became one of AIP's most successful releases and was important in the later development of an even larger cultural touchstone in Easy Rider, which involved many of the same personnel and appealed to the same young demographic.

== Plot ==
Paul Groves, a television commercial director, takes his first dose of LSD while experiencing the heartbreak and ambivalence of divorce from his beautiful but adulterous wife. He starts his trip with a "guide", John, but runs away and abandons him out of fear.

Experiencing repetitive visions of pursuit by dark hooded figures mounted on black horses, Paul sees himself running across a beach.

As Paul experiences his trip, he wanders around the Sunset Strip, into nightclubs, and into the homes of strangers and acquaintances. Paul considers the roles played by commercialism, sex, and women in his life. He meets a young woman, Glenn, who is interested in people who take LSD. Having learned from Paul recently that he would be taking LSD, she has been looking out for him. Max is another friendly guide to his trip.

Glenn drives Paul to her Malibu beach house, where they make love, interspersed in his mind with a kaleidoscopic riot of abstract images intercut with visions of pursuit on a beach. Driven into the surf by his pursuers, Paul turns and faces them, and they reveal themselves to be his wife and Glenn.

As the sun rises, Paul returns to his normal state of consciousness, now transformed by the trip, and steps out to the balcony to get some fresh air. Glenn asks him whether his first LSD experience was constructive. Paul defers his answer to "tomorrow."

== Cast ==
- Peter Fonda as Paul Groves
- Susan Strasberg as Sally Groves
- Bruce Dern as John
- Dennis Hopper as Max
- Salli Sachse as Glenn
- Barboura Morris as Flo
- Judy Lang as Nadine
- Luana Anders as Waitress
- Dick Miller as Cash
- Caren Bernsen as Alexandria
- Katherine Walsh as Lulu
- Barbara Ransom as Barbara
- Michael Blodgett as Sally's Lover
- Tom Signorelli as Al
- Mitzi Hoag as Al's Wife

Uncredited:

- Susan Walters as Go-Go Girl
- Peter Bogdanovich as Paul's Cameraman
- Brandon deWilde as Paul's Assistant Director
- Gram Parsons as Band member

== Production ==
I wanted the picture not to be a pro-LSD picture and not to be an anti-LSD picture because my trip was very good, I had no bad effects in my trip at all. It was wonderful. Yet I felt I really shouldn’t be accused of proselytizing for LSD, and at the same time I knew people had had bad trips, so I was trying to be neutral, and I had to ask people what had happened on their bad trips, and incorporate some of what they had experienced into it to make it neutral.
– Roger Corman, 2003

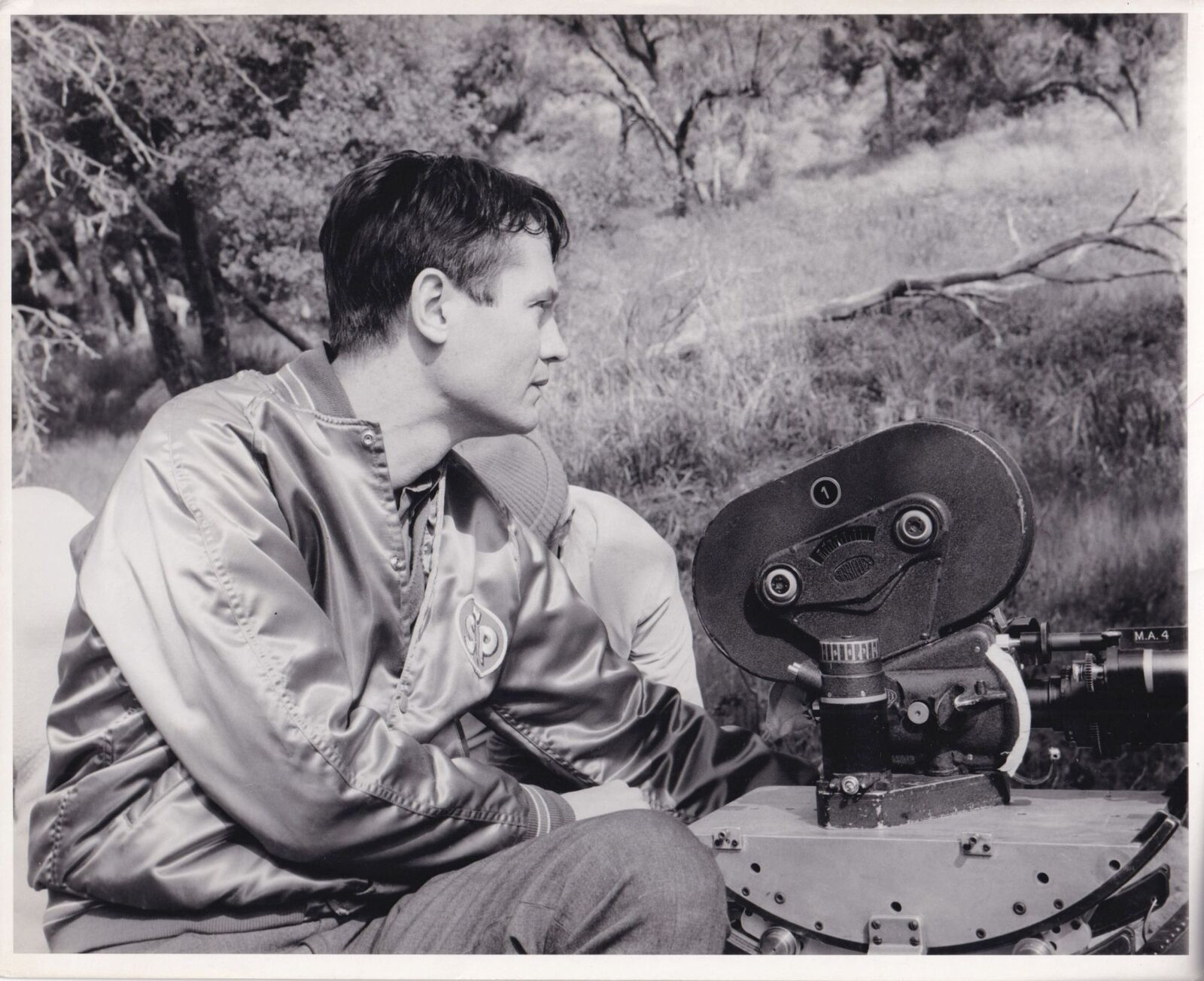
Corman on set of The Trip

The film was first announced as early as July 12, 1966, in the Los Angeles Times with Daniel Haller considered to direct, although Corman soon took over the project. Peter Fonda's agents had warned him against taking the lead role, as he already had a bad public reputation with drugs including a recent arrest for marijuana; Fonda was adamant, however, and even performed for a reduced salary. Nancy Sinatra, who had starred with Fonda in The Wild Angels, was also briefly considered for a role.

Corman did research by taking LSD himself while scouting locations at Big Sur, noting it was under "strict medical supervision" with a stenographer to record what happened, and stated that the film would not be unsympathetic to the drug. Charles B. Griffith wrote the first two drafts of the script; the first one was about the social issues of the sixties; the second one was an opera. Corman then hired Jack Nicholson to write the eventual screenplay. Corman encouraged Nicholson's experimental writing style and gives between 80 and 90% credit to Nicholson for the shooting script in the director's commentary. Corman slightly modified the story to stay within budget.

On using Nicholson as a screenwriter, Corman said, "I hired him because I knew he was a very good writer. He had written several scripts before. His career wasn't really doing that much at that time. I knew he had experience with LSD, so I hired him as a writer. I was thinking of possibly using Jack for the role that Bruce Dern played. But I wanted to repeat some of the casting, particularly Peter Fonda and Bruce Dern from The Wild Angels, so I went with Bruce for that reason." AIP executive Samuel Z. Arkoff recalled "The first draft of Jack's script turned out to be immense--about three inches thick. He had crammed nearly every social and political concern of the sixties into it. He also had included so many special effects that it would have challenged the creative talents and the budgets of George Lucas. According to Fonda biographer Peter Collier, upon reading this initial draft, the actor allegedly cried and proclaimed it would be the greatest American film ever made.

Filming began on March 29, 1967 and lasted approximately three weeks. The interior of the house with the indoor/outdoor pool where Fonda takes his LSD trip was located on Blue Heights Drive near Laurel Canyon and occupied at the time by Arthur Lee of the band Love. According to Corman, most of the intensely psychedelic decor seen in the house had already been set up by Lee with little additional decoration needed. The house can also be seen in the promotional film for Love's 1968 single "Your Mind and We Belong Together". The large circular main room of the house seen at the beginning with Dennis Hopper was shot at the San Souci Culture Temple on Ardmore Ave., which had been renamed "The Psychedelic Temple"; it would also be used as the gallery in Psych-Out. Corman also had Hopper film Fonda wandering across desert dunes in Yuma, Arizona and Big Dune, Nevada for some of the vision sequences of the trip. For the topless sequence at the Bead Game club, shot at an actual L.A. establishment, assistant director Paul Rapp admitted passing around hundreds of amyl nitrate poppers to the dancing extras to "get their energy up a pitch".

Roger Corman wildly edited some scenes for The Trip, particularly the exterior night scenes on the Sunset Strip, to simulate the LSD user's racing mind. The Trip also features photographic effects, body paint on seminude actresses to lend atmosphere, and colorful patterned lighting, both during sex scenes and in a club, which imitates LSD-induced hallucinations. Assistant cameraman Allen Daviau recalled that "Bob used liquid light projectors. He used strobe lights. He used all kinds of devices for changing color gels in the middle of a shot". Many of the special effects in the film were developed by Peter Gardiner, who had caught the attention of Fonda just days before filming began. Finally, Corman included inscrutable fantasy sequences including one where Fonda is faced with revolving pictures of Che Guevara, Sophia Loren and Khalil Gibran in a wildly lit room. For no apparent reason, a little person riding a merry-go-round in the background blurts "Bay of Pigs!!"

The story plays over a backdrop of improvisational jazz, blues rock, and electronic music by Mike Bloomfield's new band The Electric Flag, including an exotic organ and horn-drenched theme. Gram Parsons and the International Submarine Band, seen as the band rehearsing in a club at the start of the film, are one of the earliest country-rock acts. It had been Fonda's original intention to use ISB music in the soundtrack, which resulted in the group recording the song "Lazy Days" to be used in the film. However, the song wasn't considered psychedelic enough to be used for the scene the band appeared in, and music by The Electric Flag (aka "An American Music Band") is what is actually heard in the film. The Electric Flag's soundtrack to The Trip features some of the earliest use of the Moog synthesizer on a pop/rock record. Peter Fonda claimed to Esquire that Corman abandoned the film before scoring was completed, leading Fonda to spend an additional $7,500 of his own money on the music; this claim was disputed by Corman.

Salli Sachse, who played Glenn, recalled working on the film:

Roger was a very linear director–everything went from A to B to C. He was very serious. You didn't goof off or kick back while working with him. You had to be very on-task. It was a stricter atmosphere than I was used to. Roger felt that there had to be a distinction between Susan Strasberg's character and mine, so he wanted me to appear as a blonde... The Trip didn't deserve all the bad press it received. There was no drug use going on during filming–it was strictly professional. Maybe after hours, but I couldn't talk for anybody else.

AIP insisted on making two modifications to the final cut of the film: an opening pre-credit monologue warning of the dangers of LSD, and an effect of "shattered glass" over Fonda's face in the final shot to imply that taking the drug had left him shattered and confused. When Corman heard about these modifications he was upset, feeling that the ending of the film should be left ambiguous. AIP also obscured the images on the television screen in the scene where Fonda wanders into a middle-class suburban home, because it contained grisly news footage of the Vietnam War.

== Release ==
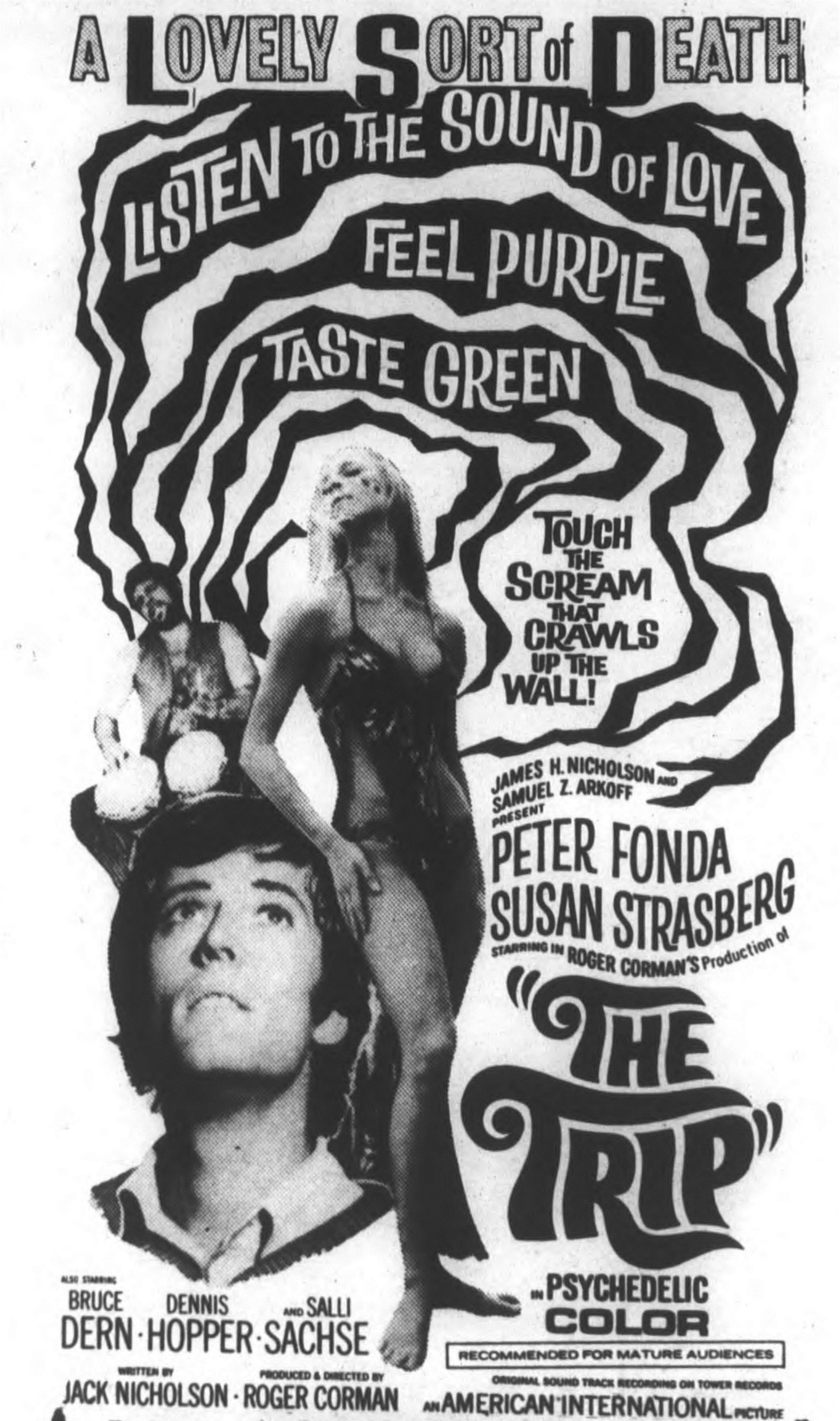
Newspaper advertisement for The Trip

Released on 25 July 1967 during the "Summer of Love", the film had a huge cultural impact and grossed $6 million against a budget of $300,000. Corman commented on the popularity of the film, "I think that one of the reasons that the audience came in such large numbers was out of curiosity. They didn't really want to take LSD, but the reviews and comments said this came somewhat close to an LSD experience, so they could take it without taking it".

The National Association of Broadcasters (NAB) put out an advisory to TV stations against running ads for the film, due to certain ads featuring Fonda's nude backside and language describing the hallucinatory effects of LSD. The film itself encountered censorship problems in the UK and was refused a certificate four times by the BBFC. A cinema classification was rejected in 1967, 1971 and 1980 and again for video in 1988. It was released on DVD fully uncut in 2004.

== Reception ==
Upon the film's release, initial reviews were highly polarized. The Los Angeles Times enthusiastically called it "the most unabashed art film ever to come out of Hollywood...Ingmar Bergman for the teenyboppers, Dali for the drive-ins". Conversely, Bosley Crowther of The New York Times wrote, "Is this a psychedelic experience? Is this what it's like to take a trip? If it is, then it's all a big put-on. Or is this simply making a show with adroitly staged fantasy episodes and good color photography effects? In my estimation, it is the latter. And I would warn you that all you are likely to take away from the Rivoli or the 72d Street Playhouse, where the picture opened yesterday, is a painful case of eye-strain and perhaps a detached retina."

Time magazine wrote, "The Trip is a psychedelic tour through the bent mind of Peter Fonda, which is evidently full of old movies. In a flurry of flesh, mattresses, flashing lights and kaleidoscopic patterns, an alert viewer will spot some fancy business from such classics as The Seventh Seal, Lawrence of Arabia, even The Wizard of Oz... The photographer's camera work is bright enough, and full of tricks, without beginning to suggest the heightened inner awareness so frequently claimed by those who use the drug." Meanwhile, Judith Crist of The Today Show savaged the film as "little more than an hour-and-a-half commercial for LSD...The subject matter enables the director to make a totally incoherent movie with erratic, repetitious and fake-arty effects that simply nauseate, both intellectually and physically".

Gene Youngblood of Los Angeles Free Press wrote, "Corman's film is not fine art; more precisely, it's not refined art. But it is possibly the purest cinematic exercise ever to come out of Hollywood. Here, for the first time to my knowledge, Hollywood gives us a truly cinematic experience: a visual film, structured literally of pictures that move; a montage that is brisk and relatively arbitrary; a storyline that is appreciably abstract, and, most important, a film that pays tribute to the power of the image over the word — this from an industry in which most movies are merely photographed radio scripts." Another positive review came from American Cinematographer, who concluded "The Trip is technically and visually one of the most spectacular pictures ever made.

The Chicago Tribune wrote: "'The Trip' is a wild, wiggy film which superficially explores the effects of LSD through a color kaleidoscope of frenzied fantasies—a kind of psychedelic smorgasbord of freaked-out Fellini....A few of Corman's scenes employ the best of experimental film-making techniques....For the most part, however, his frames are cluttered with Hollywoodish hallucinations which have a phony posture...they soon grow wearysome....Director Corman shouldn't be criticized for not taking a stand on the controversial subject or the social implications....However, he can be criticized for making a sputtering, incohesive, rather tedious movie."

Writing for FilmInk, Stephen Vagg argued the film "proved to Corman that you could make personal movies as long as they had authenticity and naked women."

The movie holds a 39% "Rotten" score on Rotten Tomatoes based on 23 critics with the consensus: "The Trip's groovy effects and compelling message can't overcome the rough acting, long meandering stretches, and pedestrian plot." Nonetheless, the film retains a strong cult following, particularly in Europe, where it is hailed for its application of various New Wave cinema techniques within the Hollywood system.

=== Box office ===
The movie was very popular: Corman says it took $6 million in rentals during its initial release. According to Variety, its North American revenue reached $5.1 million, and its total revenue is estimated at $10 million.

Despite being one of American International Pictures' (AIP) most profitable films, Samuel Z. Arkoff said they stopped making "dope pictures" soon after The Trip because he sensed the cycle would exhaust itself quickly. In 1974 he said "everybody else picked it up; and as late as last year they were still coming out with dope pictures. And there isn't one single company that made a buck on dope pictures. The young people had turned off." However AIP did make another drug related film with Strasberg, Dern and Nicholson, Psych Out.

== Peter Fonda Interview ==
In September 1967, Peter Fonda visited Chicago while promoting the new film. He spoke of Roger Corman's contributions, deleted scenes, and the LSD experience: “Corman just didn't explore the possibilities that 'The Trip' offers. I don't want to cop out, man, but it should have been done totally surrealistically, with the effect of 'Last Year at Marienbad.' But he blew it. Corman is a brilliant producer, but as a director he crams his frames full of stuff to make it look like he's got an expensive picture. But even tho it isn't surrealistic, at least it isn't girls on the beach popping pills....'The Trip'....has no moral point of view. But kids won't see it and then run and take acid. I don't think they will. And the adults—man, they hate it. They just sit there looking at the screen, and they hate it. Some of the stuff was snipped out. In the 'judgment scene,' which attacks western morality, they had this beautiful chick in a bikini telling how to cook a turkey—about how you pop it in the oven and all—and then, in a flash, shots of Auschwitz and Buchenwald fly by. And later, there's a guy standing beside some aluminum boxes, smiling, and the boxes contain bodies from Viet Nam. They made us cut all that out.” Peter Fonda also reported having taken eleven LSD trips over an 18-month period. “For me, LSD is at once terrifying and beautiful. By taking it, I was able to expose myself to myself. But it's like flying a 707 jet. You can't just get in there and fly, or you'll kill everyone. You have to know what you're doing. Otherwise you'll continue to have people who take it and jump through a window or in front of a train--and it does happen….LSD has got to be taken off the streets, and given to the hospitals and shrinks [psychologists] because it's a therapeutic drug.”

== Home media ==
The Trip was released in a Region 1 DVD by MGM on April 15, 2003, as part of their Midnite Movies series doubled with a similar film, Psych-Out (1968), on a double-sided disc.

In 2015, the MGM HD channel broadcast a newly constructed "Director's Cut" of the film, which removed the opening disclaimer and the "shattered glass" ending imposed by AIP, as well as restoring additional footage to the Bead Game club party scene and exit music previously clipped on home video releases. This alternate version was later released on Blu-ray in Region B by Signal One films that year, and on Region A Blu-ray by Olive Films in 2016. The Signal One Blu-ray retained special features created for the previous MGM DVD, including a Roger Corman commentary track, and offered the AIP-mandated scenes (with Corman commentary) as bonus material. The Olive Blu-ray did not port any of the special features, but did include the original trailer.

== In other media ==
In 2004, film historian Tim Lucas and his friend Charlie Largent's screenplay The Man with Kaleidoscope Eyes, which serves as a fictionalized account on the making of The Trip, was optioned by Corman's frequent collaborator Joe Dante. After years of development on the script, which included rewrites by Michael Almereyda and James Robison, as well as Elijah Wood joining development as a co-producer through his company SpectreVision, a live table read of the script was hosted at the Vista Theater in Los Angeles on October 12, 2016. Moderated by Dante, the cast included Bill Hader as Corman, Jason Ritter as Fonda, Ethan Embry as Nicholson, Claudia O'Doherty as Corman's assistant Frances Doel and Pat Healy as screenwriter Charles B. Griffith, with James Adomian and Sarah Burns portraying other characters and Corman playing an older version of himself. Writing for IndieWire, Steve Greene praised the presentation of the reading and the "element of playful investigation" in Hader's portrayal of Corman; in an interview about the project, Lucas described Hader's performance as "remarkable and funny".

Lucas later adapted the script of The Man with Kaleidoscope Eyes into a novel, which was published by PS Publishing through their Electric Dreamhouse imprint in April 2022 in a signed hardback edition limited to 100 copies, a retail hardback edition and an eBook. The author revealed that details about Corman and the setting within the novel were expanded upon compared to the screenplay, drawing on correspondence with Doel and Julie Corman.

== See also ==
- List of American films of 1967
- List of cult films
- List of films featuring hallucinogens
- The Psychedelic Experience (1965 film)
