= Urchin (album) =

Studio album by Inga Liljeström
- Released: 1998
- Genre: Alternative rock; electronica; experimental; trip hop
- Length: 51:42
- Label: Independent
- Producer: Bob Scott & Inga

Inga Liljeström chronology
Urchin (1998)	Elk (2005)

Urchin is the first solo album by Inga Liljeström. It was independently released in 1998 under the name of "Inga". It was re-released through Groovescooter Records in 2007.

== Track listing ==
1. "Holding Still" – 3:34
2. "Yellohead" – 3:47
3. "The Drowning Song" – 3:03
4. "Cut" – 3:18
5. "Coma" – 2:53
6. "Tightness" – 6:07
7. "Oxygen Boy" – 3:20
8. "Marmalade" – 1:24
9. "Coma Remix" – 3:18
10. "The Wait" – 1:28
11. "Deeper Things" - 4:20
12. "10 Smiles" - 3:25
13. "Touch Tongue" - 9:53
  - (includes hidden track)
