= Lazy Days (Gram Parsons song) =

"Lazy Days" is a 1967 song by Gram Parsons which he recorded with three groups: The International Submarine Band, The Byrds in 1968 and The Flying Burrito Bros. in 1970.

The song was originally recorded for The International Submarine Band's cameo appearance in Roger Corman's psychedelic film, The Trip (1967) but was replaced with music by The Electric Flag. The recording with The Byrds was not released till the Byrds box set and the 1997 reissue of Sweetheart of the Rodeo. The recording with The Flying Burrito Bros. was released on a single in 1970 and on Burrito Deluxe. A performance of the song by The Flying Burrito Bros. can be seen on the DVD Festival Express, although Parsons was no longer in the band at this time.
