= Honey Ltd. =

American 1960s girl group

- Top: Alexandra, Marsha. Bottom: Laura, Joan

Background information
- Origin: Detroit, Michigan, United States
- Genres: Pop, psychedelic pop
- Years active: 1968-1970
- Label: LHI Records
- Past members: Laura Polkinghorne; Marsha Temmer; Alexandra Sliwin; Joan Sliwin

Honey Ltd. was an American 1960s girl group consisting of sisters Alexandra and Joan Sliwin, Laura Polkinghorne and Marsha Temmer.

== Background ==
The group members began singing with each other at Wayne State University. They formed the Mama Cats and began performing in local venues with other Detroit-based musicians like Bob Seger (who wrote both sides of their first single), Glenn Frey and Suzi Quatro. The group relocated to Los Angeles, where they auditioned for producer Lee Hazlewood, who signed them immediately and took them to the studio to record with backing from the famed Wrecking Crew. He would later rename them Honey Ltd.

Frey was the boyfriend of bandmember Joan Sliwin and followed her to Los Angeles. He was introduced to JD Souther by Joan's sister and bandmate, Alexandra Sliwin.

== Career ==
The group did not achieve widespread commercial success and only released one album. Their version of Laura Nyro's Eli's Comin' was well received but was eclipsed by Three Dog Night's version released a few months later. In 1969 the group joined Bob Hope on a USO tour and headed to Thailand and Vietnam to perform for the troops. Television appearances in 1968-1969 included The Ed Sullivan Show, The Joey Bishop Show, Kraft Music Hall, The Jerry Lewis Show, The Andy Williams Show, Operation: Entertainment, and The Bob Hope Christmas Special: Around the World with the USO.

By 1970 Alexandra Sliwin had dropped out of the group to marry Souther. The remaining members continued as a trio with a name change to Eve. The new group released another album that went unnoticed and were subsequently dropped by LHI. They split up shortly after and went on to varied musical careers as singers and songwriters.

Laura Creamer (née Polkinghorne) is a songwriter, vocalist, and arranger who has recorded and/or toured with Billy Joel, Bob Seger, Van Morrison, Glenn Frey, Bruce Hornsby, Kid Rock, Eric Clapton, Thomas Dolby, and many others. She is credited as a backing vocalist on multiple albums including Billy Joel's 1973 Piano Man. Her West of Detroit CD was released in 2001.

Alex Sliwin, Joan Sliwin, and Marsha Temmer were in the short-lived group Bijou with former Association members Jules Alexander and Russ Giguere, and subsequently wrote and performed with Loretta Lynn and others. Marsha Temmer Darigan continued with studio work plus a stint as a backup singer/dancer for Tina Turner. Her songwriting credits include a track for the Angel movie series and, along with Alex Sliwin, many of the songs for the "musical novel" UnderWing. The Sliwin sisters are still actively performing as Like Honey.

In 2013, a compilation CD titled Honey Ltd. - The Complete LHI Recordings was released featuring tracks recorded during the group's tenure at LHI. The CD includes all eight songs from the first album, two songs released only as singles, and three previously unreleased songs.

== Discography ==
=== Studio albums ===
- 1968: Honey Ltd. (LHI-12002) (Note: Vinyl LP is rare. Also released on cassette tape. Reissued in 2012 as part of the Psychedelic Folk Essentials series by Vintage Masters Inc. Includes eight original LP tracks plus three bonus tracks. Available only as mp3 download.)
- 1970: Take It And Smile (as Eve) (LHI-3100) (Note: Reissued in 2011 on CD by Kismet (KISCD4016). Includes all 10 original LP tracks plus bonus track "So Tired" from the Vanishing Point movie soundtrack.)

=== Compilations ===
- 2013: Honey Ltd - The Complete LHI Recordings (Light in the Attic Records, LITA 102) (Note: Released on CD, limited edition cassette (500), and special edition 180 gram 12" vinyl.)

=== Singles ===
- 1967: "Miss You"/"My Boy" (as Mama Cats) (Hideout 1225)
- 1968: "Come Down"/"Tomorrow Your Heart" (LHI-1208)
- 1968: "Louie, Louie" (with Lee Hazlewood intro)/"Louie, Louie" (LHI-1216 promo)
- 1969: "Eli's Coming"/"Silk 'N' Honey" (LHI-3)
- 1969: "Silver Threads and Golden Needles"/"No You Are" (LHI-12)
- 1970: "Anyone Who Had a Heart"/"Dusty Roads" (as Eve) (LHI-25)
- 1970: "Take It And Smile"/"You Go Your Way" (as Eve) (Bell 914)
- 1975: "Carry On"/"Children of the Highway" (as Bijou) (A&M 1678)

=== Soundtrack ===
- 1971: Vanishing Point - "So Tired" (as Eve) (Amos Records AAS8002) (Note: Released in UK on London SHU 8420. Re-released on CD in 2004 on Sound Track Classics SCL 1410-2.)

=== Other appearances ===
- 1987: Girls In The Garage Volume 2 (Romulan Records UFOX03) - "Miss You" (as Mama Cats) (Note: "Miss You" is on the original vinyl LP release only. Not included on the 1997 CD reissue.)
- 2002: Boyd Rice Presents Music for Pussycats (Caciocavallo CAD 13) - "The Warrior", "Silk & Honey"
- 2002: Just The Right Sound: The Association Anthology (Rhino Records, 8122783032) - "Carry On" (as Bijou)
- 2010: Lost Sixties Delights Volume 6 (U-Spaces) - "Come Down"
- 2010: ...Next Stop Is Vietnam (The War on Record 1961-2008) (Bear Family Records BCD16070, 13-CD set) - "The Warrior"
- 2012: Lee Hazlewood - You Turned My Head Around - Lee Hazlewood Industries 1967-70 (Light in the Attic Records, LITA 094, 7" vinyl box set, 11 records) - "Tomorrow Your Heart" & "Come Down" (as Honey Ltd.), "Anyone Who Had A Heart" & "Dusty Roads" (as Eve).
- 2013: Lee Hazlewood - There's A Dream I've Been Saving (Light in the Attic Records, CD promo) - "Silk 'n' Honey"
- 2013: Lee Hazlewood - There's A Dream I've Been Saving (Light in the Attic Records, LITA 109, 4-CD box set) - "Tomorrow Your Heart" & "Silk 'n' Honey" (as Honey Ltd.), "Dusty Roads" & "Hello L.A., Bye Bye Birmingham" (as Eve).
- 2014: Night Walker: The Jack Nitzsche Story, Volume 3 (Ace Records, CDCHD 1430) - "Louie Louie"
- 2016: Where The Girls Are, Volume 9 (Ace Records CDCHD 1431) - "Come Down"
