= Movin' with Nancy =

1967 television special

- Print advertisement
- Written by: Tom Mankiewicz
- Directed by: Jack Haley Jr.
- Starring: Nancy Sinatra; Lee Hazlewood; Dean Martin; Frank Sinatra; Sammy Davis Jr.; David Winters
- Theme music composer: Billy Strange
- Country of origin: United States
- Original language: English

Production
- Producer: Nancy Sinatra
- Editors: David E. Blewitt; David Saxon
- Running time: 60 minutes

Original release
- Network: NBC
- Release: December 11, 1967

Movin' with Nancy is a 1967 television special featuring Nancy Sinatra in a series of musical vignettes featuring her and other artists. Produced by Nancy's production company Boots Enterprises, Inc. and sponsored by Royal Crown Cola, the show was originally broadcast on the NBC television network on December 11, 1967.

== Summary ==
The TV special was unlike most musical programs of its time, with the numbers lip-synced outdoors on locations instead of the usual stage-bound production filmed before a live audience. Nancy sings while driving down the highway, strolling in the California countryside and aloft in a hot-air balloon. She performs duets with guest stars whom she encounters along the way, with no introductions or interstitial dialog. The general effect is that of a dream-like fantasy that flows from one location to the next, with segments resembling the later format of music videos.

The program includes an interracial kiss between Nancy and Sammy Davis Jr. at the end of a song-and-dance number. Nancy states in the commentary track on the DVD release that the seemingly spontaneous kiss was carefully planned and deliberately timed for the end of filming, when Davis had to leave for another job and could not shoot a retake.

== Production ==
Movin' with Nancy was produced and directed by Jack Haley Jr., who won his first of two Emmy Awards for directing, with Nancy billed as executive producer and star. It features guest appearances by her father Frank Sinatra, Dean Martin (her "fairy goduncle" who performs a solo song and a duet with her), Lee Hazlewood (who wrote most of her hit songs), dancer David Winters (who was also nominated for a special Emmy for his choreography) and Sammy Davis Jr.

RC Cola sponsored the show and created five lavish commercials. In two of them, Nancy danced and sang the RC jingle ("It's a Mad, Mad, Mad, Mad Cola!"). Art Linkletter served as the narrator for two of the commercials that opened and closed the program.

== Soundtrack ==
Song list
Title	Written by	Performed by
"I Gotta Get Out of This Town"	Lee Hazlewood	Nancy Sinatra
"Up, Up and Away"	Jimmy Webb	Nancy Sinatra
"Sugar Town"	Lee Hazlewood	Nancy Sinatra
"Some Velvet Morning"	Lee Hazlewood	Nancy Sinatra, Lee Hazlewood
"Jackson"	Jerry Leiber, Billy Edd-Wheeler	Nancy Sinatra, Lee Hazlewood
"This Town"	Lee Hazlewood	Nancy Sinatra
"Just Bummin' Around"	Pete Graves	Dean Martin
"Things"	Bobby Darin	Dean Martin, Nancy Sinatra
"What'd I Say?"	Ray Charles	Sammy Davis Jr., Nancy Sinatra
"Wait Till You See Him" (orig. "Her")	Rodgers and Hart	Nancy Sinatra
"Younger Than Springtime"	Rodgers and Hammerstein	Frank Sinatra
"Friday's Child"	Lee Hazlewood	Nancy Sinatra
"See the Little Children"	Lee Hazlewood	Nancy Sinatra
"Who Will Buy?"	Lionel Bart	Nancy Sinatra

A companion soundtrack album was released by Reprise Records and features all of the program's songs except for "Sugar Town" and "Just Bummin' Around".

The booklet for the soundtrack release on compact disc erroneously noted that the special had aired instead on CBS rather than on NBC.

== Sequels ==
Two other Movin' with Nancy specials followed after the success of the original broadcast. Movin' with Nancy on Stage aired in 1971 and was presented by The Ed Sullivan Show. It features the Osmond Brothers among its guests. Movin' with Nancy Nice 'n' Easy was produced in 1973 (but unfinished) and featured the Muppets.

== Home media ==
The special was released on DVD by Image Entertainment on May 2, 2000. It features a commentary track by director Jack Haley Jr. and Nancy, who reflects on her wardrobe and regrets not including her signature song, "These Boots Are Made for Walkin'", as part of the production. She also mentions that the RC Cola commercials were designed to be an integral part of the show.

Movin' with Nancy aired on American Movie Classics on May 6 and 27, 2000. It was also shown on Turner Classic Movies on October 8, 2021, when she co-hosted with Ben Mankiewicz, a cousin of the special's writer Tom Mankiewicz.

== See also ==
- First interracial kiss on television
