= Quiet Music for Quiet People =

Studio album by Inga Liljeström
- Released: 2006
- Recorded: August 2006
- Genre: Alternative; ambient; experimental; improvised music
- Length: 56:42
- Label: Vitamin Records
- Producer: Inga Liljeström

Inga Liljeström chronology
Sprawling Fawns (2006)	Quiet Music for Quiet People (2006)

Quiet Music for Quiet People is a completely improvised project featuring Inga Liljeström on vocals. It was recorded over two nights in August 2006. It was an experiment in improvised ambient music.

== Track listing ==
1. "Slowly Surfacing" - 6:37
2. "Everything Feels Real" - 5:19
3. "Fall" - 8:24
4. "Red Afternoon" - 5:15
5. "Strange Days" - 8:02
6. "Lost Highway" - 2:30
7. "Sleep Longer" - 5:14
8. "A Place Near the Mouth" - 3:58
9. "Lumen" - 11:23
  - (includes hidden track)
