= Katherine Walsh (actress) =

American actress (1947–1970)

- Born: Katherine Victoria Walsh; April 11, 1947; Kenton County, Kentucky, U.S.
- Died: October 7, 1970 (aged 23); Kensington, London, England
- Occupation: Actress
- Years active: 1961–1968

Katherine Victoria Walsh (April 11, 1947 – October 7, 1970) was an American actress best known for her performance as Lulu in Roger Corman's movie The Trip (1967).

== Early life ==
Walsh was born on April 11, 1947, in Kenton County, Kentucky, (or South Fort Mitchell, Kentucky), to Martha and Thomas Walsh. Her father, Thomas Walsh (died 1965), was President of the Atlantic Underwriters Agency. He was killed in the November 8, 1965, crash of American Airlines Flight 383 in Boone County, Kentucky. She was the family's oldest child, and she had two brothers and two sisters.

Walsh attended Villa Madonna Academy, Dixie Heights High School, the Royal Academy of Dramatic Art in London, England, and the University of London.

Walsh was discovered at Paramount Studios by a William Morris agent while she was having lunch with a girlfriend. The agent took Walsh to Columbia, where she read scenes, had an interview, and had a screen test. Columbia signed her under a then-new expanded talent program. She was 17 at the time, and Judge Ben Koenig of Los Angeles Superior Court approved the long-term contract.

== Career ==
Walsh made her acting debut in the 1966 film The Chase. She went on to guest star in television shows such as The Monkees (in the debut episode, "Royal Flush"), The Virginian, and Daniel Boone.

Walsh is best known for the last professional acting assignment of her career, as Lulu in The Trip (1967), starring Dennis Hopper and Peter Fonda, written by Jack Nicholson, and directed by Roger Corman.

== Death ==
On October 7, 1970, Walsh died while at a small party in her flat in Kensington, an area in London, England. The Coroner's report in London returned an open verdict because of insufficient evidence, concluding death was due to alcohol and barbiturate poisoning, but that it had been impossible to establish whether the death was due to suicide or accident.

== See also ==
- List of unsolved deaths
