= Requiem for an Almost Lady =

Studio album by Lee Hazlewood
- Released: 1971
- Recorded: June 1971
- Studio: Hollywood, California
- Genre: Country
- Length: 23:25
- Label: Viking
- Producer: Lee Hazlewood, Suzanne Jennings

Lee Hazlewood chronology
Cowboy in Sweden (1970)	Requiem for an Almost Lady (1971)	13 (1972)

Requiem for an Almost Lady is a studio album by Lee Hazlewood, released in 1971.

== Critical reception ==
Professional ratings
Review scores
Source	Rating
AllMusic	4/5 stars
Pitchfork	8.4/10

Stanton Swihart of AllMusic gave the album 4 stars out of 5, describing it as "one of the most beautifully agonizing breakup records to ever hit wax, culled from a composite of Hazlewood's relationships gone wrong."

== Track listing ==
All tracks are written by Lee Hazlewood.

No.	Title	Length
1.	"I'm Glad I Never..."	1:04
2.	"If It's Monday Morning"	3:54
3.	"L.A. Lady"	2:20
4.	"Won't You Tell Your Dreams"	3:52
5.	"I'll Live Yesterdays"	2:50
6.	"Little Miss Sunshine (Little Miss Rain)"	2:33
7.	"Stone Lost Child"	2:02
8.	"Come on Home to Me"	2:58
9.	"Must Have Been Something I Loved"	1:40
10.	"I'd Rather Be Your Enemy"	2:12

2017 reissue edition bonus tracks
No.	Title	Length
11.	"I Just Learned to Run" (Outtake)	3:04
12.	"Little Bird" (Demo)	2:42

== Personnel ==
Credits adapted from liner notes.

- Lee Hazlewood – vocals, arrangement, production
- Donnie Owens – rhythm guitar, arrangement
- Jerry Cole – guitar, bass guitar, sitar, arrangement
- Joe Cannon – guitar, harmonica
- Jim Walters – engineering
- Suzanne Jennings – executive production
- Pelle Metréus – design
- Ardy – cover painting
