= Safe at Home =

Studio album by The International Submarine Band
- Released: March 1968
- Recorded: July–December, 1967
- Studio: Western Sound (Studio B)
- Genre: Country rock
- Length: 26:19
- Label: LHI
- Producer: Suzi Jane Hokom

Professional ratings
Review scores
Source	Rating
AllMusic	4.5/5 stars

Safe at Home is a 1968 album by country rock group the International Submarine Band, led by the then-unknown 21-year-old Gram Parsons. The group's only album release, Safe at Home featured four of Parsons' original compositions rounded out by six covers of classic country and rock and roll songs made famous by the likes of Johnny Cash, Elvis Presley, Merle Haggard, and Hank Snow. Described as "hippie and hillbilly in equal measure", the album helped to forge the burgeoning country rock movement of the late 1960s and early 1970s.

== Overview ==
Recording of Safe at Home began in July 1967 for Lee Hazlewood's LHI Records, with the group's official lineup consisting solely of Parsons and lead guitarist John Nuese. Session musicians rounded out the lineup for recording: drummer Jon Corneal, bassist Joe Osborn, pedal steel guitarist Jay Dee Maness and pianist Earl "Les" Ball. Hazlewood's girlfriend Suzi Jane Hokom was assigned by LHI to produce the album. Corneal, a childhood friend of Parsons, soon joined the band as a full member. Recorded during these initial sessions were the Parsons originals "Blue Eyes" and "Luxury Liner", soon issued on a 45 single. With the additions of guitarist Bob Buchanan and bassist Chris Ethridge, the group gigged around the west coast over the next few months. Ethridge and Parsons would play together often in the coming years, with both the Flying Burrito Brothers and the Fallen Angels.

Four months later, with the group's line-up consisting of Parsons, Nuese, Corneal and Buchanan (augmented by Ball, Maness and Ethridge) the group again entered the studio and recorded two new Parsons-penned originals, "Strong Boy" and "Do You Know How It Feels To Be Lonesome" along with seven covers, six of which ended up on the original album. By early December, the album was finished and given a target release date of late January or early February 1968, in order to avoid the Christmas rush.

Prior to its release, Parsons left the band after accepting an offer to join The Byrds, and Safe at Home lay dormant for months. According to Corneal, Parsons became so caught up in his new role in The Byrds that he barely acknowledged Safe at Home as its release approached. "I don't think he wanted to look back, but just keep going in the direction he wanted to go", said Corneal. Rock journalist John Einarson surmised decades later that Parsons abandoned his band and his friends without a second thought once the opportunity to join The Byrds was presented to him.

After months of legal wrangling, with the group unable to find a suitable replacement for Parsons, the album was finally released. Though Hazelwood saw no point in devoting a promotional budget to a band which essentially no longer existed and were unavailable to promote the album, Safe at Home nonetheless received rave reviews from the likes of Glen Campbell, Merle Haggard, and Don Everly. "The album got buried", according to producer Hokom, who noted that Hazelwood was a musician first and foremost and not a businessman, and he may have erred in failing to market the release.

As part of the legal settlement resulting from Parsons' abrupt departure from The International Submarine Band, The Byrds' 1968 album Sweetheart of the Rodeo had much of Parsons' lead vocals removed and re-recorded by Roger McGuinn. This would be one of Parsons' chief gripes about his tenure in the group, and by the time Sweetheart of the Rodeo was released in August 1968, Parsons had already moved on to form The Flying Burrito Brothers.

While compiling material for a 2001 Parsons anthology, the lost track "Knee Deep in the Blues" (originally a single by Marty Robbins in 1957) from the Safe at Home sessions was re-discovered and issued on that anthology, as well as on the 2004 compact disc re-release of Safe at Home (the original mid-1980s CD pressing having been on the tiny Shiloh Records).

== Reception and legacy ==
Reviews of Safe at Home have been generally positive. Upon its 1968 release, renowned music journalist Robert Christgau seemed pleasantly surprised by the notion of "four smiling longhairs" playing skillful country music, referring to the album as "a good record and a brilliant conception." Parsons' future Byrds and Flying Burrito Brothers' bandmate Chris Hillman referred to the album as "sort of fluff now. It's light weight. Gram had not quite developed into the soulful guy he was going to be." Hit Parader magazine gave the album high marks for daring to tackle country music, an area that most contemporary American groups wouldn't touch in the liberal heyday of the late 1960s.

Writer Pete Johnson of the Los Angeles Times described the album as authentic, noting a "vitality not always found in traditional country performers". Rock journalist John Einarson wrote in his 2008 book Hot Burritos: The True Story of The Flying Burrito Brothers that the album is "hardly the cutting-edge country-rock classic it is often claimed to be, nor is it groundbreaking", though he also noted a sincerity to the band's approach which preserves the spirit of the country & western genre.

"Blue Eyes", the album's opening track, was covered in 1993 by American alternative country pioneers Uncle Tupelo. It saw release on the Conmemorativo: A Tribute to Gram Parsons compilation album. Parsons himself re-recorded "Do You Know How It Feels to Be Lonesome" (with the title shortened to "Do You Know How It Feels") with The Flying Burrito Brothers on the 1969 album The Gilded Palace of Sin.

== Track listing ==
1. "Blue Eyes" (Gram Parsons) – 2:50
2. "I Must Be Somebody Else You've Known" (Merle Haggard) – 2:18
3. "A Satisfied Mind" (Joe Hayes, Jack Rhodes) – 2:31
4. "Medley: Folsom Prison Blues/That's All Right, Mama" (Johnny Cash, Arthur Crudup) – 4:25
5. "Miller's Cave" (Jack Clement) – 2:49
6. "I Still Miss Someone" (Johnny Cash, Roy Cash Jr.) – 2:47
7. "Luxury Liner" (Gram Parsons) – 2:55
8. "Strong Boy" (Gram Parsons) – 2:04
9. "Do You Know How It Feels to Be Lonesome?" (Gram Parsons, Barry Goldberg) – 3:36
10. "Knee Deep in the Blues" [*] (Melvin Endsley) – 1:55
- * bonus track on 2004 Sundazed CD & LP re-release

== Personnel ==
- Gram Parsons – lead vocal, rhythm guitar
- Bob Buchanan – rhythm guitar, harmony vocal
- Jon Corneal – drums, harmony vocal
- John Nuese – lead guitar
- Earl "Les" Ball – piano
- Chris Ethridge – bass guitar
- JayDee Maness – pedal steel guitar
- Joe Osborn – bass guitar on "Blue Eyes" and "Luxury Liner"
- Suzi Jane Hokom – producer, harmony vocal on "Do You Know How It Feels to Be Lonesome"
