= Trouble Is a Lonesome Town =

Studio album by Lee Hazlewood
- Released: January 1963
- Length: 35:17
- Language: English
- Label: Mercury
- Producer: Lee Hazlewood

Lee Hazlewood chronology
Trouble Is a Lonesome Town (1963)	The N.S.V.I.P.s (1964)

Trouble Is a Lonesome Town is the debut studio album by country pop artist Lee Hazlewood. The work is a concept album about the fictional town of Trouble and its colorful characters and was originally recorded as demos to showcase for other singers. It has received mixed reviews from critics.

== Reception ==
Editors at AllMusic rated this album 3.5 out of 5 stars, with critic Stanton Swihart writing that it is "a perfectly legitimate effort in its own right and characteristically wonderful Hazlewood" and not just a showcase of Hazelwood's songwriting capability meant for other singers. In The Austin Chronicle, Margaret Moser reviewed Hazelwood's first three albums and rated them all 1 star, writing that they "are not particularly good" and continued that this album is "by turns moody and humorous, [but] it's also contrived in retrospect, and you kinda start wishing he'd either break into Jeff Foxworthy or Ray Stevens and get it over with". Matthew Fiander of PopMatters scored this release a 7 out of 10, calling the music "the kind of storytelling that’s full of clever lines and memorable characters" making for "a nearly perfect batch of songs" where "Hazlewood injects it with enough dark humor and brief moments of hope and absurdity... that things never get too bleak".

== Track listing ==
All songs written by Lee Hazlewood.

1. "Long Black Train" – 3:39
2. "Ugly Brown" – 4:43
3. "Son of a Gun" – 3:45
4. "We All Make the Flowers Grow" – 3:02
5. "Run Boy Run" – 2:55
6. "Six Feet of Chain" – 3:14
7. "The Railroad" – 2:29
8. "Look at That Woman" – 4:04
9. "Peculiar Guy" – 3:04
10. "Trouble Is a Lonesome Town" – 4:22

== Personnel ==
- Lee Hazlewood – narration, instrumentation, production
- Chuck Britz – sound design
- Murray Garrett – artwork
- Jim Malloy – sound design
- Billy Strange – guitar
- Jack Tracy – liner notes, supervision

== Thriftstore Masterpiece Presents Lee Hazlewood's Trouble Is a Lonesome Town ==
Thriftstore Masterpiece Presents Lee Hazlewood's Trouble Is A Lonesome Town is a 2013 various artists tribute album that features re-recordings of Trouble Is a Lonesome Town from contemporary artists. Devised by producer Charles Normal and released by SideOneDummy, the compilation features a variety of Americana styles. He began work on the album in 2007 and recorded artists at Magnetic Real Studio and Wavelength Studios, but the work was interrupted by the death of his brother Larry Norman and would not be completed until years later, at the behest of Isaac Brock.

In American Songwriter, Christopher Treacy gave this release 3 out of 5 stars, recommending it to "those that enjoy some camp in their twang". Hannah Phillips of DIY rated it 3 out of 5 stars, characterizing it as "a ramshackle collection that sometimes distracts from the storytelling itself".

1. "Long Black Train" – 4:28
2. "Ugly Brown" – 4:35
3. "Son of a Gun" – 4:31
4. "We All Make the Flowers Grow" – 4:37
5. "Run Boy Run" – 3:47
6. "Six Feet of Chain" – 4:11
7. "The Railroad" – 3:42
8. "Look at That Woman" – 5:54
9. "Peculiar Guy" – 4:18
10. "Trouble Is a Lonesome Town" – 4:12

"Long Black Train"

- Frank Black – vocals
- Jason Carter – drums, percussion, drum recording, mixing
- Scott Gerweck – trupmet
- Charles Normal – guitar, bass guitar, keyboards
- William Slater – piano

"Ugly Brown"

- T. Ryan Albanese – trombone
- Jason Carter – drums, drum recording, mixing
- Scott Gerweck – trumpet
- Charles Normal – guitar, mandolin, synthesizer
- Larry Norman – vocals
- Dizzy Reed – piano
- William Slater – piano
- Silver Sorensen – upright bass
- Jake Wigfield-Gorka – tenor saxophone

"Son of a Gun"

- Frank Black – vocals
- Jason Carter – drums, percussion, drum recording, mixing
- Julian Clark – vocals
- Charles Normal – guitar, keyboards, backing vocals
- Silver Sorensen – upright bass

"We All Make The Flowers Grow"

- Kristin Blix – vocals
- Jason Carter – percussion, drum recording
- Scott Gerweck – trumpet
- Mike Manning – musical saw introduction
- Charles Normal – guitar, backing vocals, mixing
- William Slater – piano
- Silver Sorensen – upright bass

"Run Boy Run"

- Frank Black – vocals
- Kristin Blix – harmony vocals
- Jason Carter – drums, drum recording, mixing
- Charles Normal – guitar, backing vocals
- Jesse Ruggles – guitar
- William Slater – piano
- Silver Sorensen – bass guitar

"Six Feet of Chain"

- Kristin Blix – harmony vocals
- Jason Carter – drums, drum recording, mixing
- Charles Normal – guitar, bass guitar, banjo, mandolin, whistle, chain sounds
- R. Walt Vincent – engineering
- Pete Yorn – vocals

"The Railroad"

- Isaac Brock – vocals
- Jason Carter – drums, drum recording, mixing
- Scott Gerweck – trumpet
- Clay Jones – engineering
- Charles Normal – glockenspiel, sampler
- William Slater – piano
- Silver Sorensen – upright bass
- Dr. Gregory Alan Thornbury – guitar

"Look at That Woman"

- Jason Carter – drums, drum recording, mixing
- Troy Engle – violin
- Fathead – backing vocals
- Scott Gerweck – trumpet
- Count Kellam – engineering
- Charles Normal – guitar, bass guitar, sampler, cello, percussion
- William Slater – piano
- Courtney Taylor-Taylor – vocals

"Peculiar Guy"

- Eddie Argos – vocals
- Jason Carter – drums, drum recording, mixing
- Charles Normal – guitar, bass guitar, sounds
- Dyan Valdés – incredulous interlude vocals

"Trouble Is a Lonesome Town"

- Jason Carter – drums, percussion, drum recording
- Scott Gerweck – trumpet
- Charles Normal – guitar, mandolin, strings, mixing
- Larry Norman – vocals
- William Slater – piano
- Silver Sorensen – upright bass

Technical personnel

- Jerry "The Mailman" Albertini – narration
- Kristin Blix – painting
- Jason Carter – mastering at Atomic Disc
- Charles Normal – narration music, arrangement, engineering, production, layout, design
- Maxwell Stern – layout, design

== See also ==
- List of 1963 albums
