= Poet, Fool or Bum =

Studio album by Lee Hazlewood
- Released: 1973
- Genre: Country pop
- Length: 30:09
- Label: Capitol
- Producer: Jimmy Bowen

Lee Hazlewood chronology
I'll Be Your Baby Tonight (1973)	Poet, Fool or Bum (1973)	A House Safe for Tigers (1975)

Poet, Fool or Bum is a studio album by Lee Hazlewood, released in 1973.

== Critical reception ==
Professional ratings
Review scores
Source	Rating
AllMusic	3/5 stars
Uncut	3/10

John Bush of AllMusic gave the album 3 stars out of 5, saying: "Poet, Fool or Bum caught Lee Hazlewood in a sentimental, chagrined mode that didn't compare well to his earlier hard-bitten material."

The NME described the album in one word, "Bum".

== Track listing ==
No.	Title	Writer(s)	Length
1.	"Poet, Fool or Bum"	Lee Hazlewood	3:22
2.	"Heaven Is My Woman's Love"	S. K. Dobbins	2:58
3.	"Kari"	Hazlewood	2:20
4.	"Feathers"	Hazlewood	2:21
5.	"Nancy and Me"	Hazlewood	4:31
6.	"Performer"	Hazlewood	3:00
7.	"Come Spend the Morning"	Leonard Cohen, Bob Johnston	2:56
8.	"Wind, Sky, Sea and Sand"	Hazlewood	2:14
9.	"Think I'm Coming Down"	Hazlewood	2:35
10.	"Those Were Days of Roses (Martha)"	Tom Waits	3:52

== Personnel ==
Credits adapted from liner notes.

- Larry Muhoberac – arrangement (1, 4, 5, 6, 9)
- Ernie Freeman – arrangement (2, 3, 7, 8, 10)
- Jimmy Bowen – production
- Rod Dyer, Inc. – design
- Leandro Correa – photography
