= Cowboy in Sweden =

Soundtrack album by Lee Hazlewood
- Released: September 1970
- Genre: Country
- Length: 31:15
- Label: LHI
- Producers: Lee Hazlewood, David Anderle

Lee Hazlewood chronology
Forty (1969)	Cowboy in Sweden (1970)	Requiem for an Almost Lady (1971)

Cowboy in Sweden is the soundtrack album to the 1970 television special of the same name starring Lee Hazlewood, released in 1970. In 2016, the album was reissued by Light in the Attic Records with additional bonus tracks.

== Critical reception ==
Professional ratings
Review scores
Source	Rating
AllMusic	4/5 stars
Flood Magazine	8/10
Spectrum Culture	3/5
Uncut	8/10

Stephen Thomas Erlewine of AllMusic gave the album 4 stars out of 5, saying: "At its core, it's a collection of country and cowboy tunes, much like the work he did with Nancy Sinatra, but the production is cinematic and psychedelic, creating a druggy, discombobulated sound like no other."

== Track listing ==
No.	Title	Writer(s)	Length
1.	"Pray Them Bars Away"	Lee Hazlewood	2:37
2.	"Leather & Lace"	Hazlewood	3:02
3.	"Forget Marie"	Hazlewood	1:59
4.	"Cold Hard Times"	Hazlewood	2:22
5.	"The Night Before"	Len Moseley	3:12
6.	"Hey Cowboy"	Hazlewood	3:17
7.	"No Train to Stockholm"	Hazlewood	2:17
8.	"For a Day Like Today"	Hazlewood	3:58
9.	"Easy and Me"	Hazlewood	2:47
10.	"What's More I Don't Need Her"	Guy Fletcher, Doug Flett	3:29
11.	"Vem Kan Segla"	Traditional, Hazlewood	2:15

2016 reissue edition bonus tracks
No.	Title	Length
12.	"Me and the Wine and the City Lights"	2:21
13.	"Easy and Me" (Alternate version)	2:47
14.	"Pray Them Bars Away" (Alternate version)	2:10

== Personnel ==
Credits adapted from liner notes.

- Lee Hazlewood – vocals, arrangement, production
- Nina Lizell – vocals (2, 6, 11)
- Suzi Jane Hokom – vocals (8)
- Johnny Arthy – arrangement
- Craig Doerge – arrangement
- Clark Gassman – arrangement
- Lars Samuelsson – arrangement
- David Whitaker – arrangement
- David Anderle – production (7)
- Larry Marks – associate production
- Donnie Owens – associate production
- Jack Robinson – associate production
- Shel Talmy – associate production
- Mickey Crofford – engineering
- Eddie Brackett – engineering
