= Cake or Death (Lee Hazlewood album) =

Studio album by Lee Hazlewood
- Released: November 27, 2006
- Genre: Pop
- Length: 40:36
- Label: BPX1992
- Producer: Lee Hazlewood, Richard Barron, Al Casey, Duane Eddy, Lasse Samuelsson, Jeane Kelley-Hazlewood

Lee Hazlewood chronology
For Every Solution There's a Problem (2002)	Cake or Death (2006)

Cake or Death is the final studio album by Lee Hazlewood, released in 2006. The title of the album is a reference to a stand-up comedy routine by the British comedian Eddie Izzard, of whom Hazlewood was a fan.

== Personnel ==
For his final album, Hazlewood opted to work with lower-profile performers rather than his usual roster of collaborators such as Nancy Sinatra or Ann-Margret. "Please Come to Boston" features Swedish singer Ann-Kristin Hedmark. "She's Gonna Break Some Heart Tonight" was performed solely by Hazlewood's friend Tommy Parsons, with Hazlewood introducing Parsons at the beginning of the track. “The First Song of the Day” was written by German musician Dirk Felsenheimer, better known by his stage name Bela B. The track was also featured on Bela B's album Bingo as “Lee Hazlewood & das erste Lied des Tages.” Finally, Hazlewood includes a new version of "Some Velvet Morning", sung with his granddaughter Phaedra Dawn Stewart (whose namesake is prominently mentioned in the song).

== Critical reception ==
Professional ratings
Review scores
Source	Rating
AllMusic	3/5 stars
Entertainment Weekly	A−
The Guardian	3/5 stars
Pitchfork	7.7/10

Stephen Troussé of Pitchfork gave the album a 7.7 out of 10, saying: "sobriety has never been Hazlewood's style, and Cake or Death is as daffy, cornball and absurdly touching as anything he's put his name to over the last half century." John Bush of AllMusic gave the album 3 stars out of 5, saying: "In sound and execution, Cake or Death is a modern-day roots rock record (with the polished touch of Nashville), and Hazlewood's studio team finds no trouble moving from loping (Western) swing to red-hot rock & roll."

== Track listing ==
No.	Title	Lyrics	Music	Length
1.	"Nothing"	Lee Hazlewood, Claudia Stülpner	Lee Hazlewood, Claudia Stülpner	3:09
2.	"Baghdad Knights"	Hazlewood	Hazlewood	3:34
3.	"Please Come to Boston"	Dave Loggins	Dave Loggins	4:28
4.	"She's Gonna Break Some Heart Tonight"	Hazlewood	Hazlewood, Tommy Parsons	3:09
5.	"Sacrifice"	Hazlewood	Hazlewood, Parsons	2:36
6.	"Fred Freud"	Hazlewood	Hazlewood	3:01
7.	"The First Song of the Day"	Dirk Felsenheimer	Claus Quidde, Michael O'Ryan	3:14
8.	"It's Nothing to Me"	Pat Paterson	Pat Paterson	3:35
9.	"Anthem"	Hazlewood	Hazlewood	2:26
10.	"White People Thing"	Hazlewood	Al Casey	1:50
11.	"Boots" (Original melody)	Hazlewood	Hazlewood	5:07
12.	"Some Velvet Morning"	Hazlewood	Hazlewood	1:35
13.	"T.O.M. (The Old Man)"	Hazlewood	Casey	2:52
