= Inga Liljeström =

Australian musician

Inga Liljeström is an Australian experimental vocalist, composer, producer and performer Her musical style crosses genres including electronic, rock, folk, country, and avant garde. She also works with film and collage.

== Early life and education ==
Born in Australia of a Scandinavian-born father and an English-born mother, she grew up in Bellingen on the north coast of New South Wales. At the age of ten, she and her family joined an alternative religious community in which music played an important role. Then she discovered a passion for singing. She studied jazz vocals and improvisation at Southern Cross University. During her studies, her work revolved around the jazz singers Billie Holiday, Sarah Vaughan, Nina Simone and Nancy Wilson. At the same time, she also learned the Yoik song from Lapland and studied Spanish-influenced music. She is currently completing a PhD at the University of New England, New South Wales.

== Career ==
After graduation, she moved to Sydney where she began composing her own songs accompanied by Felicity Wilcox with whom she set up an experimental punk-rock band, Helgrind. During this time, she also received a government grant from the Council of the Arts through which she recorded and self-produced her first solo album, Urchin. She has released five albums commercially and one self-released. She has worked both in Australia and overseas in Europe as a recording artist and performer of her own music. She is currently signed to world music label Accord Croises in France.

In 2009 she relocated to Paris and recorded 'Black Crow Jane', which resulted in a publishing and record deal with Emergence Music. She contributed her compositions and voice to films and television programs including feature 'Left Ear' by Andrew Wholley and ABC's Rake series.

She taught university students in Europe and Australia as part of residency programs, creating multi-media shows with art, music and film students.

She has performed and toured as guest singer with groups including jazz experimental group 'd.i.g' (Directions in Groove) for their album Curveystrasse and with Australian group The Church, for their album El Momento Siguiente. She also made vocal contributions to "Dust Me Selecta" by Gerling which became a hit song and remixed Gotye's Mixed Blood. She collaborated with composer Yantra de Vilder, Bob Scott and The Zion Band.

In 2025 she appeared with The Dust Revival Band in Victoria, Australia.

== Discography ==
- Urchin (Self Released 1998)
- Elk (Groovescooter Records 2005)
- Sprawling Fawns (Groovescooter /da dAdA 2006)
- Quiet Music for Quiet People (Vitamin Records 2006)
- Radjur - DVD (Groovescooter /da dAdA 2008)
- Urchin 2010 (Groovescooter /da dAdA 2010) [reissue]
- Black Crow Jane (Emergent/Groovescooter Records 2011)
- Songs of sorrow for the hollow of his Hhart (Groovescooter Records 2012–13)
- Two dangers (Groovescooter Records 2014)
- We have tigers (Accords Croisés 2015) with Michael Lira
