= International Submarine Band =

American country rock band (1965–1968)

The International Submarine Band
- Genres: Country rock
- Years active: 1965–1968
- Label: LHI
- Past members: Gram Parsons; John Nuese; Ian Dunlop; Mickey Gauvin; Jon Corneal; Bob Buchanan; Joe Osborn; Earl Ball; JayDee Maness; Chris Ethridge

The International Submarine Band (ISB) was a country-rock band formed by Gram Parsons in 1965, while a theology student at Harvard University and John Nuese, a guitar player for local rock group, The Trolls. Nuese is credited with having persuaded Parsons to pursue the country-rock sound for which he would later be remembered. Parsons' work with the band predates his better known ventures with The Byrds, the Flying Burrito Brothers, and the Fallen Angels with Emmylou Harris.

== History ==
=== The Like: 1965 ===
In 1965, Parsons enrolled at Harvard University to study theology. Never a serious student, Parsons immediately set about establishing himself as a presence on the local folk music scene. Parsons' first band, which he named The Like, featured only Parsons and students from the Berklee College of Music. Given that Parsons was interested in pursuing a career as a folksinger at this time, his bandmates' jazz training proved incompatible with Parsons's musical aspirations. The group disbanded late in 1965, when Parsons met John Nuese, a guitarist with another local group called the Trolls, who convinced the singer to pursue an explicit country rock sound.

=== ISB version 1: 1965-1966 ===
According to Nuese: "I was the only one with experience playing and listening to a lot of country music. Gram, who had been exposed to country music during his formative years, was doing commercial folk music. It was my influence that turned him on to country music." Sufficiently impressed with what he heard, and more interested in "chasing tail and dropping LSD" than completing his degree, Parsons dropped out of Harvard before his first semester was over. Immediately, Parsons and Nuese formed "The International Submarine Band", named after an old Our Gang comedy short (Mike Fright, 1934) in which kids auditioned for a radio program as "The International Silver String Submarine Band." Featuring Parsons on guitar and vocals, Ian Dunlop on bass and Mickey Gauvin on drums, the ISB failed to make a lasting impression on either the Top 40 Pop or Country charts with any of their recordings.

In early 1966, the ISB moved to New York City, where they lived in a house purchased through Parsons' large trust fund. While in New York, the ISB recorded two singles for Goldstar Records, and an album which went unreleased and was eventually lost. The group's first release, a single in April 1966 called "The Russians Are Coming, The Russians Are Coming", was a largely forgettable cover of Johnny Mandel's tune of the same name, composed for the eponymous Norman Jewison film. On the B-side was the group's cover of Terry Fell's "Truck Driving Man". Later that same year, Goldstar released another single, featuring "Sum Up Broke" — a collaborative effort between Parsons (lyrics) and Nuese (music) — on the A-side, and Parsons' "One Day Week" on the flip side.

Undaunted by his failure to achieve overnight commercial success with the ISB, Parsons began to consider moving the group to Los Angeles, spurred on by former child actor Brandon deWilde's promise that he could get the group appearances in films. In November, Parsons headed out to Los Angeles' Laurel Canyon district on a scouting trip; while there, he stole Nancy Ross away from David Crosby, and began a torrid love affair with the aspiring film star. After Ross promised to find Parsons and the ISB official representation in Los Angeles, Parsons convinced the group to move there later in the year. As was his custom, Parsons used his trust fund money to purchase a house for his band, while he stayed in a rented apartment with Ross. Introduced by deWilde to Peter Fonda, Parsons convinced Fonda to advocate a cameo for the ISB on Roger Corman's psychedelic film, The Trip, in which Fonda was starring at the time. The ISB recorded "Lazy Days" for the film, but the song was eventually rejected; it was replaced with music by The Electric Flag, though the ISB still appeared on screen.

Frustrated by his inability to find commercial success with the ISB, Parsons soon took to playing honky-tonks in the Los Angeles area with his friend, Bob Buchanan (co-author of "Hickory Wind"), and eventually decided to focus exclusively on country music. Almost immediately after Parsons informed them of his new country focus, Ian Dunlop and Mickey Gauvin left the ISB, forming a group called The Flying Burrito Brothers (not to be confused with the later country rock band of the same name, featuring Parsons and Chris Hillman among others). The split was amicable: Parsons played the group's first gig.

=== ISB version 2: 1967-1968 ===
Only days before the ISB officially split, Suzi Jane Hokom, a would-be record producer from the area, observed a rehearsal. Impressed, Hokom convinced her boyfriend, Lee Hazlewood, owner of LHI Records, to sign the post-breakup Parsons and Nuese to an exclusive contract as the ISB. Immediately, Parsons and Nuese began their search for musicians to complete the band. Jon Corneal, a drummer from an earlier Parsons band, answered the call, though he was making a good living playing as a session musician in Nashville. Three session musicians were hired to augment the threesome: Joe Osborn on bass, Earl Ball on piano and JayDee Maness on pedal steel.

The newly re-formed International Submarine Band recorded their first single in July 1967, under the watchful gaze of producer Hokom: two Parsons compositions, "Luxury Liner" and "Blue Eyes". Four months later, in November 1967, the same group, plus newcomer Chris Ethridge on bass, entered the studio to record what would become the band's only full-length album release, Safe at Home. Two more Parsons originals made the album: "Do You Know How It Feels To Be Lonesome" and "Strong Boy".

=== Parsons becomes a Byrd: the ISB's demise, 1968 ===
Though Safe at Home was finished by December 1967, the ISB's debut LP went unreleased for several months. Parsons left the group in February 1968, to join The Byrds to record their Sweetheart of the Rodeo album. Lee Hazlewood was unhappy with Parsons' decision and retained ownership of the name "International Submarine Band". Hazlewood attempted to prevent Parsons' vocal tracks from appearing on the Sweetheart of the Rodeo album. Although these legal issues were gone by the time of the album's release, Parsons vocals were removed from several songs and replaced by vocals by Roger McGuinn; ultimately Parsons sang lead on four songs: "You're Still on My Mind," "Life in Prison," "One Hundred Years From Now," and "Hickory Wind." The ISB's only full-length album, Safe at Home was not released by LHI until the spring of 1968, by which time the group had officially ceased to exist. In 1979, the album was repackaged, redesigned, and re-released under the title "Gram Parsons" by Shiloh Records of San Clemente, California.

== Discography ==
=== Albums ===
- Safe at Home - 1968 - LHI Records
- The Devil and the Deep Blue Sea - sine anno - Ze Anonym Plattenspieler

==== Reunion album ====
- Back at Home - 2000 - Yellow Label

=== Singles ===
- "The Russians Are Coming! The Russians Are Coming!" // "Truck Driving Man" - June 1966 - Ascot Records
- "Sum Up Broke" // "One Day Week" - November 1966 - Columbia Records
- "Luxury Liner" // "Blue Eyes" - February 1968 - LHI Records
- "I Must Be Somebody Else You've Known" // "Miller's Cave" - October 1968 - LHI Records

=== EP ===
- Blue Eyes / Luxury Liner / Miller's Cave / I Must Be Somebody Else You've Known - 2008 - Sundazed Music
