= This Town (Frank Sinatra song) =

Song by Nancy Sinatra & Lee Hazlewood

from the album Movin' with Nancy (soundtrack)
- Language: English
- Published: 1967
- Released: 1968
- Recorded: 1967
- Length: 2:59
- Label: Reprise
- Songwriter(s): Lee Hazlewood
- Producer(s): Bob Gaudio

"This Town" is a song written by Lee Hazlewood and recorded by Frank Sinatra in 1967. The song was first seen on Sinatra's 1967 album The World We Knew.

== Chart performance ==
It reached number 53 on the U.S. Billboard Hot 100 and number 17 on the Easy Listening chart. "This Town" peaked at number 41 on Cash Box during the fall of that year.

== Later uses ==
- "This Town" was included in Sinatra's 1968 Greatest Hits album.

== Cover versions ==
- The Tubes covered the song on their 1977 album, Now.

== Popular culture ==
- The song was featured in the 1967 television special, Movin' with Nancy, which starred Nancy Sinatra. A special version was released to home video in 2000.
- "This Town" was used in films such as The Cool Ones, Matchstick Men, Ocean's Thirteen, From Paris With Love, and The Bounty Hunter.
- "This Town" was also used as a partial sound clip in the 2016 The Simpsons episode "Trust but Clarify".
- Paul Shaffer re-worked lyrics to the song for his intro and closing theme of the regular “Small Town News” segment on The Late Show with David Letterman.
