= LHI Records =

American record label

- Founded: 1960s
- Founder: Lee Hazlewood
- Country of origin: United States

LHI Records was an American record label founded by Lee Hazlewood. LHI stood for Lee Hazlewood Industries. The label was first distributed by Decca Records then by ABC Records (both labels were eventually absorbed by MCA Records). By 1969, LHI was distributed independently with tape distribution by Ampex. The label lasted until 1971.

== Notable releases ==
- In 1966 Donnie Owens was named executive producer of the LHI country product. Their first single was "Crying Shade" and "Out of My Hands" by Virgil Warner.
- In 1967 they released an album by garage rock band The Kitchen Cinq. In total one album and four singles of the group were released during 1967. The label issued a cameo single release of the group under the name A Handful.
- The 1967 album Lee Hazlewood Presents The 98% American Mom & Apple Pie 1929 Crash Band consisted of honky-tonk instrumental versions of highly commercial successful songs and compositions from Lee Hazlewood from the period 1965–1967.
- Country singer Sanford Clark covered Hazlewood's composition Houston in 1964. The two singles releases on the label The Black Widow b/w The Son of Hickory Holler's Tramp in 1967, and Farm Labor Camp #2 were followed by the album Return of The Fool in 1968. These would be his last released recordings.
- In 1967, The International Submarine Band recorded Safe At Home for the label, which some consider to be the first country rock album. Its release was in 1968, including the releasing of two singles spinning off.
- In 1968, US girl group Honey Ltd. released their debut album on LHI. Another album and five singles releases followed until 1970. After getting a second chance under the name Eve, releasing an album and two singles, Hazlewood dropped the group.
- Hazlewood revived The Shacklefords in 1967 and recorded, being a member, three singles with them.
- Hazlewood's then girlfriend Suzi Jane Hokom continued her services as demo-singer and assistant record producer, incidentally releasing records, some being duets.
- In 1967, Hazlewood signed Mike Condello's band, named them Last Friday's Fire, and released three singles with them.
- Swedish-American actress and singer Ann-Margret released one album, three solo singles and two duets with Hazlewood in 1969.
- In 1969 and 1970 Barbara Randolph issued two singles: "Woman To That Man" and "Miracle On 19th Street", but both never got beyond the status of promotional recordings. After that it lasted until 1979 for her to record again, for Tamla Motown.
- In a last attempt to revive their career The Surprise Package recorded an album Free Up in 1968, which spun off the title track as well as their version of the song "MacArthur Park" as singles releases during 1969.
- Other releases included works from artists such as Malibu's Kazoos, Buddy Long, Danny Michaels, Virgil Warner, Billie Dearborn, Michael Gram, Hamilton Streetcar, The Aggregation, Arthur Lee Harper, Lynn Castle, Linda Owens, Bob Kaufmann, Phoenix 70, Barney Carl, Ray Chafin, Jon Christian, Raul Danks and Jon Taylor.
- In 2012, the double album The LHI Years: Singles, Nudes & Backsides (1968–71), containing rarities (B-sides, demos etc.) from the label's historical shelves, was released on the Light In The Attic label.

== See also ==
- List of record labels
