= Lee Hazlewood =

American country and pop songwriter (1929–2007)

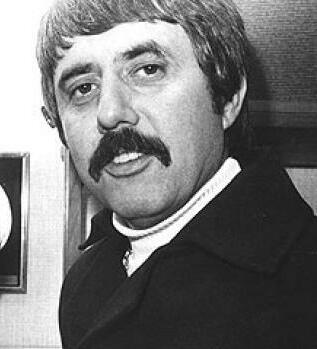
- Hazlewood in 1968

Background information
- Born: Barton Lee Hazlewood; July 9, 1929; Mannford, Oklahoma, U.S.
- Died: August 4, 2007 (aged 78) Henderson, Nevada, U.S.
- Genres: Country; pop; psychedelia
- Occupations: Singer; songwriter; record producer
- Instrument: Guitar
- Years active: 1958–2006

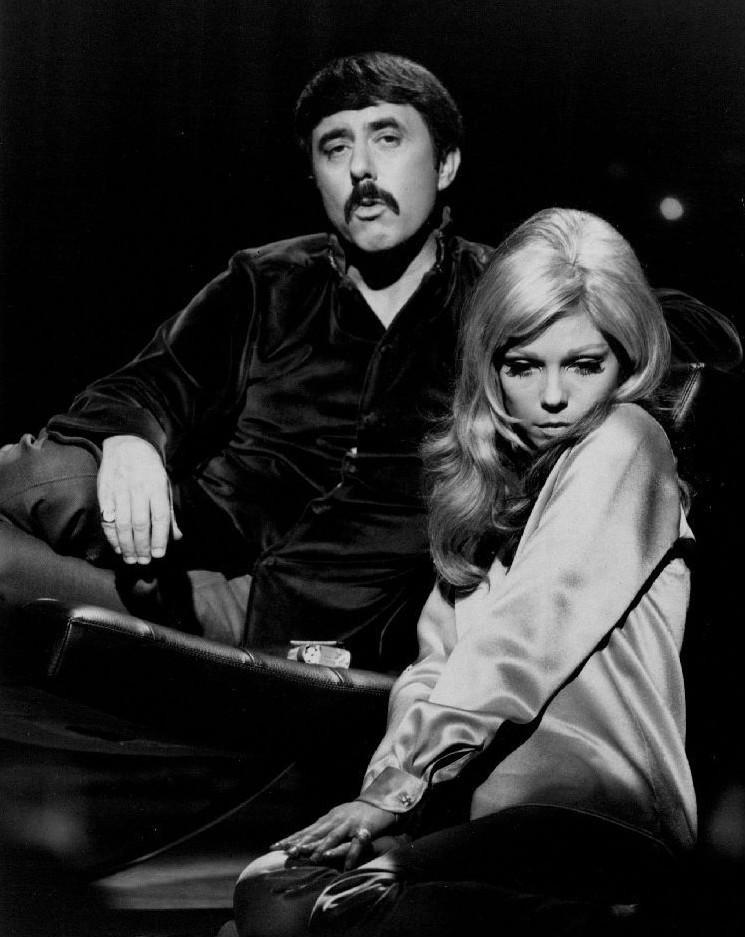
Lee Hazlewood and Nancy Sinatra on The Hollywood Palace, 1968

Barton Lee Hazlewood (July 9, 1929 – August 4, 2007) was an American country and pop singer, songwriter, and record producer, most widely known for his work with guitarist Duane Eddy during the late 1950s and singer Nancy Sinatra in the 1960s and 1970s. His collaborations with Sinatra and his solo output in the late 1960s and early 1970s have been praised as an essential contribution to a sound often described as "cowboy psychedelia" or "saccharine underground". Rolling Stone ranked Lee Hazlewood and Nancy Sinatra number 9 on its list of the 20 Greatest Duos of All Time.

== Early life ==
Barton Lee Hazlewood was born in Mannford, Oklahoma, on July 9, 1929. Hazlewood's father was an oil worker and had a sideline as a dance promoter; Hazlewood spent most of his youth living in Oklahoma, Arkansas, Kansas, and Louisiana. His mother was half Creek. Lee grew up listening to pop and bluegrass music. He spent his teenaged years in Port Neches, Texas, where he was exposed to a rich Gulf Coast music tradition. He studied for a medical degree at Southern Methodist University in Dallas, Texas, and served with the United States Army during the Korean War.

== Career ==
Following discharge from the military in 1953, Hazlewood did not return to his studies. He worked as a disc jockey in Coolidge, Arizona, and two years later, moved to KRUX radio in Phoenix. During that time, he was already writing songs and formed his own record label, Viv.

Hazlewood was initially known as a producer and songwriter. His first hit single as a producer and songwriter was "The Fool", recorded by rockabilly artist Sanford Clark in 1955.

He partnered with pioneering rock guitarist Duane Eddy, producing and co-writing a string of hit instrumental records. "Rebel 'Rouser", released in 1958 was a hit in the U.S. and the UK.

Hazlewood is perhaps best known for having written and produced the 1966 Nancy Sinatra U.S./UK number-one hit "These Boots Are Made for Walkin'" and "Summer Wine", the latter first recorded with Suzi Jane Hokom in 1966.

His collaboration with Nancy Sinatra began when Frank Sinatra asked Lee to help guide his daughter's career. When recording "These Boots are Made for Walkin'", Hazlewood suggested to Nancy Sinatra, "you can't sing like Nancy Nice Lady any more. You have to sing for the truckers". She later described him as "part Henry Higgins and part Sigmund Freud".

Hazlewood also wrote "How Does That Grab Ya, Darlin'", "Friday's Child", "So Long, Babe", "Sugar Town", and many others for Nancy Sinatra. Among his most well-known vocal performances is "Some Velvet Morning", a 1967 duet with Sinatra. He performed that song along with "Jackson" on her 1967 television special Movin' With Nancy. Early in 1967, Lee produced the number-one hit song for Frank and Nancy Sinatra, "Somethin' Stupid". The pair became the only father-daughter duo to top the Hot 100. The record earned a Grammy Award nomination for Record of the Year and remains the only father-daughter duet to hit number one in the U.S.

Hazlewood wrote "The Last of the Secret Agents", the theme song of the 1966 spy-spoof film of the same title. Nancy Sinatra, who had a role in the film, recorded the song for the soundtrack. For Frank Sinatra's 1967 detective film, Tony Rome, Hazlewood wrote the theme song, which was performed by Nancy.

He wrote "Houston", a 1965 U.S. hit recorded by Dean Martin. He produced several singles for Martin's daughter, Deana Martin, including her country hit, "Girl of the Month Club", while Deana was a teenager. Other tunes on that project were "When He Remembers Me", "Baby I See You". and "The Bottom of My Mind", all recorded during the 1960s.

Hazlewood wrote "This Town", a song that was recorded by Frank Sinatra that appeared on his 1968 album Greatest Hits and was the basis for Paul Shaffer's "Small Town News" segment theme on the Late Show with David Letterman.

In 1967, Hazlewood started his own record label, LHI Records (Lee Hazlewood Industries). Though it did not receive much attention at the time, the International Submarine Band, led by a then-unknown Gram Parsons, signed with LHI in 1967 and released their only album, Safe at Home. Shortly after the album was recorded, Parsons left the band to join the Byrds, contributing several songs to their 1968 album Sweetheart of the Rodeo. The contract Parsons had signed with Hazlewood's LHI caused a great deal of trouble for himself and the Byrds, and in the court settlement most of Parsons' material on Sweetheart of the Rodeo had the vocals removed and re-recorded by Roger McGuinn. This situation led to Parsons' departure from the Byrds not long after the album's release.

As LHI producer and Hazlewood's ex-girlfriend Suzi Jane Hokom later noted, Hazlewood was a performer and not a businessman, and his lack of business acumen figured greatly in the label's 1971 demise. He had a supporting role in the movie The Moonshine War, released in 1970 from a story by Elmore Leonard, starring Patrick McGoohan.

In the 1970s, Hazlewood moved to Stockholm, where he wrote and produced the one-hour television show Cowboy in Sweden together with friend and director Torbjörn Axelman, which also later emerged as an album.

During 10 years in Sweden, he made records and films with Axelman. According to a retrospective of his career, the move to Europe was motivated by his "tax problems", concern that his son might be drafted for the Vietnam War, and because his record label "LHI was dying anyway", so Sweden looked like the perfect escape route. Decades later, Suzi Jane Hokom made this comment about the years in Europe. "I think he knew he'd burned his bridges in LA and here was a brand new world where he had a built-in fanclub ... He really needed a new start".

Throughout the late 1970s and 1980s, Hazlewood was semiretired from the music business, but his own output also achieved a cult status in the underground rock scene, with songs recorded by artists such as Miles Kane, Primal Scream, Nick Cave, the Jesus and Mary Chain, the Ukiah Drag, Beck, Baustelle, the Tubes, Thin White Rope, Yonatan Gat, Zeena Schreck/Radio Werewolf and Slowdive.

In 2006, Hazlewood sang on Bela B.'s first solo album, Bingo, on the song "Lee Hazlewood und das erste Lied des Tages" ("Lee Hazlewood and the First Song of the Day"). He said that he loved producing and writing albums.

In 2007, Reprise/Rhino Handmade Records posthumously released Strung Out On Something New: The Reprise Recordings, a set of his work at Reprise from 1964-1968 (excluding the Nancy Sinatra recordings). The two-CD collection, totaling 55 tracks, covers three of his solo albums, as well as production work for other artists, such as Duane Eddy, Sanford Clark, Jack Nitzsche, and Dino, Desi & Billy.

Since 2012, the Light in the Attic record label reissued many Hazlewood albums, including 400 Miles From LA: 1955-1956, which became available in September 2019.

His last recording was for the vocals of Icelandic quartet Amiina's single "Hilli (At the Top of the World)".

== Personal life ==
Hazlewood was married three times. On December 5, 1949, he married his high-school sweetheart, Naomi Shackleford. The couple had two children, Debbie (b. 1954) and Mark Lee (b. 1955), before divorcing in 1969. Hazlewood used Naomi's maiden name for the Shacklefords, a short-lived vocal group he formed with Marty Cooper in early-1960s Los Angeles; Naomi herself contributed vocals to the group's recordings. In 1983, Hazlewood married Tracy Stewart, whose daughter Samantha (b. 1980) he raised as his own; that marriage also ended in divorce in 1992. In November 2006, less than a year before his death, he married Jeane Kelly, his girlfriend since 1993, in a Las Vegas drive-through ceremony. Kelly discussed her memories of Lee during an interview: "He was rude and sweet, innocent and depraved, proud and bitter. He absorbed everything he heard, saw, and read—from Port Neches to L.A. to Stockholm—and then made his own music in his own defiant way."

In 2005, Hazlewood was diagnosed with terminal renal cancer, and he undertook an extensive round of interviews and promotional activities in support of his last album, Cake or Death. Hazlewood died of renal cancer in Henderson, Nevada, on August 4, 2007, survived by his wife Jeane, son Mark, and daughters Debbie and Samantha.

Hazlewood has a granddaughter named Phaedra, a tribute to the lyrics of "Some Velvet Morning". Phaedra joined Hazlewood on his introspective version of the track "Some Velvet Morning" from his final album, Cake or Death.

== Discography ==
- 1963 – Trouble Is a Lonesome Town
- 1964 – The N.S.V.I.P.'s
- 1965 – Friday's Child
- 1966 – The Very Special World of Lee Hazlewood
- 1967 – Lee Hazlewoodism: Its Cause and Cure
- 1968 – Nancy & Lee – a collaboration with Nancy Sinatra
- 1968 – Something Special
- 1968 – Love and Other Crimes
- 1969 – The Cowboy and the Lady – a collaboration with Ann-Margret.
- 1969 – Forty
- 1970 – Cowboy in Sweden – two songs are on Forty, and one on Love and Other Crimes
- 1971 – Requiem for an Almost Lady
- 1971 – Nancy & Lee Again/Nancy & Lee - Did You Ever? – a collaboration with Nancy Sinatra
- 1972 – 13
- 1973 – I'll Be Your Baby Tonight
- 1973 – Poet, Fool or Bum
- 1974 – The Stockholm Kid Live at Berns
- 1975 – A House Safe for Tigers
- 1976 – 20th Century Lee
- 1977 – Movin' On
- 1977 – Back on the Street Again
- 1993 – Gypsies & Indians – a collaboration with Anna Hanski
- 1999 – Farmisht, Flatulence, Origami, ARF!!! & Me...
- 2002 – For Every Solution There's a Problem
- 2004 – Nancy & Lee 3 – a collaboration with Nancy Sinatra
- 2006 – Cake or Death
