= You Only Live Twice (soundtrack) =

Soundtrack album by John Barry
- Released: July 1967
- Recorded: April 1967
- Length: 34:12
- Label: United Artists Records
- Producers: John Barry; Lukas Kendall (2003 reissue)

John Barry chronology
The Wrong Box (1966)	You Only Live Twice (1967)	Boom! (1968)

Singles from You Only Live Twice
- 1. "You Only Live Twice" Released: 1967

Professional ratings
Review scores
Source	Rating
AllMusic	3/5 stars

You Only Live Twice is the 1967 soundtrack for the fifth James Bond film of the same name. It was composed by Bond veteran John Barry. At the time, this was his fourth credited Bond film. The theme song, "You Only Live Twice", was sung by Nancy Sinatra, the first non-British vocalist of the series, with music by Barry and lyrics by Leslie Bricusse. The soundtrack has previously been available in two versions on CD – the first, a straight reissue of the LP soundtrack, and the second, an expanded reissue including several previously unreleased tracks. The film soundtrack was recorded at CTS Studios, London. It debuted on the top 40 of the Billboard 200 album chart on 19 August 1967, and went up to 27.

== Alternative theme ==
An earlier version of the film You Only Live Twice's theme song, also entitled "You Only Live Twice", with a similar arrangement and lyrics but different melody (and without the distinctive cascading strings), sung by an uncredited Julie Rogers, was included in the James Bond 30th Anniversary 2-CD boxed set, cited as a "demo". Rogers never thought it was a demo, but a finished version for the film. After this version was recorded, the producers sought out Nancy Sinatra for the vocal and John Barry re-orchestrated the song to suit her range. An alternative example of the title song (also called "You Only Live Twice" and sung by Lorraine Chandler) can be found on compilations such as Rare, Collectable, and Soulful Vol. 2.

== Track listing ==
1. "You Only Live Twice (Main Title)" – Nancy Sinatra
2. "Capsule in Space"
3. "Fight at Kobe Dock – Helga"
4. "Tanaka's World"
5. "A Drop in the Ocean"
6. "The Death of Aki"
7. "Mountains and Sunsets"
8. "The Wedding"
9. "James Bond – Astronaut?"
10. "Countdown for Blofeld"
11. "Bond Averts World War Three" (Note: contains the "James Bond Theme", originally composed for the Dr. No soundtrack)
12. "You Only Live Twice (End Title)" – Nancy Sinatra
13. "James Bond in Japan"
14. "Aki, Tiger and Osato"
15. "Little Nellie"
16. "Soviet Capsule"
17. "SPECTRE and Village"
18. "James Bond – Ninja"
19. "Twice Is the Only Way to Live"

Tracks 13 to 19 were added later, as a bonus, to the complete version of the original soundtrack upon its digitally remastered CD rerelease.

"Twice Is the Only Way to Live" was the final track on the soundtrack's original UK version. It was also included on the United Artists soundtrack compilation Ten Golden Years (1968). On certain releases of the You Only Live Twice soundtrack album, the "007 Theme" is included. It is heard within the film when Little Nellie is being constructed and continues to play until three or four SPECTRE helicopters encounter James Bond (Sean Connery), at which point the music changes to the "James Bond Theme". Giving the score a Japanese flavour, John Leach played the koto in the film.

== Other Sinatra version ==
Nancy Sinatra recorded a record chart version of "You Only Live Twice" for Reprise Records that was arranged by guitarist Billy Strange who released several records of cover versions of James Bond musical themes. Lee Hazlewood felt Barry's lush instrumental backing was not suitable for a chart single. On the Reprise version, Sinatra's voice is double tracked giving not only an unusual sound but a pun on the title. The record was released with a cover of Johnny Cash and June Carter's "Jackson" performed by Nancy Sinatra and Hazlewood.

== Appearances and cover versions ==
Little Anthony & The Imperials recorded a cover version of the song for United Artists Records. It appeared on their 1967 album Movie Grabbers on the label's Veep Records subsidiary that year, and was released as a single from that album.

Soft Cell's cover of "You Only Live Twice" was the B side to their single "Soul Inside" in September 1983 from their album This Last Night in Sodom.

Propellerheads' cover of Barry's "On Her Majesty's Secret Service" with David Arnold from the 1997 album Shaken and Stirred: The David Arnold James Bond Project also incorporates, in its full 9-minute version, "Capsule in Space" as a central segue.

The theme "Kronos Unveiled" from the score of Pixar's 2004 film The Incredibles bears a close resemblance to the track "Capsule in Space" (reprised in "Soviet Capsule"), while the film's trailer had used Barry's original On Her Majesty's Secret Service theme.

The 2011 single "Bright Lights Bigger City" by CeeLo Green from the album The Lady Killer samples a part of the instrumental of "You Only Live Twice".

"You Only Live Twice" appeared at the end of the 2012 fifth season Mad Men episode "The Phantom".

== See also ==
- Outline of James Bond
