= Baron Barrymore Halpenny =

Baron Barrymore Halpenny is a commercial artist, executive editor, writer and historian of traditions and culture. Working for several publications, he is best known for his book cover illustrations for Ghost Stations for which he has also been editor for the newly released series; also known for writing 'Ways of the Wolf'.

== Early years ==
Born in Lincolnshire, England, but raised in the mountains of Abruzzo, Italy, where, as a baby, his first taste of Italian fame, was to have his picture in the EXTRA magazine as one of the beautiful babies of the week. He is the son of the British historian and author, Bruce Barrymore Halpenny and the equestrian writer, Marion Rose Halpenny.

His childhood was spent between England and Italy with a period in Malta at De La Salle College. Despite passing his 11-plus exam, instead of going to a grammar school, he went instead to his father's old school, De Aston, which in his father's day was a grammar school, but had since changed to a comprehensive.

He became involved in horse racing at an early age and is a keen horseman, . his racing silks registered at the Jockey Club are black breast, scarlet sleeves and orange cap.

== Graphic design and cartoons ==
At 52, he started to show his artistic merit by creating a special Isle of Man Douglas DC-3 first day cover for the Isle of Man Philatelic Bureau, and received regional press acclaim for this. The special cover carried a 26p stamp that was specially issued by the Isle of Man to mark the anniversary of the aircraft. Not only did he do all the graphic design work, but he was even responsible for the special handstamping of the covers. The Isle of Man was particularly interested in the anniversary because of the high volume of air mail handled by Dakotas at that time, and also the link between the names of Douglas, Isle of Man, and Douglas DC3 Dakota, which Baron cleverly showed in his hand stamp.

On leaving school he became a professional artist and photographer, but later concentrated on illustrations and cartoons. In the late 1980s, he did architecture and graphic design in Italy with Nicola di Renzo at Techno Consult and later moved more into the graphic design field before establishing himself as a commercial artist. His most notable book cover illustrations are for his father's cult books, Ghost Stations.

He is also known for his illustrations and cartoons, especially his contract bridge themed cartoons, some appearing in bridge magazines.

== Writer and editor ==
Halpenny is noted for his "ability to write about things many people take for granted", especially from his early days, where he had from his early teens been studying and writing about traditions and culture.

He is a magazine editor and also the book editor of several publications.

== Environmentalist ==
He is an environmentalist and conservationist whose advocacy for environmental causes is well known, as is his love of the countryside and animals from a young age. He is part of several causes, supporting various organisations but in particular the Wolf Preservation Foundation, of which his father is president.
