= Nottingham Racecourse =

Horse racing venue in Nottingham, England

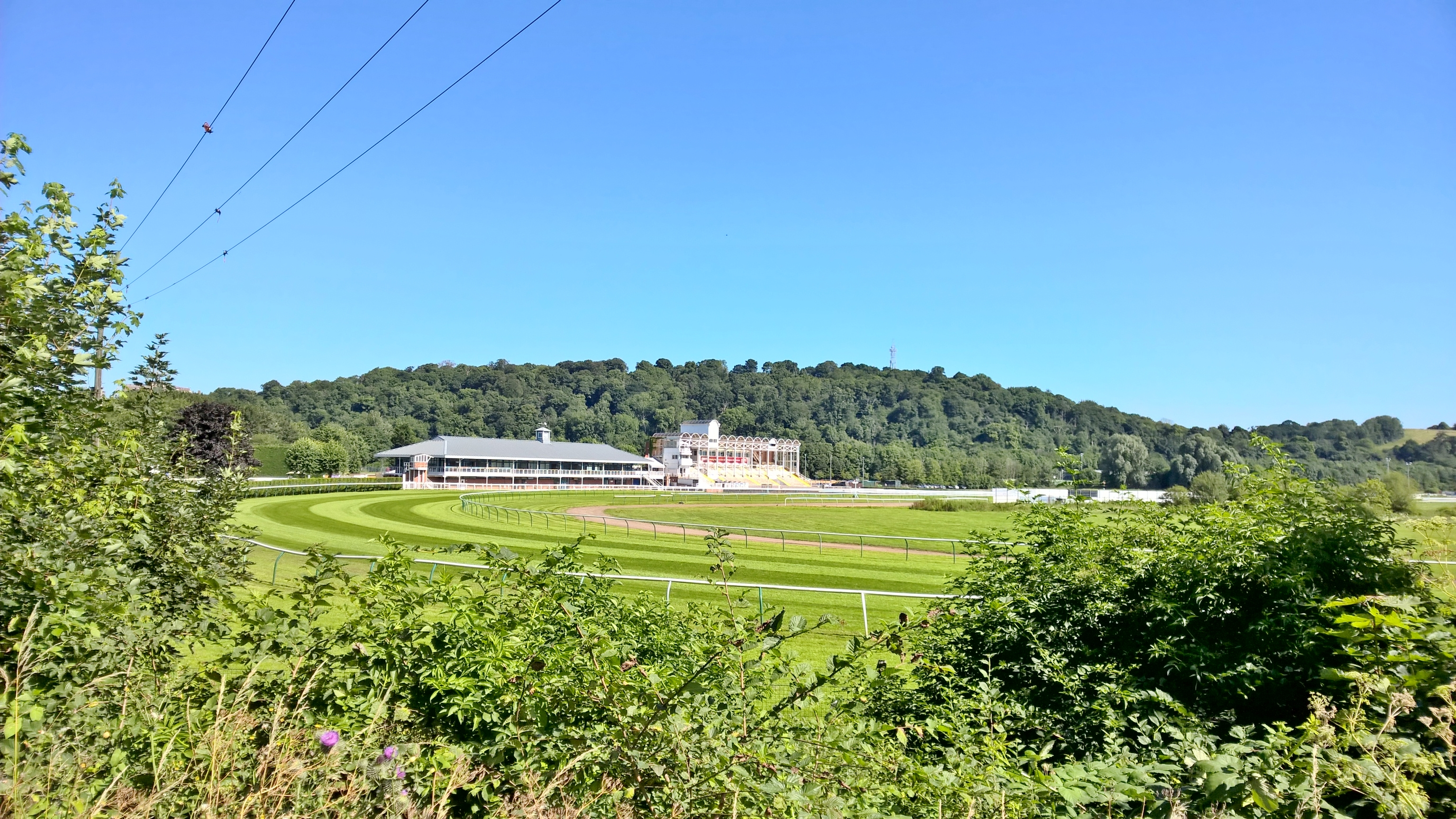
- The stands with Colwick Wood in the background
- Interactive map of Nottingham Racecourse
- Location: Nottingham, Nottinghamshire, England
- Coordinates: 52°56′53.12″N 1°06′24.51″W
- Owned by: Jockey Club Racecourses
- Date opened: 1892
- Screened on: Racing TV
- Course type: Flat

Nottingham Racecourse is a thoroughbred horse racing venue located in Nottingham, Nottinghamshire, England. It is situated at Colwick Park, close to the River Trent and about 3 km east of the city centre.

== Characteristics ==
There are actually two courses at Nottingham, one inside the other. They are both approximately 1½ miles round and are left-handed. The inner, which was the national hunt course, is used, during spring and autumn, and has a 5 furlong straight, the outer is used during summer and has a 6 furlong straight. The course generally has easy turns and minor gradients, but the home turn is fairly sharp. Nottingham suits well-balanced horses rather than long-striding ones. There was a straight mile until the 1970s.

== History ==
Nottingham races, before they moved to Colwick Park, had been held for about two hundred years on the Forest Recreation Ground, about two miles from the city centre. A course of about four miles existed on the Forest and Basford Lings. It was one of the earliest racecourses to be granted a Royal Plate race by the monarch. It was run in 4 mile heats by 6 year olds carrying 12 stone.

Early in the 18th century the circuit was reduced to two miles. An impressive grandstand, designed by John Carr of York, was built in 1777, which contained rooms for tea and cards and a large entertainment room. The roof of this stand gave 500 standing spectators a splendid view of the racing. However, parliamentary enclosures in the 1790s almost caused the demise of the course. The site was much reduced in size, resulting in the laying out of a figure-of-eight course. This was not popular as the view of the races was restricted. In 1813 a new course was designed: an oval of ten furlongs.

With the passing of the St. Mary's Nottingham Inclosure Act 1845 (8 & 9 Vict. c. 7 Pr.), the Forest and grandstand became the property of Nottingham Corporation, which appointed a committee to run the racecourse.

By the 1880s Nottingham racecourse was in decline. It was considered inadequate, being compared by one writer to a circus enclosure. There were only four days' racing each year (two days each at the Spring and Autumn meetings) catering for moderate horses as prize money was low.

At a town council meeting on 5 May 1890 a motion was put forward to urge the council to not allow betting at any race meeting under the council's management, and to abolish admission charges to the course. This was intended to bring an end to racing on the Forest. An amendment was passed to allow racing until 1 November, after which no Race Committee would be appointed.

The two race meetings took place, as usual, in 1890. The admission charges for the Autumn meeting were: Stand and First Ring 7/6d, Second Ring 5/-, New Enclosure 2/-. The most valuable race was the Nottinghamshire Handicap, with prize money of £500. It was won by Glory Smitten, with Tommy Tittlemouse second. The Autumn meeting made a profit of only £43.3s. The 'Evening Post' commented: "Amongst the residents of the town who met in the ring, speculation was rife as to whether this will be the last of the Nottingham meetings, and whether the Race Committee will be reappointed in November."

On 26 January 1891, a special meeting of the town council was held to discuss the future of horseracing on the Forest. The Nottingham Daily Express remarked that the hall was unusually full, such a large crowd generally turning up only for "mayor making". The Deputy Town Clerk opened proceedings with the news that 108 memorials (petitions) had been received against allowing the racing to continue, with 11,191 signatures. The petitioners included churches of all denominations, Arnold Pleasant Sunday Afternoon Temperance Society, Young Men's Mutual Improvement Society, Nottingham Public Morale Council. Men's Sunday Morning Institute and Morley Hall Society of Spiritualists. Mr Acton, a solicitor, commented that in no other sports were found "the same conglomeration of scum and rascality as they found connected with racing." The council voted to end racing on the Forest. The future of the grandstand had to be decided. The council tried to find a role for it, and it was offered to the Robin Hood Rifles and to someone as a residence, but it fell into disrepair and was demolished in 1910.

On 26 September 1891, the Evening Post carried an advertisement inviting applications for shares in the Nottingham and Colwick Park Racecourse and Sports Co Ltd, formed for the purpose of acquiring a 30 year lease on the Colwick Park Estate. It was proposed to construct a racecourse of one and a half miles, with a straight mile, a paddock, cycle track, tennis courts and other sports facilities. The Evening Post commented about the excellent transport access to Colwick Park, with a railway running past the course, and a steamboat landing stage near Colwick Hall. By coincidence, the Hall had been remodelled by John Carr in 1776, one year before he designed the stand for the Forest course.

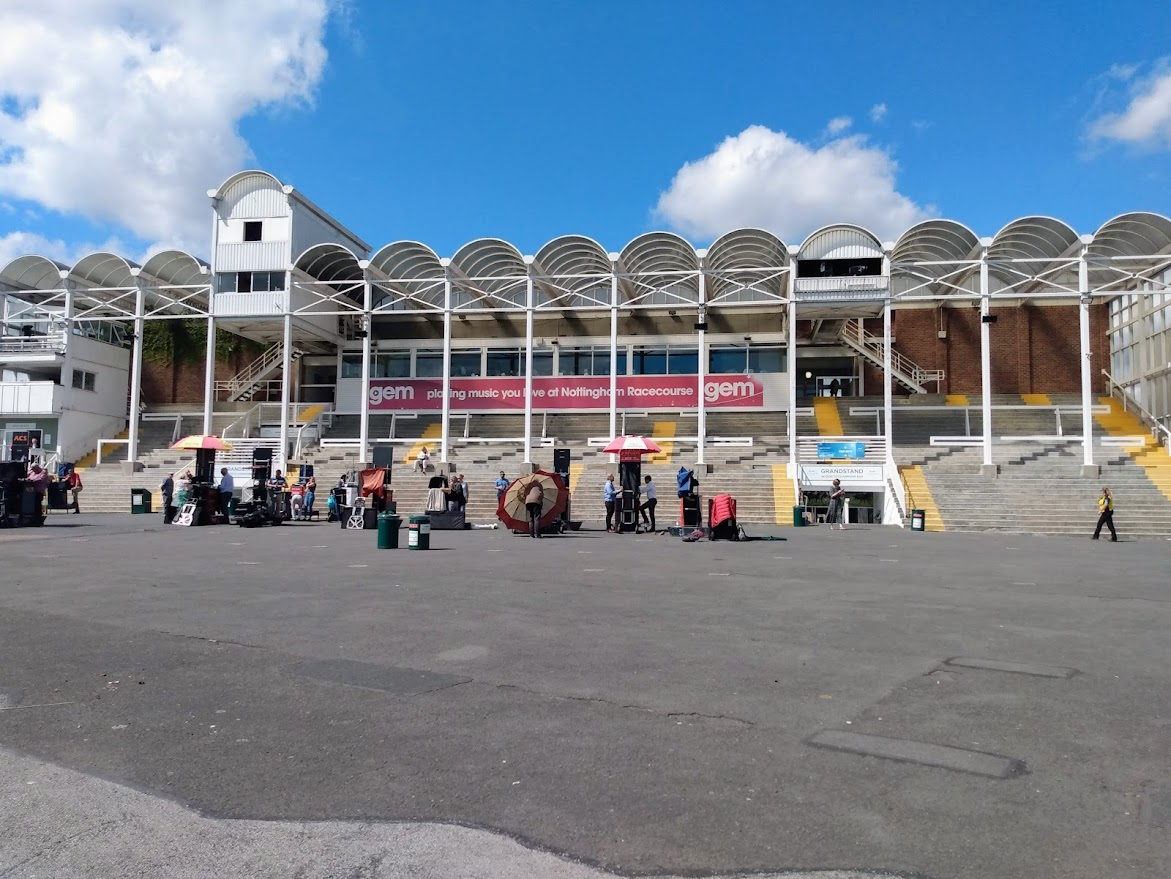
The main stand

Work on the new buildings at the course began in November 1891. All was ready by the following summer. The Evening Post reported enthusiastically about the new course, comparing it very favourably with the old course on the Forest. "In place of the small and inconvenient club stands and rings which were seen on the Forest will be found large and commodious erections for the accommodation of the club members, Tattersall's members, and the more humble votaries of racing who pay the modest half-crown for their afternoon's enjoyment. The winding course, with its peculiar and dangerous corners, has no repetition at Colwick. Here will be found that indispensable part of a racecourse, a straight mile, a mile too, which will bear comparison with the best in the country, and on the round course for flat racing, and the one for steeple-chasing, which includes a couple of natural jumps, there are such wide and sweeping bends that the inconvenience of the turns is practically reduced to a minimum."

There were two stands, one 56 yards long, the other 40 yards.

The first meeting on the new course took place on Friday 19 August 1892. The spectators included Lord Rosslyn, Lord Newark, Sir George Chetwyn, members of several county families, town councillors and the Lord Mayor and Chief Constable. The weather was sunny. A large number of racegoers came from London on a Great Northern Railway Company train from King's Cross to Colwick in 2 hours and 26 minutes. A further 25 trains stopped at the racecourse station on the first day, many starting at the Great Northern station at Nottingham Road Low Level. The second day of the meeting took place on a hot and sunny Saturday afternoon, when the main race was the Nottinghamshire Handicap, with its prize money doubled to £1,000 since its last running on the Forest. It was won by Golden Garter, with 1890's winner, Glory Smitten, second.

By the close of the 19th century the new racecourse had become established as part of Nottingham life.

In 1965 the local corporation bought the 293-acre site for £500,000, and for a short time the future of the course looked in doubt. However, the Levy Board funded improvements to the site, and the corporation agreed to lease the course to the Racecourse Holdings Trust (predecessor of Jockey Club Racecourses) for a nominal sum.

It staged both forms of racing until February 1996, after which it abandoned National Hunt racing to become a flat-only course. The racecourse was served by its own station on the Nottingham to Grantham line, from 1882 to 1959. There are still remnants of the station wall on what is now Colwick loop road.

The course hosts an early-season Listed race – the Nottinghamshire Oaks over 1 mile 2 furlongs for fillies and mares. In total, it hosted 23 race meetings in 2017, at an average of £50,467 prize money per meeting. Mr John Barnett was the courses longest serving employee; for over 25 years Mr Barnett served the course as a groundsman. On 9 June 2013, Mr Barnett's 65th birthday, he enjoyed his final raceday as a full-time employee of the racecourse, which was celebrated with a race named in his honour "Happy Retirement John Barnett handicap". The 8f race consisted of 14 runners and the winner Woody Bay trained by James Given and ridden by Graham Lee finished the race in 1m 46.78s.

== Memorable events ==
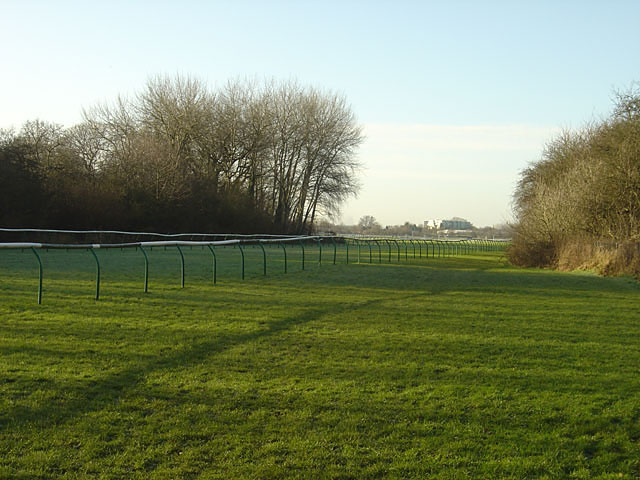
The view from the outer straight start

In April 2013, there was a triple dead-heat in a race at Nottingham, only the second time it had happened for over a decade. Horses Thorpe Bay, Majestic Manannan and My Time tied for fourth place in the Lodge Farm Stud Chris And May Mullin Handicap over 5 furlongs.

== Facts and figures ==
- Number of fixtures (2016) – 23
- Prize money (2016) – £1,160,750
- Top trainer (2007 – 2011 inc.) – Saeed Bin Suroor, 24 from 56 runs

== Notable races ==
Month	DOW	Race Name	Type	Grade	Distance	Age/Sex
April	Tuesday	Nottinghamshire Oaks	Flat	Listed	1m 2f 50y	4yo + f
October	Thursday	Robin Hood Stakes	Flat	Listed	1m 75y	3yo +

== Bibliography ==
- Halpenny, Marion Rose (1971). British Racing and Racecourses. Holmes & Sons. ISBN 9780950139722.
- Mortimer, Roger; Onslow, Richard; Willett, Peter (1978). Biographical Encyclopaedia of British Racing. London: Macdonald and Jane's. ISBN 0-354-08536-0.
- Whyte, James Christie (1840). History of the British turf, from the earliest period to the present day, Volume I. London: H. Colburn. OL 6544990M.
- Wright, Howard (1986). The Encyclopaedia of Flat Racing. London: Robert Hale. ISBN 0-7090-2639-0.
