= Bruce Barrymore Halpenny bibliography =

This Bruce Barrymore Halpenny bibliography is a list of books by the author and military historian Bruce Barrymore Halpenny. The author wrote for many magazines in the 1950s, 1960s and 1970s – some under his own name and some under pseudonyms. At one time he was writing articles for up to 14 military journals around the world when he was approached by the publishers Patrick Stephens to do the airfield books due to his vast knowledge and authority. Books are in order by date.

== List of books ==
- Action Stations: Wartime Military Airfields of Lincolnshire and the East Midlands v. 2 (Hardcover) ISBN 978-0-85059-484-3 (1981)
- Action Stations: Military Airfields of Yorkshire v. 4 (Hardcover) ISBN 978-0-85059-532-1 (1982)
- English Electric/BAC Lightning (Hardcover) ISBN 978-0-85045-562-5 (1984)
- To Shatter the Sky: Bomber Airfield at War (Hardcover)ISBN 978-0-85059-678-6 (1984)
- Action Stations: Military Airfields of Greater London v. 8 (Hardcover) ISBN 978-0-85059-585-7 (1984)
- Ghost Stations (Paperback) ISBN 978-0-86303-314-8 (1986)
- Fight for the Sky: Stories of Wartime Fighter Pilots (Hardcover) ISBN 978-0-85059-749-3 (1986)
- Aaargh!: Ghosts, Mystery, Superstition (Paperback) ISBN 978-0-907595-55-7 (1989)
- Wartime Poems (Paperback) ISBN 978-0-907595-69-4 (1990)
- Action Stations: Military Airfields of Yorkshire v. 4 (Hardcover) (Updated version with new material) ISBN 978-1-85260-373-1 (1990)
- Ghost Stations: True Ghost Mystery Stories: No. 3 (Paperback) ISBN 978-0-907595-57-1 (1990)
- Action Stations: Wartime Military Airfields of Lincolnshire and the East Midlands v. 2 (Hardcover) (Updated version with new material) ISBN 978-1-85260-405-9 (1991)
- Ghost Stations: True Ghost Mystery Stories: No. 4 (Paperback) ISBN 978-0-907595-76-2 (1991)
- Little Nellie 007 (Paperback) ISBN 978-0-907595-75-5 (1991)
- Ghost Stations: True Ghost Mystery Stories: No. 5 (Paperback) ISBN 978-0-907595-81-6 (1993)
- Action Stations: Military Airfields of Greater London v. 8 (Hardcover) (Updated version with new material) ISBN 978-1-85260-431-8 (1993)
- Ghost Stations: True Ghost Mystery Stories: No. 6 (Paperback) ISBN 978-0-907595-86-1 (1994)
- Brother Wolf, Wolf Preservation Foundation. ISBN 978-0-9524959-8-7. (1994)
- Ghost Stations 7 (Paperback) ISBN 978-0-907595-97-7 (1995)
- Layman's Guide to Protecting Yourself and Your Property Against Crime (Paperback) ISBN 978-0-9524959-1-8 (1995)
- Ghost Stations 8 (Paperback) ISBN 978-1-900456-02-9 (1998)
- An English Town: Market Rasen (Paperback) (ISBN 978-0954777401) (2004)
- Bomber Aircrew of World War II: True Stories of Frontline Air Combat (Paperback) ISBN 978-1-84415-066-3 (2004)
- Bullets in the Morning...Bullets at Night: The Italian Campaign (Paperback) ISBN 978-0-9547774-1-8 (2004)
- Fighter Pilots in World War II: True Stories of Frontline Air Combat (Paperback) ISBN 978-1-84415-065-6 (2004)
- English Electric Canberra: The History and Development of a Classic Jet (Hardcover) ISBN 978-1-84415-242-1 (2005)
- Avro Vulcan: The History and Development of a Classic Jet (Hardcover) ISBN 978-1-84415-426-5 (2006)
- The Avro Vulcan Adventure (Paperback) ISBN 978-0-9547774-3-2 (2007)
- Ghost Stations 1 (Paperback) (ISBN 978-1-871448-10-8) (2008)
- Ghost Stations 2 (Paperback) (ISBN 978-1-871448-11-5) (2008)
- Ghost Stations 3 (Paperback) (ISBN 978-1-871448-12-2) (2008)
- Ghost Stations 4 (Paperback) (ISBN 978-1-871448-13-9) (2008)
- Ghost Stations 5 (Paperback) (ISBN 978-1-871448-14-6) (2008)
- Ghost Stations Mysteries (Paperback) (ISBN 978-1-871448-08-5) (2008)
- Ghost Stations Lincolnshire (Paperback) (ISBN 978-1-871448-06-1) (2008)
- Ways of the Wolf, Wolf Preservation Foundation. ISBN 978-0952495956. (2011)
