= Beverley Racecourse =

Racecourse in the East Riding of Yorkshire, England

Coordinates: 53°50′41″N 0°27′24″W

Beverley
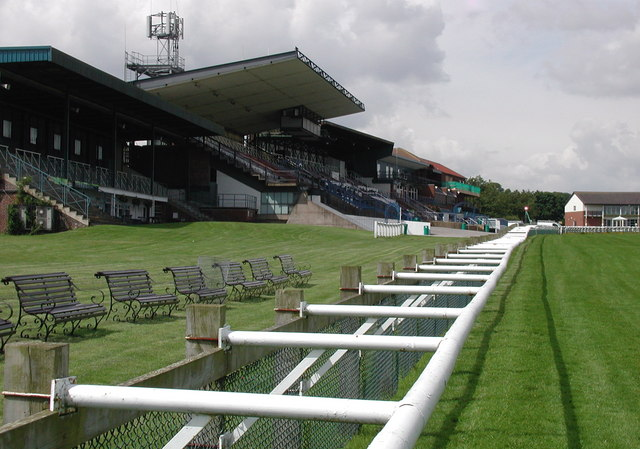
- Beverley Racecourse
- Interactive map of Beverley
- Location: Beverley, East Riding of Yorkshire
- Owned by: Beverley Race Company Ltd.
- Screened on: Racing TV
- Course type: Flat

Beverley Racecourse is a thoroughbred horse racing venue located in the town of Beverley in the East Riding of Yorkshire, England. It has been described as an "unpretentious but agreeable" racecourse.

== History ==
Racing in Beverley can be documented as far back as over 300 years ago, and the founding of The Jockey Club in 1752 really formalised its presence in the town. With the founding of The Jockey Club, the occasional racing at nearby Westwood Pasture was recognised, and Beverley Racecourse was founded. An annual meeting at Beverley was first established in 1767. Before that races had only occasionally been run there. Then, for a short period between 1798 and 1805 racing once again stopped. Later in the 19th century a three-day meeting was taking place annually in the week after York's May meeting.

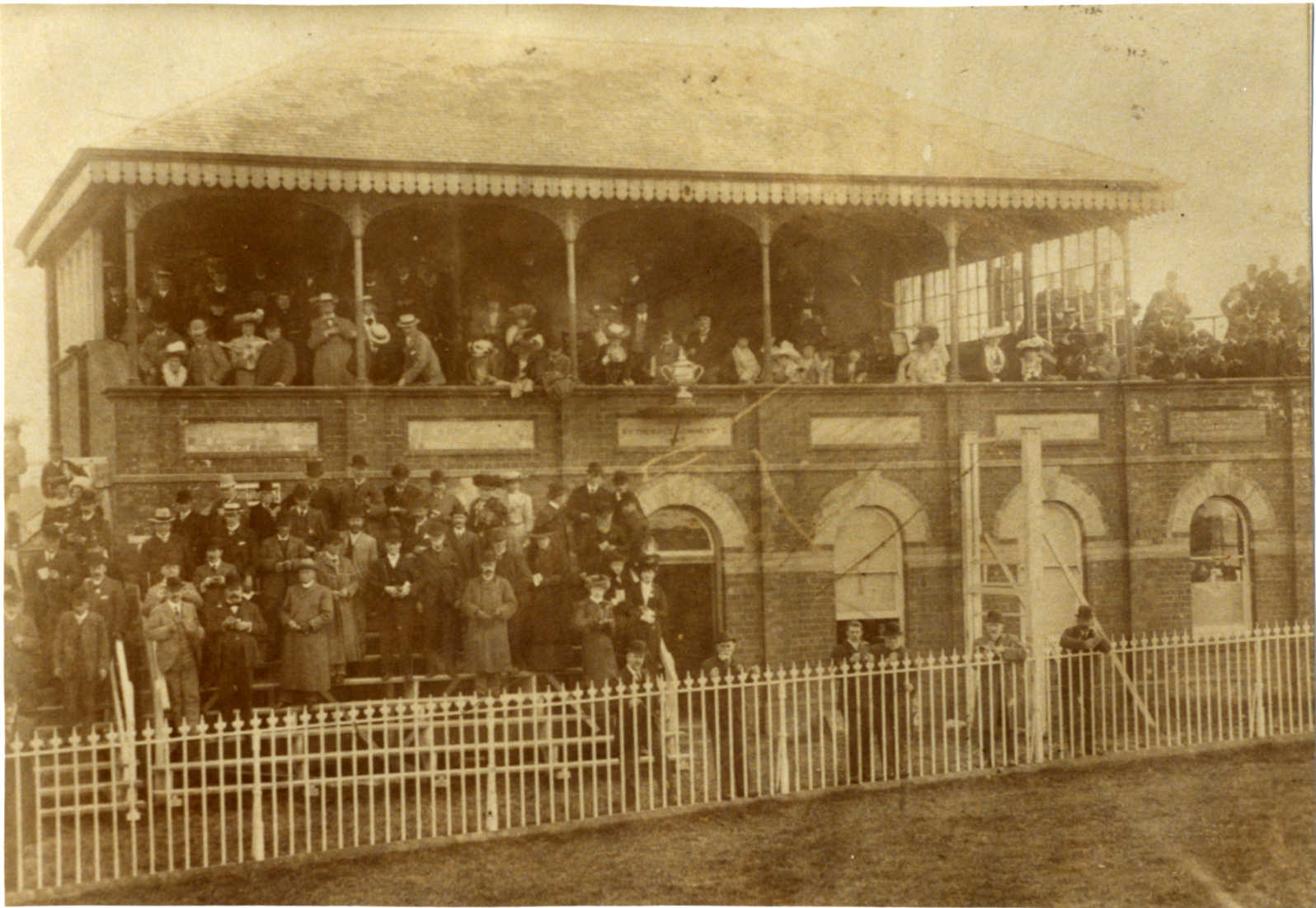
The old grandstand

Between 1915 and November 1920, the racecourse was commandeered by the Royal Flying Corps (the Royal Air Force from April 1918) as a base for fighter aircraft and training during World War I. In 2026, Beverley is scheduled to host racing on 19 days, its most prestigious races being two Listed contests - the Charlie Wood Stakes over one mile and four furlongs in July and Beverley Bullet Sprint over five furlongs in August.

The racecourse is a right-handed flat course, that is just over one mile and three furlongs. It is predominantly flat but with a stiff, uphill finish and tight turns. Beverley has the most pronounced 'draw bias' on a UK racecourse on its five-furlong course. The sharp right-hand bend and the fact that the ground runs away to the left make a low draw (i.e. on the inside rail) much more advantageous than a high draw (i.e. on the wide outside and on ground sloping right to left).

The first grandstand was commissioned for the racecourse on 22 May 1767 at a cost of £1,000. A £90,000 stand was opened in Tattersalls enclosure in 1968.

In August 2018, it was announced that planning permission was being sought for a £4.8 million grandstand to replace the existing 1960s structure, with an expected completion of April 2021. Instead, the racecourse management shifted their strategy from a complete demolition and rebuild to a more conservative, multi-phase refurbishment.

== Notable races ==
Month	DOW	Race Name	Type	Grade	Distance	Age/Sex
May/June	Saturday	Hilary Needler Trophy	Flat	Conditions	5f	2yo f
May/June	Saturday	Two Year Old Trophy	Flat	Conditions	5f	2yo c&g
July	Saturday	Charlie Wood Stakes	Flat	Listed	1m 4f 23y	4yo+
Aug/Sep	Saturday	Beverley Bullet Sprint Stakes	Flat	Listed	5f	3yo+

== See also ==
- List of British racecourses

== Bibliography ==
- Halpenny, Marion Rose (1971). British Racing and Racecourses. Holmes & Sons. ISBN 9780950139722.
- Mortimer, Roger; Onslow, Richard; Willett, Peter (1978). Biographical Encyclopaedia of British Racing. London: Macdonald and Jane's. ISBN 0-354-08536-0.
- Oliver, George (1829). The History and Antiquities of the Town and Minster of Beverley in the County of York, from the Most Early Period. Beverley: M Turner.
- Poulson, George (1829). Beverlac: or, The antiquities and history of the town of Beverley, in the county of York, and of the provostry and collegiate establishment of St. John's; with a minute description of the present minster and the church of St. Mary, and other ancient and modern edifices. Beverley: Longman, Rees, Orme, Brown, and Green.
- Wright, Howard (1986). The Encyclopaedia of Flat Racing. London: Robert Hale. ISBN 0-7090-2639-0.
