= Ken Wallis =

British aviator, inventor and engineer (1916–2013)

Kenneth Horatio Wallis MBE CEng FRAeS
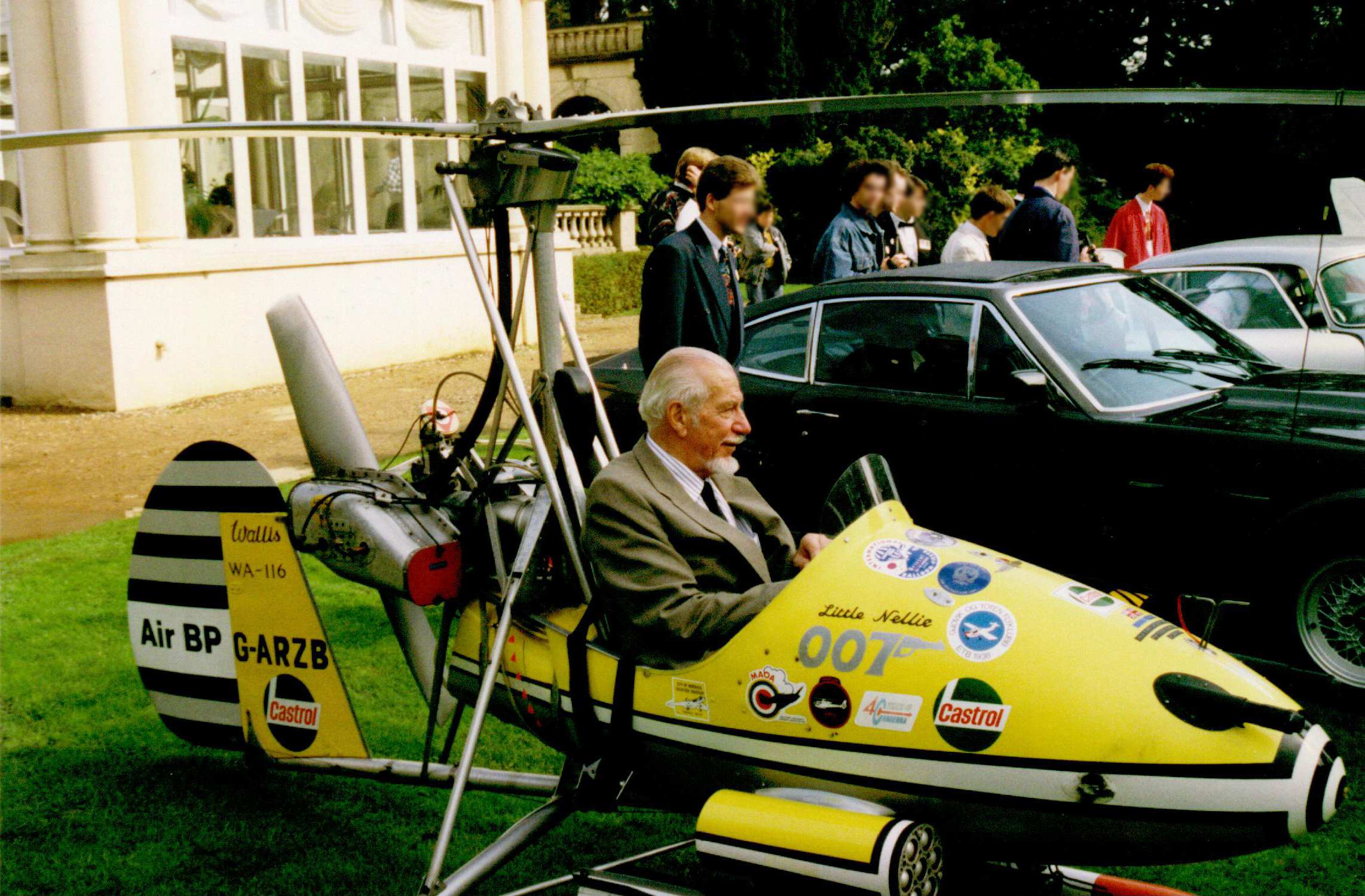
- Ken Wallis sitting in his autogyro Little Nellie
- Born: 26 April 1916; Ely, Cambridgeshire, England
- Died: 1 September 2013 (aged 97); Dereham, Norfolk, England
- Military career
- Allegiance: United Kingdom
- Branch: Royal Air Force
- Service years: 1939–1964
- Rank: Wing Commander
- Units: No. 268 Squadron RAF; No. 103 Squadron RAF; No. 37 Squadron RAF
- Conflicts: World War II
- Awards: Member of the British Empire
- Other work: Leading exponent of autogyros

Wing Commander Kenneth Horatio Wallis MBE CEng FRAeS RAF (26 April 1916 – 1 September 2013) was a British aviator, engineer, and inventor. During the Second World War, Wallis served in the Royal Air Force and flew 28 bomber missions over Germany; after the war, he moved on to research and development, before retiring in 1964. He later became one of the leading exponents of autogyros and earned 34 world records, still holding eight of them at the time of his death in 2013.

== Early life ==
Born on 26 April 1916 at Ely, he was educated at The Kings' School Ely Cambridgeshire. Wallis developed a practical interest in mechanics, building a motorcycle at the age of 11. In 1936, he was inspired by a demonstration by Henri Mignet of his Mignet HM.14 Pou-du-Ciel ("Flying Flea"). Using only Mignet's book, Wallis gathered the materials required, and started to build his own Flying Flea. He abandoned construction because of widespread adverse publicity about fatal accidents that implied inadequate design of the type.

Wallis took an interest in powerboats which he kept up until 1957, when he won the 56-mile (90 km) long Missouri Marathon.

== Military career ==
Wallis applied for the RAF's Volunteer Reserve Service but was turned away because of an issue with his right eye. Consequently, he obtained a private flying licence, which required only a certificate signed by his GP. In 1938, Wallis again tried to join the RAF, but failed the eye test. He applied again in 1939 and finally passed the eye test, explaining, "I did the first line with my good eye then they covered it up and asked me to read the bottom line with my bad eye, without them realising I just turned my head slightly so I could again see with my good eye—I passed it with Above Average Eye Sight!"

Wallis was commissioned in the Royal Air Force Volunteer Reserve on 28 December 1940 as a pilot officer (on probation), with seniority in that rank from 1 December 1940. His commission was confirmed on 28 December 1941 and he was promoted to flying officer (war substantive) with seniority from 1 December 1941. He was promoted to flight lieutenant (war substantive) on 28 December 1942, with seniority from 1 December 1942.

Wallis's military career started with Westland Lysander patrols in the RAF. In 1942, he was transferred to RAF Bomber Command, flying Wellingtons from a base in Lincolnshire. Wallis subsequently served in Italy and on secondment to the United States Strategic Air Command, where he flew the massive Convair B-36, which had six piston engines and four auxiliary jet engines.

Following the end of the Second World War, he was involved in research and development, and was awarded a number of patents on his inventions. On 1 May 1947, his service in the RAF was extended by four years and he transferred to the Technical Branch, with seniority in the rank of flight lieutenant from 1 September 1945. He was given a permanent commission on 22 June 1948, allowing him to serve until retirement. He was promoted to squadron leader on 1 January 1953, and to wing commander on 1 July 1958. He left the RAF in 1964, retiring to Norfolk.

== Autogyros ==
Wallis who lived at Reymerston Hall, Norfolk produced autogyros for, in his own words, "reconnaissance, research and development, surveillance and military purposes", and his designs were not available for enthusiasts as he considered that although the design is simple, it has to be built to the appropriate standards. His contribution to autogyro design included the "offset gimbal rotor head".

Wallis had the help of Beagle Aircraft in building five Wallis WA-116 autogyros at Shoreham in 1962 for evaluation by the British Army. This collaboration ended when the British Army chose the Westland Sioux for this role.

Wallis worked as Sean Connery's stunt pilot in the 1967 James Bond film You Only Live Twice, where he flew one of his WA-116s named Little Nellie.

In 1970 it was announced that Airmark would produce his autogyro design with a certificate of airworthiness, that being essential for commercial use of the autogyro. Expected price was around £3,000.

Between 2006 and 2009, Wallis took part in filming for Into the Wind, a documentary by Steven Hatton featuring the experiences and memories of wartime members of Bomber Command. The film, released in 2012, features Wallis demonstrating several of his autogyro designs.

Wallis was the President of the Norfolk and Suffolk Aviation Museum, and Patron of the Wolf Preservation Foundation.

=== Autogyros and aircraft ===
- Wallbro Monoplane Replica
- Wallis WA-116 Agile
- Wallis WA-117
- Wallis WA-118 Meteorite
- Wallis WA-119
- Wallis WA-120
- Wallis WA-121
- Wallis WA-122

== Recognition ==
Wallis was the recognized world record holder for many categories of autogyro records over the years, and was also recognized as the oldest pilot to set a world flight record at the age of 89. Wallis held most of the autogyro world records during his autogyro flying career. These include the Fédération Aéronautique Internationale time-to-climb, a speed record of 189 km/h (111.7 mph), and the straight-line distance record of 869.23 km (540.11 mi). On 16 November 2002, Wallis increased the speed record to 207.7 km/h (129.1 mph).

Wallis appeared as himself on an episode of Tell The Truth dated 9 November 1984, discussing his autogyro record.

In the 1996 New Year Honours, Wallis received was appointed Member of the Order of the British Empire (MBE) "for services to autogyro development".

In July 2013, Wallis received the Bomber Command clasp to his 1939 to 1945 Star for his 28 bomber missions over Germany during World War II.

== Later life and death ==
Wallis was married to Peggy Stapley, a Women's Auxiliary Air Force veteran, from 1942 to her death in 2003. Wallis died on 1 September 2013, aged 97. Prior to his death, he was living in the Norfolk village of Reymerston.

Old Buckenham Airport held a memorial event on 29 September 2013 at the request of the Wallis family: "A Celebration of the Life of Wing Commander Ken Wallis". It had been expected that about 500 people would attend, but an estimated 3,000 to 4,000 attended the event.

== See also ==
- Little Nellie 007

== Bibliography ==
- Barkham, Patrick. "That magnificent man in his flying machine." The Guardian, 10 August 2010.
- Hancock, Ian. The Lives of Ken Wallis: Engineer and Aviator Extraordinaire. London: Ian Hancock, Fifth edition 2010. ISBN 978-0-9541239-6-3.
- "War veteran reaches for the skies." BBC News, 14 December 2000.
