= Reymerston =

Village in Norfolk, England

Coordinates: 52°36′54″N 0°59′9″E

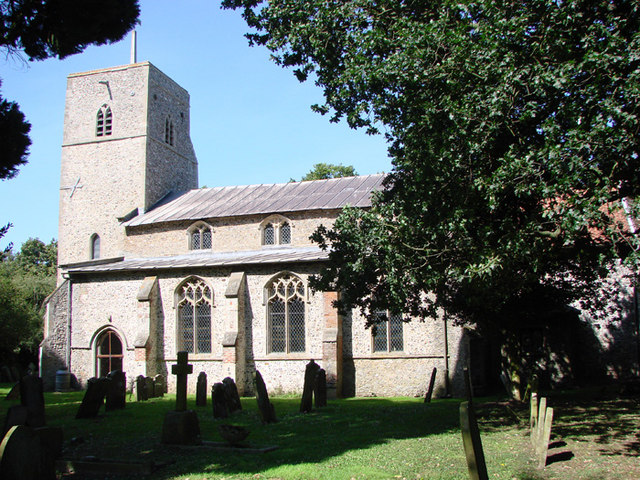
- St Peter's Church, Reymerston

- Location within Norfolk
- Civil parish: Garvestone, Reymerston and Thuxton
- District: Breckland
- Shire county: Norfolk
- Region: East
- Country: England
- Sovereign state: United Kingdom
- Post town: Norwich
- Postcode district: NR9
- Dialling code: 01362
- Police: Norfolk
- Fire: Norfolk
- Ambulance: East of England
- UK Parliament: Mid Norfolk

Reymerston is a village and former civil parish, now in the parish of Garvestone, Reymerston and Thuxton, in the Breckland district, in the county of Norfolk, England, six miles north west of Wymondham, six miles south east of Dereham, and a half mile south west of Thuxton. In 1931 the parish had a population of 220. The village retains a church, St. Peter, which has a weekly service and special events. One of the village's residents was Wing Commander Ken Wallis, who lived at Reymerston Hall. He built autogyros and constructed "Little Nellie" for the James Bond film You Only Live Twice. On the 1st of April 1935 the parish was merged with Thuxton to form "Garveston"; later the parish was renamed to "Garvestone, Reymerston and Thuxton".

The village's name means "Raimar's farm/settlement".

The village is located just off the B1135 Wymondham to Dereham road, and is served by a station on the Mid-Norfolk Railway heritage line in Thuxton. The railway station waiting rooms have been converted into holiday accommodation.
