= David Weston (artist) =

British industrial artist and author

David Weston (1935–2011) was a British industrial artist and author.

== Early life ==
David Weston was born in Belgrave, Leicester, in 1935 to an aircraft engineer father. He initially worked as a draper while pursuing painting in his spare time. Weston's first gallery and workshop were located in Leicester in the late 1960s, at the junction of Barkby Road and Fairfax Road. He supported his artistic endeavors by providing a picture framing service.

== Career ==
Weston made a living painting railway and industrial subjects. He was introduced to this subject by John Scholes of the Clapham Museum and later the British Transport Museum. In the early 1970s, he was commissioned to paint The Great Train Robbery Board Game Box by the Games inventor, Bruce Barrymore Halpenny. Additionally, Weston painted landscapes, usually in acrylic on board. He made at least one painting of Ragdale Hall, which at that time was derelict just before being turned into a health spa. In the mid-1970s, Sir William McAlpine commissioned Weston to paint a series of 24 large canvases on the history of the British steam locomotive. The project took three and a half years to complete and was launched in 1977 at the Royal Exchange in London. The event was televised and attended by the Prince Philip, Duke of Edinburgh, who later invited Weston and McAlpine to meet with him at Buckingham Palace.

Weston gained recognition as "the Railway Artist" in the 1980s after some of his paintings were accepted by the London Transport Museum. He was featured in two television documentaries, including "Beware of Trains," which was broadcast in 1981.

Selected paintings from Weston's History of the Great British Steam Locomotive and Rolls-Royce Fantasia were reproduced as interval slides used by ITV Schools in 1981, 1985 and 1986. In 2009, he was awarded an honorary Doctor of Letters (D.Litt.) by the University of Leicester.

== Later years and death ==
He lived out his final years with his wife Mary at their home in Kirby Bellars, Leicestershire. He died at the age of 75 on 10 May 2011 from Idiopathic pulmonary fibrosis which had been diagnosed 15 years earlier. During his last year, he was too ill to paint. His final exhibition took place at his Kirby Bellars studio in October 2010, and all the exhibited works were sold.

== Selected bibliography ==
- Weston, David (2005). David Weston's England. Tiverton : Halsgrove. ISBN 1-84114-424-X.
- Weston, David (1997). For the love of art. Kirby Bellars. ISBN 0-9526194-9-0.
- Weston, David (1985). Rolls-Royce Fantasia. Leicester : Merriman Enterprises.
- Weston, David (1981). Beware of Trains. Ian Allan. ISBN 0-7110-1060-9.
