= You Only Live Twice (song) =

1967 Bond film theme song

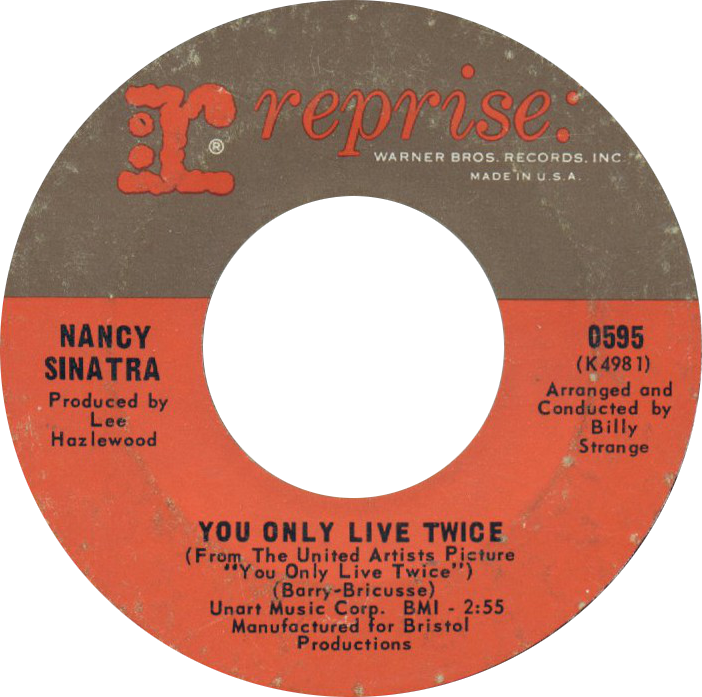
- Side A of the US single

Single by Nancy Sinatra

from the album You Only Live Twice
- B-side: "Jackson"
- Released: 1967
- Recorded: 1967 at the CTS Studios in London
- Genre: Psychedelic pop; orchestral pop; symphonic rock
- Length: 2:55 (single version); 2:44 (soundtrack LP version); 3:28 (soundtrack LP end title version)
- Label: Reprise
- Composer: John Barry
- Lyricist: Leslie Bricusse
- Producer: John Barry

Nancy Sinatra singles chronology
"Jackson" (1967)	"You Only Live Twice" (1967)	"Lightning's Girl" (1967)

James Bond theme singles chronology
"Thunderball" (1965)	"You Only Live Twice" (1967)	"We Have All The Time In The World" (1969)

Audio sample
- Single version: file; help

"You Only Live Twice" is the theme song to the 1967 James Bond film of the same name from its accompanying soundtrack album. It was written by Leslie Bricusse with music by veteran Bond film composer John Barry, and performed by Nancy Sinatra. It is widely recognised for its striking opening bars, featuring a simple 2-bar theme in the high octaves of the violins and lush harmonies from French horns (featuring a melody originally from Alexander Tcherepnin’s “First Piano Concerto (op. 12)"), and is considered by some among the best Bond film songs. Shortly after Barry's production, Sinatra's producer Lee Hazlewood released a more guitar-based single version.

The song has been covered by many artists, including Shirley Bassey, Soft Cell, Björk and Coldplay. In 1998, Robbie Williams re-recorded portions of the song (including the opening strings) for use in his UK number-one single "Millennium".

== Background ==
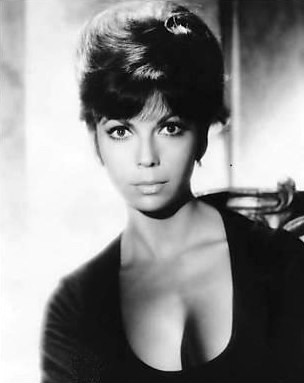
Nancy Sinatra in the 1960s

James Bond veteran John Barry returned to the franchise to produce the score for the 1967 installment You Only Live Twice. The lyrics were by Leslie Bricusse, who had previously cowritten the lyrics for "Goldfinger", the title theme to Goldfinger performed by Shirley Bassey in 1964.

An initial version of the song was performed by Julie Rogers and recorded with a 50- or 60-piece orchestra at CTS Studios. However, this version was not used since Barry decided to re-write and re-record the song: "It was usually the producers that said 'this isn't working, there's a certain something that it needed'. If that energy wasn't there, if that mysterioso kind of thing wasn't there, then it wasn't going to work for the movie." The Rogers song shares only two lines with the final version, "You only live twice", and "you’ll pay the price". Although there are many similarities in the harmony and orchestration with the final version, it is essentially a different song, with a less lush and more ethnic character.

The film's producer, Cubby Broccoli, wanted his friend Frank Sinatra to perform the song. Frank suggested that they use his daughter Nancy Sinatra instead. Barry wanted to use Aretha Franklin, but the producers insisted that he use Nancy Sinatra instead, who was enjoying great popularity in the wake of her single "These Boots Are Made for Walkin'".

The final version (2:44) featured in the film's opening title sequence and on the soundtrack LP is in the key of B and has a single vocal track. The song was recorded with a 60-piece orchestra on 2 May 1967 at the CTS Studios in Bayswater, London. Sinatra later recalled that she was incredibly nervous during the recording, and it took around 30 takes to acquire enough material. Producer John Barry eventually created the final version by incorporating vocals from 25 takes. A longer mix (3:28) was used for the end titles, and incorporates different vocal takes in places.

In UK the soundtrack had been released, but while soundtracks such as Doctor Zhivago and Fiddler on the Roof hit the Top 20 of the UK Albums Chart, You Only Live Twice was less successful. Nancy Sinatra's single version squeezed into the Top 20 of the UK Singles Chart for two weeks only. Barry also released an instrumental version but this failed to chart.

In Japan, the soundtrack was released in a gatefold with images from the film and a plot summary.

The recognizable opening string melody of the song originates from Alexander Tcherepnin's First Piano Concerto (op.12), composed in 1919, although in his version the initial motif is succeeded by a falling octave pattern instead of transposing and repeating the motif in a different key, as is characteristic to "You Only Live Twice".

=== Single version ===
As compared to the soundtrack versions, the single version was constructed from a different set of takes at about the same tempo, but with all instruments and vocals performed a full semitone sharper, in the key of C. It has double-tracked lead vocals, plus backing wordless vocals by an unnamed singer, and occasional backing vocals by Sinatra herself. The iconic lead guitar harmony was replaced by a more subdued guitar at a lower pitch, playing throughout the song. This version also has rock drums gently playing throughout.

The vinyl single was only released in mono. An electronically processed stereo mix (made from a mono source) was eventually released on the circa 1968 Japanese compilation LP Golden Nancy Sinatra, which was reissued on CD and digitally in 2018. A proper stereo mix appeared more widely in 1970 on the Nancy's Greatest Hits LP. In 1986, a new stereo remix of the single version was released on the Nancy Sinatra compilation CD The Hit Years. As compared to the original stereo mix, this version has narrower stereo and centered vocals. It has appeared on many compilations since then. The song was also included on a 1995 reissue of Sinatra's 1966 album Nancy in London. The 1970 stereo mix was eventually reissued on Sinatra's 2021 Start Walkin' 1965–1976 compilation.

=== Critical reception ===
Roy Wood described Barry's string introduction to his song "You Only Live Twice" as "absolute perfection". Mark Monahan of The Daily Telegraph described the lyrics as "mysterious, romantically carpe diem ... at once velvety, brittle and quite bewitching". David Ehrlich of Rolling Stone ranked "You Only Live Twice" the third best James Bond theme song, calling it "a classic."

== Cover versions ==
The song has been covered by a wide variety of artistes.

- Nancy Sinatra recorded a different chart version produced by Lee Hazlewood and arranged by session guitarist Billy Strange featuring a guitar backing with Sinatra's voice double tracked as a pun on the word "Twice".
- Björk recorded a version for the 1997 album Shaken and Stirred: The David Arnold James Bond Project but it was not included on the album. Although no official reason was given for its removal at the time, Björk later explained, on being asked about her cover of the song; "I learned the hard way that you should never cover your favorite tunes because they are good already. Cover bad tunes and make them good."
- Robbie Williams re-recorded portions of the song (including the opening strings) for use in his 1998 single "Millennium" from his album I've Been Expecting You.

== In popular culture ==
The song was used in the closing montage of Mad Men's 2012 season five finale, "The Phantom".

== Charts ==
Chart (1967)	Peak position
Australian ARIA Charts	10
Canadian Singles Chart	39
UK Singles Chart	11
US Billboard Hot 100	44
US Easy Listening	3

== See also ==
- James Bond music
