= Wallis WA-120 =

WA-120
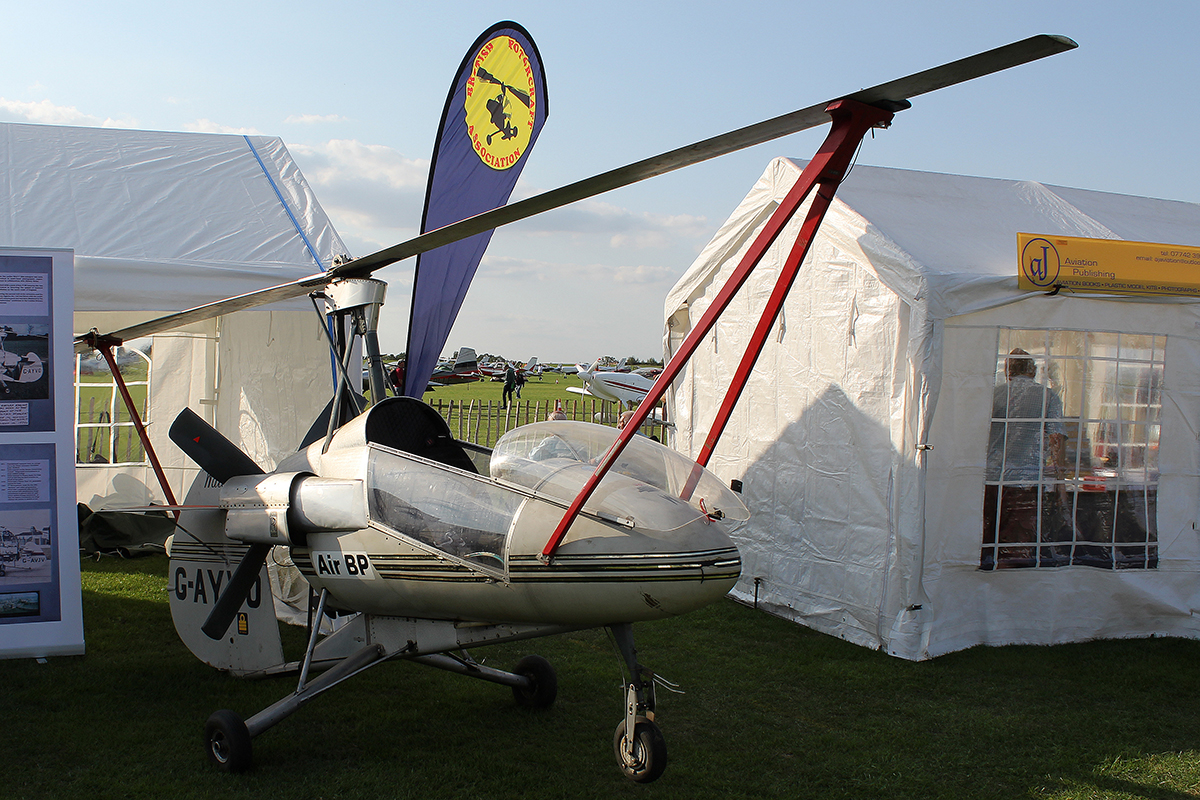

General information
- Type: Single-seat autogyro
- National origin: United Kingdom
- Manufacturer: Wallis Autogyros Limited
- Designer: Ken Wallis
- Number built: 1

History
- First flight: 13 June 1971

The Wallis WA-120 is an experimental British autogyro developed by Ken Wallis.

== Design and development ==
Following on from his family of single-seat autogyros former Royal Air Force aviator Wing Commander Ken Wallis developed a high-performance long-range variant with an enclosed cockpit. The WA-120, registered G-AYVO, was first flown on 13 June 1971. The autogyro is powered by a 130 hp (97 kW) Rolls-Royce Continental O-240-A piston engine driving a four-bladed pusher propeller.

== Specification ==
Data from British Civil Aircraft since 1919 – Volume 3

General characteristics

- Crew: 1
- Length: 12 ft 0 in (3.66 m)
- Empty weight: 460 lb (209 kg)
- Gross weight: 750 lb (340 kg)
- Powerplant: 1 × Rolls-Royce Continental O-240-A , 130 hp (97 kW)
- Main rotor diameter: 20 ft 4 in (6.20 m)

Performance

- Cruise speed: 103 mph (165 km/h, 90 kn)
- Range: 360 mi (579 km, 310 nmi)

== See also ==
Related development

- Wallis WA-116 Agile

Related lists

- List of rotorcraft
