= The Great Train Robbery (board game) =

- original The Great Train Robbery board game
- Designers: Bruce Barrymore Halpenny
- Illustrators: Bruce Barrymore Halpenny
- Publishers: ANZIO Publishing
- Publication: Early 1970s
- Genres: Board game, race game
- Players: 2 to 6
- Chance: Mid (dice, card-drawing, luck)
- Age range: 9 to adult
- Skills: Counting, reading, decisions, judgement

The Great Train Robbery is a board game created by British military historian and author Bruce Barrymore Halpenny in the early 1970s, and is based upon the actual Great Train Robbery that took place on 8 August 1963 in Buckinghamshire. Although based on the Great Train Robbery, the board game has been adapted on a few small points, one being the extra farm house that was added for playing purposes. The game is a form of strategy race game, with the robber player trying to avoid the police players.

The game itself took three days and three nights for Halpenny to design, and then three years to bring onto the market. The famous train artist David Weston was commissioned by Halpenny to paint the box.

The board of the game was original, a change from most board games at the time which tended to be adaptations of other games. The board is made up of a complex and extensive road network, down which the robbers escape from the train, and through which the police chase the robbers or set road block traps. Its rules are easy to interpret, but players have to use a fair amount of judgement and skill in order to trap or avoid trapping each other.

The game, as well as having a good response in Britain in a year when the indoor games market had taken a knock, was equally popular in West Germany, where a television series called Die Gentlemen bitten zur Kasse, based on the 1963 robbery, had been a tremendous success. It was also used as a prize on British TV shows such as Tiswas and Crackerjack.

In an interview, Bruce Halpenny said, “With crime you deal with every basic human emotion and also have enough elements to combine action with melodrama. The player’s imagination is fired as they plan to rob the train. Because of the gamble they take in the early stage of the game there is a build up of tension, which is immediately released once the train is robbed. Release of tension is therapeutic and useful in our society, because most jobs are boring and repetitive.”

== Reviews ==
- Games and Puzzles
