= Thuxton =

Village in Norfolk, England

Coordinates: 52°37′N 1°00′E

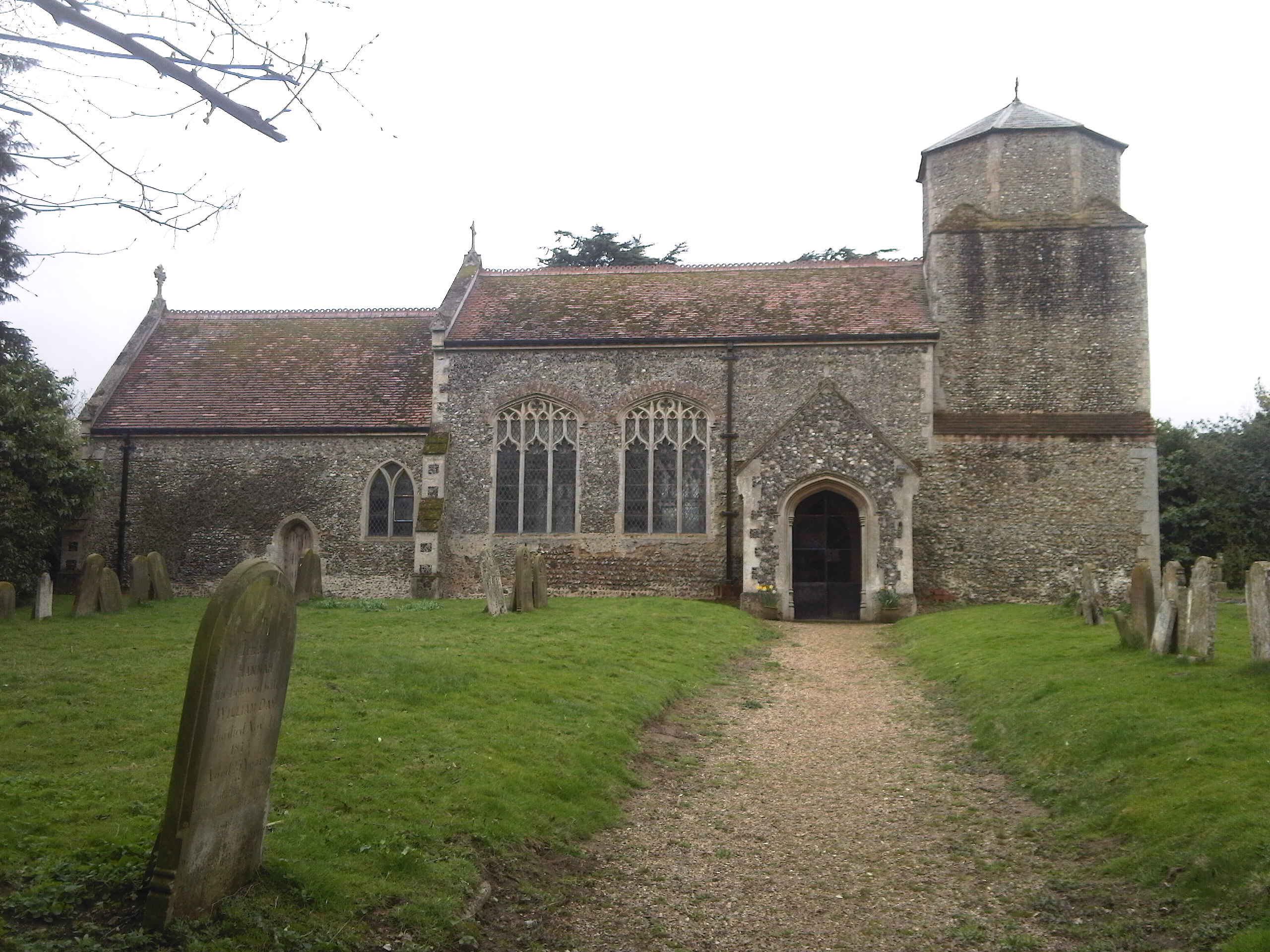
- Thuxton church, 2009

- Location within Norfolk
- Civil parish: Garvestone, Reymerston and Thuxton
- District: Breckland
- Shire county: Norfolk
- Region: East
- Country: England
- Sovereign state: United Kingdom
- Post town: NORWICH
- Postcode district: NR9
- Dialling code: 01362
- Police: Norfolk
- Fire: Norfolk
- Ambulance: East of England
- UK Parliament: Mid Norfolk

Thuxton is a small village and former civil parish, now in the parish of Garvestone, Reymerston and Thuxton, in the Breckland district, in the county of Norfolk, England. It is 6 miles north west of Wymondham and 5 miles south east of Dereham.

The village is located just off the B1135 Wymondham to Dereham road, and is served by a station on the Mid-Norfolk Railway heritage line. The railway station waiting rooms have been converted into holiday accommodation.

== History ==
Thuxton is an ancient settlement that has been connected with surrounding communities for centuries.

The Domesday Book of 1086 shows the village written in Old English as Thursetuna; Thurse (given name of a Viking lord) - tun (a u-stem noun meaning homestead/manor) - a (a genitive case masculine declension that shows possession). Thuxton was located in the hundred of Mitford in the shire of Norfolk, with about 26 households, containing (tallying only males of full age) 9 villagers, 13 freemen, 11 smallholders and 4 slaves. This meant Thuxton was in the largest 40% of settlements in post-conquest England.

Thuxton is listed by archaeologists as the site of a deserted medieval linear village, with 29 tofts having been located in the 1980s.

In 1845 Thuxton (also known as Thurston parish at that time) had a population of 103 inhabitants, a few scattered farm-houses and cottages, and 1085 acres of land, belonging to Lord Wodehouse, Edward Lombe Esq., William Palmer, John Taylor, R. Butcher, and a few smaller freeholders. There were two manors, with Lord Wodehouse as lord of Thuxton Hall and Edward Lombe, Esq., as lord of Thuxton Waces. The resident farmers were Peregrine Hardy, William Palmer, John Taylor, and Caleb Vassar.

In 1931 Thuxton parish had a population of 83. The village retains a church, St Paul's, which has a monthly service and special events. On 1 April 1935 Thuxton parish was merged with Garveston parish and Reymerston parish to form "Garveston" CP/AP (where CP/AP is a 21st century annotation indicating a civil parish and Anglican parish with coincident boundaries). On 4 August 1999 the expanded parish of Garveston was renamed Garvestone. On 5 January 2019 the parish of Garvestone was renamed to become the parish of Garvestone, Reymerston and Thuxton.
