= Garvestone =

Village in Norfolk, England

Coordinates: 52.625°N 0.992°E

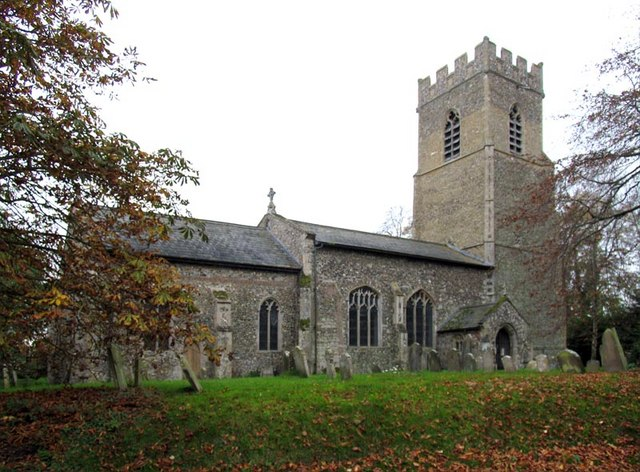
- St Margaret's Church, Garveston

- Location within Norfolk
- Area: 5.61 sq mi (14.5 km^{2})
- Population: 743 (2021 census)
  - Density: 132/sq mi (51/km^{2})
- OS grid reference: TG025072
- Civil parish: Garvestone, Reymerston and Thuxton
- District: Breckland
- Shire county: Norfolk
- Region: East
- Country: England
- Sovereign state: United Kingdom
- Post town: NORWICH
- Postcode district: NR9
- Dialling code: 01362
- Police: Norfolk
- Fire: Norfolk
- Ambulance: East of England
- UK Parliament: Mid Norfolk

Garvestone (or Garveston) is a village and former civil parish, now in the parish of Garvestone, Reymerston and Thuxton, in the Breckland district, in the English county of Norfolk.

Garvestone is located 3.8 miles (6.1 km) south-east of Dereham and 7 miles (11 km) north-west of Wymondham, on the upper reaches of the River Yare.

== History ==
Garveston's name is of Anglo-Saxon and Viking origin, and derives from an amalgamation of the Old English and Old Norse for ‘Geirulfr's settlement or farmstead’.

In the Domesday Book of 1086, Garveston is listed as a settlement of 27 households in the hundred of Mitford. In 1086, the village was part of the East Anglian estates of Henry de Ferrers.

Parts of RAF Shipdham stray into Garvestone. The airfield was used by the American Eighth and Twelfth Air Forces during the Second World War.

On 1 April 1935 the parishes of Reymerston and Thuxton were merged with Garveston, on 4 August 1999 the merged parish was renamed "Garvestone, Reymerston & Thuxton". In 1931 the parish of Garveston (prior to the merge) had a population of 265.

== Geography ==
According to the 2021 census, Garvestone, Reymerston & Thuxton have a population of 743 people which shows an increase from the 660 people recorded in the 2011 census.

Garvestone is located along the course of the River Yare.

== St. Margaret's Church ==
Garvestone's parish church is dedicated to Saint Margaret the Virgin and dates from the Fourteenth Century. St. Margaret's is located within the village on Dereham Road and has been Grade II listed since 1960. The church holds Sunday services once a month.

St. Margaret's was heavily restored in the Victorian era but still boasts a font from the Fifteenth Century.

== Notable residents ==
- Edward Wright- (1561–1615) mathematician and cartographer, born in Garvestone.

== Governance ==
Garvestone is part of the electoral ward of Mattishall for local elections and is part of the district of Breckland.

The village's national constituency is Mid Norfolk which has been represented by the Conservative's George Freeman MP since 2010.

== War memorial ==
Garvestone & Thuxton War Memorial is located in St. Margaret's Churchyard and lists the following names for the First World War:

Rank	Name	Unit	Date of death	Burial/Commemoration
Sgt.	Harry A. Newson	59th Bty., Royal Garrison Artillery	19 Jul. 1918	Bienvillers Cemetery
LCpl.	Willie Read	9th Bn., East Lancashire Regiment	27 Feb. 1917	Doiran Memorial
LCpl.	Sidney E. Jowlings	7th Bn., Norfolk Regiment	22 Nov. 1917	Tincourt Cemetery
Gnr.	Algernon H. P. Easlea	99th Bty., Royal Garrison Artillery	19 Jan. 1918	Chocques Cemetery
Pnr.	George E. Stocking	8 (Foreway) Coy., Royal Engineers	30 Sep. 1918	Beuvry Cemetery
Pte.	Colin L. Whitehand	8th Bn., East Surrey Regiment	20 Nov. 1918	Old Garrison Cemetery
Pte.	Jesse A. Ward	13th Bn., Royal Fusiliers	4 Oct. 1917	Zantvoorde Cemetery
Pte.	Percy Howard	12th Bn., Suffolk Regiment	13 Jul. 1918	Tourcoing Cemetery

The following names were added after the Second World War:

Rank	Name	Unit	Date of death	Burial/Commemoration
FSgt.	Ernest W. Greenwood	No. 83 (Bomber) Squadron RAF	25 Apr. 1944	Dürnbach Cemetery
Pte.	Cyril G. Softley	4th Bn., Royal Norfolk Regiment	8 May 1943	Kanchanaburi War Cemetery
Pte.	William G. Richardson	5th Bn., Royal Norfolks	23 Jan. 1942	Kranji War Cemetery
Pte.	James Mann	4th Bn., Seaforth Highlanders	4 Jun. 1940	Dunkirk Memorial
