= Bruce Barrymore Halpenny =

English military historian and writer (1937–2015)

Bruce Barrymore Halpenny (1937 – 3 May 2015) was an English military historian and writer, specializing in airfields and aircraft, as well as ghost stories and mysteries. He was also a broadcaster and games inventor.

== Early life ==
Halpenny's father was a Canadian First World War soldier who fought at Vimy Ridge, and his mother was a British First World War munitions worker from Lincolnshire. Bruce himself was from Lincolnshire, England.

== Military career ==
Halpenny served in the Royal Air Force Police (RAFP) in specialist units, often overseas. In the 1950s, whilst in the RAFP, he was wounded and had to undergo several operations to save his hand and arm.

After being wounded, he moved across to the RAF Police on Special Security Duties (Atomic & Chemical Weapons), and was part of a special RAF military police unit in the Nuclear Division, responsible for protecting the nuclear weapons to be used by the V bombers in times of war.

== Literary career ==
In rehabilitation from his wounding during RAFP service, he started writing and research as a hobby, before turning it into his profession in later years after leaving the forces.

=== Early years ===
In the early period of his writing career, Halpenny started out by writing love stories and cowboy stories for the American market under pen names. Because of his specialist knowledge of the Royal Air Force, he began to focus on military history, especially that of the RAF in the Second World War, often with deep insights, facts, and personal human interest stories. At one time, he was writing articles for up to 14 military journals around the world, when he was approached by the publishers Patrick Stephens to write the Airfield books due to his vast knowledge and authority.

=== Military history ===
When he researched the British RAF airfield histories, particularly those of London, Yorkshire and Lincolnshire, Halpenny found that public records held very little, if any, information so he had to do all the research himself going back to the very beginning. This helped to unearth a rich source of information, which others have since used, and made Halpenny an undisputed RAF expert. For his research on the airfields, Halpenny interviewed 1,400 people, researched records and letters, and traveled thousands of miles. Halpenny visited each and every airfield he wrote about (some of which he had prior knowledge of from his military days) to ensure accuracy.

His books quickly became essential reference books for all aviation historians. Virtually all of the information was new, in the sense that it had not appeared in the dozens of books which had been written about the RAF, new too were the many photographs that were just a selection of the thousands he collected and commissioned. In the opening chapters of his book Action Stations 2 Wartime Military Airfields of Lincolnshire and the East Midlands, there were a selection of control tower photos – this was the first time this had been done in any book.

He also wrote various military themed books from such as English Electrical/BAC Lightning to Wartime Poems. He specialized in the British jets, English Electric Lightning, English Electric Canberra and Avro Vulcan.

==== English Electric/BAC Lightning ====
The English Electric/BAC Lightning (ISBN 978-0-85045-562-5) is an aviation book by British military historian and author Bruce Barrymore Halpenny about the English Electric Lightning. It was published by Osprey Publishing as part of their Air Combat series. It was a best seller in Grimsby, the home town of the Lightning.

The author spent nine months researching the Lightnings with the pilots of 5 and 11 Squadrons and Binbrook's own Lightning Training Flight. To gather information for the book, the author talked to men like, Sqdn Ldr Dave Carden (with 3,000 plus hours, the most experienced Lightning pilot in the world) and fellow pilots and ground staff.

The book itself gives an insight into the workings of RAF Binbrook, its Lightnings, and the men that fly and maintain them. Sqdn Ldr Dave Carden takes the reader on a typically "hair-raising mission", while another section is devoted to a pilot's experiences when his aircraft caught fire and crashed into the sea off Flamborough Head in 1981. It also deals with the Quick Reaction Alert shed, where two fully armed Lightnings and their pilots were on constant standby to intercept Russian aircraft which used to sometimes fly to within 100 miles of Spurn Point.

==== To Shatter the Sky ====
To Shatter the Sky, subtitled Bomber Airfield at War, is a book and also a BBC television programme of the same name by the military historian, author and screenwriter Bruce Barrymore Halpenny.

The author was already working on the book when he was approached by the BBC to produce a related theme for a history programme, hence the book and programme sharing the same name. The programme was aired on BBC1 in late 1983 and the book launched in early 1984. The book (ISBN 978-0-85059-678-6) tells of the day-to-day activities at bomber stations between 1939 and 1945, where the author had meticulously researched his material. It draws extensively on reminiscences from surviving crew members who served at stations such as Waddington, Scampton, Skellingthorpe, Binbrook, Fiskerton, Bardney, Woodhall Spa, and many others.

The book also recalls the stories of those that did not survive or were shot down over enemy territory. A routine flight from RAF Skellingthorpe that turned into a nightmare, and memories of raids on Nuremberg, Düsseldorf and Hamburg, where airmen watched their comrades shot out of the sky by a barrage of deadly enemy flak, all help to paint a picture of what it was like to be an airman based in wartime England.

The book was the basis for a BBC television programme with the same title, which plots the history and present conditions of seven RAF and USAF airfields in the East Midlands. Halpenny scripted the programme and merged wartime film footage with up-to-date shots. The film cameraman was Dick Kursa, the film editor was John Rosser, and the producer was Mike Derby. First shown on BBC1 at 10.15pm on 11 February 1983.

==== Little Nellie 007 ====
Little Nellie 007 is a 1991 book by Bruce Barrymore Halpenny about the James Bond autogyro, Little Nellie, as featured in the film You Only Live Twice, and her creator, Wing Commander Ken Wallis.

The book, known to James Bond fans, and also used as a reference book for other Bond books, gives a behind-the-scenes look at the making of the film, as well as providing all the location shoots for the film, and also a brief history of aviation legend Ken Wallis. Halpenny and Wallis were friends and both ex-Royal Air Force.

The book briefly delves into Ken Wallis's early family connections with aviation, then onto his own World War II exploits, first as an operational pilot in the Army Co-operation Command flying Lysanders and then as an operational captain of Wellington bombers. Finally, the reader is brought to Wallis’s post-war activities and early stunt filming in Brazil, (some around the statue of Christ by the Corcovado Mountain at Rio de Janeiro and at one point accidentally getting caught in one of Brazil’s notorious "ventana" windstorms) and Italy.

The book then gives the behind the scenes information about Little Nellie, a Wallis WA-116 Agile, and the filming.

Bibliography

- Little Nellie 007 on Amazon ISBN 978-0-907595-75-5
- James Bond 007: Aproximación a una saga by Luis Saavedra Castaño — Published by Saimel Ediciones, 2000. Original from the University of Michigan. Digitized February 26, 2008 (229 pages)

==== Bomber Aircrew of World War II ====
Bomber Aircrew of World War II: True Stories of Frontline Air Combat (ISBN 978-1-84415-066-3) is a book by military historian and author Bruce Barrymore Halpenny. It is about the aircrew of RAF Bomber Command in World War II. This group had over 300,000 operations flying over enemy territory during the war, losing 50,000 airmen and 8,000 British aircraft.

The book has first hand accounts by veteran RAF aircrew and their support staff, giving an insight into life in RAF Bomber Command as well as the creation and development of the bomber airfield for a new form of war. There is also a full account of all of Bomber Command's Victoria Cross awards. Reviewers have noted that the book also features previously unpublished photographs.

==== English Electric Canberra ====
The English Electric Canberra subtitled The History and Development of a Classic Jet (ISBN 978-1-84415-242-1) is a book by British military historian and author Bruce Barrymore Halpenny about the English Electric Canberra. Illustrated throughout, the book includes interviews with Wing Commander K H Wallis, the man Halpenny attributes as having "saved the Canberra".

The book looks at the development of the aircraft during the early days of jet power and beyond. Each of the many marks and variants are described. The type's record of service with RAF Squadrons is given together with descriptions of the many experimental models.

In the introduction, the author states, “it was a matter of producing either a technical book, or one that would appeal to a wider readership, setting out the true Canberra story: marks, variants, overseas orders, squadrons, records, experimental Canberras, camouflage, markings, and most importantly, the truth about bombing up the aircraft; also serious problems with which the Canberra was sent out to operational R.A.F. stations." He chose the latter and the finished article is an "outstanding" tribute to a remarkable aeroplane, though those that were deep aviation fans were unhappy that it was not a technical book. A case that the author could not satisfy everyone.

The book took 18 years to complete and the acknowledgments cover two full pages - a testimony to the thoroughness of Halpenny's research. Among the many firms and names mentioned, one in particular comes in for special mention. W/Cdr. K H Wallis, who saved the life of the Canberra by inventing the system of loading bombs for as late at 1951 at R.A.F. Binbrook, not a single aircraft was capable of delivering bombs, simply because the fuselage was too low to the ground!

With Canberra's introduction came the early Rolls-Royce Axial Flow Avon engine, a full description of which, its history and development is given in Chapter 2 - the author even tells us how a jet engine delivers its thrust.

The book displays a collection of photographs - some never seen before, also the history and deployment of no less than 81 Squadrons each of which flies the Canberra in its various marks and roles.

=== Ghosts and mysteries ===
Halpenny had been writing ghost stories in the 1960s, and encountering ghost stories in his exhaustive research into airfield histories, when in 1984 he decided they should form the subject of a special book, and so started to add to, and research his 'ghost-mystery' files about abandoned airfields that murmur and whisper with ghosts. By 1984, he had become acknowledged as not only a respected British military historian, expert in airfield histories, but also the expert in RAF Ghosts, especially surrounding airfields. Ghost Stations was born, and in 1986 the first book was published, and proved a best seller as it recounts how "headless airmen and other spectres have appeared in control towers and other Service buildings throughout the country". Such was demand that a second book entitled, Aaargh! was published with over 30 stories, one of which was The eerie mystery of Lightning 894. Aaargh!, was later to become Ghost Stations 2, as more books later followed over the years, and became the cult series of Ghost Stations books.

Halpenny's unique knowledge and position meant that he was also known for accessing and finding information generally closed to the general public and media, especially Ministry of Defence (MoD) material concerning UFOs.

Halpenny always maintained that all airfields are haunted. Over the years, he uncovered a wealth of material about ghostly experiences on wartime airfields. "The evidence of ghosts keeps popping up and is so rich that it cannot be ignored," he said continuing, "You have to remember that 55,000 men of Bomber Command died while operating from Britain in World War Two, and almost all of them met a violent end, so it isn't surprising that dozens of earthbound spirits have been left behind."

== Games inventor ==
Halpenny was also a games inventor, and created The Great Train Robbery board game in the 1970s. It was used as a prize on shows such as Tiswas and Crackerjack.

== Charities, causes and animal rights ==
Halpenny was always vocal in his campaigns for numerous organizations and causes, especially concerning veterans, war widows, wounded and invalided servicemen and women. He also helped schools and children's charities such as Mencap, in campaigning and highlighting issues, and even in one case when he donated a vintage bottle of wine to help raise funds. The bottle was unique in that it was the last bottle remaining after the Nazis had plundered the cellars of families living in an Italian Abruzzo village in World War II. The author's uncle was a Canadian tank commander whose tank was the first to liberate the village, and was also the first tank to enter Ortona in the Battle of Ortona. The bottle was given to the author, as he lived in Abruzzo and his research work had taken him to that area. Halpenny said on donating the bottle:

Because the bottle is unique, it seemed a waste to just drink it without using it to gain some benefit for others.

He also long campaigned for the Government to do their part and preserve a 1939-45 War airfield in its original condition; to let future generations see how the RAF operated during those dark days.

If something isn't done to preserve one of them soon, we'll get to the silly situation where one is built from scratch as a memorial to the RAF's effort in the last war.

— Bruce Barrymore Halpenny

He was a long-term supporter for animal welfare, especially dogs and wolves, and was the president of the Wolf Preservation Foundation.

== Family ==
Bruce and his wife, equestrian writer and horsewoman, Marion Rose Halpenny, had a son, Baron Barrymore Halpenny, a commercial artist.

== Books ==
- Action Stations 2: Military Airfields of Lincolnshire and the East Midlands. Patrick Stephens Ltd. 1981. ISBN 978-0-850594-84-3.
- Action Stations 4: Military Airfields of Yorkshire. Patrick Stephens Ltd. 1982. ISBN 978-0-850595-32-1.
- Action Stations 8: Military Airfields of Greater London. Haynes Publishing Group. 1984. ISBN 978-0-850595-85-7.
- English Electric/BAC Lightning. Osprey Publishing Ltd. 1984. ISBN 978-0-85045-562-5.
- To Shatter the Sky: Bomber Airfield at War. Patrick Stephens Ltd. 1984. ISBN 978-0-85059-678-6.
- Fight for the Sky: True stories of wartime fighter pilots. Patrick Stephens Ltd. 1986. ISBN 978-0-85059-749-3.
- Wartime Poems. Casdec Ltd. 1990. ISBN 978-0-907595-69-4.
- An English Town: Market Rasen. Anzio Group. 2004. ISBN 978-0-9547774-0-1.
- Bullets in the Morning...Bullets at Night: The Italian Campaign. Anzio Group. 2004. ISBN 978-0-9547774-1-8.
- English Electric Canberra. Penn & Sword Books. 2005. ISBN 978-1-84415-242-1.
- The Avro Vulcan Adventure. Anzio Group. 2007. ISBN 978-0-9547774-3-2.
- Ghost Stations (book series) 1986–2012

== See also ==
- Bruce Barrymore Halpenny bibliography
