= Wallis WA-116 Agile =

British autogyro

WA-116 Agile
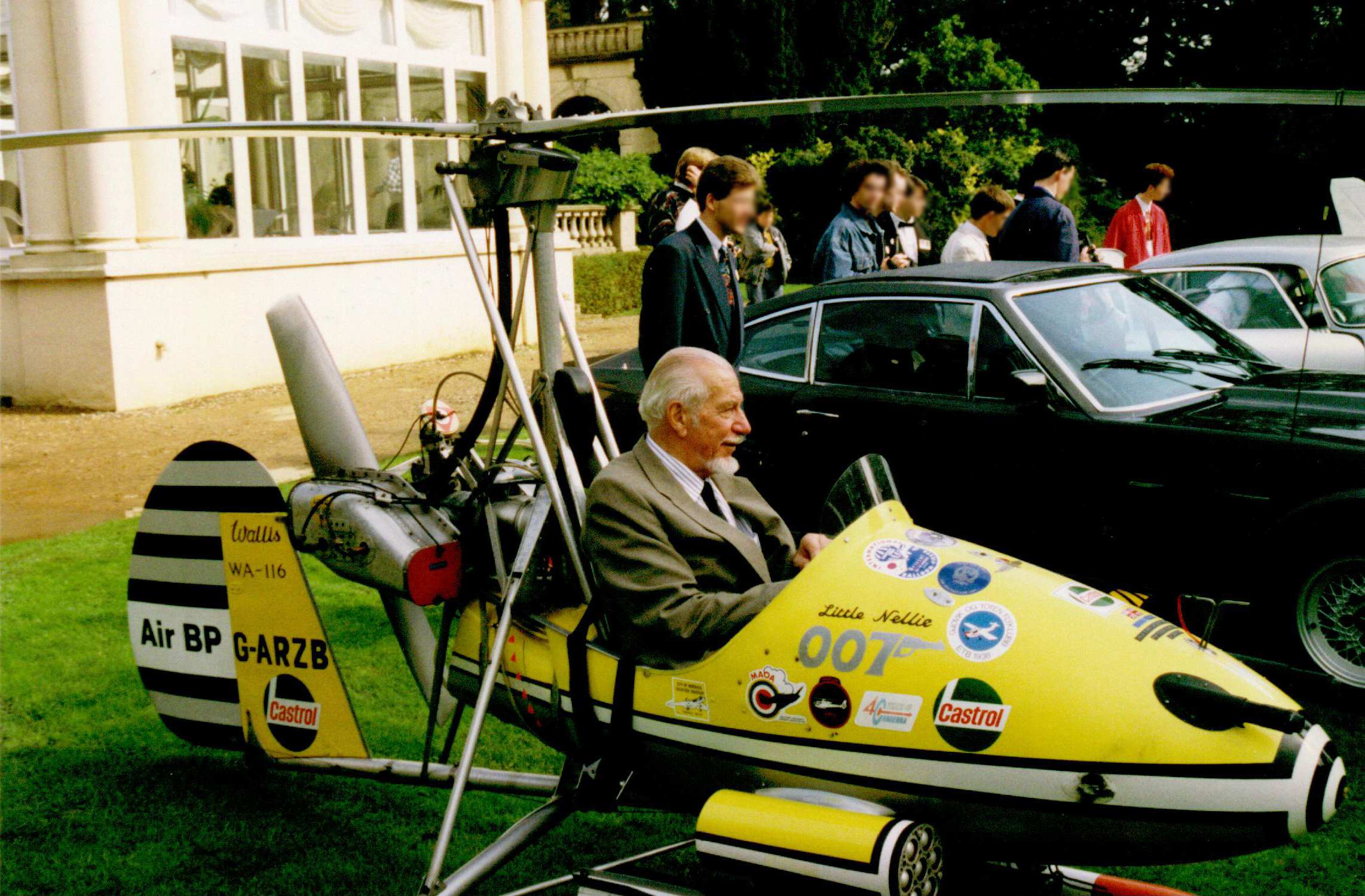
- Little Nellie, pictured with its creator Ken Wallis in the cockpit

General information
- Type: Single-seat autogyro
- National origin: United Kingdom
- Manufacturer: Wallis Autogyros Limited
- Designer: Ken Wallis
- Number built: 10+

History
- First flight: 2 August 1961

The Wallis WA-116 Agile is a British autogyro developed in the early 1960s by former Royal Air Force Wing Commander Ken Wallis. The aircraft was produced in a number of variants, one of which, nicknamed Little Nellie, was flown in the 1967 James Bond film You Only Live Twice. Little Nellie and another sixteen of his autogyros are on static display at the Land Rover showroom owned by his second cousin, in Barton, Cambridgeshire.

== Design and development ==
Wing Commander Ken Wallis, a former RAF pilot, developed a number of improvements to the autogyro design, including the offset gimbal rotor head which gives the autogyro hands-off stability. Wallis' first prototype autogyro, registered G-ARRT, was first flown on 2 August 1961.

== Operational history ==
In 1962, five WA-116s were built by Beagle Aircraft at Shoreham, three of which were for evaluation by the British Army Air Corps. Wallis flew one of these aircraft, XR942, at that year's Farnborough Air Show.

In 1966, one of the Beagle-built WA-116s, registered G-ARZB, was modified for use in the James Bond film You Only Live Twice. Little Nellie was named after legendary music hall performer Nellie Wallace.

Few Wallis autogyros have been operated privately, with nearly all of them being used for research and demonstration flying by Wallis himself. Wallis withdrew all his autogyros from use by anyone other than himself, after the crash of WA-117 G-AXAR at the 1970 Farnborough Air Show.

== Operators ==
United Kingdom

- Army Air Corps

== Variants ==
WA-116 Agile
Prototype autogyro powered by a Wallis-McCulloch 4318A engine.
WA-116-T
Two-seat variant, one built.
WA-117 Venom
Variant powered by a 100 hp (75 kW) Continental O-200-B engine.
WA-118 Meteorite
Variant powered by a 120 hp (89 kW) Wallis-modified Meteor Alfa supercharged two-stroke engine.
WA-119
Variant powered by a 40 hp water-cooled 990 cc Hillman Imp engine.
WA-121
Streamlined variant for high-altitude research with a Wallis-McCulloch 4318A engine; a single WA-121 was built in 1972.

== Specifications (WA-116) ==
Data from British Civil Aircraft since 1919 – Volume 3, Flight 31 March 1966 : The Wallis Autogyros

General characteristics

- Crew: 1
- Length: 11 ft (3.4 m)
- Empty weight: 255 lb (116 kg)
- Gross weight: 550 lb (249 kg)
- Fuel capacity: 58 lb (26.3 kg)
- Powerplant: 1 × Wallis-McCulloch 4318A 4-cylinder air-cooled horizontally-opposed piston engine, 72 hp (54 kW)
- Main rotor diameter: 20 ft 4 in (6.20 m)
- Main rotor area: 324.8 sq ft (30.17 m^{2})
- Propellers: 2-bladed fixed-pitch pusher propeller

Performance

- Maximum speed: 87 kn (100 mph, 161 km/h)
- Range: 209 nmi (241 mi, 387 km)
- Endurance: 2 hours 27 minutes
- Service ceiling: 10,000 ft (3,000 m)
- Time to altitude: 1,000 ft (305 m) in 56 seconds
- Power/mass: 0.1307 hp/lb (0.2149 kW/kg)

== See also ==
Related development

- Little Nellie 007
- Wallis WA-120

Aircraft of comparable role, configuration, and era

- Bensen B-8
- Brock KB-2
- Midwest Hornet
- Taggart GyroBee

Related lists

- List of rotorcraft
