= Ghost Stations =

Book by Bruce Barrymore Halpenny

GHOST STATIONS 1 book cover

Ghost Stations is a series of books by the British military historian Bruce Barrymore Halpenny, containing ostensibly true ghost and mystery stories generally connected to the RAF, airfields and other military or war connected stories.

== History ==
Bruce Halpenny had been writing ghost stories in the 1960s and encountering ghost stories in his exhaustive research into airfield histories, when he decided they should form the subject of a special book, and so started to add to and research his “ghost-mystery” files about abandoned airfields that "murmur and whisper with ghosts". Halpenny had by 1984 become acknowledged as a respected British military historian, expert in airfield histories, and expert in "RAF ghosts", especially surrounding airfields.

In the 1960s, Halpenny began presenting what he believed to be evidence of paranormal activity on airfields. He also campaigned for the British government to do their part by preserving a Second World War airfield in its original condition for future generations to see, and for the history of each airfield to be recorded fully and the men and sacrifice never forgotten.

Ghost Stations was officially launched at RAF Wittering on Thursday 16 October 1986. The book took 18 months to compile and drew upon the author's knowledge and experience working in airfields and documenting their history. Ghost Stations proved a best seller and was followed by a second book, entitled, Aaargh! that was published with over 30 "ghostly and mysterious" tales, one of which was "The eerie mystery of Lightning 894". Aaargh!, was later to become Ghost Stations 2 as six more books followed over the years.

GHOST STATIONS became a trademark in the late 1980s and in 2008 the new Ghost Stations series, based on the original series, was brought out. In the new series the stories had been shuffled around and merged, thus a story that was being investigated by Bruce Halpenny that was in several books in the old series, were merged into one story in one book in the new series. Also regional books were created in the new series, with Ghost Stations Lincolnshire, already for some Lincolnshire bookshops, one of their best sellers. The author's son, commercial artist, book editor and writer, Baron Barrymore Halpenny had a hand in the book cover design from the original series to the new series.

The author expresses his beliefs in the supernatural:

It is difficult for people to believe in ghosts and this is understandable for people tend to accept only what they can see and hear with their normal senses. Strange paranormal events take place, which seem to verge on fantasy, these events happen when we least expect them. It is not necessarily the bewitching hour of midnight, which animates ghosts; neither is it necessary for the location to be the hallowed ground of some ancient churchyard, or burial place. Ghosts and other phantoms can show up at any time, day or night, taking many forms.

— Bruce Barrymore Halpenny

== The original series of Ghost Stations books ==
The original eight Ghost Stations books were:

- Ghost Stations (Paperback) (ISBN 978-0-86303-314-8)
- Aaargh! (Paperback) – Later retitled Ghost Stations 2 (ISBN 978-0-907595-55-7)
- Ghost Stations 3 (Paperback) (ISBN 978-0-907595-57-1)
- Ghost Stations 4 (Paperback) (ISBN 978-0-907595-76-2)
- Ghost Stations 5 (Paperback) (ISBN 978-0-907595-81-6)
- Ghost Stations 6 (Paperback) (ISBN 978-0-907595-86-1)
- Ghost Stations 7 (Paperback) (ISBN 978-0-907595-97-7)
- Ghost Stations 8 (Paperback) (ISBN 978-1-900456-02-9)

== The new series of Ghost Stations books ==
The new Ghost Stations books (as of 2008), published by L'Aquila Publishing:

- Ghost Stations 1 (Paperback) (ISBN 978-1-871448-10-8)
- Ghost Stations 2 (Paperback) (ISBN 978-1-871448-11-5)
- Ghost Stations 3 (Paperback) (ISBN 978-1-871448-12-2)
- Ghost Stations 4 (Paperback) (ISBN 978-1-871448-13-9)
- Ghost Stations 5 (Paperback) (ISBN 978-1-871448-14-6)
- Ghost Stations Mysteries (Paperback) (ISBN 978-1-871448-08-5)
- Ghost Stations Lincolnshire (Paperback) (ISBN 978-1-871448-06-1)
- Ghost Stations Yorkshire (Paperback) (ISBN 978-1-871448-05-4)
- Ghost Stations Germany (Paperback) (ISBN 978-1-871448-07-8)
- Ghost Stations The Story (Paperback) (ISBN 978-1-871448-09-2)
