= Lorraine Chandler =

American singer (1946–2020)

- Born: Ermastine Lewis; April 29, 1946; Detroit, Michigan, U.S.
- Died: January 2, 2020 (aged 73) Detroit, Michigan, U.S.
- Genres: Soul
- Occupations: Singer, songwriter, arranger, record producer

Lorraine Chandler (born Ermastine Lewis, April 29, 1946 – January 2, 2020) was an American soul singer, songwriter and record producer.

== Life and career ==
She was born and raised in Detroit, Michigan, a neighbor of percussionist Eddie "Bongo" Brown and a family friend of Otis Williams of The Temptations. She attended Northern High School but left college to pursue a career in the music industry.

She began writing songs with Jack Ashford, including "I'm Gone", recorded by Eddie Parker, and "I'll Never Forget You", recorded by The O'Jays. She signed with Ashford's Pied Piper Productions as a songwriter and performer, and her first single "What Can I Do" was released in 1966, becoming a regional hit. It was released nationally by RCA, as was the follow-up "I Can't Hold On", which she co-wrote, but neither reached the national charts.

She was one of the first black female songwriters and producers. She continued to both record and write, many of her songs being released on the RCA and Kapp labels. In 1968, she and Ashford established the short-lived Ashford label, releasing Eddie Parker's "Love You Baby", later popular on Britain's Northern soul scene. When the company collapsed, she and Ashford continued to work together, writing Billy Sha-Rae's 1971 R&B chart hit "Do It". Ashford also co-wrote Baby Washington's 1974 hit "I've Got to Break Away", which reached no.32 on the R&B chart.

After Ashford moved to Los Angeles in 1976, Chandler remained in Detroit. In the mid-1980s, some of her unissued Pied Piper recordings were unearthed by British DJ and record label executive Ady Croasdell, who released several of them including a demo recording of a possible theme for the movie You Only Live Twice.

Chandler continued to work with Eddie Parker, singing on as well as arranging and producing his 1989 album The Old... The New... The Blues. She also returned to performing occasionally, both in Detroit and at Northern soul festivals in Britain. Many of her recordings were reissued on CD by Ace Records.

Lorraine Chandler died in Detroit on January 2, 2020, aged 73, from undisclosed causes.
