= You Only Live Twice (film) =

1967 film directed by Lewis Gilbert

- Theatrical release poster by Robert McGinnis and Frank McCarthy
- Directed by: Lewis Gilbert
- Screenplay by: Roald Dahl
- Additional story material by: Harold Jack Bloom
- Based on: You Only Live Twice by Ian Fleming
- Produced by: Harry Saltzman; Albert R. Broccoli
- Starring: Sean Connery
- Cinematography: Freddie Young
- Edited by: Peter R. Hunt
- Music by: John Barry
- Production company: Eon Productions Limited
- Distributed by: United Artists
- Release dates: 12 June 1967 (London, premiere); 13 June 1967 (United Kingdom and United States)
- Running time: 117 minutes
- Countries: United Kingdom; United States
- Languages: English; Japanese; Russian
- Budget: $9.5 million
- Box office: $111.6 million

You Only Live Twice is a 1967 spy film and the fifth film in the James Bond series produced by Eon Productions. The film's screenplay was written by Roald Dahl, and was loosely based on Ian Fleming's 1964 novel You Only Live Twice. It is the first of three Bond films to be directed by Lewis Gilbert, and is the first Bond film to discard most of Fleming's plot, using only a few characters and locations from the book as the background for an entirely new story.

You Only Live Twice stars Sean Connery as the fictional MI6 agent James Bond, who is dispatched to Japan after American and Soviet spacecraft vanish mysteriously, each nation blaming the other amidst the Cold War. Bond travels to a remote island to find the perpetrators, and comes face-to-face with Ernst Stavro Blofeld, the head of SPECTRE, an organisation that is working for the government of an unnamed Asian power, implied to be China, to provoke war between the United States and the Soviet Union. Although the character Blofeld played a role in previous films, You Only Live Twice is the first film to show his face.

During the filming in Japan, it was announced that Sean Connery would leave the role of Bond, but after one film's absence, he returned in 1971's Diamonds Are Forever and later in 1983's non-Eon Bond film Never Say Never Again. You Only Live Twice received positive reviews and grossed over $111 million (equivalent to $1.1 billion in 2025) in worldwide box office. However, it was the first Bond film to see a decline in box-office revenue, primarily owing to the oversaturation of the spy film genre from Bond imitators, including a competing Bond film, Casino Royale, from Columbia Pictures (1967). The series continued with On Her Majesty's Secret Service in 1969, the first official Bond film without Connery in the lead role.

== Plot ==
American NASA spacecraft Jupiter 16 is hijacked from orbit by an unidentified spaceship. The United States suspects the Soviet Union, but the British suspect Japanese involvement since the spacecraft landed in the Sea of Japan. To investigate, MI6 operative James Bond is sent to Tokyo, after faking his own death in Hong Kong and being buried at sea from HMS Tenby.

While attending a sumo tournament, Bond is approached by Japanese secret service agent Aki. She takes him to meet local MI6 operative Dikko Henderson who claims to have critical evidence about the spacecraft, but a hitman kills him before he can elaborate. Bond kills the assailant, taking his clothing as a disguise, and is driven in the getaway car to Osato Chemicals. Once there, he subdues the driver and breaks into the office safe of the company's president, Mr. Osato. After obtaining secret documents, Bond is pursued by security and rescued by Aki, who flees to a secluded subway station. Bond chases her, but falls through a trap door leading to the office of the head of the Japanese secret service, Tiger Tanaka. The documents include a photograph of the cargo ship Ning-Po, with a microdot message saying the tourist who took the photo was killed as a security precaution.

Bond, masquerading as a potential buyer, returns to Osato Chemicals. He briefly meets with Osato, who orders his secretary, Helga Brandt, to kill him; both are SPECTRE agents. Once outside, assassins open fire on Bond before Aki rescues him. They drive to Kobe, where Ning-Po is docked. They learn that the ship was delivering elements for rocket fuel. After being discovered, Bond eludes the henchmen while Aki escapes. He is captured and awakens in Brandt's cabin on Ning-Po. Brandt interrogates before seducing him then flies him to Tokyo the next day, but en route she sets off a flare inside the plane, seals him in his seat, and bails out. Bond manages to land the plane and flees before it explodes.

Bond discovers where Ning-Po unloaded. He flies over the area in an armed autogyro created by Q. Near a volcano, Bond is attacked by and destroys four helicopters, confirming his suspicions of a nearby base. A Soviet spacecraft is captured in orbit by another unidentified craft, heightening tensions with the United States. The mysterious spaceship lands in a base hidden inside the volcano, operated by Ernst Stavro Blofeld of SPECTRE, who has been hired by an unnamed great power to start a Soviet-American war. Blofeld summons Osato and Brandt to his quarters for not having killed Bond; Osato blames Brandt, and Blofeld drops her into a pool filled with piranhas.

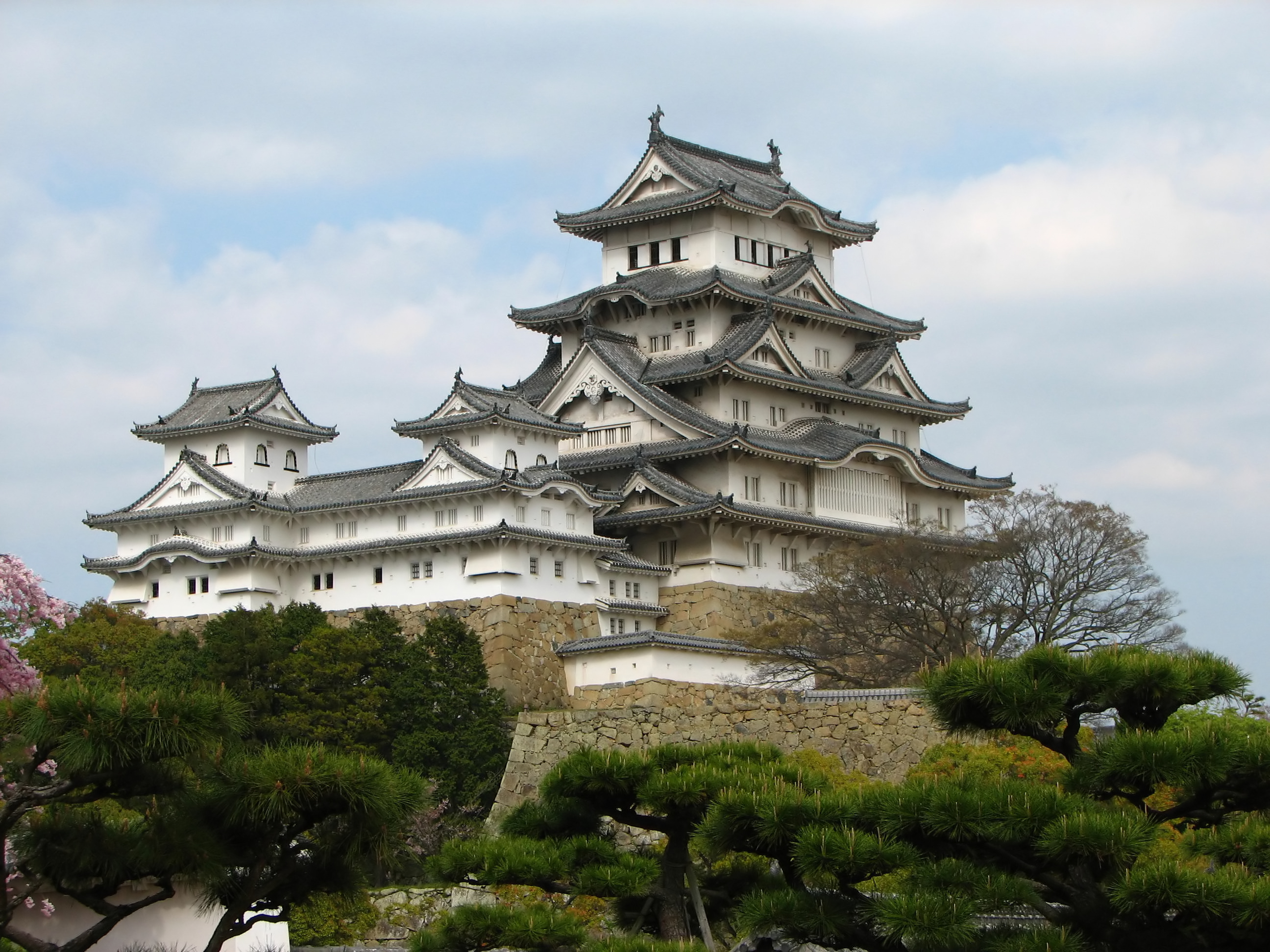
The Himeji Castle, location of the ninjas' training.

In Kyoto, Bond prepares to conduct a closer investigation of the island by training with Tanaka's ninjas and donning a Japanese disguise, which will include a staged marriage to an Ama diver, performed by an agent known on the island. While still in Kyoto, Aki is killed when she is poisoned in her sleep by a SPECTRE agent targeting Bond, who is asleep next to her.

Bond is introduced to Tanaka's student, Kissy Suzuki, who will perform the role of his wife. Acting on a lead, the pair reconnoitre a cave booby-trapped with phosgene gas, which leads to the volcano with the secret rocket base. Bond slips inside while Kissy goes to alert Tanaka. He locates and frees the captured American and Soviet astronauts and, with their help, steals a space suit to infiltrate the SPECTRE spacecraft, Bird One. However, Blofeld spots and detains him while Bird One is launched. He is taken into the control room, where he meets Blofeld.

Bird One closes in on an American space capsule, and U.S. forces prepare to launch a nuclear attack on the Soviet Union. Meanwhile, Tanaka's ninjas approach the base's entrance, but are detected and fired upon. Bond distracts Blofeld and lets in the ninjas. Blofeld kills Osato for his failure to eliminate Bond and prepares to execute him as well, but is stopped by Tanaka and flees. Bond fights his way back to the control room, kills Blofeld's bodyguard Hans, and activates Bird One's self-destruct before it reaches the American capsule. As the Americans stand down their forces, Blofeld activates the base's self-destruct system and escapes. Bond, Kissy, Tanaka, and the surviving ninjas leave before the eruption destroys the base, and are picked up by the Japan Maritime Self-Defense Force and the British Secret Service.

== Cast ==
The sets of Blofeld's hideout at Pinewood Studios. From left, Lois Maxwell, Akiko Wakabayashi, Sean Connery, Karin Dor and Mie Hama examine the set during a break in filming. Spacecraft Bird One is in the background.

- Sean Connery as James Bond, an MI6 agent
- Akiko Wakabayashi as Aki, an agent with the Japanese secret service who assists Bond
- Tetsurō Tamba as Tiger Tanaka, head of Japanese secret service (voice dubbed by Robert Rietty).
- Mie Hama as Kissy Suzuki, an ama girl agent who marries Bond as an undercover ploy; she is never referred to by name (voice dubbed by Nikki van der Zyl (uncredited))
- Teru Shimada as Mr. Osato, a Japanese industrialist secretly affiliated to SPECTRE
- Karin Dor as Helga Brandt/No. 11, a SPECTRE assassin
- Lois Maxwell as Miss Moneypenny, M's secretary
- Desmond Llewelyn as Q, head of MI6 technical department
- Charles Gray as Dikko Henderson, British contact living in Japan. Gray would later play Blofeld in Diamonds Are Forever, also opposite Sean Connery.
- Bernard Lee as M, the head of MI6
- Donald Pleasence as Ernst Stavro Blofeld, the megalomaniacal head of the terrorist syndicate known as SPECTRE

== Production ==
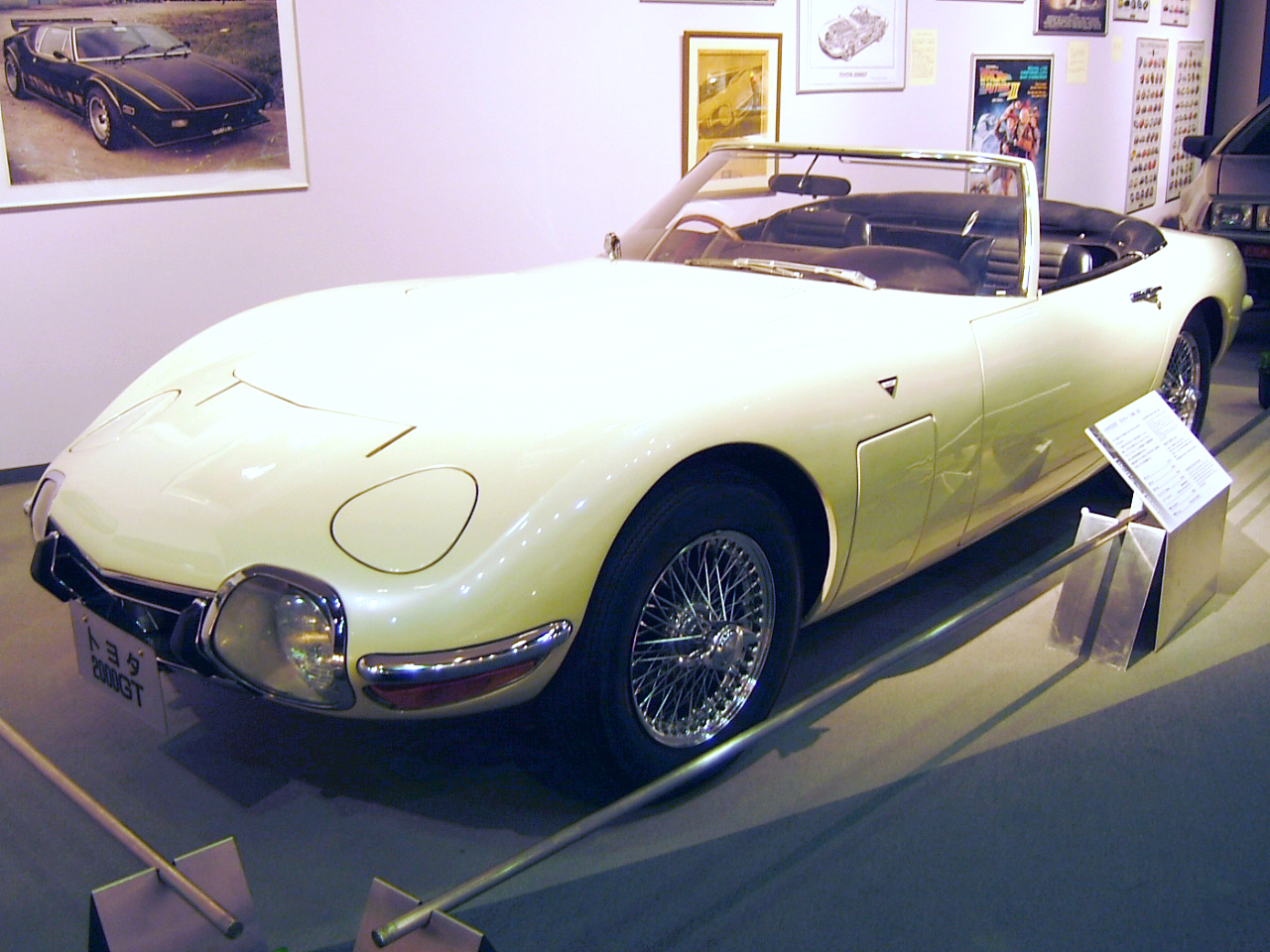
Aki's Toyota 2000GT Open-Top was ranked by Complex in 2011 as the seventh-best car in the James Bond series.

On Her Majesty's Secret Service was the intended next film after Thunderball (1965), but the producers decided to adapt You Only Live Twice instead because OHMSS would require searching for high and snowy locations. Lewis Gilbert originally declined the offer to direct, but accepted after producer Albert R. Broccoli called him saying: "You can't give up this job. It's the largest audience in the world." Peter R. Hunt, who edited the first five Bond films, recalled that the producers had contracts with several directors, and Gilbert was simply assigned to the film. Ted Moore, the director of photography on the first four films, was unavailable because he was filming A Man for All Seasons and was replaced by Freddie Young.

Gilbert, Young, producers Broccoli and Harry Saltzman, and production designer Ken Adam then went to Japan, spending three weeks searching for locations. SPECTRE's shore fortress headquarters was changed to an extinct volcano after the team learned that the Japanese do not build castles by the sea. The group was due to return to the UK on a BOAC Boeing 707 flight (BOAC Flight 911) on 5 March 1966, but cancelled after being told they had a chance to watch a ninja demonstration. That flight crashed 25 minutes after takeoff, killing all on board. In Tokyo, the crew also found Hunt, who decided to go on holiday after having his request to direct declined. Hunt was invited to direct the second unit for You Only Live Twice and accepted the job.

Unlike most James Bond films, which usually feature various locations around the world, almost the entire film is set in one country, and several minutes are devoted to an elaborate Japanese wedding. This is in keeping with Fleming's original novel, which also devoted a number of pages to the discussion of Japanese culture. Toho Studios provided soundstages, personnel, and the female Japanese stars to the producers.

=== Writing ===
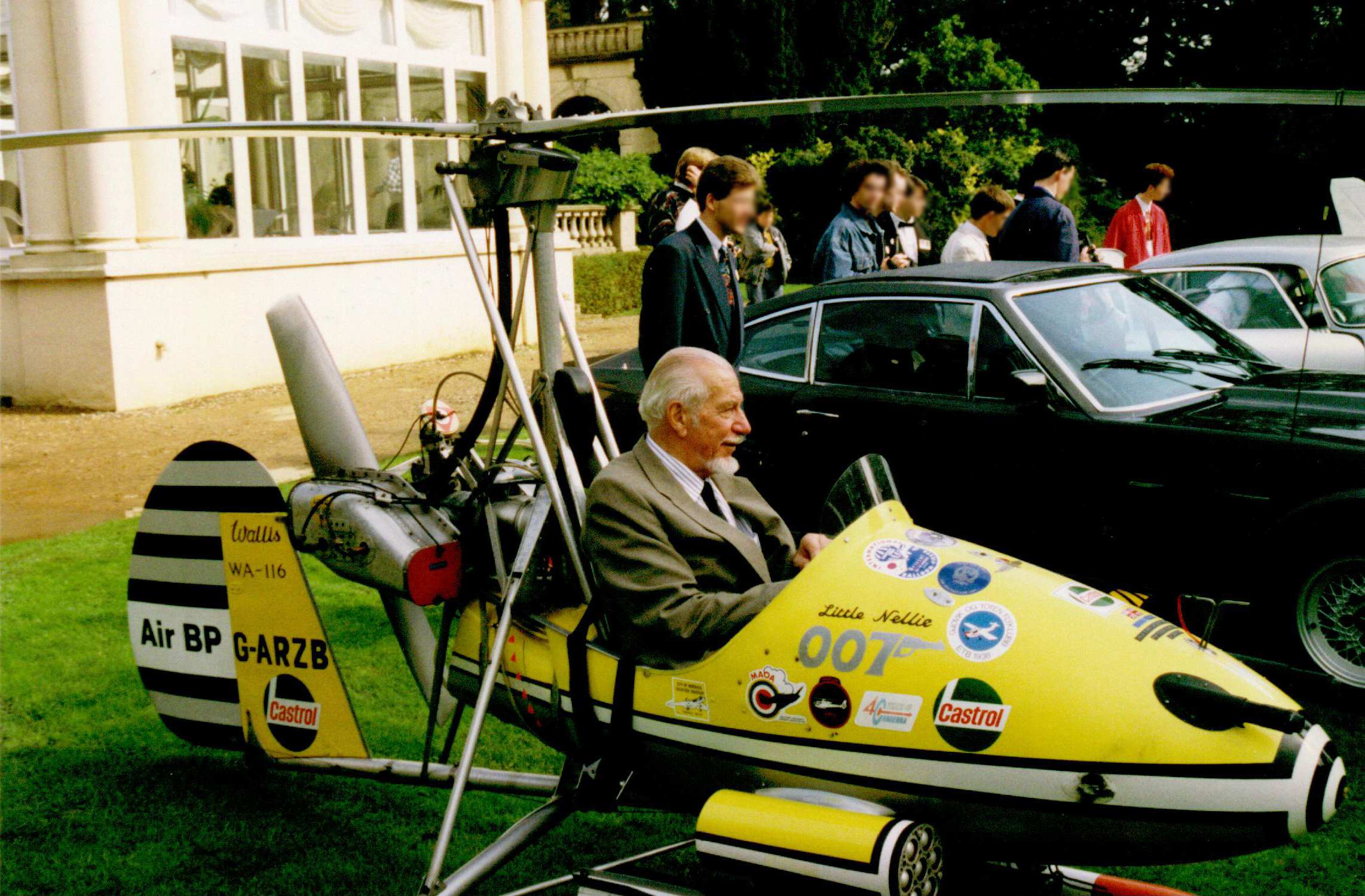
The Little Nellie WA-116 autogyro with its constructor and pilot, Ken Wallis

The first draft was written by Sydney Boehm based closely on the original novel. The producers had Harold Jack Bloom come to Japan with them to write a screenplay. His work was ultimately rejected, but since several of his ideas were used in the final script, he was given the credit of "Additional Story Material". Among these elements were the opening with Bond's fake death and burial at sea, and the ninja attack. As the screenwriter of the previous Bond films, Richard Maibaum, was unavailable, Roald Dahl (a close friend of Ian Fleming) was chosen to write the adaptation, despite having no prior experience writing a screenplay except for the uncompleted The Bells of Hell Go Ting-a-ling-a-ling.

Dahl said that the original novel was "Fleming's worst book, with no plot in it which would even make a movie", and compared it to a travelogue, stating that he had to create a new plot though "I could retain only four or five of the original story's ideas." On creating the plot, Dahl said he "did not know what the hell Bond was going to do" despite having to deliver the first draft in six weeks, and decided to do a basic plot similar to Dr. No. He was inspired by the story of a missing nuclear-armed U.S. Air Force bomber over Spain and by the Soviet Union and the United States' recent first spacewalks from Voskhod 2 and Gemini 4. Dahl was given a free rein on his script, except for the character of Bond and "the girl formula", involving three women for Bond to seduce – an ally and a henchwoman who both get killed, and the main Bond girl. While the third involved a character from the book, Kissy Suzuki, Dahl had to create Aki and Helga Brandt to fulfil the rest.

Gilbert was mostly collaborative with Dahl's work, as the writer declared: "He not only helped in script conferences, but had some good ideas and then left you alone, and when you produced the finished thing, he shot it. Other directors have such an ego that they want to rewrite it and put their own dialogue in, and it's usually disastrous. What I admired so much about Lewis Gilbert was that he just took the screenplay and shot it. That's the way to direct: You either trust your writer or you don't."

=== Casting ===
Jan Werich as Blofeld

When the time came to begin You Only Live Twice, the producers were faced with the problem of a disenchanted star. Sean Connery had stated that he was tired of playing James Bond and all of the associated commitment (time spent filming and publicising each movie), together with finding it difficult to do other work, which would potentially lead to typecasting. Saltzman and Broccoli were able to persuade Connery by increasing his fee for the film, but geared up to look for a replacement.

Jan Werich was originally cast by producer Harry Saltzman to play Blofeld. Upon his arrival at the Pinewood set, both producer Albert R. Broccoli and director Lewis Gilbert felt that he was a poor choice, resembling a "poor, benevolent Father Christmas". Nonetheless, in an attempt to make the casting work, Gilbert continued filming. After several days, both Gilbert and Broccoli determined that Werich was not menacing enough, and recast Blofeld with Donald Pleasence in the role. Pleasence's ideas for Blofeld's appearance included a hump, a limp, a beard, and a lame hand, before he settled on the scar. He found it uncomfortable, though, because of the glue that attached it to his eye. Helmut Qualtinger was also considered for the role of Blofeld.

Many European models were tested for Helga Brandt, including German actress Eva Renzi who passed on the film, with German actress Karin Dor being cast. Dor performed the stunt of falling into a pool to depict Helga's demise, without the use of a double. Dor was dubbed by a different actress for the German release.

Actress Tsai Chin played Ling, the Bond Girl who helped fake Bond's death. She would appear as Madame Wu in the 2006 James Bond thriller Casino Royale.

UA CEO Bud Ornstein met with Toshiro Mifune in the Canary Islands to try to convince him to play Tiger Tanaka, but he was already committed to appear in Grand Prix. Gilbert had chosen Tetsurō Tamba after working with him in The 7th Dawn. A number of martial arts experts were hired as the ninjas. The two Japanese female parts proved difficult to cast, due to most of the actresses tested having little English. Akiko Wakabayashi and Mie Hama, both Toho Studios stars, were eventually chosen and started taking English classes in the UK. Hama, initially cast in the role of Tanaka's assistant, had difficulty with the language. Initially the producers were going to fire her, but after Tamba suggested she would commit suicide if they did so instead switched her role with Wakabayashi, who had been cast as Kissy, a part with less dialogue. Wakabayashi only requested that her character name, "Suki", be changed to "Aki".

=== Filming ===
Filming of You Only Live Twice lasted from July 1966 to March 1967.

The film was shot primarily in Japan, and most of the locations are identifiable.

In summary:

James Bond's Japan in You Only Live Twice

- Tokyo: After arriving in Japan at Akime, Bond goes to Tokyo. The initial scenes are set in and around the Ginza area. The Hotel New Otani Tokyo served as the outside for Osato Chemicals, and the hotel's gardens were used for scenes of the ninja training. A car chase using the Toyota 2000GT and a Toyota Crown was largely filmed in the area around the Olympic Stadium used previously for the 1964 Summer Olympics. Tokyo Tower and the centre of Tokyo can be briefly seen in a sequence where the villains' car is dropped in Tokyo Bay. Tanaka's private subway station was filmed at the Tokyo Metro's Nakano-shimbashi Station. A sumo wrestling match was filmed at Tokyo's sumo hall, the Kuramae Kokugikan; this has since been demolished.
- Kobe Docks appears in a sequence when Bond investigates the ship Ning-Po, and is involved in a fight.
- Bond's wedding at a Shinto shrine was filmed in Nachi.
- Himeji Castle in Hyōgo Prefecture was depicted as Tanaka's ninja training camp.
- The village of Bonotsucho Akime was where Bond and his Ama wife lived and where the Ama scenes were shot.
- The ryokan Shigetomi-so (now known as Shimazu Shigetomisoh Manor) was used as the exterior of Tanaka's house.
- Kagoshima Prefecture was the location for various scenes depicting Little Nellie.
- Mount Shinmoe-dake in Kyūshū was used for the exteriors of SPECTRE's headquarters.

Most of the interiors were shot at Pinewood. The opening sequence in Hong Kong used some location footage of a street in Kowloon. Hong Kong's Victoria Harbour is also shown, but the at-sea burial of Bond and the retrieval of the corpse was filmed off Gibraltar and the Bahamas. The scenes with the light aircraft ferrying Bond to his supposed death were shot over very English-looking countryside in Buckinghamshire, whereas this was supposed to be Japan.

Large crowds were present in Japan to see the shooting. A Japanese fan began following Sean Connery with a camera, and police had to deal with fan incursions several times during shooting.

The heavily armed WA-116 autogyro "Little Nellie" was included after Ken Adam heard a radio interview with its inventor, RAF Wing Commander Ken Wallis. Little Nellie was named after music hall star Nellie Wallace, who has a similar surname to its inventor. Wallis piloted his invention, which was equipped with various mock-up armaments by John Stears' special effects team, during production.

"Nellie"'s battle with helicopters proved to be difficult to film. The scenes were initially shot in Miyazaki, first with takes of the gyrocopter, with more than 85 take-offs, five hours of flight and Wallis nearly crashing into the camera several times. A scene filming the helicopters from above created a major downdraft, and cameraman John Jordan's foot was severed by the craft's rotor. It was surgically reattached by surgeons visiting the country, and then amputated in London when the surgery was deemed to have been flawed. Jordan would continue work for the Bond series with a prosthetic foot. The concluding shots involved explosions, which the Japanese government did not allow in a national park; hence, the crew moved to Torremolinos, Spain, which was found to resemble the Japanese landscape. The shots of the volcano were filmed at Shinmoedake on Kyushu Island.

The sets of SPECTRE's volcano base, including operative heliport and monorail, were constructed at a lot inside Pinewood Studios, at a cost of $1 million. The 45 m (148 ft) tall set could be seen from 5 kilometres (3 miles) away, and attracted many people from the region. Locations outside Japan included using the Royal Navy frigate HMS Tenby, then in Gibraltar, for the sea burial, Hong Kong for the scene where Bond fakes his death, and Norway for the Soviet radar station.

Sean Connery's then-wife Diane Cilento performed the swimming scenes for at least five Japanese actresses, including Mie Hama. Martial arts expert Donn F. Draeger provided martial arts training, and also doubled for Connery. Lewis Gilbert's regular editor, Thelma Connell, was originally hired to edit the film. However, after her initial, almost three-hour cut received a terrible response from test audiences, Peter R. Hunt was asked to re-edit the film. Hunt's cut proved a much greater success, and he was awarded the director's chair on the next film as a result.

=== Music ===
The soundtrack was the fourth of the series to be composed by John Barry. He tried to incorporate the "elegance of the Oriental sound" with Japanese music-inspired tracks. The theme song, "You Only Live Twice", was composed by Barry and lyricist Leslie Bricusse, and sung by Nancy Sinatra after her father Frank Sinatra passed on the opportunity. Nancy Sinatra was reported to be very nervous while recording – first she wanted to leave the studio; then she claimed to sometimes "sound like Minnie Mouse". Barry declared that the final song uses 25 different takes.

There are two versions of the song "You Only Live Twice", sung by Nancy Sinatra, one directly from the movie soundtrack, and a second one for record release arranged by Billy Strange. The movie soundtrack song is widely recognised for its striking opening bars and oriental flavour, and was far more popular on radio. The record release reached No. 44 on the Billboard charts in the US, and No. 11 in the UK. Both versions of the title song are available on CD.

A different title song was originally recorded by Julie Rogers, but eventually discarded. Only two lines from that version were kept in the final lyrics, and the orchestral part was changed to fit Sinatra's vocal range. Rogers' version only appeared in a James Bond 30th Anniversary CD, with no singer credit. In the 1990s, an alternative example of a possible theme song (also called "You Only Live Twice" and sung by Lorraine Chandler) was discovered in the vaults of RCA Records. It became a very popular track with followers of the Northern soul scene (Chandler was well known for her high-quality soul output on RCA) and can be found on several RCA soul compilations.

== Promotion ==
Original theatrical trailer for You Only Live Twice.

To promote the film, United Artists Television produced a one-hour colour television programme titled Welcome to Japan, Mr. Bond, which first aired on 2 June 1967 in the United States on NBC. Bond regulars Lois Maxwell and Desmond Llewelyn appeared, playing respectively Miss Moneypenny and Q. Kate O'Mara appears as Miss Moneypenny's assistant. The programme shows clips from You Only Live Twice and the then four existing Bond films, and contained a storyline of Moneypenny trying to establish the identity of Bond's bride.

== Release and reception ==
You Only Live Twice premiered at the Odeon Leicester Square in London on 12 June 1967, with Queen Elizabeth II in attendance. The film opened the following day in the United Kingdom and United States, set an opening day record at the Odeon Leicester Square, and went to number one in the United States with a weekend gross of $600,000. It grossed $7 million from 161 theatres in the United States in its first three weeks, and was number one for seven weeks. The film grossed $43 million in the United States and over $68 million worldwide.

Apart from the film reception, the title sequence of the film received praise with critic Pauline Kael mentioning that it had an unexpected element, that of "finding death in space lyrical."

=== Contemporary reviews ===
Roger Ebert of the Chicago Sun-Times awarded the film two-and-a-half stars out of four, in which he criticised the focus on gadgets, declaring "the formula fails to work its magic. Like its predecessor Thunderball, another below-par entry, this one is top-heavy with gadgets but weak on plotting and getting everything to work at the same time." Bosley Crowther, reviewing for The New York Times, felt "there's enough of the bright and bland bravado of the popular British super-sleuth mixed into this melee of rocket-launching to make it a bag of good Bond fun. And there's so much of that scientific clatter – so much warring of super-capsules out in space and fussing with electronic gadgets in a great secret underground launching pad – that this way out adventure picture should be the joy and delight of the youngsters and give pleasure to the reasonable adults who can find release in the majestically absurd." Charles Champlin of the Los Angeles Times wrote the film was "a fast, funny, no-holds-barred piece of outrageous nonsense."

Variety stated more positively: "As entertainment [You Only Live Twice] compares favourably in quality and is replete with as many fights, gadgets, and beauties as its predecessors". Time magazine was sharply critical of the film, claiming the franchise had become "the victim of the same misfortune that once befell Frankenstein: there have been so many flamboyant imitations that the original looks like a copy." The review later derided that "the effects are ineffective. The outer-space sequences would be more appropriate in a grade school educational short entitled Our Amazing Universe, and the volcanic climax is a series of clumsy process shots that no one took the trouble to fix. Even Connery seems uncomfortable and fatigued..." Clifford Terry of the Chicago Tribune remarked that "a large percentage of You Only Live Twice is disappointing, lacking the wit and zip, the pacing and punch, of its predecessors, especially the first three. Roald Dahl's script is larded with sex-slanted jokes that are either pathetically feeble or sophomorically coarse, Bond's patented puns are punier and even Connery's enthusiasm for his shrewd, suave, and sensual character seems to have waned."

=== Retrospective reviews ===
On the review aggregation website Rotten Tomatoes, the film holds an approval rating of 73% based on 52 reviews with an average rating of 6.71/10. The website's critical consensus reads, "With exotic locales, impressive special effects, and a worthy central villain, You Only Live Twice overcomes a messy and implausible story to deliver another memorable early Bond flick." James Berardinelli of ReelViews said that the first half was good, but "It's only during the second half, as the plot escalates beyond the bounds of preposterousness, that the film starts to fragment", criticising Blofeld's appearance and stating "rockets that swallow up spacecraft are a bit too extravagant." Ali Barclay of BBC Films lightly criticized Dahl's script, writing that Dahl had "clearly helped thrust Bond into a whole new world of villainy and technology, maybe his concepts were slightly ahead of themselves, or maybe he just tried too hard." Leo Goldsmith lauded the volcano base as "the most impressive of Ken Adam's sets for the franchise." Danny Peary wrote that You Only Live Twice "should have been about twenty minutes shorter" and described it as "not a bad Bond film, but it doesn't compare to its predecessors – the formula had become a little stale."

Jim Smith and Stephen Lavington, in their 2002 retrospective, Bond Films, judged Ken Adam's production design "astonishing". They conclude: "You Only Live Twice is a loving tribute to the idea that nothing succeeds like excess. ... It's more Fleming pastiche than actual Fleming, with elements of previous Eon Bond films sprinkled through a mechanical (yet inspired) screenplay. ... This is pop art, delivered with punch and panache."

IGN ranked You Only Live Twice as the fourth-best Bond film, and Entertainment Weekly as the second-best, considering that it "pushes the series to the outer edge of coolness". However, Norman Wilner of MSN chose it as the fifth-worst, criticising the plot, action scenes and lack of screentime for Blofeld. Literary critic Paul Simpson called the film one of the most colourful of the series and credited the prefecture of Kagoshima for adding "a good flavour" of Japanese influence on the film, but he panned the depiction of Blofeld as a "let-down", "small, bald and a whooping scar". Simon Winder said that the film is "perfect" for parodies of the series. John Brosnan, in his book James Bond in the Cinema, compared the film to an episode of Thunderbirds due to its reliance on gadgetry, but he admitted it had pace and spectacle. Christopher Null considered the film to be one of James Bond's most memorable adventures but that the plot was "protracting and quite confusing".

The film is recognised by the American Film Institute in these lists:

- 2003: AFI's 100 Years...100 Heroes & Villains:
  - Ernst Stavro Blofeld – Nominated Villain

== See also ==
- Outline of James Bond
