= Marion Rose Halpenny =

Marion Rose Halpenny is an equestrian writer and horsewoman, born in Lincoln, Lincolnshire, and known as the Lincolnshire turf authoress. She has written a number of articles and books on racing, but is mainly known for her pioneering book British Racing and Racecourses, which was the first book of its kind and raised interest due to the author being a woman, which was still in 1960s/70s a male dominated area. The book is a detailed list of all the racecourses in the British Isles along with illustrations and guides to each racecourse and its track surface. This exhaustive work had not been done before.

In preparing the information for British Racing and Racecourses, she visited 60 of the 62 courses dealt with in the book (all but Ayr and Perth) and used a lot of the information she gleaned as a horsewoman and racehorse owner. She knew from personal experience that horses with low numbers in the draw are at a considerable disadvantage at Edinburgh. One of the highlights while she was an owner came on this course when her horse Calm Palm was drawn on the inside and although he was badly bumped by the other horses on the courses slight elbow, he valiantly came from behind to finish second.

In the mid-1980s, she was still involved with racehorses and a project helping ordinary people to become involved in the sport of Kings.

She is married to the British military historian Bruce Barrymore Halpenny. They have a son, commercial artist and writer Baron Barrymore Halpenny.
