= British Racing and Racecourses =

1971 non-fiction book about racecourses

- Author: M. R. Halpenny
- Publication date: 1971

British Racing and Racecourses (ISBN 978-0950139722) published in 1971 with a first print run of 10,000, was written by the female equestrian writer, Marion Rose Halpenny, and was the first book with general all round racecourse information, precise definitions of terms used to describe track surfaces, with plans of all racecourses that had broken completely new ground.

== Ground breaking ==
The book, that was a major five-year project, was at its time, ground breaking, not only in that it was the first book to have ever been compiled listing all the racecourse of Great Britain along with a plan of each, but that it had been done by a woman on her own, which in the racing world, especially the Jockey Club, was still very much male dominated and opposed in many areas to the introduction of women into the sport, let alone writing about it, but it was the first gazetteer of its kind for British racing.

== Royal letters ==
The book was well received by both the Queen and especially the Queen Mother, who both wrote letters expressing their pleasure at receiving copies. The Queen mother's letter showed she had read it and enjoyed it greatly.

== The start ==
The idea for the book came in 1966, when Marion Halpenny was at a race meeting and heard one woman asking another why a certain horse was wearing a nose band, it occurred to her at the time that the majority of people going to meetings knew very little about the details of racing and she thought it wouldn't be a bad idea to put all the information together in a book. So began the task of collecting the necessary information, sifting through it, selecting items and preparing them for the book. She did all this without knowing it would ever be published and was pleasantly surprised when the first publisher she sent the manuscript to accepted it straight away.

Though met favourably by the media, who liked the lone woman against the establishment angle, male chauvinists in the racing world were lukewarm and a series of copy cat books, written by men, were quickly published afterwards. The diagrams of the tracks of the racecourses, which were an innovation of Marion Halpenny, were also quickly copied by newspapers and other publications and are still often used and seen in publications today. All came from the book British Racing and Racecourses.
