= Wolf Preservation Foundation =

International non-profit organisation

The Wolf Preservation Foundation (WPF) is an international non-profit organization dedicated to advocating on behalf of the wolf (Canis lupus). It endeavours to provide world leaders, such as the Council of Europe, members of the European Parliament, and political parties with information on the status, management, and preservation needs of the wolf on the world stage.

The organization's founder and president is military historian and author Bruce Barrymore Halpenny. Its patron is Wing Commander Kenneth Horatio Wallis, MBE.

== Organization's goals ==
The organization says that the wolf plays an important role in the regulation and natural selection of the populations of small and large mammals. It claims that deaths of sheep attributed to wolves can instead be attributed to feral dogs. The organization endeavours to change the attitudes of people towards the wolf, especially in Europe where wolf populations are sparse.

Goals of the Wolf Preservation Foundation include:

- Stop the killing of wolves and see that countries implement strict legal protection for wolves that migrate from neighbouring countries; press for legalization to require the registration of each wolf killed and, to state: how, where, why and by whom.
- See that countries who have signed at the Berne Convention carryout what they have signed to do regarding the wolf.
- See that the WPF preservation and management policies are carried out and study the possibility to restore wolves as natural predators into what was once their native habitat.
- To demythologise and promote a better understanding of the wolf.
- See that controls are put on feral dogs in order to stop the spread of disease and interbreeding with wolves, for there is a possibility they will wipe out the grey wolf, unless urgent action is taken.

== Publications ==
The organization's president Bruce Barrymore Halpenny has authored two books on wolves, published by the organization:

- Brother Wolf, Wolf Preservation Foundation, 1994. ISBN 978-0-9524959-8-7.
- Ways of the Wolf, Wolf Preservation Foundation, 2011. ISBN 978-0952495956.

== See also ==
- Animal welfare
- Grey wolf
