= Reymerston Hall =

Building in Garvestone, Norfolk, England

Coordinates: 52.6212°N 0.9733°E

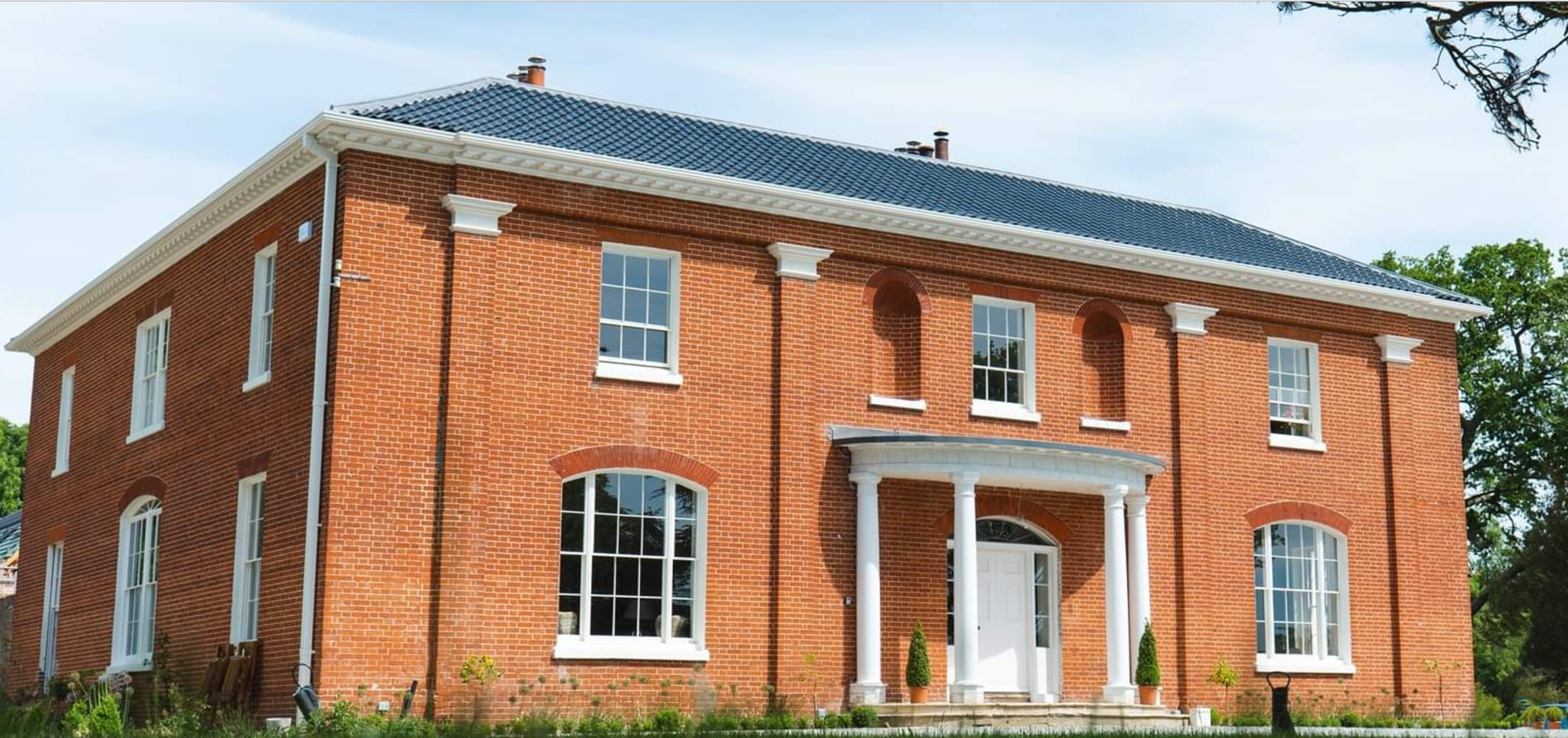
Reymerston Hall in 2021

Reymerston Hall is a listed Georgian house in Norfolk, England. It is a Georgian building listed as Grade II on the English Heritage Register. It was built in the 1700s by a wealthy landowning family.

== Owners ==
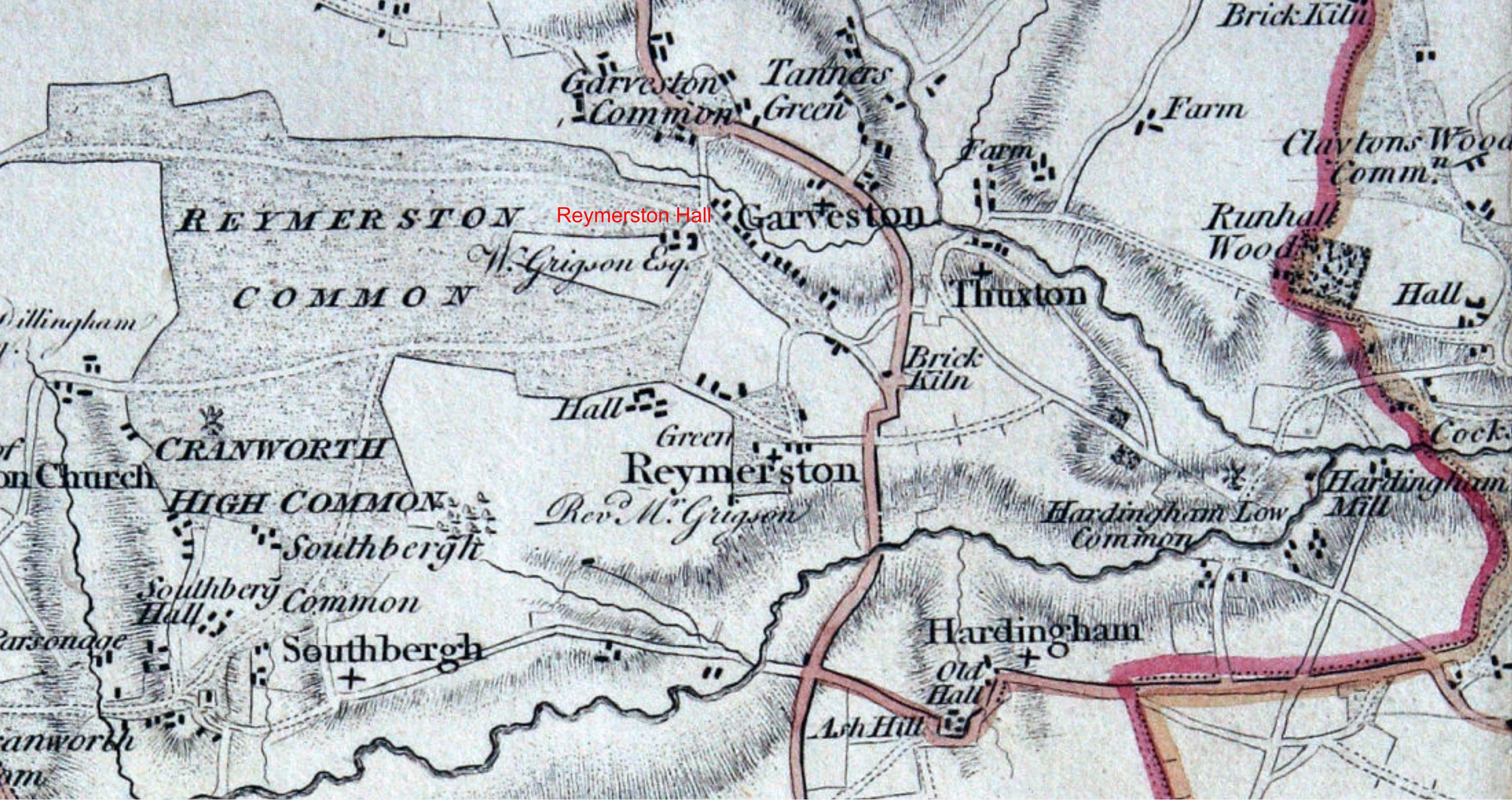
Map of Reymerston in 1797

Faden's Map of 1797 shows that the house was owned at the time by William Grigson (1755–1807) who was a cleric. He came from a wealthy family which had owned land in Reymerston for many years. When Thomas died in 1784 William inherited his property, including Reymerston Hall. William did not marry and had no direct heirs so when he died in 1807 he left some of his property, including Reymerston Hall, to the Reverend Thomas Mann, who did not live at the house and for much of the time it was rented out. Thomas Mann was a bachelor and when he died in 1847 he left Reymerston Hall to George Latham Press,

== Today ==
As of 2022 the hall is used as a wedding venue.
