= Nancy Sinatra discography =

This article presents the discography of American pop singer Nancy Sinatra.

== Albums ==
=== Studio albums ===
Year	Album details	Peak positions		Certifications (sales threshold)
Year	Album details	US	UK	Certifications (sales threshold)
1966	Boots: Released: March 15, 1966; Label: Reprise Records, Sundazed Music (1995 reissue), Light in the Attic Records (2021 reissue)	5	12	US: Gold
1966	How Does That Grab You?: Released: 1966; Label: Reprise Records	41	17	
1966	Nancy in London: Released: 1966; Label: Reprise Records	122	—	
1967	Country, My Way: Released: August 13, 1967; Label: Reprise Records	43	—	
1967	Sugar: Released: February 1, 1967; Label: Reprise Records	18	—	
1969	Nancy: Released: 1969; Label: Reprise Records	91	—	
1972	Woman: Released: 1972; Label: RCA Victor	—	—	
1995	One More Time: Released: April 11, 1995; Label: Boots Enterprises / Cougar Records / Warlock Records	—	—	
1998	Sheet Music: Released: June 9, 1998; Label: Boots Enterprises / DCC Compact Classics	—	—	
1998	For My Dad: Released: July 14, 1998; Label: Boots Enterprises / DCC Compact Classics; 3-song extended play (EP)	—	—	
1999	How Does It Feel?: Released: March 16, 1999; Label: Boots Enterprises / DCC Compact Classics	—	—	
2002	California Girl: Released: April 30, 2002; Label: Boots Enterprises / Buena Vista	—	—	
2004	Nancy Sinatra: Released: September 28, 2004; Label: Boots Enterprises / Attack Records / Sanctuary Records Group	—	94	
2013	Shifting Gears: Released: December 3, 2013; Label: Boots Enterprises	—	—	
'—' denotes releases that did not chart or were not released in that territory.

=== Soundtracks ===
Year	Album details	Peak positions
Year	Album details	US
1967	Movin' with Nancy: Released: 1967; Label: Reprise Records	37

=== Collaborations ===
Year	Album details	Peak positions		Certifications (sales threshold)
Year	Album details	US	US Country	Certifications (sales threshold)
1968	Nancy & Lee (with Lee Hazlewood): Released: 1968; Label: Reprise Records (LP), Boots Enterprises (Digital)	13	—	US: Gold
1968	The Sinatra Family Wish You a Merry Christmas (with Frank Sinatra, Frank Sinatra, Jr., and Tina Sinatra): Released: 1969; Label: Reprise (LP), Artanis Entertainment Group/DCC Compact Classics (CD), Frank Sinatra Enterprises (Digital)	—	—	
1972	Nancy & Lee Again (with Lee Hazlewood): Released: 1972; Label: RCA, Boots Enterprises (Digital)	—	—	
1981	Mel and Nancy (with Mel Tillis): Released: 1981; Label: Elektra (LP)	—	56	
2004	Nancy & Lee 3 (with Lee Hazlewood): Released: 2004; Compact disc only released in Australia.; Label: Boots Enterprises (Digital) / Boots Enterprises/Warner Music Australia (CD)	—	—	
"—" denotes releases that did not chart or were not released in that territory

=== Compilation albums ===
Year	Album details	Peak positions	
Year	Album details	US	DEN
1970	Nancy's Greatest Hits: Released: 1970; Label: Reprise; Subtitled "With a Little Help from Her Friends"	99	—
1972	This Is Nancy Sinatra: Released: 1972; Label: RCA Victor	—	—
1986	Boots: Nancy Sinatra's All-Time Hits: Released: 1986; Label: Rhino; LP and cassette only	—	—
1987	The Hit Years: Released: 1987; Label: Rhino; CD only	—	—
1989	Fairy Tales and Fantasies: The Best of Nancy and Lee (with Lee Hazlewood): Released: 1989; Label: Rhino	—	—
1994	Lightning's Girl: 24 Tracks: Released: September 4, 1994; Label: Raven; Australian release	—	—
1999	Walking: Released: 1999; Label: Bell (Germany)	—	—
1999	You Go-Go Girl: Released: November 16, 1999; Label: Varèse Sarabande; Contains previously unreleased material	—	—
2001	The Very Best of Nancy Sinatra: 24 Great Songs: Released: 2001; Label: Amigo (Sweden)	—	—
2001	Something Stupid: Worldwide Hits: Released: 2001; Label: BMG Germany	—	—
2002	The Greatest Hits of Nancy Sinatra: Released: 2002; Label: Traditional Line (Europe)	—	—
2002	Lightning's Girl: Greatest Hits 1965–1971: Released: August 13, 2002; Label: Raven Australia; Australian release	—	—
2004	Nancy Sinatra & Friends: Released: 2004; Label: Falcon (Germany)	—	—
2005	The Very Best of Nancy Sinatra: Released: September 12, 2005; Label: Boots Enterprises / Warner Music Australia; Australian release; Contains previously unreleased material	—	—
2005	Bubblegum Girl Vol. 1: Released: December 14, 2005; Label: Boots Enterprises; Digital only; Contains previously unreleased material	—	—
2005	Bubblegum Girl Vol. 2: Released: December 19, 2005; Label: Boots Enterprises; Digital only; Contains previously unreleased material	—	—
2006	The Essential Nancy Sinatra: Released: March 20, 2006; Label: Boots Enterprises/EMI; CD; European release; Contains previously unreleased material	—	—
2006	Ladybird: Released: 2006; Label: Drive (Italy)	—	—
2008	Kid Stuff: Released: March 17, 2008; Label: Boots Enterprises; Digital only; Contains previously unreleased material	—	—
2009	Cherry Smiles – The Rare Singles: Released: September 22, 2009; Label: Boots Enterprises; Digital only; Contains previously unreleased material	—	—
2021	Start Walkin' 1965–1976: Released: February 5, 2021; Label: Boots Enterprises / Light in the Attic; CD, vinyl, cassette, digital	—	36
2023	Keep Walkin': Singles, Demos & Rarities 1965–1978: Released: September 27, 2023; Physical release: October 20, 2023; Label: Boots Enterprises / Light in the Attic; CD, vinyl, cassette, digital, 4-track, 8-track	—	—
"—" denotes releases that did not chart or were not released in that territory

== Other appearances ==
Year	Song	Album
1967	"You Only Live Twice"	You Only Live Twice: Original Motion Picture Soundtrack
1967	"Somethin' Stupid" (with Frank Sinatra)	The World We Knew
1968	"Your Groovy Self"	Speedway soundtrack
1968	"There Ain't Nothing Like a Song" (with Elvis Presley)	Speedway soundtrack
1981	"Rudolph the Red-Nosed Reindeer" (with Mel Tillis)	Christmas Country
1987	"These Boots Are Made for Walkin'"	Full Metal Jacket Original Motion Picture Soundtrack
1991	"God Rest You Merry, Gentlemen"	A Christmas Album... A Gift of Hope
1996	"Summer Wine – Sie sah mich an" (with Roland Kaiser)	Grenzenlos
1999	"Kicks" (with The Ventures)	Walk Don't Run 2000
2000	"The Love Song for The Independent"	The Independent
2002	"Side by Side" (with Frank Sinatra & Tri-Tones)	Classic Duets
2002	"You Make Me Feel So Young (Old)" (with Frank Sinatra)	Classic Duets
2003	"Bang Bang (My Baby Shot Me Down)"	Kill Bill Vol. 1 Original Soundtrack
2005	"These Boots Are Made for Walkin'" (with Paul Revere & the Raiders)	Ride to the Wall Vol. 23
2005	"Shot You Down" (with Audio Bullys)	Generation
2006	"Another Gay Sunshine Day"	Another Gay Movie soundtrack
2006	"Another Ray of Sunshine"	Another Gay Movie soundtrack
2008	"Somethin' Stupid" (recorded live March 1982) (with Frank Sinatra)	Sinatra: Vegas
2011	"To Ardent" (with Black Devil Disco Club)	Circus
2011	"End of the World"	Download for Good
2016	"MacArthur Park"	Absolutely Fabulous: The Movie soundtrack
2017	"Kaleidoscope" (with Rod McKuen)	Love's Been Good to Me – The Songs of Rod McKuen

== Singles ==
Year	Single (A-side, B-side)	Peak chart positions								Original album	CD or digital reissue
Year	Single (A-side, B-side)	US	US AC	US Country	CAN	UK	NOR	AUS	ITA	Original album	CD or digital reissue
1961	"Cuff Links and a Tie Clip" b/w "Not Just Your Friend"	—	—	—	—	—	—	—	38	Non-album tracks	Bubblegum Girl Vol. 1
1962	"Like I Do" /	—	—	—	—	—	—	—	2	Non-album tracks	Bubblegum Girl Vol. 1
1962	"To Know Him Is to Love Him"	—	—	—	—	—	—	—	—	Non-album tracks	N/A
1962	"June, July, and August" b/w "Think of Me"	—	—	—	—	—	—	—	—	Non-album tracks	A: Bubblegum Girl Vol. 2 B: Bubblegum Girl Vol. 1
1962	"You Can Have Any Boy" b/w "Tonight You Belong to Me"	—	—	—	—	—	—	—	—	Non-album tracks	A: Bubblegum Girl Vol. 1 B: Bubblegum Girl Vol. 2
1963	"I See the Moon" b/w "Put Your Head on My Shoulder"	—	—	—	—	—	—	—	—	Non-album tracks	A: Bubblegum Girl Vol. 1 B: Bubblegum Girl Vol. 2
1963	"The Cruel War" b/w "One Way"	—	—	—	—	—	—	—	—	Non-album tracks	A: Bubblegum Girl Vol. 2 B: Bubblegum Girl Vol. 1
1963	"Thanks to You" b/w "Tammy"	—	—	—	—	—	—	—	—	Non-album tracks	Bubblegum Girl Vol. 1
1964	"Where Do the Lonely Go?" b/w "Just Think About the Good Times"	—	—	—	—	—	—	—	—	Non-album tracks	Bubblegum Girl Vol. 2
1964	"This Love of Mine" b/w "There Goes the Bride"	—	—	—	—	—	—	—		Non-album tracks	Bubblegum Girl Vol. 2
1965	"True Love" b/w "The Answer to Everything"	—	—	—	—	—	—	—	—	Non-album tracks	A: Sheet Music; B: Bubblegum Girl, Vol. 1
1965	"So Long Babe" b/w "If He'd Love Me"	86	—	—	38	—	—	—	—	A: Boots; B: Non-album tracks	Boots
1965	"These Boots Are Made for Walkin'" b/w "The City Never Sleeps at Night"	1	—	—	1	1	2	1	3	A: Boots; B: Non-album tracks	Boots
1966	"How Does That Grab You, Darlin'?" b/w "The Last of the Secret Agents?"	7	—	—	2	19	—	4	24	A: How Does That Grab You? B: Non-album track	How Does That Grab You?
1966	"Friday's Child" b/w "Hutchinson Jail"	36	—	—	37	55 (Note: Chart position is from the official UK "Breakers List".)	—	67	—	Nancy in London	Nancy in London
1966	"In Our Time" b/w "Leave My Dog Alone"	46	—	—	59	—	—	67	—	Non-album tracks	Boots
1966	"Sugar Town" /	5	1	—	5	8	—	14	49	Sugar	Sugar
1966	"Summer Wine" (with Lee Hazlewood)	49	—	—	61	—	—	14	—	Nancy in London	Nancy in London
1967	"Somethin' Stupid" (with Frank Sinatra) b/w "I Will Wait for You" (Frank Sinatra) "Give Her Love" (Frank Sinatra, later releases)	1	1	—	1	1	1	1	20	Nancy's Greatest Hits (A-side only)	Sugar (A-side only)
1967	"Love Eyes" b/w "Coastin'"	15	30	—	17	55	—	84	—	A: Non-album track B: Sugar	Sugar
1967	"Jackson" (with Lee Hazlewood) /	14	39	—	17	11	11	9	49	Country, My Way	Country, My Way
1967	"You Only Live Twice"	44	3	—	39	11	—	10	43	Nancy's Greatest Hits	Nancy in London
1967	"Lightning's Girl" b/w "Until It's Time for You to Go"	24	—	—	26	54	—	5	—	A: Nancy's Greatest Hits; B: Non-album single	How Does That Grab You?
1967	"Lady Bird" (with Lee Hazlewood) /	20	—	—	26	47	—	15	—	Nancy & Lee	Nancy & Lee
1967	"Sand" (with Lee Hazlewood)	107	—	—	—	—	—	15	—	How Does That Grab You?	How Does That Grab You?
1967	"Tony Rome" b/w "This Town"	83	—	—	—	—	—	—	—	A: Non-album track B: Movin' with Nancy	A: Nancy in London; B: Movin' with Nancy
1967	"Some Velvet Morning" (with Lee Hazlewood) /	26	—	—	36	—	—	44	—	Movin' with Nancy	Movin' with Nancy
1967	"Oh, Lonesome Me" (with Lee Hazlewood)	—	—	—	—	—	—	10	—	Country, My Way	Country, My Way
1968	"Things" (with Dean Martin) b/w "Up, Up and Away"	—	—	—	—	—	1	61	—	Movin' with Nancy	Movin' with Nancy
1968	"100 Years" b/w "See the Little Children"	69	29	—	54	—	—	91	—	A: Non-album single B: Movin' with Nancy	A: Nancy in London; B: Movin' with Nancy
1968	"Happy" b/w "Nice 'n' Easy"	74	18	—	58	—	—	43	—	Non-album tracks	Nancy
1968	"Good Time Girl" b/w "Old Devil Moon"	65	—	—	86	—	—	73	—	Non-album tracks	A: Movin' with Nancy; B: Nancy
1969	"God Knows I Love You" b/w "Just Bein' Plain Old Me"	97	40	—	98	—	—	59	—	Nancy	Nancy
1969	"Here We Go Again" b/w "Memories"	98	19	—	—	—	—	—	—	Nancy	Nancy
1969	"Drummer Man" b/w "Home"	98	—	—	92	—	—	—	—	Non-album tracks	A: Movin' with Nancy; B: Nancy
1969	"It's Such a Lonely Time of Year" b/w "Kids"	—	—	—	—	—	—	—	—	The Sinatra Family Wish You a Merry Christmas	The Sinatra Family Wish You a Merry Christmas
1970	"I Love Them All (The Boys in the Band)" b/w "Home"	—	—	—	—	—	—	—	—	Non-album tracks	A: Movin' with Nancy; B: Nancy
1970	"Hello L.A., Bye-Bye Birmingham" b/w "White Tattoo"	—	—	—	—	—	—	—	—	Non-album tracks	A: Country, My Way; B: Kid Stuff
1970	"The Highway Song" b/w "Are You Growing Tired of My Love"	—	—	—	—	21	—	—	—	Non-album tracks	Country, My Way
1970	"How Are Things in California?" b/w "I'm Not a Girl Anymore"	—	17	—	—	—	—	—	—	Non-album tracks	A: California Girl; B: Cherry Smiles: The Rare Singles
1970	"Feelin' Kinda Sunday" (with Frank Sinatra) b/w "Kids" (Nancy Sinatra)	—	30	—	—	—	—	—	—	Non-album tracks	A: How Does That Grab You? B: The Sinatra Family Wish You a Merry Christmas
1971	"Hook and Ladder" b/w "Is Anybody Going to San Antone?"	—	—	—	—	—	—	—	—	Non-album tracks	A: Kid Stuff; B: Cherry Smiles: The Rare Singles
1971	"Life's a Trippy Thing" (with Frank Sinatra) b/w "I'm Not Afraid" (Frank Sinatra)	—	—	—	—	—	—	—	—	Non-album tracks	Nancy in London (A-side only)
1971	"Glory Road" b/w "Is Anybody Going to San Antone?"	—	—	—	—	—	—	—	—	Non-album tracks	Cherry Smiles: The Rare Singles
1971	"Did You Ever" (with Lee Hazlewood) b/w "Back on the Road" (with Lee Hazlewood)	—	—	—	—	2	—	20	—	Nancy & Lee Again	Nancy & Lee Again
1972	"Down from Dover" (with Lee Hazlewood) b/w "Paris Summer" (with Lee Hazlewood)	120	—	—	—	—	—	—	—	Nancy & Lee Again	Nancy & Lee Again
1973	"Kind of a Woman" b/w "It's the Love (That Keeps It All Together)"	—	—	—	—	—	—	—	—	Woman	Woman
1973	"Sugar Me" b/w "Ain't No Sunshine"	—	—	—	—	—	—	—	—	Non-album tracks	A: How Does It Feel? B: Cherry Smiles: The Rare Singles
1975	"Annabell of Mobile" b/w "She Played Piano and He Beat the Drums"	—	—	—	—	—	—	—	—	Non-album tracks	Cherry Smiles: The Rare Singles
1976	"Kinky Love" b/w "She Played Piano and He Beat the Drums"	—	—	—	—	—	—	—	—	Non-album tracks	A: Sheet Music; B: Cherry Smiles: The Rare Singles
1976	"(L'été Indien) Indian Summer" (with Lee Hazlewood) b/w "Dolly and Hawkeye" (Nancy Sinatra)	—	—	—	—	—	—	—	—	Non-album tracks	Start Walkin' 1965-1976
1977	"It's For My Dad" b/w "A Gentle Man Like You"	—	—	—	—	—	—	—	—	Non-album tracks	A: For My Dad (EP); B: Cherry Smiles: The Rare Singles
1980	"Let's Keep It That Way" b/w "One Jump Ahead of the Storm"	—	—	—	—	—	—	—	—	Non-album tracks	Cherry Smiles: The Rare Singles
1981	"Texas Cowboy Night" (with Mel Tillis) b/w "After the Lovin'" (with Mel Tillis)	—	—	23	—	—	—	—	—	Mel and Nancy	N/A
1981	"Play Me or Trade Me" (with Mel Tillis) /	—	—	43	—	—	—	—	—	Mel and Nancy	N/A
1981	"Where Would I Be" (with Mel Tillis)	—	—	—	—	—	—	—	—	Mel and Nancy	N/A
1981	"Rudolph the Red Nosed Reindeer" (with Mel Tillis) b/w "Winter Wonderland" (Dave & Sugar)	—	—	—	—	—	—	—	—	Christmas Country	N/A
1995	"Bone Dry"	—	—	—	—	—	—	—	—	One More Time	One More Time
1995	"Now I Have Everything"	—	—	—	—	—	—	—	—	One More Time	One More Time
2004	"Barricades & Brickwalls" (with Lee Hazlewood) b/w "Barricades & Brickwalls (Nancy Solo Version)"	—	—	—	—	—	—	—	—	Nancy & Lee 3	Nancy & Lee 3
2004	"Let Me Kiss You" b/w "Bossman"	—	—	—	—	46	—	—	—	Nancy Sinatra	Nancy Sinatra
2004	"Burnin' Down the Spark" b/w "Two Shots of Happy, One Shot of Sad"	—	—	—	—	—	—	—	—	Nancy Sinatra	Nancy Sinatra
2005	"Shot You Down" (with Audio Bullys)	—	—	—	—	3	—	17	—	The Essential Nancy Sinatra	The Essential Nancy Sinatra
2009	"Glory Road" b/w "Dolly and Hawkeye"	—	—	—	—	—	—	—	—	Non-album tracks	Cherry Smiles: The Rare Singles
2010	"These Boots Are Made for Walkin' (performed live on the Ed Sullivan Show February 27, 1966)	—	—	—	—	—	—	—	—	Non-album tracks	N/A
2010	"Sugar Town (performed live on the Ed Sullivan Show October 30, 1966)	—	—	—	—	—	—	—	—	Non-album tracks	N/A
2011	"To Ardent" (with Black Devil Disco Club)	—	—	—	—	—	—	—	—	Circus	Circus
2011	"Jack in Boots" (with Lempo & Japwow)	—	—	—	—	—	—	—	—	Digital download singles	Digital download singles
2016	"Song of Love for Danny"	—	—	—	—	—	—	—	—	Digital download singles	Digital download singles
2017	"Bang Bang" (with Lee Bryan DJ)	—	—	—	—	—	—	—	—	Crazy Neon Signs	Crazy Neon Signs
2020	"(L'été Indien) Indian Summer" (Remastered Single Edit) (with Lee Hazlewood)	—	—	—	—	—	—	—	—	Non-album tracks	Start Walkin' 1965-1976
2021	"For Some"	—	—	—	—	—	—	—	—	Non-album tracks	Boots (2021 Reissue)
2023	"Something Pretty"	—	—	—	—	—	—	—	—	Non-album tracks	Keep Walkin': Singles, Demos & Rarities 1965–1978
2023	"Do I Hear a Waltz?"	—	—	—	—	—	—	—	—	Non-album tracks	Keep Walkin': Singles, Demos & Rarities 1965–1978
"—" denotes releases that did not chart or were not released in that territory. "N/A" denotes tracks unavailable on CD format to date.
