= Don Randi =

American keyboard player, bandleader, and songwriter

- Born: February 25, 1937 (age 89); New York City, U.S.
- Genres: Pop, rock, jazz
- Occupation: Musician
- Instrument: Keyboards
- Years active: 1956–present
- Formerly of: The Wrecking Crew

Don Randi (born February 25, 1937) is an American keyboard player, bandleader, and songwriter who was a member of the Wrecking Crew. He is the father of bassist and singer Leah Randi.

== Career ==
Don was born February 25, 1937, in New York City. He was raised in the Catskill Mountains and studied classical music. In 1954, he moved to Los Angeles and became a studio musician. During the next year, he began working at record distribution company where he was influenced by jazz musicians, particularly Horace Silver.

He began his career as a pianist and keyboard player in 1956, gradually establishing a reputation as a leading session musician. In the early 1960s, he was musician and arranger for record producer Phil Spector's Wall of Sound. He played piano on "These Boots Are Made For Walkin'" by Nancy Sinatra and on her albums, as well as being a member of her touring band for decades. He performed on the Beach Boys' "Good Vibrations" and "God Only Knows". He recorded live albums of piano jazz as a solo performer and as the leader of the Don Randi Trio with Leroy Vinnegar and Mel Lewis. Randi wrote film scores during the 1970s, including Bloody Mama (1970), Up in the Cellar (1970), J. W. Coop (1971), Stacey (1973), and Santee (1973).

In 1970, he opened The Baked Potato jazz club in Studio City, California, and formed Don Randi and Quest as the house band. The band recorded over 15 albums and was nominated for a Grammy Award in 1980 for the album New Baby. In 2010, the Baked Potato was named Best Jazz Club by Los Angeles magazine.

In 2008, as a member of the Wrecking Crew, Randi was inducted into the Hollywood RockWalk.

== Discography ==
=== As leader ===
- Feelin' Like Blues (World Pacific, 1960)
- Where Do We Go from Here? (Verve, 1962)
- Last Night/with the Don Randi Trio (Verve, 1962)
- Mexican Pearls (Palomar, 1965)
- Revolver Jazz (Reprise, 1966)
- Live On the Sunset Strip! (Reprise, 1967)
- 3 in the Cellar (American International, 1970)
- At the Baked Potato (Poppy, 1972)
- Don Randi & the Baked Potato Band (JAS, 1975)
- Bermuda Triangle (Dobre, 1978)
- New Baby (Sheffield Lab, 1979)
- California 84 (Bee Pee, 1983)
- Baked Potato Shuffle (Baked Potato, 1988)
- Don't Look Back (Headfirst, 1989)
- Wind and Sea (Headfirst, 1990)

=== As sideman ===
With David Axelrod

- Songs of Experience (Capitol, 1969)
- Earth Rot (Capitol, 1970)
- Strange Ladies (MCA, 1977)
- David Axelrod (Mo Wax, 2001)

With others

- Susie Allanson, Susie Allanson (ABC, 1976)
- Harold Betters, Funk City Express (Reprise, 1966)
- Bob B. Soxx & the Blue Jeans, Zip-A-Dee Doo Dah (Philles, 1976)
- Pat Boone, Texas Woman (Hitsville, 1976)
- James Brown, It's a New Day So Let a Man Come In (King, 1970)
- James Brown, Get On the Good Foot (Polydor, 1993)
- Roy Brown, Hard Times (Bluesway, 1973)
- Thumbs Carllile, On His Own (Gemini, 1973)
- Jerry Cole, Outer Limits (Capitol, 1963)
- Cass Elliot, Cass Elliot (RCA Victor, 1972)
- England Dan & John Ford Coley, Fables (A&M, 1972)
- Gale Garnett, Gale Garnett Sings About Flying & Rainbows & Love & Other Groovy Things (RCA Victor, 1967)
- Lee Hazlewood, The N.S.V.I.P.'s (Reprise, 1964)
- Lee Hazlewood, Love and Other Crimes (Reprise, 1968)
- Jack Jones, What I Did for Love (RCA Victor, 1975)
- Dean Martin, Once in a While (Reprise, 1978)
- Bette Midler, Broken Blossom (Atlantic, 1977)
- The Monkees, Listen to the Band (Rhino, 1991)
- Sandy Nelson, Rock 'n' Roll Revival (Imperial, 1968)
- Jack Nitzsche, The Lonely Surfer (Reprise, 1963)
- Michelle Phillips, Victim of Romance (A&M, 1990)
- Elvis Presley, NBC-TV Special (RCA, 1991)
- Michael Quatro, Gettin' Ready (Prodigal, 1977)
- Emitt Rhodes, The American Dream (A&M, 1970)
- Nelson Riddle, Contemporary Sound of Nelson Riddle (United Artists, 1968)
- Tommy Roe, Beginnings (ABC, 1971)
- The Ronettes, Presenting the Fabulous Ronettes Featuring Veronica (Philles, 1964)
- Nancy Sinatra, Sugar (Reprise, 1966)
- Stone Poneys, Evergreen Vol. 2 (Capitol, 1967)
- Townes Van Zandt, Our Mother the Mountain (Poppy, 1969)
- Stephanie Winslow, Crying (Warner Bros., 1980)

== Notable singles ==
Based on information from Randi’s book, You’ve Heard These Hands.

Charting for singles is on the US singles charts.

Artist	Title	Date & highest position on US charts	Miscellaneous
The Beach Boys	“God Only Knows”	#39, 9/17/66	
The Beach Boys	“Good Vibrations"	#1, 10/29/66	
The Beach Boys	“Help Me Rhonda"	# 1, 5/01/65	
The Beach Boys	“Wouldn't It Be Nice"	#8, 8/20/65	
Buffalo Springfield	“Broken Arrow”	Released 11/18/67	produced and arranged by Jack Nitzsche
Glen Campbell	“I'm Not Gonna Miss You”	released on September 30, 2014	for the soundtrack to the documentary Glen Campbell: I'll Be Me, the last song Campbell recorded
The Crystals	“He's a Rebel"	#1, 10/06/62	produced by Phil Spector, #2 R&B
The Crystals	“Da Doo Ron Ron”	#3, 5/11/63	# 5 R&B
The Crystals	"Then He Kissed Me"	#6, 8/31/63	#8 R&B
Sammy Davis Jr.	"The Candy Man"	#1, 10/6/72	
Neil Diamond	"Cracklin' Rosie"	#1, 8/29/70	
Lesley Gore	"It's My Party"	#1, 5/18/63	#1 R&B, produced by Quincy Jones, arranged byJack Nietzsche
The Jackson 5	"ABC"	#1, 3/21/70	#1 R&B
Jan and Dean	"Popsicle"	#21, 6/18/66	
Ben E. King	"Spanish Harlem"	#10, 1/30/61	#15 R&B
Dean Martin	"Everybody Loves Somebody"	#1, 7/11/64	
Barry McGuire	"Eve of Destruction"	#1, 8/28/65	
Jack Nitzsche	"The Lonely Surfer"	#39, 9/7/63	
Laura Nyro	"Save the Country"		
The Paris Sisters	"I Love How You Love Me"	#5, 10/2/61	
Ray Peterson	"Corinna, Corinna"	#9, 12/19/60	
Elvis Presley	"A Little Less Conversation"		
Gary Puckett & The Union Gap	"Young Girl"	#2, 3/16/68	
Gary Puckettt and the Union Gap	"Lady Willpower"	#2, 6/22/68	
The Righteous Brothers	"You've Lost That Lovin' Feelin'"	#1, 12/26/64	#2 R&B
The Righteous Brothers	"Ebb Tide"	#5, 12/11/65	#13 R&B
The Righteous Brothers	"Unchained Melody"	#4, 7/31/65	#6 R&B
The Ronettes	"Be My Baby"	#7, 4/30/66	#4
Diana Ross	"Touch Me in the Morning"	#1, 7/7/73	#5 R&B
Frank and Nancy Sinatra	"Somethin' Stupid"	#1, 3/25/67	
Nancy Sinatra	"These Boots Are Made for Walkin'"	#1, 2/5/66	
Nancy Sinatra	"How Does That Grab You, Darlin'?"	#7, 4/30/66	
Nancy Sinatra and Lee Hazlewood	"Jackson"	# 14, 7/8/67	
O.C. Smith	"The Son of Hickory Holler's Tramp"	#40, 4/20/68	#32 R&B
Sonny and Cher	"I Got You Babe"	#1, 7/31/65	#19 R&B
The Spiral Staircase	"More Today Than Yesterday"	#12, 5/3/69	
Stone Poneys	"Different Drum"	#13, 12/9/67	lead vocals Linda Ronstadt
Hank Williams Jr.	"Family Tradition"		

== Notable albums ==
A list of notable albums that Randi played on.

Artist	Title	Date & highest position on US charts	Miscellaneous
The Association	And Then... Along Comes the Association	#5, 10/01/66	
The Beach Boys	Pet Sounds	#10, 06/11/66	
The Beach Boys	The Smile Sessions		
Buffalo Springfield	Buffalo Springfield Again	Released 11/18/67	
Tim Buckley	Goodbye and Hello	Released September 1967	
Leonard Cohen	Death of a Ladies Man	Released November 13, 1977	produced by Phil Spector
Neil Diamond	Tap Root Manuscript	#13, 11/21/70	
The Electric Prunes	Mass in F Minor		arranged by David Axelrod
Cass Elliot	The Road is No Place for a Lady		
The Jackson 5	ABC	#4, 6/6/70	
Love	The Best of Love		
The Monkees	The Birds, The Bees & The Monkees	#3, 5/18/68	
The Monkees	More of the Monkees	#1, 2/11/67	
Michael Nesmith	The Wichita Train Whistle Sings		
Mickey Newbury	An American Trilogy		
Harry Nilsson	The Point!	#25, 4/10/71	
Michelle Phillips	Victim of Romance		Produced by Jack Nitzsche
The Righteous Brothers	You've Lost That Lovin' Feelin'	#4, 2/6/65	
The Righteous Brothers	Back to Back	#16, 2/5/66	
Tommy Roe	Beginnings	1971	
The Ronettes	Presenting the Fabulous Ronettes Featuring Veronica	#96	released November 1964
Nancy Sinatra	Boots	#5, 3/26/66	
Nancy Sinatra	How Does That Grab You?		
Nancy Sinatra	Country My Way		
Nancy Sinatra	Nancy		
Nancy Sinatra and Lee Hazlewood	Nancy and Lee	# 13, 5/25/68	
Sonny and Cher	Look At Us	#2, 9/4/65	
Phil Spector	Back to Mono (1958–1969)		
Phil Spector	A Christmas Gift for You from Phil Spector		In 2019, it was ranked the greatest Christmas album of all time by Rolling Stone.
The Spiral Staircase	More Today Than Yesterday		
Jim Sullivan	U.F.O.		
The Tubes	Young and Rich		
Townes Van Zandt	Our Mother the Mountain		
Townes Van Zandt	High, Low and In Between		
Hank Williams Jr.	Family Tradition		
