= Summer Records =

Summer Records was a Canadian reggae record label, active between the mid-1970s and late 1980s. Based in Malton, Ontario, a suburb of Toronto, it became one of Canada's first Black-owned record labels, as well as one of the first to release Canadian-made reggae music.

== History ==
The label was founded in 1974 by Jerry Brown, a Jamaican immigrant to Canada. In the 1960s, Brown had been a singer with a group known as The Jamaicans, but left the group just before they became popular. After a brief stint working on a cruise ship, Brown decided he wanted to move to the United States, but feared that if he did, he would be drafted to fight in Vietnam. So he came to Canada instead, where he found a small but growing Caribbean music scene. The majority of the music Brown heard around him was ska and calypso, but he was more interested in reggae. So with the money he made as a full-time mechanic, Brown, with partner Oswald Creary, bought a house on a dead-end street in Malton, and built a small recording studio in the basement. This would be where all of Summer Records music would be recorded.

The first two songs on the label, "Love Makes the World Go Round" and "Sunrise" by Johnny Osbourne with Bunny Brown, were still built around rhythms imported from Jamaica. Released in 1974, the single sold poorly, and did not get any airplay on radio. Few radio stations in Canada played reggae at the time, and the few that did played only songs by well-known artists, such as Eric Clapton's "I Shot the Sheriff". But this did not deter Brown.

In 1976, Brown met Lloyd James (aka Prince Jammy, later King Jammy) at the Masonic Temple in Toronto. King Jammy joined Summer Records, but his arrival caused friction between Brown and Creary. Creary soon left to found his own record label, Half Moon Records. Summer Records continued to release singles which, while ignored at home in Canada, were being noticed abroad. In Jamaica, there was some resistance to the fact that the records were not made there, but Brown got over that by putting a "Made in Jamaica" label on them.

In 1977, Summer Records released their first full-length record, Innocent Youths. It was made by Earth, Roots and Water, a group that had played on many Summer Records artists' music. The band were also the opening act for The Police, at the first gig the UK band did in Toronto. The two bands got along well, and The Police brought a copy of Innocent Youths home with them. It became one of the inspirations behind the album Outlandos d'Amour, and The Police wanted to have Earth, Roots and Water open for them on their North American tour. However, by that point, poor record sales had already caused the Canadian group to disband.

In 1979, former Sound Dimension and Skatalites member Jackie Mittoo collaborated with Willi Williams to create a new version of the song "Real Rock". It was released on Summer Records as "Armagideon Time", and would later be covered by the UK band The Clash. Williams would later create another version of the song, called "Rocking Universally" which Summer also released. A third version would be released, also known as "Rocking Universally", but this version was by Noel Ellis, another Summer Records artist.

Ellis released a self-titled album in 1983, which would be the second and last full-length LP that Summer Records would release. Sales were poor, so Brown decided that Summer would, going forward, only release singles, which were cheaper to produce.

Meanwhile, King Jammy had returned to Jamaica and had created the "Sleng Teng" beat, a digital rhythm style named after the Wayne Smith song "Under Me Sleng Teng". This started a fad in reggae music for using electronic instruments. Summer Records would follow that trend by releasing songs like "Call Me Nobody Else" by Unique Madoo, as well as "Ska Doo" and "Run Them a Run" by Williams. "Call Me Nobody Else" was a hit for the label and sold several hundred copies. However, Brown preferred traditional instruments and Summer Records went back to the old school style.

By 1988, Brown who was still working full-time as a mechanic, and also had a family to support, could no longer afford to keep Summer Records going. He sold the house in Malton, as well as the equipment, and in 1992, he moved back to Jamaica. The entire Summer Records catalogue went out of print, and became scarce. This began to change in the late 2000s, as the US record label Light in the Attic Records re-released some of Summer Records music on CD, vinyl and digital formats. Releases include Summer Records Anthology 1974–1988, as well as a reissue of Innocent Youths.
