= Light in the Attic Records =

American record label

Light in the Attic
- Founded: 2001
- Founder: Matt Sullivan; Josh Wright
- Genre: Various
- Country of origin: U.S.
- Location: Seattle, Washington
- Official website: lightintheattic.net

Light in the Attic Records & Distribution is an independent record label, distribution company, and sync licensing house founded in 2001 in Seattle, Washington by Matt Sullivan; Josh Wright joined shortly thereafter. The label is noted for its reissues of albums by artists such as Rodriguez, Betty Davis, Hiroshi Yoshimura, Serge Gainsbourg, Jim Sullivan, Donnie and Joe Emerson, Karen Dalton, Lee Hazlewood, Nancy Sinatra, Sly Stone, and Lou Reed, as well as compilations of archival recordings in genres including Japanese city pop, country funk, and ambient. The label has also released albums by contemporary bands such as The Black Angels and Nicole Willis & The Soul Investigators.

In 2024, the online music database Discogs named Light in the Attic Indie Label of the Year. The label has also received multiple honors from the American Association of Independent Music (A2IM) at the Libera Awards, including winning Label of the Year (Medium) in 2021 and 2024, nomination for Marketing Genius in 2021, and winning Best Soul/Funk Record in 2024 for Betty Davis’ Crashin’ from Passion. Several Light in the Attic releases and contributors have received GRAMMY Award nominations, including Native North America (Vol. 1), Kankyō Ongaku: Japanese Ambient, Environmental & New Age Music 1980-1990, There's a Dream I've Been Saving: Lee Hazlewood Industries 1966-1971, and Lou Reed’s Words & Music, May 1965, with individual nominations for Alec Palao (Album Notes, I'm Just Like You: Sly's Stone Flower 1969–70), Kevin Howes (Album Notes, Creation Never Sleeps, Creation Never DIes: The Willie Dunn Anthology), and Masaki Koike (Packaging, Words & Music, May 1965).

== History ==
Matt Sullivan and Josh Wright met in elementary school in Bellevue, Washington, and later operated their high school’s 10-watt radio station, KASB. In the mid-90s, Sullivan interned at several Seattle-based labels, including Sub Pop and the now-defunct Loosegroove Records. Through Sub Pop’s Susie Tennant, he secured an internship at Madrid-based Munster Records, which specialized in reissues of artists such as The Stooges and Spacemen 3. This experience shaped his vision for creating a reissue-oriented label.

In 2001, Sullivan began co-producing live shows in Seattle under the names Music Makers and later Light in the Attic. These concerts featured performers such as the Walkmen, Saul Williams, Interpol, Clinic, and Kid Koala. Following a layoff from RealNetworks, Sullivan used his severance pay to finance the label’s first project, a joint release with Vampi Soul, a subsidiary of Munster Records, reissuing the Last Poets’ first two albums.

Early in its history, Light in the Attic conducted extensive record store and distribution road trips across North America, delivering large quantities of vinyl and CDs directly to independent retailers. Some of these trips were filmed and later aired by the American online music magazine Pitchfork.

In 2012-13, Light in the Attic received broader international attention following the success of the documentary Searching for Sugar Man, which won the best documentary Oscar at the 85th Academy Awards and brought renewed visibility to the label’s soundtrack release and its earlier reissues of singer-songwriter Rodriguez’s catalog. The film’s popularity introduced a new global audience to both Rodriguez’s music and the label’s archival and reissue work.

== Major Releases ==
Light in the Attic’s catalog includes numerous reissues and compilations spanning soul, funk, folk, rock, country, jazz, ambient, punk, hip-hop, and international genres. Notable projects include:

- 2001 reissues of The Last Poets (1970) and This Is Madness (1971).
- The soundtrack to the 1974 blaxploitation film Lialeh, composed by Bernard Purdie.
- A series of reissues by the vocal group The Free Design.
- Wheedle's Groove (2004), a compilation of soul and funk artists from Seattle, including Patrinell Wright, The Black & White Affair, Cold, Bold & Together (featuring Kenny G), Ron Buford, and Overton Berry.
- Passover (2006),the debut album by the psych-rock group The Black Angels.
- Reissues of Karen Dalton’s It’s So Hard To Tell Who’s Going to Love You the Best (1969; reissued 2009) and In My Own Time (1971; reissued 2006, deluxe reissue in 2022).
- 2007 reissues of Betty Davis' albums Betty Davis (1973) and They Say I'm Different (1974).
- 2008 reissue of Rodriguez’s Cold Fact (1970), which drew international attention.
- 2009 reissue of Serge Gainsbourg's Histoire de Melody Nelson (1971).
- Please Don't Tell Me How The Story Ends: Publishing Demos 1968 - 1972 (2010), a collection of previously unreleased early recordings by Kris Kristofferson.
- 2011 reissue of U.F.O. (1971) by singer-songwriter Jim Sullivan.
- Native North America, Vol. 1 (2014), a compilation of aboriginal musicians from Canada and the U.S., which received a Grammy Award nomination for Best Historical Album.
- A Japan-related series that includes the three-volume Pacific Breeze compilation series and albums by Hiroshi Yoshimura (GREEN), Haruomi Hosono (Philharmony, omni Sight Seeing, Paraiso, Hosono House and Cochin Moon), and Sachiko Kanenobu (Misora).
- A Jamaica-to-Toronto series that includes the compilations Jamaica to Toronto: Soul, Funk & Reggae 1967-1974 and Summer Records Anthology: 1974-1988, and albums by Jackie Mittoo (Wishbone), Noel Ellis (self-titled), and Earth, Roots & Water (Innocent Youths).
- A 2020 collaboration with Nancy Sinatra to reissue albums including Nancy & Lee (1968), Boots (1966), Nancy in London (1966), Sugar (1967), Country, My Way (1967), and compilations titled Start Walkin’ 1965–1976 and Keep Walkin’: Singles, Demos & Rarities 1965-1978.
- A 2022 collaboration with Laurie Anderson and the Lou Reed Archive to reissue Hudson River Wind Meditations (2007) and release compilations such as Why Don’t You Smile Now: Lou Reed at Pickwick Records 1964-65 and the Grammy-nominated Words & Music, May 1965.
- A 2024 collaboration with Ukrainian label Shukai to release Even the Forest Hums: Ukrainian Sonic Archives 1971–1996, a compilation introducing the diverse sonic and cultural heritage of Ukraine.

== Distribution ==
Light in the Attic operates a distribution network that serves more than 100 independent record labels worldwide. Its distribution portfolio includes labels from around the globe such as 180g, Enjoy the Ride, Everland Music, Great Tracks, HMV, iam8bit, Mississippi, Mondo, Temporal Drift, and Waxwork. The network is led by Josh Wright and provides vinyl and CD releases as well as other media (including video games, cassettes, books, DVDs) to retailers internationally, supporting the availability of a wide range of independent music.

== Imprints ==
Cinewax: Launched in 2010, focusing on vintage and contemporary film soundtracks. Releases include the Winter's Bone original soundtrack, the Winter's Bone original score by Dickon Hinchcliffe, the Project Nim original soundtrack and score, Blaze, Shogun Assassin, Low Down, American Dreamer, Chinatown, and Jodorosky's Dune, along with the DVD release of the documentary film Wheedle's Groove.

Modern Classic Recordings: Established in 2011 to reissue later-period releases. Its first title was Mercury Rev's Deserter's Songs (1998; reissued 2011), followed by Morphine's Cure For Pain (1993; reissued 2012). Other titles include the Stone Roses’ debut release(1988; reissued 2015), D’Angelo’s Voodoo (2000; reissued 2012), Built to Spill’s Ultimate Alternative Wavers (1993; reissued 2014), the Big Boys’ Lullabies Help the Brain Grow (1983; reissued 2014) and No Matter How Long the Line at the Cafeteria, There’s Always a Seat (1984; reissued 2014), Willie Nelson’s Teatro (1998; reissued 2015), Morphine’s Like Swimming (1997; reissued 2023), and Digable Planets’ Blowout Comb (1994; reissued 2018).

Future Days Recordings: Launched in 2012, focusing on reissues from the 1960s and 1970s. Releases include Pete Jolly’s Seasons (1970; reissued 2024), Annette Peacock’s I’m the One (1972; reissued 2012), Tim Buckley’s Lady, Give Me Your Key: The Unissued 1967 Solo Acoustic Sessions (recorded 1967; released 2016), and James Luther Dickinson’s solo album Dixie Fried (1972; reissued 2016). Future Days has also released works by artists such as the Grateful Dead, Françoise Hardy, Thin Lizzy, Lee Moses, Link Wray, Bobby Whitlock, and Terry Reid.

== Film Projects ==
The story of Detroit musician Sixto Rodriguez, whose work Light in the Attic reissued, was the subject of the 2012 Academy Award-winning documentary film Searching for Sugar Man. In 2020, Light in the Attic served as an executive producer of Karen Dalton: In My Own Time, a documentary about the folk musician whose studio albums the label reissued. In 2023, the film Dreamin’ Wild dramatized the story of Donnie and Joe Emerson, whose 1979 album Dreamin’ Wild was reissued by Light in the Attic in 2012. Chris Messina portrayed Sullivan in the film.

Light in the Attic has also provided music for film and television projects via an in-house sync licensing department that represents the Light in the Attic catalog as well as a wide variety of both vintage and contemporary record labels, catalogs and independent artists and estates. Recent placements include commercial/brand placements for Apple, Dos Equis, Toyota, BMW, Delta Air Lines, Uniqlo, Nike Inc, Google, Johnnie Walker, Adidas, Old Navy, 7 Up, Hotels.com, MLB, and Calvin Klein; sample licensing (Jim James, DJ Khaled, Bon Iver, et al); and movies/trailers and network/cable TV (HBO, NBC, FOX, ABC, Showtime, CBS, Netflix, Amazon, ESPN), including Wednesday, Eddington, The Righteous Gemstones, Walker, Pet Sematary: Bloodlines, Justified, The Conjuring: Last Rites, Ginny & Georgia, Abbott Elementary, Bad Sisters, Reservation Dogs, Big Little Lies, Mayans M.C., Tulsa King, Zero Day, Brilliant Minds, and Resident Alien.

Light in the Attic and has also produced several short documentaries. These include Even the Forest Hums: Ukrainian Sonic Archives 1971–1996, and profiles of artists and bands such as Jeff Bridges and Jim Sullivan. In addition, the label produced a series of six short videos that later aired on Pitchfork documenting its North American record store road trips, including stops at Daptone, Other Music, and Academy in New York City; Criminal Records in Atlanta; Reckless Records in Chicago; the Stax Museum of American Soul Music and Ardent Studios in Memphis; and Third Man Records in Nashville.

== Locations ==
Light in the Attic was originally based in Seattle, Washington, where it operated a record store, initially in the Ballard area, followed by the KEXP Gathering Space. In 2010, Sullivan opened a Los Angeles office. In 2025, the label relocated its distribution warehouse to Memphis, Tennessee, and Sullivan opened the Clay Pigeon, a Light in the Attic record store, vintage art gallery, and event space in Austin, Texas.

== Discography ==
LABEL NAME	CAT. NO.	ARTIST	TITLE	FORMAT(S)
Light in the Attic / Vampi Soul	LITA 001 / VAMPI 010	The Last Poets	The Last Poets / This Is Madness	
Light in the Attic / Vampi Soul	LITA 001 / VAMPI LP 010	The Last Poets	This Is Madness	
Light in the Attic	LITA 002	Sharpshooters	Twice As Nice	
Light in the Attic	LITA 003	Bernard Purdie	Bernard Purdie's Lialeh O.S.T.	
Light in the Attic	LITA 004	The Free Design	Kites Are Fun	
Light in the Attic	LITA 005	The Free Design	Heaven/Earth	
Light in the Attic	LITA 006	The Free Design	You Could Be Born Again	
Light in the Attic	LITA 007	The Free Design	Stars/Time/Bubbles/Love	
Light in the Attic	LITA 008	Wayne McGhie & The Sounds of Joy	Wayne McGhie & The Sounds of Joy	
Light in the Attic	LITA 009	Various Artists	Wheedle's Groove: Seattle's Finest In Funk & Soul 1965-75	
Light in the Attic	LITA 010	Various Artists	Deep Throat I & II Original Motion Picture Soundtracks	
Light in the Attic	LITA 011	Various Artists	Deep Throat I Original Motion Picture Soundtrack	
Light in the Attic	LITA 012	Various Artists	Deep Throat II Original Motion Picture Soundtrack	
Light in the Attic	LITA 013	The Free Design	Sing For Very Important People	
Light in the Attic	LITA 014	The Free Design	One By One	
Light in the Attic	LITA 015	The Free Design	There Is A Song	
Light in the Attic	LITA 016	The Free Design	The Now Sound Redesigned	
Light in the Attic	LITA 017	The Black Angels	The Black Angels	
Light in the Attic	LITA 018	The Black Angels	Passover	
Light in the Attic	LITA 019	Various Artists	Jamaica to Toronto: Soul, Funk & Reggae 1967 - 1974	
Light in the Attic	LITA 020	Noel Ellis	Noel Ellis	
Light in the Attic	LITA 021	Jackie Mittoo	Wishbone	
Light in the Attic	LITA 022	Karen Dalton	In My Own Time	
Light in the Attic	LITA 024	The Saturday Knights	Motorin'	
Light in the Attic	LITA 025	Various Artists	Light in the Attic Records Sampler 3.0	
Light in the Attic	LITA 026	Betty Davis	Betty Davis	
Light in the Attic	LITA 027	Betty Davis	They Say I'm Different	
Light in the Attic	LITA 028	Nicole Willis & The Soul Investigators	Keep Reachin' Up	
Light in the Attic	LITA 029	Various Artists	Summer Records Anthology 1974 - 1988	
Light in the Attic	LITA 030	The Blakes	Streets EP	
Light in the Attic	LITA 031	The Blakes	The Blakes	
Light in the Attic	LITA 032	Earth, Roots, and Water	Innocent Youths	
Light in the Attic	LITA 033	The Black Angels	Directions To See A Ghost	
Light in the Attic	LITA 034	Doug Randle	Songs For the New Industrial State	
Light in the Attic	LITA 035	The Saturday Knights	Mingle	
Light in the Attic	LITA 036	Rodriguez	Cold Fact	
Light in the Attic	LITA 037	The Black Angels	Black Angel Exit	
Light in the Attic	LITA 038	Rodriguez	Coming From Reality	
Light in the Attic	LITA 039	Stephen John Kalinich	A World Of Peace Must Come	
Light in the Attic	LITA 040	Serge Gainsbourg	Histoire de Melody Nelson	
Light in the Attic	LITA 041	Monks	The Early Years: 1964-1965	
Light in the Attic	LITA 042	Monks	Black Monk Time	
Light in the Attic	LITA 043	Wheedle's Groove	Kearney Barton	
Light in the Attic	LITA 044A	Various Artists	This LP Crashes Hard Drives	
Light in the Attic	LITA 044B	Various Artists	Light in the Attic Records Sampler 2009	
Light in the Attic	LITA 045	Karen Dalton	It's So Hard To Tell Who's Going To Love You The Best	
Light in the Attic	LITA 046	Betty Davis	Nasty Gal	
Light in the Attic	LITA 047	Betty Davis	Is This Love Or Desire	
Light in the Attic	LITA 048	Jane Birkin & Serge Gainsbourg	Je T'aime... Moi, Non Plus	
Light in the Attic	LITA 049	Lou Bond	Lou Bond	
Light in the Attic	LITA 050	Kris Kristofferson	Please Don't Tell Me How The Story Ends: The Publishing Demos 1968-72	
Light in the Attic	LITA 051	Various Artists	Si, Para Usted: The Funky Beats of Revolutionary Cuba Vol. 1	
Light in the Attic	LITA 052	Various Artists	Si, Para Usted: The Funky Beats of Revolutionary Cuba Vol. 2	
Light in the Attic	LITA 053	Gabor Szabo	Jazz Raga	
Light in the Attic	LITA 054	Jim Sullivan	U.F.O.	
Light in the Attic	LITA 055	Jane Birkin	Di Doo Dah	
Light in the Attic	LITA 056	Pastor T.L. Barrett and the Youth For Christ Choir	Like A Ship... (Without A Sail)	
Light in the Attic	LITA 057	Various Artists	Light in the Attic Records Sampler 2010	
Light in the Attic	LITA 058	The Overton Berry Ensemble / The Overton Berry Trio	TOBE / At Seattle's Doubletree Inn	
Light in the Attic	LITA 059	Vagrants	I Can't Make A Friend 1965 - 1968	
Light in the Attic	LITA 060	Michael Chapman	Fully Qualified Survivor	
Light in the Attic	LITA 061	Michael Hurley, The Unholy Modal Rounders, Jeffrey Frederick & The Clamtones	Have Moicy!	
Light in the Attic	LITA 062	Michael Hurley	Long Journey	
Light in the Attic	LITA 063	Michael Hurley	Snockgrass	
Light in the Attic	LITA 064	Various Artists	Our Lives Are Shaped By What We Love: Motown's Mowest Story 1971-73	
Light in the Attic	LITA 065	Shin Joong Hyun	Beautiful Rivers And Mountains: The Psychedelic Rock Sound Of South Korea's Shin Joong Hyun 1958-74	
Light in the Attic	LITA 066	The Black Angels	Another Nice Pair	
Light in the Attic	LITA 067	Charles 'Packy' Axton	Late Late Party 1965-67	
Light in the Attic	LITA 068	Jim Ford	Harlan County	
Light in the Attic	LITA 069	Shin Joong Hyun	From Where To Where: 1970-79	
Light in the Attic	LITA 070	The Louvin Brothers	Tragic Songs Of Life	
Light in the Attic	LITA 073	The Louvin Brothers	Satan Is Real	
Light in the Attic	LITA 074	The Louvin Brothers	Handpicked Songs 1955-1962	
Light in the Attic	LITA 075	The Louvin Brothers	Satan Is Real / Handpicked Songs 1955-1962	
Light in the Attic	LITA 076	Various Artists	Thai Funk Volume 1	
Light in the Attic	LITA 077	Various Artists	Wheedles Groove: Seattle’s Finest In Funk & Soul 1965–1979 Limited Edition 45s Box Set	
Light in the Attic	LITA 078	Various Artists	Thai Funk Volume 2	
Light in the Attic	LITA 079	Michael Chapman	Rainmaker	
Light in the Attic	LITA 080	Wendy Rene	After Laughter Comes Tears: Complete Stax & Volt Singles + Rarities 1964-1965	
Light in the Attic	LITA 081	Various Artists	Listen, Whitey! The Sounds of Black Power 1967-1974	
Light in the Attic	LITA 082	Donnie & Joe Emerson	Dreamin' Wild	
Light in the Attic	LITA 083	Various Artists	Country Funk 1969-1975	
Light in the Attic	LITA 084	Lee Hazlewood	Lee Hazlewood - The LHI Years: Singles, Nudes, & Backsides (1968-71)	
Light in the Attic	LITA 085	Various Artists	Never To Be Forgotten: The Flip Side of Stax 1968-1974	
Light in the Attic	LITA 086	Thin Lizzy	Thin Lizzy	
Light in the Attic	LITA 087	Lee Hazlewood	A House Safe For Tigers	
Light in the Attic	LITA 088	Ray Stinnett	A Fire Somewhere	
Light in the Attic	LITA 089	Rodriguez	Searching For Sugar Man - Original Motion Picture Soundtrack	
Light in the Attic	LITA 090	Marcos Valle	Marcos Valle	
Light in the Attic	LITA 091	Marcos Valle	Garra	
Light in the Attic	LITA 092	Marcos Valle	Vento Sul	
Light in the Attic	LITA 093	Marcos Valle	Previsão Do Tempo	
Light in the Attic	LITA 094	Various Artists	You Turned My Head Around: Lee Hazlewood Industries 1967-1970	
Light in the Attic	LITA 095	Various Artists	Theppabutr Productions: The Man Behind The Molam Sound 1972-75	
Light in the Attic	LITA 096	Lee Hazlewood	Trouble Is A Lonesome Town	
Light in the Attic	LITA 097	Roky Erickson	The Evil One	
Light in the Attic	LITA 098	Roky Erickson	Don't Slander Me	
Light in the Attic	LITA 099	Roky Erickson	Gremlins Have Pictures	
Light in the Attic	LITA 100	Public Image Ltd.	First Issue	
Light in the Attic	LITA 101	Michael Chapman	Wrecked Again	
Light in the Attic	LITA 102	Honey Ltd.	The Complete LHI Recordings	
Light in the Attic	LITA 103	Various Artists	Native North America (Vol. 1): Aboriginal Folk, Rock, and Country 1966–1985	
Light in the Attic	LITA 104	Mark Lanegan	Has God Seen My Shadow? An Anthology 1989-2011	
Light in the Attic	LITA 105	National Wake	Walk In Africa 1979-81	
Light in the Attic	LITA 106	The Brothers and Sisters	Dylan’s Gospel	
Light in the Attic	LITA 107	Various Artists	I Am The Center: Private Issue New Age Music In America 1950-1990	
Light in the Attic	LITA 108	Various Artists	Seattle Funk, Modern Soul & Boogie: Volume II 1972-1987	
Light in the Attic	LITA 109	Various Artists	There's a Dream I've Been Saving: Lee Hazlewood Industries 1966 - 1971 International Standard Box	
Light in the Attic	LITA 110	Robbie Hill's Family Affair	Gotta Get Back: The Unreleased L.A. Sessions	
Light in the Attic	LITA 111	Bobby Charles	Bobby Charles	
Light in the Attic	LITA 112	Bob Frank	Bob Frank	
Light in the Attic	LITA 113	Peter Walker	“Second Poem To Karmela" Or Gypsies Are Important	
Light in the Attic	LITA 114	Michael Chapman	Playing Guitar The Easy Way	
Light in the Attic	LITA 115	Donnie & Joe Emerson	Still Dreamin' Wild: The Lost Recordings 1979-81	
Light in the Attic	LITA 116	Various Artists	Country Funk Volume II 1967 - 1974	
Light in the Attic	LITA 117	Lewis	L'Amour	
Light in the Attic	LITA 118	Arthur	Dreams and Images	
Light in the Attic	LITA 119	Barbara Lynn	Here Is Barbara Lynn	
Light in the Attic	LITA 120	Supreme Jubilees	It'll All Be Over	
Light in the Attic	LITA 121	Sly Stone	I’m Just Like You: Sly’s Stone Flower 1969-70	
Light in the Attic	LITA 122	Sylvie Simmons	Sylvie	
Light in the Attic	LITA 123	Lewis	Romantic Times	
Light in the Attic	LITA 124	Michael Chapman	Window	
Light in the Attic	LITA 125	Spooner Oldham	Pot Luck	
Light in the Attic	LITA 126 / MR 110	Alan Vega, Alex Chilton, Ben Vaughn	Cubist Blues	
Light in the Attic	LITA 127	Johnnie Frierson	Have You Been Good To Yourself	
Light in the Attic	LITA 128	Gimmer Nicholson	Christopher Idylls	
Light in the Attic	LITA 129	Karin Krog	Don't Just Sing | An Anthology: 1963-1999	
Light in the Attic	LITA 130	The Kitchen Cinq	When The Rainbow Disappears : An Anthology 1965-68	
Light in the Attic	LITA 131	Lee Hazlewood	The Very Special World Of Lee Hazlewood	
Light in the Attic	LITA 132	Lee Hazlewood	Lee Hazlewoodism: Its Cause And Cure	
Light in the Attic	LITA 133	Lee Hazlewood	Something Special	
Light in the Attic	LITA 134	Lizzy Mercier Descloux	Press Color	
Light in the Attic	LITA 135	Betty Davis	The Columbia Years 1968-1969	
Light in the Attic	LITA 136	The City	Now That Everything's Been Said	
Light in the Attic	LITA 137	Lizzy Mercier Descloux	Mambo Nassau	
Light in the Attic	LITA 138	Lizzy Mercier Descloux	Zulu Rock	
Light in the Attic	LITA 139	Lizzy Mercier Descloux	One For The Soul	
Light in the Attic	LITA 140	Lizzy Mercier Descloux	Suspense	
Light in the Attic	LITA 141	Lifetones	For A Reason	
Light in the Attic	LITA 142	Lee Hazlewood	13	
Light in the Attic	LITA 143	Various Artists	The Microcosm: Visionary Music of Continental Europe, 1970-1986	
Light in the Attic	LITA 144	Lucio Battisti	Amore E Non Amore	
Light in the Attic	LITA 145	Various Artists	This Record Belongs To__________	
Light in the Attic	LITA 146	Various Artists	Heartworn Highways Original Soundtrack	
Light in the Attic / Munster Records	LITA 147	Alan Vega, Alex Chilton, Ben Vaughn	Live at Trans Musicales, Rennes, France, 7th December 1996	
Light in the Attic	LITA 148	Erasmo Carlos	Erasmo Carlos E Os Tremendões	
Light in the Attic	LITA 149	Erasmo Carlos	Carlos, Erasmo	
Light in the Attic	LITA 150	Erasmo Carlos	Sonhos E Memórias 1941-1972	
Light in the Attic	LITA 151	The Shaggs	Philosophy Of The World	
Light in the Attic	LITA 152	Hayes McMullan	Everyday Seem Like Murder Here	
Light in the Attic	LITA 153	Lee Hazlewood	Cowboy In Sweden	
Light in the Attic	LITA 154	Various Artists	Sing It High, Sing It Low: Tumbleweed Records 1971-1973	
Light in the Attic / Aquarium Drunkard	LITA 155 / AQD 001	Various Artists	Lagniappe Sessions, Volume 1	
Light in the Attic	LITA 156	Various Artists	Even A Tree Can Shed Tears: Japanese Folk & Rock 1969-1973	
Light in the Attic	LITA 157	Lynn Castle	Rose Colored Corner	
Light in the Attic	LITA 158	Thomas de Hartmann	The Music of Gurdjieff / de Hartmann	
Light in the Attic	LITA 159	Acetone	1992 - 2001	
Light in the Attic	LITA 160	Lee Hazlewood & Ann-Margret	The Cowboy & The Lady	
Light in the Attic	LITA 161	Lee Hazlewood	Forty	
Light in the Attic	LITA 162	Lee Hazlewood	Requiem For An Almost Lady	
Light in the Attic	LITA 163	Various Artists	Pacific Breeze: Japanese City Pop, AOR & Boogie 1976-1986	
Light in the Attic	LITA 164	Willie Dunn	Creation Never Sleeps, Creation Never Dies: The Willie Dunn Anthology	
Light in the Attic	LITA 165	Various Artists	Stone Crush: Memphis Modern Soul 1977-1987	
Light in the Attic	LITA 166	Zuider Zee	Zeenith	
Light in the Attic	LITA 167	Various Artists	Kankyō Ongaku: Japanese Ambient, Environmental & New Age Music 1980-1990	
Light in the Attic	LITA 168	Various Artists	Kearney Barton: Architect of the Northwest Sound	
Light in the Attic	LITA 169	Lee Hazlewood	Cruisin’ for Surf Bunnies	
Light in the Attic	LITA 170	Haruomi Hosono	Philharmony	
Light in the Attic	LITA 171	Haruomi Hosono	omni Sight Seeing	
Light in the Attic	LITA 172	Haruomi Hosono	Paraiso	
Light in the Attic	LITA 173	Haruomi Hosono	Hosono House	
Light in the Attic	LITA 174	Haruomi Hosono	Cochin Moon	
Light in the Attic	LITA 175	Sachiko Kanenobu	Misora	
Light in the Attic	LITA 176	Lee Hazlewood	400 Miles From L.A. 1955-56	
Light in the Attic	LITA 177	Jim Sullivan	Jim Sullivan	
Light in the Attic	LITA 178	Jim Sullivan	If The Evening Were Dawn	
Light in the Attic	LITA 179	Various Artists	Pacific Breeze 2: Japanese City Pop, AOR & Boogie 1972-1986	
Light in the Attic	LITA 180	Various Artists	Earl's Closet: The Lost Archive Of Earl McGrath, 1970 To 1980	
Light in the Attic	LITA 181	Leslie Winer	When I Hit You - You'll Feel It	
Light in the Attic	LITA 182	Various Artists	May The Circle Remain Unbroken: A Tribute To Roky Erickson	
Light in the Attic	LITA 183	Various Artists	Somewhere Between: Mutant Pop, Electronic Minimalism & Shadow Sounds of Japan 1980-1988	
Light in the Attic	LITA 188	Lou Reed	Words & Music, May 1965 - Standard Edition	
Light in the Attic	LITA 189	Lou Reed	Words & Music, May 1965 - Deluxe Edition	
Light in the Attic	LITA 190	Lou Reed	Hudson River Wind Meditations	
Light in the Attic	LITA 191	Leo Nocentelli	Another Side	
Light in the Attic / Water Copy	LITA 192-WC01	Hiroshi Yoshimura	Green	
Light in the Attic	LITA 193	The Shaggs	Shaggs' Own Thing	
Light in the Attic	LITA 194	Various Artists	Country Funk Volume 3	
Light in the Attic	LITA 195	Nancy Sinatra	Start Walkin' 1965–1976	
Light in the Attic	LITA 196	Betty Davis	Crashin' From Passion	
Light in the Attic	LITA 197	Nancy Sinatra	Boots	
Light in the Attic	LITA 198	Nancy Sinatra & Lee Hazlewood	Nancy & Lee	
Light in the Attic	LITA 199	Nancy Sinatra & Lee Hazlewood	Nancy & Lee Again	
Light in the Attic	LITA 200	Karen Dalton	In My Own Time - 50th Anniversary Edition	
Light in the Attic	LITA 202	Various Artists	Pacific Breeze 3: Japanese City Pop, AOR And Boogie 1975-1987	
Light in the Attic	LITA 203	Karen Dalton	In My Own Time - 50th Anniversary Deluxe Edition	
Light in the Attic	LITA 206	Jim Sullivan	U.F.O.	
Light in the Attic	LITA 208	Nancy Sinatra	Keep Walkin': Singles, Demos & Rarities 1965-1978	
Light in the Attic	LITA 211	Various Artists	Light in the Attic and Friends	
Light in the Attic	LITA 212	Various Artists	Why Don't You Smile Now: Lou Reed At Pickwick Records 1964–65)	
Light in the Attic	LITA 215	Various Artists	Even The Forest Hums: Ukrainian Sonic Archives 1971-1996	
Light in the Attic	LITA 216	Various Artists	Dreamin' Wild Original Motion Picture Soundtrack	
Light in the Attic	LITA 217	Various Artists	Power Of The Heart - A Tribute To Lou Reed	
Light in the Attic	LITA 218	Nancy Sinatra	How Does That Grab You?	
Light in the Attic	LITA 219	Nancy Sinatra	Nancy in London	
Light in the Attic	LITA 220	Nancy Sinatra	Sugar	
Light in the Attic	LITA 221	Nancy Sinatra	Country, My Way	
Light in the Attic	LITA 223	Nancy Sinatra	Nancy	
Light in the Attic	LITA 228	Jeff Bridges	Slow Magic, 1977-1978	
Light in the Attic	LITADIG 4002	Lynn Castle	Achin' in the Dawn	
Light in the Attic	LITADIG 4003	Lynn Castle	You Are the One	
Light in the Attic	LITADIG 4004	Willie Dunn	Willie Dunn (1971)	
Light in the Attic	LITADIG 4005	Piper	Summer Breeze	
Light in the Attic	LITADIG 4006	Piper	Gentle Breeze	
Light in the Attic	LITADIG 4007	Piper	Sunshine Kiz	
Light in the Attic	LITADIG 4008	Hiroshi Yoshimura	Green - SFX Version	
Light in the Attic	LITADIG 4009	Lee Hazlewood	For Every Solution There's A Problem	
Light in the Attic	LITADIG 4010	Leslie Winer	John Says	
Light in the Attic	LITADIG 4011	Lee Hazlewood	The Sweet Ride: Lost Recordings 1965-68	
Light in the Attic	LITADIG 4012	The Holy Light Jr's	Love Hides All Faults	
Light in the Attic	LITADIG 4013	Ocean to Ocean	Summertime b/w The World Needs A Lesson	
Light in the Attic	LITADIG 4014	Willie Dunn	Son of the Sun	
Light in the Attic	LITADIG 4015	Chris Dedrick	Be Free	
Light in the Attic	LITADIG 4016	Donnie Emerson with Nancy Sophia	Sister Oh Yeah - Live at Gold Diggers, Los Angeles, July 29th, 2023	
Light in the Attic	LITADIG 4019	Willie Dunn	Willie Dunn (1972)	
Light in the Attic	LITADIG 4020	Willie Dunn	The Pacific	
Light in the Attic	LITADIG 4021	Willie Dunn	The Vanity of Human Wishes	
Light in the Attic	n/a	Patrinell Staten	I Let A Good Man Go b/w Little Love Affair	7"
Light in the Attic	n/a	Misterholmes & The Brotherhood / CSC Funk Band	Thrift Store Find b/w Thrift Store Find	7"
Light in the Attic	LITA 45-001	Eddie Spencer	If This Is Love (I'd Rather Be Lonely) b/w You're So Good To Me Baby	7"
Light in the Attic	LITA 45-002	The Cougars	I Wish It Would Rain b/w Right On	7"
Light in the Attic	LITA 45-003	Lloyd Delpratt	Together b/w Warm Love	7"
Light in the Attic	LITA 45-004	Ram	Love Is The Answer b/w Love Is The Answer (Part 2)	7"
Light in the Attic	LITA 45-005	Karen Dalton	Something On Your Mind b/w Katie Cruel (Alternate Mix)	7"
Light in the Attic	LITA 45-006	The Black Angels	The First Vietnamese War b/w Nine Years	7"
Light in the Attic	LITA 45-007	The Black Angels	Better Off Alone b/w Yesterday Always Knows	7"
Light in the Attic	LITA 45-008	Betty Davis	Come Take Me b/w You Won't See Me In The Morning	7"
Light in the Attic	LITA 45-009	Betty Davis	He Was A Big Freak (Record Plant Rough Mix) b/w Don't Call Her No Tramp (Record Plant Rough Mix)	7"
Light in the Attic	LITA 45-010	The Blakes	Two Times b/w Die	7"
Light in the Attic	LITA 45-011	The Saturday Knights	45	CD Single
Light in the Attic	LITA 45-012	The Black Angels	Doves b/w Drone (In G# Major)	7"
Light in the Attic	LITA 45-013	The Blakes	Live Session	Digital
Light in the Attic	LITA 45-014	Rod Riguez	I'll Slip Away b/w You'd Like To Admit It	7"
Light in the Attic	LITA 45-015	Rodriguez	Can't Get Away b/w Street Boy	7"
Light in the Attic	LITA 45-015	The Blakes	Don't Bother Me (Radio Edit)	CD Single
Light in the Attic	LITA 45-016	Lou Bond	I'm For You b/w I'm Still In Love With You / Motherless Child (live)	7"
Light in the Attic	LITA 45-017	Serge Gainsbourg & Jane Birkin / Jane Birkin	La Chanson De Slogan b/w Orang Outan	7"
Light in the Attic	LITA 45-018	Rodriguez	Inner City Blues - Live In The Streets Of Paris - June 12, 2009 b/w I'm Gonna Live Till I Die - Live at The Triple Door In Seattle, WA - June 23, 2009	7"
Light in the Attic	LITA 45-019	Pastor T. L. Barrett And The Youth For Christ Choir	Jingle Bells (Pt.I) b/w Jingle Bells (Pt. II)	7"
Light in the Attic	LITA 45-020	Iggy Pop & Zig Zags / Betty Davis	If I'm In Luck I Might Get Picked Up b/w If I'm In Luck I Might Get Picked Up	7"
Light in the Attic	LITA 45-021	Charles Bradley and the Menahan Street Band / Rodriguez	I'll Slip Away b/w I'll Slip Away	7"
Light in the Attic	LITA 45-022	Sweet Tea / Wendy Rene	After Laughter (Comes Tears) b/w After Laughter (Comes Tears)	7"
Light in the Attic	LITA 45-023	Ariel Pink's Haunted Graffiti & Dâm-Funk / Donnie & Joe Emerson	Baby b/w Baby	7"
Light in the Attic	LITA 45-024	Gold Leaves / Lee Hazlewood	Won't You Tell Your Dreams b/w Won't You Tell Your Dreams	7"
Light in the Attic	LITA 45-025	Mark Lanegan / Karen Dalton	Same Old Man b/w Same Old Man	7"
Light in the Attic	LITA 45-027	Roky Erickson And The Aliens	Mine Mine Mind b/w Bloody Hammer	7"
Light in the Attic	LITA 45-028	Public Image Limited	Public Image b/w Cowboy Song	7"
Light in the Attic	LITA 45-029	Roky Erickson	Bermuda, Burn The Flames b/w I'm A Demon, The Beast	7"
Light in the Attic	LITA 45-030	Suzi Jane Hokom / Lee Hazlewood	For A Day Like Today (Take Flour) b/w Sweet Ride	7"
Light in the Attic	LITA 45-030	Lee Hazlewood	LHI In Session 1966-1970	7" (flexi)
Light in the Attic	LITA 45-031	Donnie & Joe Emerson	Jingle Demo Reel	7"
Light in the Attic	LITA 45-033	Donnie & Joe Emerson	Searching b/w Finally Found Someone	7"
Light in the Attic	LITA 45-034	Lizzy Mercier Descloux	Fire b/w Morning High (duet w/ Patti Smith)	7"
Light in the Attic / Munster Records	LITA 45-035 / MR 7274	Alan Vega, Alex Chilton, Ben Vaughn	Candyman b/w Lover Of Love	7"
Light in the Attic	LITA 45-036	Tiger Joanie Scott	Baby I Need Your Lovin' b/w Kansas City	7"
Light in the Attic	LITA 45-037	The Shaggs	Sweet Maria b/w The Missouri Waltz (Missouri State Song)	7"
Light in the Attic	LITA 45-038	Mac DeMarco / Haruomi Hosono	Honey Moon b/w Honey Moon	7"
Light in the Attic	LITA 45-039	BADBADNOTGOOD / Majestics	Key To Love (Is Understanding) b/w Key To Love (Is Understanding)	7"
Light in the Attic	LITA 45-040	Mark Anthony & Lyte Speed	I'm Just A Boogie Roller b/w I'm Just A Boogie Roller (Part 2)	7"
Light in the Attic	LITA 45-041	The Black On White Affair	Auld Lang Syne	7" (flexi)
Light in the Attic	LITA 45-044	Leslie Winer & Maxwell Sterling / Tim Buckley	Once I Was b/w Once I Was	7"
Light in the Attic	LITA 45-046	Donnie & Joe Emerson	Baby	7"
Light in the Attic	LITA 45-052	Nancy Sinatra & Lee Hazlewood	Some Velvet Morning b/w Tired of Waiting For You	7"
Light in the Attic / Drag City	LITA 45-053	Bill Callahan & Bonnie Prince Billy / Johnny Frierson	Miracles b/w Miracles	7"
Light in the Attic	LITA 45-054	Roky Erickson	Love Hieroglyphics	7" (flexi)
Light in the Attic	LITA 45-055	Jim Sullivan	U.F.O. b/w Jerome	7"
Light in the Attic	LITA 45-056	Lou Reed	Gee Whiz 1958-1964	7"
Light in the Attic	LITA 45-057	Angel Olsen / Karen Dalton	Something On Your Mind b/w Something On Your Mind	7"
Light in the Attic	LITA 45-058	Karen Dalton	Something On Your Mind b/w One Night Of Love	7"
Light in the Attic	LITA 45-059	Karen Dalton	One Night of Love - Live at Beat Club, Germany, April 21, 1976 b/w Take Me - Live at Beat Club, Germany, April 21, 1976	7"
Light in the Attic	LITA 45-060	Nancy Sinatra	Something Pretty b/w You Only Live Twice	7"
Light in the Attic	LITA 45-061	Lou Reed	I'm Waiting For The Man (May 1965 Demo)	7" (flexi)
Light in the Attic	LITA 45-062	Nancy Sinatra	Longtime Woman (Early Alt. Version)	7" (flexi)
Light in the Attic	LITA 12-001	Sharpshooters	Danger In Your Eyes	12"
Light in the Attic	LITA 12-002	Sharpshooters	Love Walked Past (Remixed)	12"
Light in the Attic	LITA 12-003	Madlib / Mellow / Sharpshooters / Chris Geddes & Hush Puppy	Redesigned • The Remix EP Vol. 1	12"
Light in the Attic	LITA 12-004	Danger Mouse & Murs / Nobody feat. Ikey Owens / Stereolab & The High Llamas / Super Furry Animals / Caribou	Redesigned • The Remix EP Vol. 2	12"
Light in the Attic	LITA 12-005	Kid Koala & Dynomite D. / Styrofoam & Sarah Shannon / The Free Design / Koushik & Dudley Perkins / Koushik / Paddy / The Free Design	Redesigned • The Remix EP Vol. 3	12"
Light in the Attic	LITA 12-006	Karen Dalton	Live at The Montreux Golden Rose Pop Festival, May 1971	12"
Light in the Attic	LITA ZINE NO 1	Light in the Attic Zine	Light in the Attic Zine - Issue 1 (2009)	Zine
Light in the Attic	LITA ZINE NO 2	Light in the Attic Zine	Light in the Attic Zine - Issue 2 (2010)	Zine
Light in the Attic	LITA ZINE NO 3	Light in the Attic Zine	Light in the Attic Zine - Issue 3 (2011)	Zine
Light in the Attic	LITA ZINE NO 4	Light in the Attic Zine	Light in the Attic Zine - Issue 4 (2012)	Zine
Light in the Attic	LITA ZINE NO 5	Light in the Attic Zine	Light in the Attic Zine - Issue 5 (2013)	Zine
Light in the Attic	LITA ZINE NO 6	Light in the Attic Zine	Light in the Attic Zine - Issue 6 (2014)	Zine
Light in the Attic	LITA ZINE NO 7	Light in the Attic Zine	Light in the Attic Zine - Issue 7 (2015)	Zine
Light in the Attic	LITA ZINE NO 8	Light in the Attic Zine	Light in the Attic Zine - Issue 8 (2016)	Zine
Light in the Attic	LITA ZINE NO 9	Light in the Attic Zine	Light in the Attic Zine - Issue 9 (2017)	Zine
Light in the Attic	LITA ZINE NO 10	Light in the Attic Zine	Light in the Attic Zine - Issue 10 (2018)	Zine
Light in the Attic	LITA ZINE NO 11	Light in the Attic Zine	Light in the Attic Zine - Issue 11 (2019)	Zine
Cinewax	CINE 800	Various Artists	Winter's Bone Original Motion Picture Soundtrack	
Cinewax	CINE 801	Dickon Hinchliffe	Winter's Bone (Original Score)	
Cinewax	CINE 802	Wheedle's Groove (Movie)	Wheedle's Groove (Movie)	
Cinewax	CINE 803	Dickon Hinchliffe	Project Nim Original Motion Picture Soundtrack	
Cinewax	CINE 804	The Wonderland Philharmonic	Shogun Assassin Original Motion Picture Soundtrack	
Cinewax	CINE 805	Various Artists	Low Down Original Soundtrack	
Cinewax	CINE 806	Kurt Stenzel	Jodorowsky's Dune Original Motion Picture Soundtrack	
Cinewax	CINE 807	Jerry Goldsmith	Chinatown Original Motion Picture Soundtrack	
Cinewax	CINE 808	Various Artists	Dennis Hopper In "The American Dreamer"	
Cinewax	CINE 809	Various Artists	Ciao! Manhattan Original Motion Picture Soundtrack	
Cinewax / Volcom Stone	CINE 810 / VS0001	Various Artists	Psychic Migrations	
Cinewax	CINE 811	Various Artists	BLAZE Original Cast Recording	
Modern Classics Recordings	MCR 900	Mercury Rev	Deserter's Songs	
Modern Classics Recordings	MCR 901	Morphine	Cure For Pain	
Modern Classics Recordings	MCR 902	D'Angelo	Voodoo	
Modern Classics Recordings	MCR 903	Big Boys	Where's My Towel / Industry Standard	
Modern Classics Recordings	MCR 904	Mercury Rev	Deserted Songs	
Modern Classics Recordings	MCR 905	Digable Planets	Blowout Comb	
Modern Classics Recordings	MCR 906	Seefeel	Quique	
Modern Classics Recordings	MCR 907	Built to Spill	Ultimate Alternative Wavers	
Modern Classics Recordings	MCR 908	Big Boys	Lullabies Help The Brain Grow	
Modern Classics Recordings	MCR 909	Big Boys	No Matter How Long The Line At The Cafeteria, There's Always A Seat	
Modern Classics Recordings	MCR 910	Willie Nelson	Teatro	
Modern Classics Recordings	MCR 911	Tinariwen	Radio Tisdas Sessions	
Modern Classics Recordings	MCR 912	Tinariwen	Amassakoul	
Modern Classics Recordings	MCR 913	David Kauffman and Eric Caboor	Songs From Suicide Bridge	
Modern Classics Recordings	MCR 914	Stone Roses	Stone Roses	
Modern Classics Recordings	MCR 915	Stone Roses	Turns Into Stone	
Modern Classics Recordings	MCR 916	This Heat	This Heat	
Modern Classics Recordings	MCR 917	This Heat	Deceit	
Modern Classics Recordings	MCR 918	This Heat	Health and Efficiency	
Modern Classics Recordings / Munster Records	MCR 919 / MR 356	Lee Robinson Machine	Family Album	
Modern Classics Recordings	MCR 920	Willie Nelson	Teatro - The Complete Sessions	
Modern Classics Recordings	MCR 921	Camberwell Now	The Ghost Trade	
Modern Classics Recordings	MCR 922	Camberwell Now	The EP Collection	
Modern Classics Recordings	MCR 923	Gigi Masin & Charles Hayward	Les Nouvelles Musiques De Chambre Volume 2	
Modern Classics Recordings	MCR 924	Digable Planets	Reachin’ (A New Refutation of Time and Space)	
Modern Classics Recordings	MCR 925	Willie Nelson	Spirit	
Modern Classics Recordings	MCR 926	This Heat	Made Available	
Modern Classics Recordings	MCR 927	This Heat	Repeat / Metal	
Modern Classics Recordings	MCR 928	This Heat	Live 80 - 81	
Modern Classics Recordings	MCR 929	Morphine	Like Swimming	
Modern Classics Recordings	MCR 930	Morphine	The Night	
Future Days Recordings	FDR 600	Bo Diddley	The Black Gladiator	
Future Days Recordings	FDR 601	Annette Peacock	I'm The One	
Future Days Recordings	FDR 602	Bobby Whitlock	Where There's A Will There's A Way	
Future Days Recordings	FDR 603	Michael Hurley	Armchair Boogie	
Future Days Recordings	FDR 604	Michael Hurley	Hi Fi Snock Uptown	
Future Days Recordings	FDR 605	Bobby Whitlock	Bobby Whitlock	
Future Days Recordings	FDR 606	Bobby Whitlock	Raw Velvet	
Future Days Recordings	FDR 607	Grateful Dead	One From The Vault	
Future Days Recordings	FDR 608	Grateful Dead	Two From The Vault	
Future Days Recordings	FDR 609	Grateful Dead	Three From The Vault	
Future Days Recordings	FDR 610	Thin Lizzy	Shades Of A Blue Orphanage	
Future Days Recordings	FDR 611	Thin Lizzy	Vagabonds Of The Western World	
Future Days Recordings	FDR 612	Goldberg	Misty Flats	
Future Days Recordings	FDR 613	The Family Of Apostolic	The Family Of Apostolic	
Future Days Recordings	FDR 614	Françoise Hardy	Tous Les Garçons Et Les Filles	
Future Days Recordings	FDR 615	Françoise Hardy	Le Premier Bonheur Du Jour	
Future Days Recordings	FDR 616	Françoise Hardy	Mon Amie La Rose	
Future Days Recordings	FDR 617	Françoise Hardy	L’Amitié	
Future Days Recordings	FDR 618	Françoise Hardy	La Maison Ou J’Ai Grandi	
Future Days Recordings	FDR 619	Willie Thrasher	Spirit Child	
Future Days Recordings	FDR 620	John Angaiak	I’m Lost In The City	
Future Days Recordings	FDR 621	Morley Loon	Northland, My Land	
Future Days Recordings	FDR 622	Third Power	Believe	
Future Days Recordings	FDR 623	Jim Dickinson	Dixie Fried	
Future Days Recordings	FDR 624	Various Artists	Loma: A Soul Music Love Affair, Volume One: Something’s Burning 1964-68	
Future Days Recordings	FDR 625	Various Artists	Loma: A Soul Music Love Affair, Volume Two: Get In The Groove 1965-68	
Future Days Recordings	FDR 626	Various Artists	Loma: A Soul Music Love Affair, Volume Three: Sad, Sad Feeling 1964-68	
Future Days Recordings	FDR 627	Various Artists	Loma: A Soul Music Love Affair, Volume Four: Sweeter Than Sweet Things 1964-68	
Future Days Recordings	FDR 629	Terry Reid	The Other Side Of The River	
Future Days Recordings	FDR 630	Lee Moses	Time and Place	
Future Days Recordings	FDR 631	Tim Buckley	Lady, Give Me Your Key: The Unissued 1967 Solo Acoustic Sessions	
Future Days Recordings	FDR 632	Goldberg	Winter / Summer	
Future Days Recordings	FDR 633	Link Wray	Link Wray	
Future Days Recordings	FDR 634	Robb Kunkel	Abyss	
Future Days Recordings	FDR 635	Lee Moses	How Much Longer Must I Wait? Singles & Rarities 1965-1972	
Future Days Recordings	FDR 636	Pete Jolly	Seasons	
