= Earth, Roots and Water =

Canadian reggae band

- Origin: Toronto, Ontario, Canada
- Genres: Reggae; dub
- Years active: 1970s
- Labels: Summer Records
- Past members: Adrian "Homer" Miller; Anthony "Base" Hibbert; Colin "Zuba" Subban; Matt Shelley; Tony "KB" Moore

Earth, Roots and Water was a Canadian reggae band from Toronto, Ontario, active in the 1970s. A house band for Summer Records, the group collaborated with several notable Jamaican reggae musicians.

== History ==
Earth, Roots and Water was founded in the mid-1970s as a house band for Jerry Brown's Summer Records studio, built in the basement of his Malton, Ontario home. The band was composed of Adrian "Homer" Miller (vocals), Anthony "Base" Hibbert (bass), Colin "Zuba" Subban (drums), Matt Shelley (guitar) and Tony "KB" Moore (keyboards). The members were described as "mostly from Jamaica, but also a few Jamaicans from England and even one local kid." The band provided a dub-heavy sound for several prominent reggae musicians, including Jackie Mittoo, King Jammy, Johnny Osbourne and Stranger Cole.

In 1977, Earth, Roots and Water's album, Innocent Youths, was released on Summer Records. Although only 500 pressings of the album were made, one copy was given to Sting when the band opened for The Police in Toronto. As a live band, Earth, Roots and Water gained notoriety in Toronto's reggae and punk scenes. In 1978, the band received recognition from Billboard, who called their sound "disco-reggae".

In 2008, Light in the Attic Records released a remastered version of Innocent Youths, which received positive reviews from music critics.

== Discography ==
- Innocent Youths (1977)
