= Cherry Smiles – The Rare Singles =

Compilation album by Nancy Sinatra
- Released: September 22, 2009
- Genre: Rock; pop; country
- Label: Boots Enterprises
- Producer: Nancy Sinatra; Daniel Hoal; Billy Strange; Lee Hazlewood; Jimmy Bowen; Snuff Garrett; Charlie Calello; L. Russell Brown; Andy Wickham; Lenny Waronker

Nancy Sinatra chronology
Nancy Sinatra (2004)	Cherry Smiles – The Rare Singles (2009)	Shifting Gears (2013)

Cherry Smiles – The Rare Singles is a digital only compilation of singles and B-sides released by Nancy Sinatra for Reprise Records, RCA Records, Private Stock Records, Elektra Records from 1970 to 1980. Ten of the tracks were previously only available on 45 RPM singles, and two tracks were previously unavailable in any format. Cherry Smiles features contributions from Ry Cooder and Duane Eddy, as well as a duet with Lee Hazlewood. It was released September 22, 2009, by Sinatra's own company, Boots Enterprises.

== Track listing ==
No.	Title	Writer(s)	Length
1.	"Machine Gun Kelly"	Daniel Kortchmar	3:18
2.	"Dolly And Hawkeye"	Lena Edling	4:28
3.	"Indian Summer (l'été Indien)"	Salvatore Cutugno, Graham Stuart Johnson, Pasquale Losito, Vito Pallavicini	4:28
4.	"Ain't No Sunshine"	Bill Withers	2:43
5.	"Let's Keep It That Way"	Curly Putman / Rafe Van Hoy	3:11
6.	"There Ain't No Way"	Roland Kent LaVoie	3:27
7.	"One Jump Ahead Of The Storm"	Joe New / Troy Seals	3:13
8.	"I'm Not A Girl Anymore"	Shelby Flint	3:01
9.	"She Played Piano and He Beat The Drums"	John Durrill	3:11
10.	"Southern Lady"	Michael E. Hazlewood	2:46
11.	"A Gentle Man Like You"	Danny Hice / Ruby Hice	2:55
12.	"Annabell Of Mobile"	Bobby Russell	3:10
13.	"Is Anybody Goin' to San Antone"	Dave Kirby / Glenn Martin	3:24
14.	"Glory Road"	Neil Diamond	3:52

== Original releases ==
#	Year	Song	Producer	Label	Note
1	2004	"Machine Gun Kelly"	Lee Hazlewood	Reprise Records	Recorded 03/06/1972. Previously released on UK only compilation The Very Best of Nancy Sinatra.
2	1976	"Dolly And Hawkeye"	Lee Hazlewood	Private Stock Records	B-side of "Indian Summer (l'été Indien)"
3	1976	"(L'été Indien) Indian Summer	Lee Hazlewood	Private Stock Records	Previously unreleased extended version
4	1973	"Ain't No Sunshine"	'Jimmy Bowen	RCA Records	B-side of "Sugar Me"
5	1980	"Let's Keep It That Way"	Jimmy Bowen, Billy Strange	Elektra Records	A-side
6	2009	"There Ain't No Way"	Jimmy Bowen	Boots Enterprises	Previously unreleased. Recorded 02/01/1973
7	1980	"One Jump Ahead Of The Storm"	Jimmy Bowen	Elektra Records	B-side of "Let's Keep It That Way"
8	1970	"I'm Not A Girl Anymore"	Billy Strange	Reprise Records	B-side of "How Are Things In California?"
9	1975	"She Played Piano and He Beat the Drums"	Snuff Garrett	Private Stock Records	B-side of "Annabell of Mobile"
10	2009	"Southern Lady"	Snuff Garrett	Boots Enterprises	Previously unreleased. Recorded 04/10/1975
11	1977	A Gentle Man Like You	Charlie Calello, L. Russell Brown	Private Stock Records	B-side of "It's for My Dad"
12	1975	"Annabell of Mobile"	Snuff Garrett	Private Stock Records	A-side
13	1971	"Is Anybody Goin' to San Antone?"	Andy Wickham, Lenny Waronker	Reprise Records	B-side of "Hook and Ladder". 2009 remix
14	1971	"Glory Road"	Andy Wickham, Lenny Waronker	Reprise Records	A-side
