= Summer Wine =

Song by Lee Hazelwood

"Summer Wine" is a song written by Lee Hazlewood. Hazlewood originally performed it with Suzi Jane Hokom, but it was his 1967 version with Nancy Sinatra that would prove more successful. In 1969 Lee Hazlewood performed the song on Swedish television with Swedish singer Siw Malmkvist on the Together programme, which was also shown at Montreux festival.

== Lyrics ==
Lyrically, "Summer Wine" describes a man, voiced by Hazlewood, who meets a woman, Hokom/Sinatra, who notices his silver spurs and invites him to have wine with her. After heavy drinking, the man awakens hungover to find his spurs and money have been stolen by the mysterious woman. He then declares a longing for more of her "wine".

== Nancy Sinatra and Lee Hazlewood version ==
"Summer Wine"

Single by Nancy Sinatra and Lee Hazlewood

from the album Nancy in London
- A-side: "Sugar Town"
- Released: December 1966
- Genre: Psychedelia
- Length: 3:40
- Label: Reprise
- Songwriter: Lee Hazlewood

Nancy Sinatra singles chronology
"In Our Time" (1966)	"Summer Wine" (1966)	"Somethin' Stupid" (1967)

The Nancy & Lee version was originally released on Sinatra's Nancy in London album in late 1966 and later as the B-side of her "Sugar Town" single in December 1966. The song itself became a hit, reaching No. 49 on Billboard's Hot 100 chart in April 1967. It also reached No. 14 in Australia. In early 1968, "Summer Wine" was included on Sinatra and Hazlewood's album of duets, Nancy & Lee LP. It was the first of Sinatra and Hazlewood's string of hit duets.

The original single was in mono, and the stereo LP versions had vocals only in the right channel. A new stereo remix with centered vocals debuted on the 1986 Nancy Sinatra compilation CD The Hit Years, and has appeared on several other releases since then. This version runs 4:14.

In May 2017, retail clothier H&M used Nancy & Lee's version in their "The Summer Shop 2017" ad campaign and as a result, the track debuted at No. 1 on Billboard magazine and Clio's Top TV Commercials chart for May 2017.

=== Charts ===
Chart (1967)	Peak position
Australia (ARIA)	14
Austria (Ö3 Austria Top 40)	6
US Billboard Hot 100	49

== Notable covers ==
A cover version by Ville Valo & Natalia Avelon, recorded for the soundtrack of Das Wilde Leben, was the fourth highest-selling single of 2007 in Germany and was certified Platinum by the BVMI. The Corrs and Bono have covered the song during the Corrs' VH1 Live in Dublin which came out on CD and is also available on streaming platforms. Also, a cover by Lana Del Rey exists, only available on Youtube.
