= Shifting Gears (Nancy Sinatra album) =

Studio album by Nancy Sinatra
- Released: December 3, 2013
- Genre: Rock, pop
- Length: 54:33
- Label: Boots Enterprises, Inc.
- Producer: Nancy Sinatra, Billy Strange, Michael Lloyd

Nancy Sinatra chronology
Cherry Smiles - The Rare Singles (2009)	Shifting Gears (2013)

Shifting Gears is the thirteenth studio album by Nancy Sinatra, released on Sinatra's own Boots Enterprises label in 2013.

The album is a collection of previously unissued recordings from her vaults featuring her renditions of "big" ballads with sources from Broadway of the 1920s to pop hits of the 1970s. Sinatra has said that she sequenced the songs to tell the story of a love affair.

== Track listing ==
Credits adapted from Nancy Sinatra's website.

Shifting Gears
No.	Title	Writer(s)	Source(s)	Length
1.	"As Time Goes By"	Herman Hupfeld	Everybody's Welcome; Casablanca	3:37
2.	"When I Look in Your Eyes"	Leslie Bricusse	Doctor Dolittle	2:56
3.	"Holly Holy"	Neil Diamond	Touching You, Touching Me	4:54
4.	"I'll Build a Stairway to Paradise"	B.G. (Buddy Gard) DeSylva; Arthur Francis; George Gershwin	George White's Scandals; An American in Paris	3:17
5.	"A Cockeyed Optimist" (Guitar Version, featuring Billy Strange)	Oscar Hammerstein II; Richard Rodgers	South Pacific (musical); South Pacific (film)	2:21
6.	"I Can See Clearly Now"	Johnny Nash	I Can See Clearly Now	2:54
7.	"Killing Me Softly with His Song"	Charles Fox; Norman Gimbel	Lori Lieberman	3:50
8.	"Play Me"	Neil Diamond	Moods	4:16
9.	"Something"	George Harrison	Abbey Road	3:13
10.	"MacArthur Park"	Jimmy Webb	A Tramp Shining	5:53
11.	"The Hungry Years"	Howard Greenfield; Neil Sedaka	The Hungry Years	4:03
12.	"A Cockeyed Optimist" (Orchestra Version)	Oscar Hammerstein II; Richard Rodgers	South Pacific (musical); South Pacific (film)	2:51
13.	"Why Did I Choose You?"	Michael Leonard; Herbert Edward Martin	The Yearling	2:55
14.	"I Don't Know How to Love Him"	Tim Rice; Andrew Lloyd Webber	Jesus Christ Superstar	4:20
15.	"We Need a Little Christmas"	Jerry Herman	Mame (musical); Mame (film)	3:12
Total length:				54:33
