= The Sinatra Family Wish You a Merry Christmas =

Studio album by Frank Sinatra and prominently featuring his children
- Released: September 1968
- Recorded: July 24 – August 12, 1968, Hollywood
- Genre: Traditional pop; Christmas
- Length: 33:31
- Label: Reprise; FS 1026
- Producer: Sonny Burke

Frank Sinatra chronology
Frank Sinatra's Greatest Hits (1968)	The Sinatra Family Wish You a Merry Christmas (1968)	Cycles (1968)

Professional ratings
Review scores
Source	Rating
Allmusic	3.5/5 stars

The Sinatra Family Wish You a Merry Christmas is a 1968 Christmas album by Frank Sinatra and featuring his children, Frank Sinatra Jr., Nancy Sinatra and Tina Sinatra.

The album was released on vinyl LP, reel to reel, and 8-track, and was out of print for decades before being re-released on CD in 1999 by Artanis Entertainment Group.

Frank Sr., Nancy and Tina recorded their contributions in the studio together. Frank Jr. was away on tour, and added his singing later to the pre-recorded tracks. The closing song, "The Twelve Days of Christmas", has different lyrics sung by Sinatra's children honoring their father with their gifts to him, with their father singing the final verse and chorus solo.

== Track listing ==
1. "I Wouldn't Trade Christmas" (Sammy Cahn, Jimmy Van Heusen) – 2:55
2. "It's Such a Lonely Time of Year" (Chip Taylor) – 4:38
3. "Some Children See Him" (Whila Hutson, Alfred Burt) – 2:59
4. "O Bambino (One Cold and Blessed Winter)" (Remo Capra, Tony Velona) – 2:59
5. "The Bells of Christmas (Greensleeves)" (Traditional; arranged by Sammy Cahn and Jimmy Van Heusen) – 3:41
6. "Whatever Happened to Christmas?" (Jimmy Webb) – 3:05
7. "Santa Claus Is Coming to Town" (John Frederick Coots, Haven Gillespie) – 2:35
8. "Kids" (Scott Davis) – 3:01
9. "The Christmas Waltz" (Sammy Cahn, Jule Styne) – 3:12
10. "The Twelve Days of Christmas" (Traditional; arranged by Sammy Cahn and Jimmy Van Heusen) – 4:26

== Personnel ==
- Frank Sinatra - Vocals (Tracks 1, 5, 6, 9, 10)
- Frank Sinatra Jr. - Vocals (Tracks 1, 3, 5, 10)
- Nancy Sinatra - Vocals (Tracks 1, 2, 4, 5, 8, 10)
- Tina Sinatra - Vocals (Tracks 1, 4, 5, 7, 10)
- Nelson Riddle - Arranger, Composer
- Don Costa - Arranger, Composer
- The Jimmy Joyce Singers - Vocals

Track 6:

25-July-1968 (Thursday) - New York. Columbia Recording Studio (from 2 to 6:30 P.M.).

Urbie Green, Johnny Messner, Buddy Morrow (tbn); Paul Faulise (b-tbn); Richard Berg, Fred Klein, Albert Richmond, Joseph De Angelis (fr-h); Fred Buldrini, Peter Buonconsiglio, Harry Katzman, George Ockner, Tosha Samaroff, Julius Schachter, Joe Malin, Felix Giglio, Stanley Karpienia, Carmel Malin, Alvin Rogers, Jesse Tryon (vln); Alfred Brown, Harold Furmansky, Emanuel Vardi, Norman Forrest (via); Maurice Brown, Charles McCracken, David Moore, Harry Wimmer (vlc); Robert Maxwell (harp); Ernest Hayes (p/cel); Ralph Casale, Al Casamenti, Bucky Pizzarelli (g); Frank Bruno (b); Nick Perito (accordion); Douglas Allan, Buddy Saltzman (d/perc); William Bronson, Lillian Clark, Harry Duvall, Corina Manetto, Ronald Martin, Linda November, James Ryan, Louise Stuart (voe - on all titles). Don Costa (arr - all titles).

Tracks 1, 5, 9, 10:

12-August-1968 (Monday) - Hollywood. Western Recorders (from 2 to 6:30 P.M.).

Irving Bush, Don Fagerquist, Shorty Sherock (tpt); Louis Blackbum, Bob Enevoldsen, Joe Howard (tbn); Vincent DeRosa, Alan Robinson, Gene Sherry (fr-h); Mahlon Clark, Bill Green, Lloyd Hildebrand, Joe Koch, Ethmer Roten, Gordon Schoneberg (wwd); Alex Beller, Emil Briano, John De Voogdt, Bonnie Douglas, Jacques Gasselin, Lou Klass, Robert Konrad, Irma Neumann, Lou Ra- derman, Paul Shure (vln); Allan Harshman, Alex Neiman, Barbara Simons (via); Naoum Benditzky, Paul Bergstrom, Joseph Saxon (vlc); Kathryn Julye (harp); Bill Miller (p); Ralph Grasso, Allan Reuss (g); Monty Budwig, Eddie Gilbert (b); Irving Cottler (d); Nick Pelico (perc); The Jimmy Joyce Singers: Jacqueline Allen, Billie Barnum, James Bryant, John Drake, Gerri Engemann, Carole Feraci, Fred Frank, Vicki Gratian, Betty Joyce, Jimmy Joyce, Harry Martin, Jay Meyer, Jay Riley, Paul Sjolund, Carol Turnbow, Marie Vernon, Clark Yocum.
