= Sugar Town =

1966 song written by Lee Hazlewood

- Norwegian 7" vinyl single cover

Single by Nancy Sinatra

from the album Sugar
- B-side: "Summer Wine"
- Released: October 1966
- Genre: Pop
- Length: 2:20
- Label: Reprise
- Songwriter: Lee Hazlewood
- Producer: Lee Hazlewood

Nancy Sinatra singles chronology
"In Our Time" (1966)	"Sugar Town" (1966)	"Somethin' Stupid" (1967)

"Sugar Town" is a song written by songwriter-producer Lee Hazlewood and first recorded by American singer Nancy Sinatra in 1966. As a single released under the Reprise label, it peaked at number five on the Billboard Hot 100 chart in December 1966, while reaching number one on the Easy Listening chart in January 1967. It became a gold record. The song was included on Nancy Sinatra's LP, Sugar, also released in 1966, and was featured in her 1967 TV special Movin' with Nancy, released on home video in 2000.

== Background ==
The song is an allusion to sugar cubes laced with lysergic acid diethylamide (LSD) although, like other songs Hazlewood wrote, "Sugar Town" was equivocal, speaking to a young audience able to recognize its allusion, yet outwardly tame enough to receive radio play. Hazlewood denied that he had ever used LSD, or regularly partaken in drugs in general. He explained:

You had to make the lyric dingy enough where the kids knew what you were talking about—and they did. Double entendre. But not much more if you wanted to get it played on the radio. We used to have lotsa trouble with lyrics, but I think it’s fun to keep it hidden a little bit.

The B-side to "Sugar Town" was "Summer Wine", a popular duet also written by Hazlewood, and featuring Hazlewood and Nancy Sinatra.

== Personnel ==
According to the AFM contract sheet, the following musicians played on the track.

- Billy Strange – listed as session leader
- Don Lanier – listed as session conductor
- Roy Caton
- Ollie Mitchell
- Don Randi
- Carol Kaye
- Don Bagley
- Lou Morell
- Al Casey
- Glen Campbell
- Gary Coleman
- Hal Blaine

== Cover versions ==
Hong Kong artist Nancy Sit covered the song, released as a single by Crane Brand Records in 1967.

In 2022, Mariano Garcia released an adaptation of this song as a single with the name "Tucumán". The lyrics allude to the province of Tucumán, Argentina, where the music video was shot.

== See also ==
- List of number-one adult contemporary singles of 1967 (U.S.)
- Sugar cubes as a medium for ingesting LSD
