= Nancy & Lee =

Studio album by Nancy Sinatra and Lee Hazlewood
- Released: March 1968
- Genre: Country pop; psychedelic pop
- Length: 35:36 (original); 42:09 (reissue)
- Label: Reprise (original); Light in the Attic (reissue)
- Producer: Lee Hazlewood

Nancy Sinatra and Lee Hazlewood chronology
Nancy & Lee (1968)	Nancy & Lee Again (1972)

Professional ratings
Review scores
Source	Rating
AllMusic	4/5 stars
Pitchfork	8.8/10

Nancy & Lee is a collaborative studio album by American singers Nancy Sinatra and Lee Hazlewood, released on Reprise Records in March 1968. Arranged and conducted by Billy Strange, the album was produced by Lee Hazlewood. It peaked at number 13 on the Billboard 200 chart. In 2017, Pitchfork placed it at number 87 on their "200 Best Albums of the 1960s" list.

== Singles ==
The album yielded three Billboard Hot 100 hits in 1967 — "Summer Wine" (no. 49; originally the B-side of Sinatra's solo late-1966/early 1967 no. 5 hit "Sugar Town"), "Jackson" (no. 14) and "Lady Bird" (no. 20) — and one in early 1968: "Some Velvet Morning" (no. 26). "Sand", the B-side of "Lady Bird", peaked at no. 107 on the Bubbling Under chart. All titles were credited to Nancy Sintatra & Lee Hazelwood except for "Summer Wine", which was credited to Nancy Sinatra with Lee Hazelwood.

"You've Lost That Lovin' Feelin'", credited to Nancy Sinatra/Lee Hazlewood, was released as a single in 1980 on Super Productions IRDA 638.

== Track listing ==
No.	Title	Writer(s)	Length
1.	"You've Lost That Lovin' Feelin'"	Phil Spector, Barry Mann, Cynthia Weil	3:23
2.	"Elusive Dreams"	Curly Putman, Billy Sherrill	3:12
3.	"Greenwich Village Folk Song Salesman"	Tom T. Hall	2:35
4.	"Summer Wine"	Lee Hazlewood	3:39
5.	"Storybook Children"	Chip Taylor, Billy Vera	3:10
6.	"Sundown, Sundown"	Hazlewood	2:35
7.	"Jackson"	Billy Edd Wheeler, Gaby Rodgers	2:46
8.	"Some Velvet Morning"	Hazlewood	3:45
9.	"Sand"	Hazlewood	3:41
10.	"Lady Bird"	Hazlewood	3:00
11.	"I've Been Down So Long (It Looks Like Up to Me)"	Hazlewood	2:49

== 2022 reissue ==
On May 20, 2022, Light in the Attic Records with the participation of Sinatra, released the first official reissue of Nancy & Lee. The remastered album was released in multiple formats including vinyl LP, CD, cassette, 8-track tape, and digital, and includes two bonus tracks from the album recording sessions.

No.	Title	Writer(s)	Length
12.	"Tired of Waiting for You"	Ray Davies	3:37
13.	"Love Is Strange"	Bo Diddley (writing as Ethel Smith)	3:19

== Charts ==
Chart performance for Nancy & Lee
Chart	Peak position
Norwegian Albums (VG-lista)	6
UK Albums (OCC)	17
US Billboard 200	13
