= Boots (album) =

Studio album by Nancy Sinatra
- Released: March 15, 1966
- Genre: Sunshine pop; rock; pop
- Length: 30:25
- Label: Reprise
- Producer: Lee Hazlewood

Nancy Sinatra chronology
Boots (1966)	How Does That Grab You? (1966)

Singles from Boots
- 1. "So Long, Babe" Released: 1965; 2. "These Boots Are Made for Walkin'" Released: December 16, 1965

Professional ratings
Review scores
Source	Rating
AllMusic	3/5 stars
Record Mirror	3/5 stars

Boots is the debut studio album by Nancy Sinatra, released by Reprise Records on March 15, 1966. Arranged and conducted by Billy Strange, the album was produced by Lee Hazlewood. It peaked at number 5 on the Billboard 200 chart. It includes "These Boots Are Made for Walkin'", which topped the Billboard Hot 100 chart and the UK Singles Chart.

Although not credited, Sinatra was backed by members of the Wrecking Crew on the recordings. It was certified Gold by the RIAA for sales for 500,000 copies in November of that year.

== Track listing ==
No.	Title	Writer(s)	Length
1.	"As Tears Go By"	Mick Jagger, Andrew Loog Oldham, Keith Richards	2:54
2.	"Day Tripper"	John Lennon, Paul McCartney	3:03
3.	"I Move Around"	Lee Hazlewood	2:51
4.	"It Ain't Me Babe"	Bob Dylan	2:04
5.	"These Boots Are Made for Walkin'"	Hazlewood	2:40
6.	"In My Room"	Lee Pockriss, Paul Vance	2:41
7.	"Lies"	Beau Charles, Buddy Randell	2:49
8.	"So Long, Babe"	Hazlewood	3:08
9.	"Flowers on the Wall"	Lew DeWitt	2:41
10.	"If He'd Love Me"	Miriam Eddy	2:47
11.	"Run for Your Life"	Lennon, McCartney	2:42

1995 reissue edition bonus tracks
No.	Title	Writer(s)	Length
12.	"The City Never Sleeps at Night"	Hazlewood	2:50
13.	"Leave My Dog Alone"	Hazlewood	2:09
14.	"In Our Time"	Hazlewood	2:36
15.	"These Boots Are Made for Walkin'" (Mono Single Version)	Hazlewood	2:43

2021 reissue edition bonus tracks
No.	Title	Writer(s)	Length
12.	"The City Never Sleeps at Night"	Hazlewood	2:56
13.	"For Some"	Bennie Benjamin · Sol Marcus	2:25

== Personnel ==
- Guitar: Nick Bonney, Al Casey, Jerry Cole, Louis Morell, Billy Strange, Tommy Tedesco
- Bass guitar: Carol Kaye
- Keyboards: Don Randi
- Drums: Hal Blaine, Jim Gordon
- Percussion: Eddie Brackett, Frank Capp, Emil Richards
- Saxophone: Plas Johnson
- French horn: Richard Perissi
- Double Bass: Don Bagley, Chuck Berghofer
- Trumpet: Roy Caton, Lew McCreary, Ollie Mitchell

== Charts ==
Chart	Peak position
UK Albums (OCC)	12
US Billboard 200	5
