= Woman (Nancy Sinatra album) =

Studio album by Nancy Sinatra
- Released: 1972
- Studio: Hollywood Sound Recorders, Los Angeles, California
- Genre: Pop
- Length: 31:03
- Label: RCA Victor
- Producer: Jimmy Bowen

Nancy Sinatra chronology
Nancy (1969)	Woman (1972)	This Is Nancy Sinatra (1972)

Professional ratings
Review scores
Source	Rating
AllMusic	2/5 stars

Woman is the seventh studio album by Nancy Sinatra, released on RCA Victor in 1972.

== Track listing ==
No.	Title	Writer(s)	Length
1.	"Kind of a Woman"	Jimmy George, Melody Perry	3:01
2.	"We Can Make It"	Don Dunn, Jim Stanley	4:01
3.	"One More Time"	Michael Fennelly	2:07
4.	"Fell in Love with a Poet"	Kim M. Carnes	3:12
5.	"Flowers"	Bobby Cole	3:40
6.	"I Call It Love"	A. Boersma, R. Leff, S. Boersma	2:56
7.	"There's a Party Goin' On"	Billy Sherrill, Glenn Sutton	2:44
8.	"I Used to Think It Was Easy"	Pat St. Clare	3:16
9.	"The Happiest Girl in the Whole U.S.A."	Donna Fargo	2:33
10.	"It's the Love (That Keeps It All Together)"	Kim M. Carnes	3:33

== Personnel ==
Credits adapted from liner notes.

- Nancy Sinatra – vocals
- Larry Muhoberac – arrangement
- Jimmy Bowen – production
