= Nancy Sinatra =

American singer (born 1940)

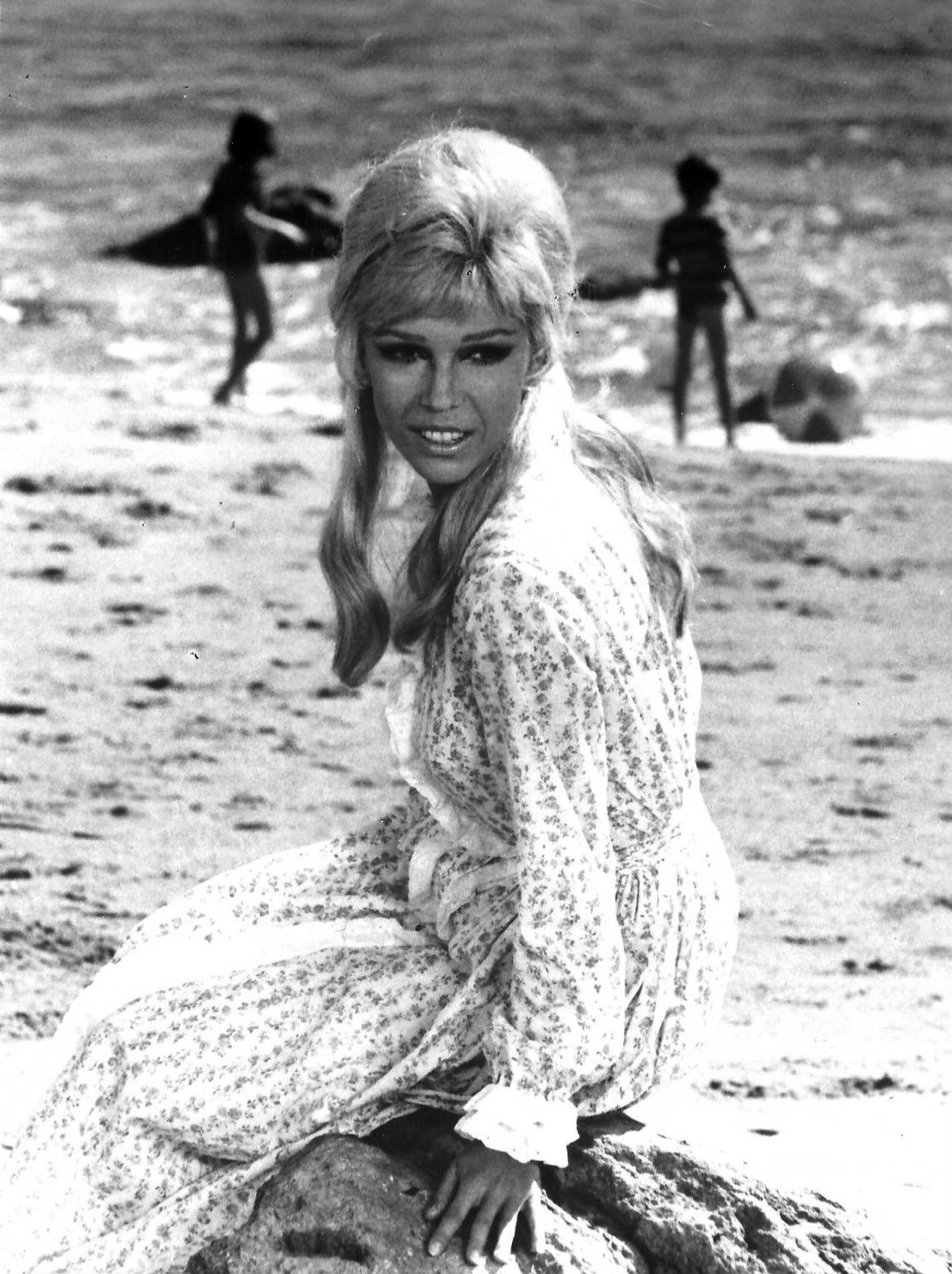
- Sinatra in her television special Movin' with Nancy, 1967
- Born: Nancy Sandra Sinatra; June 8, 1940 (age 86); Jersey City, New Jersey, U.S.
- Education: University High School
- Occupations: Singer; actress; film producer; author
- Years active: 1957–present
- Known for: Get Yourself a College Girl; For Those Who Think Young; The Ghost in the Invisible Bikini; Marriage on the Rocks
- Spouses: Tommy Sands (m. 1960; div. 1965); Hugh Lambert (m. 1970; died 1985)
- Children: 2, including AJ Lambert
- Father: Frank Sinatra
- Relatives: Frank Sinatra Jr. (brother); Tina Sinatra (sister); Anthony Martin Sinatra (grandfather); Dolly Sinatra (grandmother)
- Musical career
- Genres: Pop; rock; country
- Instrument: Vocals
- Labels: Boots Enterprises, Inc.; Reprise; RCA; Private Stock; Elektra; Cougar; Buena Vista; Attack
- Website: nancysinatra.com

Nancy Sandra Sinatra (born June 8, 1940) is an American singer, actress, film producer, and author. She is the elder daughter of Frank Sinatra and Nancy Sinatra (née Barbato) and is known for her 1966 signature hit "These Boots Are Made for Walkin'".

Nancy Sinatra began her career as a singer in November 1957 with an appearance on her father's ABC television variety series The Frank Sinatra Show, but initially achieved success only in Europe and Japan. In early 1966, she had a transatlantic number-one hit with "These Boots Are Made for Walkin'". A TV promotional clip from the era features Sinatra in high boots, accompanied by colorfully dressed go-go dancers, in what is now considered an iconic Swingin' 60s look. The song was written by Lee Hazlewood, who wrote and produced most of her hits and sang with her on several duets. As with all of Sinatra's 1960s hits, "Boots" featured Billy Strange as arranger and conductor.

Between early 1966 and early 1968, Sinatra charted on Billboard's Hot 100 with 14 titles, 10 of which reached the Top 40. In addition to "These Boots Are Made for Walkin'", defining recordings during this period include "Sugar Town", "Love Eyes", the transatlantic 1967 number-one "Somethin' Stupid" (a duet with her father), two versions of the title song from the James Bond film You Only Live Twice (1967), several collaborations with Lee Hazlewood – including "Summer Wine", "Jackson", "Lady Bird", and "Some Velvet Morning" – and a non-single 1966 cover of the Cher hit "Bang Bang (My Baby Shot Me Down)". In 1971, Sinatra and Hazlewood achieved their first collaborative success in the UK singles chart with the number-two hit "Did You Ever?" and the 2005 UK number-three hit by Audio Bullys, "Shot You Down", sampled Sinatra's version of "Bang Bang".

Between 1964 and 1968, Sinatra appeared in several feature films, co-starring with Peter Fonda in Roger Corman's biker-gang movie The Wild Angels (1966) and alongside Elvis Presley in the musical drama Speedway (1968). Frank and Nancy Sinatra played a fictional father and daughter in the 1965 comedy Marriage on the Rocks.

== Early life ==
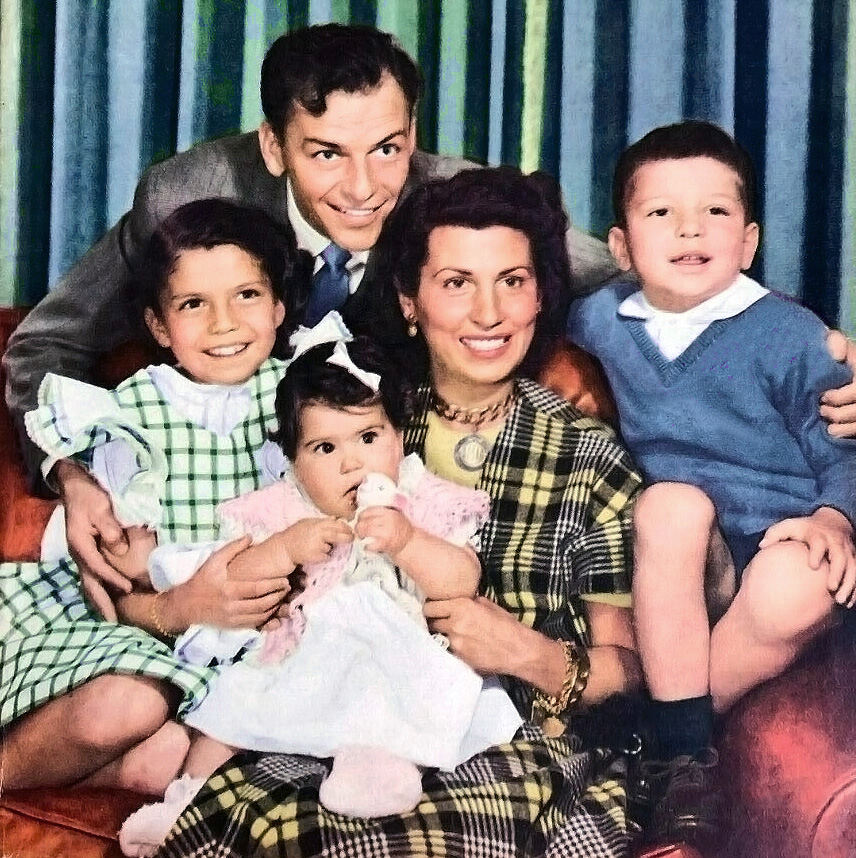
Sinatra family portrait, 1949, with Nancy at far left

Sinatra was born on June 8, 1940, in Jersey City, New Jersey. She is the eldest of the three children born to Frank Sinatra and his first wife, Nancy Barbato. Both of her parents were of Italian ancestry. When she was a toddler, the family moved to Hasbrouck Heights, New Jersey. They later moved again to Toluca Lake, California, for her father's Hollywood career. There, she spent many years in piano, dance, and dramatic performance lessons, and undertook months of voice lessons.

Jill St. John was one of Sinatra's elementary-school classmates and later dated her father. She graduated from University High School (Los Angeles) in June 1958.

== Career ==
=== 1950s and 1960s ===
Sinatra began to study music, dancing, and voice at UCLA in the late 1950s, but she dropped out after one year. She made her professional debut on her father's television show The Frank Sinatra Show in November 1957 and then appeared on his 1960 television special The Frank Sinatra Timex Show: Welcome Home Elvis, which celebrated the return of Elvis Presley from Europe following his discharge from military service. Nancy was sent to the airport on behalf of her father to welcome Presley when his plane landed. On the special, Sinatra and her father danced and sang a duet, "You Make Me Feel So Young/Old". That same year, she began a five-year marriage to Tommy Sands.

Sinatra was signed to her father's label, Reprise Records, in 1961. Her first single, "Cuff Links and a Tie Clip", went largely unnoticed. Her subsequent singles, though, charted in Europe and Japan. By 1965, without a hit in the United States, she was on the verge of being dropped by the label. Her singing career received a boost with the help of songwriter/producer/arranger Lee Hazlewood, who had been making records for 10 years, notably with Duane Eddy. Hazlewood's collaboration with Sinatra began when Frank Sinatra asked Lee to help boost his daughter's career. When recording "These Boots Are Made for Walkin'", Hazlewood is said to have suggested to Nancy, "You can't sing like Nancy Nice Lady anymore. You have to sing for the truckers." She later described him as "part Henry Higgins and part Sigmund Freud".

Hazlewood had Sinatra sing in a lower key and crafted songs for her. Bolstered by an image overhaul – including bleached-blond hair, frosted lips, heavy eye makeup, and Carnaby Street fashions – Sinatra made her mark on the American (and British) music scene in early 1966 with "These Boots Are Made for Walkin'", its title inspired by a line from Robert Aldrich's 1963 Western comedy 4 for Texas, starring Dean Martin and her father. One of her many hits written by Hazlewood, it received three Grammy Award nominations at the 9th Annual Grammy Awards, including two for Sinatra and one for arranger Billy Strange. It sold more than one million copies and was awarded a gold disc. A TV promotional clip featured Sinatra in high boots, accompanied by colorfully dressed go-go dancers, to iconic Swinging Sixties effect.

A run of chart singles followed, including two 1966 US Top Ten hits: "How Does That Grab You, Darlin'?" (number seven) and "Sugar Town" (number five), which became Sinatra's second million-seller. The ballad "Somethin' Stupid" – a duet with her father – reached number one in the US and the UK in April 1967 and spent nine weeks at the top of Billboard's easy listening chart. Frank and Nancy became the only father-daughter duo to top the Hot 100, but DJs dubbed the track "the incest song" because it was sung as if by two lovers. The record earned a Grammy Award nomination for Record of the Year at the 10th Annual Grammy Awards and remains the only father-daughter duet to hit number one in the US; it became Nancy's third million-selling record.

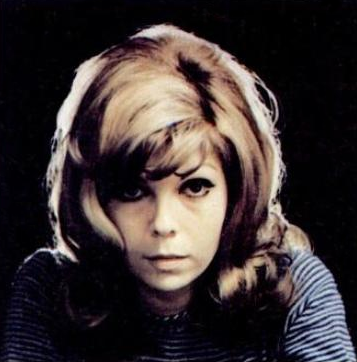
Sinatra in 1967

Other singles showcasing Sinatra's forthright delivery include "Friday's Child" (US number 36, 1966) and the 1967 hits "Love Eyes" (US number 15) and "Lightning's Girl" (US number 24). She rounded out 1967 with the low-charting "Tony Rome" (US number 83), the title track from the detective film Tony Rome starring her father. Her first solo single in 1968 was the more wistful "100 Years" (US number 69). That same year, she recorded "Highway Song", written by Kenny Young and produced by Mickie Most, for the European markets. The song reached the Top 20 in the UK and other European countries.

Sinatra enjoyed a parallel recording career, cutting duets with the husky-voiced, country-and-western-inspired Hazlewood, starting with "Summer Wine" (originally the B-side of "Sugar Town"). Their biggest hit was a cover of the 1963 country song "Jackson". The single peaked at number 14 on the Billboard Hot 100 in the summer of 1967, just a few months after Johnny Cash and June Carter Cash hit big on the country chart with their cover of the song.

Nancy Sinatra performs for American troops in Vietnam, with Jimmy Boyd in the background

In December 1967, Sinatra and Hazlewood released the single "Some Velvet Morning" (US number 26), accompanied by a promotional clip. The recording is regarded as one of pop's more unusual singles; critic Cathi Unsworth wrote, "The puzzle of its lyrics and otherworldly beauty of its sound [offer] seemingly endless interpretations." The British broadsheet The Daily Telegraph placed "Some Velvet Morning" atop its 2003 list of the Top 50 Best Duets Ever ("Somethin' Stupid" ranked no. 27.) The song appeared on the duo's 1968 album Nancy & Lee, about which National Public Radio commented in 2017, "... its sly, sultry movements both are a gem of traditional '60s pop and an inversion of traditional conceptions of romance."

Sinatra recorded the theme song for the James Bond film You Only Live Twice in 1967. In the liner notes of the CD reissue of her 1966 album Nancy In London, Sinatra states that she was "scared to death" of recording the song, and asked the songwriters Leslie Bricusse and John Barry: "Are you sure you don't want Shirley Bassey?" The two versions of the Bond theme include the lushly orchestrated track featured during the opening and closing credits of the film, and the more guitar-heavy version that appeared on the double A-sided single with "Jackson", though the Bond theme stalled at number 44 on the Billboard Hot 100. "Jackson"/"You Only Live Twice" was even more successful in the UK, reaching number 11 on the singles chart during a 19-week chart run (in the Top 50); it ranked 70th on the year-end chart.

Sinatra traveled to Vietnam to perform for US troops in 1966 and 1967. Many soldiers adopted her song "These Boots Are Made for Walkin'" as their anthem, as shown in Pierre Schoendoerffer's documentary The Anderson Platoon (1967) and reprised in a scene in Stanley Kubrick's Full Metal Jacket (1987). Sinatra recorded several antiwar songs, including "My Buddy", which was featured on her album Sugar, "Home", co-written by Mac Davis, and "It's Such a Lonely Time of Year", which appeared on the 1968 LP The Sinatra Family Wish You a Merry Christmas. Sinatra recreated her Vietnam concert appearances on a 1988 episode of the television show China Beach. Sinatra still performs for charitable causes supporting Vietnam veterans, including Rolling Thunder.

==== Films and television ====
Sinatra played a secretary in the 1963 Burke's Law episode "Who Killed Wade Walker?". She starred in three beach party films: For Those Who Think Young (1964), Get Yourself a College Girl (1964), and The Ghost in the Invisible Bikini (1966), performing songs in the latter film. After securing the role that eventually went to Linda Evans in Beach Blanket Bingo, she withdrew because the film's character is kidnapped – a parallel she found too close to actual events when her brother Frank Sinatra Jr. was kidnapped in December 1963.

Sinatra appeared as a guest with Woody Allen on the game show Password in 1965. She appeared as herself in The Oscar (1966) and also starred in The Last of the Secret Agents?, in which she sang the title song, and The Wild Angels the same year. She appeared in the 1968 Elvis Presley musical comedy Speedway, her final film.

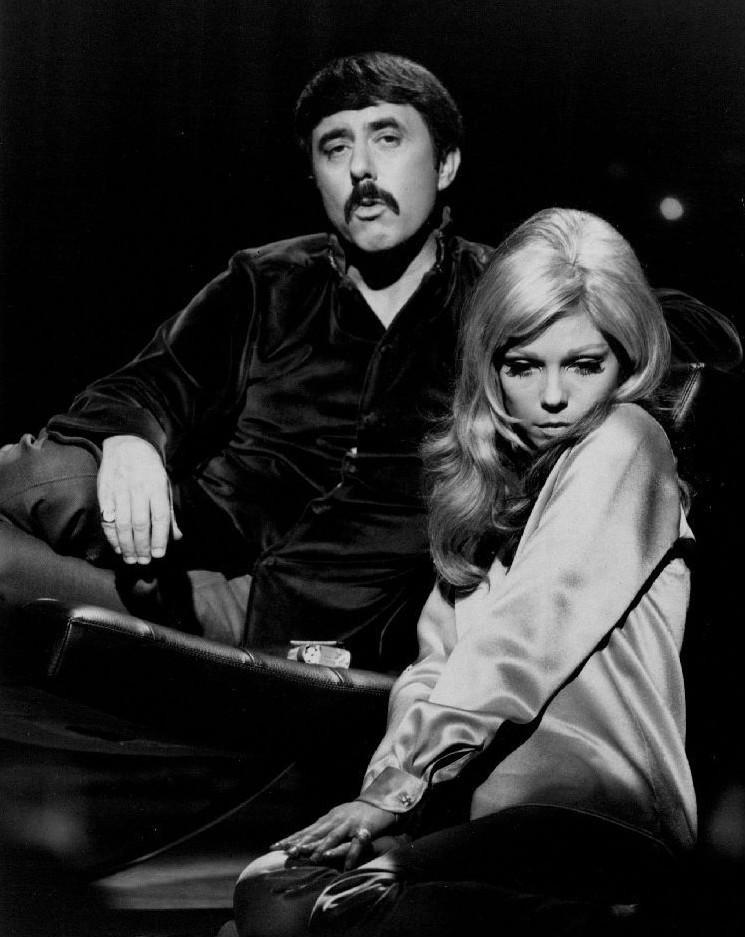
Nancy Sinatra and singer-songwriter Lee Hazlewood on The Hollywood Palace in 1968

Sinatra appeared on The Virginian, The Ed Sullivan Show, The Man from U.N.C.L.E., Rowan & Martin's Laugh-In, The Smothers Brothers Comedy Hour, and The Kraft Music Hall, hosted by Sandler & Young. She also appeared in her father's 1966 special A Man and His Music – Part II and a 1967 Christmas-themed episode of The Dean Martin Show, which featured the Sinatra and Martin families.

NBC aired Sinatra's own special, Movin' with Nancy, in 1967. It featured Lee Hazlewood, her father and his Rat Pack pals Dean Martin and Sammy Davis Jr., her brother Frank Sinatra Jr., and West Side Story dancer David Winters, who choreographed the show. Jack Haley Jr. directed and produced the special, for which he received an Emmy Award for Outstanding Directorial Achievement in Music or Variety at the 20th Primetime Emmy Awards. During the special, Sinatra shared a kiss with Davis Jr., about which she has stated, "The kiss [was] one of the first interracial kisses seen on television and it caused some controversy then, and now. [But] contrary to some inaccurate online reports, the kiss was unplanned and spontaneous." Winters was nominated for an Emmy in the Special Classification of Individual Achievements category for his choreography, but lost to co-winners The Smothers Brothers Comedy Hour and The Jackie Gleason Show. Movin' With Nancy was sponsored by RC Cola.

=== 1970s and 1980s ===
After leaving Reprise in 1970. Sinatra signed with RCA Records in 1971, resulting in three albums: Nancy & Lee – Again (1971), Woman (1972), and a compilation of some of her Reprise recordings called This Is Nancy Sinatra (1972). She released the non-LP single "Sugar Me" b/w "Ain't No Sunshine" in 1973. "Sugar Me" was written by Lynsey De Paul and Barry Blue, and with other covers of works by early-'70s popular songwriters, resurfaced on the 1998 album How Does It Feel?

In 1971, Sinatra and Hazlewood's duet "Did You Ever?" reached number two in the UK In 1972, they performed for a Swedish documentary, Nancy and Lee in Las Vegas, which chronicled their Las Vegas concerts at the Riviera Hotel and Casino and featured solo numbers and duets from concerts, behind-the-scenes footage, and scenes of Sinatra's mother and her husband, Hugh Lambert. The film did not appear until 1975.

By 1975, Sinatra was releasing singles on the Private Stock Records label. Among them were "Kinky Love", "Annabell of Mobile", "It's for My Dad", and "Indian Summer" (with Hazlewood). "Kinky Love" was banned by some radio stations for its suggestive lyrics. It appeared on Sheet Music: A Collection of Her Favorite Love Songs in 1998, and Pale Saints covered the song in 1991.

By the mid-1970s, Sinatra had slowed her musical activity and ceased acting to concentrate on her family. She returned to the studio in 1981 to record a country album with Mel Tillis called Mel & Nancy. Two of their songs made the Billboard country chart: "Texas Cowboy Night" (number 23) and "Play Me or Trade Me" (number 43).

In 1985, Sinatra wrote the book Frank Sinatra, My Father.

=== 1990s–present ===
At 54, Sinatra posed for Playboy in the May 1995 issue and made appearances on TV shows to promote her album One More Time. The magazine appearance caused some controversy. On the talk-show circuit, she said that her father was proud of the photos. Sinatra told Jay Leno on a 1995 Tonight Show that her daughters gave their approval, but her mother said that she should ask her father before committing to the project. Sinatra said that when she told her father what Playboy would be paying her, he said, "Double it".

In 1995, Nancy wrote the book Frank Sinatra, An American Legend. This was followed by an updated version in 1998 following Frank's death.

Taking her father's advice to own her masters, Sinatra owns or holds an interest in most of her material, including videos. Sinatra appeared live at the Edinburgh International Festival in August 2002. The sold-out, one-off concert was filmed by the BBC and later aired on BBC Four. She collaborated with former Los Angeles neighbor Morrissey on a 2004 version of his song "Let Me Kiss You", which was featured on her album Nancy Sinatra. The single – released the same day as Morrissey's version – charted at number 46 in the UK, providing Sinatra with her first hit in more than 30 years. The follow-up single, "Burnin' Down the Spark," failed to chart. The album featured U2, Sonic Youth, Calexico, Pete Yorn, Jon Spencer, Pulp's Jarvis Cocker, and Steven Van Zandt, all of whom have cited Sinatra as an influence. Each artist crafted a song for Sinatra to sing on the album. EMI released The Essential Nancy Sinatra, a UK-only greatest-hits compilation featuring the previously unreleased track, "Machine Gun Kelly", in 2006. The album was Sinatra's first to make the UK charts (number 73) since 1971's Did You Ever? reached number 31. Sinatra recorded "Another Gay Sunshine Day" for Another Gay Movie in 2006.

Sinatra received a star on the Hollywood Walk of Fame on May 11, 2006. A Golden Palm Star on the Palm Springs, California, Walk of Stars was dedicated to her in 2002.

Sinatra appeared as herself on one of the final episodes ("Chasing It") of the HBO mob drama The Sopranos. Her brother Frank Jr. had previously appeared in the 2000 episode "The Happy Wanderer". Sinatra and Anoushka Shankar recorded a 2007 public-service announcement for Deejay Ra's Hip-Hop Literacy campaign, encouraging reading of music and film-related books and screenplays. Sinatra's digital-only album Cherry Smiles: The Rare Singles, featuring previously unreleased tracks and songs only available as singles, was released in 2009. She released the 2013 digital-only album Shifting Gears, featuring 15 previously unreleased tracks, including a rendition of Neil Diamond's "Holly Holy". The orchestra tracks were recorded in the 1970s while Sinatra was touring with a 40-piece orchestra, and her vocal tracks were recorded within 10 years of the release of the collection. Sinatra's 1967 hit duet with Lee Hazlewood, "Summer Wine", was featured in retail apparel giant H&M's "The Summer Shop 2017" ad campaign.

In October 2020, Sinatra and Light in the Attic Records announced plans to release the Nancy Sinatra Archival Series. The first release was a Record Store Day Black Friday exclusive 7-inch vinyl single featuring two Sinatra/Hazlewood duets, "Some Velvet Morning" and "Tired of Waiting for You". A new 23-track compilation, Start Walkin' 1965–1976, followed in February 2021. The first single, a remastered reissue of Nancy and Lee's 1976 Private Stock single "Indian Summer", was released as a digital exclusive on October 21, 2020. Some of Sinatra's past albums were issued on CD for the first time, including her first record with Hazlewood, 1968's Nancy & Lee, and its follow-up, 1972's Nancy & Lee Again. Sinatra's debut album, Boots, was reissued on vinyl, picture disc, compact disc, 4-track, 8-track, and digital by Light In The Attic Records on September 17, 2021. The second wave of the Nancy Sinatra Archival Series kicked off on September 29, 2023 with the digital release of a new 25-song compilation Keep Walkin': Singles, Demos & Rarities 1965-1978. Its physical release followed on October 20, 2023. Sinatra participated in her first YouTube live chat on November 2, 2023.

== Political views ==
Sinatra has publicly stated her personal opposition to the affairs and presidency of U.S. President Donald Trump.

Sinatra has progressive positions on political issues, advocating for advances in women's rights, healthcare, and reversal of climate change.

=== Union activism ===
On March 30, 2012, the Screen Actors Guild (SAG) and the American Federation of Television and Radio Artists completed a merger of equals, forming a new union SAG-AFTRA. As a result of this merger, a group of actors including Sinatra, Michael Bell, Wendy Schaal, Schaal's former stepmother Valerie Harper, Clancy Brown, former SAG President Edward Asner, Martin Sheen, and Ed Harris immediately sued SAG President Ken Howard and several SAG vice presidents to overturn the merger and separate the merged unions because of their claims that the election was improper. The plaintiffs dropped their lawsuit several months later.

== Personal life ==
Marriages:

- Tommy Sands, 1960–1965 (divorced)
- Hugh Lambert, 1970–1985 (his death)

Children (with Lambert):

- Angela Jennifer "AJ" Lambert Paparozzi (whose godparents are James Darren and his second wife Evy Norlund)
- Amanda Catherine Lambert Erlinger

Both women were left US$1 million from their grandfather Frank Sinatra's will, in a trust fund started in 1983.

Between marriages, Nancy was engaged to producer Jack Haley Jr., who later married Liza Minnelli. She has also dated Michael Caine and Phil Spector. She also lived with architect David Clinton, who designed and built both of her homes in Beverly Hills.

== Discography ==
Solo studio albums

- Boots (1966)
- How Does That Grab You? (1966)
- Nancy in London (1966)
- Sugar (1967)
- Country, My Way (1967)
- Nancy (1969)
- Woman (1972)
- One More Time (1995)
- Nancy Sinatra (2004)

Compilation albums

- This is Nancy Sinatra (1972)
- Sheet Music (1998)
- How Does It Feel? (1999)
- California Girl (2002)
- Shifting Gears (2013)

Collaborative studio albums

- Nancy & Lee (with Lee Hazlewood) (1968)
- The Sinatra Family Wish You a Merry Christmas (with Frank Sinatra, Frank Sinatra Jr. and Tina Sinatra) (1968)
- Nancy & Lee Again (with Lee Hazlewood) (1972)
- Mel & Nancy (with Mel Tillis) (1981)
- Nancy & Lee 3 (with Lee Hazlewood) (2004)

Soundtracks

- Movin' With Nancy (1967)

== Filmography ==
=== Film ===
Year	Title	Role(s)	Notes
1964	For Those Who Think Young	Karen Cross	
1964	Get Yourself a College Girl	Lynne	
1965	Marriage on the Rocks	Tracy Edwards	
1966	The Ghost in the Invisible Bikini	Vicki	
1966	The Oscar	Herself	Cameo appearance
1966	The Last of the Secret Agents?	Micheline	
1966	The Wild Angels	Mike	
1968	Speedway	Susan Jacks	
2003	Mayor of the Sunset Strip	Herself	Documentary
2020	Jay Sebring....Cutting to the Truth	Herself	Documentary

=== Television ===
Year	Title	Role(s)	Notes
1958	The Frank Sinatra Show	Herself	2 episodes
1963	The Virginian	Cary	Episode: "If You Have Tears"
1963	Burke's Law	Jill Stacy	Episode: "Who Killed Wade Walker?"
1966	The Man from U.N.C.L.E.	Coco Cool	Episode: "The Take Me To Your Leader Affair"
1966	A Man and His Music – Part II	Herself	Special
1967	Movin' with Nancy	Herself	Special
1967	Off to See the Wizard	Jill (voice)	Episode: "Who's Afraid of Mother Goose?"
1988	China Beach	Herself	Episode: "Chao Ong"
2007	The Sopranos	Herself	Episode: "Chasing It"
2015	Sinatra: All or Nothing at All	Herself	Docuseries
