= How Does That Grab You, Darlin'? =

1966 song by Nancy Sinatra

Single by Nancy Sinatra

from the album How Does That Grab You?
- B-side: "I Move Around"
- Released: April 15, 1966
- Genre: Pop
- Length: 2:33
- Label: Reprise
- Songwriter(s): Lee Hazlewood

Nancy Sinatra singles chronology
| "These Boots Are Made for Walkin'" (1965) | "How Does That Grab You, Darlin'?" (1966) | "Friday's Child" (1966) |

"How Does That Grab You Darlin'?" is a song by American singer Nancy Sinatra. Written and produced by American singer Lee Hazlewood, it was released on April 15, 1966, as the first single from Nancy's second studio album How Does That Grab You?, peaking at No. 7 on the Billboard Hot 100, No. 2 on the Canadian RPM singles chart, No. 19 on the UK Singles Chart, and No. 4 on the Austrian chart.

== Background and composition ==
"How Does That Grab You, Darlin'?" is 2 minutes and 33 seconds long, in the key of E major with a tempo of 81 beats per minute.

In the lyrics, the singer says to the recipient that she is "leaving him behind" because of his decisions and habits. She says she's "going to go out and prowl", and calls the recipient a "smart-aleck tomcat" because he "runs (his) mouth" and "runs around (her) house". It is a lighthearted breakup song with country roots and southern influences. The song contains the same guitar groove from her previous single, "These Boots Are Made for Walkin'".

== Critical reception ==
A writer for NME wrote, "I'm sure most of the success of Nancy's last disc was due to the song and arrangement, and this new one's taking no chances. It's very much the mixture as before, except that the fascinating double-bass walk effect is replaced by a cotton-pickin' guitar gimmick. But the tambourine and shuffle rhythm are still there, and the melody's very similar." A writer for Record Mirror wrote, "Great guitar intro this time, then into the same tempo and rhythm as on 'These Boots Are Made for Walkin'. It's a similar song in many ways, but the personality is there, plus good brass, phrases, it's instrumentally gimmicky, melodically monotonous." A writer for Melody Maker said of it, "This record is exactly the same as 'Boots,' with slightly altered lyrics. Contains the same charm and gimmicks but gets a little boring towards the end. The horns have a Herb Alpert sound." A Cashbox writer described it as a "throbbingly rhythmic top-drawer follow-up, a romantic handclapper about a gal who serves notice on her boyfriend that their romance is through."

== Chart performance ==
"How Does That Grab You Darlin'?" debuted at number 49 on the Billboard Hot 100 on the week of April 23, 1966, peaked at number 7 and charted for 8 weeks. On the UK Singles Chart, it reached number 19, and also charted for 8 weeks. It also reached No. 2 on the Canadian RPM chart, No. 4 in Austria.
