= How Does That Grab You? =

Studio album by Nancy Sinatra
- Released: May 1966
- Genre: Pop
- Length: 33:26
- Label: Reprise
- Producer: Lee Hazlewood

Nancy Sinatra chronology
Boots (1966)	How Does That Grab You? (1966)	Nancy in London (1966)

Singles from How Does That Grab You?
- 1. "How Does That Grab You, Darlin'?" Released: 1966; 2. "Sand" Released: 1967; 3. "Lightning's Girl" Released: September 1967

Professional ratings
Review scores
Source	Rating
AllMusic	3.5/5 stars

How Does That Grab You? is the second studio album by Nancy Sinatra, released on Reprise Records in 1966. Arranged and conducted by Billy Strange, the album was produced by Lee Hazlewood. It peaked at number 41 on the Billboard 200 chart. The single, "How Does That Grab You, Darlin'?", reached number 7 on the Billboard Hot 100 chart, as well as number 19 on the UK Singles Chart.

== Track listing ==
No.	Title	Writer(s)	Length
1.	"Not the Lovin' Kind"	Lee Hazlewood	3:09
2.	"The Shadow of Your Smile"	Johnny Mandel, Paul Francis Webster	2:52
3.	"Sorry 'Bout That"	Baker Knight	3:00
4.	"Time"	Michael Merchant	3:30
5.	"Sand" (with Lee Hazlewood)	Hazlewood	3:46
6.	"Crying Time"	Buck Owens	3:32
7.	"My Baby Cried All Night Long"	Hazlewood	3:05
8.	"Let It Be Me"	Gilbert Bécaud, Manny Curtis, Pierre Delanoë	3:05
9.	"Call Me"	Tony Hatch	2:50
10.	"How Does That Grab You, Darlin'?"	Hazlewood	2:33
11.	"Bang Bang (My Baby Shot Me Down)"	Sonny Bono	2:42

1995 reissue edition bonus tracks
No.	Title	Writer(s)	Length
12.	"The Last of the Secret Agents"	Hazlewood	2:48
13.	"Until It's Time for You to Go"	Buffy Sainte-Marie	4:00
14.	"Lightning's Girl"	Hazlewood	2:56
15.	"Feelin' Kinda Sunday" (with Frank Sinatra)	Nino Tempo, Annette Tucker, Kathy Wakefield	2:51

== Charts ==
Chart	Peak position
UK Albums (OCC)	17
US Billboard 200	41
