= Nancy Sinatra (album) =

Studio album by Nancy Sinatra
- Released: September 28, 2004
- Genres: Rock, pop
- Length: 37:49
- Label: Attack Records
- Producers: A.J. Azzarto, Matt Azzarto, Joey Burns, J. D. Foster, Jarvis Cocker, Don Fleming

Nancy Sinatra chronology
California Girl (2002)	Nancy Sinatra (2004)	Bubblegum Girl, Vol. 1 (2005)

Nancy Sinatra is the twelfth studio album by Nancy Sinatra, released on Attack Records in 2004. It peaked at number 94 on the UK Albums Chart.

== Critical reception ==
Professional ratings
Aggregate scores
Source	Rating
Metacritic	68/100
Review scores
Source	Rating
AllMusic	4/5 stars
The Guardian	4/5 stars
Rolling Stone	3.5/5 stars
USA Today	2/4 stars

At Metacritic, which assigns a weighted average score out of 100 to reviews from mainstream critics, the album received an average score of 68, based on 16 reviews, indicating "generally favorable reviews".

David Peschek of The Guardian gave the album 4 stars out of 5, calling it "a late-period album that actually stands up with the best of a much-loved artist's work."

== Track listing ==
No.	Title	Writer(s)	Length
1.	"Burnin' Down the Spark"	Joey Burns	4:25
2.	"Ain't No Easy Way"	Jon Spencer	3:23
3.	"Don't Let Him Waste Your Time"	Jarvis Cocker	3:51
4.	"Don't Mean Nothing"	Pete Yorn	2:45
5.	"Momma's Boy"	Thurston Moore	3:03
6.	"Let Me Kiss You"	Morrissey, Alain Whyte	3:24
7.	"Baby Please Don't Go"	Steven Van Zandt	2:56
8.	"About a Fire"	Lanny Cordola, Tom Lilly	3:29
9.	"Bossman"	A.J. Azzarto, Matt Azzarto, Phil Burns, Andy Holt	2:59
10.	"Baby's Coming Back to Me"	Cocker	3:10
11.	"Two Shots of Happy, One Shot of Sad"	Bono, The Edge	4:24

== Personnel ==
Credits adapted from liner notes.

- Nancy Sinatra – vocals
- Morrissey – backing vocals
- Linda Fabio – backing vocals
- Pat Erickson – backing vocals
- Don Randi – piano
- Paul Niehaus – pedal steel guitar
- Joey Burns – guitar, string arrangement
- Johnny Reno – guitar, bass guitar, drum programming
- Richard Hawley – guitar, harmonica, lyre, vibraphone
- Jon Spencer – guitar, vocals
- Alain Whyte – guitar, backing vocals
- Boz Boorer – guitar
- Lanny Cordola – guitar
- Thurston Moore – guitar
- Randy Strom – guitar
- John DePatie – guitar
- Pete Yorn – bass guitar, harmonica, backing vocals
- Tom Lilly – bass guitar, keyboards, backing vocals
- Jim O'Rourke – bass guitar, percussion, piano
- Adam Clayton – bass guitar
- Gary Day – bass guitar
- Volker Zander – bass guitar
- Matt Azzarto – bass guitar
- Frank Fabio – bass guitar
- Sam Bardfeld – violin, string arrangement
- Christian Howes – violin
- Leah Coloff – cello
- Buford O'Sullivan – trombone
- Jacob Valenzuela – trumpet
- Martin Wenk – trumpet
- Dennis Diken – drums, percussion
- Larry Mullen Jr. – drums
- Pete Thomas – drums
- Miles Robinson – drums
- John Convertino – drums
- Fran Azzarto – drums
- Dean Butterworth – drums
- Jarvis Cocker – percussion
- Claudia Chopek – percussion
- A.J. Azzarto – percussion

== Charts ==
Chart	Peak position
French Albums (SNEP)	101
UK Albums (Official Charts)	94
UK Independent Albums (Official Charts)	20
