= Nancy in London =

Studio album by Nancy Sinatra
- Released: 1966
- Genre: Pop
- Length: 29:22
- Label: Reprise
- Producer: Lee Hazlewood

Nancy Sinatra chronology
How Does That Grab You? (1966)	Nancy in London (1966)	Sugar (1966)

Singles from Nancy in London
- 1. "Summer Wine" Released: 1966

Professional ratings
Review scores
Source	Rating
AllMusic	3/5 stars

Nancy in London is the third studio album by Nancy Sinatra, released on Reprise Records in 1966. Arranged and conducted by Billy Strange, the album was produced by Lee Hazlewood. It peaked at number 122 on the Billboard 200 chart.

== Track listing ==
No.	Title	Writer(s)	Length
1.	"On Broadway"	Jerry Leiber, Barry Mann, Mike Stoller, Cynthia Weil	2:43
2.	"The End"	Sid Jacobson, Jimmy Krondes	2:22
3.	"Step Aside"	Tommy Jennings	2:33
4.	"I Can't Grow Peaches on a Cherry Tree"	Estelle Levitt, Camille Monte	2:38
5.	"Summer Wine" (with Lee Hazlewood)	Lee Hazlewood	3:40
6.	"Wishin' and Hopin'"	Burt Bacharach, Hal David	2:49
7.	"This Little Bird"	John D. Loudermilk	2:07
8.	"Shades"	Hazlewood	2:15
9.	"The More I See You"	Mack Gordon, Harry Warren	2:28
10.	"Hutchinson Jail"	Hazlewood	2:47
11.	"Friday's Child"	Hazlewood	3:00

1995 reissue edition bonus tracks
No.	Title	Writer(s)	Length
12.	"100 Years"	Hazlewood	2:28
13.	"You Only Live Twice" (Single Version)	John Barry, Leslie Bricusse	2:55
14.	"Tony Rome"	Hazlewood	2:24
15.	"Life's a Trippy Thing" (with Frank Sinatra)	Howard Greenfield, Linda Laurie	2:42

== Charts ==
Chart	Peak position
US Billboard 200	122
