= Cheechoo =

Cheechoo is a Cree language surname. People with this surname include:

- Colin Cheechoo, former guitarist with the band Breach of Trust
- Jonathan Cheechoo, hockey player
- Lloyd Cheechoo, musician featured on the compilation album Native North America, Vol. 1
- Shirley Cheechoo, actress, artist and filmmaker
- Vern Cheechoo, musician
