= Willie Thrasher =

Canadian Inuk musician (born 1948)

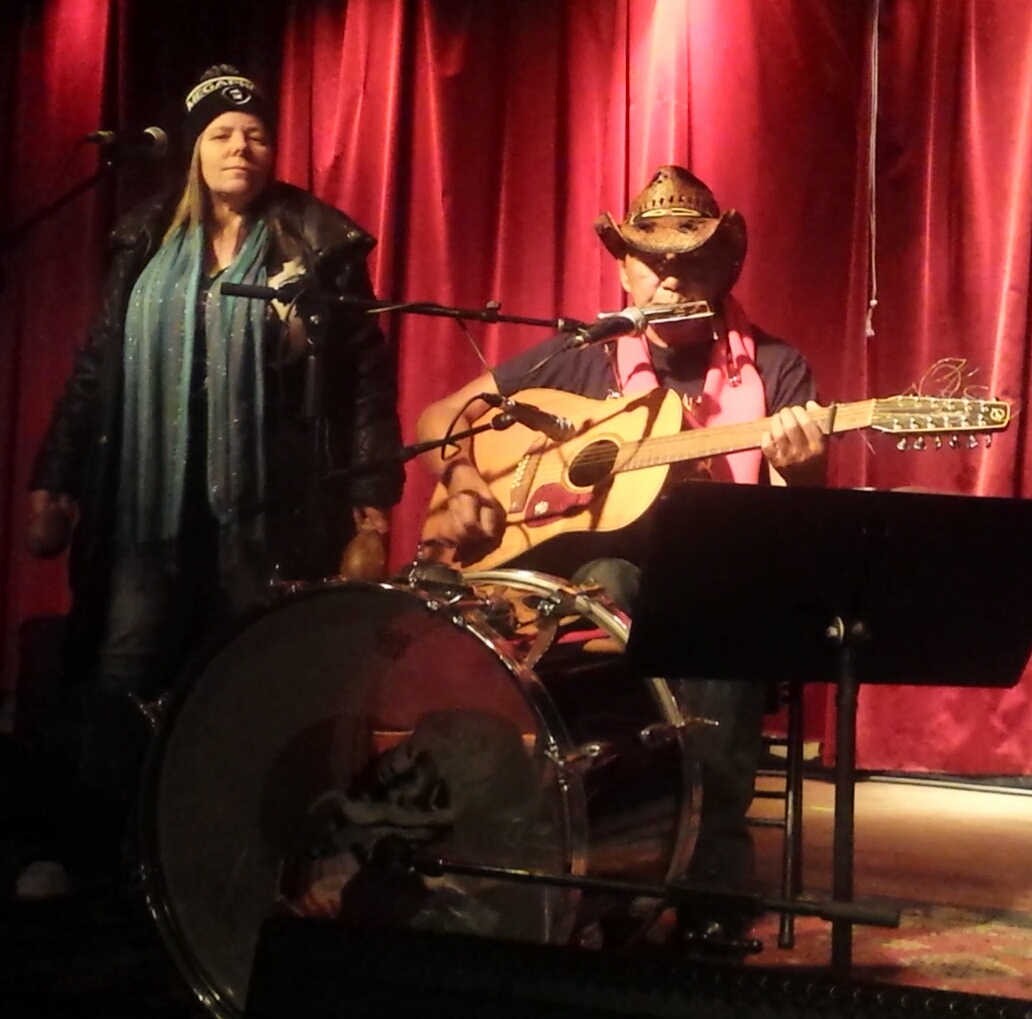
- Thrasher performing at La Sala Rossa in Montreal, Quebec, Canada
- Born: 1948 (age 77–78); Aklavik, Northwest Territories, Canada
- Occupation: Musician
- Years active: 1960s–present
- Relatives: Eric Schweig (nephew)

Willie Thrasher (born 1948) is a Canadian Inuvialuk musician from Aklavik, Northwest Territories. He has recorded both as a solo artist, and as a member of several bands, including The Cordells, and Red Cedar, with Morley Loon. Thrasher has advocated for Inuit and First Nations issues for much of his career.

== Early life ==
Thrasher was born in 1948, in Aklavik. He was born into the traditional Inuit hunting culture of the western Arctic; his father was a whaler and hunter. At age five, he was removed from his family and placed in the Canadian government's residential school system. In Aklavik, he attended the Immaculate Conception and Grollier Hall Residential Schools until he was sixteen., where he learned to play drums on a kit in the gym. After leaving school, he worked as a forest firefighter in Whitehorse, and began playing in rock groups. A fan of Beatles drummer Ringo Starr, Thrasher formed a band called the Cordells with his brother and friends.

== Music career ==
The Cordells toured northern Canada in the late 1960s and early 1970s, playing schools and community halls. Based out of Inuvik, they were considered the town's first rock and roll band, and played mostly contemporary songs and covers. After a show in the mid-1970s, Thrasher was approached by an elderly man and challenged as to why he didn't play music that reflected his Inuit heritage. From that point, Thrasher moved into more personal songwriting and began studying Inuit music.

After this change in style, Thrasher joined popular artists such as Buffy Sainte-Marie and Willie Dunn (Mi'kmaq descent) in exploring Indigenous topics in the mid-1970s, and speaking out on political issues. Thrasher toured heavily in this period, and suffered from alcoholism. In the early 1980s, Thrasher made two recordings with the Canadian Broadcasting Corporation's Northern Service: Spirit Child, a full-length studio album of original songs, and Sweet Grass, a live recording in Val-d'Or, Quebec, with fellow First Nations musicians Willy Mitchell, Morley Loon, and Roger House.

Thrasher joined Morley Loon as part of his Vancouver-based Red Cedar group in the 1980s. In 1990, Thrasher participated in the Odeyak expedition, where Cree and Inuit leaders paddled from Quebec to New York City. A song composed by Thrasher was performed in Times Square by the group. In 1998, Thrasher performed as part of a revival of traditional potlach ceremonies organised by Commissioner of the Yukon Judy Gingell in Whitehorse.

His songs "Spirit Child", "Old Man Carver" and "We Got to Take You Higher" are featured on the 2014 compilation album Native North America, Vol. 1. As a result of the revived publicity from the Native North America compilation, Thrasher has undertaken more extensive touring, including festival dates in Austin, Texas and the Northwest Territories, and his 1981 album Spirit Child was reissued in October 2015 on Light in the Attic Records. Thrasher currently lives on Vancouver Island, in British Columbia.

== Personal life ==
Actor Eric Schweig is Thrasher's nephew.

== Discography ==
- Sweet Grass Music (live), 1980, Canadian Broadcasting Corporation, Northern Service, with Willy Mitchell, Morley Loon, and Roger House
- Spirit Child, 1981, Canadian Broadcasting Corporation, Northern Service
- Asumatak – The Great Land, 2009
