= 2026 Ontario municipal elections =

Canadian local elections

- October 26, 2026
- Turnout: (36.0% ▲3.1pp)

Municipal elections in Ontario were held on October 26, 2026. Voters in the Canadian province of Ontario elected mayors, councillors, school board trustees and all other elected officials in all of the province's municipalities. This was the first set of municipal elections to not overlap with a provincial election in the same year since 2010.

In 2026, the provincial government passed the Better Regional Governance Act, which caused a number of changes to municipal councils in the province. Among them included reducing the size of the Niagara Regional Council from 32 to 13 seats, the size of Simcoe County Council from 32 to 17 members, and gave the provincial government the right to appoint chairs of Durham, Halton, Muskoka, Peel, Waterloo, and York Regions, as well as the Warden of Simcoe County. The reaction to the provincial government’s changes has been mixed.

== By municipality ==
=== Counties ===
- 2026 Bruce County municipal elections
- 2026 Dufferin County municipal elections
- 2026 Elgin County municipal elections
- 2026 Essex County municipal elections
- 2026 Frontenac County municipal elections
- 2026 Grey County municipal elections
- 2026 Haliburton County municipal elections
- 2026 Hastings County municipal elections
- 2026 Huron County municipal elections
- 2026 Lambton County municipal elections
- 2026 Lanark County municipal elections
- 2026 Leeds and Grenville United Counties municipal elections
- 2026 Lennox and Addington County municipal elections
- 2026 Middlesex County municipal elections
- 2026 Northumberland County municipal elections
- 2026 Perth County municipal elections
- 2026 Peterborough County municipal elections
- 2026 Prescott and Russell United Counties municipal elections
- 2026 Renfrew County municipal elections
- 2026 Simcoe County municipal elections
- 2026 Stormont, Dundas and Glengarry United Counties municipal elections
- 2026 Wellington County municipal elections

=== Districts ===
- 2026 Algoma District municipal elections
- 2026 Cochrane District municipal elections
- 2026 Kenora District municipal elections
- 2026 Manitoulin District municipal elections
- 2026 Nipissing District municipal elections
- 2026 Parry Sound District municipal elections
- 2026 Rainy River District municipal elections
- 2026 Sudbury District municipal elections
- 2026 Thunder Bay District municipal elections
- 2026 Timiskaming District municipal elections

=== Regional municipalities ===
- 2026 Durham Region municipal elections
- 2026 Halton Region municipal elections
- 2026 Muskoka District municipal elections
- 2026 Niagara Region municipal elections
- 2026 Oxford County municipal elections
- 2026 Peel Region municipal elections (Brampton, Mississauga)
- 2026 Waterloo Region municipal elections
- 2026 York Region municipal elections

=== Single-tier municipalities ===
Summary of results:

Municipality	Election details	Incumbent mayor	Elected mayor	Turnout %
Barrie	Details	Alex Nuttall	Alex Nuttall	30.21
Belleville	Details	Neil Ellis	Paul Fleming	35.76
Brant, County of	Details	David Bailey	Jennifer Kyle	35.22
Brantford	Details	Kevin Davis	Richard Carpenter	32.62
Brockville	Details	Matt Wren	Cameron Wales	36.78
Chatham-Kent	Details	Darrin Canniff	Micheal Bondy	40.79
Cornwall	Details	Justin Towndale	Sarah Good	34.16
Gananoque	Details	John Beddows	Colin Brown	-
Greater Sudbury	Details	Paul Lefebvre	Paul Lefebvre	40.50
Guelph	Details	Cam Guthrie	Leanne Caron	36.92
Haldimand County	Details	Shelley Ann Bentley	Jake Vandendool	36.31
Hamilton	Details	Andrea Horwath	Keanin Loomis	31.59
Kawartha Lakes	Details	Doug Elmslie	Charles McDonald	34.18
Kingston	Details	Bryan Paterson	Conny Glenn	33.35
London	Details	Josh Morgan	Josh Morgan	31.01
Norfolk County	Details	Amy Martin	Adam Veri	33.01
Orillia	Details	Don McIsaac	Steve Clarke	29.11
Ottawa	Details	Mark Sutcliffe	Mark Sutcliffe	36.21
Pelee	Details	Cathy Miller	David DeLellis	64.74
Pembroke	Details	Ron Gervais	Stephanie LeMay	37.04
Peterborough	Details	Jeff Leal	Michael Eamon	40.27
Prescott	Details	Gauri Shankar	Gauri Shankar	46.59
Prince Edward County	Details	Steve Ferguson	Ernest Margetson	50.07
Quinte West	Details	Jim Harrison	Zack Card	31.88
Smiths Falls	Details	Shawn Pankow	Christopher G. Cummings	38.07
St. Marys	Details	Al Strathdee	Brogan Aylward	45.20
Stratford	Details	Martin Ritsma	Robert Ritz	47.45
St. Thomas	Details	Joe Preston	Jeff Kohler	29.91
Toronto	City Council; Mayor	Olivia Chow	Olivia Chow	45.84
Windsor	Details	Drew Dilkens	Fred Francis	31.84
