= 2026 Middlesex County municipal elections =

Elections in Ontario, Canada

Elections will be held in Middlesex County, Ontario on October 26, 2026, in conjunction with municipal elections across the province.

== Middlesex County Council ==
Middlesex County Council consists of the mayors of each municipality (except Newbury, as a county by law states municipalities with fewer than 1,500 have no representation on council) plus the deputy mayors of the municipalities with over 5,000 electors.

Position	Elected
Adelaide Metcalfe Mayor	Sue Clarke (acclaimed)
Lucan Biddulph Mayor	David Manders
Middlesex Centre Mayor	John Brennan
Middlesex Centre Deputy Mayor	Sue Cates (acclaimed)
North Middlesex Mayor	Brian Ropp (acclaimed)
North Middlesex Deputy Mayor	John Keogh
Southwest Middlesex Mayor	Michael Sholdice
Southwest Middlesex Deputy Mayor	Mark McGill (acclaimed)
Strathroy Caradoc Mayor	Colin Grantham
Strathroy Caradoc Deputy Mayor	Mike McGuire
Thames Centre Mayor	Michelle Smibert
Thames Centre Deputy Mayor	Ed Lee

== Adelaide Metcalfe ==
=== Mayor ===
List of candidates:

Mayoral Candidate	Vote	%
Susan Clarke (X)	Acclaimed	

== Lucan Biddulph ==
=== Mayor ===
Mayor Cathy Burghardt-Jesson is not running for re-election. Running to replace her are deputy mayor David Manders and former mayor Paul Hodgins.

List of candidates:

Mayoral Candidate	Vote	%
David Manders	1,172	51%
Paul Hodgins	1,142	49%

== Middlesex Centre ==
List of candidates:

=== Mayor ===
Mayoral Candidate	Vote	%
John Brennan	3,827	64%
Sean Hunt	2,188	36%

=== Deputy mayor ===
Deputy mayoral candidate	Vote	%
Sue Cates	Acclaimed	

== Newbury ==
=== Mayor ===
Mayoral Candidate	Vote	%
Diane Brewer (X)	Acclaimed	

== North Middlesex ==
List of candidates:

=== Mayor ===
Mayoral Candidate	Vote	%
Brian Ropp (X)	Acclaimed	

=== Deputy mayor ===
Deputy mayoral candidate	Vote	%
John Keogh	1,280	
John Mombourquette	665	

== Southwest Middlesex ==
List of candidates:

=== Mayor ===
Mayoral Candidate	Vote	%
Michael Sholdice	1,589	73%
Martin Welch Jr.	596	27%

=== Deputy mayor ===
Deputy mayoral candidate	Vote	%
Mark McGill	Acclaimed	

== Strathroy-Caradoc ==
List of candidates:

=== Mayor ===
Mayoral Candidate	Vote	%
Colin Grantham (X)	5,185	67%
Bo Derbyshire	2,593	33%

=== Deputy mayor ===
Deputy mayoral candidate	Vote	%
Mike McGuire (X)	3,797	
Mark Eyre	2,839	
Bradley Bock	797	

== Thames Centre ==
List of candidates:

=== Mayor ===
Mayoral Candidate	Vote	%
Michelle Smibert	3,326	67%
Tim Stanlick	1,054	21%
Greg Smith	553	11%

=== Deputy mayor ===
Deputy mayoral candidate	Vote	%
Ed Lee	1,995	
Paul Holbrough	1,437	
Cindy Williams	1,348	
