= John Angaiak =

Alaskan singer-songwriter

John Angaiak (December 7 1941–) is a Yup'ik author, painter, and singer-songwriter born in Nightmute, Alaska.

After returning home from the Vietnam War, Angaiak enrolled in the University of Alaska Fairbanks. He became part of the Eskimo Language Workshop, where he worked to preserve his native language. While there, he worked with Irene Reed to produce some work in Yup'ik. In addition, he produced his first album, I'm Lost in the City. Half of this album was sung in Yup'ik; it was a success in his native Alaska, but was otherwise obscure until it was reissued by Light in the Attic Records sub-label Future Days in 2016. Some tracks appeared on Native North America, Vol. 1.
