= Nightmute, Alaska =

Nightmute Negtemiut / Negta
- City
- Location in Alaska
- Coordinates: 60°29′29″N 164°49′34″W
- Country: United States
- State: Alaska
- Census Area: Bethel
- Incorporated: April 30, 1974

Government
  - Mayor: Clement George
  - State senator: Lyman Hoffman (D)
  - State rep.: Conrad McCormick (D)

Area
  - Total: 104.39 sq mi (270.38 km^{2})
  - Land: 98.96 sq mi (256.30 km^{2})
  - Water: 5.44 sq mi (14.08 km^{2})
- Elevation: 75 ft (23 m)

Population (2020)
  - Total: 306
  - Density: 3.1/sq mi (1.19/km^{2})
- Time zone: UTC-9 (Alaska (AKST))
  - Summer (DST): UTC-8 (AKDT)
- ZIP code: 99690
- Area code: 907
- FIPS code: 02-53930
- GNIS feature ID: 1407008, 2419433

Nightmute (Central Yupik: Negtemiut or Negta) is a city and village in Bethel Census Area, Alaska, United States. The population was 208 at the 2000 census, 280 as of the 2010 census and 306 as of the 2020 census.

== History ==
Negtemiut literally means ‘the people of the pressed-down place’. The first element is negte- ‘to press down on’. The suffix is -miut ‘people’.

It first appeared on the 1940 U.S. Census as the unincorporated Native village of "Nigtmuit". In 1950 and 1960, it was spelled "Nigtmute". In 1970, the spelling used was "Nightmute". It formally incorporated in 1974.

In 1964, many of its residents relocated by dogsled and founded the bayside community of Toksook Bay about 15 miles (24 km) downriver. The relocation was to avoid the yearly spring-winter migration to and from Umkumiut and Nightmute.

== Geography ==
Nightmute is located on Nelson Island near Toksook Bay. The two villages connect by snowmachine trail in winter.

According to the United States Census Bureau, the city has a total area of 101.5 square miles (263 km^{2}), of which 97.0 square miles (251 km^{2}) is land and 4.6 square miles (12 km^{2}) (4.50%) is water. Nightmute lies 15 to 17 miles east of the neighboring village of Toksook Bay.

== Culture ==
Traditionally, Yup'ik babies were swaddled in atasuaq, bird-skin parkas before the 1920s; in 1918, with the passage of the Migratory Bird Treaty Act (MBTA), this practice as well as Native communities' abilities to feed and clothe themselves, was legally outlawed. In 1997, after prolonged advocacy by Native people, the U.S. government amended the MBTA to allow for Indigenous communities to resume their hunts. While atasuaq were now allowed to be openly created, increased availability of commercial diapers and western clothes also worked against going back to traditional ways.

John Agaiak, a Yup'ik artist born in Nightmute in the 1940s, released I'm Lost in the City, an album in 1971 sung in both Yup'ik and English.

== Demographics ==
Historical population
| Census | Pop. | Note | %± |
|---|---|---|---|
| 1940 | 78 | | — |
| 1950 | 27 | | −65.4% |
| 1960 | 237 | | 777.8% |
| 1970 | 127 | | −46.4% |
| 1980 | 119 | | −6.3% |
| 1990 | 153 | | 28.6% |
| 2000 | 208 | | 35.9% |
| 2010 | 280 | | 34.6% |
| 2020 | 306 | | 9.3% |
U.S. Decennial Census

=== 2020 census ===
As of the 2020 census, Nightmute had a population of 306. The median age was 21.6 years. 44.4% of residents were under the age of 18 and 7.8% of residents were 65 years of age or older. For every 100 females there were 105.4 males, and for every 100 females age 18 and over there were 120.8 males age 18 and over.

0.0% of residents lived in urban areas, while 100.0% lived in rural areas.

There were 63 households in Nightmute, of which 61.9% had children under the age of 18 living in them. Of all households, 49.2% were married-couple households, 27.0% were households with a male householder and no spouse or partner present, and 14.3% were households with a female householder and no spouse or partner present. About 17.5% of all households were made up of individuals and 3.2% had someone living alone who was 65 years of age or older.

There were 63 housing units, of which 0.0% were vacant. The homeowner vacancy rate was 0.0% and the rental vacancy rate was 0.0%.

Racial composition as of the 2020 census
| Race | Number | Percent |
|---|---|---|
| White | 8 | 2.6% |
| Black or African American | 0 | 0.0% |
| American Indian and Alaska Native | 294 | 96.1% |
| Asian | 0 | 0.0% |
| Native Hawaiian and Other Pacific Islander | 0 | 0.0% |
| Some other race | 0 | 0.0% |
| Two or more races | 4 | 1.3% |
| Hispanic or Latino (of any race) | 0 | 0.0% |

=== 2000 census ===
As of the census of 2000, there were 208 people, 47 households, and 38 families residing in the city. The population density was 2.1 inhabitants per square mile (0.81/km^{2}). There were 54 housing units at an average density of 0.6 per square mile (0.23/km^{2}). The racial makeup of the city was 91.83% Native American, 5.29% White and 2.88% from two or more races. 0.96% of the population were Hispanic or Latino of any race.

There were 47 households, out of which 61.7% had children under the age of 18 living with them, 53.2% were married couples living together, 17.0% had a female householder with no husband present, and 19.1% were non-families. 10.6% of all households were made up of individuals, and none had someone living alone who was 65 years of age or older. The average household size was 4.43 and the average family size was 5.03.

In the city, the age distribution of the population shows 41.3% under the age of 18, 13.5% from 18 to 24, 28.4% from 25 to 44, 12.0% from 45 to 64, and 4.8% who were 65 years of age or older. The median age was 22 years. For every 100 females, there were 108.0 males. For every 100 females age 18 and over, there were 106.9 males.

The median income for a household in the city was $35,938, and the median income for a family was $36,250. Males had a median income of $21,250 versus $23,125 for females. The per capita income for the city was $9,396. About 7.1% of families and 10.7% of the population were below the poverty line, including 12.6% of those under the age of eighteen and none of those 65 or over.

=== Indigenous culture ===
Many of the Indigenous people within Nightmute share ancestry and culture with Indigenous people in the neighboring areas of Tununak, Chefornak, Toksook Bay, and Newtok; collectively, they call themselves Qaluyaarmiut, which translates to dip net people.

== Education ==
The school is Negtemiut Elitnaurviat School, a.k.a. Nightmute School, operated by the Lower Kuskokwim School District.

== Health ==
Sale, importation and possession of alcohol are banned in the village.

== Popular culture ==
Nightmute is the setting of the 2002 Christopher Nolan film Insomnia, starring Hilary Swank, Al Pacino, and Robin Williams. The film was not shot in the real Nightmute, but Squamish, British Columbia.

== See also ==
- Nightmute Airport
