= 2026 Oxford County municipal elections =

Elections will be held in Oxford County, Ontario on October 26, 2026, in conjunction with municipal elections across the province. Each municipality will elect a mayor and a local council, plus two city and county councillors from Woodstock. Trustees to the Thames Valley District School Board, London District Catholic School Board, and Conseil scolaire catholique Providence will also be elected.

== Oxford County Council ==
Oxford County Council consists of the mayors of each of the county's eight municipalities, plus two additional councillors from Woodstock.

Position	Elected
Blandford-Blenheim Mayor	
East Zorra-Tavistock Mayor	
Ingersoll Mayor	
Norwich Mayor	
South-West Oxford Mayor	Craig Gillis (acclaimed)
Tilsonburg Mayor	
Woodstock Mayor	
Woodstock Deputy Mayor	
Woodstock Councillor	
Zorra Mayor	

== Blandford-Blenheim ==
=== Mayor ===
Mayor Mark Peterson is running for re-election. He is being challenged by mortgage agent Clay Haight.

List of candidates:

Mayoral Candidate	Vote	%
Mark Peterson (X)		
Clayton Haight		

== East Zorra-Tavistock ==
=== Mayor ===
Mayor Phil Schaefer is running for re-election. He is being challenged by former deputy mayor Don Edmiston.

List of candidates:

Mayoral Candidate	Vote	%
Philip Schaefer (X)		
Don Edmiston		

== Ingersoll ==
=== Mayor ===
List of candidates:

Mayoral Candidate	Vote	%
Brian Petrie (X)		
Tim Lobzun		

== Norwich ==
=== Mayor ===
Mayor Jim Palmer is running for re-election. Running against him is Ward 4 councillor Adrian Couwenberg.

List of candidates:

Mayoral Candidate	Vote	%
Adrian Couwenberg	2,732	
Jim Palmer (X)	1,114	

== South-West Oxford ==
=== Mayor ===
Ward 4 councillor Craig Gillis has been elected mayor by acclamation.

List of candidates:

Mayoral Candidate	Vote	%
Craig Gillis	Acclaimed	

== Tillsonburg ==
=== Mayor ===
Mayor Deb Gilvesy announced she was running for re-election. She will be challenged by town councillor Kelly Spencer.

List of candidates:

Mayoral Candidate	Vote	%
Deb Gilvesy (X)	4,475	
Kelly Spencer	2,052	

== Woodstock ==
List of candidates:

Woodstock City Council consists of the mayor, deputy mayor, county councillor and four city councillors. The mayor, deputy mayor, and county councillor also sit on Oxford County Council.

=== Mayor ===
Mayor Jerry Acchione ran for re-election. He was opposed by businessman Anthony Scalisi.

Mayoral Candidate	Vote	%
Jerry Acchione (X)	6,458	49.16
Anthony Scalisi	5,483	41.74
Aaron Gorlick	914	6.96
Asjad Hussain	282	2.15

=== Deputy Mayor ===
Candidate	Vote	%
Deb Tait	6,469	49.77
Bernia Martin	3,705	28.50
Jarrod Erb	2,825	21.73

=== County Councillor ===
Candidate	Vote	%
Kelly Gilson	7,371	57.72
Mark Schadenberg	5,400	42.28

=== City Councillor ===
4 to be elected

Candidate	Vote	%
Kate Leatherbarrow (X)	6,512	15.54
Joe Brown	5,787	13.81
Connie Lauder (X)	5,547	13.24
Wes Mazur	5,486	13.09
Maureen Ralph	5,122	12.22
Daniel Leduc	3,618	8.63
Dave Bloxsidge	3,508	8.37
Kurt Sutherland	3,203	7.64
Sandeep Sidhu	3,117	7.44

== Zorra ==
=== Mayor ===
Mayor Marcus Ryan is not running for re-election. Running for mayor is crossing guard Lori McDonald, Ward 2 councillor Katie Grigg, and Ward 4 councillor Crystal Finch.

List of candidates:

Mayoral Candidate	Vote	%
Lori McDonald		
Katie Grigg		
Crystal Finch		
