= Duke Redbird =

Canadian poet, journalist, activist, actor

- Born: 1939 (age 86–87); Saugeen First Nation, Ontario
- Occupations: poet, journalist, academic, actor
- Years active: 1960s-present
- Notable work: I Am Canadian, Loveshine and Red Wine, We Are Métis
- Children: Jay Bell Redbird

Duke Redbird OC (born 1939) is an Indigenous Canadian poet, journalist, activist, businessman, actor and administrator, best known as a key figure in the development of First Nations literature in Canada.

An Ojibwe from the Saugeen First Nation in Southwestern Ontario, he became a ward of the Children's Aid Society at nine months of age after his mother died in a house fire. Raised predominantly by white foster families, he began writing as a way to deal with the anti-indigenous racism he faced in schools.

== Early career ==
During the mid-1960s, he started his career as a spoken word artist on folk festival, coffeehouse and theatre tours across Canada, he then became editor of a native newspaper named The Thunderbird, and was a determined organizer of protests and spoke on native rights issues.

In this era, he was also the neighbour of Joni Mitchell during her early career on Toronto's Yorkville coffeehouse scene, and had his first acting role in an episode of Adventures in Rainbow Country.

Marty Dunn published a biography of Redbird, Red on White, in 1971.

Redbird's spoken word performances were caught on film in the NFB documentary The Other Side of the Ledger.

== Writing ==
His collections of published poetry include I Am Canadian (1978) and Loveshine and Red Wine (1981). He has also done other commissioned work for various public events in Canada, including the official opening of the Canadian Museum of Civilization and Expo 67. A project of musical theatre primarily based on his poetry was performed for Queen Elizabeth II and Prince Philip, Duke of Edinburgh during the Silver Jubilee of Elizabeth II in 1977, and Redbird represented Canada at the Valmiki World Poetry Festival in Delhi, India in 1985.

He collaborated with musician Winston Wuttunee in the 1970s, including a joint appearance at the Mariposa Folk Festival and the album See the Arrow.

From his spoken word work, two CD's Duke Redbird the Poet (1994) and In Other Words (1999) have been released. In 1999, indigenous rapper TKO persuaded Redbird to work together on his next album, asserting that "Duke Redbird is the old master of the spoken word and I'm the new master."

"Silver River", a song Redbird recorded in 1975 in collaboration with musician Shingoose, appears on the 2014 compilation album Native North America, Vol. 1. The song originally appeared on Shingoose's four-song EP Native Country.

With Bonnie Devine and Robert Houle, he also cowrote The Drawings and Paintings of Daphne Odjig: A Retrospective Exhibition, the guidebook to the National Gallery of Art's 2009 retrospective exhibition of artist Daphne Odjig.

== Activism ==
During the 1970s, Redbird was vice-president of the Native Council of Canada. After earning a master's degree in political science from York University, his academic thesis We Are Metis was published in 1980. He subsequently served as president of the Ontario Métis and Non-Status Indian Association.

== Media work ==
He began working in television and film during the 1990s. He wrote the teleplay Four Directions: A Canoe for the Making for CBC Television, was an associate producer on the feature film Dance Me Outside, and produced a multimedia documentary on indigenous art for the National Film Board. He has also worked in television as a news producer and First Nations issues reporter for Citytv.

He took on multiple acting roles in this era, appearing in episodes of Wonderfalls and Relic Hunter, and in the films Elimination Dance, The Shaman's Source and Casino Jack.

== Business ==
In the 1990s he was co-owner of a downtown Toronto pub, the Coloured Stone, and played a pivotal role in reuniting Mitchell with Kilauren Gibb, the daughter she had given up for adoption in the 1960s. He also launched Native Blend Coffee, a line of fair trade coffee, in 1999. In 2000, he opened a restaurant, Eureka Continuum, to specialize in indigenous cuisine.

In this era, he described to the Toronto Star the ways in which his philosophy of activism had shifted: "I'm still a kind of activist, but it's on a different level. Now, I'm an elder, a wisdom-keeper, a sharer. I try to help people from community - aboriginal, indigenous people who may be Metis, First Nations or Inuit - who are assembling strategies to accomplish their goals. Wisdom is choosing the right goal. It's my job to ask: Is it wise?"

== Academic work ==
After leaving Citytv in 2009, Redbird joined OCAD University as a mentor and advisor in the institution's indigenous visual culture program until 2012. He was awarded an honorary doctorate from the institution in 2013.

In 2019, he collaborated with Myseum of Toronto on an indigenous history project at Ontario Place.
