= Gil Cardinal =

Canadian filmmaker

- Born: Gilbert Joseph Cardinal; July 19, 1950; Edmonton, Alberta, Canada
- Died: November 21, 2015 (aged 65); Edmonton, Alberta, Canada
- Education: Northern Alberta Institute of Technology
- Occupation: Filmmaker
- Years active: 1970s–2015

Gilbert Joseph "Gil" Cardinal (July 19, 1950 – November 21, 2015) was a Canadian filmmaker of Métis descent. Born in Edmonton in 1950, and placed in a foster home at the age of two, Cardinal only discovered his Métis roots while making his documentary Foster Child. This 1987 National Film Board of Canada (NFB) film received over 10 international film awards, including a Gemini Award for best direction for a documentary program, following its broadcast on CBC's Man Alive series.

== Background ==
After graduating from the radio and TV arts program of the Northern Alberta Institute of Technology in 1971, he worked as a studio cameraman at Alberta's Access network, where he made his first film, a documentary about the pianist Mark Jablonski. In 1975 he became director and associate producer of the series Come Alive. He also Shadow Puppets: Indian Myths and Legends, a series on Cree and Blackfoot legends.

Cardinal left Access in 1980 to work with the NFB as a freelance director, researcher, writer and editor. His first film he directed for the Film Board was Children of Alcohol (1983), produced by Anne Wheeler, a documentary about the effects of parental alcoholism on children. He also shot a series of short documentaries and dramas, notably Hotwalker (1985), before making Foster Child. In 1987, Cardinal made Keyanaw Tatuskhatamak, about the struggle for Native self-government in northern Alberta. Other NFB credits include The Spirit Within (1990), on Native spiritual programs in prisons, and David with F.A.S. (1997), about fetal alcohol syndrome.

In 1998, he directed the CBC miniseries Big Bear, for which Cardinal was nominated for a second Gemini. In 2006, he made the CBC drama Indian Summer: The Oka Crisis, about the 1990 Oka Crisis. Cardinal also directed numerous episodes of North of 60 and The Rez, and an episode of the drama anthology series Four Directions.

He directed two NFB documentaries about the ultimately successful efforts of the Haisla Nation to repatriate their g'psgolox pole, a mortuary pole taken from them in 1929. His 2003 film Totem: The Return of the G’psgolox Pole, premiered at the Toronto International Film Festival.

== Death and legacy ==
In 1997, Cardinal was recognized with a National Aboriginal Achievement Award, now the Indspire Awards, for Film and Television. On November 7, 2015, the Alberta Media Production Industries Association (AMPIA) announced at its 27th David Billington Award ceremony that he was the recipient of the 2015 award, which honours contributions to the province's audiovisual industry. Too ill to attend, Cardinal had been presented with the award at a private ceremony. AMPIA also announced the creation of the Gil Cardinal Legacy Fund, which was founded by close friends, to provide funding for emerging Aboriginal filmmakers to kickstart their careers. Cardinal died of cirrhosis on November 21, 2015, in Edmonton at the age of 65. He had been hospitalized in his final months as he experienced a serious health decline complicated by diabetes.
