= 2026 Ontario municipal elections in Northern Ontario =

Canadian elections

Municipal elections will be held in the Canadian province of Ontario on October 26, 2026.

This is an outline of the electoral races in the northern part of the province, organized by district. There will also be elections in Greater Sudbury, which is not part of any district.

== Cochrane ==
=== Black River-Matheson ===
==== Mayor ====
Mayor Dave Dyment was re-elected by acclamation in Black River-Matheson:

Mayoral Candidate	Vote	%
Dave Dyment (X)	Acclaimed	

=== Cochrane ===
==== Mayor ====
Mayor Peter Politis is not running for re-election. Running to replace him are councillors Sylvie Charron-Lemieux and Susan Nelson.

List of candidates in Cochrane.

Mayoral Candidate	Vote	%
Sylvie Charron-Lemieux		
Susan Nelson		

=== Hearst ===
==== Mayor ====
Mayor Roger Sigouin is running for re-election. He is being challenged by former mayor Jean Marie Blier and former councillor Gaetan Baillargeon.

List of candidates in Hearst:

Mayoral Candidate	Vote	%
Roger Sigouin (X)		
Gaëtan Baillargeon		
Jean-Marie Blier		

=== Fauquier-Strickland ===
No one filed for mayor or for council in Fauquier-Strickland at the time of the August 21 deadline for nominations. As a result, the deadline was extended to August 26, in which one candidate came forward to run for mayor.

==== Mayor ====
Mayoral Candidate	Vote	%
Pierre Lamontagne	Acclaimed	

=== Iroquois Falls ===
==== Mayor ====
Mayor Troy Delaurier is being challenged by retired municipal CAO Michelle Larose.

List of candidates in Iroquois Falls:

Mayoral Candidate	Vote	%
Tory Delaurier (X)		
Michelle Larose		

=== Kapuskasing ===
Mayor David Plourde has been re-elected by acclamation in Kapuskasing:

==== Mayor ====
Mayoral Candidate	Vote	%
David Plourde (X)	Acclaimed	

=== Mattice-Val Côté ===
==== Mayor ====
List of candidates in Mattice-Val Côté:

Mayoral Candidate	Vote	%
Marc Dupuis (X)		
Fernando Thibodeau		

=== Moonbeam ===
==== Mayor ====
Mayor Luc Léonard has been elected in Moonbeam by acclamation.

Mayoral Candidate	Vote	%
Luc Léonard (X)	Acclaimed	

=== Moosonee ===
==== Mayor ====
List of candidates in Moosonee:

Mayoral Candidate	Vote	%
Wayne Taipale (X)		
Randy Cota		
Jenn Tozer		
Marie Burke-Lecours		
Jerome Saunders Sr.		
Diane Ryder		

=== Opasatika ===
==== Mayor ====
List of candidates in Opasatika:

Mayoral Candidate	Vote	%
Jacques Dorval (X)		
Ron Craig		

=== Smooth Rock Falls ===
==== Mayor ====
List of candidates in Smooth Rock Falls:

Mayoral Candidate	Vote	%
Patrick Roberts (X)		
Gratien Bernier		

=== Timmins ===
The following are the list of candidate for mayor and city council of Timmins.

==== Mayor ====
Mayor Michelle Boileau ran for re-election. Opposing her were retired police officer and businessman Rob Knox, former Mushkegowuk Council grand chief, Juno Award winning musician and former mayor of Cochrane and Sioux Lookout Lawrence Martin, electrician Chris McNeil, exotic pet store owner Robert Bocuher, and realtor Nathan Boulet.

Mayoral Candidate	Vote	%
Rob Knox	9,980	54.92
Michelle Boileau (X)	3,016	16.60
Robert Boucher	2,803	15.42
Lawrence Martin	1,906	10.49
Nathan Boulet	357	1.96
Chris McNeil	110	0.61

==== Timmins City Council ====
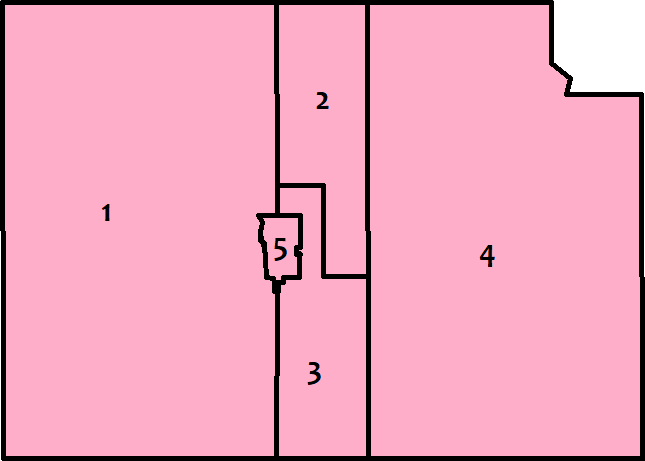
Map of Timmins' five wards

Candidate	Vote	%
Ward 1
Steve Black (X)	1,465	40.12
Jordan Haylor	917	25.11
Kraymr Grenke	869	23.80
Corey Lepage	401	10.98
Ward 2
Mark Rogers	557	41.02
John Patrick Curley (X)	479	35.27
Walter Wawrzaszek	241	17.75
Marcus Niebler	81	5.96
Ward 3
Bill Gvozdanovic (X)	647	62.63
Carter Lucyk	181	17.52
Dave Farrell	124	12.00
Christina Kioke	81	7.84
Ward 4
Steve Meunier	1,232	62.60
Ken Steinbrunner	383	19.46
Brian Beauchamp	261	13.26
Alain Lefebvre	92	4.67
Ward 5 4 to be elected
Melanie Verreault	4,869	16.61
Ken Joanisse	3,235	11.04
Marc Lauzier	3,202	10.93
Sharon Rivard	2,890	9.86
Lorne Feldman (X)	2,520	8.60
Julie Norbert-Demarchi	2,116	7.22
Jason Boissonneault	2,022	6.90
Veronica Farrell	1,510	5.15
Robert Crocco	1,508	5.15
David MacInnes	1,502	5.13
Cory Robin (X)	1,341	4.58
Cam McEachern	894	3.05
Petersen Spence	767	2.62
Mael Girard	519	1.77
Kallen Potvin	412	1.41

==== Ballot question ====
In addition to voting for mayor and council, Timmins voters will be asked the following ballot question: Do you support changing the Ward System for electing members of Council?

Choice	Vote	%
Yes	9,449	54.56
No	7,870	45.44

=== Val Rita-Harty ===
==== Mayor ====
Steven Lambert has been elected mayor of Val Rita-Harty by acclamation.

Mayoral Candidate	Vote	%
Steven Lambert	Acclaimed	

== Kenora ==
=== Dryden ===
Mayor Jack Harrison is running for re-election.

List of candidates in Dryden:

Mayoral Candidate	Vote	%
Jack Harrison (X)		
Brenda Sedgwick		
Derek Ouellette		

=== Ear Falls ===
Kevin Kahoot was re-elected by acclamation as mayor of Ear Falls.

Mayoral Candidate	Vote	%
Kevin Kahoot (X)	Acclaimed	

=== Ignace ===
List of candidates in Ignace:

Mayoral Candidate	Vote	%
Jodie Defeo		
Jeff Lederer		

=== Kenora ===
Mayor Andrew Poirier, who has been mayor since 2022 has been re-elected as mayor of Kenora by acclamation.

Mayoral Candidate	Vote	%
Andrew Poirier (X)	Acclaimed	

=== Machin ===
List of candidates in Machin:

Mayoral Candidate	Vote	%
Gord Griffiths (X)		
Bonnie Leutschaft		

=== Pickle Lake ===
List of candidates in Pickle Lake:

Mayoral Candidate	Vote	%
James Dalzell (X)		
Roy Hoffman		

=== Red Lake ===
Mayor Fred Mota is being challenged by councillor Warren Badiuk.

List of candidates in Red Lake:

Mayoral Candidate	Vote	%
Fred Mota (X)		
Warren Badiuk		

=== Sioux Lookout ===
Mayor Doug Lawrance announced in May that he was running for re-election. Challenging him is Alex Legros, who works in security for the Sioux Lookout First Nations Health Authority and retired construction worker Mike Quince.

List of candidates in Sioux Lookout:

Mayoral Candidate	Vote	%
Doug Lawrance (X)		
Alex Legros		
Mike Quince		

=== Sioux Narrows-Nestor Falls ===
Mayor Gale Black was re-elected by acclamation in Sioux Narrows-Nestor Falls.

Mayoral Candidate	Vote	%
Gale Black (X)	Acclaimed	

== Manitoulin ==
=== Assiginack ===
Mayoral Candidate	Vote	%
Brenda Reid (X)		
Dave Ham		
Jennifer Hooper		

=== Billings ===
Mayoral Candidate	Vote	%
Sandi Hurcomb		
Jim Cahill		
Roger Chenard		

=== Burpee and Mills ===
Reeve Candidate	Vote	%
Ken Noland (X)		
Daniel Duval		

=== Central Manitoulin ===
Mayoral Candidate	Vote	%
Richard Stephens (X)		
D. Paul Duxbury		
Adam Smith		
Maja Mielonen		

=== Cockburn Island ===
Mayoral Candidate	Vote	%
Lee Chappell		
Robert Brown		

=== Gordon/Barrie Island ===
Reeve Candidate	Vote	%
Brad Wright	Acclaimed	

=== Gore Bay ===
Mayoral Candidate	Vote	%
Annette Clarke		
Clarke Bitter		
Dan Osborne		

=== Northeastern Manitoulin and the Islands ===
Mayor Al MacNevin is being challenged by former councillor Paul Skippen and director of Mnaamodzawin Health Services Rebecca Milne.

Mayoral Candidate	Vote	%
Alan MacNevin (X)		
Paul Skippen		
Rebecca Milne		

=== Tehkummah ===
Reeve Candidate	Vote	%
John Greenway		
Steven Wood		

== Parry Sound ==
=== The Archipelago ===
Reeve Candidate	Vote	%
Scott Sheard	Acclaimed	

=== Armour ===
Mayoral Candidate	Vote	%
Ron Ward (X)		
Donald Cameron		

=== Burk's Falls ===
Mayoral Candidate	Vote	%
Chris Hope (X)		
Jon Hind		

=== Callander ===
Mayoral Candidate	Vote	%
Jody Carr (X)	Acclaimed	

=== Carling ===
Mayoral Candidate	Vote	%
David Welling		
Bruce Kelly		
Gary Bauer		

=== Joly ===
Mayoral Candidate	Vote	%
Chris Nicholson	Acclaimed	

=== Kearney ===
Mayoral Candidate	Vote	%
Cheryl Philip (X)		
Brittany Filmore		

=== Machar ===
Mayoral Candidate	Vote	%
Lynda Carleton (X)	Acclaimed	

=== Magnetawan ===
Mayoral Candidate	Vote	%
Sam Dunnett (X)		
Gary Coombs		
Ellie Mae Rainey		
Elizabeth White		
Bill Bishop		

=== McDougall ===
Mayoral Candidate	Vote	%
Dale Robinson (X)	Acclaimed	

=== McKellar ===
Reeve Candidate	Vote	%
Julian Cutajar		
Morley Haskim		

=== McMurrich/Monteith ===
Reeve Candidate	Vote	%
Craig White		
Sandra Tonellotto		

=== Nipissing ===
Mayoral Candidate	Vote	%
Dave Yemm (X)		
Stephen Kirkey		

=== Parry Sound ===
Mayoral Candidate	Vote	%
Jamie McGarvey (X)	Acclaimed	

=== Perry ===
Mayoral Candidate	Vote	%
Jared Matthew Beverly		
Joe Lumley		

=== Powassan ===
Mayor Peter McIsaac is not running for re-election. He served as mayor for 16 years.

Mayoral Candidate	Vote	%
Alex Saikaley		
Rebecca Metcalf		

=== Ryerson ===
Mayoral Candidate	Vote	%
Dan Robertson		
Barry Burton		

=== Seguin ===
Mayoral Candidate	Vote	%
Ann MacDiarmid (X)		
Ronald L. Steele		

=== South River ===
Mayoral Candidate	Vote	%
Jim Coleman (X)	Acclaimed	

=== Strong ===
Mayoral Candidate	Vote	%
Jim Gross		
Jim Ronholm		

=== Sundridge ===
Mayoral Candidate	Vote	%
Tim Bryson		
Dan Karas		
Cynthia Diamond		

=== Whitestone ===
Mayoral Candidate	Vote	%
George Comrie (X)		
Brian Woods		
Joe Lamb		

== Rainy River ==
=== Alberton ===
Reeve Candidate	Vote	%
Mike Ford (X)	Acclaimed	

=== Atikokan ===
Mayor Rob Ferguson is being challenged by councillor Liz Shine.

Mayoral Candidate	Vote	%
Rob Ferguson (X)		
Liz Shine		

=== Chapple ===
Reeve Candidate	Vote	%
James Gibson (X)	Acclaimed	

=== Dawson ===
Mayoral Candidate	Vote	%
Douglas Hartnell (X)		
David Haner		

=== Emo ===
Mayoral Candidate	Vote	%
Harold McQuaker (X)	Acclaimed	

=== Fort Frances ===
Councillor John McTaggart is running against Brent Calder, a retired construction and project manager and Métis Nation Council representative.

Mayoral Candidate	Vote	%
John McTaggart		
Brent Calder		

=== Lake of the Woods ===
Mayoral Candidate	Vote	%
Colleen Fadden (X)	Acclaimed	

=== La Vallee ===
Reeve Candidate	Vote	%
Lucille MacDonald (X)		
Jim Belluz		

=== Morley ===
Reeve Candidate	Vote	%
Telford Advent (X)		
Ashley Morrison		

=== Rainy River ===
Mayoral Candidate	Vote	%
Deborah Ewald (X)		
Andrew Hartnell		

== Sudbury ==
=== Baldwin ===
Mayoral Candidate	Vote	%
Vern Gorham (X)		
Texas MacDonald		

=== Chapleau ===
Mayoral Candidate	Vote	%
Ryan Bignucolo (X)		
Alex Lambruschini		
David McDonald		

=== Espanola ===
Mayoral Candidate	Vote	%
Douglas Gervais (X)		
Aidan Kallioinen		

=== French River ===
Mayoral Candidate	Vote	%
Gisèle Pageau (X)		
Christian Hebert		

=== Killarney ===
Mayoral Candidate	Vote	%
Michael Reider (X)	Acclaimed	

=== Markstay-Warren ===
Running for mayor includes councillor Dave Boland.

Mayoral Candidate	Vote	%
Maurice Turcot		
Andrew Somers		
Mark Lavallee		
Dave Boland		

=== Nairn and Hyman ===
Mayoral Candidate	Vote	%
Amy Mazey (X)	Acclaimed	

=== Sables-Spanish Rivers ===
Mayoral Candidate	Vote	%
Brent St. Denis		
Mike Mercieca		

=== St. Charles ===
Mayoral Candidate	Vote	%
Paul Branconnier (X)		
Paul Schoppmann (X)		

== Timiskaming ==
=== Armstrong ===
Mayoral Candidate	Vote	%
Jean Marc Boileau (X)	Acclaimed	

=== Brethour ===
Reeve Candidate	Vote	%
David Wight (X)	Acclaimed	

=== Casey ===
Reeve Candidate	Vote	%
Guy Labonté (X)	Acclaimed	

=== Chamberlain ===
Reeve Candidate	Vote	%
Kerry Stewart (X)	Acclaimed	

=== Charlton and Dack ===
Reeve Candidate	Vote	%
William R. Laurila (X)	Acclaimed	

=== Cobalt ===
Mayoral Candidate	Vote	%
Pat Anderson (X)		
Mike Harrison		

=== Coleman ===
Mayoral Candidate	Vote	%
Michel Cooper		
Lois Perry		

=== Englehart ===
Mayoral Candidate	Vote	%
Jo-Anne Farmer		
Brian Bockus		

=== Evanturel ===
Reeve Candidate	Vote	%
Derek Mundle (X)	Acclaimed	

=== Gauthier ===
Reeve Candidate	Vote	%
Paul Binnendyk (X)		
Kelly Bowers		

=== Harley ===
Reeve Candidate	Vote	%
Sophie MacKewn	Acclaimed	

=== Harris ===
Reeve Candidate	Vote	%
Chantal Despres (X)	Acclaimed	

=== Hilliard ===
Reeve Candidate	Vote	%
Laurie Bolesworth (X)	Acclaimed	

=== Hudson ===
Reeve Candidate	Vote	%
Larry Craig (X)		
David Grant		

=== James ===
Reeve Candidate	Vote	%
Roger Donaldson (X)		
Chris Cormier		

=== Kerns ===
Reeve Candidate	Vote	%
Terry Phillips (X)		
Christine Harrison		

=== Kirkland Lake ===
Mayor Stacy Wight was re-elected by acclamation. She made the announcement in June.

Mayoral Candidate	Vote	%
Stacy Wight (X)	Acclaimed	

=== Larder Lake ===
Mayoral Candidate	Vote	%
Patty Quinn (X)		
Rickey Vachon		

=== Latchford ===
Mayoral Candidate	Vote	%
Sharon Gadoury-East (X)		
Scott Green		

=== Matachewan ===
Reeve Candidate	Vote	%
Michael Young (X)		
Brett Alton		

=== McGarry ===
Mayoral Candidate	Vote	%
Elaine Fic	Acclaimed	

=== Temiskaming Shores ===
Mayoral Candidate	Vote	%
Jeff Laferriere (X)		
Michael Woods		

=== Thornloe ===
Reeve Candidate	Vote	%
Wayne Miller (X)	Acclaimed	
