= Irene Reed =

American anthropologist, linguist and educator

- Born: Elma Irene Reed; February 17, 1931; Automba, Minnesota
- Died: March 5, 2005; Automba, Minnesota
- Education: Masters
- Alma mater: University of Washington; University of Alaska Fairbanks

Irene Reed (Yup'ik: Iitaruaq; February 17, 1931 – March 5, 2005), was an American anthropologist, linguist and educator, central in preserving and promoting the Yup'ik language in Alaska.

== Biography ==
Elma Irene Reed was born to Rev. Matt and Edna Reed on February 17, 1931, and grew up in Automba, Minnesota. She came from a large family with sisters Gladys, LaVerne, Betty Jane, Emily, and Helen and brothers Ernest, Arnold, John, Edwin, Raymond, Emil and William who died as a baby. She was educated in Kalevala Grade School and Barnum High School, finishing in 1949. She was of Finnish descent and had an interest in her Finnish roots. She graduated with a degree in anthropology in 1961 from the University of Washington, Seattle. She went on to earn a master's degree in Anthropology and Linguistics from the University of Alaska Fairbanks (UAF) in 1972.

In Alaska, Reed became involved in the Yup'ik language and its preservation. She wrote the landmark Yup'ik Eskimo Grammar book and compiled the original card file for the Central Yup'ik Lexicon. As a result of this work, the first full dictionary of an Alaskan language was written. Reed was part of the creation of the first bilingual native language program for Alaskan schools and she was instrumental in founding the Eskimo language workshop in Fairbanks. She later moved the workshop to Bethel, where it became the Yup'ik Language Center. Reed wrote several books and arranged for almost 200 titles to be produced in the Yup'ik Language Workshop. She was given the name "Iitaruaq" by the Yup'ik people.

Reed was the Professor of Yup'ik and became the director of UAF's Alaska Native Language Center. Reed also taught Yup'ik language and culture to students at the University of Oregon, in Honolulu, and at Monmouth College in Oregon. Through her work, Reed was a guest of the government during the Decade of the Indigenous People UN celebration. She worked extensively with Marie Meade.

In the summers, Reed taught written language and grammar to locals in Bristol Bay, St Mary's and Bethel. In 2003, Reed donated most of her work to the UAF Alaska Native Language Center archives. Alan Boraas, who taught anthropology at Kenai Peninsula College called it the "most significant scholarship undertaken in Alaska". Reed became a member of the Linguistic Society of America in 1945 and a Life Member seven years later.

Apart from her work with the Alaskan language, Reed, with Niilo Koponen, founded the "Fairbanks Finns" organization. She also helped start "Nordic House" and arranged exchange programs with Scandinavian scholars at the UAF campus especially helping Finnish and Sámi scholars researching in Alaska.

== Later life ==
Reed lived in Fairbanks until a fall at her home in July 1996 forced her to return to Automba in 1997 where family could look after her. In Minnesota, she was a patron of the "Kalevala Theatre Society". In 1998, Reed was awarded an honorary doctorate for her work on the Alaskan language. In 2000, she was the first person honored in the Barnum High School Hall of Fame. Reed died March 5, 2005, at her home in Automba.

== Publications ==
=== As author ===
==== Books ====
- 1971 — Qunguturaq Naruyayagaq (Little Pet Seagull) together with Paschal Afcan, John Angaiak, and Martha Teeluk
- 1974 — Father Francis Barnum, S.J. together with Joseph Coolidge
- 1975 — Nuyurrilnguut Ungungssit : Domestic Animals together with Sophie Manutoli and Marie Blanchett
- 1975 — Vitus Bering
- 1977 — Yup'ik Eskimo grammar

==== Course material ====
- 1961 — Material for a linguistics course on Yupik at UAF together with Agnes Hootch, Michael E. Krauss, and Martha Teeluk
