= 2026 Algoma District municipal elections =

Ontario elections

Elections were held in the organized municipalities in the Algoma District of Ontario on October 26, 2026, in conjunction with municipal elections across the province.

The following are the results of the mayoral and reeve races in each municipality and the council races in the City of Sault Ste. Marie.

== Blind River ==
=== Mayor ===
Mayor Sally Hagman is not running for re-election. Running to replace her include councillors Jim Dunbar and Jennifer Posteraro.

List of candidates:

| Mayoral Candidate | Vote | % |
|---|---|---|
| Joshua Brown | | |
| Jim Dunbar | | |
| Jennifer Posteraro | | |

== Bruce Mines ==
=== Mayor ===
List of candidates:

| Mayoral Candidate | Vote | % |
|---|---|---|
| Lory Patteri (X) | | |
| Jim McCulloch | | |
| Jody Orto | | |

== Dubreuilville ==
=== Mayor ===
| Mayoral Candidate | Vote | % |
|---|---|---|
| Beverly Nantel (X) | Acclaimed | |

== Elliot Lake ==
=== Mayor ===
Mayor Andrew Wannan is running for re-election.

List of candidates:

| Mayoral Candidate | Vote | % |
|---|---|---|
| Andrew Wannan (X) | | |
| David Csikasz | | |

== Hilton ==
=== Reeve ===
| Reeve Candidate | Vote | % |
|---|---|---|
| Mike Garside | Acclaimed | |

== Hilton Beach ==
=== Mayor ===
| Mayoral Candidate | Vote | % |
|---|---|---|
| Robert Hope (X) | Acclaimed | |

== Hornepayne ==
List of candidates:

=== Mayor ===
| Mayoral Candidate | Vote | % |
|---|---|---|
| Cheryl T. Fort (X) | | |
| Paul Stewart | | |
| Paul James Martin | | |

== Huron Shores ==
List of candidates:

=== Mayor ===
| Mayoral Candidate | Vote | % |
|---|---|---|
| Joseph Monette | | |
| Luke Vine | | |

== Jocelyn ==
=== Reeve ===
| Reeve Candidate | Vote | % |
|---|---|---|
| Cori Murdock (X) | | |
| Angela Harnett | | |
| Sheila Campbell | | |

== Johnson ==
=== Mayor ===
| Mayoral Candidate | Vote | % |
|---|---|---|
| Reginald McKinnon (X) | Acclaimed | |

== Laird ==
List of candidates:

=== Mayor ===
| Mayoral Candidate | Vote | % |
|---|---|---|
| Shawn Evoy (X) | Acclaimed | |

== Macdonald, Meredith and Aberdeen Additional ==
List of candidates:

=== Mayor ===
| Mayoral Candidate | Vote | % |
|---|---|---|
| Lynn Watson (X) | Acclaimed | |

== North Shore, The ==
List of candidates:

=== Mayor ===
| Mayoral Candidate | Vote | % |
|---|---|---|
| Cecilia Luu | | |
| Lisa Bell-Murray | | |

== Plummer Additional ==
List of candidates:

=== Mayor ===
| Mayoral Candidate | Vote | % |
|---|---|---|
| Keith Hoback | | |
| Boris Koehler | | |

== Prince ==
List of candidates:

=== Mayor ===
| Mayoral Candidate | Vote | % |
|---|---|---|
| Melanie Mageran (X) | Acclaimed | |

== Sault Ste. Marie ==
List of candidates:

=== Mayor ===
Mayor Matthew Shoemaker is running for re-election. Running against him is blues musician Josh McNally, environmentalist Selva Rasaiah, truck driver and security consultant Matthew Toffelmire, and Joel Rowswell, the son of former mayor John Rowswell.

| Mayoral Candidate | Vote | % |
|---|---|---|
| Matthew Shoemaker (X) | 12,360 | 49.71 |
| Joel Rowswell | 10,352 | 41.63 |
| Selva Rasaiah | 1,326 | 5.33 |
| Josh McNally | 526 | 2.12 |
| Matthew Toffelmire | 301 | 1.21 |

=== Sault Ste. Marie City Council ===
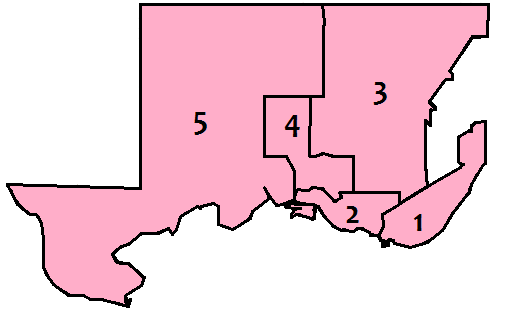
Map of Sault Ste. Marie's five wards

Two elected per ward.

| Candidate | Vote | % |
Ward 1
| Brent Derochie | 3,278 | 30.35 |
| Logan Costa | 2,982 | 27.61 |
| Sonny Spina (X) | 2,471 | 22.88 |
| Dan Pallot | 2,069 | 19.16 |
Ward 2
| Luke Dufour (X) | 2,111 | 25.82 |
| Stephanie Pagnucco | 1,707 | 20.88 |
| Cynthia McCutcheon | 1,083 | 13.24 |
| Mike Doan | 1,075 | 13.15 |
| Judy Hupponen | 993 | 12.14 |
| Dennis Murphy | 568 | 6.95 |
| Derek Pearce | 361 | 4.41 |
| Michael McCartan | 181 | 2.21 |
| Harsh Goyal | 98 | 1.20 |
Ward 3
| Gary Trembinski | 3,094 | 31.55 |
| Luis Moreno | 1,991 | 20.30 |
| Angela Caputo (X) | 1,757 | 17.91 |
| Ron Zagordo (X) | 1,318 | 13.44 |
| Joshua Vierimaa | 857 | 8.74 |
| Nick Delavalle | 791 | |
Ward 4
| Marchy Bruni (X) | 2,601 | 31.80 |
| Stephan Kinach (X) | 1,661 | 20.31 |
| Jennifer Francella-Medeiros | 1,148 | 14.04 |
| Marie McLeod | 1,095 | 13.39 |
| Christine Starzzomski | 904 | 11.05 |
| Jim Penfold | 769 | 9.40 |
Ward 5
| Corey Gardi (X) | 2,050 | 29.66 |
| Matthew Scott (X) | 1,787 | 25.85 |
| Martin Wyant | 1,466 | 21.21 |
| Bobbi-Jo Holmes | 1,161 | 16.80 |
| Dan O'Brien | 448 | 6.48 |

== Spanish ==
=== Mayor ===
| Mayoral Candidate | Vote | % |
|---|---|---|
| Rachel Theriault | | |
| David James Rittberg | | |
| Melanie Talbot | | |

== St. Joseph ==
=== Mayor ===
| Mayoral Candidate | Vote | % |
|---|---|---|
| Joseph Jody Wildman (X) | | |
| Gideon Down | | |

== Tarbutt ==
=== Mayor ===
| Mayoral Candidate | Vote | % |
|---|---|---|
| Lennox Smith (X) | Acclaimed | |

== Thessalon ==
List of candidates:

=== Mayor ===
| Mayoral Candidate | Vote | % |
|---|---|---|
| Jordan Bird (X) | | |
| Scott Dunlop | | |

== Wawa ==
List of candidates:

=== Mayor ===
| Mayoral Candidate | Vote | % |
|---|---|---|
| Melanie Pilon (X) | | |
| Ray Vaillant | | |

== White River ==
List of candidates:

=== Mayor ===
| Mayoral Candidate | Vote | % |
|---|---|---|
| Tara Hart (X) | | |
| Angelo Bazzoni | | |
