= Billy ThunderKloud & the Chieftones =

Canadian country music band

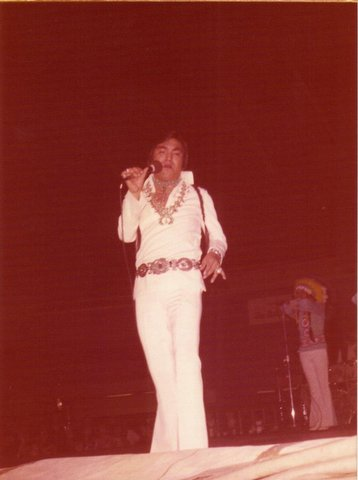
- Billy ThunderKloud

Background information
- Origin: Edmonton, Alberta, Canada
- Genres: Country
- Years active: 1964–1991
- Labels: Superior, 20th Century Fox, Polydor
- Past members: Billy ThunderKloud (Vincent Clifford); Richard Grayowl; Barry Littlestar; Jack Wolf

Billy ThunderKloud & the Chieftones was a Canadian country music band formed in Edmonton, Alberta. It was composed of First Nations musicians Billy ThunderKloud (born Vincent Clifford; May 7, 1948 – June 5, 2018), Hereditary Frog Clan Chief belonging to the Gitksan tribe, along with his brother Barry Littlestar (born Barry Clifford), in northern British Columbia, and Jack Wolf (Jack Cecil), and Richard Grayowl (Richard Douse), from Edmonton.

Formed in 1964, and originally billed as "Canada's All-Indian Band", the group released two singles on 20th Century Fox Records in 1975, reaching number 16 on Billboard Hot Country Songs, number 32 on Hot Adult Contemporary Tracks and number 92 on the Billboard Hot 100 with "What Time of Day", and number 37 on Billboard Hot Country Songs with "Pledging My Love". That same year, ThunderKloud was honored by the American Indian Exposition as the "Outstanding Indian of the Year". Billy and the Chieftones performed at President Nixon's second Inaugural Ball in 1973. ThunderKloud is a Kentucky Colonel commissioned by the Governor of Kentucky and was also named an honorary Shriner. After 20th Century Fox closed its record label, the band moved to Polydor Records, charting with "It's Alright" and covers of "Indian Reservation (The Lament of the Cherokee Reservation Indian)" and "Try a Little Tenderness". In 1976, Billy ThunderKloud was a recipient of an ASCAP Country Music Award for "Try a Little Tenderness".

In 1966, Vincent Clifford appeared as himself on the December 26, 1966, episode of To Tell The Truth where he was introduced, along with two imposters, as lead singer of the Chieftones band. Tom Poston was the only panelist to correctly identify Clifford. After Clifford's identity was revealed, the band performed live, on-stage, for the studio and TV viewing audience.

Their song "I Shouldn't Have Did What I Done" is featured on the 2014 compilation album Native North America, Vol. 1. The album was nominated for Best Historical Album at the 2016 Grammy Awards.

After seeing a performance of Billy ThunderKloud and the Chieftones at Walt Disney World, Walt Disney himself gave his personal pet mountain lion to Billy as a gift. His name was Sim-Au-Git and he traveled with the band on their tour bus.

Billy ThunderKloud continued touring until he retired at the end of 1991. He performed a few times in the years that followed. He died due to complications from a stroke and pneumonia at his home in Palm City, FL on June 5, 2018. He is survived by his wife, Bev; daughters Shawnee and Chey; and three grandchildren. His first wife, and the mother of his two children (Shawnee and Chey) was Susan (Lawrence) Clifford of Richland Center, WI, then of Nashville, TN where Billy was managed by Buddy Lee talent agency.

== Discography ==
=== Albums ===
Year	Album details	Peak chart positions
Year	Album details	US Country
All Through the Night	Release date: 1973; Label: Superior Records	—
Where Do I Begin to Tell a Story	Release date: 1974; Label: Superior Records	—
Off the Reservation	Release date: 1974; Label: 20th Century Fox Records	—
What Time of Day	Release date: 1975; Label: 20th Century Fox Records	31
I Want to Be Touched by You	Release date: 1980; Label: CheyShawnee Records	

=== Singles ===
Year	Single	Peak chart positions				Album
Year	Single	US Country	US	US AC	AUS	Album
1975	"What Time of Day" (featuring the Franklin Road Academy; uncredited)	16	92	32	60	What Time of Day
1975	"Pledging My Love"	37	—	—	—	—
1976	"Indian Reservation (The Lament of the Cherokee Reservation Indian)"	74	—	—	—	—
1976	"Try a Little Tenderness"	47	—	—	—	—
1976	"It's Alright"	77	—	—	—	—
1977	"Oklahoma Wind"	—	—	—	—	—
