= Willy Mitchell =

Canadian First Nations musician (born 1953)

Willy Mitchell (born Percy Williams; 1953) is a Canadian First Nations musician. Mitchell recorded and toured mostly in the 1970s with his Desert River Band. He co-organized the 1980 Sweet Grass festival in Val-d'Or, Quebec, which gathered Inuit and First Nations musicians from across Canada.

== Biography ==
Mitchell was born Percy Williams in Malone, New York, in 1953, after his Algonquin and Mohawk parents were turned away from a hospital in Cornwall, Ontario. He was raised in Kitigan-Zibi in southern Quebec by his maternal grandmother. His grandmother gave him the nickname "Willy".

In 1968, he started touring northern Quebec with his first band, called the Northern Lights Group. In January 1969, Mitchell was shot in the head by a police officer during an altercation over stolen Christmas lights. Mitchell was originally reported dead by the media. He used the money from a settlement resulting from the incident to buy a Fender Telecaster Thinline guitar. After recovering, he formed the Desert River Band, and began touring and recording. Mitchell wrote the song "Big Police Man" about the experience.

Mitchell and the Desert River Band performed live for Ottawa's CJOH-TV's program, New Faces, in 1970, and began touring heavily after that. Mitchell spent four years at the all-First Nations Manitou Community College, in La Macaza, Quebec, where he studied traditional botany, photography, and film making. In 1980, with Janine Poirier Macdonald, Mitchell organized a festival featuring his contemporaries in the First Nations and Inuit music industry. Called the Sweet Grass Festival, performers included were Willie Dunn, Roger House, Willie Thrasher, and Morley Loon, whom Mitchell worked with frequently. The Canadian Broadcasting Corporation's Northern Service recorded the performances, and released an LP, Sweet Grass Music, in 1982. Mitchell released several privately printed albums in the 1990s, and currently lives in Dolbeau-Mistassini, Quebec.
