= 2026 Simcoe County municipal elections =

In Ontario, Canada

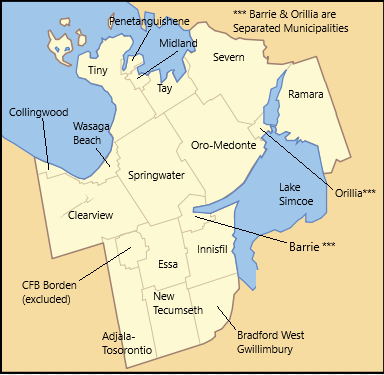
Map of Simcoe County, its component municipalities, Separated municipalities and CFB Borden.

Elections will be held in Simcoe County, Ontario on October 26, 2026 in conjunction with municipal elections across the province.

== Simcoe County Council ==
Following the passage of the "Better Regional Governance Act", the provincial government will appoint the Warden of the county, and shrink the size of council to 17, eliminating the deputy mayor positions. County Council will thus consist of the mayors of the county's 16 municipalities plus the chair.

Office	Elected
Warden	Appointed by provincial government
Mayor of Adjala-Tosorontio	Scott W. Anderson
Mayor of Bradford West Gwillimbury	Nickolas Harper
Mayor of Clearview	Robert McArthur
Mayor of Collingwood	Yvonne Hamlin
Mayor of Essa	Sandie Macdonald
Mayor of Innisfil	Kenneth Fowler
Mayor of Midland	Bill Gordon
Mayor of New Tecumseth	Stephanie MacLellan
Mayor of Oro-Medonte	Randy Greenlaw
Mayor of Penetanguishene	Doug Rawson (acclaimed)
Mayor of Ramara	Keith Bell
Mayor of Severn	Mike Burkett
Mayor of Springwater	Jennifer Coughlin
Mayor of Tay	Ted Walker (acclaimed)
Mayor of Tiny	Dave Brunelle
Mayor of Wasaga Beach	

== Adjala-Tosorontio ==
=== Mayor ===
List of candidates:

Mayoral Candidate	Vote	%
Scott W. Anderson (X)	1,811	40%
Bob Meadows	1,576	35%
Anub Simson	828	18%
Steven Stogrin	297	7%

== Bradford West Gwillimbury ==
List of candidates:

=== Mayor ===
Challenging mayor James Leduc was Ward 5 councillor Peter Gerragine, businessman Mauro Di Giovanni, Ward 6 councillor Nickolas Harper,Deputy Mayor Raj Sandhu, and entrepreneur Emil Alkhanov.

Mayoral Candidate	Vote	%
Nickolas Harper	4,579	30.75
Peter Ferragine	4,229	28.40
Raj Sandhu	2,792	18.75
Mauro Di Giovanni	1,519	10.20
James Leduc (X)	1,497	10.05
Emil Alkhanov	276	1.85

=== Deputy mayor ===
Deputy Mayoral Candidate	Vote	%
Joseph G. Giordano	7,473	51.39
Stephanie Sinclair	6,190	42.56
Yolan Williams	880	6.05

=== Bradford West Gwillimbury Town Council ===
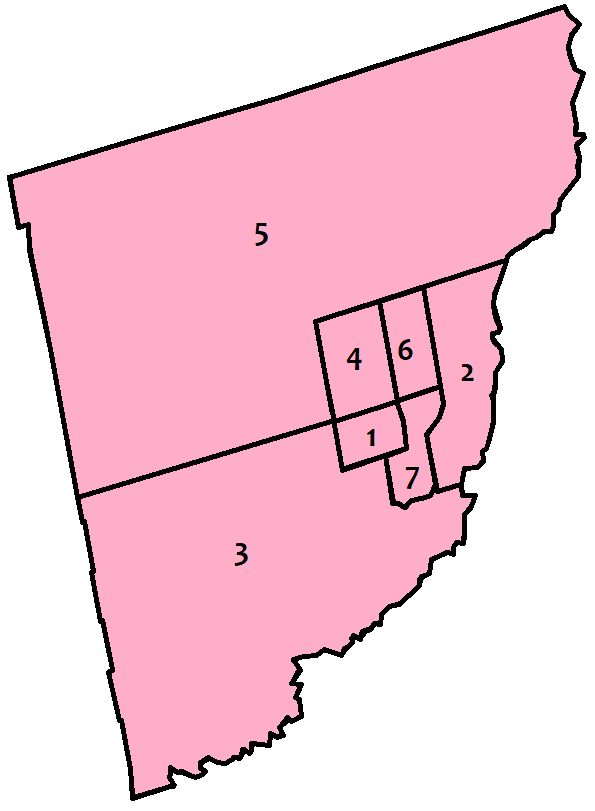
Map of Bradford West Gwillimbury's seven wards

Candidate	Vote	%
Ward 1
Cheraldean Duhaney (X)	924	27.47
Jeff Bellamy	850	25.27
Charlie Shaw	608	18.07
Marianna Calamia	308	9.16
Kimberly Harvey	210	6.24
Vikas Patel	197	5.86
Bibi Ganesh	141	4.19
Aftab Hussain	126	3.75
Ward 2
Jennifer Harrison	1,085	60.61
Alfie Cavallo	435	24.30
David Cummings	270	15.08
Ward 3
Ben Verkaik (X)	455	77.91
Carlos Botelho	114	19.52
Rahmat Mansoor	15	2.57
Ward 4
Kash Toor	941	35.73
David Pullara	822	31.21
Salvatore Morra	406	15.41
Jamal Pascall	263	9.98
Dhwanish Vaidya	106	4.02
Henry Egharevba	96	3.64
Ward 5
Darryl Eek	885	69.79
Munawar Chudary	383	30.21
Ward 6
Elizabeth Lambert	1,041	39.89
Brent Fellman	736	28.20
Tristan Daniels	695	26.63
Matthew Patullo	138	5.29
Ward 7
Peter Dykie (X)	1,512	62.35
Stanley Joseph	913	37.65

== Clearview ==
=== Mayor ===
List of candidates:

Mayoral Candidate	Vote	%
Robert McArthur	3,076	59%
Doug Measures (X)	2,168	41%

== Collingwood ==
=== Mayor ===
Mayor Yvonne Hamlin is running for re-election. Running against her is Town Councillor Kathy Jeffery, former Town Councillor Norman Sandberg, and entrepreneur Jonathan Hillis.

List of candidates:

Mayoral Candidate	Vote	%
Yvonne Hamlin (X)	3,859	38%
Norm Sandberg	2,519	25%
Kathy Jeffery	2,065	20%
Jon Hollis	1,674	17%

== Essa ==
=== Mayor ===
Mayor Sandie Macdonald is running for re-election.

List of candidates:

Mayoral Candidate	Vote	%
Sandie Macdonald (X)	2,445	84%
Francesco Lo Greco	479	16%

== Innisfil ==
List of candidates:

=== Mayor ===
Mayor Lynn Dollin was challenged by Deputy Mayor Kenneth Fowler.

Mayoral Candidate	Vote	%
Kenneth Fowler	5,705	43.92
Lynn Dollin (X)	4,295	33.06
Travis Romer	1,503	11.57
Dana Stott	1,487	11.45

=== Deputy mayor ===
Deputy Mayoral Candidate	Vote	%
Rob Nicol	6,370	51.51
Dave Cockburn	4,580	37.03
Fillip Letichever	1,417	11.46

=== Innisfil Town Council ===
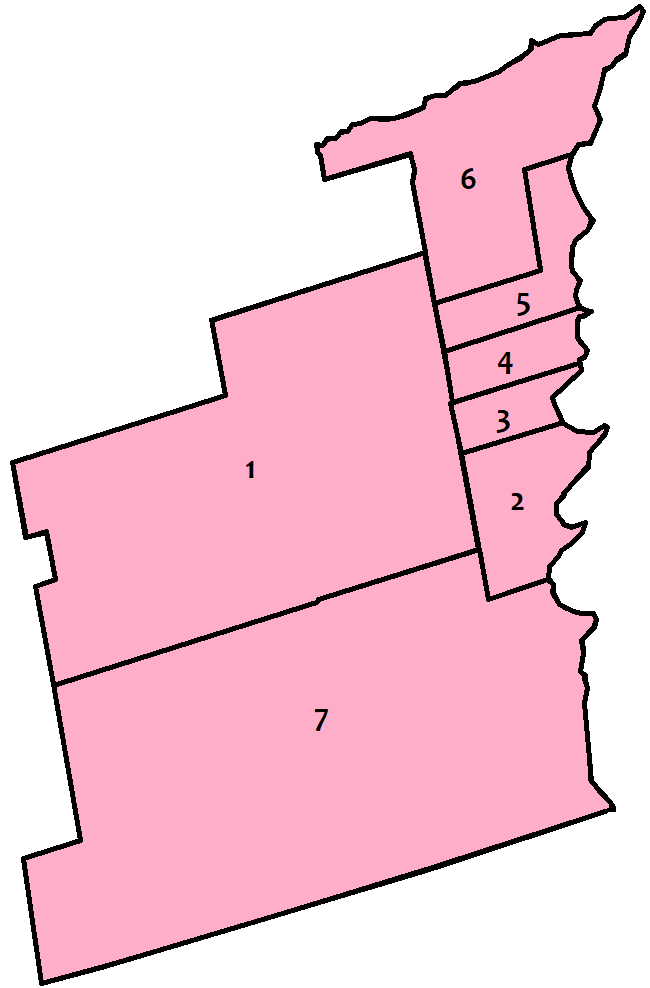
Map of Innisfil's seven wards

Candidate	Vote	%
Ward 1
Paul Veloso	852	63.77
Kevin Eisses (X)	399	29.87
Scott Newman	85	6.36
Ward 2
Carol Griffith	1,008	42.25
Susan Bennett	693	29.04
Grace Constantine (X)	424	17.77
Ignasius Croos	171	7.17
Anil Dutta	90	3.77
Ward 3
Nina La Costa	791	32.29
Alison Jacks	628	25.63
Jennifer Richardson (X)	612	24.98
Andrew Harrigan	419	17.10
Ward 4
Melissa Faria	543	33.33
Deb McGrath	529	32.47
Alan Cugliari	306	18.78
Tricia Khan	251	15.41
Ward 5
Karen Brown	637	54.77
Dan Davidson	404	34.74
Linda Zanella (X)	122	10.49
Ward 6
Robert Saunders (X)	1,132	63.42
Keisha Knibbs	653	36.58
Ward 7
Fred Drodge (X)	1,313	63.16
Rita Ditaranto	766	36.84

== Midland ==
=== Mayor ===
Mayor Bill Gordon is being challenged by longtime resident Ute Schmid-Jones.

List of candidates:

Mayoral Candidate	Vote	%
Bill Gordon (X)	4,006	82%
Ute Schmid-Jones	895	18%

== New Tecumseth ==
List of candidates:

=== Mayor ===
Mayor Richard Norcross ran for re-election. Deputy Mayor Stephanie MacLellan ran against him. Jaison Waldman challenged both incumbents.

Mayoral Candidate	Vote	%
Stephanie MacLellan	7,100	61.79
Richard Norcross (X)	3,982	34.66
Jaison Waldman	408	3.55

=== Deputy mayor ===
Deputy Mayoral Candidate	Vote	%
Marc Biss	8,393	75.78%
Steven Dollmaier	2,682	24.22%

=== New Tecumseth Town Council ===
The New Tecumseth Town Council will be reduced from having eight ward councillors to seven.

Map of New Tecumseth's seven new wards

Candidate	Vote	%
Ward 1
Chris Rapin (X)	1,028	77.47%
James Dougall	299	22.53%
Ward 2
Wendy Gabrek (X)	742	51.82%
Jason Shand	690	48.18%
Ward 3
Tony Phekoo	845	52.68%
Laurie Mortimer	759	47.32%
Ward 4
Alan Masters (X)	1,631	77.89%
Ben Miadovnik	463	22.11%
Ward 5
Nicole Cox (X)	1,362	75.12%
Peter Barbati	451	24.88%
Ward 6
Shira Harrison McIntyre (X)	619	38.21%
Kyle Warren	599	36.98%
Joseph Castellano	335	20.68%
Shannon Rose	67	4.14%
Ward 7
Andrea Jacks (X)	775	54.35%
Dianna Del Bianco	491	34.43%
Stefano Mercuri	160	11.22%

== Oro-Medonte ==
Mayor Randy Greenlaw is running for re-election. He is being challenged by former Ward 3 councillor Cathy Keane.

=== Mayor ===
List of candidates:

Mayoral Candidate	Vote	%
Randy Greenlaw (X)	3,795	45%
Cathy Keane	3,405	40%
Joanie Pritchet	1,277	15%

== Penetanguishene ==
=== Mayor ===
List of candidates:

Mayoral Candidate	Vote	%
Doug Rawson (X)	Acclaimed	

== Ramara ==
=== Mayor ===
Mayor Basil Clarke is not running for re-election. Running to replace him is deputy mayor Keith Bell, Ward 5 councillor Sherri Bell and musician Jim Cronk.

List of candidates:

Mayoral Candidate	Vote	%
Keith Bell	2,704	50%
Sherri Bell	1,622	30%
Jim Cronk	1,081	20%

== Severn ==
=== Mayor ===
Mayor Mike Burkett is running for re-election. He is being challenged by former councillor Jane Dunlop (mother of MPP Jill Dunlop) and political newcomer Danielle Falardeau.

List of candidates:

Mayoral Candidate	Vote	%
Mike Burkett (X)	3,453	62%
Jane Dunlop	1,630	29%
Danielle Falardeau	475	9%

== Springwater ==
Mayor Jennifer Coughlin is running for re-election. She is being challenged by Deputy Mayor George Cabral.

=== Mayor ===
List of candidates:

Mayoral Candidate	Vote	%
Jennifer Coughlin (X)	3,535	56%
George Cabral	2,798	44%

== Tay ==
=== Mayor ===
List of candidates:

Mayoral Candidate	Vote	%
Ted Walker (X)	Acclaimed	

== Tiny ==
=== Mayor ===
Mayor David Evans is running for re-election. Running against him is councillor Dave Brunelle, and CEO of Health-E-Now Medical Network David Kohler.

List of candidates:

Mayoral Candidate	Vote	%
Dave Brunelle	3,515	40%
David Kohler	2,661	30%
David Evans (X)	2,194	25%
Chuck Stradling	455	5%

== Wasaga Beach ==
=== Mayor ===
Mayor Brian Smith is running for re-election, declaring his intent in 2025.

List of candidates:

Mayoral Candidate	Vote	%
Brian Smith (X)		
Mark Winegarden		
Leslie Farkas		
Christopher Stasoff		
Raven Broughton		
