= 2026 Lambton County municipal elections =

Ontario elections

Elections were held in Lambton County, Ontario on October 26, 2026, in conjunction with municipal elections across the province.

== Lambton County Council ==
Lambton County Council includes the mayors of each constituent municipality, the deputy mayors of Lambton Shores and St. Clair, plus four city/county councillors from Sarnia.

Position	Elected
Brooke-Alvinston Mayor	
Dawn-Euphemia Mayor	Alan Broad (acclaimed)
Enniskillen Mayor	Kevin Marriott (acclaimed)
Lambton Shores Mayor	Jeff Wilcox
Lambton Shores Deputy Mayor	Dan Sageman
Oil Springs Mayor	Ian Veen (acclaimed)
Petrolia Mayor	Joel Field (acclaimed)
Plympton-Wyoming Mayor	Gary L. Atkinson
Point Edward Mayor	Greg Grimes
Sarnia Mayor	Carrie McEachran
Sarnia Councillor	Andrew Stokley
Sarnia Councillor	Lo-Anne Chan
Sarnia Councillor	Richard C. Felton
Sarnia Councillor	Terry Burrell
St. Clair Mayor	Jeff Agar
St. Clair Deputy Mayor	Steve Arnold (acclaimed)
Warwick Mayor	Todd Case (acclaimed)

== Brooke-Alvinston ==
=== Mayor ===
List of candidates:

Mayoral Candidate	Vote	%
James I. Armstrong		
Tom Scott		
Marcus Deloughery		
Don McCabe		

=== Councillor ===
List of candidates (four to be elected):

Candidate	Vote	%
Gregory Hilliard		
Craig Sanders (X)		
Wayne Deans		
Jenny Redick (X)		
Dianne MacDougall		
Frank Nemcek (X)		

== Dawn-Euphemia ==
=== Mayor ===
List of candidates:

Mayoral Candidate	Vote	%
Alan Broad (X)	Acclaimed	

== Enniskillen ==
Mayor Kevin Karriott, and the entire municipal council were elected by acclamation.

=== Mayor ===
List of candidates:

Mayoral Candidate	Vote	%
Kevin Marriott (X)	Acclaimed	

=== Councillor ===
List of candidates (four to be elected):

Candidate	Vote	%
Judy Krall (X)	Acclaimed	
Chad Burke (X)	Acclaimed	
Tim Williams (X)	Acclaimed	
Jason Armstrong	Acclaimed	

== Lambton Shores ==
=== Mayor ===
Mayor Doug Cook is running for re-election.

List of candidates:

Mayoral Candidate	Vote	%
Jeff Wilcox	3,020	63%
Doug Cook (X)	1,781	37%

=== Deputy Mayor ===
List of candidates:

Candidate	Vote	%
Dan Sageman (X)	2,616	
Marilyn Smith	2,008	

=== Councillor - Ward 1 ===
List of candidates:

Candidate	Vote	%
Chris Vanderydt	506	
Randy McClinchey	198	
Sarah Nicholson	132	

=== Councillor - Ward 2 ===
List of candidates:

Candidate	Vote	%
Dave Maguire	Acclaimed	

=== Councillor - Ward 3 ===
List of candidates:

Candidate	Vote	%
Shawn Dickey	Acclaimed	

=== Councillor - Ward 4 ===
List of candidates:

Candidate	Vote	%
David Pugh	403	
David McLean	326	

=== Councillor - Ward 5 ===
List of candidates:

Candidate	Vote	%
Suzanne Shea	447	
Jim Hansen	288	

=== Councillor - Ward 6 ===
List of candidates:

Candidate	Vote	%
Dave Marsh (X)	Acclaimed	

=== Councillor - Ward 7 ===
List of candidates:

Candidate	Vote	%
Randy Shaw	566	
Jeffrey Girling	178	

== Oil Springs ==
=== Mayor ===
List of candidates:

Mayoral Candidate	Vote	%
Ian Veen (X)	Acclaimed	

== Petrolia ==
=== Mayor ===
Deputy mayor Joel Field has been elected mayor by acclamation.

List of candidates:

Mayoral Candidate	Vote	%
Joel Field	Acclaimed	

=== Councillor ===
List of candidates (six to be elected):

Candidate	Vote	%
Bill Clark (X)		
Miranda Cole		
Ethan Brown		
John Alexander McDonald		
Greg Nemcek		

== Plympton-Wyoming ==
=== Mayor ===
Mayor Gary Atkinson is being challenged by former councillor Tim Wilkins.

List of candidates:

Mayoral Candidate	Vote	%
Gary L. Atkinson (X)	2,061	56%
Tim Wilkins	1,633	44%

=== Deputy Mayor ===
List of candidates:

Candidate	Vote	%
Netty McEwan	2,430	
Brad Zantingh	1,120	

=== Councillor ===
List of candidates (five to be elected):

Candidate	Vote	%
Alex Boughen (X)	2,466	
John van Klaveren (X)	2,164	
Mike Vasey (X)	2,075	
Kristen Rodrigues (X)	1,980	
Bob Woolvett (X)	1,808	
Ruth Vanderburgt	1,575	
Jessica Jessome	1,254	
John Colling	833	

== Point Edward ==
=== Mayor ===
List of candidates:

Mayoral Candidate	Vote	%
Greg Grimes	510	51%
Paul Burgess	494	49%

=== Councillor ===
List of candidates (four to be elected):

Candidate	Vote	%
Paul Churchill	641	
Doug Booth	537	
Kevin Devine	515	
Louie Mele	510	
Bev Hand	443	
Gary Capp	354	
Kristen Simpson	215	
Patty Yazbeck	109	
Michael Brocklehurst	69	
Arianna Noctor	57	
Carla Pacheco	33	

== Sarnia ==
The following are the candidates for mayor and city council of Sarnia.

=== Mayor ===
As of the end of the official nomination period, the candidates include (in order of their registration) City/County Councillor Bill Dennis, business owner Scott Molson, local chamber of commerce chief executive Carrie McEachran, professional engineer George Stanko, and the incumbent, Mayor Mike Bradley. Former candidate Chrissy McRoberts withdrew her nomination for mayor to run instead for City/County Councillor. Stanko withdrew after the deadline and endorsed Molson. Former MP for Sarnia—Lambton, Patricia Davidson, endorsed McEachran, as did McRoberts.

Mayoral Candidate	Vote	%
Carrie McEachran	13,828	47.30
Mike Bradley (X)	7,185	24.58
Bill Dennis	5,899	20.18
Scott Molson	2,207	7.55
George Stanko	114	0.39

=== Sarnia City Council ===
==== City and County ====
Four to be elected

Candidate	Vote	%
Chrissy McRoberts (X)	11,930	12.84
Adam Kilner (X)	9,939	10.70
Mario Fazio	8,784	9.46
Brian White (X)	8,619	9.28
George Vandenberg (X)	8,369	9.01
John Richardson	5,929	6.38
Andy Bruziewicz	5,339	5.75
Mike Stark	5,339	5.75
Patrick Coutu	5,065	5.45
Margaret Bird	4,934	5.31
Paul Wiersma	4,767	5.13
Ed Gresham	3,171	3.41
Al Duffy	3,162	3.40
Charmaine Murray	2,551	2.75
Mark Lamore	2,353	2.53
Bill Anning	1,774	1.91
Peter Goodman	872	0.94

==== City Council ====
Four to be elected

Candidate	Vote	%
Andrew Stokley	10,236	11.94
Lo-Anne Chan	9,617	11.21
Dick Felton	'8,632	10.07
Terry Burrell (X)	8,226	9.59
Anne Marie Gillis (X)	7,990	9.32
Michelle Parks	7,395	8.62
Nathan Colquhoun	4,986	5.81
Hari Srinivasan	4,253	4.96
Tammy Mathieson	3,892	4.64
Christopher Oram	3,041	3.55
Clara James	2,945	3.43
Christopher Pettit	2,647	3.09
Steve Devlin	2,315	2.70
Josh Coutts-Smith	1,792	2.09
Scott Spinks Jr.	1,475	1.72
David Ghobril	1,348	1.57
Jonathon Walker	1,309	1.53
Briana Reid	1,161	1.35
Honie Chumko	1,011	1.18
Ray McMaster	993	1.16
Roza Panjehbandpour (Phox)	402	0.47

== St. Clair ==
List of candidates:

=== Mayor ===
Mayor Jeff Agar is being challenged by business consultant Bruce Gibson.

Mayoral Candidate	Vote	%
Jeff Agar (X)	3,625	76%
Bruce Gibson	1,114	24%

=== Deputy Mayor ===
Candidate	Vote	%
Steve Arnold	Acclaimed	

=== Councillor - Ward 1 ===
List of candidates (three to be elected):

Candidate	Vote	%
Tracy Kingston	2,355	
Alex Machan	2,114	
Holly Foster (X)	1,904	
Pat Brown (X)	1,729	
Cathy Langis (X)	1,628	

=== Councillor - Ward 2 ===
List of candidates (two to be elected):

Candidate	Vote	%
Brad Langstaff (X)	Acclaimed	
Bill Meyers (X)	Acclaimed	

== Warwick ==
=== Mayor ===
Mayor Todd Case has been re-elected mayor by acclamation.

List of candidates:

Mayoral Candidate	Vote	%
Todd Case (X)	Acclaimed	

=== Councillor ===
List of candidates (four to be elected):

Candidate	Vote	%
Jane Joris	800	
Joe Manning (X)	779	
John Couwenberg (X)	682	
Wayne Morris (X)	654	
Marty Vanos	582	
Steve Kettler	127	
