= Native North America, Vol. 1 =

Compilation album by Various artists
- Released: November 25, 2014
- Genre: First Nations music
- Label: Light in the Attic Records
- Producer: Kevin "Sipreano" Howes

Native North America, Vol. 1: Aboriginal Folk, Rock, and Country 1966–1985 is a compilation album released in 2014 on Light in the Attic Records.

Compiled by Kevin "Sipreano" Howes, the album collects rare and out of print recordings by First Nations, Métis and Inuit musicians from Canada and Alaska.

With many of the artists poorly documented in media sources, Howes travelled extensively to interview and document the musicians for the album's booklet. The songs were remastered from the original recordings, which in many cases existed only in Canadian Broadcasting Corporation archives.

A second volume, featuring musicians from the Contiguous United States and Mexico, is slated for future release.

In August 2015, the Plug In Institute of Contemporary Art in Winnipeg, Manitoba staged an event dedicated to the album, featuring appearances by Howes and contributing musician Shingoose, and screenings of the aboriginal-themed documentary films The Paradox of Norval Morrisseau and The Other Side of the Ledger.

The album was a longlisted nominee for the 2015 Polaris Music Prize. The album received a Grammy Award nomination for best historical album in December 2015.

== Track listing ==
1. Willie Dunn, "I Pity the Country"
2. John Angaiak, "I'll Rock You to the Rhythm of the Ocean"
3. Sugluk, "Fall Away"
4. Sikumiut, "Sikumiut"
5. Willie Thrasher, "Spirit Child"
6. Willy Mitchell, "Call of the Moose"
7. Lloyd Cheechoo, "James Bay"
8. Alexis Utatnaq, "Maqaivvigivalauqtavut"
9. Brian Davey, "Dreams of Ways"
10. Morley Loon, "N'Doheeno"
11. Peter Frank, "Little Feather"
12. Ernest Monias, "Tormented Soul"
13. Eric Landry, "Out of the Blue"
14. David Campbell, "Sky-Man and the Moon"
15. Willie Dunn, "Son of the Sun"
16. Shingoose with Duke Redbird, "Silver River"
17. Willy Mitchell and Desert River Band, "Kill'n Your Mind"
18. Philippe McKenzie, "Mistashipu"
19. Willie Thrasher, "Old Man Carver"
20. Lloyd Cheechoo, "Winds of Change"
21. The Chieftones, "I Shouldn't Have Did What I Done"
22. Sugluk, "I Didn't Know"
23. Lawrence Martin, "I Got My Music"
24. Gordon Dick, "Siwash Rock"
25. Willy Mitchell and Desert River Band, "Birchbark Letter"
26. William Tagoona, "Anaanaga"
27. Leland Bell, "Messenger"
28. Saddle Lake Drifting Cowboys, "Modern Rock"
29. Willie Thrasher, "We Got to Take You Higher"
30. Sikumiut, "Utirumavunga"
31. Sugluk, "Ajuinnarasuarsunga"
32. John Angaiak, "Hey, Hey, Hey, Brother"
33. Groupe Folklorique Montagnais, "Tshekuan Mak Tshetutamak"
34. Willie Dunn and Jerry Saddleback, "Peruvian Dream"
