= Four Directions (TV series) =

- Genre: Drama anthology
- Written by: Thomas King; Duke Redbird; Serena Mis-Ta-Nash; Paul Kuster
- Country of origin: Canada
- No. of seasons: 1
- No. of episodes: 4

Production
- Producers: Angela Bruce; Maryke McEwen; Bonnie Siegel
- Running time: 30 min.

Original release
- Network: CBC Television
- Release: November 28 – December 19, 1996

Four Directions is a Canadian drama anthology television series that aired on CBC Television in 1996. The series consisted of four half-hour teleplays about First Nations characters and stories.

== Background ==
First announced in 1992 as a 13-week series focusing on "the diversity of First Nations cultures", the planned series was reduced to eight, then to six and finally to four episodes by the time it actually went into production in 1994. In addition to writing one of the four episodes, Thomas King served as story editor for the series.

In addition to the episodes produced, rejected scripts were also submitted by Evan Adams and Drew Hayden Taylor.

Despite the episodes being completed in 1994, the series remained unscheduled for another two years until the network decided in 1996 to air it as a companion piece to the long-running drama series North of 60, which was at that time nearing the end of its run and airing a reduced number of episodes. Accordingly, two weeks in the fall of 1996 were chosen, during which two episodes of Four Directions would air in the North of 60 time slot.

During the delays in producing and scheduling the series, King publicly criticized the CBC for not undertaking sufficient effort to ensure that First Nations people were given the opportunity to get involved in and learn the production process.

== Episodes ==
No.	Title	Directed by	Written by	Original release date
1	"A Canoe for the Making"	George Bloomfield	Duke Redbird	November 28, 1996
After committing an act of domestic violence against his wife, a young man (Kennetch Charlette) is taken to a secluded island by his father-in-law (Gordon Tootoosis), and forced to help build a birch-bark canoe as a challenge to confront his alcoholism and reconnect with his indigenous spirituality and heritage.
2	"Borders"	Gil Cardinal	Thomas King	November 28, 1996
On a planned trip to Utah, Olive (Wendy Walker) is trapped on the Canada–United States border when American customs agents deny her entry because she has declared her nationality as Blackfoot rather than Canadian, but the Canadian agents won't let her back into Canada for the same reason.
3	"Flat Mountain Taxtales"	Kit Hood	Serena Mis-Ta-Nash	December 19, 1996
An elderly couple (Diana Delorme and Winston Wuttunee) squatting in an abandoned property in Haines Junction, Yukon are astonished and mystified when they receive a tax assessment from Revenue Canada.
4	"The Hero"	Gary Farmer	Paul Kuster	December 19, 1996
Two young roommates in Toronto compare their radically different perspectives on their aboriginal heritage.
