= Shingoose =

Canadian folk musician (1946–2021)

- Born: 26 October 1946; Winnipeg, Manitoba
- Died: January 12, 2021 (aged 74) Winnipeg, Manitoba
- Genre: Folk
- Years active: 1961–2012

Curtis Jonnie (26 October 1946 – 12 January 2021), better known by his stage name Shingoose, was an Ojibwe singer and songwriter from Canada. He played in Roy Buchanan's band during the early part of his career. He also recorded with Bruce Cockburn in his first album, Native Country. Shingoose was inducted into the Manitoba Music Hall of Fame in 2012.

== Early life ==
Shingoose was born in Winnipeg, Manitoba, on 26 October 1946. He was a member of the Roseau River Anishinabe First Nation. At the age of four, he was adopted by a Mennonite family in Steinbach as part of the Sixties Scoop. As a child in Steinbach, he grew up with Patrick Friesen, who later became a notable poet. He began singing in church choirs, and joined the Nebraska-based Boystown Concert Choir after moving to the United States at age 15. In the late 1960s and 1970s, he performed with several rock and rhythm and blues bands in Washington, D.C., and New York City, including a stint in Roy Buchanan's band.

== Career ==
Shingoose returned to Winnipeg in 1973. Inspired by the contemporaneous American Indian Movement, he began performing as a singer-songwriter, adopting his great-grandfather's name. His first recording, Native Country in 1975, featured contributions from Bruce Cockburn. That album was the only one released on the Indigenous record label founded by him named "Native Country". Even though the label existed only for a brief period of time, Shingoose was described as a "visionary ahead of his time" for having created it. In that same decade, he signed a songwriting deal with Glen Campbell for five years. The partnership eventually folded when Campbell changed his musical focus. Shingoose also toured extensively across Canada, performing shows in clubs and university campuses and on the folk festival circuit. His second album, Ballad of Norval, was released in 1979.

In the early 1980s, Shingoose collaborated with Don Marks and Bill Britain on the First Nations musical play InDEO, in which he starred. He and Marks later cofounded Native Multimedia Productions, a television production company which created the First Nations current affairs program Full Circle, later retitled First Nations Magazine, for CKND-TV, and the 1989 television special Indian Time for CTV. He was the host of the former program, and was one of the performers in the latter. He was also a correspondent on First Nations issues for CTV's Canada AM.

Shingoose hosted a three-part documentary series for CBC Radio in 1991 on First Nations music. He also worked in aboriginal programming and policy development for TVOntario, and as director of education for the Canada Arts Foundation. He later served as chair of the Juno Awards committee administering the Juno Award for Aboriginal Album of the Year, and raised funds for an aboriginal cultural centre in Winnipeg. His song "Treaty Rights" was adopted as an anthem of the 2007 Aboriginal Day of Action.

== Later life and death ==
Shingoose had a stroke in 2012 that left him with partial paralysis. Marks organized a fundraising concert to assist him with medical and living expenses, which featured Eagle & Hawk, Ray St. Germain, Mark Nabess, Dustin Harder, Jesse Green and Don Amero. He was enshrined into the Manitoba Music Hall of Fame that year.

"Silver River", a track he recorded in collaboration with poet Duke Redbird for his 1975 release Native Country, is featured on the 2014 compilation album Native North America, Vol. 1. The album was nominated for a Grammy Award.

During the COVID-19 pandemic in Manitoba, Shingoose died from the virus at a care home in Winnipeg, on 12 January 2021 and at the age of 74.

== Albums ==
- Native Country (1975)
- Ballad of Norval (1979)
- Natural Tan (1989)
- T-Bird in the Lake (2007)
