= Lawrence Martin (musician) =

Canadian musician and politician

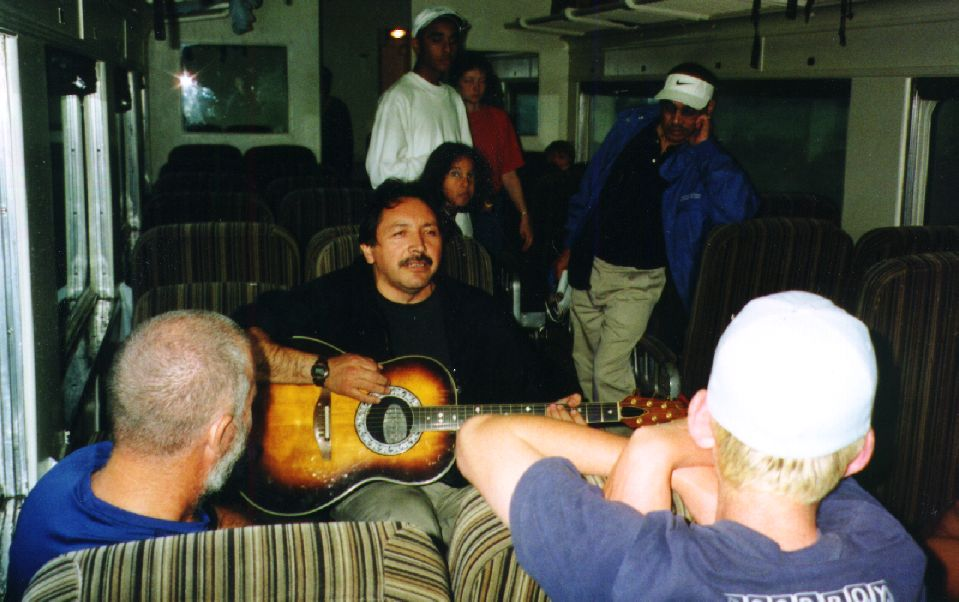
Lawrence Martin aka Wapistan playing guitar and singing on board of Polar Bear Express.

Lawrence Martin (born January 1956 in Moose Factory, Ontario) is a Canadian musician and politician. He has used the name Wapistan, derived from the Cree language word for the marten, in his musical work.

== Background ==
A member of the Moose Cree First Nation, he grew up in a small community called Moose River Crossing. As in the Cree traditional communities, the whole hamlet became his family. One of his aunts, Abba, recognized his talent for music at an early age. She bought him an acoustic guitar and taught him to play. Once he learned how to strum three chords, he began to write songs. He was around twelve years old at that time. From the age of fourteen, he attended secondary school in North Bay.

In the 1980s, Martin was executive director of the Wawatay Native Communications Society, a First Nations broadcaster in Northern Ontario. In this role, in 1989 he produced the first-ever television broadcast of a First Nations pow-wow.

== Politics ==
He became mayor of Sioux Lookout, Ontario, in 1991, becoming the first aboriginal person in the province ever elected to the mayoralty of a municipality that was not a First Nations reserve. He served in that position until 1994, and then took a job with the Nishnawbe-Aski Police Service.

In 1998, he was elected to his first term as grand chief of the Mushkegowuk Council, serving until 2001. During this time he ran as a candidate for the leadership of the Assembly of First Nations in its 2000 leadership election, but was not elected.

He later moved to Cochrane, Ontario, becoming executive director of the local Native Friendship Centre. He was elected mayor of that town in 2003, becoming one of the few Canadian politicians ever to have held the mayoralty of two different municipalities. He served as mayor of Cochrane until 2010.

He was elected to a second term as grand chief of the Mushkegowuk Council in 2014, in a by-election following the death of incumbent chief Stan Louttit.

Martin is running for mayor of Timmins in the 2026 municipal election.

== Musical career ==
At the Juno Awards of 1994, he became the first winner of the Juno Award for Best Music of Aboriginal Canada Recording for his album Wapistan Is Lawrence Martin. He was nominated two more times in the same category, at the Juno Awards of 1996 for his album Message and at the Juno Awards of 2003 for The Right Combination, an album he recorded as a duo with Vern Cheechoo.

Martin and Andrea Menard cohosted the Canadian Aboriginal Music Awards in 2006.

His song "I Got My Music" is featured on the 2014 compilation album Native North America, Vol. 1.

== Discography ==
- Wapistan Is Lawrence Martin (1993)
- Message (1995)
- The Right Combination (2002)
- Dancing for Life (2009)
- Train of Life (2014)
