= 2026 Prescott and Russell United Counties municipal elections =

Elections will be held in Prescott and Russell United Counties, Ontario on October 26, 2026 in conjunction with municipal elections across the province.

== Prescott and Russell United Counties Council ==
The Prescott and Russell United Counties Council consists of the mayors of the eight constituent municipalities:

Municipality	Mayor
Alfred and Plantagenet	Antoni Viau
Casselman	Paul Groulx
Champlain	Corina Parisien
Clarence-Rockland	Mario Zanth
East Hawkesbury	
Hawkesbury	
Russell	Mike Tarnowski (acclaimed)
The Nation	Francis Brière (acclaimed)

== Alfred and Plantagenet ==
Mayor Yves Laviolette is running for re-election. Deborah Hendrix has dropped out and endorsed Antoni Viau, but will still appear on the ballot.

List of candidates for mayor:

Mayoral Candidate	Vote	%
Antoni Viau	2,477	64%
Yves Laviolette (X)	1,202	31%
Deborah Hendrix	211	5%

== Casselman ==
Mayor Genevieve Lajoie is running for re-election. Running against her is councillor Paul Groulx.

List of candidates for mayor:

Mayoral Candidate	Vote	%
Paul Groulx	1,226	60%
François Richard	537	26%
Genevieve Lajoie (X)	292	14%

== Champlain ==
Mayor Normand Riopel is running for re-election. Running against him is owner of construction company RavCon, Serge Ravary.

List of candidates for mayor:

Mayoral Candidate	Vote	%
Corina Parisien	1,776	39%
Normand Riopel (X)	1,474	33%
Serge Ravary	1,253	28%

== Clarence-Rockland ==
List of candidates for mayor:

Mayoral Candidate	Vote	%
Mario Zanth (X)	5,868	65%
Laurier Lalonde	1,971	22%
Jay Woodruff	1,142	13%

== East Hawkesbury ==
Mayor Robert Kirby announced on August 31 that he had dropped out of the race, but will still appear on the ballot. Running to replace him is former deputy mayor Richard Sauvé.

List of candidates for mayor:

Mayoral Candidate	Vote	%
Robert Kirby (X)		
Daniel Journeaux		
Richard Sauvé		

== Hawkesbury ==
Running for mayor is former mayor and current councillor Jeanne Charlebois, former town councillor Gilles Roch Greffe, advisor Julie Séguin, senior manager Denis Pirollo, and realtor Johanna Raso.

List of candidates for mayor:

Mayoral Candidate	Vote	%
Johanna Raso		
Denis Pirollo		
Jeanne Charlebois		
Gilles Roch Greffe		
Julie Séguin		

== Russell ==
List of candidates for mayor:

Mayoral Candidate	Vote	%
Mike Tarnowski (X)	Acclaimed	

== The Nation ==
List of candidates for mayor:

Mayoral Candidate	Vote	%
Francis Brière (X)	Acclaimed	
