= 2026 Renfrew County municipal elections =

Ontario elections

Elections were held in Renfrew County, Ontario on October 26, 2026 in conjunction with municipal elections across the province.

== Renfrew County Council ==
County council has no direct elections; its membership is made up of the mayors and reeves of the lower-tier municipalities of the county (including the reeves - rather than mayors - of Deep River and Laurentian Valley), while Arnprior elects their deputy mayor for county council.

Position	Elected
Mayor of Admaston Bromley	Keith Gourley
Deputy Mayor of Arnprior	Dan Lynch (acclaimed)
Mayor of Bonnechere Valley	Jennifer Murphy (acclaimed)
Mayor of Brudenell, Lyndoch and Raglan	
Reeve of Deep River	Glenn Doncaster (acclaimed)
Mayor of Greater Madawaska	Bill Beacham
Mayor of Head, Clara and Maria	Karen Leclerc
Mayor of Horton	Daina Proctor
Mayor of Killaloe, Hagarty and Richards	Brian Pecoskie
Mayor of Laurentian Hills	Anne Giardini (acclaimed)
Reeve of Laurentian Valley	Keith Watt (acclaimed)
Mayor of Madawaska Valley	Mary Blank
Mayor of McNab/Braeside	Oliver Jacob
Mayor of North Algona Wilberforce	
Mayor of Petawawa	
Mayor of Renfrew	
Mayor of Whitewater Region	Neil Nicholson (acclaimed)

== Admaston/Bromley ==
=== Mayor ===
List of candidates:

Mayoral Candidate	Vote	%
Keith Gourley	715	58%
Brian Hamilton	325	26%
Kevin LeGris	199	16%

== Arnprior ==
Running against mayor Lisa McGee is Bill Griese, the president of Anrprior Glass-John's Glass and former campaign manager for MPP Billy Denault.

=== Mayor ===
Mayoral Candidate	Vote	%
Lisa McGee (X)	1,617	41%
Bill Griese	1,578	40%
Eric Burton	736	19%

=== Deputy mayor ===
Candidate	Vote	%
Dan Lynch (X)	Acclaimed	

== Bonnechere Valley ==
=== Mayor ===
Mayor Jennifer Murphy has been re-elected by acclamation.

List of candidates:

Mayoral Candidate	Vote	%
Jennifer Murphy (X)	Acclaimed	

== Brudenell, Lyndoch and Raglan ==
=== Mayor ===
List of candidates:

Mayoral Candidate	Vote	%
Kenneth Seafeld		
Kevin Quade		

== Deep River ==
List of candidates:

=== Mayor ===
Mayor Suzanne D'Eon was re-elected by acclamation.

Mayoral Candidate	Vote	%
Suzanne D'Eon (X)	Acclaimed	

=== Reeve ===
Reeve Candidate	Vote	%
Glenn Doncaster (X)	Acclaimed	

== Greater Madawaska ==
=== Mayor ===
List of candidates:

Mayoral Candidate	Vote	%
Bill Beacham	1,147	56%
Rob Weir (X)	914	44%

== Head, Clara and Maria ==
=== Mayor ===
List of candidates:

Mayoral Candidate	Vote	%
Karen Leclerc (X)	235	67%
Rachel Richer	118	33%

== Horton ==
=== Mayor ===
List of candidates:

Mayoral Candidate	Vote	%
Daina Proctor (X)	1,029	81%
Nicholas Klinck	249	19%

== Killaloe, Hagarty and Richards ==
=== Mayor ===
List of candidates:

Mayoral Candidate	Vote	%
Brian Pecoskie	1,502	76%
David Mayville (X)	471	24%

== Laurentian Hills ==
=== Mayor ===
Mayor Anne Giardini was re-elected by acclamation. No election will be held in the municipality, as all seats were elected by acclamation.

List of candidates:

Mayoral Candidate	Vote	%
Anne Giardini (X)	Acclaimed	

== Laurentian Valley ==
List of candidates:

=== Mayor ===
Mayor Steve Bennett was re-elected by acclamation.

Mayoral Candidate	Vote	%
Steve Bennett (X)	Acclaimed	

=== Reeve ===
Reeve Candidate	Vote	%
Keith Watt (X)	Acclaimed	

== Madawaska Valley ==
=== Mayor ===
Running for mayor are senior business executive Roger Prince and councillor Mary Blank.

List of candidates:

Mayoral Candidate	Vote	%
Mary Blank	1,612	56%
Roger Prince	1,242	44%

== McNab/Braeside ==
=== Mayor ===
Mayor Lori Hoddinott is running for re-election. She is being opposed by Olvier Jacob, in a re-match of the 2022 election.

List of candidates:

Mayoral Candidate	Vote	%
Oliver Jacob	1,716	49%
Lou Laventure	1,253	35%
Lori Hoddinott (X)	569	16%

== North Algona Wilberforce ==
=== Mayor ===
List of candidates:

Mayoral Candidate	Vote	%
Harold Weckworth		
Maria Robinson		

== Petawawa ==
=== Mayor ===
List of candidates:

Mayoral Candidate	Vote	%
Gary Serviss (X)		
Wayne Bando		

== Renfrew ==
List of candidates:

=== Mayor ===
Councillor Jason Legris is challenging mayor Tom Sidney.

Mayoral Candidate	Vote	%
Tom Sidney (X)		
Jason Legris		
Michael Coulas		
Callum Scott		
Peter Emon		
Josh Marquardt		

== Whitewater Region ==
=== Mayor ===
List of candidates:

Mayoral Candidate	Vote	%
Neil Nicholson (X)	Acclaimed	
