= 2026 Northumberland County municipal elections =

Municipal elections in Ontario, Canada

Elections will be held in Northumberland County, Ontario, on October 26, 2026, in conjunction with municipal elections across the province.

== Northumberland County Council ==
The Northumberland County Council consists of the seven mayors of its constituent municipalities.

Position	Elected
Mayor of Alnwick/Haldimand	Sherry Gibson
Mayor of Brighton	Brian Ostrander
Mayor of Cobourg	Lucas Cleveland
Mayor of Cramahe	Sandra Arthur
Mayor of Hamilton	Scott Jibb (acclaimed)
Mayor of Port Hope	Todd Attridge
Mayor of Trent Hills	

== Alnwick/Haldimand ==
Mayor John Logel is not running for re-election.

List of candidates:

Mayoral Candidate	Vote	%
Sherry Gibson	2,138	74%
Mike Ainsworth	762	26%

== Brighton ==
Mayor Brian Ostrander is running for re-election. Running against him is project manager Christina Bergmann and councillor Bobbi Wright.

List of candidates:

Mayoral Candidate	Vote	%
Brian Ostrander (X)	2,609	53%
Bobbi Wright	1,689	34%
Christina Bergmann	667	13%

== Cobourg ==
List of candidates:

Mayor Lucas Cleveland is running for re-election. He will be challenged by deputy mayor Nicole Beatty, and home builder Max LeLarchant.

Mayoral Candidate	Vote	%
Lucas Cleveland (X)	4,524	46%
Nicole Beatty	3,850	39%
Max LeMarchant	1,432	15%

== Cramahe ==
Mayor Mandy Martin is not running for re-election. Running to replace her includes Deputy Mayor Sandra Arthur.

List of candidates:

Mayoral Candidate	Vote	%
Sandra Arthur	1,445	68%
Bob Culetta	391	18%
Kevin McGourty	298	14%

== Hamilton ==
Mayor Scott Jibb was re-elected by acclamation.

List of candidates:

Mayoral Candidate	Vote	%
Scott Jibb (X)	Acclaimed	

== Port Hope ==
Mayor Olena Hankivsky registered to run for re-election at the last minute. She is being opposed by councillor Todd Attridge, and former candidate Angela Grogan.

List of candidates:

Mayoral Candidate	Vote	%
Todd Attridge	3,593	52%
Olena Hankivsky (X)	2,132	31%
Ian West	595	9%
Angela Grogan	543	8%
David Stambrook	95	1%

== Trent Hills ==
List of candidates:

Mayoral Candidate	Vote	%
Michael Metcalf		
Steven Haylestrom		
