= 2026 Grey County municipal elections =

In Ontario, Canada

Elections will be held in Grey County, Ontario on October 26, 2026, in conjunction with municipal elections across the province.

== Grey County Council ==
The Grey County Council consists of the mayors and deputy mayors of each of the constituent communities.

Position	Elected
Chatsworth Mayor	
Chatsworth Deputy Mayor	
Georgian Bluffs Mayor	Sue Carleton (acclaimed)
Georgian Bluffs Deputy Mayor	Grant Pringle (acclaimed)
Grey Highlands Mayor	Paul McQueen
Grey Highlands Deputy Mayor	Joel Loughead
Hanover Mayor	Warren Dickert
Hanover Deputy Mayor	Selwyn Hicks
Meaford Mayor	Shirley Keaveney
Meaford Deputy Mayor	Robert Uhrig (acclaimed)
Owen Sound Mayor	Richard Thomas
Owen Sound Deputy Mayor	Scott Greig (acclaimed)
Southgate Mayor	
Southgate Deputy Mayor	Barbara Dobreen (acclaimed)
The Blue Mountains Mayor	Marni Moreau
The Blue Mountains Deputy Mayor	Rachel Gilliland
West Grey Mayor	Kevin Eccles (acclaimed)
West Grey Deputy Mayor	Rebecca Hergert

== The Blue Mountains ==
List of candidates:

=== Mayor ===
Mayor Andrea Matrosovs did not run for re-election. Running to replace her were past president of the Blue Mountains Historical Society Paul Reale, deputy mayor Peter Bordignon, and co-founder of the Blue Mountain Film + Media Festival, and daughter of former councillor Peter Moreau, Marni Moreau.

Mayoral Candidate	Vote	%
Marni Moreau	2,469	41.07
Paul Reale	2,384	39.65
Peter Bordignon	1,159	19.28

=== Deputy mayor ===
Deputy mayoral candidate	Vote	%
Rachel Gilliland	2,476	42.38
Gail Ardiel	2,026	34.68
Bob Welling	1,234	21.12
Daniel Murphy	106	1.81

== Chatsworth ==
List of candidates:

=== Mayor ===
Mayor Scott Mackey did not run for re-election. Running to replace him were deputy mayor Terry McKay and councillor Shawn Greig.

Mayoral Candidate	Vote	%
Shawn Greig	1,586	64.26
Terry McKay	882	35.74

=== Deputy mayor ===
Deputy mayoral candidate	Vote	%
Diana Rae	1,253	52.06
Peter Whitten	1,154	47.94

== Georgian Bluffs ==
List of candidates:

=== Mayor ===
Mayor Sue Carleton was re-elected by acclamation.

Mayoral Candidate	Vote	%
Sue Carleton (X)	Acclaimed	

=== Deputy mayor ===
Deputy mayoral candidate	Vote	%
Grant Pringle (X)	Acclaimed	

== Grey Highlands ==
List of candidates:

=== Mayor ===
Mayor Paul McQueen is running for re-election. He is being challenged by deputy mayor Dane Nielsen, and local resident Mark Brown.

Mayoral Candidate	Vote	%
Paul McQueen (X)	1,765	44%
Dane Nielsen	1,286	32%
Mark Brown	919	23%

=== Deputy mayor ===
Deputy mayoral candidate	Vote	%
Joel Loughead	2,174	
Tom Allwood	1,283	
Andrea Edwards	379	

== Hanover ==
List of candidates:

=== Mayor ===
Mayor Sue Paterson is running for re-election. She is being challenged by Deputy mayor Warren Dickert.

Mayoral Candidate	Vote	%
Warren Dickert	1,362	53%
Sue Paterson (X)	1,206	47%

=== Deputy mayor ===
Deputy mayoral candidate	Vote	%
Selwyn Hicks	1,482	
Richard Emrich	740	
Rosalva Clubine	254	

== Meaford ==
List of candidates:

=== Mayor ===
Running for mayor is deputy mayor Shirley Keaveney.

Mayoral Candidate	Vote	%
Shirley Keaveney	2,627	52%
Justin Perks	2,342	46%
Caryn Colman	115	2%

=== Deputy mayor ===
Deputy mayoral candidate	Vote	%
Robert Uhrig	Acclaimed	

== Owen Sound ==
List of candidates:

=== Mayor ===
Mayor Ian Boddy announced he was not running for re-election.

Running for mayor so far includes town councillor Carol Merton and former councillor Richard Thomas.

Mayoral Candidate	Vote	%
Richard Thomas	3,522	50%
Carol Merton	2,763	39%
Andrii Zvorygin	421	6%
Mike Seiler	142	2%
Jodi King	138	2%
Ray Botten	76	1%

=== Deputy mayor ===
Deputy mayoral candidate	Vote	%
Scott Greig (X)	Acclaimed	

== Southgate ==
List of candidates:

=== Mayor ===
Mayor Brian Milne is being challenged by councillor Jason Rice.

Mayoral Candidate	Vote	%
Brian Milne (X)		
Jason Rice		

=== Deputy mayor ===
Deputy mayoral candidate	Vote	%
Barbara Dobreen (X)	Acclaimed	

== West Grey ==
List of candidates:

=== Mayor ===
Mayoral Candidate	Vote	%
Kevin Eccles (X)	Acclaimed	

=== Deputy mayor ===
Deputy mayoral candidate	Vote	%
Rebecca Hergert	1,886	
Thomas Hutchinson (X)	1,618	
