= Breach of Trust (band) =

Canadian metal band

- Origin: La Ronge, Saskatchewan
- Genres: Alternative rock, hard rock
- Years active: 1994–2012
- Members: Marty Ballentyne; William Aubut; Zane Kryzanowsky; Darryl Lavallee; Colin Cheechoo; Donovan Bruyere; Brent Stutsky; Dean Zabolotney; Terry Aubut

Breach of Trust is a Canadian hard rock band originally from La Ronge, Saskatchewan. The band's principal songwriters, Marty Ballentyne and Zane Kryzanowsky, are both of indigenous heritage.

== History ==
The band was formed in 1994 by vocalist/guitarist Marty Ballentyne, drummer William Aubut, bassist Zane Kryzanowsky, and guitarist Darryl Lavallee. In 1995, they independently released a 5-song EP called Dead Issue EP. In 1997, Lavallee left the band and was replaced by Colin Cheechoo, the son of country singer-songwriter Vern Cheechoo.

In 2000, Breach of Trust released their debut album, Songs for Dying Nations, in 2000. Shows across Canada that summer, a music video for the song "Who Am I?", and rave reviews from online sites helped to create a buzz around the band, and major labels began attending shows. In 2001 Breach of Trust signed with EMI and "Songs For Dying Nations" was re-released that year. The band won three awards at the 2002 Indigenous Music Awards (then-named the Canadian Aboriginal Music Awards). Breach of Trust won Best Songwriter, Best Group or Duo and Best Rock Album.

While radio never embraced the group, MuchMusic, particularly the shows Going Coastal, The New Music and Loud, were big supporters of the band, and Breach of Trust performed live in the Much studios on two occasions.

In 2001, the band toured with Amen, Flybanger, Finger Eleven, Slurpymundae, and Headstrong. They played the 3rd stage at Edgefest in Barrie, Ontario on July 1, 2001, alongside Billy Talent and The Dears.

In 2002, Kryzanowsky left the band. Cheechoo left to join a band called Cessate. The band recruited bassist Brent Stutsky and guitarist Dean Zabolotney in 2003, and recorded a new album in the summer. The album was held back from release until 2004 at the request of the band, who were unhappy with some of the mixes. The album Breach of Trust was released in November 2004. The band did shows with The Tea Party and the single "Bad Trip," received some airplay on MuchMusic.

Aubut, Stutsky and Zabolotney left the band and it became inactive until early 2007, when Ballentyne, Cheechoo and singer/guitarist Donovan Bruyere performed at the 2007 National Aboriginal Achievement Awards in Edmonton, and at various other shows until the end of 2009. In 2011, Bruyere left the band; guitarist Terry Aubut joined in 2012 but the band broke up soon after.

In 2019, Cheechoo and William Aubut announced that they had joined the band Side Step the Crow. Ballantyne moved to Ottawa and formed the band The Uglies.

In May 2022, the band's Facebook page changed its name to "The Illusion of Certainty," and Ballentyne announced upcoming shows featuring any former Breach of Trust member that wished to participate. On June 8, the band's first single in eighteen years, "Settle for Nothing," was released via SoundCloud and later on Spotify. The single is the first from the band's upcoming third album titled The Illusion of Certainty, which was due to be released in the winter of 2023.

== Discography ==
- Dead Issue EP (1995), Rockin' Rod Records
- Songs for Dying Nations (2000), Independent
- Songs for Dying Nations (2001), EMI re-release
- Breach of Trust (2004), EMI
- The Illusion of Certainty (2023)
- Fubar: The Album, "Eyes of A Stranger" (Payolas cover) (2003), EMI
