= Vern Cheechoo =

Vern Cheechoo is a Cree folk and country singer-songwriter from Canada. He is most noted as a two-time Juno Award nominee for Best Aboriginal Recording, receiving nods at the Juno Awards of 2000 for his solo album Touch the Earth and Sky, and at the Juno Awards of 2003 for The Right Combination, an album recorded as a duo with Lawrence Martin.

Originally from Moose Factory, Ontario, he is the son of Sinclair Cheechoo, an influential Cree fiddle player. His siblings, Archie Cheechoo and Thelma Cheechoo, were also musicians.

He released his debut album Lonesome & Hurting in 1993. He supported the album with several concert dates as an opening act for Bruce Cockburn. The album's title track was featured in an episode of Northern Exposure, he was featured in a 1993 episode of the CBC Television music performance series Ear to the Ground, and he appeared in the 1996 film Dance Me Outside performing songs from the album in concert.

Touch the Earth and Sky, his second album, was released in 1999. In addition to his Juno Award nomination, Cheechoo and John Switzer won the Canadian Aboriginal Music Award for Best Producer/Engineer for their work on the album, and they also performed a song at the ceremony.

Although Cheechoo and Martin were lifelong friends and frequent collaborators, who were in a high school band called Veil's Universe, the 2003 album The Right Combination represented their first time directly releasing an album as a duo. In addition to the Juno nomination, the album was nominated for Best Group or Duo and Best Country Album at the 2003 Aboriginal Music Awards.

He has continued to perform, most notably at a 2016 mining conference in Timmins where he performed an unannounced reunion show with Martin, but has not released another album since The Right Combination. He has been employed for a number of years as director of lands and resources for the Mushkegowuk Council. In 2021 he announced plans to record and release his fourth album, which would be dedicated to the memory of his late wife Karen, although no further news about the release of the album has been announced as of January 2023.

His son Colin Cheechoo is a musician, who was formerly associated with the band Breach of Trust.

== Discography ==
- Lonesome & Hurting - 1993
- Touch the Earth and Sky - 1999
- The Right Combination - 2002
