= Odeyak =

Canoe-kayak hybrid from Quebec, Canada

The Odeyak is a canoe-kayak hybrid, designed and built by Billie Weetaltuk in 1990. The word "odeyak" is a portmanteau of the words "ode," a Cree word for "canoe," and "kayak," an Inuktitut word. In the spring of 1990, a group of Inuit and Cree paddled the Odeyak from Whapmagoostui, Quebec, to New York City, arriving on April 22 to protest the proposed Great Whale Hydroelectric Project at the Earth Day 1990 celebration. Matthew Coon Come, then the grand chief and chairman of Quebec's Grand Council of the Crees, spoke at the event on behalf of the Cree and Inuit of the James Bay region.

The neighbouring communities of Whapmagoostui and Kuujjuarapik, which are Cree and Inuit communities, respectively, are located on the mouth of the Great Whale River. The Odeyak's hybrid construction represented the cooperation of the two neighbouring communities of people in opposition of Hydro-Québec's development. At 8 m (26 ft) long, it is substantially larger than either a standard canoe or kayak, but was designed to accommodate a large crew and for increased visibility.

Currently, the Odeyak is housed at the Aanischaaukamikw Cree Cultural Institute in Oujé-Bougoumou, Quebec, having been transferred from the Canadian Canoe Museum in 2011.
