= Morley Loon =

Canadian musician

Morley Loon (1948–1986) was a Canadian First Nations musician, from Mistissini, Quebec. Loon played in several groups, including Red Cedar and Kashtin, but was mostly known for his solo work. He mostly wrote and performed in the Cree language, and was a prominent activist for First Nations issues.

== Career ==
Loon was born 1948, in the village of Mistissini in what was then Baie-James, now Eeyou Istchee, in northern Quebec, to Cree parents. He began singing and touring in the late 1960s, composing in Cree. In the 1970s, Loon was an active part of the Canadian First Nations political movement. Loon was part of the cast of Cold Journey, a National Film Board drama filmed in 1971, and participated in protests over the sale of First Nation artifacts at a Montreal auction. He recorded two albums with the Canadian Broadcasting Corporation's Northern Service in 1975, as well as a studio album, North Land, My Land, with Boot Records in 1981. A cassingle, North Country, was released independently in 1984.

Morley Loon was the first performer in the Cree language to see significant radio airplay in Canada. Loon influenced other First Nations musicians, such as Lloyd Cheechoo and Kashtin, to sing in their own languages. Cheechoo played backing guitar and toured with Loon in the late 1970s. With Inuk musician Willie Thrasher, Loon formed Red Cedar, based out of Vancouver, British Columbia. The group played at the Black Hills Survival Gathering in South Dakota's Black Hills in 1980. In 1986, Loon died at age 38 after suffering a lengthy illness.

His song "N'Doheeno" is featured on the 2014 compilation album Native North America, Vol. 1.

== Discography ==
- Songs in Cree Composed and Sung by Morley Loon, 1975, Canadian Broadcasting Corporation Northern Service
- Cree Songs, 1975, Canadian Broadcasting Corporation Northern Service
- North Land, My Land/Cette terre du Nord qui est mienne, 1981, Boot Records
- North Country, 1984, independently released
