= Frank Sinatra: The Reprise Years =

The Reprise Years

Box set by Frank Sinatra
- Released: November 29, 2010
- Recorded: 1960–1984
- Genres: Vocal jazz; traditional pop
- Length: 1315:24
- Label: Universal Music Group

Frank Sinatra chronology
| Sinatra/Jobim: The Complete Reprise Recordings (2010) | The Reprise Years (2010) | Best of Vegas (2011) |

Frank Sinatra: The Reprise Years is a 36 disc boxed set by American singer Frank Sinatra.

This set contains 35 CDs featuring every studio album that Sinatra released between 1960 and 1984. Each CD contains an individual Sinatra Reprise LP (including singles compilations and a bonus DVD). Missing from the set are 1966's Greatest Hits! and 1972's Greatest Hits, Vol.2, which contain songs not available on any other album. Also not included are any single-only releases from the 1970s and 1980s which are not available on any studio album. The Complete Reprise Studio Recordings contains all of the missing songs from this collection.

== Track listing ==
- Disc one - Ring-a-Ding-Ding! (1961)
- Disc two - Swing Along with Me (1961)
- Disc three - I Remember Tommy (1961)
- Disc four - Sinatra and Strings (1961)
- Disc five - Sinatra and Swingin' Brass (1962)
- Disc six - Sinatra Sings Great Songs from Great Britain (1962)
- Disc seven - All Alone (1962)
- Disc eight - Sinatra-Basie: An Historic Musical First (1962)
- Disc nine - The Concert Sinatra (1963)
- Disc ten - Sinatra's Sinatra (1963)
- Disc eleven - Sinatra Sings Days of Wine and Roses, Moon River, and Other Academy Award Winners (1964)
- Disc twelve - America, I Hear You Singing (1964)
- Disc thirteen - It Might as Well Be Swing (1964)
- Disc fourteen - Softly, as I Leave You (1964)
- Disc fifteen - Sinatra '65: The Singer Today (1965)
- Disc sixteen - September of My Years (1965)
- Disc seventeen - My Kind of Broadway (1965)
- Disc eighteen - A Man and His Music (1965)
- Disc nineteen - Strangers in the Night (1966)
- Disc twenty - Moonlight Sinatra (1966)
- Disc twenty-one - That's Life (1966)
- Disc twenty-two - Francis Albert Sinatra & Antonio Carlos Jobim (1967)
- Disc twenty-three - The World We Knew (1967)
- Disc twenty-four - Francis A. & Edward K. (1968)
- Disc twenty-five - The Sinatra Family Wish You a Merry Christmas (1968)
- Disc twenty-six - Cycles (1968)
- Disc twenty-seven - My Way (1969)
- Disc twenty-eight - A Man Alone (1969)
- Disc twenty-nine - Watertown (1970)
- Disc thirty - Sinatra & Company (1971)
- Disc thirty-one - Ol' Blue Eyes Is Back (1973)
- Disc thirty-two - Some Nice Things I've Missed (1974)
- Disc thirty-three - Trilogy: Past Present Future (CD 1) (1980)
- Disc thirty-four - Trilogy: Past Present Future (CD 2) (1980)
- Disc thirty-five - She Shot Me Down (1981)
- Disc thirty-six - L.A. Is My Lady (1984)
- Disc thirty-seven - A Man and His Music - Trilogy (DVD)
  - A Man and His Music (1965)
  - A Man and His Music Part II (1966)
  - A Man and His Music + Ella + Jobim (1967)

== Personnel ==
- Frank Sinatra - vocals
- Nancy Sinatra
- Frank Sinatra Jr.
- Tina Sinatra
- Dean Martin
- Sammy Davis Jr.
- Bing Crosby
- Antonio Carlos Jobim - vocals, guitar
- Count Basie and his Orchestra
