= Sinatra: Best of the Best =

Compilation album by Frank Sinatra
- Released: November 15, 2011
- Recorded: April 30, 1953 – September 19, 1979
- Genres: Vocal jazz, big band
- Length: 128:46
- Label: Capitol/Reprise

Frank Sinatra chronology
Sinatra/Basie: The Complete Reprise Studio Recordings (2011)	Sinatra: Best of the Best (2011)	Duets: 20th Anniversary Deluxe Edition (2013)

Sinatra: Best of the Best is a 2011 double compilation album by American singer Frank Sinatra.

The album was promoted as having his classic hits from Capitol Records and Reprise Records together on one record for the first time ever. This 2-disc set is packaged in a lift top box and contains 5 collectible postcards of classic Sinatra images. The first disc contains the biggest hits from Frank Sinatra's career; the second disc contains the long out-of-print Live In '57 performance recorded in Seattle, Washington. Though this album was compiled and released by Capitol Records, the song "Night and Day" presented here is not the Capitol version, but the 1962 Reprise version from the album Sinatra and Strings.

Best of the Best is also available as a single disc with just the hits from disc one.

== Track listing ==
=== Disc one ===
1. "I've Got the World on a String" (Harold Arlen, Ted Koehler)--arranged by Nelson Riddle (from the Capitol Records album This Is Sinatra!) - 2:14
2. "My Funny Valentine" (Richard Rodgers, Lorenz Hart)--arranged by Riddle (from the Capitol Records album Songs For Young Lovers) - 2:31
3. "Young at Heart" (Carolyn Leigh, Johnny Richards)--arranged by Riddle (from the Capitol Records album This Is Sinatra!) - 2:53
4. "In the Wee Small Hours of the Morning" (Bob Hilliard, David Mann)--arranged by Riddle (from the Capitol Records album In the Wee Small Hours) - 3:00
5. "Love and Marriage" (Sammy Cahn, Jimmy Van Heusen)--arranged by Riddle (from the Capitol Records album This Is Sinatra!) - 2:41
6. "You Make Me Feel So Young" (Josef Myrow, Mack Gordon)--arranged by Riddle (from the Capitol Records album Songs for Swingin' Lovers!) - 2:57
7. "I've Got You Under My Skin" (Cole Porter)--arranged by Riddle (from the Capitol Records album Songs for Swingin' Lovers!) - 3:43
8. "The Lady Is a Tramp" (Rodgers, Hart)--arranged by Riddle (from the Capitol Records Soundtrack Pal Joey) - 3:14
9. "Witchcraft" (Cy Coleman, Leigh)--arranged by Riddle (from the Capitol Records album All the Way) - 2:54
10. "All the Way" (Cahn, Van Heusen)--arranged by Riddle (from the Capitol Records album All The Way) - 2:55
11. "Come Fly with Me" (Cahn, Van Heusen)--arranged by Billy May (from the Capitol Records album Come Fly with Me) - 3:19
12. "Angel Eyes" (Matt Dennis, Earl Brent)--arranged by Riddle (from the Capitol Records album Frank Sinatra Sings for Only the Lonely) - 3:46
13. "Nice 'n' Easy" (Alan and Marilyn Bergman, Lew Spence)--arranged by Riddle (from the Capitol Records album Nice 'n' Easy) - 2:45
14. "Night and Day" (Porter)--arranged by Don Costa (from the Reprise Records album Sinatra and Strings) - 3:47
15. "The Way You Look Tonight" (Jerome Kern, Dorothy Fields)--arranged by Riddle (from the Reprise Records album Sinatra Sings Days of Wine and Roses, Moon River, and Other Academy Award Winners) - 3:22
16. "My Kind of Town" (Cahn, Van Heusen)--arranged by Riddle (from the Reprise Records soundtrack Robin and the 7 Hoods) - 3:08
17. "Fly Me to the Moon (In Other Words)" (Bart Howard)--arranged by Quincy Jones (from the Reprise Records album It Might As Well Be Swing) - 2:49
18. "It Was a Very Good Year" (Ervin Drake)--arranged by Gordon Jenkins (from the Reprise Records album September of My Years) - 4:27
19. "Strangers in the Night" (Bert Kaempfert, Charles Singleton, Eddie Snyder)--arranged by Ernie Freeman (from the Reprise Records album Strangers in the Night) - 2:25
20. "Summer Wind" (Heinz Meyer, Hans Bradtke, Johnny Mercer)--arranged by Riddle (from the Reprise Records album Strangers in the Night) - 2:53
21. "That's Life" (Kelly Gordon, Dean Kay)--arranged by Freeman (from the Reprise Records album That's Life) - 3:10
22. "My Way" (Paul Anka, Claude Francois, Jacques Revaux, Gilles Thibaut)--arranged by Costa (from the Reprise Records album My Way)- 4:36
23. "Theme from New York, New York" (Fred Ebb, John Kander)--arranged by Costa (from the Reprise Records album Trilogy: Past Present Future) - 3:26

=== Disc two ===
1. Introduction - "You Make Me Feel So Young" - 3:46
2. "It Happened in Monterey" (Billy Rose, Mabel Wayne) - 2:23
3. "At Long Last Love" (Porter) - 2:15
4. "I Get a Kick Out of You" (Porter) - 2:49
5. "Just One of Those Things" (Porter) - 3:02
6. "A Foggy Day" (George Gershwin, Ira Gershwin) - 3:31
7. "The Lady is a Tramp" - 3:18
8. "They Can't Take That Away from Me" (G. Gershwin, I. Gershwin) - 1:40
9. "I Won't Dance" (Fields, Oscar Hammerstein II, Otto Harbach, Jimmy McHugh) - 3:26
10. Sinatra Dialogue - 4:52
11. "When Your Lover Has Gone" (Enir A. Swan) - 2:53
12. "Violets for Your Furs" (Tom Adair, Dennis) - 3:34
13. "My Funny Valentine" - 2:44
14. "Glad to Be Unhappy" (Rodgers, Hart) - 1:37
15. "One for My Baby (and One More for the Road)" (Arlen, Mercer) - 4:01
16. "(Love Is) The Tender Trap" (Cahn, Van Heusen) - 4:12
17. "Hey! Jealous Lover" (Sammy Cahn, Kay Twomey, Bee Walker) - 2:21
18. "I've Got You Under My Skin" - 3:15
19. "Oh! Look at Me Now" (Joe Bushkin, John DeVries) - 3:12

== Charts ==
=== Weekly charts ===
Chart (2011–2014)	Peak position
Australian Albums (ARIA)	36
Austrian Albums (Ö3 Austria)	70
Belgian Albums (Ultratop Flanders)	24
Belgian Heatseekers (Ultratop Flanders)	2
Belgian Albums (Ultratop Wallonia)	49
Belgian Heatseekers (Ultratop Wallonia)	4
Belgian Mid-price Albums (Ultratop Wallonia)	30
Dutch Albums (Album Top 100)	54
Irish Albums (IRMA)	19
Mexican Albums (Top 100 Mexico)	80
Scottish Albums (Official Charts)	27
Spanish Albums (Promusicae)	12
Swiss Albums (Schweizer Hitparade)	88
UK Albums (Official Charts)	30
US Billboard 200	23
US Top Jazz Albums (Billboard)	1

=== Year-end charts ===
Chart (2012)	Position
Spanish Albums (PROMUSICAE)	49
US Billboard 200	176
US Top Jazz Albums (Billboard)	4
Chart (2013)	Position
US Top Jazz Albums (Billboard)	4

== Certifications ==
Region	Certification	Certified units/sales
Ireland (IRMA)	Gold	7,500^{^}
United Kingdom (BPI)	Gold	100,000^{^}
United States (RIAA)	3× Platinum	3,000,000^{^}
^{^} Shipments figures based on certification alone.
