= Al Viola =

American jazz guitarist (1919–2007)

Alfred Viola
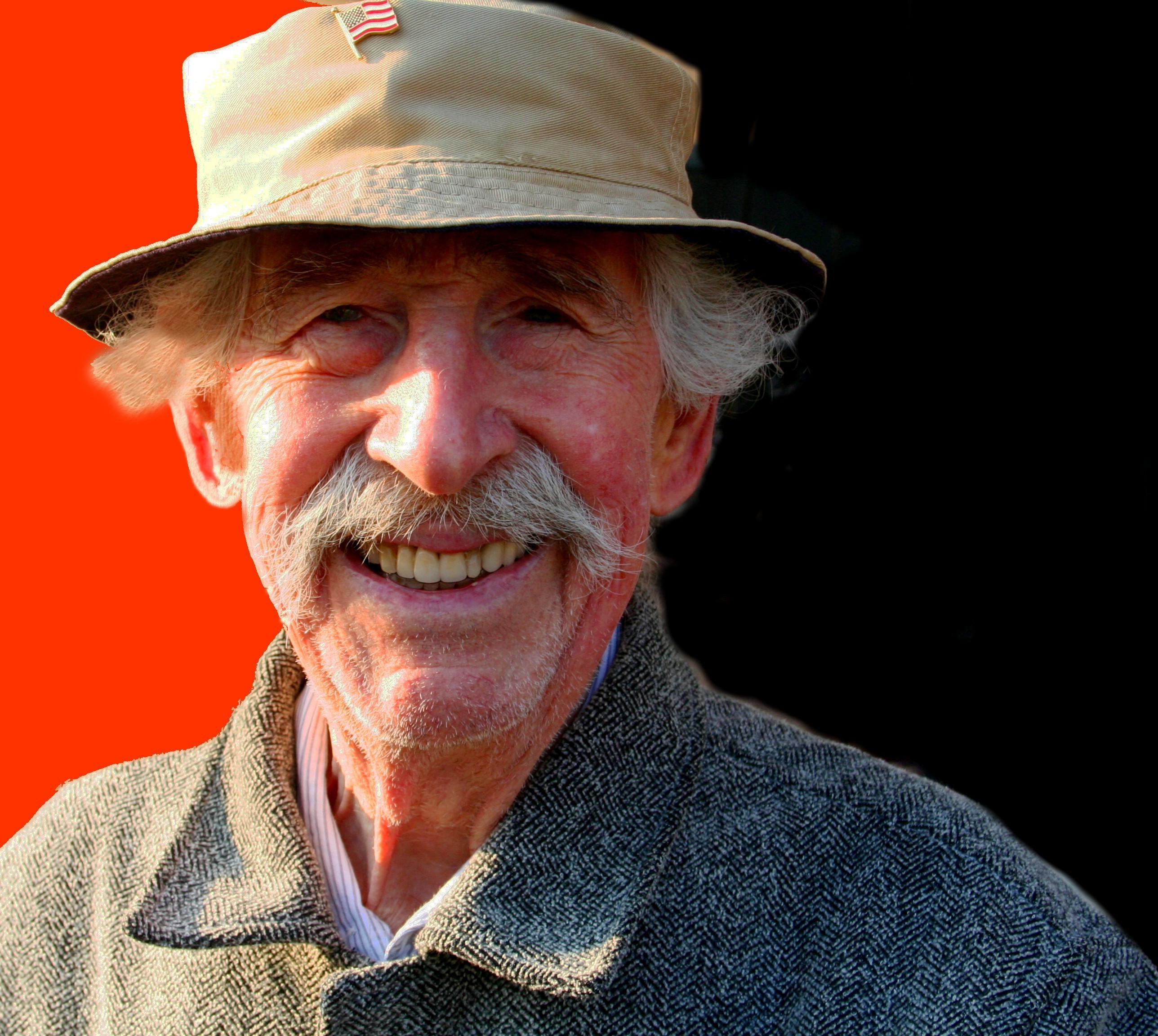
- Viola in January 2007

Background information
- Born: Alfred Viola; June 16, 1919; Brooklyn, New York, U.S.
- Died: February 21, 2007 (aged 87) Los Angeles, California
- Genres: Jazz
- Occupation: Musician
- Instruments: Guitar, mandolin
- Years active: 1940s–1980s

Alfred Viola (June 16, 1919 – February 21, 2007) was an American jazz guitarist who worked with Frank Sinatra for 25 years. He played the mandolin on the soundtrack of the film The Godfather.

== Biography ==
Viola grew up in an Italian family in Brooklyn and learned to play the guitar and mandolin as a teenager. He enlisted in the Army during World War II and played in an Army jazz band from 1942 to 1945. He started a trio with Page Cavanaugh and bassist Lloyd Pratt. The band appeared in several films, including Romance on the High Seas with Doris Day, and played a few dates in 1946 and 1947 with Frank Sinatra. Viola continued to work with Sinatra regularly, accompanying him on several hundred studio recordings and concert dates between 1956 and 1980.

Viola was a session musician in Los Angeles, performing in films and television. His mandolin playing can be heard on the soundtrack of The Godfather. Other credits include West Side Story and Who's Afraid of Virginia Woolf? He continued playing jazz as well, with Bobby Troup, Ray Anthony, Harry James, Buddy Collette, Stan Kenton, Gerald Wilson and Terry Gibbs.

He worked as a session musician on over 500 albums, including releases by Natalie Cole, Neil Diamond, Marvin Gaye, Julie London, Steve Lawrence, Linda Ronstadt, Jimmy Witherspoon, Helen Humes, June Christy, Ella Fitzgerald, Anita O'Day, Nelson Riddle, and Joe Williams.

Viola and Cavanaugh reunited in the 1980s with Phil Mallory and continued to play regularly in Los Angeles until the late 1990s.

== Death ==
Viola died of cancer in 2007 at the age of 87.

== Discography ==
=== As leader ===
- Solo Guitar (Mode, 1957)
- Guitars (Liberty, 1959)
- Guitars Vol. 2 (Liberty, 1959)
- Imagination (Liberty, 1960)
- Guitar Lament (World Pacific, 1961)
- Alone Again (Legend, 1973)
- Salutations F.S. (PBR, 1977)
- Prelude to a Kiss (PBR, 1980)
- Mello as a Cello (Starline, 1994)
- Stringin' the Blues with Howard Alden, Bucky Pizzarelli, Frank Vignola (Jazzology, 2003)

=== As sideman ===
- Steve Allen, Terry Gibbs, Captain (Mercury, 1958)
- Laurindo Almeida, Viva Bossa Nova! (Capitol, 1962)
- Laurindo Almeida, Acapulco '22 (Capitol, 1963)
- The Beach Boys, The Beach Boys' Christmas Album (Capitol, 1964)
- Hadda Brooks, Anytime, Anyplace, Anywhere (DRG, 1994)
- Hadda Brooks, Time Was When (Pointblank, 1996)
- Roy Burns, Big, Bad & Beautiful (FPM, 1973)
- Red Callender, Basin Street Brass (Legend, 1973)
- June Christy, Do-Re-Mi (Capitol, 1961)
- June Christy, The Intimate Miss Christy (Capitol, 1963)
- Natalie Cole, Unforgettable... with Love (Elektra, 1991)
- Buddy Collette, Buddy's Best (Dooto, 1958)
- Buddy Collette, Polynesia (Music & Sound, 1959)
- Tommy Dorsey, The Dorsey/Sinatra Sessions 1940–1942 (RCA Victor, 1972)
- Michael Feinstein, Pure Imagination (Elektra, 1992)
- Bob Florence, Bongos/Reeds/Brass (HiFi, 1960)
- Ella Fitzgerald, Ella Fitzgerald (Verve, 1987)
- The Four Freshmen, The Four Freshmen and Five Guitars (Capitol, 1959)
- The Four Freshmen, First Affair (Capitol, 1960)
- Tommy Garrett, 50 Guitars Go South of the Border (Liberty, 1961)
- Earl Grant, The End (Decca, 1958)
- Dick Grove, Little Bird Suite (Pacific Jazz, 1963)
- Al Hibbler, Sings the Blues: Monday Every Day (Reprise, 1961)
- Lena Horne, Stormy Weather (RCA Victor, 1957)
- Helen Humes, Helen Humes (Contemporary, 1960)
- Helen Humes, Swingin' with Humes (Contemporary, 1961)
- Calvin Jackson, Jazz Variations On Gershwin's Rhapsody in Blue (Liberty, 1957)
- Harry James, Harry James and His New Swingin' Band (MGM, 1959)
- Harry James, Harry James Twenty-fifth Anniversary Album (MGM, 1964)
- Peggy Lee, Big $pender (Capitol, 1966)
- Julie London, Lonely Girl (Liberty, 1956)
- Julie London, Julie...at Home (Liberty, 1960)
- Shelly Manne, My Son the Jazz Drummer! (Contemporary, 1963)
- Dean Martin, Sleep Warm (Capitol, 1959)
- Anita O'Day, Trav'lin' Light (Verve, 1961)
- Frankie Ortega, The Piano Styling of Frankie Ortega (Imperial, 1956)
- Frankie Ortega, Keyboard Caravan (Imperial, 1959)
- André Previn, Previn at the Piano (RCA Victor, 1947)
- André Previn, Skylark (RCA Victor, 1955)
- Terry Reid, Seed of Memory (ABC, 1976)
- Rudy Render, If You Knew Rudy (Page, 1957)
- Googie Rene, Romesville! (Class, 1959)
- Pete Rugolo, The Music from Richard Diamond (EmArcy, 1959)
- Pete Rugolo, Ten Trumpets and 2 Guitars (Mercury, 1961)
- Warren Schatz, Warren Schatz (Columbia, 1971)
- Frank Sinatra, Frank Sinatra Sings for Only the Lonely (Capitol, 1958)
- Frank Sinatra, No One Cares (Capitol, 1959)
- Frank Sinatra, Nice 'n' Easy (Capitol, 1960)
- Frank Sinatra, Sinatra's Swingin' Session!!! (Capitol, 1961)
- Frank Sinatra, Ring-a-Ding-Ding! (Reprise, 1961)
- Frank Sinatra, Come Swing with Me! (Capitol, 1961)
- Frank Sinatra, Swing Along With Me (Reprise, 1961)
- Frank Sinatra, I Remember Tommy (Reprise, 1961)
- Frank Sinatra, Sinatra and Swingin' Brass (Reprise, 1962)
- Frank Sinatra, Sinatra and Strings (Reprise, 1962)
- Frank Sinatra, The Concert Sinatra (Reprise, 1963)
- Frank Sinatra, Sinatra Sings Days of Wine and Roses, Moon River, and Other Academy Award Winners (Reprise, 1964)
- Frank Sinatra, Moonlight Sinatra (Reprise, 1966)
- Frank Sinatra, Strangers in the Night (Reprise, 1966)
- Frank Sinatra, Francis Albert Sinatra & Antônio Carlos Jobim (Reprise, 1967)
- Frank Sinatra, The World We Knew (Reprise, 1967)
- Frank Sinatra, Cycles (Reprise, 1968)
- Frank Sinatra, My Way (Reprise, 1969)
- Frank Sinatra, A Man Alone (Reprise, 1969)
- Frank Sinatra, Watertown (Reprise, 1970)
- Frank Sinatra, Sinatra & Company (Reprise, 1971)
- Frank Sinatra, Some Nice Things I've Missed (Reprise, 1974)
- Frank Sinatra, Trilogy: Past Present Future (Reprise, 1980)
- Joanie Sommers, Softly the Brazilian Sound (Warner Bros., 1964)
- The Strollers, Swinging Flute in Hi-Fi (Score, 1958)
- The Sugar Shoppe, The Sugar Shoppe (Now Sounds, 1968)
- The Manhattan Transfer, Mecca for Moderns (Atlantic, 1981)
- Bobby Troup, Do Re Mi (Liberty, 1957)
- Joe Williams, With Love (Temponic, 1972)
- Jimmy Witherspoon, Spoon (Reprise, 1961)
- Weird Al Yankovic, Dare to Be Stupid (Rock 'n' Roll 1985)
- Weird Al Yankovic, This Is the Life (Rock 'n' Roll 1984)
- Frank Zappa, Lumpy Gravy (Verve, 1967)
