= Best of Vegas =

Live album by Frank Sinatra
- Released: February 8, 2011
- Recorded: 1961–1987
- Genre: Vocal jazz; traditional pop
- Length: 58:42
- Label: Concord
- Producer: Charles Pignone

Frank Sinatra chronology
The Reprise Years (2010)	Best of Vegas (2011)	Sinatra/Basie: The Complete Reprise Studio Recordings (2011)

Professional ratings
Review scores
Source	Rating
AllMusic	4/5 stars

Best of Vegas is a 2011 live album by American singer Frank Sinatra that contains 17 live tracks from the 2006 box set, Sinatra: Vegas.

In the span of a few years, Las Vegas refueled Sinatra's career and Sinatra in turn became the lead figure in the city's ascendance. It was a synergistic relationship that has since become legendary in the annals of 20th century entertainment.

The collection includes live performances of pop standards such as "The Lady Is a Tramp", "I've Got You Under My Skin", "All or Nothing at All", "Pennies from Heaven" and the "Theme from New York, New York".

== Track listing ==
1. Introduction – 0:26
2. "The One I Love (Belongs to Somebody Else)" (Isham Jones, Gus Kahn) – 2:39
3. "Moonlight in Vermont" (John Blackburn, Karl Suessdorf) – 3:07
4. "The Lady Is a Tramp" (Richard Rodgers, Lorenz Hart) – 3:40
5. "I've Got You Under My Skin" (Cole Porter) – 3:27
6. "Street of Dreams" (Sam M. Lewis, Victor Young) – 2:13
7. "Fly Me to the Moon (In Other Words)" (Bart Howard) – 2:49
8. Monologue – 8:33
9. "Luck Be a Lady" (Frank Loesser) – 4:34
10. "I Can't Get Started" (Vernon Duke, Ira Gershwin) – 3:05
11. "Without a Song" (Edward Eliscu, Billy Rose, Vincent Youmans) – 3:48
12. "All or Nothing at All" (Arthur Altman, Jack Lawrence) – 3:21
13. "Witchcraft" (Cy Coleman, Carolyn Leigh) – 2:43
14. "Pennies from Heaven" (Johnny Burke, Arthur Johnston) – 3:41
15. "Angel Eyes" (Earl Brent, Matt Dennis) – 7:45
16. "Theme from New York, New York" (Fred Ebb, John Kander) – 4:40
17. Bows – 0:55
- Tracks 1–4 from the Sands Hotel, November 2, 1961
- Tracks 5–9 from the Sands Hotel, January–February 1966
- Tracks 10–12, 16–17 from Caesars Palace, March 1982
- Tracks 13–15 from the Golden Nugget, April 1987

== Track listing ==
- Frank Sinatra - Vocals
- Bill Miller - Conductor, Piano
- Quincy Jones - Conductor, Arranger
- Antonio Morrelli - Conductor
- Vincent Falcone Jr. - Conductor, Piano
- Count Basie - Piano
- Lou Levy - Piano
- Tony Mottola - Guitar
- Al Viola - Guitar
