= Sinatra and Strings =

Studio album by Frank Sinatra
- Released: January 1962
- Recorded: November 20–22, 1961, Hollywood, Los Angeles, California
- Genres: Vocal jazz; traditional pop
- Length: 34:50
- Labels: Reprise; FS 1004

Frank Sinatra chronology
I Remember Tommy (1961)	Sinatra and Strings (1962)	Point of No Return (1962)

Professional ratings
Review scores
Source	Rating
AllMusic	3.5/5 stars
Encyclopedia of Popular Music	4/5 stars
DownBeat	3.5/5 stars

Sinatra and Strings is the twenty-fourth studio album by American singer Frank Sinatra consisting of standard ballads. It was arranged by Don Costa.

The album was the first that Sinatra recorded with Costa. They subsequently worked together on Cycles (1968), My Way (1969), A Man Alone (1969), Some Nice Things I've Missed (1974) and Trilogy (1980). Charles L. Granata, in his 2003 book Sessions with Sinatra: Frank Sinatra and the Art of Recording, felt the producer and mixing engineer of the album "chose to enhance the flat session tapes with just the right shower of reverberation, resulting in an appealingly glossy wet sound".

Costa subsequently felt that the album "was and always will be, the hallmark of my existence" and Sinatra's son, Frank Sinatra Jr., felt that the album with its large orchestra and "lush string sound" marked a new era in his father's recordings.

== Track listing ==
No.	Title	Writer(s)	Length
1.	"I Hadn't Anyone Till You"	Ray Noble	3:44
2.	"Night and Day"	Cole Porter	3:37
3.	"Misty"	Erroll Garner; Johnny Burke	2:41
4.	"Stardust"	Hoagy Carmichael; Mitchell Parish	2:48
5.	"Come Rain or Come Shine"	Harold Arlen; Johnny Mercer	4:06
6.	"It Might as Well Be Spring"	Richard Rodgers; Oscar Hammerstein II	3:15
7.	"Prisoner of Love"	Russ Columbo; Leo Robin; Clarence Gaskill	3:50
8.	"That's All"	Bob Haymes; Alan Brandt	3:21
9.	"All or Nothing at All"	Jack Lawrence; Arthur Altman	3:43
10.	"Yesterdays"	Otto Harbach; Jerome Kern	3:45
Total length:			34:50

1991 CD reissue bonus tracks
No.	Title	Writer(s)	Length
11.	"As You Desire Me"	Allie Wrubel	2:53
12.	"Don't Take Your Love from Me"	Henry Nemo	4:05
Total length:			41:48

== Complete personnel ==
- Frank Sinatra – vocals
- Don Costa – arrangement, conductor
