= Double or Nothing (1937 film) =

1937 musical comedy film

- Theatrical release poster
- Directed by: Theodore Reed
- Written by: Duke Atteberry; Erwin Gelsey; John Moffitt; Charles Lederer
- Story by: M. Coates Webster
- Produced by: Benjamin Glazer
- Starring: Bing Crosby; Martha Raye; Andy Devine; Mary Carlisle; William Frawley
- Cinematography: Karl Struss
- Edited by: Edward Dmytryk
- Music by: John Leipold; Victor Young
- Production company: Paramount Pictures
- Distributed by: Paramount Pictures
- Release date: September 17, 1937 (USA)
- Running time: 90 minutes
- Country: United States
- Language: English

Double or Nothing is a 1937 American musical comedy film directed by Theodore Reed and starring Bing Crosby, Martha Raye, Andy Devine, Mary Carlisle and William Frawley. Based on a story by M. Coates Webster, the film is about a dying millionaire who instructs his lawyer to drop twenty-five purses on the streets of New York City, which are found and returned by four honest people. According to the will, each of them is given five thousand dollars, which they must double within thirty days to claim one million dollars. Greedy relatives, who were cut from the will, try to thwart each one's plans. The film features the popular song "The Moon Got in My Eyes".

== Plot ==
Eccentric millionaire philanthropist Axel Clark wishes to prove that all people are essentially honest and good. Following his death and as a provision of his will, his lawyers drop wallets on the streets of a town that each has $100 in them, with information for contacting the lawyers. The four honest people who return the wallets then find themselves unexpectedly in a lottery. Each person is given $5000 and the first person who could double that sum within one month, through honest means, would inherit Clark's entire estate. Otherwise, the entire estate would go to Clark's brother, who is determined to thwart the plan.

Liza Lou Lane has added difficulty with the challenge. An ex-burlesque stripper, she automatically undresses herself whenever she hears her old theme music being played. The relatives place an orchestra on a flatbed truck and follow her around town, looking for chances to get her into embarrassing situations.

== Cast ==
- Bing Crosby as "Lefty" Boylan
- Martha Raye as Liza Lou Lane
- Andy Devine as Half Pint
- Mary Carlisle as Vicki Clark
- William Frawley as John Pederson
- Benny Baker as Sailor
- Samuel S. Hinds as Jonathan Clark
- William Henry as Egbert Clark
- Fay Holden as Martha Sewell Clark
- Bert Hanlon as Nick Praxitales
- Gilbert Emery as Mr. Mitchell
- Walter Kingsford as Mr. Dobson
- John Gallaudet as Johnny Rutherford
- Harry Barris as Sing Orchestra Leader
- Alphonse Bergé as Specialty
- Tex Morrissey as Specialty
- Frances Faye as Specialty, Liza's sister
- Elsie Ames as Dance Speciality, as Ames and Arno
- Nick Arno as Dance Specialty, as Ames and Arno
- Edward Rickard as Specialty
- Steve Calgary as Specialty
- Andre Calgary as Specialty
- Arthur Housman as Drunk
- Charles Irwin as Drunk
- James Notaro as Dancing Cop

== Production ==
Filmed in Hollywood from April 26 to June 15, 1937. The New York premiere was on September 1, 1937.

== Reception ==
The New York Times - "It is a tuneful show with three numbers better than average—"It’s the Natural Thing to Do”, “It’s On, It’s Off” and “The Moon Got in My Eyes”—but a show which lacks buoyance and sparkle, perhaps because of unimaginative direction....Although Bing delivers five songs in his customary agreeable voice and makes a pleasant enough suitor for the fair Mary Carlisle, it is really the explosive Miss Raye, the madcap adagio dance team of Ames and Arno and the Calgary Brothers (specialists in inebriation) who provide the brighter moments."

Variety - "Bing Crosby and Martha Raye are teamed again in Double or Nothing which should give the film big first run sendoffs, as their names are potent on marquees. . . This is not the first time that Crosby has carried a heavy load on his broad shoulders. Point is, can he keep on doing it indefinitely? He is strictly a personality, just passing fair as an actor, but his croon is unique and the wide radio exploitation he has keeps him a valuable asset for theaters. He needs carefully selected vehicles in which his share of the entertainment obligations is limited to his particular talents. . . Value of the Crosby warble is dimmed because he sings in nearly every episode in which he appears. Some of it is so casual that his major effort near the end of the picture falls rather flat."

The Washington Post - "That gorgeous rowdy-dow, Martha Raye, divides honors evenly with Bing Crosby, now undisputed king of the musicals, his mere crooner days forgotten...Bing Crosby was never better and this critic thinks never so good, as in Double or Nothing. This is praise with a vengeance. But when you see Monsieur Crosby dancing with Mary Carlisle and warbling such numbers as “Smarty”, “It’s the Natural Thing to Do”, “All You Want to Do Is Dance” and “After You” — well, we'll wager a plugged nickel against a double eagle that you'll agree. Bing is one of the few Hollywoodites who ripens mellowly."

== Soundtrack ==
- "(You Know It All) Smarty" (Burton Lane, Ralph Freed) by Bing Crosby
- "The Moon Got in My Eyes" (Arthur Johnston, Johnny Burke) by Bing Crosby
- "It's the Natural Thing to Do" (Arthur Johnston, Johnny Burke) by Bing Crosby
- "It's On, It's Off" (Al Siegel, Sam Coslow) by Martha Raye
- "After You" (Al Siegel and Sam Coslow) by Martha Raye, Frances Faye, Bing Crosby, Harry Barris and chorus.
- "Double or Nothing" (Johnny Burke, Victor Young) by chorus.
- "Listen, My Children, and You Shall Hear" (Burton Lane, Ralph Freed) by Martha Raye
- "Don't Look Now" (Sanford Green, Irving Kahal)
- "All You Want to Do Is Dance" (Arthur Johnston, Johnny Burke) by Bing Crosby

Bing Crosby recorded several of the songs for Decca Records. "The Moon Got in My Eyes" topped the charts of the day for four weeks and "It's the Natural Thing to Do" reached the No. 2 position. His songs were also included in the Bing's Hollywood series.

== Notes ==
The song, "It's The Natural Thing to Do" later adapted as a Popeye cartoon in 1939 produced by Fleischer Studios for Paramount Pictures.
