= My Way of Life =

Song by Bert Kaempfert, Herbert Rehbein, and Carl Sigman

"My Way Of Life"

Single by Bert Kaempfert and His Orchestra

from the album My Way Of Life
- B-side: "Malaysian Melody"
- Released: 1968
- Recorded: 1968
- Genre: Pop
- Length: 2:42
- Label: Polydor 59234
- Songwriters: Bert Kaempfert, Herb Rehbein, Carl Sigman

Bert Kaempfert and His Orchestra singles chronology
"The First Waltz" (1968)	"My Way Of Life" (1968)	"Steppin' Pretty" (1968)

"My Way Of Life" is a song written by Bert Kaempfert, Herbert Rehbein, and Carl Sigman, appearing in Kaempfert's 1968 album of the same name. The instrumental peaked at #17 on the Billboard Adult Contemporary Chart.

== Frank Sinatra version ==
Kaempfert, Rehbein and Sigman were regular songwriters of works sung by Frank Sinatra, with all three writing Sinatra's 1967 hit "The World We Knew (Over and Over)", and Kaempfert having additionally composed his number-one hit "Strangers In The Night" the year prior. Sinatra covered the song in his November 1968 album Cycles, his first recorded music since the release of Francis A. & Edward K. ten months prior; the longest period in Sinatra's Reprise years in which he did not commercially record music (barring his contributions to The Sinatra Family Wish You a Merry Christmas). The single peaked at #64 on the Billboard Hot 100 during the week of September 28, 1968.

== Chart history ==
=== Bert Kaempfert version ===
Chart (1968)	Peak position
U.S. Adult Contemporary	17

"My Way Of Life"

Single by Frank Sinatra

from the album Cycles
- B-side: "Cycles"
- Released: 1968
- Recorded: 1968
- Genre: Traditional pop
- Length: 3:05
- Label: Reprise 0764
- Songwriters: Bert Kaempfert, Herb Rehbein, Carl Sigman
- Producer: Don Costa

Frank Sinatra singles chronology
"Cycles" (1968)	"My Way Of Life" (1968)	"Stay With Me (Main Theme from "The Cardinal")" (1968)

=== Frank Sinatra version ===
Chart (1968)	Peak position
U.S. Billboard Hot 100	64

== In popular culture ==
A 1968 recording of the song by the Enoch Light Singers was sampled by the Avalanches in their 2000 single "Frontier Psychiatrist".

The Frank Sinatra version appeared in a post-credits scene in the finale episode of the 2022 Marvel Studios television miniseries Moon Knight, garnering renewed interest in the song on the social media video app TikTok.
