= The Good Thief (soundtrack) =

Soundtrack album by Elliot Goldenthal
- Released: 2002
- Genre: World; African; Alternative; Classical
- Length: 59:10
- Label: Island; CID 8130/068 864-2
- Producer: Elliot Goldenthal; Matthias Gohl

Elliot Goldenthal chronology
| Frida (2002) | The Good Thief (2002) | S.W.A.T. (2003) |

Professional ratings
Review scores
| Source | Rating |
|---|---|
| Movie-wave | 2/5 stars |

The score to the movie The Good Thief was produced and arranged by Elliot Goldenthal; whilst the score music is generally received favourably one major complaint is that it is too short and that the other tracks supersede Goldenthal's scoring work, it contains eight pieces by him and other artists including Cheb Khaled, Serge Gainsbourg, Johnny Hallyday and Bono; the song Bono covers is the Frank Sinatra song "That's Life", produced, with a string arrangement, by Goldenthal. The original score cues were performed by both The London Metropolitan Orchestra and The Irish Film Orchestra.

== Track listing ==
1. "Minuit" (5:50) - Cheb Khaled
2. "Lucky Eyes" (2:30) - Elliot Goldenthal
3. "A Thousand Kisses Deep" (6:27) - Leonard Cohen
4. "Endorphin Spoon" (1:54) - Elliot Goldenthal
5. "Verite" (6:06) - Rachid Taha
6. "Ouverture Francais" (1:54) - Elliot Goldenthal
7. "Parisien Du Nord" (3:31) - Cheb Mami and K-Mel
8. "Snake 5" (3:10) - Elliot Goldenthal
9. "Noir C'est Noir" (3:15) - Johnny Hallyday
10. "Waltz for Anna" (1:30) - Elliot Goldenthal
11. "Flashback" (6:21) - Intense
12. "36 Hadjini Street" (1:50) - Elliot Goldenthal
13. "Je T'Aime... Moi Non Plus" (4:22) - Serge Gainsbourg with Jane Birkin
14. "Confession to JC with Love" (1:17) - Elliot Goldenthal
15. "That's Life" (3:55) - Bono
16. "Redemption Rehearsal" (8:38) - Elliot Goldenthal
