= That's Life (song) =

1963 song written by Dean Kay and Kelly Gordon

Song by Marion Montgomery
- Released: 1963
- Genre: Traditional pop
- Label: Capitol
- Songwriters: Dean Kay; Kelly Gordon

"That's Life" is a popular song written by Dean Kay and Kelly Gordon, and first recorded in 1963 by Marion Montgomery. The song has an uplifting message that, despite the ups and downs in life, one should not give up but keep positive, because soon one will be "back on top."

The most famous version is by Frank Sinatra, released on his 1966 album That's Life. Sinatra recorded the song after hearing an earlier recording of it by O.C. Smith; the song proved successful and reached the #4 on the Billboard Hot 100 singles chart. Following the success of Sinatra's version, it was subsequently recorded by a number of artists including Aretha Franklin, James Booker, Shirley Bassey, James Brown, Van Morrison, David Lee Roth, Michael Bolton, Lady Gaga, Michael Bublé, Russell Watson, Deana Martin, and Holt McCallany. Sinatra's version appeared in the 1993 film A Bronx Tale, the 1995 film Casper, the 2019 film Joker and its 2024 sequel Joker: Folie à Deux, the 2004 video game Tony Hawk's Underground 2, as well as the sixth season finale of Brooklyn Nine-Nine, while a cover by Bono was on the soundtrack of The Good Thief (2002). The song was sung by Manny Delgado (Rico Rodriguez) in the episode "Bad Hair Day" of the television show Modern Family.

== Background ==
Marion Montgomery was signed to Capitol Records after being discovered by singer Peggy Lee. Montgomery recorded "That's Life", written by Dean Kay and Kelly Gordon, in 1963. It was released the same year, but failed to chart.

== Frank Sinatra version ==
"That's Life"

Single by Frank Sinatra

from the album That's Life
- B-side: "The September of My Years"
- Released: November 1966
- Recorded: July 25, 1966
- Studio: United Recording, Hollywood
- Genre: Traditional pop; R&B
- Label: Reprise
- Songwriters: Dean Kay; Kelly Gordon
- Producer: Jimmy Bowen

Frank Sinatra singles chronology
"Summer Wind" (1966)	"That's Life" (1966)	"Somethin' Stupid" (1967)

While "That's Life" was first recorded by Marion Montgomery, the song came to the attention of Frank Sinatra when he heard O. C. Smith's chart-climbing version in his car in 1965. He stopped the car, called his daughter Nancy and told her to find the publisher of the song because he wanted to record it; she did. Sinatra first performed the song on his television special A Man and His Music – Part II in 1966, with an arrangement by Nelson Riddle.

The recorded version, made on July 25, 1966 at United Recording, Hollywood, was arranged and conducted by Ernie Freeman and produced by Jimmy Bowen. The trio had previously worked together earlier in 1966 on "Strangers in the Night", which got Sinatra the Grammy Award for Best Male Vocal. For "That's Life", the background singers were the vocal contractor and singer B.J. Baker, along with Gwen Johnson and Jackie Ward. 40 first-chair musicians were also assembled for Sinatra's recording including Glen Campbell and many of the members of the Wrecking Crew. Sinatra took two passes at the song. He ended the first take with, "Oh yeah." Bowen asked him to perform it again, which annoyed 'one take' Sinatra – resulting in the biting performance Bowen was looking for - which Sinatra tagged with the defiant, "My, My".

Bowen's vision for the rest of the album was to mirror "That's Life" onto the other songs so they all sounded similar, rather than fill it with what he viewed as typical Sinatra-style songs. This was as a result of his work on the Strangers in the Night album, where Bowen felt that the titular single did not match the rest of the album, which was more of a classic Sinatra sound. So for the That's Life album, the other album tracks had similar brass accompaniments.

Both the album and the song proved major successes for Sinatra. The song was a number-four hit on the US Billboard Hot 100 chart and reached number one on the Easy Listening chart for three weeks in December 1966/January 1967. In Canada, the song reached number three. Sinatra's recording of "That's Life" was later used in the 1993 film A Bronx Tale alongside his recording of "Same Old Song and Dance". It was also featured in the 2004 video game Tony Hawk's Underground 2, and also plays during the game's credits. The song was also in the 1988 film License to Drive, a scene where the main character puts clown makeup on and the final scene of the 2019 film Joker, and during the final scene of the final episode of the sixth season of the NBC television comedy series Brooklyn Nine-Nine.

=== Personnel ===
==== Vocalists ====
- Frank Sinatra – lead vocals
- Betty Allan – background vocals
- Betty Jean Baker – background vocals
- Gwenn Johnson – background vocals
- Jackie Ward – background vocals

==== Leaders ====
- Ernie Freeman – arranger and conductor
- Donnie Lanier – conductor

==== String section ====
- Norman Botnick – viola
- Ray Brown – string bass
- Joseph DiFiore – viola
- Joseph DiTullio – cello
- Armand Kaproff – cello
- Alex Neiman – viola
- Kurt Reher – cello
- Frederick Seykora – cello
- Abraham Weiss – viola

==== Horn section ====
- Louis Blackburn – trombone
- Buddy Collette – saxophone, woodwinds
- Bill Green – saxophone, woodwinds
- Dick Hyde – trombone
- Plas Johnson – saxophone, woodwinds
- Cappy Lewis – trumpet
- Lew McCreary – trombone
- Oliver Mitchell – trumpet
- Willie Schwartz – saxophone, woodwinds
- Anthony Terran – trumpet

==== Rhythm section ====
- Hal Blaine – drums
- Eddie Brackett Jr. – percussion
- Lawrence Knechtel – Fender bass
- Michael Melvoin – organ
- Bill Miller – piano
- Ray Pohlman – electric guitar

== Other versions ==
=== 1960s to 1970s ===
Although the O.C. Smith version had proved successful in areas such as Detroit and Los Angeles, it was not until Sinatra's cover of it went high in the charts that the earlier version was released nationally. As well as the Smith release, "That's Life" was recorded on several albums following Sinatra's success with it, including the Aretha Franklin album Aretha Arrives, in addition to recordings by The Temptations, Shirley Bassey, and James Brown. Brown recorded the song for his 1968 album Live at the Apollo, Volume II. Brown's studio-recorded version appeared on the soundtrack for the 1999 film EDtv. The Peddlers recorded a version in 1969 which was released on a single.

=== 1980s to 2020s ===
Former Van Halen frontman, David Lee Roth, released a version and video, in 1986, for his first solo LP Eat 'Em and Smile. Deana Martin also recorded "That's Life" on her 2016 released album, Swing Street.

This was not the only occasion when the song appeared on a film's soundtrack. In 2002, a recording by Bono and composed by Elliot Goldenthal appeared on the soundtrack for The Good Thief. The song was also covered in "Opening Night", a second-season episode of the American television series Smash, by Katharine McPhee and Megan Hilty. Vik Sahay performed the song on an episode of Preacher.

Lady Gaga performed the song in the American musical thriller film Joker: Folie à Deux (2024). She released her version of the song on Harlequin (2024), a companion album to the film.

T-Pain performed the song during his well received concert series at the Sun Rose (5M+ views of the full concert on Youtube)

== Charts ==
Frank Sinatra version

Chart (1966–67)	Peak position
Canada RPM Top Singles	3
US Billboard Hot 100	4
US Easy Listening (Billboard)	1
US R&B (Billboard)	25
UK Singles Chart (OCC)	44

David Lee Roth version

Chart (1986)	Peak position
US Billboard Hot 100 (Billboard)	85

Van Morrison with Georgie Fame version

Chart (1996)	Peak position
UK Singles Chart (OCC)	92

== Certifications ==
Region	Certification	Certified units/sales
Italy (FIMI) Frank Sinatra version	Gold	50,000^{‡}
New Zealand (RMNZ) Frank Sinatra version	Gold	15,000^{‡}
Spain (Promusicae) Frank Sinatra version	Gold	30,000^{‡}
United Kingdom (BPI) Frank Sinatra version	Platinum	600,000^{‡}
^{‡} Sales+streaming figures based on certification alone.

== See also ==
- List of number-one adult contemporary singles of 1966 (U.S.)

== Sources ==
- Friedwald, Will (1995). Sinatra! The Song is You. New York: Scribner. ISBN 9780684193687.
- Leszczak, Bob (2014). Who Did It First?: Great Pop Cover Songs and Their Original Artists. Lanham, Maryland: Rowman & Littlefield. ISBN 9781442230675.
- Shaw, Arnold (1982). Sinatra, The Entertainer. New York: Delilah.
- Whitburn, Joel (2002). Top Adult Contemporary: 1961–2001. Menomonee Falls, Wisconsin: Record Research.

Certain revisions by Dean Kay writer of "That's Life" and recording session attendee. deankay.com
