= Sinatra/Basie: The Complete Reprise Studio Recordings =

Compilation album by Frank Sinatra
- Released: September 6, 2011
- Recorded: October 2–3, 1962 – June 1964
- Genre: Vocal jazz, big band
- Length: 59:53
- Label: Concord

Frank Sinatra chronology
Best of Vegas (2011)	Sinatra/Basie: The Complete Reprise Studio Recordings (2011)	Sinatra: Best of the Best (2011)

Sinatra/Basie: The Complete Reprise Studio Recordings is a 2011 compilation album by American singer Frank Sinatra that consists of 20 songs he recorded with jazz pianist Count Basie. Ten of the tracks are taken from the 1962 album Sinatra–Basie: An Historic Musical First, and the other ten from It Might as Well Be Swing (1964). The album reached number one on the Billboard traditional jazz albums chart in September 2011.

== Track listing ==
1. "Pennies from Heaven" (Arthur Johnston, Johnny Burke) – 3:29
2. "Please Be Kind" (Saul Chaplin, Sammy Cahn) – 2:43
3. "(Love Is) The Tender Trap" (Cahn, Jimmy Van Heusen) – 2:37
4. "Looking at the World Through Rose Colored Glasses" (Jimmy Steiger, Tommy Malie) – 2:32
5. "My Kind of Girl" (Leslie Bricusse) – 4:37
6. "I Only Have Eyes for You" (Harry Warren, Al Dubin) – 3:31
7. "Nice Work If You Can Get It" (George Gershwin, Ira Gershwin) – 2:37
8. "Learnin' the Blues" (Dolores Vicki Silvers) – 4:25
9. "I'm Gonna Sit Right Down and Write Myself a Letter" (Fred Ahlert, Joe Young) – 2:36
10. "I Won't Dance" (Jerome Kern, Jimmy McHugh, Oscar Hammerstein II, Dorothy Fields, Otto Harbach) – 4:07
11. "Fly Me to the Moon (In Other Words)" (Bart Howard) – 2:30
12. "I Wish You Love" (Léo Chauliac, Charles Trenet, Albert Beach) – 2:56
13. "I Believe in You" (Frank Loesser) – 2:21
14. "More (Theme from Mondo Cane)" (Riz Ortolani, Nino Oliviero, Marcello Ciorciolini, Norman Newell) – 3:05
15. "I Can't Stop Loving You" (Don Gibson) – 3:00
16. "Hello, Dolly!" (Jerry Herman) – 2:45
17. "I Wanna Be Around" (Johnny Mercer, Sadie Vimmerstedt) – 2:25
18. "The Best Is Yet to Come" (Cy Coleman, Carolyn Leigh) – 3:10
19. "The Good Life" (Sacha Distel, Jack Reardon) – 3:10
20. "Wives and Lovers" (Burt Bacharach, Hal David) – 2:50
