= S.W.A.T. (soundtrack) =

Soundtrack album by Elliot Goldenthal and various artists
- Released: August 12, 2003
- Studios: Manhattan Center Studios, New York City
- Genres: Film score; nu metal; electronic rock; alternative rock
- Length: 46:58
- Label: Varèse Sarabande
- Producers: Matthias Gohl; Elliot Goldenthal

Elliot Goldenthal and various artists chronology
The Good Thief (2002)	S.W.A.T. (2003)	Across the Universe (2007)

Professional ratings
Review scores
Source	Rating
Allmusic	2/5 stars
Filmtracks	3/5 stars
MovieMusicUK	4/5 stars
Movie-Wave	4/5 stars
Soundtrack-Express	4/5 stars

S.W.A.T. is the soundtrack score for the 2003 action film S.W.A.T., based on the 1970s TV series of the same name, composed by Elliot Goldenthal.

== Track listing ==
1. Bullet Frenzy (10:17)
2. Don't Shoot Me Baby (3:26)
3. My Big Black Assault Weapon (1:38)
4. AK-47 Scherzo (3:42)
5. Three Chords in Two Minutes (1:53)
6. Run for Your Life (3:05)
7. The Fascist Shuffle (1:29)
8. "S.W.A.T. 911" (3:10) - Danny Saber
9. Figure.09 (3:18) - Linkin Park
10. That Cop Stole My Car (2:04)
11. S.W.A.T. Sticker (0:53)
12. Bullet Frenzy II (1:38)
13. Time is Running Out (4:59) - Apollo Four Forty
14. Samuel Jackson (4:03) - Hot Action Cop
