= Happiness Is Dean Martin =

Studio album by Dean Martin
- Released: April 1967
- Recorded: March 1967
- Genres: Traditional pop, country
- Length: 29:28
- Labels: Reprise; RS 6242
- Producer: Jimmy Bowen

Dean Martin chronology
The Dean Martin TV Show (1966)	Happiness Is Dean Martin (1967)	Welcome to My World (1967)

Happiness Is Dean Martin is the twenty-third studio album by Dean Martin arranged by Ernie Freeman and Bill Justis.

This was the first of two albums that Martin released in 1967. He had released five albums in 1966, as well as appearing in his television show and starring in three films. Martin's eight previous singles had been Top 40 hits between 1964 and 1966; three tracks from this album, "Nobody's Baby Again", "(Open Up the Door) Let the Good Times In," and "Lay Some Happiness on Me," had previously been released as singles. Happiness Is Dean Martin peaked at 46 on the Billboard 200, while two of his albums from 1966 were still on the charts.

"I'm Not the Marrying Kind", Martin's recording of Lalo Schifrin's theme song to the 1966 Matt Helm film he starred in, Murderer's Row, appears on this album. It did not appear on the film's soundtrack. Happiness Is Dean Martin was reissued on CD by Hip-O Records in 2009.

Martin finished recording the album two days before an engagement at the Sands Hotel in Las Vegas. His popularity at the Sands was such that Variety reported that "the room could have been filled twice over for each of the two shows".

The album cover shows Dean holding the Mattel doll called "Baby's Hungry!" that was new for 1967. (Mattel toys were sometimes featured on the Dean Martin Variety Hour. In a clip from one show in 1965, Dean sings "Thank Heaven for Little Girls" surrounded by the Mattel doll that was new for 1965, "Baby First Step".)

== Reception ==
Professional ratings
Review scores
Source	Rating
Allmusic	2.5/5 stars

The initial Billboard review from May 6, 1967 commented that "Martin continues his winning style here...his relaxed smooth singing was never better". William Ruhlmann on Allmusic.com gave the album two and a half stars out of five. Noting the relatively poor chart performance of Martin's recent singles, Ruhlmann commented that it was time to "change the formula", but described Martin's cover of Patsy Cline's song "She's Got You" as the most impressive on the album.

== Track listing ==
Side One:

1. "Lay Some Happiness on Me" (Jean Chapel, Bob Jennings) – 2:20
2. "Think About Me" (Michelle Lewis) – 2:39
3. "I'm Not the Marrying Kind (Matt Helm's Theme)" (Lalo Schifrin) – 2:00
4. "If I Ever Get Back to Georgia" (Baker Knight) – 2:44
5. "It Just Happened That Way" (Fred Carter, Jr.) – 2:57
6. "(Open Up the Door) Let the Good Times In" (Ramona Redd, Mitchell Torok) – 3:19

Side Two:

1. "You've Still Got a Place in My Heart" (Leon Payne) – 2:48
2. "Sweet, Sweet Lovable You" (Dick Glasser) – 2:33
3. "He's Got You" (Hank Cochran) – 2:45
4. "Thirty More Miles to San Diego" (Casey Anderson) – 2:57
5. "Nobody's Baby Again" (Knight) – 2:26

== Personnel ==
- Dean Martin – vocals
- Ernie Freeman – arranger
- Bill Justis
- Ed Thrasher – art direction
- Eddie Brackett – engineer
- Lee Herschberg
- Stan Cornyn – liner notes
- Jimmy Bowen – producer
- Hal Blaine - drums
