= In the Blue of Evening =

"In the Blue of Evening" is a song by Al D'Artega and Tom Adair recorded and released in 1943 by Tommy Dorsey and his Orchestra, with Frank Sinatra as the main vocalist. It was subsequently re-recorded by Sinatra, but did not feature on a release until a 1993 reissue of the album I Remember Tommy.

== Recording and release ==
"In the Blue of Evening" was written by Al D'Artega and Tom Adair, and recorded by Frank Sinatra with the Tommy Dorsey Band. Recorded June 1942, it was released in 1943 as a double A side alongside "It's Always You", another Sinatra and Dorsey recording, in Victor's regular pop series (catalog #27947) to celebrate the signing of Dorsey's band to the Victor Red Seal label. "In the Blue of Evening" reached number one in the Billboard charts following the 1943 release. This recording also hit number ten on the Harlem Hit Parade chart.

Sinatra later re-recorded it with Sy Oliver for his 1961 album I Remember Tommy, a tribute to Dorsey following the bandleader's death. But it was not included on the album for the original release, only being added in a 1993 reissue. Unlike the other songs on the album, it was recorded with a 12-piece band and played in a manner similar to Dorsey; the other songs were all re-recorded with a 20-piece band. Replacing Dorsey, James Decker played the trombone solo at the start of the song.

== Reception ==
Janice Rhea, while writing for the Naugatuck Daily News after the initial recording in 1942, described "In the Blue of Evening" as a "thrilling, romantic song", which Sinatra performed in his "usual captivating fashion". She added that the trombone solo by Dorsey was a "piece of superlative horn work". She recommended it "unhesitatingly", and said it was "summer music of the very best quality". In The Mason City Globe-Gazette review from 1943 following the release, it was described as the "epitome of all that the name Frank Sinatra means to his avid admirers and followers", while Dorsey was described as having "mastery of that lush trombone quality of which never fails to bring the house down".
