= Avo Uvezian =

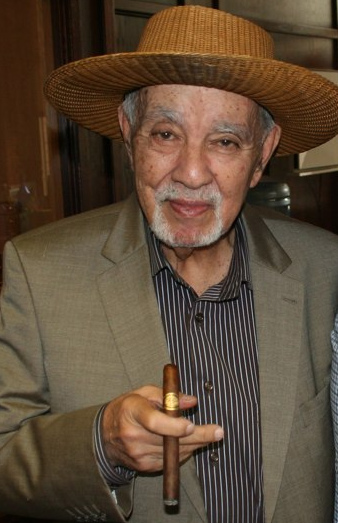
- Uvezian in 2011

Background information
- Born: March 22, 1926; Beirut, French Lebanon
- Died: March 24, 2017 (aged 91) Orlando, Florida, U.S.
- Genre: Jazz
- Instrument: Piano

Avo Uvezian (March 22, 1926, in Beirut, French Lebanon – March 24, 2017, in Orlando, FL) was an Armenian-American cigar manufacturer, jazz pianist and composer.

== Early life ==
Avedis "Avo" Uvezian was born to a family of musicians. His mother was a singer, while his father was a composer and conductor for a symphony orchestra. His parents' experience with music allowed him to develop his talents as a young man.

== Career ==
Uvezian joined a jazz trio called the Lebanon Boys. They received a contract to perform at a hotel in Baghdad where they stayed for one year. After this, they signed a contract to perform at a hotel in Iran. While there, Avo received an invitation from Shah Reza Pahlavi to perform at his palace. In an interview with Cigar Aficionado, Avo described this point in his career:

"I spoke Farsi (referring to Persian), so it sort of broke the ice with the Shah. I remember they were trying to dance the jitterbug and I said, 'You don't know how to dance that right. Let me show you.' We were invited back for two or three more events and finally, I became the Shah's pianist. The hotel didn't care since the Shah owned it.

After a year of performing in Iran, the Shah arranged for Avo to travel to the United States of America in 1947. While living in New York, Avo played for multiple bands while studying classical piano and composition at the Juilliard School.

Uvezian was drafted during the Korean War and sent to Fort Dix in New Jersey where he was put through infantry training. After impressing his officers with his musical talents, Uvezian was taken out of the Infantry and put into band training. When he arrived in Korea, the band would play at an Officers Club where they got paid twenty dollars a night. Uvezian was honorably discharged in 1952.

After being discharged, Uvezian spent the next few years working with his father-in-law designing jewelry. This eventually brought him to Puerto Rico where he was paid to perform at the Palmas Del Mar resort.

=== Songwriting ===
Uvezian claimed to have written the music for Frank Sinatra's song Strangers in the Night, even though the song is credited to Bert Kaempfert. When he was living in New York, a friend who knew Frank Sinatra set up a meeting to discuss one of his melodies. Somebody else had lyrics to it under the name "Broken Guitar". While Sinatra liked the melody, he asked for the lyrics to be altered. Sinatra recorded the song in 1966. However, before Sinatra heard the music, Uvezian had sent it to Kaempfert, for it to be published in Germany. While he is not officially credited for the song, Uvezian stated that Kaempfert himself had given him credit for its creation, including in a written letter.

=== Cigars ===
In 1983, when Avo's daughter Karyn was born, he went to Switzerland for her christening. Avo had a Cuban cigar after the meal and was not happy with the price. His friend mentioned that they should make their own. Uvezian traveled to the Dominican Republic, where he searched for two years for a satisfactory production facility. Avo finally met Hendrik Kelner, and after smoking samples, Avo offered Kelner twenty-five percent more than he had originally offered. His presumption was that paying Kelner more would ensure that Avo cigars would receive the best tobacco. Michael Roux advised Avo to use attractive packaging. In the first year, 120,000 Avo cigars were sold. By the third year, Avo sold over 750,000 cigars. In 1995, Davidoff paid Avo Uvezian an estimated $10 million for the rights to distribute his cigars. In 1996, more than two million Avo cigars were sold.

== Personal life ==
Avo met his wife, Marie Sahakian, while performing at a New York resort in the Catskill Mountains in 1951. They had three children: Jeffrey, Robert, and Ronny. Following a divorce and a move to Puerto Rico, Avo met and married his second wife. They had a daughter together: Karyn.

On April 27, 2020, Ronny, the youngest of Avo's sons from the first marriage, died suddenly.
