= Lay Some Happiness on Me =

Single by Dean Martin

from the album Happiness Is Dean Martin
- B-side: "Think About Me"
- Released: 1967
- Genre: Pop
- Length: 2:15
- Label: Reprise
- Songwriters: Jean Chapel & Bob Jennings
- Producer: Jimmy Bowen

"Lay Some Happiness on Me" is a song that was first released by Eddy Arnold in 1966, on the album Somebody Like Me. The song became a hit in 1967, when it was released by Dean Martin and by Bobby Wright.

Dean Martin's version spent 5 weeks on the Billboard Hot 100 chart, peaking at No. 55, while reaching No. 6 on Billboard's Easy Listening chart, and No. 44 on Canada's RPM 100.

Bobby Wright's version reached No. 44 on Billboard's Hot Country Singles chart.
