= Songs of Sinatra =

Studio album by Steve Tyrell
- Released: November 8, 2005
- Genre: Vocal jazz, classic pop
- Label: Hollywood Records

Songs of Sinatra is a tribute album by Steve Tyrell.

== Track listing ==
1. "I Get a Kick Out of You" (Cole Porter) - 4:01
2. "I Concentrate on You" (Porter) - 3:07
3. "Fly Me to the Moon" (Bart Howard) - 2:44
4. "Witchcraft" (Cy Coleman, Carolyn Leigh) - 3:13
5. "In the Wee Small Hours of the Morning" (Bob Hilliard, David Mann) - 3:10
6. "The One I Love (Belongs to Somebody Else)" [with Frank Sinatra, Jr.] (Isham Jones, Gus Kahn) - 2:47
7. "(I've Got You) Under My Skin" (Porter) - 3:47
8. "Bewitched, Bothered and Bewildered (Richard Rodgers, Lorenz Hart) - 4:26
9. "Night and Day" (Porter) - 3:47
10. "All the Way" (Sammy Cahn, Jimmy Van Heusen) - 3:41
11. "Nice 'n' Easy" (Alan Bergman, Marilyn Bergman, Lew Spence) - 3:36
12. "Somethin' Stupid" (Carson Parks) - 2:44
13. "All of Me" (Gerald Marks, Seymour Simons) - 3:35
14. "You Go to My Head" (J. Fred Coots, Haven Gillespie) - 4:23
