= The Moon Got in My Eyes =

"The Moon Got in My Eyes" is a 1937 song composed by Arthur Johnston, with lyrics written by Johnny Burke. It was written for the Bing Crosby musical comedy film of that year, Double or Nothing.

== History ==
The original recording was by Mildred Bailey on June 29, 1937, but the first theatrical release was with Bing Crosby on September 17 for the film Double or Nothing, under the direction of John Scott Trotter. It became a hit. Hal Kemp, the Shep Fields Orchestra with Bob Goday, Roy Fox and His Orchestra with Denny Dennis, Roy Smeck and His Serenaders with Donald King, Carroll Gibbons and The Savoy Hotel Orpheans, Sam Browne with the Ambrose Orchestra, Chick Bullock and His Orchestra and Jimmy Dorsey and His Orchestra with Bob Eberle all recorded the song in 1937 alone.

Victor Silvester and His Ballroom Orchestra recorded an instrumental version of the song in December 1937. The Joe Roland Quintette recorded it in June 1955 for the album Good Good Listening, and pianist Stanley Black recorded it for his 1957 album Moonlight Cocktail.

Frank Sinatra later recorded the song in late November 1965, and it appeared on his 1966 album Moonlight Sinatra, with a collection of other songs featuring the moon. Banu Gibson recorded a vocal version of the song for her 2016 album By Myself.
