= Nobody's Baby Again =

- German release picture sleeve

Single by Dean Martin

from the album Happiness Is Dean Martin
- B-side: "It Just Happened That Way"
- Released: 1966
- Genre: Traditional pop
- Length: 2:23
- Label: Reprise
- Songwriter: Baker Knight
- Producer: Jimmy Bowen

"Nobody's Baby Again" is a song written by Baker Knight, which was released in 1966 by Dean Martin. The song spent 6 weeks on the Billboard Hot 100 chart, peaking at No. 60, while reaching No. 6 on Billboard's Easy Listening chart. In Canada, the song reached No. 48 on the RPM 100 and No. 17 on the CHUM Hit Parade.

The song was ranked No. 67 on Billboard's ranking of "Top Easy Listening Singles" of 1966.

== Chart performance ==
| Chart (1966) | Peak position |
|---|---|
| US Billboard Hot 100 | 60 |
| US Billboard Easy Listening | 6 |
| Canada - RPM 100 | 48 |
| Canada - CHUM Hit Parade | 17 |
