= Moonlight Sinatra =

Studio album by Frank Sinatra
- Released: March 1966
- Recorded: November 29–30, 1965
- Studios: United Recording "A", Hollywood, Los Angeles
- Genres: Vocal jazz; traditional pop
- Length: 32:18
- Labels: Reprise; FS 1018
- Producer: Sonny Burke

Frank Sinatra chronology
A Man and His Music (1965)	Moonlight Sinatra (1966)	Strangers in the Night (1966)

Moonlight Sinatra is a studio album by the American singer Frank Sinatra, released in March 1966. All of the tracks on the album are centered on the Moon, and were arranged and conducted by Nelson Riddle and his orchestra. Moonlight Sinatra marked Sinatra's penultimate collaboration with Riddle (last being Strangers In the Night, recorded only months later).

The title of the album is a reference to Ludwig van Beethoven's Moonlight Sonata. Jimmy Durante’s nickname for Frank was “Moonlight Sinatra” as noted in a television interview with Edward R. Murrow, from Sinatra’s new home.

Professional ratings
Review scores
Source	Rating
AllMusic	3/5 stars
Encyclopedia of Popular Music	4/5 stars
Record Mirror	4/5 stars

== Track listing ==
1. "Moonlight Becomes You" (Johnny Burke, Jimmy Van Heusen) – 2:46
2. "Moon Song" (Sam Coslow, Arthur Johnston) – 3:03
3. "Moonlight Serenade" (Glenn Miller, Mitchell Parish) – 3:26
4. "Reaching for the Moon" (Irving Berlin) – 3:05
5. "I Wished on the Moon" (Dorothy Parker, Ralph Rainger) – 2:53
6. "Oh, You Crazy Moon" (Burke, Van Heusen) – 3:12
7. "The Moon Got in My Eyes" (Burke, Johnston) – 2:52
8. "Moonlight Mood" (Harold Adamson, Peter DeRose) – 3:08
9. "Moon Love" (Mack David, André Kostelanetz) (adapted from Tchaikovsky's Fifth Symphony, Second Movement) – 4:14
10. "The Moon Was Yellow (And the Night Was Young)" (Fred E. Ahlert, Edgar Leslie) – 3:04

== Personnel ==
- Frank Sinatra – vocals
- Nelson Riddle – arranger, conductor
- Bill Miller – piano
- Al Viola – guitar
- Ralph Pena, Eddie Gilbert – bass
- Irving Cottler – drums

== Charts ==
Chart (1966)	Peak position
US Billboard 200	34
