= (Open Up the Door) Let the Good Times In =

- Dutch release picture sleeve

Single by Dean Martin

from the album Happiness Is Dean Martin
- B-side: "I'm Not the Marrying Kind"
- Released: 1966
- Recorded: April 11, 1966
- Studio: United Western Recorders, Los Angeles
- Genre: Pop
- Length: 2:57
- Label: Reprise
- Songwriters: Mitchell Torok & Ramona Redd
- Producer: Jimmy Bowen

"(Open Up the Door) Let the Good Times In" is a song that was released by Dean Martin in 1966. The song spent six weeks on the Billboard Hot 100 chart, peaking at No. 55, while reaching No. 7 on Billboard's Easy Listening chart, and No. 51 on Canada's RPM 100.

Dean Martin recorded the song at the same recording session as Frank Sinatra when he recorded "Strangers in the Night" on April 11, 1966 at the United Western Recorders on Sunset Boulevard in Los Angeles. Among the musicians were Hal Blaine on drums and Glen Campbell on rhythm guitar.

== Chart performance ==
Chart (1967)	Peak position
US Billboard Hot 100	55
US Billboard Easy Listening	7
Canada - RPM 100	51
