= That's Life (Frank Sinatra album) =

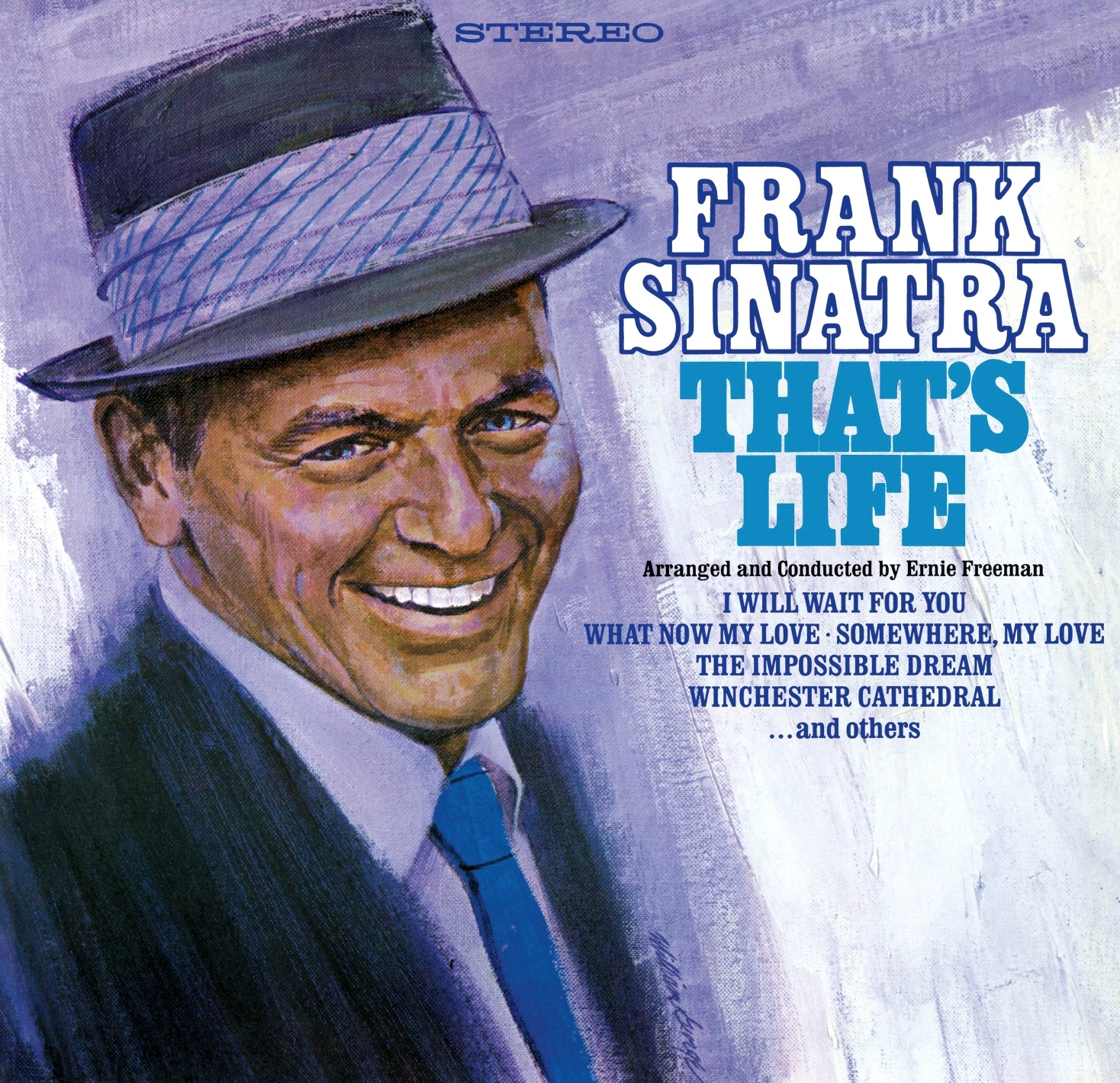
- Cover art by Bill George

Studio album by Frank Sinatra
- Released: November 18, 1966 (LP); October 6, 1986 (CD)
- Recorded: April 14, 1965 ("Tell Her"); October 18, 1966 ("That's Life"); November 17–18, 1966 (2–7, 9–10)
- Genres: Traditional pop; vocal jazz
- Length: 25:36
- Labels: Reprise; F 1020
- Producer: Jimmy Bowen

Frank Sinatra chronology
| Sinatra at the Sands (1966) | That's Life (1966) | Francis Albert Sinatra & Antônio Carlos Jobim (1967) |

Singles from That's Life
- 1. "That's Life" Released: 1966

Professional ratings
Review scores
| Source | Rating |
|---|---|
| AllMusic | 3/5 stars |

That's Life is a 1966 album by Frank Sinatra, supported by a studio orchestra arranged and conducted by Ernie Freeman. The album is notable for its title song, "That's Life", which proved to be a top five hit for Sinatra at a time when rock music dominated the music charts. That's Life was released on CD in October 1986.

== Track listing ==
1. "That's Life" (Dean Kay, Kelly Gordon) – 3:07
2. "I Will Wait for You" (Michel Legrand, Norman Gimbel, Jacques Demy) – 2:16
3. "Somewhere My Love (Lara's Theme)" (From Doctor Zhivago) (Paul Francis Webster, Maurice Jarre) – 2:19
4. "Sand and Sea" (Gilbert Bécaud, Maurice Vidalin, Mack David) – 2:29
5. "What Now My Love" (Bécaud, Carl Sigman, Pierre Delanoë) – 2:32
6. "Winchester Cathedral" (Geoff Stephens) – 2:38
7. "Give Her Love" (Jim Harbert) – 2:14
8. "Tell Her (You Love Her Each Day)" (Gil Ward, Charles Watkins) – 2:42
9. "The Impossible Dream (The Quest)" (Joe Darion, Mitch Leigh) – 2:34
10. "You're Gonna Hear from Me" (André Previn, Dory Previn) – 2:51

Notes

- Jacques Demy is also known as Jean Louis Demy
- Jim Harbert is also known as James Harbert
- Dean Kay is also known as Dean Kay Thompson
- The orchestra on "Tell Her (...Each Day)" features 10 violins
- The orchestra on "That's Life" features 12 violins
- The orchestra on tracks 2–7 and 9+10 features 8 violins

== Certifications ==
| Region | Certification | Certified units/sales |
|---|---|---|
| United Kingdom (BPI) | Silver | 60,000^{‡} |
| United States (RIAA) | Gold | 500,000^{^} |
^{^} Shipments figures based on certification alone.^{‡} Sales+streaming figures based on certification alone.

== Personnel ==
Vocalists

- Frank Sinatra – lead vocals (all tracks)
- Betty Allan – background vocals (8)
- Betty Jean Baker – background vocals (1, 8)
- Ella Halloran – background vocals (8)
- Jack Halloran – background vocals (8)
- Gwenn Johnson – background vocals (1)
- Bill Kanady – background vocals (8)
- Loulie Jean Norman – background vocals (8)
- Thurl Ravenscroft – background vocals (8)
- Paul Sandberg – background vocals (8)
- Jackie Ward – background vocals (1)

Leaders

- Ernie Freeman – arranger (all tracks), conductor (1–7, 9–10), piano (8)
- Gordon Jenkins – conductor (8)
- Donnie Lanier – conductor (1, 3, 5–8)

String section

- Chuck Berghofer – string bass (3, 5–8)
- Norman Botnick – viola (1)
- Ray Brown – string bass (1)
- Joseph DiFiore – viola (1)
- Joseph DiTullio – cello (1)
- Jesse Ehrlich – cello (2–10)
- Anne Goodman – cello (8)
- Elizabeth Greenschpoon – cello (2–7, 9–10)
- Harry Hyams – viola (2, 4, 8–10)
- Armand Kaproff – cello (1)
- Louis Kievman – viola (2–7, 9–10)
- Don Bagley – string bass (2, 4, 9–10)
- Alex Neiman – viola (1, 3, 5–8)
- Kurt Reher – cello (1)
- Emmet Sargeant – cello (8)
- Joseph Saxon – cello (8)
- Frederick Seykora – cello (1)
- Abraham Weiss – viola (1)

Horn section

- Louis Blackburn – trombone (all tracks)
- Bud Brisbois – trumpet (2, 4, 9–10)
- Robert Bryant – trumpet (8)
- Pete Carpenter – trombone (8)
- Roy Caton – trumpet (8)
- Buddy Collette – saxophone, woodwinds (1–2, 4, 9–10)
- Chuck Gentry – saxophone, woodwinds (2–7, 9–10)
- Bill Green – saxophone, woodwinds (1, 3, 5–7)
- Dick Hyde – trombone (1–7, 9–10)
- Plas Johnson – saxophone, woodwinds (1, 3, 5–7)
- Andreas Kostelas – saxophone, woodwinds (2–7, 9–10)
- Cappy Lewis – trumpet (1–7, 9–10)
- Lew McCreary – trombone (1, 3, 5–7)
- Jay Migliori – saxophone, woodwinds (2, 4, 9–10)
- Ollie Mitchell – trumpet (1, 3, 5–7)
- Al Porcino – trumpet (2–7, 9–10)
- Willie Schwartz – saxophone, woodwinds (1–2, 4–7, 9–10)
- Ken Shroyer – bass trombone (2, 4, 9–10)
- Tony Terran – trumpet (all tracks)
- David Wells – trombone (2–7, 9–10)

Rhythm section

- Hal Blaine – drums (1–2, 4, 8–10)
- Eddie Brackett Jr. – drums (3, 5–7), percussion (8, additional on 1)
- Russell Bridges – piano (8)
- Dennis Budimir – guitar (8)
- Frank Capp – percussion (8)
- Al Casey – acoustic guitar (1)
- Victor Feldman – percussion (2, 4, 9–10)
- Bobby Gibbons – guitar (2, 4, 9–10)
- John Gray – guitar (8)
- Larry Knechtel – Fender bass (1)
- Michael Melvoin – organ (1–7, 9–10)
- Bill Miller – piano (all tracks)
- Louis Morell – guitar (2–7, 9–10, acoustic on 1)
- Bill Pitman – guitar (8)
- Ray Pohlman – electric guitar (1)
- Emil Richards – percussion (3, 5–8)
- Tommy Tedesco – guitar (3, 5–7)
