= Parisien Du Nord =

1998 single by Cheb Mami and K-Mel

- Remix cover

Single by Cheb Mami and K-Mel

from the album Meli Meli
- Language: French; Arabic
- English title: Parisian of the North
- Released: 1998
- Recorded: 1998
- Studio: Mega (Paris)
- Genre: Raï; hip hop; pop
- Length: 4:36 (original); 3:32 (remix)
- Label: Virgin
- Songwriters: Mohamed Khelifati; Kamel Houairi; Pascal Perez
- Producer: Imhotep

Cheb Mami singles chronology
| "Sidi Boumedienne" (1998) | "Parisien Du Nord" (1998) | "Au Pays Des Merveilles" (1999) |

K-Mel singles chronology
| "Louled" (1996) | "Parisien Du Nord" (1998) | "Elle Revient Seule" (1999) |

Music video
- "Parisien Du Nord" on YouTube

"Parisien Du Nord" (French for "Parisian of the North") is a song by Algerian singer Cheb Mami and French-Algerian rapper K-Mel, originally recorded for Mami's eighth studio album Meli Meli. A remixed version was later re-produced and released as a single by Virgin Records in 1998, achieving significant commercial success. The remix was included on a reissue of his album released by Virgin Records.

== Background and composition ==
During the late 1990s, the fusion of traditional Algerian Raï music with French hip hop and R&B became highly popular in France, leading to a distinct subgenre often referred to as Raï'n'B. "Parisien Du Nord" is one of the most prominent examples of this cultural crossover.

The song's production was handled by Pascal Perez, better known as Imhotep, the beatmaker for the Marseille-based hip hop group IAM. The lyrics alternate between K-Mel's socially conscious French rap verses, which discuss the struggles and identity issues of North African immigrants living in France, and Cheb Mami's melancholic, soaring Arabic vocals in the chorus. Musically, the track relies on heavy sampling combined with Mami's distinct raï vocal deliveries. The beat interpolates and samples two classic hip hop and electro tracks: "Funk You Up" by American female hip-hop trio The Sequence and "Change the Beat (French Rap)" by French rapper Beside.

The song's thematic focus on immigration, racism, and the feeling of being treated as an outsider in one's own country ("sur mon visage vous m'avez renié et dit étranger" / "on my face you denied me and called me a foreigner") resonated deeply with the French-Maghrebi youth.

== Commercial performance ==
"Parisien Du Nord" was a major commercial success in Francophone Europe. It received heavy rotation on French radio and music television channels. The single peaked at number 5 on the French SNEP Singles Chart and reached number 8 on the Belgian Ultratop Wallonia chart, remaining on the charts for multiple weeks and becoming one of the defining French hits of 1998 and 1999.

== Track listing ==
- French CD Single
1. "Parisien Du Nord" – 3:29
2. "Parisien Du Nord" (Instrumental) – 3:22

== Charts ==
| Chart (1998–1999) | Peak position |
|---|---|
| Belgium (Ultratop 50 Wallonia) | 8 |
| France (SNEP) | 5 |
