= The One I Love (Belongs to Somebody Else) =

1924 song by Isham Jones and Gus Kahn

- Sheet music, 1924

Song by Isham Jones Orchestra
- B-side: "Wop blues"
- Published: January 7, 1924 by Milton Weil Music Co., Chicago
- Released: March 1924
- Recorded: December 21, 1923
- Studio: Brunswick Studios, 799 Seventh Avenue, New York City
- Genre: American Dance Music
- Label: Brunswick 2555
- Composer: Isham Jones
- Lyricist: Gus Kahn

Isham Jones Orchestra singles chronology
"Someone Else Walked Right In" (1923)	"The One I Love (Belongs to Somebody Else)" (1924)	"Never Again" (1924)

Audio sample
- Recording of The One I Love (Belongs to Somebody Else), performed by Harry Raderman's Dance Orchestra (1924): file; help

"The One I Love (Belongs to Somebody Else)" is a popular song composed by Isham Jones with lyrics by Gus Kahn. The song was recorded by Isham Jones' Orchestra on December 21, 1923, at Brunswick Studios in New York City, and published on January 7, 1924. On January 17 in Chicago, Jones recorded another version, with Al Jolson on lead vocals. Both versions made the charts that Spring, with Jolson's peaking at number 2, and Jones' at number 5. Sophie Tucker recorded her version February 1924, released on Okeh 40054.

== Other notable recordings ==
- Doc Cook and His Dreamland Orchestra, recorded at Harmon’s Dreamland Ballroom, Chicago 1924
- Tommy Dorsey (vocal by Jack Leonard) - this was a minor hit in 1938.
- Frank Sinatra recorded the song on June 27, 1940 with the Tommy Dorsey Orchestra and this reached the USA charts, peaking at No. 11. He re-recorded it in 1959 for his No One Cares album (though the track was unreleased until 1973), and he recorded it again on his 1961 I Remember Tommy album.
- Glenn Miller - recorded January 17, 1941 For Bluebird Records (catalog 11110).
- Ella Fitzgerald - recorded January 8, 1941 for Decca Records (catalog No. 3608A).
- Bing Crosby - recorded November 14, 1946 with John Scott Trotter and His Orchestra for Decca Records.
- John Serry - his arrangement was featured on Seeburg Corporation jukeboxes. (1950s).
- Doris Day - recorded November 9, 1951. Included in the album I'll See You in My Dreams (Songs from the Warner Bros. Production) (1952).
- Dinah Shore – Dinah, Yes Indeed! (1959)
- Julie London included the song on her Julie Is Her Name, Volume II (1958), and her 1968 album Easy Does It.
- Dean Martin - included in the album The Dean Martin TV Show (1966)
- Steve Tyrell and Frank Sinatra Jr. recorded a cover of the song on Tyrell's Songs of Sinatra album (2005).

== Film appearances ==
- 1949 The song was featured in the b-movie "The Last Crooked Mile"
- 1951 The song was performed by Doris Day in the film I'll See You in My Dreams. starring Doris Day and Danny Thomas. The film was based loosely on the lives of Gus Kahn and his wife Grace LeBoy Kahn.
- 1957 The Helen Morgan Story - performed by Ann Blyth (dubbed by Gogi Grant) at the nightclub.
