= In the Wee Small Hours of the Morning =

Song by Frank Sinatra

from the album In the Wee Small Hours
- Released: 1955
- Recorded: February 17, 1955
- Studio: KHJ Studios, Hollywood, California
- Genre: Traditional pop
- Length: 3:00
- Label: Capitol
- Composer: David Mann
- Lyricist: Bob Hilliard
- Producer: Voyle Gilmore

"In the Wee Small Hours of the Morning" is a 1955 popular song composed by David Mann, with lyrics by Bob Hilliard. It was introduced as the title track of Frank Sinatra's 1955 album In the Wee Small Hours.

== Background ==
Mann and Hilliard wrote it during a post-midnight session at Hilliard's New Jersey home. Mann was about to depart for New York, when Hilliard insisted he remain to try some impromptu songwriting. Mann reluctantly agreed and eventually came up with the tune, to which Hilliard quickly wrote a lyric.

== Other recordings ==
- Johnny Mathis, on the album Wonderful, Wonderful (1957).
- Andy Williams, on the album Lonely Street (1959).
- Ella Fitzgerald, on the album Ella Fitzgerald Live at Mister Kelly's (recorded 1958/rel. 2007).
- Julie London, on the albums Around Midnight (1960), The Ultimate Collection (2006)
- Art Blakey & the Jazz Messengers, on the album Caravan (1962).
- Oscar Peterson, on the album The Trio - Live from Chicago London House (1962)
- Gerry Mulligan, on the album Night Lights (1963)
- Johnny Hartman, featured on the album I Just Dropped By to Say Hello (1963).
- Frank Sinatra, on the album Sinatra's Sinatra (1963)
- Astrud Gilberto, on the album I Haven't Got Anything Better To Do (1969).
- Carly Simon, on her album My Romance (1990).
- Carly Simon, on the soundtrack to Sleepless in Seattle.
- Wynton Marsalis, on his 1990 album, "Standard Time Vol 3: The Resolution of Romance" released by CBS Records, Inc. with his father, the late Ellis Marsalis, on piano.
- Barbra Streisand has covered the song twice. On her 1991 retrospective, Just For the Record, Barbra sang a medley of "When You Gotta Go" and "Wee Small Hours of the Morning" (from a 1969 live performance). In 2009, Streisand recorded a new, studio version of "Wee Small Hours" for her album, Love is the Answer, produced by jazz artist Diana Krall.
- The Four Freshmen, on their 1994 album Voices in Standards
- Keith Jarrett, on his 1995 album, Keith Jarrett at the Blue Note.
- Liza Minnelli, on her 1996 album Gently.
- Carol Sloane, on her 1996 album, The Songs Sinatra Sang.
- John Pizzarelli, The John Pizzarelli Trio, After Hours (1996)
- Vanguard Jazz Orchestra, on Lickety Split (Jim McNeely arrangement) (1997).
- Nancy Sinatra, on her 1998 album, Sheet Music.
- Rosemary Clooney, on At Long Last (with the Count Basie Orchestra) (1998).
- Chris Botti, on his album Slowing Down the World (1999), featuring Sting on vocals - rereleased on Sting's Duets (2021).
- Nanci Griffith, on her 2001 album, Clock Without Hands.
- Jamie Cullum, on his album Pointless Nostalgic (2002).
- Steve Warren, on the album Today (2002)
- Ronnie Milsap, on his 2004 album Just for a Thrill.
- Dave Van Norden, featured in The Matador (2005).
- Steve Tyrell, on his album Songs of Sinatra (2005).
- Todd Gordon with trumpeter Guy Barker on Ballads from the Midnight Hotel (2007)
- Kurt Elling, on his 2007 release Nightmoves, as a medley with "Leaving Again" (Keith Jarrett).
- John Mayer with Chris Botti on the Late Show with David Letterman on Thanksgiving Day, 2008.
- Diana Krall (see Barbra Streisand entry)
- Gary Crosby on the album Gary Crosby Belts the Blues (1959)
- Steven Pasquale on the album Somethin' Like Love 2009 PS Classics
- Stacey Kent - Tenderly (2014)
- Christian McBride - on his album Bringin' It (2017)
- Enrico Pieranunzi Jazz Ensemble on the album Time's Passage (2020)
