= Summer Wind =

1965 song performed by Wayne Newton

Single by Wayne Newton

from the album Summer Wind
- B-side: "I'll Be Standing By"
- Released: 1965
- Genre: Traditional pop
- Length: 2:58
- Label: Capitol
- Songwriters: Heinz Meier (composer), Hans Bradtke (original lyricist), Johnny Mercer (English lyricist)
- Producers: T.M. Music, Inc.

"Summer Wind"

Single by Frank Sinatra

from the album Strangers in the Night
- B-side: "You Make Me Feel So Young"
- Released: August 1966
- Genre: Traditional pop
- Length: 2:58
- Label: Reprise
- Songwriters: Heinz Meier (composer), Johnny Mercer (lyricist)
- Producer: Sonny Burke

Frank Sinatra singles chronology
"Strangers in the Night" (1966)	"Summer Wind" (1966)	"That's Life" (1966)

"Summer Wind" is a 1965 song, originally released in Germany as "Der Sommerwind" and written by Heinz Meier and German language lyrics by Hans Bradtke. Johnny Mercer re-wrote the song into English along the same themes as the original, which talked of the changing of the seasons using the Southern European sirocco wind as a metaphor. In America, it was first recorded by Wayne Newton and subsequently by Bobby Vinton and Perry Como.

The song is best known for a 1966 recording by Frank Sinatra which peaked at number 25 on the Billboard Hot 100 chart and number one on the Easy Listening chart. The Sinatra version originally appeared on his album, Strangers in the Night. A variety of singers and bands have covered the song since, including Shirley Bassey, Fun Lovin' Criminals, Michael Bublé, James Dean Bradfield, and Martin Prince. Barry Manilow, Westlife, and Willie Nelson have included the song on their albums of jazz standards. In June 2026, CBS News included the song in its list of the 250 essential American songs of the past 250 years.

== Background ==
"Der Sommerwind" was a song composed in 1965 by Heinz Meier, with German language lyrics written by Hans Bradtke. The song was rewritten into English by Johnny Mercer, who had heard the song being sung by Danish singer Grethe Ingmann who had also recorded the song in her native language as "Sommervind". He wrote replacement lyrics along the same theme. The song talks of the sirocco wind which passes from North Africa into Southern Europe at the end of summer, and uses this as a metaphor for the changing of the seasons and the passing of time. It was recorded for the American market in 1965 by Wayne Newton as the title track for his album Summer Wind. At the time of his release, it was predicted to be as successful as his recording of "Red Roses for a Blue Lady," which had reached 23rd place on the Top 40 and the number four spot on the Easy Listening chart. However, although it did reach number nine on the Easy Listening Chart, it reached only the 78th position on the Hot 100. It was also recorded that year by both Bobby Vinton, and Perry Como. Como's version was recorded in Nashville in 1965 and was one of only seven tracks he worked on with Anita Kerr and her singers.

== Cover versions and in popular culture ==
=== Frank Sinatra version ===
The best known version of the song is by Frank Sinatra. He had previously worked with Mercer on a number of songs, including "One for My Baby (and One More for the Road)" and Nancy Sinatra would later recall Mercer being Sinatra's favourite lyricist. It was recorded for the singer's album Strangers in the Night, which was the final album he worked on with arranger and conductor Nelson Riddle. The composition of Sinatra's version used both an electronic organ and a big band, and the lyrics were modified to drop the second chorus. This was Mercer's final work to reach the top forty within the United States. Sinatra would later re-record the song with Julio Iglesias for the 1993 album Duets.

The song is also well known for being the last song played on New York City radio station WCBS-FM on June 3, 2005, before they flipped from classic hits to the Jack FM variety hits format. Two years later, the end of the song was also played by the station when they started the montage relaunching the classic hits format.

The B-side, "You Make Me Feel So Young," is a live version from the Sinatra at the Sands album, arranged by Quincy Jones and featuring the Count Basie Orchestra.

During an appearance on The Late Show With Stephen Colbert, Bruce Springsteen said he would choose Sinatra's version of the track when asked to hypothetically pick only one song to listen to for the rest of his life. Likewise, in an interview on the Yes Network's CenterStage, Bob Costas named "Summer Wind" his favorite song.

==== Appearances in other media ====
The song was featured in the films The Pope of Greenwich Village, Matchstick Men, and Blade Runner 2049.

In television, the song was featured at the end of the season six episode of The Simpsons titled "Bart of Darkness" (1994), and in the closing credits of the first episode of the second season of Ozark (2018).

== Charts ==
Wayne Newton version

Chart (1965)	Peak position
US Billboard Hot 100 (Billboard)	78

Frank Sinatra version

Chart (1966)	Peak position
Canada RPM Top Singles	24
US Billboard Hot 100	25
US Easy Listening (Billboard)	1
UK Singles Chart (Official Charts Company)	36

== See also ==
- List of Billboard Easy Listening number ones of 1966

== Sources ==
- Eskew, Glenn T. (2013). Johnny Mercer: Southern Songwriter for the World. Athens, Georgia: The University of Georgia Press. ISBN 9780820333304.
- Friedwald, Will (1995). Sinatra! The Song is You. New York: Scribner. ISBN 9780684193687.
- Macfarlane, Malcolm; Crossland, Ken (2009). Perry Como: A Biography and Complete Career Record. Jefferson, N.C.: McFarland & Co. ISBN 9780786437016.
- Whitburn, Joel (2002). Top Adult Contemporary: 1961–2001. Menomonee Falls, Wisconsin: Record Research.
