= Dean Kay =

American songwriter

- Also known as: Dean Kay
- Born: Dean Kermit Thompson; June 21, 1940
- Origin: Oakland, California, U.S.
- Genres: Pop; rock & roll; psychedelic rock; jazz
- Occupation: Composer
- Instruments: Vocals; piano; guitar
- Years active: Since 1962

Dean Kay (born June 21, 1940) is an American entertainer, recording artist, songwriter, and music publishing executive.

== Early life ==
Dean Kay was born on June 21, 1940, in Oakland, California. He attended San Jose State University in San Jose, California from 1958 to 1962.

== Career ==
While a student at San Jose State University, he began his professional career as a featured entertainer alongside singing partner Hank Jones on the five-day-a-week daytime Tennessee Ernie Ford Show, a five-day-a-week day from San Francisco. They recorded for both Del-Fi Records and RCA Victor.

As a songwriter he laid out songs for many top recording artists including "That's Life" for Frank Sinatra. He served as the chief operating officer (COO) for Lawrence Welk's music publishing companies for 18 years. Later, he became president/CEO of PolyGram International Publishing. Throughout his career, he has played a key role in safeguarding the creative legacies of Jerome Kern, Richard Rodgers, Oscar Hammerstein II, Cole Porter, Elton John, Bernie Taupin, Johnny Horton, Don Williams, Bob McDill, Wayland Holyfield, Ricky Skaggs, Rick Springfield, and many others.

Kay sits on the board of directors of ASCAP and the ASCAP Foundation. His past roles include positions on the Boards of The National Music Publishers Association (NMPA), The Harry Fox Agency (HFA), the Country Music Association (CMA), the Academy of Country Music (ACM), the California Copyright Conference (CCC), and the Association of Independent Music Publishers (AIMP). Kay publishes a daily email news digest called The Dean's List, which covers news about music, copyright and new technology in the entertainment industry. It has a sister web publication, The ASCAP Daily Brief, which is powered by The Dean's List.
