= Watertown (album) =

Studio album by Frank Sinatra
- Released: March 1970
- Recorded: July 14 – October 31, 1969
- Studios: Columbia (New York City); United Western Recorders (Los Angeles)
- Genres: Traditional pop; baroque pop; pop rock; folk rock
- Length: 33:33
- Label: Reprise
- Producer: Bob Gaudio

Frank Sinatra chronology
A Man Alone (1969)	Watertown (1970)	Sinatra & Company (1971)

Professional ratings
Review scores
Source	Rating
AllMusic	4.5/5 stars
Pitchfork	8.9/10

Watertown (subtitled A Love Story) is a studio album by American singer Frank Sinatra, released in March 1970 through Reprise Records. It is a concept album centered on a man from Watertown, New York. In a series of soliloquies, the nameless narrator tells his heartbreaking story of personal loss: his wife has left him and their two boys for the lure of the big city. Watertown was produced and co-written by Bob Gaudio, a founding member of the pop rock band the Four Seasons, with Jake Holmes also co-writing the songs. It is the only album where Sinatra ever voiced over pre-recorded orchestral tracks. The album was released to mixed critical reviews and poor sales; it was Sinatra's only major album release not to chart in the top 100 of the Billboard 200. It has since been reevaluated and many consider it to be among his finest albums.

== History and recording ==
In 1969, Sinatra's sales were low. To try to combat this, he agreed to record a concept album with Bob Gaudio and Frankie Valli of the Four Seasons and singer-songwriter Jake Holmes. Sinatra was no stranger to concept albums, having done them in the past, such as In the Wee Small Hours in 1955. Gaudio and Valli brought Sinatra a fully written album that told the story of a man raising his two young sons in Watertown after his wife leaves him for the city.

The album's orchestral tracks were recorded in New York at Columbia 30th Street Studio, also referred to as "The Church". Unlike previous work, Sinatra did not record with the orchestra, but he did attend the recording sessions for the music. He recorded his vocals over the pre-recorded tracks at United Western Recorders on Sunset Boulevard in Hollywood. He would never again record his vocals without a live orchestra.

Recording for the music took place from July 14 to 17 and October 13. Tracks 5 and 10 were recorded on July 14, tracks 1, 4, and 6 on July 15, tracks 8 and 9 on July 16, and 3,7, and 11 on July 17. "Michael and Peter", "Lady Day" and "For a While" were rerecorded October 13.

Sinatra recorded his vocals in California from August 25 to 27 and October 31. Tracks 5,9,10, and 11 were recorded on August 25, 1 and 8 on August 26 and 2 and 7 on August 27. Sinatra went back into the studio on October 31 to finish vocals for "Elizabeth", "Michael and Peter", and "For a While".

"I Would Be in Love (Anyway)" reached #77 in the Canadian pop charts, and #4 on the US Adult Contemporary charts.

== Story ==
The album is told in two parts with an epilogue. Part 1 is tracks 1–5 and tells the story of the main character's disbelief in his wife leaving. Part 2 is tracks 6–10 and tells of the main character's desperation. A 1994 CD bonus track "Lady Day" tells the story of his wife leaving Watertown for the city.

Jake Holmes, the lyricist, explained the story of each track to Ed O'Brien for the liner notes:

=== Part 1 ===
1. "Watertown": It was the set-up for everything that followed. I had in mind as a model "Lazy Afternoon". I wanted a languid feeling. If we had done the TV special, it would have opened it up, with the credits going by.

2. "Goodbye (She Quietly Says)": I had a line in my head. "There was no tempest in the tea". That's what led me there. I love the idea of those kind of goodbyes that people have where nothing is happening emotionally. It knocks me out when there is nothing on the surface. People are just sitting in a coffee shop and devastation has happened. They don't articulate their feelings. Instead, they are putting sugar in their coffee and spooning cake. They are having a quiet conversation but meanwhile a life is coming apart.

3. "For a While": I've always felt that there is that moment in your life when you forget about something that is really terrible. For five minutes the sun is shining and everything is beautiful. Then all of a sudden you realize that the person you cared about is gone, and it all comes back. It is one of those horrible things about grief – one of those little holes in grief when it becomes even more painful.

4. "Michael & Peter": I had lost a child in my first marriage. I would have had a child by myself if I could have (laughs). I desperately wanted kids. In a funny kind of way, Gaudio's kids were the models for that song. I put it in letter form, because it was the only way the guy could articulate those sentiments to her.

5. "I Would Be in Love (Anyway)": I guess it's that you can't regret where you are even if life takes you someplace where you don't want to be. In a strange kind of way, it was this guy trying to let go of this woman without being angry with her. You know, throughout the story, he was never really angry at her. He kind of understood; she had to go.

=== Part 2 ===
6. "Elizabeth". It was real simple. I just love that name. Bobby was writing the song and that word just fell into the melody. I just imagined a girl named Elizabeth and wrote words that were a tribute to her.

7. "What a Funny Girl (You Used to Be)": The album could have been a little bit maudlin and dour. I was trying to put a little bit of sunlight everywhere I could. It was a retrospective song. I also wanted to indicate in the song that they had been childhood sweethearts. I wanted that kind of an idea. They were probably kids together. I wanted to give the sense that they had gone to school together. They had fallen in love and married quite young.

8. "What's Now Is Now". There is in that song an indication that she had obviously gone with somebody else. She has had a relationship, and he hadn't been able to accept it. That is partially what drove her off to the big city. There is a guilt theme in that song. It is the song that opens up the story.

9. "She Says". The song is a triple turn to me. He is suspicious of the small talk. The kids are echoing his fears. Why is she sending this letter? What is going on? It is such good news; they can't believe it and they don't trust it. The twist is her saying, "She's comin' home". They don't trust that either.

10. "The Train": ... is the story. We find out that he really didn't communicate anything to her, and she isn't coming back. Although we're getting all of this story from him, she never got any of this. If she had heard this album, she might have come home. She never saw this side of him. When I think about this in retrospect, there is so much that is not done. There is so much that is unfinished. It gives the story a very deep resonance.

=== Epilogue ===
11. "Lady Day". I saw the woman as someone who had talent. She wanted to be an artist or a singer. He was a hometown person. His whole orientation was family and business. He was the kind of guy who really lived in Watertown. She was more restless – a more contemporary woman. She wanted to do other things. She wasn't liberated enough to tell him, and she didn't think he'd understand. He was basically a good guy, but she wanted more. She abandoned her family and went for a career. The postscript was whether or not she got it and was it worth it.

== Track listing ==
1. "Watertown" – 3:36
2. "Goodbye (She Quietly Says)" – 3:06
3. "For a While" – 3:09
4. "Michael & Peter" – 5:10
5. "I Would Be in Love (Anyway)" – 2:31
6. "Elizabeth" – 3:38
7. "What a Funny Girl (You Used to Be)" – 3:00
8. "What's Now Is Now" – 4:04
9. "She Says" – 1:51
10. "The Train" – 3:26

1994 CD bonus track

1. "Lady Day" – 2:47

2022 CD bonus tracks

1. "Lady Day" (11/7/69)*
2. "Watertown" (Session Take)*
3. "Goodbye (She Quietly Says) (Session Take)*
4. "The Train" (Session Take)*
5. "Lady Day" (11/7/69) (Session Take)*
6. 1970 Reprise Radio Promo #1*
7. 1970 Reprise Radio Promo #2*

All songs written by Bob Gaudio and Jake Holmes.

== Personnel ==
- Frank Sinatra – lead vocals
- Bob Gaudio – producer, composer, arranger
- Jake Holmes – lyricist
- Manny Green – concert master
- Lee Herschberg – digital mastering, mixing
- Roy Cicala – editing, remixing
- Frank Laico – engineer
- Don Snyder – album design
- Ove Olsen – pen & ink cover art
- Ed O'Brien – CD liner notes
- Joe McEwen – reissue supervisor

Track 1:

Wayne Andre, Warren Covington, Urbie Green (tbn); Tony Studd (b-tbn); Ray Alonge, James Buffington (fr-h); Phil Bodner, Wally Kane, Romeo Penque, William Slapin (wwd); Mannie Green, Max Cahn, Julius Held, Joe Malin, George Ockner, Rocco Pesile, Raoul Poliakin, Aaron Rosand, Max Pollikoff, Tosha Samaroff, Julius Schachter, Henri Aubert (vln); Alfred Brown, Harold Coletta, Richard Dickier, Cal Fleisig (via); George Ricci, Harvey Shapiro (vlc); Margaret Ross (harp); Dick Hyman (p); Jay Berliner, Ralph Casale (g); Stuart Scharf (classic g); Richard Davis (b); Alvin Rogers (d); David Carey (perc); Joe Scott (cond).

Track 2:

Wayne Andre, Warren Covington, Urbie Green (tbn); Tony Studd (b-tbn); Ray Alonge, James Buffington (fr-h); Phil Bodner, Wally Kane, Romeo Penque, William Slapin (wwd); Mannie Green, Peter Buonconsiglio, Max Cahn, Julius Held, Joe Malin, George Ockner, Rocco Pesile, Raoul Poliakin, Max Pollikoff, Tosha Samaroff, Julius Schachter, Henri Aubert (vln); Alfred Brown, Harold Coletta, Richard Dickier, Cal Fleisig (via); Kermit Moore, George Ricci, Harvey Shapiro (vlc); Dick Hyman (p); Vinnie Bell, Jay Berliner (g); Joseph Macho Jr. (b); Alvin Rogers (d); David Carey (perc). PLUS: Bill Miller (p), Al Viola (g), who backed Sinatra at the overdubbing; Joe Scott (cond).

Tracks 3, 4:

Wayne Andre, Warren Covington, Bill Watrous (tbn); Tony Studd (b-tbn); Ray Alonge, James Buffington (fr-h); Phil Bodner, Wally Kane, Romeo Penque, William Slapin (wwd); Mannie Green, Max Cahn, Peter Dimitriades, Lewis Eley, Leo Kahn, Joe Malin, George Ockner, Gene Orloff, Rocco Pesile, Raoul Poliakin, Aaron Rosand, Henri Aubert (vln); Alfred Brown, Selwart Clarke, Cal Fleisig, Emanuel Vardi (via); George Ricci, Harvey Shapiro (vlc); Margaret Ross (harp); Dick Hyman (p); Jay Berliner, Ralph Casale (g); Stuart Scharf (classic g); Joseph Macho Jr. (b); Alvin Rogers (d); David Carey (perc); Charles Calello (cond).

Track 5, 10:

Wayne Andre, Warren Covington, Urbie Green (tbn); Tony Studd (b-tbn); Ray Alonge, James Buffington (fr-h); Phil Bodner, Wally Kane, Romeo Penque, William Slapin (wwd); Mannie Green, Peter Buonconsiglio, Max Cahn, Julius Held, Joe Malin, George Ockner, Rocco Pesile, Raoul Poliakin. Max Pollikoff, Tosha Samaroff, Julius Schachter, Henri Aubert (vln); Alfred Brown, Harold Coletta, Richard Dickier, Cal Fleisig (via); Kermit Moore, George Ricci, Harvey Shapiro (vlc); Dick Hyman (p); Vinnie Bell, Jay Berliner (g); Joseph Macho Jr. (b); Alvin Rogers (d); David Carey (perc); Lois Winter, June Magruder, Peggy Powers (voe); Joe Scott (cond).

Track 6:

Wayne Andre, Warren Covington, Urbie Green (tbn); Tony Studd (b-tbn); Ray Alonge, James Buffington (fr-h); Phil Bodner, Wally Kane, Romeo Penque, William Slapin (wwd); Mannie Green, Max Cahn, Julius Held, Joe Malin, George Ockner, Rocco Pesile, Raoul Poliakin, Aaron Rosand, Max Pollikoff, Tosha Samaroff, Julius Schachter, Henri Aubert (vln); Alfred Brown, Harold Coletta, Richard Dickier, Cal Fleisig (via); George Ricci, Harvey Shapiro (vlc); Margaret Ross (harp); Dick Hyman (p); Jay Berliner, Ralph Casale (g); Stuart Scharf (classic g); Richard Davis (b); Alvin Rogers (d); David Carey (perc); Charles Calello (cond).

Track 7:

Wayne Andre, Urbie Green, Jimmy Knepper (tbn); Tony Studd (b-tbn); Ray Alonge, Brooks Tillotson (fr-h); Phil Bodner, Wally Kane, Romeo Penque, William Slapin (wwd); Max Cahn, Joe Malin, Peter Buonconsiglio, Julius Held, George Ockner, Rocco Pesile, Raoul Poliakin, Aaron Rosand, Tosha Samaroff, Julius Schachter, Henri Aubert, Mannie Green (vln); Alfred Brown, Harold Coletta, Richard Dickier, Cal Fleisig (via); George Ricci, Harvey Shapiro (vlc); Margaret Ross (harp); Moe Wechsler (p); Jay Berliner, Ralph Casale, Willard Suyker (g); Russell George (b); Alvin Rogers (d); David Carey (perc); Charles Calello (cond).

Track 8:

Ray Alonge, James Buffington (fr-h); Don Butterfield (tuba); Phil Bodner, Wally Kane, Romeo Penque, William Slapin (wwd); Mannie Green, Peter Buonconsiglio, Max Cahn, Joe Malin, George Ockner, Rocco Pesile, Raoul Poliakin, Max Pollikoff, Aaron Rosand, Tosha Samaroff, Julius Schachter, Henri Aubert (vln); Alfred Brown, Harold Coletta, Richard Dickier, Cal Fleisig (via); Kermit Moore, George Ricci, Harvey Shapiro (vlc); Dick Hyman (p); Vincent Bell, Jay Berliner (g); Michael Chimes (harmonica); Richard Davis (b); Alvin Rogers (d); David Carey (perc); Joe Scott (cond).

Track 9:

Ray Alonge, James Buffington (fr-h); Don Butterfield (tuba); Phil Bodner, Wally Kane, Romeo Penque, William Slapin (wwd); Mannie Green, Peter Buonconsiglio, Max Cahn, Joe Malin, George Ockner, Rocco Pesile, Raoul Poliakin, Max Pollikoff, Aaron Rosand, Tosha Samaroff, Julius Schachter, Henri Aubert (vln); Alfred Brown, Harold Coletta, Richard Dickier, Cal Fleisig (via); Kermit Moore, George Ricci, Harvey Shapiro (vlc); Dick Hyman (p); Vinnie Bell, Jay Berliner (g); Michael Chimes (harmonica); Richard Davis (b); Alvin Rogers (d); David Carey (perc). A vocal chorus [I]; Charles Calello (cond).

Track 11 (Lady Day):

Wayne Andre, Urbie Green, Jimmy Knepper (tbn); Tony Studd (b-tbn); Ray Alonge, Brooks Tillotson (fr-h); Phil Bodner, Wally Kane, Romeo Penque, William Slapin (wwd); Max Cahn, Joe Malin, Peter Buonconsiglio, Julius Held, George Ockner, Rocco Pesile, Raoul Poliakin, Aaron Rosand, Tosha Samaroff, Julius Schachter, Henri Aubert, Mannie Green (vln); Alfred Brown, Harold Coletta, Richard Dickier, Cal Fleisig (via); George Ricci, Harvey Shapiro (vlc); Margaret Ross (harp); Moe Wechsler (p); Jay Berliner, Ralph Casale, Willard Suyker (g); Russell George (b); Alvin Rogers (d); David Carey (perc); Charles Calello (cond).

== Charts ==
Chart performance for Watertown
Chart (1970)	Peak position
Canada Top Albums/CDs (RPM)	60
UK Albums (Official Charts)	14
US Billboard 200	101
Chart (2022)	Peak position
Scottish Albums (Official Charts)	83
