= Sinatra Swings =

- Original cover

Studio album by Frank Sinatra
- Released: July 1961
- Recorded: May 18, 19, 23, 1961
- Studio: United (Hollywood, Los Angeles)
- Genre: Vocal jazz; traditional pop
- Length: 33:02
- Label: Reprise; FS 1002
- Producer: Sonny Burke

Frank Sinatra chronology
Come Swing with Me! (1961)	Sinatra Swings (1961)	I Remember Tommy (1961)

Professional ratings
Review scores
Source	Rating
AllMusic	3.5/5 stars
Mojo	4/5 stars
Encyclopedia of Popular Music	4/5 stars
New Record Mirror	5/5

Sinatra Swings (originally titled Swing Along with Me) is the twenty-second studio album by American singer Frank Sinatra with Billy May and his Orchestra, released in July 1961.

The album's two titles derive from the fact that Capitol thought the album, originally titled Swing Along With Me, was too close in sound and title to Sinatra's earlier Capitol album Come Swing with Me! that the label sought, and was granted, a court order requiring Reprise to change the title of this, only his second Reprise album, to Sinatra Swings. Reprise was not required to recall LPs already shipped, but had to print new labels and jackets. All compact disc releases have retained the artwork with the alternate title intact.

It was advertised on the record sleeve as featuring "twelve of the most uninhibited Sinatra things ever recorded." The tracks were arranged and conducted by Billy May and his orchestra. Sinatra had a small hit with the single "Granada" included on this album.

== Track listing ==
No.	Title	Writer(s)	Length
1.	"Falling in Love with Love"	Richard Rodgers; Lorenz Hart	1:49
2.	"The Curse of an Aching Heart"	Henry Fink; Al Piantadosi	2:06
3.	"Don't Cry, Joe (Let Her Go, Let Her Go, Let Her Go)"	Joe Marsala	3:05
4.	"Please Don't Talk About Me When I'm Gone"	Sidney Clare; Sam H. Stept	2:56
5.	"Love Walked In"	George Gershwin; Ira Gershwin	2:19
6.	"Granada"	Dorothy Dodd; Agustín Lara	3:38
7.	"I Never Knew"	Ted Fio Rito; Gus Kahn	2:14
8.	"Don't Be That Way"	Benny Goodman; Mitchell Parish; Edgar Sampson	2:41
9.	"Moonlight on the Ganges"	Sherman Myers; Chester Wallace	3:18
10.	"It's a Wonderful World"	Harold Adamson; Jan Savitt; Johnny Watson	2:17
11.	"Have You Met Miss Jones?"	Richard Rodgers; Lorenz Hart	2:30
12.	"You're Nobody till Somebody Loves You"	James Cavanaugh; Russ Morgan; Larry Stock	4:09
Total length:			33:02

== Personnel ==
- Frank Sinatra - vocals
- Billy May - arranger, conductor
