= I Remember Tommy =

Studio album by Frank Sinatra
- Released: October 1961
- Recorded: May 1–3, 1961; Los Angeles
- Genre: Vocal jazz; traditional pop
- Length: 41:38
- Label: Reprise; FS 1003
- Producer: Gregg Geller

Frank Sinatra chronology
Sinatra Swings (1961)	I Remember Tommy (1961)	Sinatra and Strings (1962)

Professional ratings
Review scores
Source	Rating
AllMusic	3/5 stars

I Remember Tommy... is the twenty-third studio album by Frank Sinatra, released in 1961. It was recorded as a tribute to bandleader Tommy Dorsey, and consists of re-recorded versions of songs that Sinatra had first performed or recorded with Dorsey earlier in his career. Fellow Dorsey alumnus Sy Oliver arranged and conducted the sessions.

Of the twelve numbers on the album, Sinatra had recorded eleven with the Dorsey Orchestra. The opening number, "I'm Getting Sentimental Over You", was Dorsey's instrumental theme song. Sy Oliver, who was a Dorsey arranger when Sinatra was with the band, arranged three of the original recordings – "East of the Sun and West of the Moon", "Without a Song", and "The One I Love Belongs to Somebody Else". Axel Stordahl did the rest, except for "I'll Be Seeing You", arranged by Sy Oliver.

"The One I Love", the last vocal track on the album, has "a jaunty Sy Oliver treatment with Oliver himself singing counterpoint."

Reviews of this album were mixed, some noting that this was a well intended effort but which paled in comparison to the original 1940s recordings. Others still feel this was a fresher, more contemporary session with sharp high fidelity recording and crisp Sy Oliver arrangements, complemented by a more mature Sinatra but still with top control of his vocal abilities and smart interpretations.

== Track listing ==
1. "I'm Getting Sentimental Over You" (George Bassman, Ned Washington) – 3:42
2. "Imagination" (Johnny Burke, Jimmy Van Heusen) – 3:05
3. "There Are Such Things" (George W. Meyer, Stanley Adams, Abel Baer) – 3:13
4. "East of the Sun (And West of the Moon)" (Brooks Bowman) – 3:24
5. "Daybreak" (Ferde Grofe, Harold Adamson) – 2:43
6. "Without a Song" (Vincent Youmans, Billy Rose, Edward Eliscu) – 3:39
7. "I'll Be Seeing You" (Sammy Fain, Irving Kahal) – 2:49
8. "Take Me" (Rube Bloom, Mack David) – 2:19
9. "It's Always You" (Burke, Van Heusen) – 2:49
10. "Polka Dots and Moonbeams" (Burke, Van Heusen) – 3:43
11. "It Started All Over Again" (Carl T. Fischer, Bill Carey) – 2:32
12. "The One I Love (Belongs to Somebody Else)" (Isham Jones, Gus Kahn) – 2:48
13. "In the Blue of Evening" (Tom Montgomery, Tom Adair, Al D’Artega) – 4:03
14. "I'm Getting Sentimental Over You" (Reprise) – 0:49

"In the Blue of Evening" was added as a bonus track to the 1993 reissue, and is not available on the 1998 Entertainer of the Century remastered reissue.

== Personnel ==
- Frank Sinatra – vocals
- Sy Oliver – arranger, conductor
