= Cycles (Frank Sinatra album) =

Studio album by Frank Sinatra
- Released: November 1968
- Recorded: July 24 – November 14, 1968, New York City and Hollywood
- Genres: Traditional pop; easy listening; Pop rock; Jazz
- Length: 32:40
- Labels: Reprise; FS 1027
- Producer: Don Costa

Frank Sinatra chronology
The Sinatra Family Wish You a Merry Christmas (1968)	Cycles (1968)	My Way (1969)

Professional ratings
Review scores
Source	Rating
AllMusic	2/5 stars

Cycles is a studio album by American singer Frank Sinatra, released in 1968. The title song was written by Gayle Caldwell.

Released just before Christmas in 1968, there was a ten-month gap between the release of Francis A. & Edward K. and this album, which was the longest period in Sinatra's Reprise years in which he did not commercially record music (barring his contributions to The Sinatra Family Wish You a Merry Christmas).

Sinatra sang a variety of folk-rock oriented songs, including Judy Collins' hit "Both Sides Now" (written by Joni Mitchell) and the Glen Campbell hits "Gentle on My Mind" (written by John Hartford) and "By the Time I Get to Phoenix" (written by Jimmy Webb). The title song was released as a single, reaching #23 on the Billboard Hot 100 chart and #2 on the Easy Listening chart, while the album peaked at #18 on the Billboard 200 chart.

== Production ==
Cycles was recorded over four sessions in Los Angeles, primarily in November 1968. One session included 25 guests, including George Harrison, Pattie Boyd, and Tiny Tim.

As seen on the front cover, the song "Wait by the Fire" by Al Gorgoni and Chip Taylor was supposed to appear on the album, but Sinatra scrapped the song and substituted "My Way of Life" after the cover had already been printed.

== Track listing ==
1. "Rain in My Heart" (Teddy Randazzo, Victoria Pike) – 3:20
2. "From Both Sides, Now" (Joni Mitchell) – 2:55
3. "Little Green Apples" (Bobby Russell) – 5:00
4. "Pretty Colors" (Al Gorgoni, Chip Taylor) – 2:35
5. "Cycles" (Gayle Caldwell) – 3:07
6. "Wandering" (Caldwell) – 2:45
7. "By the Time I Get to Phoenix" (Jimmy Webb) – 3:55
8. "Moody River" (Gary D. Bruce) – 2:33
9. "My Way of Life" (Bert Kaempfert, Herb Rehbein, Carl Sigman) – 3:05
10. "Gentle on My Mind" (John Hartford) – 3:25

== Charts ==
Chart performance for Cycles
Chart (1968)	Peak position
Canada Top Albums/CDs (RPM)	9
US Billboard 200	18

== Certifications ==
Region	Certification	Certified units/sales
United States (RIAA)	Gold	500,000^{^}
^{^} Shipments figures based on certification alone.

== In popular culture ==
In 2022, the song "My Way of Life" was featured in the mid-credits scene of the Moon Knight episode "Gods and Monsters."
