= A Man Alone (album) =

Studio album by Frank Sinatra
- Released: August 1969
- Recorded: March 19–21, 1969, Hollywood
- Genres: Vocal jazz, traditional pop
- Length: 32:05
- Labels: Reprise; FS 1030
- Producer: Sonny Burke

Frank Sinatra chronology
My Way (1969)	A Man Alone (1969)	Watertown (1970)

A Man Alone: The Words and Music of McKuen is a 1969 studio album by American singer Frank Sinatra, arranged by Don Costa.

In a tribute to the poet, all songs on this album were written by Rod McKuen. "Love's Been Good to Me" reached No. 8 on the British charts, and was also notably recorded by Johnny Cash.

== Track listing ==
All songs written by Rod McKuen

1. "A Man Alone" – 3:47
2. "Night" (Spoken) – 2:25
3. "I've Been to Town" – 3:13
4. "From Promise to Promise" (Spoken) – 1:31
5. "The Single Man" – 3:01
6. "The Beautiful Strangers" – 2:41
7. "Lonesome Cities" – 3:18
8. "Love's Been Good to Me" – 3:27
9. "Empty Is" (Spoken) – 2:46
10. "Out Beyond the Window" (Spoken) – 2:45
11. "Some Traveling Music" (Spoken) – 2:36
12. "A Man Alone (Reprise)" – 1:30

== Personnel ==
- Frank Sinatra – Vocals
- Don Costa – Arranger, Conductor

== Reception ==
Billboard called the album "excellent", stating, "The chairman of the board wrings somberness out of McKuen's musical poetry with results that achieve a lyrical beauty of its own. Even when he's just talking to musical background, Sinatra creates a mood that is moving and sincere. The pathos he engenders is perfect fuel for the lyrics." In a retrospective review in AllMusic, Stephen Thomas Erlewine disagreed, stating, "A Man Alone was intended to be a serious statement, but much of it comes off as embarrassing posturing. McKuen's compositions are lyrically slight and musically insubstantial, but what saves A Man Alone from being a total failure is the conviction of Sinatra's performance, as well as Don Costa's skillful arrangements."
