= Strangers in the Night (Frank Sinatra album) =

1966 studio album by Frank Sinatra

Studio album by Frank Sinatra
- Released: May 30, 1966 (LP); October 6, 1986 (CD)
- Recorded: April 11 – May 16, 1966, Hollywood
- Genre: Traditional pop, vocal jazz
- Length: 27:10
- Label: Reprise; F 1017
- Producer: Jimmy Bowen

Frank Sinatra chronology
Moonlight Sinatra (1966)	Strangers in the Night (1966)	Sinatra at the Sands (1966)

Singles from Strangers in the Night
- 1. "Strangers in the Night" Released: 1966; 2. "Summer Wind" Released: 1966

Strangers in the Night: Deluxe Edition

Studio album by Frank Sinatra
- Released: January 26, 2010
- Recorded: April 11 – May 16, 1966, Hollywood; April 18, 1985, Budokan Hall, Tokyo, Japan
- Genre: Traditional pop, vocal jazz
- Length: 35:21
- Label: Concord
- Producer: Nelson Riddle, Sonny Burke

Strangers in the Night is a 1966 studio album by Frank Sinatra. It marked Sinatra's return to number one on the pop album charts in the mid-1960s, and consolidated the comeback he initiated in 1965. Combining pop hits with show tunes and standards, the album bridges classic jazz-oriented big band with contemporary pop. It became Sinatra's fifth and final album to reach number one on the US Pop Albums Chart. Additionally, the single "Strangers in the Night" reached number one on the pop single charts, while "Summer Wind" has become one of Sinatra best-known songs, making numerous film and television appearances in the years since its release.

At the Grammy Awards of 1967 Sinatra garnered two Grammys for his efforts on this album, including the Record of the Year for the title track, as well as Best Male Vocal Performance for the same song. (He also won a further Grammy that same year, the Album of the Year for A Man and His Music.) Ernie Freeman's arrangement of the title track won him the Grammy Award for Best Arrangement Accompanying a Vocalist or Instrumentalist, and Eddie Brackett and Lee Herschberg's engineering earned them the Grammy Award for Best Engineered Album, Non-Classical.

This is the final album Sinatra performed with long-time arranger/conductor Nelson Riddle and his orchestra.

Strangers in the Night has been certified platinum for one million copies sold in the US. Aside from his Christmas output, it remains Sinatra's only solo studio album to achieve this certification to date.

On 26 January 2010 the album was reissued as a "Deluxe Edition" which included three bonus tracks (two recorded tracks of "Strangers in the Night" and "All or Nothing at All" performed at the Budokan Hall from 1985, and an alternate take of "Yes Sir, That's My Baby"). In this 2010 version the audio channels are inverted.

Professional ratings
Review scores
Source	Rating
AllMusic (1966 original)	3.5/5 stars
Record Mirror	3/5 stars

== Track listing ==
Side One
No.	Title	Writer(s)	Length
1.	"Strangers in the Night" (From the Universal Picture "A Man Could Get Killed")	Bert Kaempfert, Charles Singleton, Eddie Snyder (arranged by Ernie Freeman)	2:35
2.	"Summer Wind"	Heinz Meier, Hans Bradtke, Johnny Mercer (arranged by Nelson Riddle)	2:53
3.	"All or Nothing at All"	Arthur Altman, Jack Lawrence (arranged by Riddle)	3:57
4.	"Call Me"	Tony Hatch (arranged by Riddle)	3:07
5.	"You're Driving Me Crazy!"	Walter Donaldson (arranged by Riddle)	2:15

Side Two
No.	Title	Writer(s)	Length
6.	"On a Clear Day (You Can See Forever)"	Alan Jay Lerner, Burton Lane (arranged by Riddle)	3:17
7.	"My Baby Just Cares for Me"	Donaldson, Gus Kahn (arranged by Riddle)	2:30
8.	"Downtown"	Hatch (arranged by Riddle)	2:14
9.	"Yes Sir, That's My Baby"	Donaldson, Kahn (arranged by Riddle)	2:08
10.	"The Most Beautiful Girl in the World"	Richard Rodgers, Lorenz Hart (arranged by Riddle)	2:24

Bonus tracks included on the 2010 reissue
No.	Title	Writer(s)	Length
11.	"Strangers in the Night" (Live at the Budokan Hall, Tokyo, Japan, April 18, 1985)	Bert Kaempfert, Charles Singleton, Eddie Snyder (arranged by Ernie Freeman)	2:14
12.	"All or Nothing at All" (Live at the Budokan Hall, Tokyo, Japan, April 18, 1985))	Arthur Altman, Jack Lawrence (arranged by Nelson Riddle)	3:40
13.	"Yes Sir, That's My Baby" (Alternate take)	Walter Donaldson, Gus Kahn (arranged by Riddle)	2:17

== Charts ==
Chart (1966)	Peak position
Italian Albums (HitParadeItalia)	1
Billboard Pop Albums (Billboard 200)	1

== Personnel ==
- Frank Sinatra – vocals
- The Nelson Riddle Orchestra
- Artie Kane – Hammond B3 organ
- Bill Miller – Piano (all tracks)
- Michel Rubini – Piano (1)
- Chuck Berghofer – Bass (1)
- Ralph Pena – Bass (2–10)
- Al Viola – Guitar (2–10)
- Al Casey, Bill Pitman, Glen Campbell, Tommy Tedesco – Guitar (1)
- Hal Blaine – Drums (1)
- Irving Cottler – Drums (2–10)

== Certifications, sales and awards ==
Region	Certification	Certified units/sales
Switzerland	—	40,000
United States (RIAA)	Platinum	1,000,000^{^}
^{^} Shipments figures based on certification alone.

Grammy Awards

Year			Result
1967	"Strangers in the Night"	Record of the Year	Won
1967	"Strangers in the Night"	Best Male Vocal Performance	Won
1967	"Strangers in the Night"	Best Arrangement, Instrumental and Vocals	Won
1967	"Strangers in the Night"	Best Engineered Album, Non-Classical	Won
