= Strangers in the Night =

1966 song by Bert Kaempfert

Single by Frank Sinatra

from the album Strangers in the Night
- B-side: "Oh, You Crazy Moon"
- Released: April 12, 1966
- Recorded: April 11, 1966
- Studio: United Western Recorders
- Genre: Traditional pop
- Length: 2:35
- Label: Reprise
- Composer: Bert Kaempfert
- Lyricists: Charles Singleton; Eddie Snyder
- Producer: Jimmy Bowen

Frank Sinatra singles chronology
"It Was a Very Good Year" (1965)	"Strangers in the Night" (1966)	"Summer Wind" (1966)

Audio sample
- file; help

"Strangers in the Night" is a song composed by Bert Kaempfert with English lyrics by Charles Singleton and Eddie Snyder. Kaempfert originally used it under the title "Beddy Bye" as part of the instrumental score for the movie A Man Could Get Killed. The song was made famous in 1966 by Frank Sinatra.

Sinatra's recording of the song reached No. 1 on both the Billboard Hot 100 chart and the Easy Listening chart, and it was also simultaneously a No. 1 on the UK Singles Chart. The success of the song led to the release of the album Strangers in the Night which included the title song. This release became Sinatra's most commercially successful album.

Sinatra's recording won him the Grammy Award for Best Male Pop Vocal Performance and the Grammy Award for Record of the Year, as well as a Grammy Award for Best Arrangement Accompanying a Vocalist or Instrumentalist for Ernie Freeman at the Grammy Awards of 1967.

== Origin ==
The song was originally an instrumental theme tune from the soundtrack of the film A Man Could Get Killed written by German composer Bert Kaempfert. Part of the melody could be heard in the orchestral title song of the film as well as the end credits. Music publisher Hal Fine played some tracks from the film to Frank Sinatra's producer Jimmy Bowen, and Bowen indicated that Sinatra would record the theme tune titled "Beddy Bye" if lyrics were written for the song, and that the title needed to be changed.

The writing of the lyrics, however, took a few months. Two sets of lyrics were produced but both were rejected. Lyrics were then added by Charles Singleton and Eddie Snyder, which were accepted. To write the lyrics, Singleton and Snyder took cue from the film where the principal actors James Garner and Melina Mercouri exchanged glances at a bar and became lovers by the end of the film. Snyder suggested that he also had a hand in writing the music, and that he, Singleton and Kaempfert spent two weeks perfecting the song. The song was said originally to have been intended for Melina Mercouri, who thought that a man's vocals would better suit the melody and therefore declined to sing it.

== Contested authorship ==
A number of people have claimed authorship of the song.

In an interview with The New York Times, Avo Uvezian discussed the origins of "Strangers in the Night", saying that he had composed the melody while he was in New York. He was introduced to Frank Sinatra via a mutual friend, and he presented to Sinatra the tune he composed titled "Broken Guitar" with lyrics written by someone else. Sinatra liked the tune but did not like the lyrics, and asked that they be rewritten. Studio songwriters were engaged to produce new lyrics, but Sinatra was said to hate the new lyrics, and announced: "I don't want to sing this." However, he was later persuaded to record the song as "Strangers in the Night".

Uvezian said that Kaempfert was a friend of his, and before he had shown Sinatra the song, he had sent it to Kaempfert for publication in Germany. The melody was used in the film A Man Could Get Killed, but with Kaempfert credited as the sole composer. Uvezian said that he was acknowledged by Kaempfert to be the composer of the song multiple times, including in a written letter.

The Croatian singer Ivo Robić is also said to be the original author of "Strangers in the Night", which he sold to Kaempfert. In an interview on Croatian TV with Croatian composer Stjepan Mihaljinec, Robić said that he had composed a song "Ta ljetna noć" (That Summer Night) as an entry to the Split Festival in the former Yugoslavia, where it was rejected. He sang a first few bars from that song that were identical to "Strangers in the Night". Robić then sold the rights of this song to Kaempfert, who used it in the film. Kaempfert later gave the German version of the song, "Fremde in der Nacht", for Robić to record. Robić is not credited as a songwriter in his 1966 German recording of the song, nor his Croatian version titled "Stranci u noći" released the same year by the Yugoslav record company Jugoton.

In 1967, French composer Michel Philippe-Gérard (more commonly known as Philippe-Gérard) claimed that the melody of "Strangers" was based on his composition "Magic Tango", which was published in 1953 through Chappell & Co. in New York. Royalties from the song were thus frozen until a court in Paris ruled in 1971 that there was no plagiarism, stating that many songs were based on "similar constant factors".

== Recording and release ==
A number of artists recorded the song before Frank Sinatra, including Bobby Darin who recorded the song on March 23, 1966, Jack Jones on April 8, as well as Al Martino. Bowen, Sinatra's producer, however, was unaware that Fine had given the song for others to record, and was surprised when he came across Jones who informed him that he would be recording the song and that it would be released within days. Bowen quickly contacted Ernie Freeman to come up with an arrangement for Frank Sinatra to record "Strangers in the Night" to beat Jones to the song's release.

Bowen already had booked a session at the United Western Recorders on Sunset Boulevard with a 35-piece orchestra for 7–10 pm, on April 11, 1966. The studio session was originally intended for Dean Martin to record songs for an album including "Let the Good Times In", and Bowen asked Martin to come in an hour later as Martin tended to record quickly. Hal Blaine was the drummer at the recording; according to Blaine, he reused the drum beat from "Be My Baby" by the Ronettes in a slower and softer arrangement. Also present among the musicians was Glen Campbell, who was brought in the last minute to play rhythm guitar in his first session with Sinatra. As Campbell could not read sheet music, he spent the first take listening to the melody instead of playing, which prompted Sinatra to yell out at him if he was sleeping.

One of the most memorable and recognizable features of the record is Sinatra's scat improvisation of the melody (on take two) with the syllables "doo-be-doo-be-doo" as the song fades to the end. For the CD Nothing but the Best, the song was remastered and the running time is 2:45 instead of the usual 2:35. The extra ten seconds is just a continuation of Sinatra's scat singing.

The song features a half-tone key change around 2/3 of the way into song, which created a problem when Sinatra could not adjust to the key change. According to Bowen, he resolved the issue by asking Sinatra to sing until the just before the key change, stopped, then gave him a bell tone so he could sing the next section in the new key.

Sinatra arrived at 8 pm and the recording was completed by 9 pm. Bowen then spent the night splicing the two parts of the recording together, before mixing and mastering the tape. The following day, couriers with the recording by Sinatra in acetate that gave the highest quality sound flew out by plane and delivered the record to radio stations in all top 50 markets to play before Jones' recording arrived.

Due to the rush-release of Sinatra's record, Jones' version failed to chart. Jones' recording became instead the B-side to "The Impossible Dream", which followed Sinatra's "Strangers in the Night" as No. 1 on the Easy Listening (AC) chart. Darin's recording was never released, while Martino was out of the country and could not promote the song when Sinatra's version was released.

== Reception ==
The song first entered Billboard Hot 100 on chart dated May 7, 1966, reaching No. 1 on July 2, 1966, in the US. It also reached the top of the Easy Listening chart, where it was No. 1 for seven weeks. It also reached No. 1 in seven other countries, including the UK for three weeks.

The single sold 60,000 copies in Brazil, 600,000 copies in France, combined it sold a million copies in United States and United Kingdom and over 2 million worldwide.

"Strangers in the Night" was Sinatra's first number one on the Hot 100 in 11 years and it remained on the charts for 15 weeks. Sinatra, however, despised the song, calling it at one time "a piece of shit" and "the worst fucking song that I have ever heard." Joe Smith, then head of Reprise Records, said "[Sinatra] thought it was about two fags in a bar!" Dean Martin had teased Sinatra when the song was being released, saying that he turned down the song because "it's about two faggots". In concert, Sinatra had on many occasions sung the lines "Love was just a glance away, a warm embracing dance away" as "a lonesome pair of pants away".

The song received the Grammy Award for Best Male Pop Vocal Performance and the Grammy Award for Record of the Year, as well as a Grammy Award for Best Arrangement Accompanying a Vocalist or Instrumentalist for Ernie Freeman at the Grammy Awards of 1967. It also received the award for best original song at the 24th Golden Globe Awards.

=== Legacy ===
In 2008, "Strangers in the Night" was inducted into the Grammy Hall of Fame.

The name of cartoon dog character Scooby-Doo is derived from the scat in the song. CBS television executive Fred Silverman listened to the song in 1968 while on a red-eye flight to a development meeting for Scooby-Doo, Where Are You! and was inspired by the scat.

== Charts ==
=== Weekly chart ===
Charts (1966)	Peak position
Argentinian Singles Chart	1
Australian Singles Chart	1
Austria (Ö3 Austria Top 40)	1
Belgium (Ultratop 50 Flanders)	1
Belgium (Ultratop 50 Wallonia)	1
Brazilian Singles Chart	1
Canada Top Singles (RPM)	3
Danish Singles Chart (DGGIF)	6
French Singles Chart	1
Greek Singles Chart	6
Hong Kong Singles Chart	5
Ireland (IRMA)	1
Israeli Singles Chart	3
Italian Singles Chart (Musica e Dischi)	1
Mexican Singles Chart (Audiomusica)	3
Netherlands (Dutch Top 40)	2
New Zealand (Listener)	8
Norway (VG-lista)	5
Philippines Singles Chart	1
Singapore Singles Chart	9
Spanish Singles Chart	1
Swiss Singles Chart	1
UK Singles (Official Charts)	1
US Billboard Hot 100	1
US Adult Contemporary (Billboard)	1
West Germany (GfK)	1

=== Year-end charts ===
Chart (1966)	Rank
Australia (AMR)	11
Austria (Ö3 Austria Top 40)	1
Belgium (Ultratop 50 Flanders)	1
Canada (CHUM)	39
Canada (RPM)	25
Netherlands (Dutch Top 40)	3
Japan Foreign Hits (Billboard)	5
South Africa	3
UK Singles	2
US Billboard Hot 100	8
US Cashbox	4

== Certifications ==
Region	Certification	Certified units/sales
United Kingdom (BPI)	Silver	200,000^{‡}
^{‡} Sales+streaming figures based on certification alone.

== Personnel ==
According to the AFM contract sheet, the following musicians played on the track.

- Bill Miller and Michel Rubini - pianos
- Al Casey, Bill Pitman, Glen Campbell and Tommy Tedesco - guitars
- Chuck Berghofer - bass
- Hal Blaine - drums
- Emil Richards and Eddie Brackett Jr. - percussion
- Sid Sharp, Leonard Malarsky, William Kurasch, Ralph Schaeffer, Israel Baker, Arnold Belnick, Jerome Reisler, Robert Sushel, John DeVoogt, Bernard Kundell, Tibor Zelig, Gerald Vinci, William Weiss, James Getzoff, Harry Bluestone and Victor Arno - violins
- Harry Hyams, Joseph DiFiore, Darrel Terwilliger and Alexander Neiman - violas
- Joseph Saxon, Jesse Ehrlich, Emmet Sargeant and Armand Kaproff - cellos
- Vincent DeRosa, Henry Sigismonti, Gale Robinson and Richard Perissi - French horns
- Bill Green and Andreas Kostelas - flutes

== Other versions ==
Around 200 versions of the song had been released by 1967. Kaempfert himself released an instrumental version soon after Sinatra's version was released, and it reached No. 8 on the AC chart. Bette Midler released a version in 1976, which reached No. 45 on the AC chart. Gerry And The Pacemakers released a version in 1966 on their album Girl On A Swing.
