= My Way (Frank Sinatra album) =

1969 album by Frank Sinatra

Studio album by Frank Sinatra
- Released: March 1969
- Recorded: December 30, 1968, February 18, 20, 24, 1969
- Studio: Western Studio A in Hollywood, Los Angeles
- Genres: Traditional pop, vocal jazz
- Length: 32:54
- Labels: Reprise; FS 1029
- Producers: Don Costa, Sonny Burke

Frank Sinatra chronology
Cycles (1968)	My Way (1969)	A Man Alone (1969)

Singles from My Way
- 1. "My Way" Released: March 1969

Professional ratings
Review scores
Source	Rating
Allmusic	3/5 stars
Mojo	3/5 stars

My Way: 40th Anniversary Edition

Studio album by Frank Sinatra
- Released: May 5, 2009
- Recorded: December 30, 1968, February 18, 20, 24, 1969, Hollywood, Los Angeles, August 13, 1969, NBC Studio 2, Burbank, California, October 24, 1987, Reunion Arena, Dallas, Texas
- Genres: Traditional pop, vocal jazz
- Length: 40:14
- Label: Concord
- Producers: Don Costa, Sonny Burke

Professional ratings
Review scores
Source	Rating
Allmusic	3/5 stars

My Way is an album by American singer Frank Sinatra, released in 1969 on his own Reprise label.

The album is mainly a collection of then-contemporary pop songs, such as Simon and Garfunkel's "Mrs. Robinson", and The Beatles' "Yesterday", French songs such as "If You Go Away", and the anthemic title song "My Way", which effectively became Sinatra's theme song in this stage of his career.

On December 30, 1968 in Los Angeles, a few hours before going to celebrate the New Year 1969, at the Sands Casino from Las Vegas, My Way was recorded and mixed at EastWest Studios, then called Western Recorders. Later it was remixed and reissued by Concord Records in 2009 to mark its 40th anniversary. Two bonus tracks were included, and new liner notes from Bono. The bonus tracks were a rehearsal of "For Once in My Life" from 1969, for Sinatra's eponymous Emmy Award nominated 1969 television special, Sinatra, and a live 1987 performance of "My Way" at the Reunion Arena, Dallas, Texas.

Bono's liner notes had previously appeared as his New York Times Op-ed column on January 9, 2009. The article discussed Bono's personal relationship with Sinatra, and Sinatra's thoughts on Miles Davis. Bono also mused on Sinatra's performances of "My Way", and the new year.

== Track listing ==
=== Standard edition ===
1. "Watch What Happens" (Norman Gimbel, Michel Legrand, Jacques Demy) – 2:17
2. "Didn't We?" (Jimmy Webb) – 2:55
3. "Hallelujah, I Love Her So" (Ray Charles) – 2:47
4. "Yesterday" (Lennon–McCartney) – 3:56
5. "All My Tomorrows" (Sammy Cahn, Jimmy Van Heusen) – 4:35
6. "My Way" (Paul Anka, Claude François, Jacques Revaux, Gilles Thibault) – 4:35
7. "A Day in the Life of a Fool" (Luiz Bonfá, Carl Sigman) – 3:00
8. "For Once in My Life" (Ron Miller, Orlando Murden) – 2:50
9. "If You Go Away" (Jacques Brel, Rod McKuen) – 3:30
10. "Mrs. Robinson" (Paul Simon) – 2:55

=== 2009 Concord bonus tracks ===
1. "For Once in My Life" – 4:11 studio rehearsal, NBC Studio 2, Burbank, California, August 13, 1969
2. "My Way" – 3:09 live performance at the Reunion Arena, Dallas, Texas, October 24, 1987

=== 2019 Capitol bonus tracks ===
11. "My Way" – 4:23 Duet with Willie Nelson
12. "My Way" – 3:32 Duet with Luciano Pavarotti
13. "My Way" – 4:36 Live at the Ahmanson Theatre, June 13, 1971
14. "My Way" – 3:43 Live at Reunion Arena, October 24, 1987

== Charts ==
Chart performance for My Way
Chart (1969)	Peak position
Canada Top Albums/CDs (RPM)	9
UK Albums (Official Charts)	2
US Billboard 200	11

== Certifications ==
Region	Certification	Certified units/sales
Australia (ARIA)	3× Platinum	210,000^{^}
Germany (BVMI)	Gold	250,000^{^}
United States (RIAA)	Gold	500,000^{^}
^{^} Shipments figures based on certification alone.
