= Trilogy: Past Present Future =

Studio album by Frank Sinatra
- Released: March 26, 1980
- Recorded: July 17 – December 18, 1979
- Studios: United Western (Hollywood); Columbia (New York City); Shrine Auditorium (Los Angeles)
- Genres: Traditional pop; jazz
- Length: 106:11
- Labels: Reprise; 3 FS 2330
- Producer: Sonny Burke

Frank Sinatra chronology
Sinatra–Jobim Sessions (1974)	Trilogy: Past Present Future (1980)	She Shot Me Down (1981)

Trilogy: Past Present Future (or simply Trilogy) is the fifty-fifth studio album by American singer Frank Sinatra, released in March 1980 through Reprise. The triple album included his last top 40 hit, "Theme from New York, New York".

== Album concept ==
Each of the album's three records was conceived as an individual work portraying a different time epoch, and each was arranged by one of Sinatra's major collaborators: Billy May (The Past), Don Costa (The Present), and Gordon Jenkins (The Future). Nelson Riddle also contributed the arrangement of "Something" for The Present.

For "The Past," Sinatra recorded standards for the first time since the early 1960s: "The Song Is You," "It Had to Be You," "All of You". "The Present" concentrates on pop hits like "Love Me Tender", "Something", "Song Sung Blue", "MacArthur Park", and "Just the Way You Are". Stephen Thomas Erlewine's review described "The Future" as "a mess", although it was also called "ambitious, experimental, and self-referential — more of a freeform suite than a set of songs".

== Reception ==
Professional ratings
Review scores
Source	Rating
AllMusic	2/5 stars

Trilogy: Past Present Future peaked at No. 17 on the Billboard 200.

At the Grammy Awards of 1981, Trilogy: Past Present Future was nominated for the Grammy Award for Album of the Year, and Sinatra's recording of "Theme from New York, New York" was nominated for the Grammy Award for Record of the Year, Grammy Award for Best Male Pop Vocal Performance and the Grammy Award for Song of the Year. It won the Grammy Award for Best Album Notes.

On his WNEW-AM show, Jonathan Schwartz described the "Future" suite that forms the final part of this album as "narcissistic" and "a shocking embarrassment". Sinatra rang to complain, and had Schwartz suspended from his job.

Writing for Billboard in 2015, Bruce Handy said, "35 years after its March 1980 release, in this, the year of Sinatra's 100th birthday, it remains one of the most ambitious, strange, brilliant and bloated albums of his or any other artist's body of work."

== Track listing ==
=== "The Past" ===
Arranged by Billy May

Side One:

1. "The Song Is You" (Jerome Kern, Oscar Hammerstein II) – 2:39
2. "But Not for Me" (George Gershwin, Ira Gershwin) – 3:50
3. "I Had the Craziest Dream" (Mack Gordon, Harry Warren) – 3:13
4. "It Had to Be You" (Isham Jones, Gus Kahn) – 3:53
5. "Let's Face the Music and Dance" (Irving Berlin) – 2:50

Side Two:

1. "Street of Dreams" (Sam M. Lewis, Victor Young) – 3:32
2. "My Shining Hour" (Harold Arlen, Johnny Mercer) – 3:21
3. "All of You" (Cole Porter) – 1:42
4. "More Than You Know" (Billy Rose, Edward Eliscu, Vincent Youmans) – 3:22
5. "They All Laughed" (George Gershwin, Ira Gershwin) – 2:49

=== "The Present" ===
Arranged by Don Costa, except "Something" arranged by Nelson Riddle

Side Three:

1. "You and Me (We Wanted It All)" (Carole Bayer Sager, Peter Allen) – 4:07
2. "Just the Way You Are" (Billy Joel) – 3:26
3. "Something" (George Harrison) – 4:42
4. "MacArthur Park" (Jimmy Webb) – 2:45
5. "Theme from New York, New York" (Fred Ebb, John Kander) – 3:26

Side Four:

1. "Summer Me, Winter Me" (Alan and Marilyn Bergman, Michel Legrand) – 4:02
2. "Song Sung Blue" (Neil Diamond) – 2:47
3. "For the Good Times" with Eileen Farrell (Kris Kristofferson) – 4:41
4. "Love Me Tender" (Vera Matson, Elvis Presley) – 3:34
5. "That's What God Looks Like to Me" (Lois Irwin, Lan O'Kun) – 2:55

=== "The Future" ===
All songs written, arranged and conducted by Gordon Jenkins

Side Five:

1. "What Time Does the Next Miracle Leave?" – 10:44
  - Soprano solo by Diana Lee
  - Narration by Jerry Whitman
2. "World War None!" – 4:27
3. "The Future" – 4:05
  - Alto solo by Beverly Jenkins

Side Six:

1. "The Future" (Continued): "I've Been There!" – 3:33
2. "The Future" (Conclusion): "Song Without Words" – 6:00
  - Soprano solo by Loulie Jean Norman
  - Alto solo by Beverly Jenkins
3. "Finale: Before the Music Ends" – 9:46

== Charts ==
Chart (1980)	Peak position
Australia (Kent Music Report)	62

== Certifications ==
Region	Certification	Certified units/sales
United States (RIAA)	Gold	500,000^{^}
^{^} Shipments figures based on certification alone.

== Personnel ==
- Frank Sinatra - vocals
- Sonny Burke - producer
- Billy May - arranger, conductor (section "The Past")
- Don Costa - arranger, conductor (section "The Present")
- Gordon Jenkins - arranger, conductor (section "The Future")
