= Arthur Johnston (composer) =

American composer, conductor, pianist and arrange (1898–1954)

- Born: Arthur James Johnston; January 10, 1898; New York City, U.S.
- Died: May 1, 1954 (aged 56) Corona del Mar, California, U.S.
- Genres: Traditional pop
- Occupations: Composer, arranger
- Instrument: Piano
- Years active: 1914–c.1950

Arthur James Johnston (January 10, 1898 – May 1, 1954) was an American composer, conductor, pianist and arranger.

== Life and career ==
Born in New York City, he began playing piano in movie houses, and went to work for Fred Fisher's music publishing company at the age of 16. He met, and was soon hired by, Irving Berlin, becoming Berlin's personal arranger, and director of early Music Box Revues. His first hit song was "Mandy Make Up Your Mind", co-written with George W. Meyer, Roy Turk and Grant Clarke for Florence Mills to sing in the show Dixie to Broadway.

In 1929, he moved to Hollywood, where he orchestrated and arranged the music for films including Puttin' On the Ritz and Charlie Chaplin's City Lights. He worked with Sam Coslow on such songs as "Just One More Chance" (1932) and "Cocktails for Two" (1934). He became closely associated with Bing Crosby, writing songs for the films College Humor (1933), Too Much Harmony (1933), and Pennies From Heaven (1936), the first film on which he worked with lyricist Johnny Burke. Johnston and Burke were nominated for an Academy Award for Best Original Song in 1936 for the song "Pennies From Heaven".

He visited Britain in 1938, writing the music for the Jessie Matthews film Sailing Along, and served in the US Army in World War II. After returning to Hollywood, he wrote for movies including the title song from Song of the South (1947). He was a member of the Songwriters Hall of Fame.

He died in Corona del Mar, California, in 1954, aged 56.

== Notable songs ==
- "Moon Song (That Wasn't Meant For Me)"—lyrics by Sam Coslow
- "Black Moonlight"—lyrics by Sam Coslow
- "Cocktails for Two"—lyrics by Sam Coslow
- "Sweet Lotus Blossom"—lyrics by Sam Coslow
- "My Old Flame"—lyrics by Sam Coslow
- "Pennies From Heaven"—lyrics by Johnny Burke
- "One, Two, Button Your Shoe"—lyrics by Johnny Burke
- "The Moon Got in My Eyes"—lyrics by Johnny Burke
