= Sinatra: World On a String =

Live album by Frank Sinatra
- Released: October 16, 2016
- Recorded: June 14, 1958 at the Monte-Carlo Sporting Club, Monte Carlo, Monaco; May 20, 1953 at the RAI Radio Club, Italy; December 2, 1961 at Sydney Stadium, Sydney, Australia; April 21, 1962 at Hibiya Park, in Tokyo, Japan; September 27, 1979 at the Giza pyramid complex, near Cairo, Egypt; August 20, 1982 at the Altos de Chavón, La Romana, Dominican Republic
- Genres: Traditional pop; jazz
- Length: 4:50:00
- Label: Universal
- Producers: Charles Pignone, Robert Finkelstein

Frank Sinatra chronology
Ultimate Sinatra (2015)	Sinatra: World On a String (2016)	Ultimate Christmas (2017)

Sinatra: World On a String is a 2016 box set album of live performances by the American singer Frank Sinatra, recorded in Italy in 1953, Monaco in 1958, Sydney in 1961, Cairo in 1979, and the Dominican Republic in 1982. The performances are chronicled on four compact discs with a further DVD of a 1962 concert in Tokyo with short films and Italian chocolate adverts featuring Sinatra during his world tour of 1962.

The album continues a series of live box sets of unreleased Sinatra concerts following Sinatra: Vegas (2006), Sinatra: New York (2009), and Sinatra: London (2014).

== Reception ==
Wade Tatangelo, reviewing the set for the Sarasota Herald-Tribune, described the set as "every bit as rewarding" as Sinatra: Vegas and Sinatra: New York and wrote of the Monaco concert that "...Sinatra never sounded better in the studio or on stage than he did in the late 1950s and this concert is a perfectly-paced treasure". Tatangelo noted the decline in Sinatra's voice by the time of the 1979 concert in Egypt, but felt that by the 1982 concert in the Dominican Republic, Sinatra sounded "...just as good, maybe even better, than he did during the 1979 set" and highlighted his performance of "Send in the Clowns" with "sparse, sublime accompaniment" from the guitarist Tony Mottola.

In their review of the set, Broadway World commented that "Listening to the nearly 30-year span of performances, it's remarkable to realize how the passage of time never diminished Sinatra's way with a song; if anything, it deepened his understanding of his material. Comparing renditions of "Bewitched" from 1958 and 1979 reveals a more pronounced resonance in Sinatra's delivery".

== Track listing ==
=== Disc one ===
Recorded at the Monte-Carlo Sporting Club, Monte Carlo, Monaco, June 14, 1958; tracks 18–25 originally broadcast on the RAI Radio Club on May 20, 1953:

1. Introduction by Noël Coward – 2:52
2. "Play On: Clarke Street" (Elmer Bernstein) – 0:28
3. "Come Fly with Me" (Sammy Cahn, Jimmy Van Heusen) – 2:45
4. "I Get a Kick Out of You" (Cole Porter) – 3:01
5. "I've Got You Under My Skin" (Porter) – 1:53
6. "Where or When" (Lorenz Hart, Richard Rodgers) – 2:19
7. "Moonlight in Vermont" (John Blackburn, Karl Suessdorf) – 2:17
8. "On the Road to Mandalay" (Rudyard Kipling, Oley Speaks) – 2:36
9. "When Your Lover Has Gone" (Einar Aaron Swan) – 3:06
10. "April in Paris" (Vernon Duke, E.Y. "Yip" Harburg) – 2:26
11. "All the Way" (Cahn, Van Heusen) – 2:52
12. "Monique" (Bernstein, Cahn) – 3:22
13. "Bewitched" (Hart, Rodgers) – 3:28
14. "The Lady Is a Tramp" (Hart, Rodgers) – 3:04
15. Play-off: "(Love Is) The Tender Trap" (Cahn, Van Heusen) – 0:54
16. "You Make Me Feel So Young" (Mack Gordon, Josef Myrow) – 3:11
17. Bows: "(Love Is) The Tender Trap" – 0:43
18. Radio Club Introduction – 0:54
19. Welcome and Greetings – 4:49
20. "September Song" (Maxwell Anderson, Kurt Weill) – 2:44
21. Presentation and Announcements – 6:18
22. "Laura" (Johnny Mercer) – 2:13
23. Baseball Segment – 2:21
24. "Ninna Nanna" (Domenico Modugno) – 2:51
25. "Night and Day" (Porter) – 3:12
26. Closing Remarks – 3:23

=== Disc two ===
Recorded at Sydney Stadium, Sydney, Australia, December 2, 1961:

1. Introduction by Tommy Hanlon Jr. – 0:53
2. "I've Got the World on a String" (Harold Arlen, Ted Koehler) – 2:13
3. "I Concentrate on You" (Porter) – 2:16
4. "Night and Day" – 2:31
5. "Moonlight in Vermont" – 3:25
6. "In the Still of the Night" (Porter) – 3:39
7. "I'll Be Seeing You" (Sammy Fain, Irving Kahal) – 2:20
8. "Day In, Day Out" (Rube Bloom, Mercer) – 2:36
9. "The Moon Was Yellow (And the Night Was Young)" (Fred E. Ahlert, Edgar Leslie) – 2:56
10. "You're Nobody 'Til Somebody Loves You" (James Cavanaugh, Russ Morgan, Larry Stock) – 3:46
11. Monologue – 5:33
12. "Come Fly with Me" – 2:38
13. "April in Paris" – 2:36
14. "A Foggy Day" (George Gershwin, Ira Gershwin) – 2:20
15. "Without a Song" (Edward Eliscu, Billy Rose, Vincent Youmans) – 3:51
16. "Imagination" (Johnny Burke, Van Heusen) – 2:58
17. "The Second Time Around" (Cahn, Van Heusen) – 4:37
18. "Young at Heart" (Carolyn Leigh, Johnny Richards) – 2:15
19. "Witchcraft" (Cy Coleman, Leigh) – 1:50
20. "Embraceable You" (G. Gershwin, I. Gershwin) – 3:03
21. "The One I Love (Belongs to Somebody Else)" (Isham Jones, Gus Kahn) – 3:04
22. "My Funny Valentine" (Hart, Rodgers) – 3:09
23. "My Blue Heaven" (Walter Donaldson, George A. Whiting) – 2:21
24. "Angel Eyes" (Earl Brent, Matt Dennis) – 3:43
25. "One for My Baby (And One More for the Road)" (Arlen, Mercer) – 4:46
26. "The Lady Is a Tramp" – 4:27

=== Disc three ===
Recorded at the Giza pyramid complex, near Cairo, Egypt, September 27, 1979:

1. Introduction by Jehan Sadat – 2:08
2. "The Song Is You" (Oscar Hammerstein II, Jerome Kern) – 3:02
3. "Where or When" (Hart, Rodgers) – 2:12
4. "The Lady Is a Tramp" – 2:39
5. "Someone to Watch over Me" (G. Gershwin, I. Gershwin) – 2:55
6. "Something" (George Harrison) – 4:19
7. "My Kind of Town" (Cahn, Van Heusen) – 2:58
8. "All the Way" – 2:23
9. "Bewitched" – 3:28
10. "I've Got You Under My Skin" – 2:55
11. Medley: "The Gal That Got Away"/"It Never Entered My Mind" (Arlen, I. Gershwin)/(Hart, Rodgers) – 5:44
12. Monologue – 5:48
13. "Try a Little Tenderness" (Jimmy Campbell, Reg Connelly, Harry M. Woods) – 3:34
14. "Strangers in the Night" (Bert Kaempfert, Charles Singleton, Eddie Snyder) – 1:38
15. "Street of Dreams" (Sam M. Lewis, Victor Young) – 2:08
16. "April in Paris" – 2:51
17. "Theme from New York, New York" (Fred Ebb, John Kander) – 3:44
18. "My Way" (Paul Anka, Claude François, Jacques Revaux) – 3:42
19. Bows: "My Way" – 2:29
20. Closing Comments – 0:21

=== Disc four ===
Recorded at the Concert for the Americas at the Altos de Chavón, La Romana, Dominican Republic, August 20, 1982:

1. "I've Got the World on a String" – 2:58
2. "I Get a Kick Out of You" – 4:30
3. "Come Rain or Come Shine" (Arlen, Mercer) – 3:57
4. "When Your Lover Has Gone" – 3:02
5. "The Lady Is a Tramp" – 3:51
6. "The House I Live In" (Lewis Allan, Earl Robinson) – 5:46
7. "Searching" (Cahn, Jule Styne) – 3:55
8. "My Kind of Town" – 3:49
9. "Something" – 5:05
10. "The Best Is Yet to Come" (Cy Coleman, Leigh) – 3:29
11. "Strangers in the Night" – 2:28
12. "All or Nothing at All" (Arthur Altman, Jack Lawrence) – 4:04
13. Introduction of Musicians – 1:54
14. Medley: "The Gal That Got Away"/"It Never Entered My Mind" – 6:52
15. "I've Got You Under My Skin" – 4:19
16. "Send in the Clowns" (Stephen Sondheim) – 4:11
17. "Quiet Nights of Quiet Stars (Corcovado)" (Antonio Carlos Jobim, Gene Lees) – 3:47
18. "I Won't Dance" (Dorothy Fields, Otto Harbach, Hammerstein, Kern, Jimmy McHugh) – 3:59
19. Buddy Rich Band Introduction – 0:31
20. "Theme from New York, New York" – 4:23
21. Bows: "Theme from New York, New York" – 2:24

=== Disc five (DVD) ===
Recorded at Hibiya Park, in Tokyo, Japan, April 21, 1962:

1. Introduction
2. "Too Marvelous for Words" (Mercer, Richard A. Whiting)
3. "Imagination"
4. "Moonlight in Vermont"
5. "Day in, Day Out"
6. "Without a Song"
7. "The Moon Was Yellow (And the Night Was Young)"
8. "I've Got You Under My Skin"
9. "I Get a Kick Out of You"
10. "At Long Last Love" (Porter)
11. "My Funny Valentine"
12. "In the Still of the Night"
13. "Embraceable You"
14. "Night and Day"
15. "April in Paris"
16. "The Lady Is a Tramp"
17. Bows
18. Monologue and Band Introductions
19. "All the Way"
20. "Chicago (That Toddlin' Town)" (Fred Fisher)
21. "I Could Have Danced All Night" (Alan Jay Lerner, Frederick Loewe)
22. Closing Bows
23. Frank Sinatra with All God's Children, 1962
24. Sinatra in Israel, 1962

Perguina Commercials, 1962:

1. "Night and Day"
2. "My Funny Valentine"
3. "I've Got You Under My Skin"
4. "Moonlight in Vermont"
5. "I Love Paris" (Porter)
6. "Come Fly with Me"
7. "My Blue Heaven"
8. "Chicago (That Toddlin' Town)"
9. "Imagination"
10. "Witchcraft"
11. "A Foggy Day"
12. "The Lady Is a Tramp"

== Personnel ==
- Frank Sinatra – vocals
- Billy Byers, Billy May, Don Costa, Ernie Freeman, Gordon Jenkins, Neal Hefti, Nelson Riddle, Quincy Jones – arranger
- Domenico Modugno – vocals, guitar, on "Ninna Nanna"
- Tony Mottola – guitar
- Bill Miller – piano, arranger, liner notes
- Buddy Rich big band

=== Production ===
- Al Viola, Frank Sinatra Jr., George B. Honchar, Hank Cattaneo, Ron Anthony – liner notes
- Vartan – art direction
- Leon Smith – audio restoration
- Herman Leonard – cover photo
- Andy Engel – design
- Robert Finkelstein – executive producer
- Larry Walsh – mastering engineer
- Xilonen Oreshnick – photo coordination
- Charles Pignone – producer, liner notes
- Ute Friesleben – production manager
- Frank Collura, Liuba Shapiro – product manager
