= Winter Symphony =

Winter Symphony may refer to:

- Winter Symphony (song), a song by the Beach Boys
- Winter Symphony (album), a 2015 album by Jennifer Thomas
- A Winter Symphony, a 2008 album by Sarah Brightman
