= Johnny Pearson =

- Born: John Valmore Pearson; 18 June 1925; Plaistow, London Borough of Newham, England
- Died: 20 March 2011 (aged 85)
- Genres: Pop, jazz, easy listening
- Occupations: Arranger; songwriter; pianist; orchestra leader
- Instrument: Piano
- Years active: 1945–2005
- Labels: Parlophone; Oriole; Pye; Penny Farthing; Page One; KPM; Bruton
- Formerly of: Sounds Orchestral

John Valmore Pearson (18 June 1925 – 20 March 2011) was a British composer, orchestra leader and pianist. He led the Top of the Pops orchestra for sixteen years, wrote a catalogue of library music, and had many of his pieces used as the theme music to television series.

== Early years ==
Johnny Pearson was born John Valmore Pearson in Plaistow in Kent, the only child of a steel erector. At age seven, Pearson began studying piano. By nine, he had won a scholarship with the London Academy of Music, where he spent four years under English pianist Solomon. However, at the outbreak of war and with the end of his scholarship he was put into trade, and embarked on a seven-year toolmaking apprenticeship, much of it at the Siemens Brothers factory in Charlton.

In his teens, Pearson gave classical recitals and started a jazz band, the Rhythm Makers. During World War II, Johnny Pearson served in the Royal Artillery Band. After the war, he became one of the founding members of the Malcolm Mitchell Trio in October 1948, before leaving in 1954 after Malcolm Mitchell broke up the group to start a solo career. During his time with the trio, Johnny Pearson toured England and Europe, playing the West End and theatres. The early Malcolm Mitchell Trio consisted of Malcolm Mitchell, Teddy Broughton and Johnny Pearson.

After leaving the Malcolm Mitchell Trio, Pearson turned his talents to British radio, as well as performing in the Peter York Concert Orchestra. By 1960, he was conducting the Romance in Rhythm Orchestra. He recorded two singles for Parlophone, "Waterfall" in mid 1959, and "Theme from The L Shaped Room" in 1962. He was then offered a solo album deal with Oriole Records, which first teamed him up with John Schroeder. The Oriole album, Piano Sweet - Piano Wild was released in 1962 and was Johnny Pearson's first full vinyl album release. Also there was a 45 single released, "Ooh La La", in 1962 but this track and its b-side did not appear on the album. After the Oriole releases, Johnny Pearson continued to perform with various concert orchestras until 1964.

== Working with Cilla Black ==
In early 1964, Johnny Pearson took part in helping launch the career of Cilla Black, a rising singer who had been spotted by The Beatles' producer George Martin. She had released her first 45 single, "Love of the Loved", in 1963, but it had charted only modestly despite having been written by John Lennon and Paul McCartney. A scout for George Martin had spotted the track "Anyone Who Had a Heart" after hearing the US singer Dionne Warwick's version. Originally the song was to have been recorded in the UK by Shirley Bassey, but George Martin saw the piece as being more suitable for Black's voice. Early in 1964, "Anyone Who Had a Heart" was recorded by Cilla Black at London's Abbey Road Studios, in an arrangement by Pearson which featured the use of bassoons. In February 1964, it entered the UK Singles Chart, eventually reaching number 1 in both the UK and Ireland and also charting in other parts of Europe. The Dionne Warwick version was also in the UK charts at the time (although it only managed to peak at Number 42), but Cilla Black's treatment used slightly different lyrics and a different arrangement.

Following the success of "Anyone Who Had a Heart", Pearson was invited to work on the next Cilla Black single, "You're My World", which was released in May 1964. This was also recorded at Abbey Road Studios, and again went to number 1 on the UK Singles Chart. Pearson also worked on other Cilla Black tracks, some of which featured on her album, Cilla Sings a Rainbow.

== Sounds Orchestral ==
Sounds Orchestral was an idea by John Schroeder, who had moved from Oriole Records to become the label manager at Pye Records and was interested in producing an instrumental version of the US hit song "Cast Your Fate to the Wind". This had been suggested to him at the time by Pye staff member, Tony Reeves. As his project moved to fruition, Schroeder looked for a piano player. His efforts came about when he was reminded of Johnny Pearson from a few years earlier, after he heard him on Radio Luxembourg. Initially paid a session fee to record "Cast Your Fate to the Wind", Pearson was subsequently made a full partner in the Sounds Orchestral project. "Cast Your Fate to the Wind" was a number 5 hit in the UK Singles Chart in early 1965. Sounds Orchestral would end up recording some seventeen albums between 1965 and 1977. Some have subsequently been reissued on CD.

== Top of the Pops ==
Pearson first appeared on the BBC music show Top of the Pops in January 1965 playing piano with Sounds Orchestral on "Cast Your Fate to the Wind", which charted at the time. The following year in 1966, Pearson took charge of the Top of the Pops Orchestra, established after the Musicians' Union forbade miming on televised musical performances. By the summer of 1980, the Musicians' Union went on strike after budget cuts led to the BBC terminating several orchestras, including that of Top of the Pops. During the strike, Top of the Pops was off the air from June to August 1980. Pearson continued contributing to the programme until the 900th episode in the summer of 1981. Pearson's arrangement for the Top of the Pops Orchestra of Led Zeppelin's "Whole Lotta Love" was the theme tune to Top of the Pops for most of the 1970s.

== The Dusty Springfield TV series ==
During 1966, as well as Top of the Pops, Johnny Pearson worked and directed the orchestra for the Dusty Springfield shows which were produced and directed by Stanley Dorfman and recorded by the BBC, for television. It featured Johnny Pearson directing a full 32 piece orchestra. There were a total of twelve episodes made, six in 1966 and six in 1967. In recent years, the surviving nine episodes have been remastered and released as "Dusty Springfield Live at the BBC", on DVD.

== KPM ==
In 1966, Johnny Pearson also started his long association with the KPM library record label. KPM was originally known as Keith Prowse Music. KPM would later become part of the EMI Group of companies but was able to retain its independence due to its specialist nature. Pearson's involvement with KPM was to last many years until 1978, which is when he switched over his music library efforts to Bruton Music. Johnny Pearson would however again later return to KPM during 1988. That year's KPM 1000 Series double release Johnny Pearson Piano and Orchestra included several pieces featured in the second run of All Creatures Great and Small, which did not have the accompanying soundtrack release that the original run did.

Johnny Pearson's earliest contributions at KPM came in the form of contributing to KPM's in house orchestra, the Group-Forty Orchestra. KPM's Group-Forty Orchestra was an orchestra that existed between 1959 and 1966. Its role was to record background music for radio and television. From 1967, Johnny Pearson started appearing on many of KPM's music library recordings, in his own right.

== The Carpenters ==
In October 1971 Johnny Pearson was the musical director on the Stanley Dorfman directed and produced BBC Television special Carpenters: Live at the BBC, featuring the American musical duo of Karen and Richard Carpenter. It first aired on BBC1 on November 6, 1971. In early 1973 Pearson was again contacted by Richard Carpenter to ask permission to use one of his songs on the then forthcoming Carpenters LP, Now & Then. This track, originally titled "Autumn Reverie", first appeared on the 1968 KPM album Gentle Sounds, and was retitled "Heather" by producer John Bettis in the Carpenters' version. Richard Carpenter apparently first heard the track as background music for a commercial for the US health food supplement maker Geritol, and loved it straight away. "Autumn Reverie" would also feature again on the 1974 Johnny Pearson LP Touch Me in the Morning, and as background music on the British television series All Creatures Great and Small (1978–90).

== Johnny Pearson and his Orchestra ==
As leader of the Johnny Pearson Orchestra he reached number 8 in the United Kingdom chart in early 1972 with "Sleepy Shores", the theme from the television series Owen, M.D. (1971–73). The Johnny Pearson Orchestra, which as a musical project was begun in 1972, ran side by side with his other projects. At the time these projects included working on albums with John Schroeder for Sounds Orchestral and also providing library music to Britain's KPM Records.

Instead of the slightly jazzy sounding Sounds Orchestral albums, Pearson was offered a project for easy listening and romance music, based on the success of his "Sleepy Shores" hit. This time he teamed up with music executive Larry Page, who wanted to move his label Penny Farthing into the easy listening genre. The albums were released outside the UK in Europe, Australia, Canada and the US. In 1978 Larry Page decided to rename his Penny Farthing label to Rampage Records, to reflect a more modern outlook. One of the first singles and albums from the Rampage label would be another of Pearson's international hits, the eponymous theme from All Creatures Great and Small.

== Library and theme music ==
=== In the United Kingdom ===
Pearson was a successful composer of theme music for television series. Examples of his work included The Rat Catchers, All Creatures Great and Small, General Hospital, Captain Pugwash, Triangle, 3-2-1, Mary Mungo & Midge and ITN's News at Ten (the last of which formed part of "The Awakening", a piece otherwise known to American audiences as the main title theme to the 1974 animated film Journey Back to Oz). He also wrote the scores to Michael Winner's swinging 60s comedy film The Jokers (1967), the Robert Horton TV spy movies The Spy Killer (1969) and Foreign Exchange (1970), the Grampian Television start-up music "Sounds On", and the ATV startup theme "Midlands Montage", as well as music used during intervals between schools programmes on ITV.

=== In the United States ===
In the United States, Pearson's best-known composition is "Heavy Action", originally used as the theme to the BBC sports show Superstars, and subsequently adopted by ABC's Monday Night Football (the NFL's weekly nationally televised showcase) and the SFM Holiday Network. In 1989, Edd Kalehoff composed and recorded a new arrangement of this music for later seasons of Monday Night Football. From the 2018 NFL season onwards, ESPN brought back the original Pearson arrangement of "Heavy Action" as the main theme for Monday Night Football. Pearson's piece "Graveyard" was used in The Ren and Stimpy Show and SpongeBob SquarePants, and his piece "Mini Walking" was used on Sesame Street as the score for the animated story segment Nancy the Nannygoat by Tee Collins and part of the score for Bill Cosby's Aesop's Fables animated special from Filmation. NFL Films has used many of his other compositions for its Super Bowl and other highlight films.

Pearson's "Power Drive," composed in 1967, was known in the U.S. and Canada for use in some episodes of the 1967-70 cartoon series Spider-Man, as well as being the theme for Los Angeles station KNXT/KCBS-TV's afternoon movie series The Early Show for much of the 1970s and into the 1980s, as well as for their Saturday night movie show The Fabulous 52 from the late 1960s until the end of its run in 1974. "Power Drive" and "Evening Sky," among others, were also used as background music by NFL Films.

=== In Australia ===
In Australia, his best-known library music piece was "Power Drive," which was used as the theme for the 1969-75 police drama Division 4. Some of Johnny Pearson's library music was also used as background scene music for the Ten Network series, Prisoner. Also during late 2011, another Johnny Pearson track, And a Very Good Morning to You, from 1970, was used as a piece of background music, on the Nine Network series, Underbelly. The track "Sleepy Shores" was also used as incidental music in some of the courting scenes from the 1970s ABC TV drama series, Certain Women. Alternative rock band TISM sampled "Power Drive" in their 1998 single "Thunderbirds are Coming Out".

=== In the Netherlands ===
In the 1970s, Johnny Pearson composed the music score for the Dutch TV series Sil de Strandjutter, performed by his orchestra. Pearson's composition "Autumn Reverie", as "Heather" performed by the Carpenters, has served as the background music to the "Plaat & zijn Verhaal"-section ("A record and its story") at Radio Veronica, in which a song's lyrics are translated into Dutch and read by the DJ. This composition, in the Carpenters' version, was also the last music to be heard before Radio Veronica went off the air in 1974.

== The 1980s and later ==
After leaving Top of the Pops, Pearson continued to work on independent projects throughout the 1980s. With his friend and business partner Adrian Kerridge he took on the ownership of the Lansdowne Studios in Holland Park. In 1982 he released the instrumental album On Golden Pond through Larry Page's Page One Records.

In 1984, Pearson assembled another orchestra, the Johnny Pearson Studio Orchestra, and contributed to John Paul Jones' motion picture soundtrack, Scream For Help. Following this, during 1985, he worked on producing music for the BBC TV production drama Maelstrom. Notable on the recordings for Maelstrom is the track "Camellia Waltz", which was treated to sound like an old 78 rpm record. Other tracks by Pearson for the series came from his work with KPM. In 1987, together with business partner at Lansdowne Adrian Kerridge, Pearson negotiated the purchase of CTS Studios in Wembley. In 1988, he returned to the KPM record label and the recording of two new library CDs for the radio and television industry. Both were recorded at CTS Studios in Wembley, with Adrian Kerridge.

After the 1980s, Pearson made occasional live appearances as part of a quartet. During 1993, Johnny Pearson worked with Shirley Bassey on a new album recording. Titled "Shirley Bassey sings the songs of Andrew Lloyd Webber", this was recorded at the CTS Studios. With Johnny Pearson mainly conducting, the album was subsequently released through EMI. More recently, it has now been reissued on compact disc.

In 1996, Johnny Pearson recorded a CD of library music, for the radio and television industry, titled Simply Piano. This was followed in 2005 by another CD, Simply Piano 2.

== Death ==
Johnny Pearson died at the age of 85, on 20 March 2011. He is survived by Alex, his wife of many years whom he married in 1963.

== Discography ==
Johnny Pearson at one time had at least four different projects going at the same time: Sounds Orchestral, as pianist; Johnny Pearson and his Orchestra; work with KPM Records, with background music for radio and television; and as arranger with Top of the Pops. Apart from his work with John Schroeder and Sounds Orchestral, at Pye during 1964–1975, his solo work included:

- 1962 Piano Sweet - Piano Wild (Oriole PS40023)
- 1967 Portrait of the 20th Century (KPM Records UK)
- 1970 Sounds Extravanganza (Aristocrat UK)
- 1970 The Johnny Pearson Sound, Studio 70 Orchestra (A&M Records)
- 1971 Heavy Action (Superstars)
- 1972 Sleepy Shores
- 1974 Touch Me in the Morning
- 1975 In Love
- 1976 Sil de strandjutter (original score from Dutch TV series)
- 1976 Rodrigos Guitar Concerto (Australian reissue of Sleepy Shores)
- 1977 If You Leave Me Now
- 1978 All Creatures Great and Small: The Original Music from the TV Series and Other Favourite Themes (UK release)
- 1980 Bright Eyes
- 1981 I Remember that Summer
- 1982 On Golden Pond (PAGE1 Records)

Compilations:

- 1980 Thinking of You (Endeavour Records - Castle Australia)

All the above were released on 12-inch vinyl, and from 1972 to the late 1970s, on the Penny Farthing Label, with Larry Page producing. In Australia, Sleepy Shores and Touch Me in the Morning are on Festival Records. In Australia from 1976 to 1980, Johnny Pearson and his Orchestra were on M7 Records. M7 Records was the offshoot of the ATN7 Television network of Australia. In Japan, Pearson was on JVC Victor. Around 1989, multiple releases occurred to coincide with the abandonment of vinyl records by the global music industry. Titles to be found included Themes and Dreams.

=== Compact disc releases ===
- 1989 Themes and Dreams (President Records PRCD171) UK
- 1989 Golden Instrumental Hits (Laserlight 15 171) German
- 1991 Sleepy Shores (BR Music BR132-2) Europe
- 1997 Best of Johnny Pearson and Orchestra (Music Club MCCD304) UK
- 1998 Breaking Up and Making Up (Music Collection Int ETDCD057) UK
- 1999 Music and Romance (Disky Communications INS857162) Dutch
- 2010 King of Elegant Piano (JVC Victor Japan VICP47025) Double CD

== Selected television compositions ==
- Captain Pugwash
- Ready Steady Go!
- The Rat Catchers
- ITV News at Ten
- Mary, Mungo and Midge
- Division 4
- Owen, M.D.
- Carpenters: Live at the BBC
- Superstars
- Top of the Pops
- General Hospital
- All Creatures Great and Small
- Monday Night Football
- Triangle
- Maelstrom
- 3-2-1
- Singles
