= Stanley Dorfman =

English television director and producer (b. 1927)

- Born: 24 November 1927 (age 98); Johannesburg, South Africa
- Occupations: Television program creator, Television director, Television producer, Music video director
- Notable work: Top of the Pops, In Concert (British TV series), In Concert (American TV series), Sinatra in Concert, Disc One of the Led Zeppelin DVD: Royal Albert Hall concert in 1970, The Bobbie Gentry Show, The John Denver Show, Official music video: David Bowie "Heroes", Official music video: Blondie "Heart of Glass", Woodstock '94, Woodstock '99

Stanley Dorfman (born 24 November 1927) is a South African-born British music television director, producer, and painter. He is known as the co-creator and original producer and director of the BBC music program Top of the Pops. His work on the program contributed to the development of music videos.

During his time at the BBC, Dorfman created, directed and produced the music television series the music television series In Concert, where he served as director and producer. He provided many notable musicians with their debut television opportunities. Dorfman played a pivotal role in advancing the careers of women in television during the late 1960s, including by directing and producing three of the first television series on the BBC that were hosted by female performers. He also produced and directed jazz and big band series for the BBC, and series around John Denver, Mary Travers, and Jack Jones.

Dorfman's also directed and produced television specials including Frank Sinatra In Concert at the Royal Festival Hall, and the televised performance of Rudolf Nureyev in Giselle, which stands as Nureyev's sole documented performance of the unabridged ballet. Dorfman was the director of televised live music events like the A.R.M.S. benefit concert in London in 1984, the Amnesty International Human Rights Concerts between 1986 and 1998, and the Woodstock '94 and Woodstock '99 music festivals.

His work also includes music videos and promotional films for David Bowie, John Lennon, Yoko Ono, Ringo Star, Harry Nilsson, Jefferson Starship, and Blondie. In 1970 he directed Led Zeppelin's concert at the Royal Albert Hall on film; footage from the concert was later used for official music video releases by the band: "How Many More Times", "Dazed and Confused", and "What Is and What Should Never Be".

== Early life and education ==
Dorfman was born in Johannesburg, South Africa to a Jewish family. In 1946, he received a scholarship to study painting and fresco at the École des Beaux-Arts and the Académie Julian in Paris. After completing his studies, he moved to St Ives in Cornwall, England. There, Dorfman joined the Penwith Society of Arts and exhibited his paintings alongside abstract artists such as Barbara Hepworth, Ben Nicholson, Peter Lanyon and Sven Berlin.

After returning to South Africa, Dorfman took a stance against the prevalent racial segregation laws of the time by organizing concerts named Township Jazz for the African Musician's Union. The concerts provided a platform for African jazz musicians to perform for multiracial audiences, featuring artists like Miriam Makeba and Hugh Masekela. However, this defiance of the status quo drew the attention of the police, leading to raids and increased scrutiny of his activities.

A lawyer affiliated with Nelson Mandela's party advised Dorfman to leave the country immediately as he was being actively pursued by the authorities under the General Law Amendment Act, also known as the 90-Day Detention Law. This law enabled South African police officers to detain individuals for up to 90 days without a warrant, cause, or access to legal representation, and it could be indefinitely repeated. In response to this advice, Dorfman departed for Europe, leaving his wife and children in South Africa until he could safely arrange for them to join him.

Dorfman began his television career in 1959, initially working as a production designer for the BBC on programs such as An Evening with Nat King Cole, Meet Sammy Davis Jr., and Margot Fonteyn: Birthday of a Ballerina. He later received training on production through the BBC Television Training course in 1963. This training equipped him for his subsequent roles as a producer and director for the music television series Top of the Pops, starting in 1964.

== Television series ==
=== Top of the Pops ===
In 1964, Dorfman and Johnnie Stewart co-created the British chart music television series Top of the Pops at a time when rock music was gaining mainstream acceptance. The show introduced the format that would become synonymous with chart rankings in the UK. With continuous weekly broadcasts, the show enjoyed a 42-year run and reached audiences in over 120 countries.

Dorfman and Stewart served as alternating directors for the show, starting from its inception on 1 January 1964, and worked together as producers. This partnership continued until 1969, after which Mel Cornish took over from Stewart. Dorfman continued as the director and producer of the series until 1971, during which he directed 156 episodes over a six-year period. Following this, he transitioned into the role of executive producer for an additional five years.

Through his work on Top of the Pops, Dorfman established himself as a pioneer in the music video industry. To accommodate the numerous anticipated top 20 acts on the chart each week, Dorfman and Stewart introduced the concept of pre-recorded music videos, then referred to as "promotional films" or "filmed inserts". One of the earliest notable examples was a video Dorfman directed in October 1964 for Roy Orbison's "Oh Pretty Woman". This practice allowed the show to feature acts even if they could not physically be there due to tour schedules. An example of such an act was The Beatles, who would often pre-record exclusive videos for their songs.

By 1970, Top of the Pops had solidified the importance of music videos as a tool for promoting new releases and emerging acts. Dorfman, with his significant influence on the show's content, was considered capable of making or breaking a music group. His pivotal role in expanding the show's format cemented Top of the Pops as a top-rated program on the BBC and the premier platform for launching new music during that period.

=== In Concert (British TV series) ===
Dorfman created the television series In Concert, which he directed and produced from its inception until 1974. The series followed the success of Dorfman's television special, Leonard Cohen sings Leonard Cohen, Cohen's debut television concert. Dorfman conceptualized to showcase modern popular music as a fusion of blues, jazz, classical, and folk. According to Melody Maker, Dorfman introduced artists such as Leonard Cohen, Randy Newman, James Taylor, David Gates, Chuck Berry, Joni Mitchell, Kris Kristofferson and Harry Nilsson, and his choices were not governed by the artists' chart positions. As such, the series played a pivotal role in establishing singer-songwriters as capable of carrying an entire television episode without any distractions. In Never a dull moment: 1971—the year that rock exploded, British music journalist and author David Hepworth writes that a few singer-songwriters had performed sitting down prior to Dorfman's programs, and the shows presented more than just performances; they created an intimate atmosphere where the audience felt they were invited to eavesdrop. Dorman's contributions to the show were acknowledged in the British Press as having provided modern music with "its only serious outlet on TV" and elevating pop music to a cultural level.

In Concert episodes often marked significant firsts for the artists featured. This includes debut television or concert appearances, or instances where they unveiled new songs before their official release. For instance, Joni Mitchell performed "California" on an episode a year before its release on her album Blue, Elton John performed "Your Song" three days before its release which later became his first top ten hit in both the UK and the US, and Carole King performed her influential album Tapestry on an episode shortly after its release, gaining significant recognition. In Concert also served as a crucial platform for numerous other artists. The Carpenters were featured, as was Cat Stevens, who performed songs from his album Teaser and the Firecat on an episode three months before the album's official release. Another highlight was Neil Young's performance of songs that would appear a year later on his critically acclaimed album Harvest. Biographer Jimmy McDonough, in his biography Shakey: Neil Young's biography, referred to Dorfman's footage of Young as "the great visual document of the Harvest Period." The series also holds a special place in the career of Harry Nilsson. Despite his success as a recording artist, Nilsson rarely performed live. His appearance on In Concert stands as the only complete concert performance of his career, making it a unique piece of music history.

Other singer-songwriters who appeared on In Concert include Randy Newman, Crosby, Stills, Nash & Young, David Bowie, Harry Nilsson, Ravi Shankar, Bill Withers, Neil Diamond, Paul Williams, James Taylor, Al Green, Glen Campbell, Bobbie Gentry, James Taylor, Laura Nyro, Mary Travers, Jim Webb, Donovan, Ronnie Wood, John Denver, America, John Prine, John Williams, the Eagles, the Kinks, Buddy Rich, the Pointer Sisters, Gordon Lightfoot, Mason Williams, Martin Mull, and the Mahavishnu Orchestra, Jonny Mercer, Stomu Yamash'ta, Sonny Terry, Brownie McGhee, Oscar Peterson, among others.

Between 1968 and 1974, Dorfman directed and produced over 200 episodes of In Concert. The Guardian hailed the series as the only music television program that "produced television ideas" and is "a clear demonstration of what we are missing elsewhere". As of 2023, episodes of In Concert continue to air on BBC networks.

=== In Concert (American TV series) ===
In 1974, six years into Dorfman directing and producing his single singer-songwriter-per-episode series In Concert at the BBC, Dick Clark asked him to direct an American series featuring rock acts, which was also called In Concert, for ABC Television Center, which led Dorfman to relocate to Los Angeles. Clark had previously envisaged the show's format to highlight a number of rock acts per episode, but Dorfman simplified it to mirror his UK series by featuring only one act each episode. Episodes directed by Dorfman included performances by Black Sabbath, Electric Light Orchestra, David Bowie, Fleetwood Mac, Dolly Parton, Linda Ronstadt, Steve Miller Band, Barry White, Ray Stevens, Tammy Wynette, Bo Diddley, Chet Atkins, James Brown, and many others.

=== Happening for Lulu ===
Dorfman was the director and producer of the television series Happening for Lulu, a series of programs of music and comedy broadcast in a prime slot on the BBC between 1968 and 1969. The series was hosted by Scottish singer Lulu and featured guest performances by prominent musicians like the Beatles, comedians, and dancers. It was filmed weekly before a live studio audience of about 100 people.

Before 1978, the BBC did not have a formal policy for archiving footage and routinely wiped and reused tapes to create additional storage space. Consequently, the only surviving footage of Happening for Lulu features Jimi Hendrix's appearance on the show in January 1969, considered by Time magazine as one of his most memorable moments.

On the day of the recording, the band Cream had just announced their disbandment. According to bass player Noel Redding's autobiography, he, Hendrix, and drummer Mitch Mitchell arrived at the studio and decided to smoke some hash in their dressing room. When they accidentally dropped the hash down the drain, they persuaded a BBC maintenance worker to dismantle the drain to retrieve it.

During the show, Hendrix interrupted a performance of Hey Joe to dedicate a song to Cream. He then performed an extended, impassioned instrumental of the Cream classic "Sunshine of Your Love". He played for so long that Dorfman had to pull him off the air. Despite the apparent chaos this caused on set, Redding recounted that the segment became one of the band's most frequently used pieces of film. Contrary to popular legend suggesting that Hendrix was banned from the BBC for life, Redding clarified that Dorfman appreciated their performance and even invited them for a drink afterwards. Dorfman later described Hendrix as a quiet and kind person, unaware that he'd done anything wrong. Although Hendrix passed away the following year, his performance on Happening for Lulu remains a significant moment in rock and roll history.

=== Dusty ===
In the late 1960s, Dorfman played a crucial role in bringing the talent of Dusty Springfield to television. In 1967 and 1968, he directed and produced two TV series for the British pop star, known as Dusty (also referred to as The Dusty Springfield Show), making it one of the first shows of its kind to be hosted by a female performer.

Dorfman opted for a straightforward format for the show, focusing on Springfield's performances without the inclusion of sketches or gimmicks. Springfield was backed by a thirty-two-piece orchestra, directed by accompanied by Johnny Pearson, a collaborator of Dorfman from their time together on Top of the Pops. Accompanying Springfield with backing vocals were soul singer Madeline Bell, who later became a member of Blue Mink, Lesley Duncan who provided vocals to Pink Floyd's The Dark Side of the Moon, and Maggie Stredder, founding member of the Ladybirds. The BBC commissioned a second series of Dusty, introducing special guests who often appeared in non-musical appearances, including Warren Mitchell and the then-rising American comedian Woody Allen. Unfortunately, due to the common practice at the time of reusing tapes for storage purposes, all of the original tapes of Dusty Springfield's BBC show were erased in the 1970s.

In the following years, the BBC attempted to retrieve the erased recordings from overseas stations where the series had been sold. This effort resulted in the recovery of several tapes, including three from the first series and all six from the second series. These retrieved recordings were subsequently released by the BBC on a DVD entitled Dusty Springfield Live at the BBC.

=== Once More With Felix and The Julie Felix Show ===
Dorfman also directed and produced Once More With Felix, the first color television series entirely dedicated to a female performer, which aired on the newly established BBC2. The series established Julie Felix as one of the top television performers in the United Kingdom. Dorfman also produced and directed the successor to Once More With Felix, titled The Julie Felix Show. Both series encompassed a broad range of genres such as folk jazz, folk pop, protest songs, and occasional poetry. Felix's performances on these shows were accompanied by renowned and emerging talent of the era. This included musicians like Billy Preston, the Kinks, Tim Buckley, the Hollies, the Incredible String Band, Fleetwood Mac, and the Four Tops, as well as comedians like Peter Cook and Spike Milligan. Led Zeppelin lead guitarist Jimmy Page gave a rare solo performance, playing "White Summer" and "Black Mountain Side".

The BBC wiped most of the master tapes of the series. As a result, only selected excerpts of varying quality remain, which can be found on platforms like YouTube. Despite the loss of much of the original footage, a few memorable segments survive. These include Felix's duets with Leonard Cohen, marking his television debut, and a segment in which Felix joins the Incredible String Band in singing and playing guitar on their song "Paintbox".

=== The Bobbie Gentry Show ===
In 1968, after featuring folk singer-songwriter Bobbie Gentry on an episode of his series In Concert, Dorfman produced and directed the television series Bobbie Gentry, making Gentry the first female songwriter to front a series on the BBC network. Bobbie Gentry was broadcast from 1968 to 1971. The series featured musicians from the Mississippi countryside, as well as guests such as Glen Campbell, James Taylor, Randy Newman, Elton John, Alan Price, Billy Preston, and Pan's People. John Cameron was the music arranger and Flick Colby was the choreographer. Bobbie Gentry garnered widespread recognition and was syndicated globally. In 1970, Dorfman and Gentry were engaged to be married.

=== Sounds for Saturday ===
In 1972, Dorfman created, directed, and produced the series Sounds for Saturday, the first jazz music television series on the BBC. Each 55 minute episode showcased a leading artist of the day from the world of jazz and featured a single artist, and afforded American soul artists with their first serious platform in the UK, and illustrating how varied music was becoming. The series aired weekly, and included episodes featuring Duke Ellington and his Orchestra, Johnny Dankworth, the Count Basie Orchestra, the Modern Jazz Quartet, Oscar Peterson, Richie Havens, the 5th Dimension, Jan Hammer, Thelma Houston, Roberta Flack, Harry James and His Orchestra, Doris Troy, Stan Kenton, Buddy Rich, Alan Price, Kenny Wheeler, Johnny "Guitar" Watson, Harry James, Osibisa, Rick Laird, Herbie Flowers, John Lewis, and many others.

=== Mary: Rhymes and Reasons ===
In 1972, Dorfman directed and produced the television series Mary: Rhymes and Reasons, which first broadcast on the BBC on 20 August 1972. The series was hosted by the American singer-songwriter Mary Travers, who was known for being in the 1960s folk trio Peter, Paul and Mary. The series consisted of six episodes and explored "living and loving through song and conversation". Special guests included comedians Spike Milligan and Peter Cook, actor and screenwriter Colin Welland, and singer-songwriters Georgia Brown, Don McLean, and Paul Williams.

=== The Jack Jones Show ===
In 1973, when the American double Grammy Award winning singer and actor Jack Jones signed on to do The Jack Jones Show for the BBC, he stipulated that it should be produced by Dorfman, who directed and produced the series between 1973 and 1978. Hosted by Jones, the show featured the British female dance troupe Pan's People and vocal backing by the Ladybirds. Special guests included: the Welsh singer Shirley Bassey, American conductor, keyboard player and musicologist Joshua Rifkin, the American jazz saxophonist Stan Getz, American musician Bruce Johnston, British pop artist Allen Jones, and American actor Martin Mull, the American lyricist, songwriter, singer and record executive Johnny Mercer, the English jazz singer and actress Cleo Laine, the American jazz and classical singer Sarah Vaughn, and others.

=== The John Denver Show ===
Dorfman played a significant role in the early television career of John Denver, an American singer-songwriter. In 1973, Dorfman produced and directed The John Denver Show, which aired on the BBC. At the time, Denver was just making a name for himself in America. His manager Jerry Weintraub, took a calculated risk by agreeing to a series of shows in England under Dorfman's direction, potentially foregoing income from personal appearances in the United States.

Denver first appeared on the Mary Travers episode of Dorfman's In Concert series, prior to Dorfman inviting him to have his own In Concert episode. This eventually led to the creation of The John Denver Show.

By 1974, Denver had become one of America's top-selling performers, and his popularity continued to surge. His involvement in television and the recording of multiple RCA albums, in conjunction with his ongoing hit songs and performances in larger venues, led to a significant increase in his fan base. Dorfman's guidance and the platform he provided helped Denver hone his skills and build confidence in his on-camera presence, proving invaluable in Denver's later television appearances.

== Television specials ==
=== Pop Go the Sixties! ===
In 1969, Dorfman directed Pop Go the Sixties! (also known as Pop Go the 60s!), a 75-minute television special celebrating the decade's significant pop hits. Co-produced with Johnnie Stewart, his collaborator on Top of the Pops, the show had a similar aesthetic and style. Featured artists included the Who, Adam Faith, the Bachelors, Sandie Shaw, the Marmalade, the Kinks, the Hollies, Tom Jones, the Rolling Stones, Cilla Black, the Shadows, Cliff Richard, the Beatles, and Dusty Springfield, among others. Pop Go The Sixties! was a co-production between the BBC and West Germany's ZDF. It first aired in color on the BBC on 31 December 1969, and subsequently on ZDF and other European stations under different titles. The end titles were presented in both English and German. Despite re-airing on BBC Four and the Yesterday channel, more recent broadcasts often exclude the Beatles' performances due to rights changes.

=== Sinatra in Concert at Royal Festival Hall ===
On 16 November 1970, Dorfman also produced and directed Sinatra In Concert at the Royal Festival Hall for television. Frank Sinatra, introduced by Grace Kelly and accompanied by jazz pianist Bill Miller and drummer Irving Cottler, requested a camera to always be focused on his face. Dorfman implemented this method in all his future productions. Sinatra In Concert was broadcast in the UK on BBC on 22 November 1970, and on CBS in America on 4, February 1971 . Sinatra's respect for Dorfman was evident when he insisted on Dorfman being seated beside him during a dinner at Kensington Palace.

On 22 November, Dorfman produced and directed Night of Nights, featuring Bob Hope, and introduced by Noël Coward.

=== Led Zeppelin – Live At The Royal Albert Hall ===
In 1970, Dorfman was hired by Led Zeppelin to direct of their performance at the Royal Albert Hall. Dorfman brought on Peter Whitehead, a cameraman who had worked for him on Top of the Pops, and together, using handheld Bolex cameras, they filmed the concert on 16 mm film. Dorfman and Whitehead later edited the footage together.

This footage was eventually released in 2003 as Disc One of the Led Zeppelin DVD, which became RIAA certified 13 times multi-platinum that year and is considered the best-selling music DVD in history. In 2022, Led Zeppelin released three official music videos featuring this footage: "How Many More Times", "Dazed and Confused", and "What Is and What Should Never Be."

=== The Carpenters ===
In October 1971, Dorfman produced and directed a taped studio concert titled The Carpenters In Concert (a.k.a. Carpenters: Live at the BBC), featuring the American musical duo Karen and Richard Carpenter. This was the Carpenter's first television special. The US audience would have to wait five more years later before a special titled The Carpenters' Very First TV Special was aired. The Carpenters In Concert first aired on BBC1 on 6 November 1971. The concert was later broadcast for American audiences on VH-1. However, due to the inclusion of commercial breaks and time constraints, several songs were omitted from the broadcast. These songs included "And When He Smiles", "That on the Road Look", "Lustful Earl and the Married Woman", and "I Fell in Love with You".

=== Harry Nilsson: A Little Touch of Schmilsson in the Night ===
In March 1973, Dorfman directed and produced the BBC television special Harry Nilsson: A Little Touch of Schmilsson in the Night. The show, which first aired on 10 June 1973, on BBC Two, coincided with Nilsson's album recording of the same name at Wembley Studios in London. Dorfman, who was watching the album recording in progress, persuaded Nilsson to recreate the recording session as a television special by the same name. After observing the recording session, Dorfman convinced Nilsson to replicate it as a TV special.

The title came from a Shakespeare quote from Henry V Act IV, "Behold, as may unworthiness define, A little touch of Harry in the night," adapted at Dorfman's suggestion by replacing "Harry" with "Schmilsson", referring to Nilsson's prior album, Nilsson Schmilsson. The special was filmed in a single take, featuring Nilsson at the center of an orchestra at BBC Television Theatre, rather than in a booth. In 1994, Mojo magazine asserted, "There has been nothing better on music TV since." Notably, this TV special was one of Nilsson's rare television appearances and the only full concert he performed in his career.

== Live Concert Broadcasts ==
=== Eric Clapton & Friends - The A.R.M.S. Benefit Concert ===
In 1983, Dorfman directed the television special of Eric Clapton & Friends - The A.R.M.S. Benefit Concert, held at London's Royal Albert Hall on 20 September. The concert was organized by Faces bassist Ronnie Lane to fundraise for A.R.M.S. (Action into Research for Multiple Sclerosis) and marked a turning point in Jimmy Page's career following the loss of drummer John Bonham and the disbandment of Led Zeppelin. Historically depicted as pop "rivals" Eric Clapton, Jimmy Page, and Jeff Beck rarely collaborated with each other. However, at this concert, they each performed solo sets before joining as a supergroup for some of Clapton's songs. Other performers included the Rolling Stones' Bill Wyman and Charlie Watts, Andy Fairweather Low, Steve Winwood, and the Faces' Kenney Jones.

=== The Paris Concert for Amnesty International: The Struggle Continues ===
In 1998, Dorfman directed the three-hour television special of The Struggle Continues, a human rights concert in Paris supporting Amnesty International, the Nobel Peace Prize-winning human rights organization. The concert took place at Bercy Stadium on 10 December 1998, commemorating the 50th anniversary of the signing of the United Nations Universal Declaration of Human Rights.

The concert showcased performances from acclaimed artists including Bruce Springsteen, Peter Gabriel, Radiohead, Robert Plant, Jimmy Page, Tracy Chapman, Alanis Morissette, and Shania Twain. World leaders like the Dalai Lama and Nelson Mandela spoke about human rights. The event was broadcast via pay-per-view in the U.S. in 1999 and released on DVD in 2013.

=== Woodstock '94 ===
In 1994, Dorfman directed the televised coverage of the Woodstock '94 music festival, also known as Woodstock '94. The event was broadcast live on MTV via pay-per-view in the U.S. and Canada from Friday 12–14 August, in Saugerties, N.Y. The festival celebrated the 25th anniversary of the original 1969 Woodstock and was marketed as "Two More Days of Peace & Music". 250,000 tickets were available.

Over the three days, fifty bands and special guests played on two stages. Dorfman directed the performances on the main North stage, using the early analog HD 1125-line Hi-Vision system in a 16:9 aspect ratio. Artists on this stage included Sheryl Crow, Nine Inch Nails, Metallica, Aerosmith, Cypress Hill, Red Hot Chili Peppers, and Bob Dylan, among others. The footage was used for a theatrical documentary about the event, and HD footage was mixed live into standard definition 4:3 NTSC for cable TV broadcast.

=== Woodstock '99 ===
In 1999, Dorfman directed the television coverage of the Woodstock 1999 music festival, also called Woodstock '99, for MTV. The festival was broadcast live on pay-per-view and was held from 22–25 July 1999. The location for the event was the former Griffiss Air Force Base, a Superfund site, on the east side of Rome, New York.

Woodstock '99 was one of the most significant music events of the 20th century, featuring over 100 top artists of that era. With an attendance of approximately 400,000 people, it was the second large-scale music festival held after Woodstock '94. The festival was financially successful, with reports indicating a gross take of $28,864,748".

Dorfman directed the televised performances on the main "East stage". The line up included a mix of rock, pop, and hip-hop artists such as Sheryl Crow, Live, James Brown, DMX, Korn, Kid Rock, Alanis Morissette, Rage Against the Machine, Metallica, Dave Matthews Band, Willie Nelson, Elvis Costello, Jewel, and Red Hot Chili Peppers, among others.

Despite the star-studded line-up and financial success, Woodstock '99 has been described as "notorious" and "a flashpoint in cultural nadir". This description likely stems from the numerous reports of violence, sexual assault, and inadequate provisions for attendees, leading to chaotic and unsafe conditions that marred the festival's legacy.

== Music videos ==
In 1977, Dorfman directed the music videos for David Bowie's songs "'Heroes'" and "Be My Wife", both iconic tracks in Bowie's discography. The latter, "Be My Wife," was notably Bowie's first music video since Mick Rock's creations during the Ziggy Stardust era.

=== David Bowie: "Be My Wife" ===
"Be My Wife" was released as the second and final single from the seminal album Low on 17 June 1977, in the UK. This album heralded the start of Bowie's critically lauded Berlin Trilogy, a series of albums that solidified his status as an influential figure in the music industry.

The music video, shot in Paris, is characterized by a minimalist aesthetic, set against a stark white background in an empty room, Bowie's performance in the video conveys oscillates between nonchalance and anguish, striking a delicate balance between the two. His mannerisms and make up in the video may have been influenced by the renowned comic Buster Keaton, whom Bowie deeply admired.

In his book The Complete David Bowie, Nicholas Pegg observes that Bowies make up is reminiscent of Joel Grey's Emcee character in the 1972 Berlin-based film Cabaret. The video both draws on and deliberately contradicts Bowies previous, more extravagant personas, marking a significant shift in his artistic expression. Despite its innovative concept and execution, the video was scarcely seen in the UK at the time of its release in 1977 due to limited distribution. Over the years, alternative edits of the video have circulated among collectors.

=== David Bowie: "Heroes" ===
In 1977, Dorfman directed the music video for one of Bowie's most famous, covered, and licensed songs, "'Heroes". The video is shot primarily in a dark room, with Bowie being silhouetted and bathed by a foggy luminescent light, creating a dramatic aesthetic that persists almost from beginning to end. Nicholas Pegg draws parallels between this video and Liza Minnelli's performance of "Maybe This Time" in the movie Cabaret. In his book I'm Not a Film Star: David Bowie as Actor, Ian Dixon suggests that Dorfman made "conscious cinematic references" to films such as Close Encounters of the Third Kind, Marlon Brando's performance in The Wild One, and the representation of the Hindu Goddess Parvati. However, a 2016 Pitchfork article notes that Dorfman's "'Heroes'" video predates the release of Close Encounters of the Third Kind, making "the similarity with key shots from that film all the more remarkable".

There was initially some confusion around the directorship of the "Heroes" video, with some attributions made to Nicholas Ferguson, including in Pegg's book The Complete David Bowie. However, Pegg later clarified on his blog Guts of a Beggar, that Dorfman was indeed the director. This was confirmed by the David Bowie archive in 2008 when the complete works of David Bowie's music videos were gifted to the Museum of Modern Art (MoMA), naming Dorfman as the sole director.

In 2008, the "Heroes" music video was included in the MoMA exhibition Looking at Music, curated by Barbara London and Thurston Moore. This selection contributed to a David Bowie retrospective at the museum. In 2022, the British Film Institute (BFI) showcased Dorfman's video and a compilation of alternative edits in a David Bowie special edition of their series, "BUG: The Evolution of Music Video," further testament to its enduring impact and relevance in the realm of music videos.

=== David Bowie: "Sense of Doubt" ===
In 1977, Dorfman directed an as-yet-unreleased video for Bowie's expressionistic piano-driven song "Sense of Doubt", a track from Side B of his "Heroes" album. The video shows a visual continuity with the "Heroes" video, featuring Bowie in the same bomber jacket and appearing to have been filmed on the same set.

The creative process for the video was influenced by Brian Eno's Oblique Strategies, a deck of oracle cards that Eno designed in conjunction with painter Peter Schmidt. Subtitled "Over One Hundred Worthwhile Dilemmas", these cards were used to stimulate creativity and challenge conventional thinking, guiding artists to consider their work from new perspectives. They served as an inspiration in the crafting of the "Sense of Doubt" video, contributing to its experimental and innovative nature.

=== Blondie: "Heart of Glass" ===
In 1979, Dorfman directed the music video for Blondie's song "Heart of Glass", a song that became the band's first chart-topper. The video begins with night-time scenes of New York City featuring an infrared shot of the World Trade Center, before shifting to the band's on-stage performance beneath a disco ball. Jess Harvell, in his review of the Greatest Hits: Sound & Vision DVD for Pitchfork, noted that even though owning a personal copy of 'Heart of Glass' might not seem as cool anymore "there's the always luminous Deborah Harry, who would give boiling asparagus an erotic charge, all while looking too bored to live." Contrary to popular belief, despite the brief appearance of the iconic Studio 54 in the music video, the actual filming took place at a now-defunct establishment known as the Copa. The video unfolds with a mix of intimate close-ups of lead vocalist Debbie Harry and mid-distance shots of the band's performance.

The video received widespread acknowledgment for its distinct style and sex appeal. In 1979, Richard Cromelin from Los Angeles Times wrote, "'Death to Disco' T-shirts weren't an uncommon sight among the new wave audience that formed Blondie's first base of support. But, as it turns out, it's disco that's given life to Blondie." The music news site Stereogum included "Heart of Glass" in their list of the top 40 videos played on MTV's first day, ranking it at number 6. They described it as "an abject lesson in sex appeal", even though "nothing really happens in the nearly four minutes that elapse". Insider also recognized the video as one of the most iconic music video looks of all time.

=== John Lennon: "Grow Old With Me" ===
In 1984, Dorfman directed the music video for John Lennon's song "Grow Old with Me", one of the final songs written by Lennon. The video featured home movies of Lennon and Yoko Ono walking in Central Park, Lennon dancing, and other intimate moments from Lennon's personal film archive.

=== Ringo Starr: "Only You (And You Alone)", Goodnight Vienna ===
In 1974, while Dorfman was not working full-time for the BBC anymore, he was increasingly creating promotional films for music albums. At the suggestion of John Lennon, Ringo Starr recorded of the 1955 hit, "Only You (And You Alone)", a song originally popularized by The Platters. This track was released on Starr's studio album Goodnight Vienna.

In mid-November, Dorfman was engaged to produce and direct a television commercial for Ringo Starr's Goodnight Vienna album and a music video for his song "Only You (And You Alone)". Dorfman chose the rooftop of the Capitol Records Building in Los Angeles, known for its distinct resembling a stack of discs, as the shooting location for both the commercial and the music video.

The music video extended the narrative from the commercial, depicting Starr's spacecraft landing on the building. Starr, wearing a spacesuit, boards the spacecraft before it takes off over the city. John Lennon, who played the acoustic guitar on the recording, provided a voiceover for this scene. The video featured appearances from Harry Nilsson, and Keith Moon, who can be seen dancing and leaping on the building's sloping roof. Dorfman arranged for lasers to shoot beams of light from a nearby building, illuminated Starr's spacesuit.

A lightweight flying saucer and a forty-foot robot were placed on the building, as Starr and Nilsson, the latter wearing a brown dressing robe, was sitting in a rocking chair and casually smoking a cigarette while reading the morning's Los Angeles Times. At street level, an orange-clad marching band and forty actors, who had previously portrayed Munchkins in The Wizard of Oz danced.

=== Harry Nilsson: Duit On Mon Dei ===
In October 1974, Dorfman directed and produced a promotional film for Harry Nilsson's album Duit on Mon Dei, which was released in 1975. The film included an appearance by Ringo Starr who played on the album track "Kojak Columbo". Starr's appearance was a return favor to Nilsson's participation in Starr's spaceship film for his album, Goodnight Vienna, which Dorfman had also directed.

Dorfman created the video for "Kojak Columbo" at a significantly lower cost than Starr's Goodnight Vienna production, due to a bet Nilsson had made with RCA. Nilsson had wagered that he could produce the company's cheapest video for $5,000. If RCA didn't consider it the best video they had ever seen, the bet would be off. However, if they thought it was their best, they would triple the television airtime for "Kojak Columbo".

Nilsson's idea was to demonstrate his basketball skills, honed in his teenage years, by attempting a mid-court shot on an NBA basketball court. Ringo Starr, the sole audience member sitting high in the bleachers, agreed to applaud if Nilsson succeeded. Starr, situated high up in the empty auditorium, called out to Dorfman to film the first shot, knowing Nilsson's knack for spontaneous performances. Nilsson, pretending to be a lost tourist, entered the court, picked up the ball, dribbled to the sideline, and released the shot. He made it on the first take, but Dorfman, unaware of Starr's call, did not capture the shot. While Nilsson's next twenty-two attempts were unsuccessful, he came close, hitting the rim of the basket on eighteen occasions. The Los Angeles Forum had allowed the video to be filmed there for $800 for three hours, after hearing about Nilsson's bet with RCA. As time was running out, Nilsson made the shot again, but by this time Ringo Starr had fallen asleep. The final film features a single, uninterrupted sequence of Nilsson's shot taking a full eight seconds to land perfectly in the net as Starr sleeps in the bleachers. The final score "Nilsson 1: RCA 0" is displayed on the scoreboard. Dorfman managed to complete the entire production for $3,000, winning Nilsson's bet. However, although RCA had promised to triple the airtime for "Kojak Columbo", Nilsson later discovered they had not fulfilled their commitment when he requested the viewing figures.

== Painting ==
In 1946, Dorfman was awarded a scholarship to the École des Beaux-Arts and the Académie Julian in Paris, where he studied painting and fresco. In 1954, he settled in the artist colony of St Ives in Cornwall, England, where he worked as a studio assistant to the prominent English artist and sculptor Dame Barbara Hepworth, and continued to develop his own art.

Dorfman was a member of the Penwith Society of Arts, a group that sought to explore new artistic directions beyond the confines of the traditional St Ives Society of Artists. This society became a centre for modern and abstract developments in British art from the 1940s to the 1960s. His early paintings are characterized by hard-edged abstraction, vibrant flat colors, and evocative titles like "Vertical St. Ives (Paul)," "Blue and Brown Study," and "Composition with Four Rectangles." One of his notable works from 1954, "Across the Bay", showcases abstracted hard-edge waves. Dorfman's work was exhibited alongside work from fellow abstract artists such as Barbara Hepworth, Ben Nicholson, Wilhelmina Barns-Graham, Paul Feiler, Sir Terry Frost, Patrick Heron, Roger Hilton, and Bryan Wynter, and members of the Crypt Group like Peter Lanyon and Sven Berlin.

Following a successful career as a television director and producer, Dorfman redirected his focus towards painting in 1996. His later works took on a more lyrical and painterly quality, often drawing inspiration from music. Examples of this inspiration are seen in works titled "Good Vibrations", "La Bamba" and "Imagine." Dorfman exhibits his paintings at The Lodge gallery in Los Angeles.

== Personal life ==
Dorfman has two sons. He relocated to Los Angeles in 1974. Dorfman has been in a long-term relationship with actress and model Barbara Flood for over forty years. The couple were featured by Nowness in the documentary short Barbara and Stanley: A Modern Romance, directed by Rachel Fleit.

== Filmography ==
=== Television series ===
- Top of the Pops – Creator, Director, Producer (1968 -1974)
- In Concert (BBC Series) – Creator, Director, Producer (1970-1974)
- Sounds for Saturday – Creator, Director, Producer (1972)
- In Concert (American TV series) – Director (1974-1976)
- BBC Show of the Week – Director, Producer (1968 -1971)
- The Bobbie Gentry Show – Director, Producer (1968 -1971)
- Dusty: with Dusty Springfield – Director, Producer (1966-1667)
- The Jack Jones Show – Director (1973-1978)
- Mary: Rhymes and Reasons – Director, Producer (1972)
- Julie Felix – Director, Producer (1970)
- Once More with Felix – Producer (1967–1968)
- Happening For Lulu – Director, Producer (1968 -1969)
- Brewhouse Jazz – Director (1993)
- The Talk of the Town: Glen Campbell – Producer (1972)
- The Talk of the Town: Nancy Wilson – Producer (1972)
- The Price of Fame or Fame at any Price – Producer (1969–1970)
- Peter Sarstedt – Producer (1969)
- The Roy Castle Show – Director (1965)
- They Sold a Million – Producer (1973)
- The Black and White Minstrel Show – Production Designer (1959–1963)
- The Dick Emery Show – Production Designer (1963)
- Comedy Playhouse – Production Designer (1963)
- The Country and Western Show – Production Designer (1963)
- The Charlie Chester Music Hall – Production Designer (1961)
- It's a Square World – Production Designer (1961)
- Be My Guest – Production Designer (1961)
- Showtime – Production Designer (1960)
- Crackerjack! – Production Designer (1959)

=== Television specials ===
- Woodstock '99 – Director (1999)
- Woodstock '94 – Director (1994)
- Frank Sinatra: In Concert at the Royal Festival Hall – Director (1970)
- Pop Go the Sixties! – Director (1969)
- Leonard Cohen sings Leonard Cohen – Director, Producer (1968)
- Elton John: In Concert – Director, Producer (1970)
- The Carpenters – Director (1971)
- Rock Masters: Neil Young in Concert – Director, Producer (1971)
- Rock Masters: Cat Stevens in Concert – Director, Producer (1971)
- A Little Touch of Schmilsson in the Night – Director, Producer (1973)
- Richie Havens in Concert – Director, Producer (1974)
- Giselle (Ballet) – Rudolf Nureyev – Director, Producer (1979)
- Linda Ronstadt in Concert – Director, Producer (1980)
- Eric Clapton & friends: The A.R.M.S. benefit concert from London – Director (1984)
- Cinemax Sessions:Chet Atkins: Certified Guitar Player – Director (1986)
- Chet Atkins And Friends, Music From The Heart – Director (1987)
- Dizzy Gillespie Live at the Royal Festival Hall – Director (1989)
- Wolf Trap Presents Victor Borge: An 80th Birthday Celebration – Director, Producer (1990)
- Kitaro: An Enchanted Evening – Director (1995)
- The Kennedy Center Presents: A Tribute to Muddy Waters: King of the Blues – Director (1998)
- The 13th Annual Genesis Awards – Director (1999)
- The Paris Concert for Amnesty International – Director (1999)
- George Benson: Absolutely Live – Director (2000)
- The 15th Annual Genesis Awards – Director (2001)
- Bruce Hornsby & Friends – Director (2004)
- Sixth Van Cliburn International Piano Competition – Director (1981)
- An Evening with Robert Helpmann – Production Designer (1963)
- An Evening with Nat King Cole – Production Designer (1963)
- Meet Sammy Davis Jr. – Production Designer (1963)

=== Music videos ===
- "Grow Old with Me" – John Lennon – Director (1984)
- "Loneliness" – Harry Nilsson – Director (1984)
- "Can't Find Love" – Jefferson Starship – Director (1983)
- "Heart of Glass" – Blondie – Director (1978)
- "Heroes" – David Bowie – Director (1977)
- "Be My Wife" – David Bowie – Director (1977)
- "Only You" – Ringo Starr – Director (1974)
- "Kojak Columbo" – Harry Nilsson – Director (1974)
- "Who Done It?" – Harry Nilsson – Director (1977)
- "Duit on Mon Dei" – Harry Nilsson – Director (1975)
- "Pretty Woman" – Roy Orbison – Director, promotional video for Top of the Pops (1964)
- "How Many More Times" – Led Zeppelin – Director, Live at The Royal Albert Hall (1970)
- "Dazed and Confused" – Led Zeppelin – Director, Live at The Royal Albert Hall (1970)
- " What Is and What Should Never Be" – Led Zeppelin – Director, Live at The Royal Albert Hall (1970)

=== DVD & Video ===
- Led Zeppelin DVD – Director, Live at the Royal Albert Hall footage (1970)
- Dusty Springfield: Live at the BBC – Director (2007)
- Blondie: Video Hits – Director (2005)
- Glen Campbell In Concert (2002)
- Dizzy Gillespie and the United Nations Orchestra: Live at the Royal Festival Hall – Director (1989)
- Jefferson Starship: The Definitive Concert – Director (1984)
- Bowie – The Video Collection – Director (1983)
- Gillespie Dizzy Dream Band Jazz America – Director (1982)
- George Winston: Seasons in Concert – Director (1996)
- GRP All-Stars: Live from the Record Plant – Director, Producer (1985)
- Lee Ritenour & Dave Grusin Live from the Record Plant – Director, Producer (1985)
- Lee Ritenour Live – Director (1984)
- Water's Path – Director (1984)

=== Movies ===
- A Life in the Blues: Charles Brown – Director (1990)
- Volunteer Jam – Director (1976)
- Blast! – Director (2000)
- The Yeomen of the Guard – Director, Producer (1979)
- Swingers' Paradise – Production Designer (1964)
- Pan's People in Concert – Producer (1974)
- Crystal Cave – Producer (1996)
- Night of Nights – Director (1970)
- Pop Go the Sixties! – Director (1969)
- The Brockenstein Affair – Production Designer (1962)

=== Documentaries ===
- Ringo Starr Going Home – Director, Producer (1993)
- Top of the Pops: The True Story (2001) – Self, Producer (1979)
- The Music of Nilsson – Producer (1971)
- John Denver: Country Boy – Self (2013)
- Who Is Harry Nilsson (And Why Is Everybody Talkin' About Him?) – Self (2010)
- Legends – Self (2008)
