= Sinatra: London =

Box set by Frank Sinatra
- Released: December 9, 2014
- Recorded: June 1962, November 16, 1970, September 21, 1984
- Label: Universal

Frank Sinatra chronology
Sinatra, With Love (2014)	Sinatra: London (2014)	Ultimate Sinatra (2015)

Professional ratings
Review scores
Source	Rating
The Guardian	3/5 stars
PopMatters	9/10
Record Collector	3/5 stars
Sarasota Herald-Tribune	B+

Sinatra: London is a 3CD & 1DVD Frank Sinatra box set released on November 25, 2014. It is the third in a series of city-themed box sets following Vegas and New York. The set includes the 1962 album Sinatra Sings Great Songs from Great Britain as recorded in London, as well as unreleased outtake material from those sessions and spoken introductions for each song intended for a BBC radio special. The live material consists of a 1953 session from BBC Radio's The Show Band Show, a full concert recorded in 1984 at the Royal Albert Hall, and two concerts on the DVD, both recorded at the Royal Festival Hall in 1962 and 1970. The liner notes are written by Ken Barnes.

== Track listing ==
=== Disc 1: Great Songs from Great Britain ===
- Originally recorded at CTS Studios in Bayswater, London, England, June 1962 with Robert Farnon and His Orchestra
- Arranged & Conducted by Robert Farnon
1. "The Very Thought of You" (Ray Noble)
2. "We'll Gather Lilacs in the Spring" (Ivor Novello)
3. "If I Had You" (Jimmy Campbell, Reginald Connelly, Ted Shapiro)
4. "Now Is the Hour" (Maewa Kaihan, Clement Scott, Dorothy Stewart)
5. "The Gypsy" (Billy Reid)
6. "Roses of Picardy" (Frederic E. Weatherly, Haydn Wood)
7. "A Nightingale Sang in Berkeley Square" (Eric Maschwitz, Manning Sherwin)
8. "A Garden in the Rain" (James Dyrenforth, Carroll Gibbons)
9. "London by Night" (Carroll Coates)
10. "We'll Meet Again" (Hughie Charles, Ross Parker)
11. "I'll Follow My Secret Heart" (Noël Coward)
12. BBC Light Programme Introduction
13. Sinatra on "A Nightingale Sang in Berkeley Square"
14. Sinatra on "The Gypsy"
15. Sinatra on "We'll Meet Again"
16. Sinatra on "A Garden in the Rain"
17. Sinatra on "I'll Follow My Secret Heart"
18. Sinatra on "The Very Thought of You"
19. Sinatra on "If I Had You"
20. Sinatra on "We'll Gather Lilacs"
21. Sinatra on "Now is the Hour"
22. Sinatra on "London by Night"
23. End Credit

=== Disc 2: Sessions ===
1. "The Very Thought of You"
2. "A Garden in the Rain"
3. "London by Night"
4. "The Gypsy"
5. "A Nightingale Sang in Berkeley Square"
6. "We'll Meet Again"
7. "I've Got the World on a String / Day In, Day Out / London by Night" (Harold Arlen, Ted Kohler / Rube Bloom, Johnny Mercer / Coates)
- Tracks 1–6: Session material from the "Great Songs from Great Britain" album recordings (June 1962), Arranged & Conducted by Robert Farnon
- Track 7: A medley of previously unreleased songs from the BBC's "Show Band Show", transmitted July 16, 1953, during Frank's tour of Britain in 1953.

=== Disc 3: Live at the Royal Albert Hall, 1984 ===
- Recorded at The Royal Albert Hall, London, England (September 21, 1984)
- Conducted by Joe Parnello
1. "Fly Me to the Moon (In Other Words)" (Bart Howard)
2. "The Lady Is a Tramp" (Richard Rodgers, Lorenz Hart)
3. "Come Rain or Come Shine" (Arlen, Mercer)
4. "This Is All I Ask" (Gordon Jenkins)
5. "L.A. Is My Lady" (Alan and Marilyn Bergman, Quincy Jones, Peggy Lipton Jones)
6. "Pennies from Heaven" (Johnny Burke, Arthur Johnston)
7. Monologue
8. "Luck Be a Lady" (Frank Loesser)
9. "My Way" (Paul Anka, Claude François, Gilles Thibaut, Jacques Revaux)
10. "Here's to the Band" (Sharman Howe, Alfred Nittoli, Artie Schroeck)
11. "These Foolish Things (Remind Me of You)" (Jack Strachey, Harry Link, Holt Marvell)
12. "Guess I'll Hang My Tears Out to Dry" (Sammy Cahn, Jule Styne)
13. "Don't Worry 'Bout Me" (Bloom, Koehler)
14. "Theme from New York, New York" (Fred Ebb, John Kander)
15. "Strangers in the Night" (Bert Kaempfert, Charles Singleton, Eddie Snyder)
16. "Mack the Knife" (Marc Blitzstein, Bertolt Brecht, Kurt Weill)
17. Bows: "You Are There" (Jenkins)

=== Disc 4 (DVD): Live at the Royal Festival Hall ===
==== 1962 ====
- Live at Royal Festival Hall, June 1, 1962
- Conducted by Bill Miller
1. Introduction
2. "Goody Goody" (Matty Malneck, Mercer)
3. "Imagination" (Burke, Jimmy Van Heusen)
4. "At Long Last Love" (Cole Porter)
5. "Moonlight in Vermont" (John Blackburn, Karl Suessdorf)
6. "Without a Song" (Vincent Youmans, Billy Rose, Edward Eliscu)
7. "Day In, Day Out"
8. "The Moon Was Yellow (And the Night Is Young)" (Fred E. Ahlert, Edgar Leslie)
9. "I've Got You Under My Skin" (Porter)
10. "I Get a Kick Out of You" (Porter)
11. "The Second Time Around" (Cahn, Van Heusen)
12. "Too Marvelous for Words" (Mercer, Richard A. Whiting)
13. "My Funny Valentine" (Rodgers, Hart)
14. "In the Still of the Night" (Porter)
15. "My Blue Heaven" (Walter Donaldson, George A. Whiting)
16. "April in Paris" (Vernon Duke, E.Y. Harburg)
17. "You're Nobody till Somebody Loves You" (Page Cavanaugh, Russ Morgan, Larry Stock)
18. Monologue and Band Introductions
19. "They Can't Take That Away from Me" (George Gershwin, Ira Gershwin)
20. "All the Way" (Cahn, Jimmy Van Heusen)
21. "Chicago (That Toddlin' Town)" (Fred Fisher)
22. "Night and Day" (Porter)
23. "Autumn Leaves" (Jacques Prévert, Mercer, Joseph Kosma)
24. "I Could Have Danced All Night" (Alan Jay Lerner, Frederick Loewe)
25. "One for My Baby (and One More for the Road)" (Arlen, Mercer)
26. "A Foggy Day" (G. Gershwin, I. Gershwin)
27. "The Lady Is a Tramp"
28. Bows
29. "Ol' Man River" (Oscar Hammerstein II, Jerome Kern)
30. "You Make Me Feel So Young" (Mack Gordon, Josef Myrow)
31. "Nancy (With the Laughing Face)" (Phil Silvers, Van Heusen) – 2:14
32. "Come Fly with Me" (Cahn, Van Heusen)
33. Bows

==== 1970 ====
- Recorded at Royal Festival Hall, London, England (November 16, 1970)
- Recorded for Night of Nights on BBC TV (first broadcast on November 22, 1970)
- Conducted by Bill Miller
1. "You Make Me Feel So Young"
2. "Pennies from Heaven"
3. "I've Got You Under My Skin"
4. "Something" (George Harrison)
5. "The Lady Is a Tramp"
6. I Get Along Without You Very Well (Hoagy Carmichael)
7. "Didn't We?" (Jimmy Webb)
8. "One for My Baby (and One More for the Road)"
9. "A Foggy Day" (previously unreleased bonus performance)
10. "I Will Drink the Wine" (Paul Ryan)
11. "I Have Dreamed" (Rodgers, Hammerstein II)
12. "My Kind of Town" (Cahn, Van Heusen)
13. "My Way"

== Personnel ==
- Frank Sinatra – vocals
- Robert Farnon and His Orchestra
- Bill Miller, Joe Parnello – piano, conductor
- Ralph Peña, Don Baldini – double bass
- Irv Cottler – drums
- Emil Richards – vibraphone
- Tony Mottola, Al Viola – guitar
- Harry Klee – saxophone, flute
- Don Baldini – double bass
