= Sinatra (TV program) =

Video by Frank Sinatra
- Released: 1969
- Recorded: August 30–31, 1969
- Genres: Jazz; Vocal
- Length: 50:00
- Label: Warner Bros. Records

Frank Sinatra chronology
Francis Albert Sinatra Does His Thing (1968)	Sinatra (1969)	Sinatra in Concert (1971)

Sinatra: Featuring Don Costa and His Orchestra is a 1969 Emmy nominated television special starring Frank Sinatra, broadcast Wednesday, November 5, 1969, on CBS.

== Set list ==
1. "For Once in My Life" (Ron Miller, Orlando Murden)
2. "Please Be Kind" (Saul Chaplin, Sammy Cahn)
3. "My Way" (Paul Anka, Claude François, Jacques Revaux, Gilles Thibault)
4. Film clip medley with song highlights of: "I Couldn't Sleep a Wink Last Night"/"You're Sensational"/"All the Way"/"(Love Is) The Tender Trap" (Harold Adamson, Jimmy McHugh)/(Cole Porter)/(Cahn, Jimmy Van Heusen)/(Cahn, Van Heusen)
5. "Little Green Apples" (Bobby Russell)
6. "Out Beyond the Window" (Rod McKuen)
7. "A Man Alone" (McKuen)
8. "Didn't We?" (Jimmy Webb)
9. "Forget to Remember" (Victoria Pike, Teddy Randazzo)
10. "Fly Me to the Moon" (Bart Howard)
11. "Street of Dreams" (Sam M. Lewis, Victor Young)
12. "Love's Been Good to Me" (McKuen)
13. "Goin' Out of My Head" (Randazzo, Bobby Weinstein)
14. "My Kind of Town" (Cahn, Van Heusen)

== Personnel ==
- Director: Tim Kiley
- Musical Director: Don Costa
- Music Supervisor: Sonny Burke
- Music Coordinators: Irving Weiss, Bill Miller
- Executive Producer: Frank Sinatra
- Producer: Carolyn Raskin
- Writer: Sheldon Keller
