= Night of Nights =

Night of Nights may refer to:

- Her Night of Nights, a 1922 film
- The Night of Nights, a 1939 film
- Night of Nights (Sinatra concert), a 1970 concert at the Royal Festival Hall
- Night of Nights... Live!, a 2002 album by The Seekers
- "Night of Nights", a 2007 Touhou Project song remix by COOL&CREATE
- The Academy Awards
