= Ultimate Christmas =

Ultimate Christmas may refer to:

- Ultimate Christmas (The Beach Boys album), 1998
- Ultimate Christmas (Frank Sinatra album), 2017
