= The Yeomen of the Guard (film) =

The Yeoman of the Guard is a 1978 British TV version of Gilbert and Sullivan's Savoy opera The Yeomen of the Guard.

It was a filmed version of a 1978 stage production which was produced in the Tower of London during the City of London Festival at a budget of £150,000.

== Cast ==
- Tommy Steele as Jack Point
- Laureen Livingstone as Elsie Maynard
- Paul Hudson as Sergeant Meryll
- Della Jones as Phoebe Meryll
- Anne Collins as Dame Carruthers
- Hilary Western as Kate Carruthers
- Dennis Wicks as Wilfred Shadbolt
- David Fieldsend as Leonard Meryll
- Tom McDonnell as Sir Richard Cholmondley
- Terry Jenkins as Colonel Fairfax

== Production ==
The film was directed and produced by Stanley Dorfman for ATV. The choreography was by Gillian Lynne. Arthur Sullivan's score was performed by the New World Philharmonic Orchestra, conducted by David Lloyd-Jones.
