= Christmas with Sinatra & Friends =

Compilation album by Frank Sinatra
- Released: October 6, 2009
- Recorded: 1950s–1960s, 1975
- Genre: Vocal jazz; traditional pop
- Label: Concord Records

Frank Sinatra chronology
Sinatra: Collector's Edition (2009)	Christmas with Sinatra & Friends (2009)	Sinatra: New York (2009)

Professional ratings
Review scores
Source	Rating
Allmusic	3/5 stars

Christmas with Sinatra & Friends is a 2009 compilation album by Frank Sinatra.

Eight Sinatra songs are taken from A Jolly Christmas from Frank Sinatra and 12 Songs of Christmas. The remaining four tracks feature Rosemary Clooney ("White Christmas"), Mel Tormé ("The Christmas Song [Chestnuts Roasting on an Open Fire]"), Tony Bennett and Bill Evans ("A Child Is Born"), and Ray Charles and Betty Carter ("Baby, It's Cold Outside").

== Track listing ==
1. "The Christmas Waltz" (Sammy Cahn, Jule Styne)
2. "Santa Claus Is Coming to Town" (John Frederick Coots, Haven Gillespie)
3. "The Christmas Song (Chestnuts Roasting on an Open Fire)" (Bob Wells, Mel Tormé)
4. "I Heard the Bells on Christmas Day" (Henry Wadsworth Longfellow, Johnny Marks)
5. "The Little Drummer Boy" (Katherine K. Davis)
6. "A Child Is Born" (Thad Jones, Mel Lewis)
7. "Mistletoe and Holly" (Hank Sanicola, Frank Sinatra, Doc Stanford)
8. "An Old-Fashioned Christmas" (Cahn, Jimmy Van Heusen)
9. "White Christmas" (Irving Berlin)
10. "Whatever Happened to Christmas?" (Jimmy Webb)
11. "Baby, It's Cold Outside" (Frank Loesser)
12. "Christmas Memories" (Alan Bergman, Marilyn Bergman, Don Costa)

== Personnel ==
- Tony Bennett - Track 6
- Betty Carter - Track 11
- Ray Charles - Track 11
- Rosemary Clooney - Track 9
- Bill Evans - Track 6
- Frank Sinatra - Tracks 1–2, 4–5, 7–8, 10, 12
- Mel Tormé - Track 3
- Fred Waring & His Pennsylvanians - 4–5, 8
- The Jimmy Joyce Singers - Tracks 1, 10
