= Sinatra in Concert at Royal Festival Hall =

- Cover of U.S. DVD issued in 1999
- Also known as: Sinatra in Concert at Royal Festival Hall
- Genre: Musical special
- Directed by: Stanley Dorfman
- Starring: Frank Sinatra; Grace Kelly
- Country of origin: United Kingdom
- Original language: English

Production
- Producer: Harold Davison
- Running time: 85 minutes (original TV broadcast with Bob Hope); 50 minutes (home video of Sinatra portion)

Original release
- Network: BBC Television
- Release: 22 November 1970

Related
- Sinatra; Magnavox Presents Frank Sinatra; Sinatra: London

Sinatra in Concert at Royal Festival Hall, originally titled and broadcast as Night of Nights, is a BBC television special starring Frank Sinatra in concert at London's Royal Festival Hall filmed on 16 November 1970, the day before he was to leave show business.

== Description ==
The concert was introduced by Princess Grace of Monaco, the former Grace Kelly, who had co-starred with Sinatra in the 1956 film High Society, prior to her marriage to Rainier III, Prince of Monaco later that year. Princess Grace was a stand-in for Noël Coward, who had been scheduled to appear but was ill.

The television special was directed by Stanley Dorfman and produced by Harold Davison, and the musical direction and conducting was by Bill Miller. The filmed concert was the second night of a two-night charity event to raise money for the United World Colleges Fund, and also featured the comedian Bob Hope. The programme was broadcast in the UK on BBC Television on 22 November 1970.

Ticket sales from Sinatra's appearance raised over £100,000 for the United World Colleges Fund.

Dorfman recalled in a 2018 interview in Shindig! magazine that Sinatra had told him "Whatever you do is up to you, I want one camera on my face all the time, so I know when I want to look at the two or three people who are sitting at home, I’m going to be looking into the camera." Dorfman went on to use this technique when filming other artists.

Sinatra had previously done a charity concert at the Royal Festival Hall, at midnight on June 1, 1962. He was accompanied in that concert by a sextet (also conducted by Miller) rather than an orchestra. This concert was broadcast the following evening on ITV under the title This Is Sinatra! Both the 1962 and 1970 concerts are included in the DVD of the box set Sinatra: London.

== Set list ==
1. "You Make Me Feel So Young"
2. "Pennies from Heaven"
3. "I've Got You Under My Skin"
4. ”Something”
5. "The Lady Is a Tramp
6. "I Get Along Without You Very Well (Except Sometimes)"
7. "Didn't We"
8. "One For My Baby"
9. "A Foggy Day" – edited from standalone home video releases; only on DVD in Sinatra: London box set
10. "I Will Drink the Wine"
11. "I Have Dreamed"
12. "My Kind of Town"
13. "My Way"

== Personnel ==
- Bill Miller - Piano, Conductor
- Irv Cottler - Drums
