= In Concert (British TV series) =

British television series

- Created by: Stanley Dorfman
- Directed by: Stanley Dorfman
- Country of origin: United Kingdom

Production
- Producer: Stanley Dorfman

Original release
- Network: BBC Two
- Release: 9 October 1970 – 2 September 1976

In Concert (also known as BBC In Concert) is a British music television series, broadcast live by the BBC between 1970 and 1976. Each episode consists of a one-hour live performance by a single singer songwriter. The series premiered on 9 October 1970 on BBC Two. It was created, produced, and directed by Stanley Dorfman.

== Overview ==
According to The Guardian newspaper in 1974, In Concert was the only music television program that "produced television ideas". During its time, the format revolutionized the portrayal of singer-songwriters by establishing them as deserving of full attention and able to carry an entire TV episode without distraction. The audience were often seated behind the performers, fostering an atmosphere akin to sitting in on an intimate session rather than a traditional stage performance.

In order of appearance the In Concert series includes individual episodes featuring: Joni Mitchell, Elton John, Bobbie Gentry, Randy Newman, Mason Williams, Crosby and Nash, James Taylor, Tony Joe White, Alan Price, Mac Davis, Tom Paxton, Donovan, Neil Young, Ray Stevens, Guy Fletcher, Labi Siffre, Gallagher and Lyle, Neil Diamond, Mary Travers, Glen Campbell, Carole King, The Pentangle, The Carpenters, Laura Nyro, Cat Stevens, Lesley Duncan, Jim Webb, Gilbert O'Sullivan, Harry Nilsson, Melanie, David Gates, Gordon Lightfoot, The Corries, Paul Williams, Stephen Stills Manassas, Linda Lewis, David Buskin, 3 Dog Night, Kris Kristofferson, Judee Sill, Georgia Brown, Chuck Berry, The Dubliners, John Denver, Bonnie Koloc, The Mahavishnu Orchestra, Plainsong, John Prine, Buddy Rich and his Orchestra, Don McLean, The Kinks, Richie Havens, The Eagles, Steeleye Span, Martin Mull, John Williams, America, Al Green, Leo Sayer, The Pointer Sisters, David Clayton-Thomas Peter Skellern, Billy Preston, Jimmy Cliff, Ronnie Lane, Ravi Shankar, Jonny Mercer, Stomu Yamash'ta's East Wind, Sonny Terry and Brownie McGhee, Oscar Peterson, and others.

== Background ==
In Concert picked up on and followed the format Dorfman had created on a BBC television special he had filmed on 20 March 1968 featuring Leonard Cohen, entitled Leonard Cohen sings Leonard Cohen. It was filmed in a single day in front of a small studio audience at the Paris Theatre in London, and was broadcast in two parts in August and September 1968. Following its success, Dorfman opted for the title in Concert to encompass the diverse range of performers he would showcase in the series.

The first episode of In Concert premiered on 9 October 1970 on BBC Two, it featured Joni Mitchell in concert playing dulcimer, piano and guitar, and singing songs that included "California", a year before Mitchell first released it on her 1971 album Blue. The final episode was Johnny Mercer In Concert in 1975.

The third episode was first broadcast on 23 October 1970, and featured the little known singer at the time, Elton John, whose first album Empty Sky released the year prior was a commercial failure, selling approximately 4,000 copies. Among the songs John performed was "Your Song", which he then released as a single three days later on 26 October becoming his first top ten in both the UK and the US.

On 6 November 1971, the Carpenters performed their debut BBC concert on In Concert, singing songs such as "Close to You", "Superstar" and "We've Only Just Begun". The episode has continued to be broadcast on the BBC since under the alternate name The Carpenters at the BBC. In Concert was Richard and Karen Carpenter's first featured appearance on television, five years prior to The Carpenters' Very First TV Special produced in the US which aired on 8 December 1976.

On 15 July 1971, Carole King was featured on an episode of In Concert, where she performed songs from her new album Tapestry. According to one of the BBC Genome Project's many listings for the episode, which state conflicting "first broadcast" dates, it first aired on 2 October that year. Prior to her performance on the series, King had achieved moderate success as a solo artist, and the musical group Tapestry had released two albums, however, Tapestry went on to spend 15 consecutive weeks at No. 1 on the Billboard 200, setting a new record for the longest reign by a female solo artist at that time. In 2021, American record label Legacy Recordings released Carole King in Concert – Live at the BBC 1971, a 12" vinyl recording of King's 1971 In Concert performance.

Known as "the man the stars really trusted", Dorfman persuaded artists who would not otherwise go on television to appear on the series. Laura Nyro who avoided television shows, believing that they were "unlikely to provide the right atmosphere for the serious business of making good music", made her first television appearance on 20 Nov 1971 In Concert. Cat Stevens was featured on an episode of In Concert on 27 November 1971, after he had left the music scene due to ill health. Nancy Wilson agreed to do the show for Dorfman without meeting him. Initially, Harry Nilsson, who didn't perform in front of people, refused to do the series, but agreed when Dorfman told him they could do a concert appearance that was not in reality a concert, without an audience. Nilsson's In Concert appearance became one of only two concerts performed by Nilsson during his career, either in person or on television. Dorfman manufactured the appearance of an audience in the BBC 2,000 capacity Television Theatre, by cutting in footage from previous In Concert shows. Between songs, Nilsson took bows and made acknowledgments as if a real crowd was present.

For the Nilsson In Concert episode, Dorfman pushed the technology of the time to the limit and superimposed footage of Nilsson that was shot against a blue background, which had been done on the news, but never before on a music television program. By manually rolling back the film back, shooting the next shot on the same roll of film, rolling the film back again, and shooting again, Dorfman created footage of Nilsson sitting next to himself at the piano singing the Everly Brothers' "Walk Right Back" with himself in harmony, as a third Nilsson interpolated the lyrics from Everly Brother's "Cathy's Clown" with his head visible above the piano, before Nilsson one and two sing in underlying harmony, Nilsson two and three break into a brief harmonica duet, and the song concludes with the three Nilssons singing "Let the Good Times Roll" in perfect sync. Later, three versions of Nilsson dressed in a gorilla suit are featured as he sings "Coconut", however Dorfman and Nilsson forgot to get him take off the gorilla's head, which led to the misconception that Nilsson may have been three extras or dancers, and the feat of Nilsson singing and performing the song three times in perfect sync does not come across as a result.

Dorfman directed and produced the In Concert series on the BBC through 1974, after which he relocated to Los Angeles to direct a separate series with the same name, the American TV Series In Concert which featured rock acts, produced by Dick Clark.
