= Johnnie Stewart =

British television producer (1917–2005)

- Born: Lorn Alastair Stewart; 7 November 1917; Tonbridge, Kent, England
- Died: 30 April 2005 (aged 87); East Dereham, Norfolk, England
- Occupation: Television producer

Lorn Alastair "Johnnie" Stewart (7 November 1917 – 29 April 2005) was a British television producer who worked for the BBC. In 1964, he co-created and co-produced the long-running music programme Top of the Pops with Stanley Dorfman and Bill Cotton. Stewart co-produced Top of the Pops with Dorfman until 1969, when Stewart was replaced by Mel Cornish as co-producer.

== Early life ==
Born as Lorn Alastair Stewart, in Tonbridge, Kent, Stewart was the son of Dr Haldane Campbell Stewart, who was also musical but in a different sphere – he was organist and choirmaster at Magdalen College, Oxford, the director of music at the Tonbridge School, Kent, and also notable as a cricketer at Kent County Cricket Club. As a child, Stewart's family played as a string quartet, with Stewart and his sister Jean playing violin, his father playing viola, and his mother playing cello. His sister Jean went on to become a noted performer on viola, performing as a soloist, and in chamber music and orchestras. She performed with the Menges Quartet, the London Bach Orchestra and the English Baroque Soloists. Stewart's grandfather, John Stewart, was the sixth Baron Appin, and a barrister of Lincoln's Inn.

== Career ==
Stewart started off his entertainment career in the BBC radio sound effects department in the late 1930s. During the Second World War he worked in the Middle East as a wireless operator and later worked in intelligence. After the war, in 1946, he married Sheila Williamson. He returned to the BBC and produced a number of radio music programmes, which included Sing It Again and BBC Jazz Club. He was able to sign up Frank Sinatra for a fee of only fifty pounds as a guest for Cyril Stapleton's Show Band Show. In 1958 he produced Juke Box Jury for BBC Television.

Continuing the popular musical theme, in 1963 the BBC recorded a pilot chart show, which Stewart produced. Originally called The Teen and Twenty Record Club, it emerged onto the UK screens as Top of the Pops, which continued on the air until 2006. Its initial presenters, on a rotational basis, were Jimmy Savile, David Jacobs, Alan Freeman and Pete Murray. Samantha Juste, one of the programme's assistants, sat alongside them and placed the records on a turntable. Stewart remained as the co-producer of the programme with Stanley Dorfman until he was succeeded by Mel Cornish in 1969 who was later replaced by Robin Nash in 1973.

In 1970, he produced the BBC/ZDF TV show Pop Go The Sixties, broadcast across Europe on 1 January 1970.

== Later life ==
Stewart retired to Ibiza but later returned to the UK when his health deteriorated. He died on 30 April 2005 in East Dereham, Norfolk, aged 87. He was played by Julian Rhind-Tutt in The Reckoning (2023), a BBC One dramatization of the crimes of Jimmy Savile.
