= Sinatra, with Love =

Sinatra, With Love

Compilation album by Frank Sinatra
- Released: January 28, 2014
- Length: 46:59
- Label: Universal Records

Frank Sinatra chronology
Best of Duets (2013)	Sinatra, With Love (2014)	Sinatra: London (2014)

Sinatra, With Love is a 2014 compilation album by Frank Sinatra, consisting of 16 romance songs from Capitol Records and Reprise Records.

== Track listing ==
1. "Moonlight Becomes You" (Johnny Burke, Jimmy Van Heusen) – 2:46
2. "Love is Here to Stay" (George Gershwin, Ira Gershwin) - 2:42
3. "Just One of Those Things" (Cole Porter) – 3:14
4. "Misty" (Erroll Garner, Burke) – 2:41
5. "Nice 'n' Easy" (Alan Bergman, Marilyn Keith, Lew Spence) – 2:45
6. "It Could Happen to You" (Burke, Van Heusen) – 3:16
7. "The Way You Look Tonight" (Jerome Kern, Dorothy Fields) - 3:22
8. "Love Looks So Well On You" (Spence, Keith, Bergman) - 2:41
9. "(Love Is) The Tender Trap" (Sammy Cahn, Van Heusen) – 3:00
10. "I Love You" (Porter) – 2:16
11. "The Look of Love" (Cahn, Van Heusen) – 2:43
12. "Something's Gotta Give" (Johnny Mercer) – 2:38
13. "From This Moment On" (Porter) - 3:50
14. "Wave" (Antonio Carlos Jobim) – 3:25
15. "It Had to Be You" (Isham Jones, Gus Kahn) - 3:53
16. "My Foolish Heart" (Ned Washington, Victor Young) - 2:47
