= Francis Albert Sinatra Does His Thing =

- DVD cover
- Directed by: Clark Jones
- Starring: Frank Sinatra; Diahann Carroll; The 5th Dimension
- Country of origin: United States
- Original language: English

Production
- Producer: Ernest Chambers Saul Illson (producer)
- Production locations: Color City, Burbank, California
- Camera setup: Multiple
- Running time: 51 minutes

Original release
- Network: CBS
- Release: November 25, 1968

Related
- A Man and His Music + Ella + Jobim (November 13, 1967); Sinatra (November 5, 1969); Ol' Blue Eyes Is Back (November 18, 1973)

Francis Albert Sinatra Does His Thing is a television special starring Frank Sinatra, Diahann Carroll and The 5th Dimension recorded in November 1968 and broadcast on CBS. The title references Sinatra's attempts at engaging with the youth culture of the late 1960s. Don Costa was the bandleader. This special was nominated for an Emmy for Outstanding Comedy, Variety or Musical Special.

Sinatra made the cover of TV Guide who featured this special in their Nov. '68 edition

== Set list ==
- "Hello, Young Lovers"
- "Baubles, Bangles and Beads"
- "Cycles"
- "Music That Makes Me Dance" - Diahann Carroll
- "Where Am I Going" - Diahann Carroll
- Medley with Diahann Carroll: "Diane"/"Deep River" (Instrumental)/"Sometimes I Feel Like a Motherless Child"/"The Lonesome Road"/"Nobody Knows the Trouble I've Seen"/"Amen"
- Medley: "Glad to Be Unhappy"/"Here's That Rainy Day"/"It Never Entered My Mind"/"Gone with the Wind"
- "It's a Great Life" - The 5th Dimension
- "Stoned Soul Picnic" - The 5th Dimension
- "Sweet Blindness" - with The 5th Dimension
- "Nice 'n' Easy"
- "(How Little It Matters) How Little We Know"
- "Lost In the Stars"
- "Angel Eyes"
- "Put Your Dreams Away"

All songs performed by Frank Sinatra unless otherwise noted.
