= Pop Go The Sixties =

- Also known as: Pop Go The 60s!
- Genre: Music
- Directed by: Stanley Dorfman
- Presented by: Jimmy Savile & Elfi von Kalckreuth
- Countries of origin: United Kingdom; West Germany
- Original languages: English; German

Production
- Executive producer: Johnnie Stewart
- Producers: Johnnie Stewart; Klaus Weiding
- Production locations: BBC Television Centre, London
- Running time: 75 minutes

Original release
- Network: BBC1
- Release: 31 December 1969
- Network: ZDF
- Release: 18 January 1970

Pop Go The Sixties! (also known as Pop Go The 60s!) was a one-off, 75-minute TV special originally broadcast in colour on 31 December 1969, to celebrate the major pop hits of the 1960s. (It is not to be confused with the 2007 BBC series of the same name and on the same subject.) The show was a co-production between the United Kingdom's BBC and West Germany's ZDF broadcasters. The latter showed it on 18 January 1970 under the title "Schlag auf Schlagers". Although a co-production, it was primarily produced by the BBC and recorded at the BBC's Television Centre in London, in late 1969, featuring largely only British pop acts and hits.

== History ==
The show (which went out at 10:35pm) was presented by Jimmy Savile and Elfi von Kalckreuth. was a one-off, 75-minute TV special originally broadcast in colour on 31 December 1969, The two presenters introduced each act (with the exception of Cliff Richard), but neither was present in the studio recording with the artists, their links being added later. Elfi von Kalckreuth spoke in German throughout the show.

The BBC's Johnnie Stewart produced the show, while Stanley Dorfman directed. Both men were involved with the regular production of BBC music show Top of the Pops and this show had a very similar look and production style. The artists performed on rostra, surrounded by a standing audience who danced along with the music. Klaus Weiding was the co-producer for the German station. The end titles are in both English and German.

Some of the artists present in the studio performed live, singing with an orchestra directed by Johnny Harris but many mimed to their original studio recordings. The Ascot Dancers appeared with a large number of the performers. Although a British-West German co-production, only one West German artist appears and that is on a pre-recorded film insert. The only song performed in German is by Sandie Shaw, who performed incomplete versions of two songs.

The participating artists were (in order of appearance):

- The Who – I Can See for Miles
- Adam Faith – What Do You Want? & Someone Else's Baby
- The Tremeloes – Silence Is Golden
- Lulu – Boom Bang-a-Bang
- Kenny Ball & His Jazzmen – Midnight in Moscow
- The Bachelors – Charmaine & Diane
- Sandie Shaw – (There's) Always Something There to Remind Me & Wiedehopf im Mai (German-language version of Puppet on a String)
- Marmalade – Ob-La-Di, Ob-La-Da
- The Johnny Harris Orchestra & The Ascot Dancers – (I Can't Get No) Satisfaction
- The Kinks – Days
- Horst Jankowski – A Walk in the Black Forest
- The Hollies – He Ain't Heavy, He's My Brother
- Helen Shapiro – Walkin' Back to Happiness
- Tom Jones – Delilah
- The Rolling Stones – Gimme Shelter
- Cilla Black – Anyone Who Had a Heart
- The Shadows – Apache
- Cliff Richard & The Shadows – Bachelor Boy
- Cliff Richard – Congratulations
- The Beatles – I Feel Fine & Help!

Audio of The Beatles track Twist and Shout was played over the closing credits.

Adam Faith's song What Do You Want? had reached number 1 in the UK Singles Chart in 1959, but was the first number 2 record of the 1960s.

The Bee Gees, The Dave Clark Five and Engelbert Humperdinck were all invited to appear in the show, but eventually none of them were available or included in the recording. Dusty Springfield dropped out from the final running order just before the recording due to illness, after rehearsing her song You Don't Have to Say You Love Me. An introduction was recorded by the hosts and she is listed on the show's credits. This has led to later speculation that her contribution was wiped, but it was never recorded. Cilla Black had earlier had to cancel pre-recording due to illness and was eventually represented with an existing (colour) TV clip taken from her own TV series shown in November 1969. Tom Jones also had to withdraw from the recording at short notice, resulting in the inclusion of a 29 February 1968 performance of his song from Top of the Pops. This footage was a film recording in monochrome and was shown on a giant screen in the studio, with the audience dancing to the soundtrack. Horst Jankowski appears in a film insert shot in a snowy landscape in West Germany. The Rolling Stones were not present for the recording either. Their performance was recorded (in colour) in another studio without an audience and cut into the final edit.

The Rolling Stones song Gimme Shelter was the only track included in the show that had not been a hit single but instead an extremely popular album track. The Beatles performances were also archive clips, taken from the 1966 documentary film The Beatles at Shea Stadium. Although presented back-to-back, Sandie Shaw undergoes a costume change between her two performances. Most of the full programme recording has survived in the archives, together with out-takes and a re-recording of The Shadows performances. The show has been repeated on both BBC Four and The Yesterday channel in the UK and often on other European stations. Due to rights issues, the repeats have often been forced to omit The Beatles footage.

In 2015, the most recent repeat on BBC Four was edited to remove all appearances of Savile due to the sexual abuse revelations about him and subsequent Operation Yewtree investigation. Each song originally introduced by Savile (shown in a completely random order compared with the original production) was introduced by an on screen caption. Elfi von Kalckreuth still appeared in the edit.
