= Charles Turner (musician) =

American trumpeter (1936–2006)

- Born: May 26, 1936
- Died: May 19, 2006 (aged 69)
- Education: Florida State University
- Occupation: Jazz trumpeter

Charles Henry Turner (May 26, 1936 – May 19, 2006) was an American jazz trumpeter. Turner performed with Frank Sinatra for eight years, as well as Ella Fitzgerald, Jimmy Dorsey, Ralph Flanagan, Harry James, Charlie Spivak, Count Basie and many other great musicians of the 20th century. In a career spanning over thirty years, he played lead trumpet for jazz bands, Las Vegas show bands, and Los Angeles studio Orchestras.

== Biography ==
Charles Henry Turner was born to Charles Rodgers Turner and Norma (Durrance) Turner in 1936. Growing up in rural Bunnell, Florida as an only child, Charlie showed exceptional talent at an early age. After picking up the trumpet at 10 years of age he progressed rapidly as he played in junior high and high school bands. During his Bunnell High School years he also began to visit Florida State University, and played in FSU's Summer Band Camp Program until he graduated from Bunnell High in 1953.

Charles officially enrolled in Florida State University in 1954. Charlie was an outstanding performer in the FSU College of Music, taking lead roles in the Symphonic Band, Marching Chiefs, Symphonic Orchestra, Circus Band and a variety of other FSU music ensembles such as the Commodores. He attended FSU from 1954-1959. Toward the end of his years at FSU, Charlie began to pick up jobs playing with outside orchestras, and it wasn't long before Charlie had left FSU and was playing with the show bands of Las Vegas.

Charlie's horn was soon leading such stellar bands as Ralph Flanagan, Charlie Spivak, Jimmy Dorsey, Harry James, and Count Basie. He also played with the Chicago Symphony Orchestra.

== Years with Frank Sinatra ==
In 1975 Frank Sinatra heard Charlie play and asked him to play lead trumpet for his band. Charlie went on to play for Sinatra from 1975 to 1983. He not only played in Sinatra's big band but also in his smaller tour band consisting of drums, bass, piano, sax and trumpet. This core group traveled with Sinatra all over the world on European, Middle Eastern, North African and South American tours. During this time in his career, Charlie played for presidential inaugurations, the Queen of the United Kingdom and many performances at Carnegie Hall.

Sinatra respected Charlie's talent enormously and featured him on solo performances. Not only did Charlie play for royalty, presidents and dignitaries but also played and sometimes recorded for entertainers such as Ava Gardner, Ingrid Bergman, Sammy Davis Jr., Dean Martin, Wayne Newton, Andy Williams, Milton Berle, Ella Fitzgerald, Debbie Reynolds, Robert Goulet, Red Skelton, Jerry Lewis, Don Rickles, John Denver, Vic Damone, Steve Lawrence and Eydie Gorme.

Around 1984, as Frank Sinatra continued to tour the world at a frantic pace, Charlie decided he wanted to record his own album featuring songs out of the Sinatra song book that featured his trumpet. He asked Sinatra for permission to record his songs, to which Sinatra replied ‘I’ll do better than that. I’ll direct the orchestra.’ The album was titled What’s New and featured music arranged by Sinatra's own great arrangers Billy May, Nelson Riddle and Don Costa. Even though the album was not a commercial success it was widely acclaimed by critics and jazz lovers.

== Turner's interests ==
Charlie Turner had a wide range of interests and hobbies besides music. These included flying (he owned a Piper Cub and often flew with John Denver), photography, tennis, raising great schnauzer show dogs (he named one of his dogs Ava Gardner after his friend), and cooking (he competed with his neighbor Wayne Newton who was thought to bake the best bread). Additionally he was thought to be a prolific reader, a great pool player, and an expert marksman (but refused to hunt animals).

== End of life ==
Toward the end of his life Charlie moved back to Bunnell, Florida, and suffered from diabetes and depression. In the 1990s he began working on a book of his memoirs and recollections of his years in music but never quite finished that project.

Charlie Turner died May 19, 2006, just a week shy of his 70th birthday. His mother, Norma Turner, generously donated many of his scores and arrangements to the FSU College of Music, as well as memorabilia and one of his instruments. A collection of his scores and memorabilia is held at the Warren D. Allen Music Library at Florida State University.

== Discography ==
- What's New: Charles Turner, trumpet: conducted by Frank Sinatra: arranged by Billy May, Nelson Riddle, and Don Costa. Las Vegas, Nevada: Chas Records, 1983.
- Dream Dancing (Ella Fitzgerald, Pablo,1978)
- Sinatra: Vegas (1978 re-issued Reprise 2006).
