= Volunteer Jam: The Movie =

DVD by musician Charlie Daniels

Volunteer Jam: The Movie is a DVD by American musician Charlie Daniels. Daniels has a series of concerts and albums titled Volunteer Jam. It is a concert film from the second Volunteer Jam and is called 'The First Full-Length Southern Rock Motion Picture'. It was shot in 1975. It was released on DVD on September 4, 2007.

== DVD ==
Scene Index

1. Intro (3:05)
2. Whiskey (6:46)
3. Birmingham Blues (5:58)
4. Long Haired Country Boy (5:27)
5. No Place To Go (19:44)
6. Funky Junky (5:10)
7. Texas (3:10)
8. The South's Gonna Do It (Again) (4:28)
9. Orange Blossom Special (6:14)
10. Twenty-Four Hours (10:10)
11. The Thrill Is Gone (11:22)
12. Jelly, Jelly Blues (11:13)
13. Sweet Mama (4:15)
14. Mountain Dew (5:56)
