= Ultimate Christmas (Frank Sinatra album) =

Compilation album by Frank Sinatra
- Released: October 7, 2017
- Genre: Christmas music
- Length: 60:43
- Labels: Capitol; Universal

Frank Sinatra chronology
Sinatra: World On a String (2016)	Ultimate Christmas (2017)	Baby Blue Eyes... May the First Voice You Hear Be Mine (2018)

Ultimate Christmas is a Christmas-themed compilation album by the American singer Frank Sinatra, released on October 6, 2017, by Capitol Records and Universal Music.

== Content ==
Ultimate Christmas features 20 Christmas recordings by Sinatra, most of them being cover versions such as "White Christmas", "Jingle Bells" and "Have Yourself a Merry Little Christmas".

== Release and promotion ==
It was announced on September 24, 2017, and was released on October 7 that same year. On August 20, 2024, the 2LP vinyl of the album was reissued. In 2025, the compilation became Sinatra's 33rd album to enter the top ten on a Billboard chart.

== Track listing ==
No.	Title	Length
1.	"White Christmas"	2:38
2.	"The Christmas Waltz"	3:01
3.	"It Came Upon a Midnight Clear"	2:52
4.	"Jingle Bells"	2:02
5.	"The First Noel"	2:44
6.	"Mistletoe and Holly"	2:19
7.	"The Christmas Song (Merry Christmas to You)"	3:30
8.	"I'll Be Home for Christmas (If Only in My Dreams)"	3:13
9.	"Santa Claus is Comin' to Town"	2:15
10.	"Have Yourself a Merry Little Christmas"	3:58
11.	"An Old Fashioned Christmas"	3:48
12.	"I Heard the Bells on Christmas Day"	2:37
13.	"The Little Drummer Boy"	3:06
14.	"Whatever Happened to Christmas?"	3:06
15.	"The Twelve Days of Christmas"	4:32
16.	"The Bells of Christmas (Greensleeves)"	3:41
17.	"I Wouldn't Trade Christmas"	2:53
18.	"A Baby Just Like You"	2:47
19.	"Christmas Memories"	2:09
20.	"Silent Night"	3:32

== Charts ==
Chart performance for Ultimate Christmas
Chart (2017–2026)	Peak position
Belgian Albums (Ultratop Flanders)	186
Canadian Albums (Billboard)	8
Dutch Albums (Album Top 100)	105
German Albums (Offizielle Top 100)	74
Italian Albums (FIMI)	78
Swiss Albums (Schweizer Hitparade)	67
Swedish Albums (Sverigetopplistan)	55
UK Albums (Official Charts)	33
US Billboard 200	9
US Top Catalog Albums (Billboard)	4
US Top Holiday Albums (Billboard)	5
US Top Jazz Albums (Billboard)	1
