= Ultimate Sinatra =

Ultimate Sinatra (100 Songs Celebrating 100 Years)

Box set and compilation album by Frank Sinatra
- Released: April 21, 2015
- Recorded: 1939–1979
- Genre: Traditional pop
- Length: 317:43
- Label: Capitol

Frank Sinatra chronology
Sinatra: London (2014)	Ultimate Sinatra (100 Songs Celebrating 100 Years) (2015)	Sinatra: World On a String (2016)

Professional ratings
Review scores
Source	Rating
AllMusic	4/5 stars
All About Jazz	4.5/5 stars

Ultimate Sinatra is a 2015 compilation album by American singer Frank Sinatra released specifically to commemorate the 100-year anniversary of his birth. The collection consists of songs recorded from 1939 to 1979 during his sessions for Columbia Records, Capitol Records, and Reprise Records. The 4-CD set consists of 100 songs, plus a never before released bonus track of a rehearsal recording of "The Surrey with the Fringe on Top" from the musical Oklahoma! This edition also features an 80-page booklet with a new essay by Sinatra historian and author Charles Pignone, as well as rare photos and quotes from Sinatra, his family members and key collaborators.

A single-disc version also was released, consisting of 24 tracks from the box set plus an exclusive alternate studio take of "Just In Time." The Australian 2-CD edition adds a complete, previously unreleased recording of Sinatra's December 1961 concert at Sydney Stadium. The American release truncates the Sydney show.

== Track listing ==
Box set edition

=== Disc one ===
1. "All or Nothing at All" (Jack Lawrence, Arthur Altman) – 2:58
2. "I'll Never Smile Again" (Ruth Lowe) – 3:10
3. "Street of Dreams" (Victor Young, Sam M. Lewis) – 2:41
4. "You'll Never Know" (Mack Gordon, Harry Warren) – 3:01
5. "If You Are But a Dream" (Moe Jaffe, Jack Fulton, Nat Bonx) – 3:01
6. "Saturday Night (Is the Loneliest Night of the Week)" (Jule Styne, Sammy Cahn) – 3:04
7. "Nancy (With the Laughing Face)" (Phil Silvers, Jimmy Van Heusen) – 3:13
8. "Oh, What It Seemed to Be" (Bennie Benjamin, George Weiss, Frankie Carle) – 2:59
9. "Five Minutes More" (Styne, Cahn)—arr. by Stordahl – 2:35
10. "Time After Time" (Styne, Cahn) – 3:08
11. "Night and Day" (Cole Porter) – 3:39
12. "The Song Is You" (Oscar Hammerstein II, Jerome Kern) – 3:21
13. "I'm a Fool to Want You" (Jack Wolf, Joel Herron, Frank Sinatra) – 2:55
14. "The Birth of the Blues" (Buddy G. DeSylva, Lew Brown, Ray Henderson) – 3:28
15. "Why Try to Change Me Now?" (Cy Coleman, Joseph A. McCarthy) – 2:50
16. "I've Got the World on a String" (Harold Arlen, Ted Koehler) – 2:11
17. "Don't Worry 'Bout Me" (Rube Bloom, Koehler) – 3:08
18. "My Funny Valentine" (Richard Rodgers, Lorenz Hart) – 2:31
19. "They Can't Take That Away from Me" (George Gershwin, Ira Gershwin) – 1:58
20. "I Get a Kick Out of You" (Porter) – 2:55
21. "Young at Heart" (Carolyn Leigh, Johnny Richards) – 2:52
22. "Last Night When We Were Young" (Arlen, Yip Harburg) – 3:17
23. "Three Coins in the Fountain" (Styne, Cahn) – 3:07
24. "Just One of Those Things" (Porter) – 3:14
25. "All of Me" (Seymour Simons, Gerald Marks) – 2:08
26. "Someone to Watch Over Me" (G. Gershwin, I. Gershwin) – 2:57
27. "I Get Along Without You Very Well (Except Sometimes)" (Hoagy Carmichael, Jane Brown Thompson) – 3:42

=== Disc two ===
1. "This Love of Mine" (Barry Parker, Hank Sanicola, Sinatra) – 3:33
2. "In the Wee Small Hours of the Morning" (David Mann, Bob Hilliard) – 3:00
3. "Learnin' the Blues" (Dolores Vicki Silvers) – 3:04
4. "Love and Marriage" (Cahn, Van Heusen) – 2:37
5. "(Love Is) The Tender Trap" (Cahn, Van Heusen) – 2:58
6. "Love Is Here to Stay" (G. Gershwin, I. Gershwin) – 2:42
7. "You Make Me Feel So Young" (Mack Gordon, Josef Myrow) – 2:57
8. "Memories of You" (Eubie Blake, Andy Razaf) – 2:53
9. "I've Got You Under My Skin" (Porter) – 3:43
10. "Too Marvelous for Words" (Johnny Mercer, Richard A. Whiting) – 2:29
11. "(How Little It Matters) How Little We Know" (Leigh, Philip Springer) – 2:40
12. "I Couldn't Sleep a Wink Last Night" (Harold Adamson, Jimmy McHugh) – 3:25
13. "I Wish I Were in Love Again" (Rodgers, Hart) – 2:27
14. "The Lady Is a Tramp" (Rodgers, Hart) – 3:14
15. "From This Moment On" (Porter) – 3:50
16. "Laura" (Mercer, David Raksin) – 3:28
17. "Where Are You?" (Adamson, McHugh) – 3:30
18. "Witchcraft" (Coleman, Leigh) – 2:53
19. "Bewitched, Bothered and Bewildered" (Rodgers, Hart) – 3:39
20. "All the Way" (Cahn, Van Heusen) – 2:52
21. "Moonlight in Vermont" (John Blackburn, Karl Suessdorf) – 3:32
22. "Come Fly with Me" (Cahn, Van Heusen) – 3:16
23. "Put Your Dreams Away (For Another Day)" (Lowe, Paul Mann, Stephan Weiss) – 3:13
24. "Angel Eyes" (Earl Brent, Matt Dennis) – 3:43
25. "Guess I'll Hang My Tears Out to Dry" (Cahn, Styne) – 4:00

=== Disc three ===
1. "Only the Lonely" (Cahn, Van Heusen) – 4:10
2. "One for My Baby (and One More for the Road)" (Arlen, Mercer) – 4:23
3. "Something's Gotta Give" (Mercer) – 2:38
4. "Come Dance with Me" (Cahn, Van Heusen) – 2:31
5. "Here's That Rainy Day" (Johnny Burke, Van Heusen) – 3:34
6. "A Cottage for Sale" (Larry Conley, Willard Robison) – 3:16
7. "High Hopes" (Cahn, Van Heusen) – 2:42
8. "The Nearness of You" (Carmichael, Ned Washington) – 2:43
9. "I've Got a Crush on You" (G. Gershwin, I. Gershwin) – 2:14
10. "Nice 'n' Easy" (Alan and Marilyn Bergman/Lew Spence) – 2:45
11. "(Ah, the Apple Trees) When the World Was Young" (Mercer, M. Philippe-Gerard, Angele Marie T. Vannier) – 3:48
12. "In the Still of the Night" (Porter) – 3:25
13. "The Second Time Around" (Cahn, Van Heusen) – 3:03
14. "Without a Song" (Billy Rose, Vincent Youmans, Edward Eliscu) – 3:39
15. "Love Walked In" (G. Gershwin, I. Gershwin) – 2:19
16. "Stardust" (Carmichael, Mitchell Parish) – 2:48
17. "Come Rain or Come Shine" (Arlen, Mercer) – 4:05
18. "The Girl Next Door" (Hugh Martin/Ralph Blane) – 3:18
19. "At Long Last Love" (Porter) – 2:14
20. "The Very Thought of You" (Ray Noble) – 3:34
21. "Pennies from Heaven" (Burke, Arthur Johnston) – 2:43
22. "Ol' Man River" (Kern, Hammerstein II) – 4:11
23. "I Have Dreamed" (Rodgers, Hammerstein II) – 3:01
24. "Luck Be a Lady" (Frank Loesser) – 5:14

=== Disc four ===
1. "The Way You Look Tonight" (Kern, Dorothy Fields) – 3:24
2. "My Kind of Town" (Cahn, Van Heusen) – 3:10
3. "The Best is Yet to Come" (Coleman, Leigh) – 2:56
4. "Fly Me to the Moon (In Other Words)" (Bart Howard) – 2:29
5. "Softly, as I Leave You" (Hal Shaper, Antonio DeVita, Giorgio Calabrese) – 2:52
6. "It Was a Very Good Year" (Ervin Drake) – 4:25
7. "The September of My Years" (Cahn, Van Heusen) – 3:12
8. "Moonlight Serenade" (Glenn Miller, Parish) – 3:26
9. "Strangers in the Night" (Bert Kaempfert, Charles Singleton, Eddie Snyder) – 2:36
10. "Summer Wind" (Heinz Meier, Hans Bradtke, Mercer) – 2:53
11. "That's Life" (Kelly Gordon, Dean Thompson) – 3:07
12. "I Concentrate on You" (duet with Antônio Carlos Jobim) (Porter) – 2:32
13. "The Girl from Ipanema" (duet with Jobim) (Jobim, Norman Gimbel, Vinícius de Moraes) – 3:14
14. "Drinking Again" (Mercer, Doris Tauber) – 3:13
15. "Somethin' Stupid (duet with Nancy Sinatra)" (Carson Parks) – 2:45
16. "The World We Knew (Over and Over)" (Kaempfert, Carl Sigman, Herb Rehbein) – 2:25
17. "Cycles" (Judith Caldwell) – 3:13
18. "My Way" (Paul Anka, Jacques Revaux, Giles Thibault, Claude François) – 4:35
19. "Wave" (Jobim) – 3:25
20. "All My Tomorrows" (Cahn, Van Heusen) – 4:35
21. "Forget to Remember" (Victoria Pike, Teddy Randazzo) – 2:58
22. "It Had to Be You" (Isham Jones, Gus Kahn) – 3:53
23. "All of You" (Porter) – 1:42
24. "Theme from New York, New York" (John Kander, Fred Ebb) – 3:26
25. "The Surrey with the Fringe on Top" (from Oklahoma!) (Rodgers, Hammerstein II) (Rehearsal) (previously unreleased) – 2:37

=== Double vinyl edition ===
Side A

1. "All Or Nothing At All"
2. "I’ll Never Smile Again"
3. "Saturday Night (Is The Loneliest Night Of The Week)"
4. "Nancy (With The Laughing Face)"
5. "I’ve Got The World On A String"
6. "Young At Heart"
7. "In The Wee Small Hours Of The Morning"

Side B

1. "Learnin’ The Blues"
2. "Love And Marriage"
3. "I’ve Got You Under My Skin"
4. "Witchcraft"
5. "All The Way"

Side C

1. "Come Fly With Me"
2. "One For My Baby (And One More For The Road)"
3. "The Way You Look Tonight"
4. "My Kind Of Town"
5. "Fly Me To The Moon (In Other Words)"
6. "It Was A Very Good Year"

Side D

1. "Strangers In The Night"
2. "Summer Wind"
3. "That’s Life"
4. "My Way"
5. "Theme From New York, New York"
6. "Put Your Dreams Away (For Another Day)"

=== Single CD / digital edition ===
1. "All or Nothing at All" – 2:58
2. "I'll Never Smile Again" – 3:10
3. "Saturday Night (Is the Loneliest Night of the Week)" – 2:44
4. "Nancy (With the Laughing Face)" – 3:13
5. "I've Got the World on a String" – 2:10
6. "Young at Heart" – 2:49
7. "In the Wee Small Hours of the Morning" – 2:59
8. "Learnin' the Blues" – 3:01
9. "Love and Marriage" – 2:38
10. "I've Got You Under My Skin" – 3:42
11. "Witchcraft" – 2:52
12. "All the Way" – 2:52
13. "Come Fly with Me" – 3:18
14. "One for My Baby (and One More for the Road)" – 4:24
15. "The Way You Look Tonight" – 3:21
16. "My Kind of Town" – 3:09
17. "Fly Me to the Moon" – 2:27
18. "It Was a Very Good Year" – 4:26
19. "Strangers in the Night" – 2:36
20. "Summer Wind" – 2:55
21. "That's Life" – 3:06
22. "My Way" – 4:35
23. "Theme from New York, New York" – 3:24
24. "Put Your Dreams Away" – 3:11
25. "Just in Time" (Alternate version, bonus track)
26. "Chicago (That Toddlin' Town)" (Digital-only bonus track) (Fred Fisher)

== Chart performance ==
The 4-disc box set entitled Ultimate Sinatra: The Centennial Collection peaked at no. 2 on the Billboard Jazz Album Chart and no. 145 on the Billboard 200. The single disc album peaked at no. 1 on the Billboard Jazz Album chart and at no. 32 on the Billboard 200.

=== Weekly charts ===
Weekly chart performance
Chart (2015–2026)	Peak position
Austrian Albums (Ö3 Austria)	44
Belgian Albums (Ultratop Flanders)	72
Belgian Albums (Ultratop Wallonia)	122
Canadian Albums (Billboard)	77
Croatian International Albums (HDU)	34
Dutch Albums (Album Top 100)	111
German Albums (Offizielle Top 100)	85
Greece Albums (Billboard)	5
Scottish Albums (Official Charts)	59
Spanish Albums (Promusicae)	38
Swiss Albums (Schweizer Hitparade)	35
UK Albums (Official Charts)	58
US Billboard 200	32

=== Year-end charts ===
Chart (2020)	Position
US Billboard 200	144

== Certifications ==
Region	Certification	Certified units/sales
Germany (BVMI)	5× Gold	50,000^{‡}
United Kingdom (BPI)	Platinum	300,000^{‡}
^{‡} Sales+streaming figures based on certification alone.
