= Sinatra: New York =

Live album by Frank Sinatra
- Released: November 3, 2009
- Recorded: 1955–1990
- Genres: Vocal jazz; traditional pop
- Length: 208:06
- Label: Reprise

Frank Sinatra chronology
Christmas with Sinatra & Friends (2009)	Sinatra: New York (2009)	36 Greatest Hits! (2010)

Professional ratings
Review scores
Source	Rating
AllMusic	2.5/5 stars
Pitchfork Media	(6.1/10.0)

Sinatra: New York is a 2009 box set album of live performances by the American singer Frank Sinatra, recorded in New York City, both at the Carnegie Hall, and at Madison Square Garden.

The first disc captures two live performances from 1955 and 1963, disc two and three are from the Carnegie Hall and from Madison Square Garden in 1974. The final two discs are from the 1980s, with disc five a previously unreleased DVD of a June 25, 1980, performance at the Carnegie Hall.

== Track listing ==
=== Disc One (Recorded at the Manhattan Center, February 3, 1955 and at the United Nations, September 13, 1963) ===
Manhattan Center, February 3, 1955, with Tommy Dorsey

1. Introductions: Martin Block and Tommy Dorsey – 3:51
2. "I'll Never Smile Again" (Ruth Lowe) – 3:28
3. "Oh! Look at Me Now" (Joe Bushkin, John DeVries) – 2:07
4. "This Love of Mine" (Sol Parker, Hank Sanicola, Frank Sinatra) – 4:40

United Nations, September 13, 1963, with Skitch Henderson (piano)

1. "Too Marvelous for Words" (Johnny Mercer, Richard A. Whiting) – 2:34
2. "They Can't Take That Away from Me" (George Gershwin, Ira Gershwin) – 2:40
3. "I Have Dreamed" (Oscar Hammerstein II, Richard Rodgers) – 3:16
4. Monologue by Frank Sinatra – 2:12
5. "A Foggy Day" (G. Gershwin, I. Gershwin) – 3:15
6. "My Heart Stood Still" (Lorenz Hart, Rodgers) – 2:57
7. "I Get a Kick Out of You" (Cole Porter) – 3:47

=== Disc Two (Recorded at the Carnegie Hall, April 8, 1974) ===
- Orchestra Conducted by Bill Miller

For Mr. Sinatra:

Piano: Bill Miller * Guitar: Al Viola *

Bass: Gene Cherico * Drums: Irv Cottler

1. Overture: "All the Way"/"My Kind of Town"/"You Will Be My Music" (Sammy Cahn, Jimmy Van Heusen)/(Cahn, Van Heusen)/(Joe Raposo) – 2:37
2. "Come Fly with Me" (Cahn, Van Heusen) – 2:06
3. "I Get a Kick Out of You" – 4:15
4. "Don't Worry 'bout Me" (Rube Bloom, Ted Koehler) – 4:34
5. "If" (David Gates) – 4:03
6. "Bad, Bad Leroy Brown" (Jim Croce) – 3:01
7. Saloon Trilogy: "Last Night When We Were Young"/"Violets for Your Furs"/"Here's That Rainy Day" (Harold Arlen, Yip Harburg)/(Matt Dennis, Tom Adair)/(Van Heusen, Burke) – 11:05
8. Bows: "You Will Be My Music" – 1:01
9. Monologue by Frank Sinatra – 7:20
10. "My Way" (Paul Anka, Claude François, Gilles Thibaut, Jacques Revaux) – 4:24
11. "You Will Be My Music" – 4:09
12. "I've Got You Under My Skin" (Porter) – 4:35
13. "Send in the Clowns" (Stephen Sondheim) – 5:10
14. "That's Life" (Kelly Gordon, Dean Kay) – 2:38
15. Bows: "My Way" – 1:11
16. "There Used to Be a Ballpark" (Raposo) – 4:04
17. "My Kind of Town" – 3:13
18. Bows: "My Way" – 1:54

=== Disc Three (Recorded at Madison Square Garden, October 12, 1974) ===
- Orchestra Conducted by Bill Miller

Featuring Woody Herman and the Younger Thundering Herd

For Mr. Sinatra:

Piano: Bill Miller * Guitar: Al Viola *

Bass: Gene Cherico * Drums: Irv Cottler

1. Overture: "It Was a Very Good Year"/"All the Way"/"My Kind of Town" (Ervin Drake)/(Cahn, Van Heusen)/(Cahn, Van Heusen) – 2:58
2. "The Lady Is a Tramp" (Hart, Rodgers) – 4:07
3. "I Get a Kick Out of You" – 4:13
4. "What Are You Doing the Rest of Your Life?" (Alan Bergman, Marilyn Bergman, Michel Legrand) – 4:21
5. "Bad, Bad Leroy Brown" – 3:19
6. "Let Me Try Again (Laisse Moi le Temps)" (Anka, Cahn, Michel Jourdon) – 4:51
7. "Send in the Clowns" – 5:34
8. "My Kind of Town" – 2:48
9. Monologue by Frank Sinatra – 3:16
10. "Autumn in New York" (Vernon Duke) – 3:30
11. "If" – 3:30
12. "I've Got You Under My Skin" – 4:38
13. "Angel Eyes" (Earl Brent, Dennis) – 6:11
14. "The House I Live In (That's America to Me)" (Lewis Allan, Earl Robinson) – 6:15
15. "You Are the Sunshine of My Life" (Stevie Wonder) – 4:15
16. "My Way" – 4:00
17. Bows: "My Way" – 1:57
- See also: "The Main Event – Live".

=== Disc Four (Recorded at the Carnegie Hall, June 1984 and at Radio City Music Hall, June 1990) ===
- Carnegie Hall, June 1984

Orchestra Conducted by Joe Parnello

For Mr. Sinatra:

Piano: Joe Parnello * Guitar: Tony Mottola * Drums: Irv Cottler

1. "Fly Me to the Moon (In Other Words)" (Bart Howard) – 2:35
2. "Luck Be a Lady" (Frank Loesser) – 6:10
3. "This Is All I Ask" (Gordon Jenkins) – 3:49
4. "Come Rain or Come Shine" (Arlen, Mercer) – 3:49
5. Monologue by Frank Sinatra – 1:54
6. "My Way" – 3:34
7. "Teach Me Tonight" (Cahn, Gene de Paul) – 4:31
8. "Pennies from Heaven" (Burke, Arthur Johnston) – 4:12
- Radio City Music Hall, June 1990

Orchestra Conducted by Frank Sinatra Jr.

For Mr. Sinatra:

Piano: Bill Miller * Guitar: Ron Anthony *

Bass: Jim Hughart * Drums: Sol Gubin

1. "For Once in My Life" (Ron Miller, Orlando Murden) – 3:00
2. "Strangers in the Night" (Bert Kaempfert, Charles Singleton, Eddie Snyder) – 2:39
3. Monologue by Frank Sinatra – 4:04
4. "Mack the Knife" (Marc Blitzstein, Bertolt Brecht, Kurt Weill) – 4:49
5. "Summer Wind" (Hans Bradtke, Heinz Meier, Mercer) – 3:09
6. "Theme from New York, New York" (Fred Ebb, John Kander) – 3:39
7. Bows: "Goodbye" (Jenkins) – 2:01

=== Disc Five (DVD) (Recorded at the Carnegie Hall, June 25, 1980) ===
- Orchestra Conducted by Vincent Falcone Jr.

For Mr. Sinatra:

Piano: Bernie Leighton * Guitar: Tony Mottola *

Bass: Gene Cherico * Drums: Irv Cottler * Trumpet: Charles Turner

1. "I've Got the World on a String" (Arlen, Koehler)
2. "The Best Is Yet to Come" (Cy Coleman, Carolyn Leigh)
3. "The Lady Is a Tramp"
4. "When Your Lover Has Gone" (Einar Aaron Swan)
5. "This Is All I Ask"
6. "I've Got You Under My Skin"
7. "Summer Me, Winter Me" (A. Bergman, M. Bergman, Legrand)
8. "Street of Dreams" (Sam M. Lewis, Victor Young)
9. Medley: "The Gal That Got Away"/"It Never Entered My Mind" (Arlen, I. Gershwin)/(Rodgers, Hart)
10. "I Can't Get Started" (Duke, I. Gershwin)
11. "Send in the Clowns"
12. "Come Fly with Me"
13. "Guess I'll Hang My Tears Out to Dry" (Cahn, Jule Styne)
14. "You and Me (We Wanted It All)" (Peter Allen, Carole Bayer Sager)
15. "The Song Is You" (Hammerstein, Jerome Kern)
16. "Theme from New York, New York"

== Personnel ==
- Frank Sinatra – vocals
- Bill Miller – piano, conductor
- Joe Parnello – piano, conductor
- Frank Sinatra Jr. – conductor
- Vincent Falcone Jr. – conductor
- Bernie Leighton – piano
- Skitch Henderson – piano
- Al Viola – guitar
- Tony Mottola – guitar
- Ron Anthony – guitar
- Irv Cottler – drums
- Sol Gubin – drums
- Gene Cherico – bass
- Jim Hughart – bass
- Charles Turner – trumpet
- Woody Herman and his orchestra
