= The Carpenters: In Concert =

- Directed by: Stanley Dorfman
- Starring: The Carpenters, Karen Carpenter, Richard Carpenter, Tony Joe White
- Original language: English

Production
- Producer: Stanley Dorfman

Original release
- Network: BBC Two
- Release: 1971

The Carpenters In Concert is the first episode of Series 4 of the BBC's In Concert music television series, directed and produced by Stanley Dorfman.

== Overview ==
It was The Carpenters début BBC concert that was filmed live in BBC Studios and first broadcast on BBC Two on 6 November 1971. The BBC later repeat-broadcast it under the name The Carpenters at the BBC.

The song "And When He Smiles" from the performance was later included in the studio album As Time Goes By.

== Music Played ==
1. "Help!"
2. "Love Is Surrender"
3. "Superstar"
4. "And When He Smiles"
5. "Rainy Days and Mondays"
6. "That on the Road Look"
7. "I Fell in Love with You"
8. "Bacharach/David Medley"
9. "For All We Know"
10. "Lust for Earl and the Married Woman"
11. "Sometimes"
12. "(They Long to Be) Close to You"
13. "We've Only Just Begun"
