= Bill Miller (pianist) =

- Born: February 3, 1915; Brooklyn, New York, United States
- Died: July 11, 2006 (aged 91) Montreal, Quebec, Canada
- Genres: Jazz
- Occupation: Pianist
- Instrument: Piano
- Years active: 1930s-2006
- Formerly of: Frank Sinatra, Frank Sinatra Jr.

Bill Miller (February 3, 1915 – July 11, 2006) was an American jazz pianist, who accompanied Frank Sinatra for more than 40 years, and for the last eight years of his life, accompanied Frank Sinatra Jr.

== Life and career ==
Miller was born in Brooklyn, New York. Performing with Red Norvo, Mildred Bailey and Charlie Barnet in the 1930s, Miller also performed with Tommy Dorsey and Benny Goodman.

First meeting Sinatra in 1941, they did not work together until November 1951, when Miller was performing in the lounge of the Desert Inn, in Las Vegas. Sinatra was having difficulty holding on to pianists, and it was Jimmy Van Heusen who recommended Miller to Sinatra. Frank called Miller by the nicknames "Sun Tan Charlie" or "Sunshine Charlie".

Miller's house was destroyed in a 1964 mudslide in Burbank, California, which also claimed the life of his wife, Aimee. He was abruptly dismissed for no apparent reason by Sinatra in 1978, but was invited back in 1985.

Sinatra died in 1998, and Miller performed "One for My Baby (and One More for the Road)" at his funeral. He retired for three years, and then came out of retirement to work for Sinatra's son, Frank Sinatra, Jr.

Bill Miller also played on the recreation of Silent Night, re-recorded after Sinatra's death with a full orchestra.

Miller died "on the road", while touring with Sinatra, Jr., from complications following a heart attack, at Montreal General Hospital at age 91.

== Selected discography ==
with Buddy Collette

- Buddy Collette's Swinging Shepherds (EmArcy, 1958)
- At the Cinema! (Mercury, 1959)

with Frank Sinatra

- Songs for Young Lovers (1954)
- In the Wee Small Hours (1955)
- Frank Sinatra Sings for Only the Lonely (1958)
- Sinatra & Sextet: Live in Paris (1962)
- Sinatra at the Sands (1966)
- That's Life (1966)
- Cycles (1968)
- The Main Event – Live (1974)
- Duets (1993)
- Duets II (1994)
- Frank Sinatra with the Red Norvo Quintet: Live in Australia, 1959 (1997)
- Sinatra: Vegas (2006)
- Sinatra: New York (2009)
- Live at the Meadowlands (2009)
- Sinatra: London (2014)
- Ultimate Sinatra (2015)

with Robbie Williams

- Swing When You're Winning (2001)
