= Sinatra: Vegas =

Live album by Frank Sinatra
- Released: November 7, 2006
- Recorded: 1961–1987
- Genres: Vocal jazz; traditional pop
- Length: 272:57
- Label: Reprise

Frank Sinatra chronology
Duets/Duets II: 90th Birthday Limited Collector's Edition (2005)	Sinatra: Vegas (2006)	Romance: Songs From the Heart (2007)

Professional ratings
Review scores
Source	Rating
AllMusic	3.5/5 stars
Pitchfork Media	(8.7/10.0)

Sinatra: Vegas is a 2006 box set of live performances by the American singer Frank Sinatra, recorded in Las Vegas.

This box set covers some twenty years of Sinatra's performances in Las Vegas, both at the Sands Casino, and at Caesars Palace. The first disc captures a live performance from 1961, disc two is from 1966, an alternative performance to that found on Sinatra at the Sands.

The final two discs are from the 1980s, with disc five a previously unreleased DVD of a May 5, 1978 performance at Caesars Palace.

This set peaked at #165 on the Billboard 200.

== Track listing ==
=== Disc one (recorded at the Copa Room at the Sands Hotel and Casino, Las Vegas, Nevada, November 2, 1961) ===
- Featuring Antonio Morelli and His Orchestra

Orchestra conducted by Antonio Morelli

For Mr. Sinatra:

Piano: Bill Miller

1. Introductions and Announcement - 0:26
2. "The One I Love (Belongs to Somebody Else)" (Isham Jones, Gus Kahn) - 2:39
3. "Don't Cry, Joe (Let Her Go, Let Her Go, Let Her Go)" (Joe Marsala) - 2:33
4. "Imagination" (Johnny Burke, Jimmy Van Heusen) - 2:42
5. "Moonlight in Vermont" (John Blackburn, Karl Suessdorf) - 3:07
6. "Without a Song" (Edward Eliscu, Billy Rose, Vincent Youmans) - 2:46
7. "In the Still of the Night" (Cole Porter) - 3:27
8. "Here's That Rainy Day" (Burke, Van Heusen) - 2:38
9. "The Moon Was Yellow (And the Night Was Young)" (Fred E. Ahlert, Edgar Leslie) - 2:34
10. Monologue by Frank Sinatra ("Ring-A-Ding Ding"/Monologue) (Sammy Cahn, Van Heusen)- 2:40
11. "You Make Me Feel So Young" (Mack Gordon, Josef Myrow) - 2:45
12. "The Second Time Around" (Cahn, Van Heusen) - 2:51
13. "River, Stay 'Way from My Door" (Parody) (Mort Dixon, Harry M. Woods) - 3:49
14. "The Lady is a Tramp" (Lorenz Hart, Richard Rodgers) - 3:40
15. "Just One of Those Things" (Porter) - 4:10
16. "You're Nobody till Somebody Loves You" (James Cavanaugh, Russ Morgan, Larry Stock) - 4:08
17. Bows by Frank Sinatra - 0:40
18. "Young at Heart" (Carolyn Leigh, Jimmy Richards) - 2:00
19. "Witchcraft" (Cy Coleman, Leigh) - 1:29
20. "On the Road to Mandalay" (Rudyard Kipling, Oley Speaks) - 2:50
21. "Bows by Frank Sinatra - 0:43
22. Frank Sinatra Speaks on Segregation in Nevada - 1:38

=== Disc two (recorded at the Copa Room at the Sands Hotel and Casino, Las Vegas, Nevada, January 28, 1966) ===
- Featuring Count Basie & The Count Basie Orchestra

Orchestra conducted by Quincy Jones

For Mr. Sinatra:

Piano: Count Basie

1. Introductions - 1:23
2. "Come Fly with Me" (Cahn, Van Heusen) - 3:03
3. "I've Got a Crush on You" (George Gershwin, Ira Gershwin) - 2:59
4. "I've Got You Under My Skin" (Porter) - 3:27
5. "The September of My Years" (Cahn, Van Heusen) - 3:03
6. "Street of Dreams" (Sam M. Lewis, Victor Young) - 2:13
7. "Fly Me to the Moon (In Other Words)" (Bart Howard) - 2:49
8. Monologue by Frank Sinatra - 8:33
9. "You Make Me Feel So Young" - 3:16
10. "The Shadow of Your Smile" (Johnny Mandel, Paul Francis Webster) - 2:40
11. "Get Me to the Church on Time" (Alan Jay Lerner, Frederick Loewe) - 2:26
12. "Luck Be a Lady" (Frank Loesser) - 4:34
13. "It Was a Very Good Year" (Ervin Drake) - 3:51
14. "Don't Worry 'Bout Me" (Rube Bloom, Ted Koehler) - 3:15
15. "My Kind of Town" (Cahn, Van Heusen) - 2:54
16. Introductions by Frank Sinatra - 4:39
17. "My Kind of Town" (Reprise) - 1:44
18. Frank Sinatra Speaks on Working with Count Basie - 1:12

=== Disc three (9pm show recorded at the Circus Maximus Showroom at Caesars Palace, Las Vegas, Nevada, March 13, 1982) ===
- Featuring the Caesars Palace Orchestra

Orchestra conducted by Vincent Falcone Jr.

For Mr. Sinatra

Piano: Vincent Falcone Jr. * Guitar: Tony Mottola * Drums: Irv Cottler

Guest: Nancy Sinatra and Dean Martin

1. "Get Me to the Church on Time" - 2:28
2. "I Get a Kick Out of You" (Porter) - 5:35
3. "I Can't Get Started" (Vernon Duke, I. Gershwin) - 3:05
4. "Without a Song" - 3:48
5. "Hey Look, No Crying" (Susan Birkenhead, Jule Styne) - 3:49
6. "The Lady is a Tramp" - 3:49
7. Monologue by Frank Sinatra - 2:59
8. "Night and Day" (Porter) - 2:32
9. "All or Nothing at All" (Arthur Altman, Jack Lawrence) - 3:21
10. "The One I Love (Belongs to Somebody Else)" - 3:14
11. "These Foolish Things (Remind Me Of You)" (Harry Link, Holt Marvell, Jack Strachey) - 2:25
12. "Somethin' Stupid" (duet with Nancy Sinatra) (Carson Parks) - 6:10
13. "Theme from New York, New York" (Fred Ebb, John Kander) - 4:40
14. Bows by Frank Sinatra - 0:55

=== Disc four (Show 2 recorded at the Golden Nugget Las Vegas, Las Vegas, Nevada, April 5, 1987) ===
Orchestra conducted by Bill Miller

For Mr. Sinatra

Piano: Lou Levy * Drums: Irv Cottler

1. "I've Got the World on a String" (Harold Arlen, Koehler) - 2:39
2. "At Long Last Love" (Porter) - 2:31
3. "Witchcraft" - 2:43
4. Medley: "The Gal That Got Away"/"It Never Entered My Mind" (Arlen, I. Gershwin)/(Rodgers, Hart) - 6:52
5. "For Once in My Life" (Ron Miller, Orlando Murden) - 3:05
6. "My Heart Stood Still" (Rodgers, Hart) - 3:22
7. "You Are the Sunshine of My Life" (Stevie Wonder) - 2:46
8. Monologue by Frank Sinatra - 1:45
9. "Spring is Here" (Rodgers, Hart) - 3:26
10. "What Now My Love?" (Gilbert Bécaud, Pierre Leroyer, Carl Sigman) - 2:37
11. "I Get Along Without You Very Well (Except Sometimes)" (Hoagy Carmichael) - 4:08
12. "Pennies from Heaven" (Johnny Burke, Arthur Johnston) - 3:41
13. "Angel Eyes" (Earl Brent, Matt Dennis) - 7:45
14. "Mack the Knife" (Marc Blitzstein, Bertolt Brecht, Kurt Weill) - 4:22
15. Bows by Frank Sinatra - 1:16

=== Disc five (DVD) (recorded at Caesar's Palace, May 5, 1978) ===
- Featuring Caesar's Palace Orchestra

Orchestra conducted by Bill Miller

For Mr. Sinatra

Piano: Vincent Falcone Jr. and Bill Miller * Guitar: Al Viola *

Bass: Gene Cherico * Drums: Irv Cottler

1. Backstage (Before the Show)
2. Welcome to Caesars
3. "All of Me" (Gerald Marks, Seymour Simons)
4. "Maybe This Time" (Kander, Ebb)
5. "The Lady Is a Tramp"
6. "Didn't We?" (Jimmy Webb)
7. "Someone to Watch Over Me" (G. Gershwin, I. Gershwin)
8. "Something" (George Harrison)
9. "Baubles, Bangles and Beads" (Alexander Borodine, George Forrest, Robert C. Wright)
10. Medley: "The Gal That Got Away"/"It Never Entered My Mind"
11. Monologue
12. "My Kind of Town"
13. "Send in the Clowns" (Stephen Sondheim)
14. Monologue
15. "Don't Worry 'Bout Me"
16. Introductions
17. "My Way" (Paul Anka, Claude François, Jacques Revaux, Gilles Thibault)
18. "America the Beautiful" (Katharine Lee Bates)
19. Backstage (After The Show)
20. "Freedom to Live"
21. "Freedom to Live"

== Personnel ==
- Frank Sinatra – vocals
- Nancy Sinatra
- Bill Miller – arrangements, pianist
- Quincy Jones – arranger, conductor
- Count Basie and His Orchestra
- Antonio Morelli and His Orchestra
- Al Viola – guitar
- Irving Cottler – drums
- Lou Levy – piano
- Gene Cherico – bass
