= The Complete Reprise Studio Recordings =

Box set by Frank Sinatra
- Released: November 21, 1995
- Recorded: December 19, 1960 – June 6, 1988
- Genres: Traditional pop; vocal jazz
- Length: 1436:49
- Label: Reprise

Frank Sinatra chronology
Sinatra 80th: All the Best (1995)	The Complete Reprise Studio Recordings (1995)	Everything Happens to Me (1996)

The Complete Reprise Studio Recordings is a 1995 box set album by the American singer Frank Sinatra. The release coincided with Sinatra's 80th birthday celebration.

The original 1995 packaging had the 20 discs encased in a small, leather-bound trunk. When it was re-released in 1998, it was repackaged in a more-standard (and cheaper) cardboard format.

== Features ==
As the title implies, the set claims to contain every song ever recorded in the studio during Sinatra's career with Reprise Records, but misses the 49-second "I'm Getting Sentimental Over You" (Reprise) included as the closing track from the 1961 album I Remember Tommy and also leaves off a remake of "Body and Soul" and "Leave It All To Me" (a song written by Paul Anka), in addition to several alternate versions of songs included in the set. The set is the largest ever released for Sinatra to-date, containing 452 tracks on twenty compact discs. The albums represented are:

1. Ring-a-Ding-Ding!
2. Swing Along With Me
3. I Remember Tommy
4. Sinatra and Strings
5. Sinatra and Swingin' Brass
6. Sinatra Sings Great Songs from Great Britain
7. All Alone
8. Sinatra-Basie: An Historic Musical First (with Count Basie)
9. The Concert Sinatra
10. Sinatra's Sinatra
11. Finian's Rainbow
12. Guys and Dolls (with Bing Crosby and Dean Martin)
13. Kiss Me, Kate (with Sammy Davis Jr., Dean Martin and Keely Smith)
14. South Pacific (with Rosemary Clooney and Keely Smith)
15. Sinatra Sings Days of Wine and Roses, Moon River, and Other Academy Award Winners
16. America, I Hear You Singing
17. Robin and the 7 Hoods (with Bing Crosby, Sammy Davis Jr. and Dean Martin)
18. It Might as Well Be Swing (with Count Basie)
19. 12 Songs of Christmas (Frank Sinatra, Bing Crosby and Fred Waring album)
20. Softly, as I Leave You
21. Sinatra '65: The Singer Today
22. September of My Years
23. My Kind of Broadway
24. A Man and His Music
25. Moonlight Sinatra
26. Strangers in the Night
27. That's Life
28. Francis Albert Sinatra & Antonio Carlos Jobim (with Antonio Carlos Jobim)
29. The World We Knew
30. Movin' with Nancy
31. Francis A. & Edward K. (with Duke Ellington)
32. The Sinatra Family Wish You a Merry Christmas
33. Cycles
34. My Way
35. A Man Alone
36. Watertown
37. Sinatra & Company
38. Ol' Blue Eyes Is Back
39. Some Nice Things I've Missed
40. I Sing the Songs
41. Portrait of Sinatra – Forty Songs from the Life of a Man
42. Trilogy: Past Present Future
43. She Shot Me Down
44. L.A. Is My Lady

The set also contained tracks that were never released prior, as well as songs new to compact disc, including those originally recorded for the album America, I Hear You Singing.

They are generally presented in order of when they were recorded, although there are exceptions to that rule, including the concept albums September of My Years and the "Future" section of the triple album Trilogy: Past Present Future. Also, the song cycle Watertown (a story told with its songs) is presented out of order.

== Critical reception ==
Professional ratings
Review scores
Source	Rating
AllMusic	4.5/5 stars
MusicHound Jazz	4/5 stars

Robert Hilburn of the Los Angeles Times wrote that this box set allows us to hear Sinatra "at his most relaxed (joyfully redoing signature songs from his Capitol and Columbia years), at his most adventurous (reaching out to new material and new arrangers) and at his most futile (trying, usually in vain, to connect with contemporary pop-rock songs)." Stephen Holden wrote in The New York Times: "What one finds on this chronology is America's greatest popular singer audaciously continuing to expand the psychological boundaries of pop vocal expression." Holden remarked that "dozens of songs that [Sinatra] had popularized in the 1940's" were re-recorded by the older Sinatra in versions compiled in this box set, which "have the feel of bittersweet interior dialogues between the singer's older and younger selves."

== Track listing ==
The 1998 repackaging of the box set.

=== Disc one ===
1. "Ring-A-Ding-Ding" (Jimmy Van Heusen, Sammy Cahn) – 2:44
2. "Let's Fall in Love" (Harold Arlen, Ted Koehler) – 2:11
3. "In the Still of the Night" (Cole Porter) – 3:25
4. "A Foggy Day" (George Gershwin, Ira Gershwin) – 2:17
  Recorded on December 19, 1960
5. "Let's Face the Music and Dance" (Irving Berlin) – 2:58
6. "You'd Be So Easy to Love" (Porter) – 2:24
7. "A Fine Romance" (Jerome Kern, Dorothy Fields) – 2:11
8. "The Coffee Song (They've Got An Awful Lot of Coffee in Brazil)" (Bob Hilliard, Dick Miles) – 2:51
9. "Be Careful, It's My Heart" (Berlin) – 2:04
  Recorded on December 20, 1960
10. "I've Got My Love to Keep Me Warm" (Berlin) – 2:52
11. "Zing! Went the Strings of My Heart" (James F. Hanley) – 2:48
12. "You and the Night and the Music" (Arthur Schwartz, Howard Dietz) – 2:36
13. "When I Take My Sugar to Tea" (Irving Kahal, Sammy Fain, Pierre Norman) – 2:05
14. "The Last Dance" (Van Heusen, Cahn) – 2:46
15. "The Second Time Around" (Van Heusen, Cahn) – 3:03
16. "Tina" (Van Heusen, Cahn) – 2:56
  Recorded on December 21, 1960
17. "In the Blue of Evening" (Tom Montgomery, Tom Adair, Al D'Artega) – 4:03
  Recorded on March 21, 1961
18. "I'll Be Seeing You" (Fain, Kahal) – 2:49
19. "I'm Getting Sentimental Over You" (George Bassman, Ned Washington) – 3:42
20. "Imagination" (Johnny Burke, Van Heusen) – 3:05
21. "Take Me" (Rube Bloom, David) – 2:19
  Recorded on May 1, 1961
22. "Without a Song" (Vincent Youmans, Billy Rose, Edward Eliscu) – 3:39
23. "Polka Dots and Moonbeams" (Burke, Van Heusen) – 3:43
24. "Daybreak" (Ferde Grofe, Harold Adamson) – 2:43
  Recorded on May 2, 1961
25. "The One I Love (Belongs to Somebody Else)" [with Sy Oliver] (Isham Jones, Gus Kahn) – 2:49
  Recorded on May 3, 1961

=== Disc two ===
1. "There Are Such Things" (George W. Meyer, Stanley Adams, Abel Baer) – 3:13
2. "It's Always You" (Burke, Van Heusen) – 2:48
3. "It Started All Over Again" (Bill Carey, Carl T. Fischer) – 2:31
4. "East of the Sun (And West of the Moon)" (Brooks Bowman) – 3:26
  Recorded on May 3, 1961
5. "The Curse of an Aching Heart" (Henry Fink, Al Piantadosi) – 2:06
6. "Love Walked In" (G. Gershwin, I. Gershwin) – 2:19
7. "Please Don't Talk About Me When I'm Gone" (Sidney Clare, Sam H. Stept) – 2:56
8. "Have You Met Miss Jones?" (Richard Rodgers, Lorenz Hart) – 2:30
  Recorded on May 18, 1961
9. "Don't Be That Way" (Benny Goodman, Mitchell Parish, Edgar Sampson) – 2:41
10. "I Never Knew" (Ted Fio Rito, Kahn) – 2:14
11. "Falling in Love with Love" (Rodgers, Hart) – 1:49
12. "It's a Wonderful World" (Adamson, Jan Savitt, Johnny Watson) – 2:17
  Recorded on May 19, 1961
13. "Don't Cry, Joe (Let Her Go, Let Her Go, Let Her Go)" (Joe Marsala) – 3:05
14. "You're Nobody till Somebody Loves You" (James Cavanaugh, Russ Morgan, Larry Stock) – 4:09
15. "Moonlight on the Ganges" (Sherman Myers, Chester Wallace) – 3:18
16. "Granada" (Dorothy Dodd, Agustín Lara) – 3:38
  Recorded on May 23, 1961
17. "As You Desire Me" (Allie Wurbel) – 2:52
18. "Stardust" (Hoagy Carmichael, Parish) – 2:48
19. "Yesterdays" (Otto Harbach, Kern) – 3:45
20. "I Hadn't Anyone Till You" (Ray Noble) – 3:44
  Recorded on November 20, 1961
21. "It Might as Well Be Spring" (Rodgers, Oscar Hammerstein II) – 3:15
22. "Prisoner of Love" (Russ Columbo, Leo Robin, Clarence Gaskill) – 3:50
23. "That's All" (Bob Haymes, Alan Brandt) – 3:21
24. "Don't Take Your Love From Me" (Henry Nemo) – 4:05
  Recorded on November 21, 1961

=== Disc three ===
1. "Misty" (Erroll Garner, Burke) – 2:41
  Recorded on November 21, 1961
2. "Come Rain or Come Shine" (Arlen, Johnny Mercer) – 4:06
3. "Night and Day" (Porter) – 3:37
4. "All or Nothing at All" (Jack Lawrence, Arthur Altman) – 3:43
5. "Pocketful of Miracles" (Cahn, Van Heusen) – 2:39
6. "Name It and It's Yours" (Cahn, Van Heusen) – 3:14
  Recorded on November 22, 1961
7. "The Song is Ended (but the Melody Lingers On)" (Berlin) – 3:25
8. "All Alone" (Berlin) – 2:42
9. "Charmaine" (Ernö Rapeé, Lew Pollack) – 3:17
10. "When I Lost You" (Berlin) – 3:43
  Recorded on January 15, 1962
11. "Remember" (Berlin) – 3:23
12. "Together" (B.G. DeSylva, Lew Brown, Ray Henderson, Stephen Ballantine) – 3:21
13. "The Girl Next Door" (Hugh Martin, Ralph Blane) – 3:18
14. "Indiscreet" (Cahn, Van Heusen) – 3:52
  Recorded on January 16, 1962
15. "What'll I Do?" (Berlin) – 3:15
16. "Oh, How I Miss You Tonight" (Benny Davis, Joe Burke, Mark Fisher) – 3:21
17. "Are You Lonesome Tonight?" (Roy Turk, Lou Handman) – 3:31
18. "Come Waltz with Me" (Cahn, Van Heusen) – 2:53
  Recorded on January 17, 1962
19. "Everybody's Twistin'" (Bloom, Koehler) – 2:31
20. "Nothing But the Best" (Johny Rotella) – 3:02
  Recorded on February 27, 1962
21. "The Boys' Night Out" (Cahn, Van Heusen) – 2:48
  Recorded on March 2, 1962

=== Disc four ===
1. "I'm Beginning to See the Light" (Johnny Hodges, Harry James, Duke Ellington, Don George) – 2:34
2. "I Get a Kick Out of You" (Porter) – 3:14
3. "Ain't She Sweet" (Milton Ager, Jack Yellen) – 2:07
4. "I Love You" (Porter) – 2:16
5. "They Can't Take That Away from Me" (G. Gershwin, I. Gershwin) – 2:41
6. "Love Is Just around the Corner" (Lewis E. Gensler, Robin) – 2:27
  Recorded on April 10, 1962
7. "At Long Last Love" (Porter) – 2:14
8. "Serenade In Blue" (Harry Warren, Mack Gordon) – 2:58
9. "Goody Goody" (Mercer, Matty Malneck) – 1:47
10. "Don'cha Go 'Way Mad" (Jimmy Mundy, Al Stillman, Illinois Jacquet) – 3:12
11. "Tangerine" (Victor Schertzinger, Mercer) – 2:03
12. "Pick Yourself Up" (Kern, Fields) – 2:33
  Recorded on April 11, 1962
13. "If I Had You" (Jimmy Campbell, Reginald Connelly, Ted Shapiro) – 4:07
14. "The Very Thought of You" (Noble) – 3:34
15. "I'll Follow My Secret Heart" (Noël Coward) – 3:16
16. "A Garden in the Rain" (James Dyrenforth, Carroll Gibbons) – 3:24
  Recorded on June 12, 1962
17. "London by Night" (Carroll Coates) – 3:20
18. "The Gypsy" (Billy Reid) – 3:21
19. "Roses of Picardy" (Frederic E. Weatherly, Haydn Wood) – 3:01
20. "A Nightingale Sang in Berkeley Square" (Eric Maschwitz, Manning Sherwin) – 3:54
  Recorded on June 13, 1962
21. "We'll Meet Again" (Hughie Charles, Ross Parker) – 3:44
22. "Now Is the Hour" (Maewa Kaihan, Clement Scott, Dorothy Stewart) – 2:51
23. "We'll Gather Lilacs in the Spring" (Ivor Novello) – 3:15
  Recorded on June 14, 1962
24. "The Look of Love" (Cahn, Van Heusen) – 2:44
25. "I Left My Heart in San Francisco" (George Cory, Douglass Cross) – 2:54
  Recorded on August 27, 1962

=== Disc five ===
1. "Nice Work If You Can Get It" (G. Gershwin, I. Gershwin) – 2:37
2. "Please Be Kind" (Saul Chaplin, Cahn) – 2:43
3. "I Won't Dance" (Kern, Jimmy McHugh, Hammerstein, Fields, Harbach) – 4:07
4. "Learnin' the Blues" (Dolores Vicki Silvers) – 4:25
  Recorded on October 2, 1962
5. "I'm Gonna Sit Right Down (And Write Myself a Letter)" (Fred Ahlert, Joe Young) – 2:36
6. "I Only Have Eyes for You" (Warren, Al Dubin) – 3:31
7. "My Kind of Girl" (Leslie Bricusse) – 4:37
8. "Pennies from Heaven" (Arthur Johnston, Burke) – 3:29
9. "(Love Is) The Tender Trap" (Cahn, Van Heusen) – 2:37
10. "Looking at the World Through Rose Colored Glasses" (Jimmy Steiger, Tommy Malie) – 2:32
  Recorded on October 3, 1962
11. "Me and My Shadow" [with Sammy Davis Jr.] (Dave Dreyer, Al Jolson, Rose) – 3:06
  Recorded on October 22, 1962
12. "Come Blow Your Horn" (Cahn, Van Heusen) – 3:08
13. "Call Me Irresponsible" (Cahn, Van Heusen) – 2:56
  Recorded on January 21, 1963
14. "Lost in the Stars" (Maxwell Anderson, Kurt Weill) – 4:11
15. "My Heart Stood Still" (Rodgers, Hart) – 3:06
16. "Ol' Man River" (Hammerstein, Kern) – 4:29
  Recorded on February 18, 1963
17. "This Nearly Was Mine" (Rodgers, Hammerstein) – 2:49
18. "You'll Never Walk Alone" (Rodgers, Hammerstein) – 3:11
19. "I Have Dreamed" (Rodgers, Hammerstein) – 3:01
  Recorded on February 19, 1963
20. "Bewitched, Bothered and Bewildered" (Rodgers, Hart) – 3:02
21. "California" (Cahn, Van Heusen) – 3:36
22. "America the Beautiful" (Katharine Lee Bates, Samuel A. Ward) – 2:21
  Recorded on February 20, 1963

=== Disc six ===
1. "Soliloquy" (Rodgers, Hammerstein) – 8:05
2. "You Brought a New Kind of Love to Me" (Fain, Kahal, Norman) – 2:38
  Recorded on February 21, 1963
3. "In the Wee Small Hours of the Morning" (David Mann, Bob Hilliard) – 2:43
4. "Nancy (With the Laughing Face)" (Phil Silvers, Van Heusen) – 3:37
5. "Young at Heart" (Leigh, Johnny Richards) – 2:54
6. "The Second Time Around" – 3:03
7. "All the Way" (Cahn, Van Heusen) – 3:27
  Recorded on April 29, 1963
8. "Witchcraft" (Cy Coleman, Leigh) – 2:37
9. "(How Little It Matters) How Little We Know" (Leigh, Phil Springer) – 2:19
10. "Put Your Dreams Away (For Another Day)" (Paul Mann, Weiss, Ruth Lowe) – 3:12
11. "I've Got You Under My Skin" (Porter) – 3:26
12. "Oh! What It Seemed to Be" (Bennie Benjamin, George David Weiss, Frankie Carle) – 2:45
  Recorded on April 30, 1963
13. "We Open in Venice" [with Dean Martin and Sammy Davis Jr.] (Porter) – 2:13
  Recorded on July 10, 1963
14. "Old Devil Moon" (Yip Harburg, Burton Lane) – 2:59
15. "When I'm Not Near the Girl I Love" (Harburg, Lane) – 3:25
16. "Guys and Dolls" [with Dean Martin] (Frank Loesser) – 2:50
17. "I've Never Been in Love Before" (Loesser) – 2:57
  Recorded on July 18, 1963
18. "So in Love" (Reprise) [with Keely Smith] (Porter) – 2:53
19. "Twin Soliloquies (Wonder How It Feels)" [with Keely Smith] (Rodgers, Hammerstein) – 1:38
  Recorded on July 24, 1963
20. "Some Enchanted Evening" (Rodgers, Hammerstein) – 3:29
21. "Some Enchanted Evening" (Reprise) [with Rosemary Clooney] – 3:21
  Recorded on July 25, 1963

=== Disc seven ===
1. "Luck Be a Lady" (Loesser) – 5:18
  Recorded on July 25, 1963
2. "Fugue for Tinhorns" [with Bing Crosby and Dean Martin] (Loesser) – 1:31
3. "The Oldest Established (Permanent Floating Crap Game in New York)" [with Bing Crosby and Dean Martin] (Loesser) – 2:33
  Recorded on July 29, 1963
4. "Here's to the Losers" (Jack Segal, Robert Wells) – 3:04
5. "Love Isn't Just for the Young" (Bernie Knee) – 2:57
  Recorded on July 31, 1963
6. "Have Yourself a Merry Little Christmas" (Hugh Martin, Ralph Blane) – 3:54
  Recorded on October 13, 1963
7. "Talk to Me Baby" (Robert E. Dolan, Mercer) – 2:58
8. "Stay With Me (Main Theme from The Cardinal)" (Leigh, Jerome Moross) – 3:04
  Recorded on December 3, 1963
9. "Early American" (Burke, Van Heusen) – 3:34
10. "The House I Live In (That's America To Me)" (Lewis Allan, Earl Robinson) – 3:39
11. "You're a Lucky Fellow, Mr. Smith" (Francis Burke, Hughie Prince, Don Raye) – 3:46
  Recorded on January 2, 1964
12. "The Way You Look Tonight" (Kern, Fields) – 3:22
13. "Three Coins in the Fountain" (Cahn, Jule Styne) – 3:46
14. "Swinging on a Star" (Burke, Van Heusen) – 2:53
15. "The Continental" (Herb Magidson, Con Conrad) – 3:14
16. "In the Cool, Cool, Cool of the Evening" (Mercer, Carmichael) – 1:51
  Recorded on January 27, 1964
17. "It Might as Well Be Spring" (Rodgers, Hammerstein) – 3:26
18. "Secret Love" (Paul Francis Webster, Fain) – 3:54
19. "Moon River" (Henry Mancini, Mercer) – 3:20
20. "Days of Wine and Roses" (Mancini, Mercer) – 2:16
21. "Love Is A Many-Splendored Thing" (Webster, Fain) – 3:22
  Recorded on January 28, 1964
22. "Let Us Break Bread Together" [with Bing Crosby] (Roy Ringwald) – 3:39
23. "You Never Had It So Good" [with Bing Crosby] (Cahn, Van Heusen) – 3:01
  Recorded on February 4, 1964

=== Disc eight ===
1. "I Can't Believe I'm Losing You" (Don Costa, Phil Zeller) – 2:43
2. "My Kind of Town" (Cahn, Van Heusen) – 3:09
3. "I Like to Lead When I Dance" (Cahn, Van Heusen) – 4:07
  Recorded on April 8, 1964
4. "Style" [with Bing Crosby and Dean Martin] (Cahn, Van Heusen) – 4:28
5. "Mister Booze" [with Bing Crosby, Dean Martin and Sammy Davis, Jr.] (Cahn, Van Heusen) – 5:01
6. "Don't Be a Do-Badder (Finale)" [with Bing Crosby, Dean Martin and Sammy Davis, Jr.] (Cahn, Van Heusen) – 1:16
  Recorded on April 10, 1964
7. "The Best is Yet to Come" (Coleman, Leigh) – 3:10
8. "I Wanna Be Around" (Mercer, Sadie Vimmerstedt) – 2:25
9. "I Believe in You" (Loesser) – 2:21
10. "Fly Me to the Moon (In Other Words)" (Bart Howard) – 2:30
  Recorded on June 9, 1964
11. "Hello, Dolly!" (Jerry Herman) – 2:45
12. "The Good Life" (Sacha Distel, Jack Reardon) – 3:10
13. "I Wish You Love" (Léo Chauliac, Charles Trenet, Albert Beach) – 2:56
  Recorded on June 10, 1964
14. "I Can't Stop Loving You" (Don Gibson) – 3:00
15. "More (Theme From Mondo Cane)" (Riz Ortolani, Nino Oliviero, Marcello Ciorciolini, Norman Newell) – 3:05
16. "Wives and Lovers" (Burt Bacharach, Hal David) – 2:50
  Recorded on June 12, 1964
17. "An Old-Fashioned Christmas" (Cahn, Van Heusen) – 3:45
18. "I Heard the Bells on Christmas Day" (Henry Wadsworth Longfellow, Johnny Marks) – 2:36
19. "The Little Drummer Boy" (Katherine K. Davis) – 3:03
  Recorded on June 16, 1964
20. "Go Tell It on the Mountain" [with Bing Crosby] (Traditional, John Wesley Work III) – 3:23
21. "We Wish You the Merriest" [with Bing Crosby] (Les Brown) – 2:14
  Recorded on June 19, 1964
22. "Softly, as I Leave You" (Hal Shaper, Antonio DeVito, Giorgio Calabrese) – 2:50
23. "Then Suddenly Love" (Ray Alfred, Paul Vance) – 2:15
24. "Since Marie Has Left Paree" (Hy Glaser, Jerry Solomon) – 1:57
25. "Available" (Cahn, Ned Wynn, L.B. Marks) – 2:47
  Recorded on July 17, 1964

=== Disc nine ===
1. "Pass Me By" (Coleman, Leigh) – 2:25
2. "Emily" (Johnny Mandel, Mercer) – 2:58
3. "Dear Heart" (Jay Livingston, Ray Evans, Mancini) – 2:43
  Recorded on October 3, 1964
4. "Somewhere in Your Heart" (Russell Faith, Clarence Kehner) – 2:29
5. "Any Time at All" (Baker Knight) – 2:22
  Recorded on November 10, 1964
6. "Don't Wait Too Long" (Sunny Skylar) – 3:04
7. "September Song" (Weill, Anderson) – 3:30
8. "Last Night When We Were Young" (Arlen, Harburg) – 3:33
9. "Hello, Young Lovers" (Rodgers, Hammerstein) – 3:41
  Recorded on April 13, 1965
10. "I See It Now" (Alec Wilder, William Engvick) – 2:50
11. "When the Wind Was Green" (Henry Stinson) – 3:22
12. "Once Upon a Time" (Charles Strouse, Lee Adams) – 3:30
  Recorded on April 14, 1965
13. "How Old Am I?" (Gordon Jenkins) – 3:30
14. "It Was a Very Good Year" (Ervin Drake) – 4:25
15. "The Man in the Looking Glass" (Howard) – 3:25
16. "This Is All I Ask" (Jenkins) – 3:03
17. "It Gets Lonely Early" (Van Heusen, Cahn) – 2:57
  Recorded on April 22, 1965
18. "The September of My Years" (Van Heusen, Cahn) – 3:12
  Recorded on May 27, 1965
19. "Tell Her (You Love Her Each Day)" (Gil Ward, Charles Watkins) 2:42
20. "When Somebody Loves You" (Cahn, Van Heusen) – 1:54
  Recorded on April 14, 1965
21. "Forget Domani" (Newell, Ortolani) – 2:36
  Recorded on May 6, 1965
22. "Ev'rybody Has the Right to Be Wrong! (At Least Once)" (Cahn, Van Heusen) – 2:07
23. "I'll Only Miss Her When I Think of Her" (Cahn, Van Heusen) – 2:52
24. "Golden Moment" (Kenny Jacobson, Rhoda Roberts) – 2:57
  Recorded on August 23, 1965

=== Disc ten ===
1. "Come Fly with Me" (Cahn, Van Heusen) – 3:11
2. "I'll Never Smile Again" (Lowe) – 2:14
  Recorded on October 11, 1965
3. "Moment to Moment" (Mancini, Mercer) – 2:57
4. "Love and Marriage" (Cahn, Van Heusen) – 2:12
  Recorded on October 21, 1965
5. "Moon Song" (Sam Coslow, Johnston) – 3:03
6. "Moon Love" (M. David, André Kostelanetz) – 4:14
7. "The Moon Got In My Eyes" (Burke, Johnston) – 2:52
8. "Moonlight Serenade" (Glenn Miller, Parish) – 3:26
9. "Reaching for the Moon" (Berlin) – 3:05
  Recorded on November 29, 1965
10. "I Wished on the Moon" (Dorothy Parker, Ralph Rainger) – 2:53
11. "Moonlight Becomes You" (Burke, Van Heusen) – 2:46
12. "Moonlight Mood" (Adamson, Peter DeRose) – 3:08
13. "Oh, You Crazy Moon" (Burke, Van Heusen) – 3:12
14. "The Moon Was Yellow (And The Night Is Young)" (Ahlert, Edgar Leslie) – 3:04
  Recorded on November 30, 1965
15. "Strangers in the Night" (Bert Kaempfert, Charles Singleton, Eddie Snyder) – 2:25
  Recorded on April 11, 1966
16. "My Baby Just Cares for Me" (Walter Donaldson, Gus Kahn) – 2:30
17. "Yes Sir, That's My Baby" (Donaldson, Kahn) – 2:08
18. "You're Driving Me Crazy!" (Donaldson) – 2:15
19. "The Most Beautiful Girl in the World" (Rodgers, Hart) – 2:24
  Recorded on May 11, 1966
20. "Summer Wind" (Heinz Meier, Hans Bradtke, Mercer) – 2:53
21. "All or Nothing at All" – 3:57
22. "Call Me" (Tony Hatch) – 3:07
23. "On a Clear Day (You Can See Forever)" (Alan Jay Lerner, Frederick Loewe) – 3:17
24. "Downtown" (Hatch) – 2:14
  Recorded on May 16, 1966

=== Disc eleven ===
1. "That's Life" (Kelly Gordon, Dean Thompson) – 3:10
  Recorded on October 18, 1966
2. "Give Her Love" (Jim Harbert) – 2:14
3. "What Now My Love" (Gilbert Bécaud, Pierre Leroyer, Carl Sigman) – 2:32
4. "Somewhere My Love (Lara's Theme)" (From Doctor Zhivago) (Maurice Jarre, Webster) – 2:19
5. "Winchester Cathedral" (Geoff Stephens) – 2:38
  Recorded on November 17, 1966
6. "I Will Wait for You" (Jacques Demy, Norman Gimbel, Michel Legrand) – 2:19
7. "You're Gonna Hear from Me" (André Previn, Dory Previn) – 2:51
8. "Sand and Sea" (Gilbert Bécaud, M. David, Maurice Vidalin) – 2:29
9. "The Impossible Dream (The Quest)" (Joe Darion, Mitch Leigh) – 2:34
  Recorded on November 18, 1966
10. "Baubles, Bangles and Beads" [with Antonio Carlos Jobim] (Robert Wright, George Forrest, Alexander Borodin) – 2:32
11. "I Concentrate on You" (Porter) – 2:32
12. "Dindi" (Ray Gilbert, Antonio Carlos Jobim, Aloysio de Oliveria) – 3:25
13. "Change Partners" (Berlin) – 2:40
  Recorded on January 30, 1967
14. "Quiet Nights of Quiet Stars (Corcovado)" (Jobim, Gene Lees) – 2:45
15. "If You Never Come to Me" (Jobim, Gilbert, de Oliveira) – 2:10
16. "The Girl from Ipanema" [with Antonio Carlos Jobim] (Jobim, Gimbel, de Moraes) – 3:00
17. "Meditation (Meditação)" (Jobim, Gimbel, Newton Mendonça) – 2:51
  Recorded on January 31, 1967
18. "Once I Loved (O Amor em Paz)" (Jobim, Gilbert, de Moraes) – 2:37
19. "How Insensitive (Insensatez)" [with Antonio Carlos Jobim] (Jobim, Gimbel, de Moraes) – 3:15
20. "Drinking Again" (Mercer, Doris Tauber) – 3:13
21. "Somethin' Stupid" [with Nancy Sinatra] (Carson Parks) – 2:45
  Recorded on February 1, 1967
22. "You Are There" (Harry Sukman, Webster) – 3:31
23. "The World We Knew (Over and Over)" (Kaempfert, Herb Rehbein, Sigman) – 2:50
  Recorded on June 29, 1967
24. "Born Free" (Don Black, John Barry) – 2:05
25. "This Is My Love" (James Harbert) – 3:37
  Recorded on July 24, 1967

=== Disc twelve ===
1. "This Is My Song" (Charles Chaplin) – 2:30
2. "Don't Sleep in the Subway" (Hatch, Jackie Trent) – 2:22
3. "Some Enchanted Evening" – 2:34
4. "This Town" (Lee Hazlewood) – 3:05
  Recorded on July 24, 1967
5. "Younger Than Springtime" (Rodgers, Hammerstein) – 2:42
  Recorded on September 10, 1967
6. "All I Need Is the Girl" (Stephen Sondheim, Styne) – 5:01
7. "Yellow Days" (Alarcon Carrillo, Alan Bernstein) – 5:00
8. "Indian Summer" (Victor Herbert, Dubin) – 4:14
9. "Come Back to Me" (Lane, Lerner) – 3:22
  Recorded on December 11, 1967
10. "Poor Butterfly" (Raymond Hubbell, John Golden) – 4:29
11. "Sunny" (Bobby Hebb) – 4:15
12. "I Like the Sunrise" (Ellington) – 5:02
13. "Follow Me" (Lerner, Loewe) – 3:56
  Recorded on December 12, 1967
14. "My Way of Life" (Kaempfert, Rehbein, Sigman) – 3:05
15. "Cycles" (Judith Caldwell) – 3:07
16. "Whatever Happened to Christmas?" (Jimmy Webb) – 3:05
  Recorded on July 24, 1968
17. "The Twelve Days of Christmas" [with Nancy Sinatra, Frank Sinatra, Jr., and Tina Sinatra] (Traditional, Cahn, Van Heusen) – 4:26
18. "The Bells of Christmas (Greensleeves)" [with Nancy Sinatra, Frank Sinatra, Jr., and Tina Sinatra] (Traditional, Cahn, Van Heusen) – 3:41
19. "I Wouldn't Trade Christmas" [with Nancy Sinatra, Frank Sinatra, Jr., and Tina Sinatra] (Cahn, Van Heusen) – 2:55
20. "The Christmas Waltz" (Cahn, Styne) – 3:12
  Recorded on August 12, 1968

=== Disc thirteen ===
1. "Blue Lace" (Bill Jacob, Patty Jacob, Ortolani) – 2:43
2. "Star!" (Cahn, Van Heusen) – 2:34
  Recorded on November 11, 1968
3. "Gentle On My Mind" (John Hartford) – 3:25
4. "By the Time I Get to Phoenix" (Webb) – 3:55
  Recorded on November 12, 1968
5. "Little Green Apples" (Bobby Russell) – 5:00
6. "Moody River" (Gary D. Bruce) – 2:33
7. "Pretty Colors" (Al Gorgoni, Chip Taylor) – 2:35
  Recorded on November 13, 1968
8. "Rain in My Heart" (Teddy Randazzo, Victoria Pike) – 3:20
9. "Wandering" (Caldwell) – 2:45
10. "Both Sides Now" (Joni Mitchell) – 2:55
  Recorded on November 14, 1968
11. "My Way" (Paul Anka, Claude François, Jacques Revaux, Gilles Thibault) – 4:35
  Recorded on December 30, 1968
12. "One Note Samba (Samba de Uma Nota Só)" [with Antonio Carlos Jobim] (Jobim, Mendonça) – 2:20
13. "Don't Ever Go Away (Por Causa de Voce)" (Gilbert, Delores Duran, Jobim) – 2:28
14. "Wave" (Jobim) – 3:25
  Recorded on February 11, 1969
15. "Bonita" (Gilbert, Jobim, Lees) – 3:39
16. "Someone to Light Up My Life" (de Moraes, Jobim, Lees) – 2:37
17. Desafinado" [with Antonio Carlos Jobim] (Lees, Jobim, Mendonça) – 3:00
18. "Drinking Water (Agua de Beber)" [with Antonio Carlos Jobim] (de Moraes, Jobim, Gimbel) – 2:35
  Recorded on February 12, 1969
19. "Song of the Sabiá" (Jobim, Chico Buarque, Gimbel) – 3:38
20. "This Happy Madness (Estrada Branca)" [with Antonio Carlos Jobim] (de Moraes, Jobim, Lees) – 2:57
21. "Triste" (Jobim) – 2:40
  Recorded on February 13, 1969

=== Disc fourteen ===
1. "All My Tomorrows" (Cahn, Van Heusen) – 4:35
2. "Didn't We?" (Webb) – 2:55
  Recorded on February 18, 1969
3. "Manhã De Carnaval (A Day in the Life of a Fool)" (Luiz Bonfá, Sigman) – 3:00
4. "Yesterday" (Lennon–McCartney) – 3:30
5. "If You Go Away" (Jacques Brel, Rod McKuen) – 3:30
  Recorded on February 20, 1969
6. "Watch What Happens" (Gimbel, Legrand) – 2:17
7. "For Once in My Life" (Ron Miller, Orlando Murden) – 2:50
8. "Mrs. Robinson" (Paul Simon) – 2:55
9. "Hallelujah, I Love Her So" (Ray Charles) – 2:47
  Recorded on February 24, 1969
10. "I've Been to Town" (McKuen) – 3:13
11. "Empty Is" (McKuen) – 2:46
12. "The Single Man" (McKuen) – 3:01
13. "Lonesome Cities" (McKuen) – 3:18
  Recorded on March 19, 1969
14. "The Beautiful Strangers" (McKuen) – 2:41
15. "A Man Alone" (McKuen) – 3:47
16. "Love's Been Good to Me" (McKuen) – 3:27
  Recorded on March 20, 1969
17. "Out Beyond the Window" (McKuen) – 2:45
18. "Night" (McKuen) – 2:25
19. "Some Traveling Music" (McKuen) – 2:36
20. "From Promise to Promise" (McKuen) – 1:31
  Recorded on March 21, 1969
21. "A Man Alone (Reprise)" – 1:30
  Recorded on March 20, 1969
22. "In the Shadow of the Moon" (Earl Brown, Heinz Keissling) – 2:55
  Recorded on March 25, 1969
23. "Forget to Remember" (Pike, Randazzo) – 2:58
24. "Goin' Out of My Head" (Randazzo, Bobby Weinstein) – 2:45
  Recorded on August 18, 1969

=== Disc fifteen ===
1. "I Would Be in Love (Anyway)" (Bob Gaudio, Jake Holmes) – 2:31
2. "The Train" (Gaudio, Holmes) – 3:26
3. "She Says" (Gaudio, Holmes) – 1:51
4. "Lady Day" (Gaudio, Holmes) – 2:47
  Recorded on August 25, 1969
5. "Watertown" (Gaudio, Holmes) – 3:36
6. "What's Now Is Now" (Gaudio, Holmes) – 4:04
  Recorded on August 26, 1969
7. "Goodbye (She Quietly Says)" (Gaudio, Holmes) – 3:06
8. "What a Funny Girl (You Used to Be)" (Gaudio, Holmes) – 3:00
  Recorded on August 27, 1969
9. "Elizabeth" (Gaudio, Holmes) – 3:38
10. "Michael and Peter" (Gaudio, Holmes) – 5:10
11. "For a While" (Gaudio, Holmes) – 3:09
  Recorded on October 31, 1969
12. "Lady Day" – 3:41
  Recorded on November 7, 1969
13. "I Will Drink the Wine" (Paul Ryan) – 3:30
14. "Bein' Green" (Joe Raposo) – 3:00
15. "My Sweet Lady" (John Denver) – 3:01
  Recorded on October 26, 1970
16. "Sunrise in the Morning" (Ryan) – 2:50
  Recorded on October 27, 1970
17. "I'm Not Afraid" (Jacques Brel, Gérard Jouannest, McKuen) – 3:39
18. "Something" (George Harrison) – 3:32
  Recorded on October 28, 1970
19. "Leaving on a Jet Plane" (Denver) – 2:25
20. "(They Long to Be) Close to You" (Bacharach, H. David) – 2:34
  Recorded on October 29, 1970
21. "Feelin' Kinda Sunday" [with Nancy Sinatra] (Nino Tempo, Annette Tucker, Kathy Wakefield) – 2:52
22. "Life's a Trippy Thing" [with Nancy Sinatra] (Howard Greenfield, Linda Laurie) – 2:42
23. "The Game Is Over" (Denver) – 2:37
  Recorded on November 2, 1970

=== Disc sixteen ===
1. "Bang Bang (My Baby Shot Me Down)" (Sonny Bono) – 3:37
2. "You Will Be My Music" (Raposo) – 3:52
3. "Noah" (Raposo) – 4:22
  Recorded on June 4, 1973
4. "Nobody Wins" (Kris Kristofferson) – 5:10
5. "The Hurt Doesn't Go Away" (Raposo) – 2:51
  Recorded on June 5, 1973
6. "Winners" (Raposo) – 2:53
7. "Let Me Try Again" ("Laisse Moi le Temps") (Anka, Cahn, Michel Jourdon) – 3:31
  Recorded on June 21, 1973
8. "Walk Away" (Elmer Bernstein, Leigh) – 2:57
9. "Send in the Clowns" (Sondheim) – 4:10
10. "There Used to Be a Ballpark" (Raposo) – 3:34
  Recorded on June 22, 1973
11. "You're So Right (For What's Wrong In My Life)" (Pike, Randazzo, Roger Joyce) – 4:03
12. "Dream Away" (John Williams, Paul Williams) – 4:22
  Recorded on August 10, 1973
13. "Bad, Bad Leroy Brown" (Jim Croce) – 2:49
14. "I'm Gonna Make It All the Way" (Floyd Huddleston) – 2:54
  Recorded on December 10, 1973
15. "Empty Tables" (Mercer, Van Heusen) – 3:03
16. "If" (David Gates) – 3:10
17. "The Summer Knows" (Alan and Marilyn Bergman, Legrand) – 2:44
  Recorded on May 7, 1974
18. "Sweet Caroline" (Neil Diamond) – 2:44
19. "You Turned My World Around" (Kaempfert, Rehbein, Kim Carnes, Dave Ellingson) – 2:50
  Recorded on May 8, 1974
20. "What Are You Doing the Rest of Your Life?" (A. Bergman, M. Bergman, Legrand) – 4:05
21. "Tie a Yellow Ribbon 'Round the Ole Oak Tree" (Russell Brown, Irwin Levine) – 3:07
22. "Satisfy Me One More Time" (Huddleston) – 2:22
  Recorded on May 21, 1974

=== Disc seventeen ===
1. "You Are the Sunshine of My Life" (Stevie Wonder) – 2:37
  Recorded on May 24, 1974
2. "Just as Though You Were Here" (John Benson Brooks, Eddie DeLange) – 4:23
3. "Everything Happens to Me" (Adair, Matt Dennis) – 3:43
  Recorded on September 24, 1974
4. "Anytime (I'll Be There)" (Anka) – 3:21
5. "The Only Couple on the Floor"(Irving Daine, Johnny Durrill) – 3:11
6. "I Believe I'm Gonna Love You" (Harry Lloyd, Gloria Sklerov) – 2:48
  Recorded on March 5, 1975
7. "The Saddest Thing of All" (M. Legrand, Pierre Leroyer, Edward Ruault, Sigman) – 3:29
  Recorded on August 18, 1975
8. "A Baby Just Like You" (Denver, Joe Henry) – 2:47
9. "Christmas Memories" (A. Bergman, M. Bergman, Costa) – 2:09
  Recorded on October 24, 1975
10. "I Sing the Songs (I Write the Songs)" (Bruce Johnston) – 3:51
11. "Empty Tables" – 2:48
12. "Send in the Clowns" – 3:39
  Recorded on February 5, 1976
13. "The Best I Ever Had" (Danny Hice, Ruby Hice) – 1:57
14. "Stargazer" (Diamond) – 2:58
  Recorded on June 21, 1976
15. "Dry Your Eyes" (Diamond, Robbie Robertson) – 3:02
16. "Like a Sad Song" (Denver) – 4:12
  Recorded on September 27, 1976
17. "I Love My Wife" (Coleman, Michael Stewart) – 3:10
  Recorded on November 12, 1976
18. "Night and Day" – 2:11
19. "All or Nothing at All" – 2:36
20. "Everybody Ought to Be in Love" (Anka) – 3:19
  Recorded on February 16, 1977
21. "Nancy (With the Laughing Face)" – 2:29
22. "Emily" – 2:59
  Recorded on March 9, 1977
23. "Linda" (Lawrence) – 2:44
24. "Sweet Lorraine" (Cliff Burwell, Parish) – 2:22
  Recorded on March 14, 1977

=== Disc eighteen ===
1. "Barbara" (David, Van Heusen) – 3:14
  Recorded on March 14, 1977
2. "I Had the Craziest Dream" (Gordon, Warren) – 3:13
  Recorded on July 17, 1979
3. "It Had to Be You" (Jones, Kahn) – 3:53
  Recorded on July 18, 1979
4. "You and Me (We Wanted It All)" (Carole Bayer Sager, Peter Allen) – 4:07
5. "MacArthur Park" (Webb) – 2:45
6. "Summer Me, Winter Me" (M. Bergman, A. Bergman, Legrand) – 4:02
  Recorded on August 20, 1979
7. "That's What God Looks Like to Me" (Stan Irwin, Lan O'Kun) – 2:55
8. "For the Good Times" [with Eileen Farrell] (Kristofferson) – 4:41
9. "Love Me Tender" (Vera Matson, Elvis Presley) – 3:34
  Recorded on August 21, 1979
10. "Just the Way You Are" (Billy Joel) – 3:26
11. "Song Sung Blue" (Diamond) – 2:47
12. "Isn't She Lovely?" (Wonder) – 2:04
  Recorded on August 22, 1979
13. "My Shining Hour" (Arlen, Mercer) – 3:21
14. "All of You" (Porter) – 1:42
15. "More Than You Know" (Rose, Eliscu, Youmans) – 3:22
  Recorded on September 17, 1979
16. "The Song Is You" (Kern, Hammerstein) – 2:39
17. "But Not for Me" (G. Gershwin, I. Gershwin) – 3:50
18. "Street of Dreams" (Sam M. Lewis, Victor Young) – 3:32
19. "They All Laughed" (G. Gershwin, I. Gershwin) – 2:49
  Recorded on September 18, 1979
20. "Let's Face the Music and Dance" – 2:50
21. "Theme from New York, New York" (Fred Ebb, John Kander) – 3:26
  Recorded on September 19, 1979
22. "Something" – 4:42
  Recorded on December 3, 1979

=== Disc nineteen ===
1. "What Time Does the Next Miracle Leave?" (Jenkins) – 10:44
2. "World War None!" (Jenkins) – 4:27
  Recorded on December 18, 1979
3. "The Future" (Jenkins) – 4:05
4. "The Future (Continued): I've Been There" (Jenkins) – 3:33
5. "The Future (Conclusion): Song Without Words" (Jenkins) – 6:00
  Recorded on December 17, 1979
6. "Finale: Before the Music Ends" (Jenkins) – 9:46
  Recorded on December 18, 1979
7. "Bang Bang (My Baby Shot Me Down)" – 3:24
8. "Everything Happens to Me" – 4:11
9. Medley: "The Gal That Got Away"/"It Never Entered My Mind" (Arlen, I. Gershwin)/(Hart, Rodgers) – 5:05
  Recorded on April 8, 1981
10. "Thanks for the Memory" (Robin, Rainger) – 4:25
11. "I Loved Her" (Jenkins) – 4:04
12. "A Long Night" (Wilder, Loonis McGlohon) – 3:44
  Recorded on July 20, 1981
13. "South – To a Warmer Place" (Wilder, McGlohon) – 3:45
14. "Say Hello!" (Richard Behrke, Cahn) – 2:25
  Recorded on July 21, 1981
15. "Good Thing Going (Going Gone)" (Sondheim) – 3:53
  Recorded on August 19, 1981

=== Disc twenty ===
1. "Monday Morning Quarterback" (Costa, Pamela Phillips-Oland) – 4:38
2. "Hey Look, No Cryin'" (Styne, Susan Birkenhead) – 4:27
  Recorded on September 10, 1981
3. "To Love a Child" [with Nikki Costa] (H. David, Raposo) – 3:21
  Recorded on December 5, 1981
4. "Love Makes Us Whatever We Want to Be" (Cahn, Styne) – 2:39
5. "Searching" (Cahn, Styne) – 3:47
  Recorded on August 17, 1982
6. "Here's to the Band" (Sharman Howe, Alfred Nittoli, Artie Schroeck) – 4:11
7. "All The Way Home" (Randazzo) – 3:54
  Recorded on January 25, 1983
8. "It's Sunday" (Birkenhead, Styne) – 3:36
  Recorded on February 28, 1983
9. "L.A. Is My Lady" (A. Bergman, M. Bergman, Quincy Jones, Peggy Lipton) – 3:12
10. "Until the Real Thing Comes Along" (Mann Holiner, Alberta Nichols, Cahn, S. Chaplin, L.E. Freeman) – 3:03
11. "After You've Gone" (Henry Creamer, Turner Layton) – 3:15
  Recorded on April 13, 1984
12. "The Best of Everything" (Ebb, Kander) – 2:45
13. "It's All Right With Me" (Porter) – 2:39
14. "A Hundred Years from Today" (J. Young, Washington, V. Young) – 3:04
  Recorded on April 16, 1984
15. "How Do You Keep the Music Playing?" (A. Bergman, M. Bergman, Legrand) – 3:49
16. "Teach Me Tonight" (Cahn, Gene de Paul) – 3:44
17. "If I Should Lose You" (Rainger, Robin) – 2:36
  Recorded on April 17, 1984
18. "Stormy Weather" (Arlen, Koehler) – 3:38
  Recorded on May 13, 1984
19. "Mack the Knife" (Marc Blitzstein, Bertolt Brecht, Weill) – 4:50
20. "The Girls I Never Kissed" (Jerry Leiber, Mike Stoller) – 3:31
21. "Only One to a Customer" (Leigh, Styne) – 2:48
  Recorded on October 30, 1986
22. "My Foolish Heart" (Washington, V. Young) – 2:47
  Recorded on June 6, 1988

== Contributing performers, arrangers and producers ==
- Frank Sinatra – vocals
- Dean Martin
- Sammy Davis Jr.
- Bing Crosby
- Keely Smith
- Rosemary Clooney
- Nancy Sinatra
- Frank Sinatra Jr.
- Tina Sinatra
- Antonio Carlos Jobim – vocals, guitar
- Eileen Farrell
- Bill Miller – piano
- Count Basie and His Orchestra
- Duke Ellington and His Orchestra
- Johnny Mandel – arranger
- Skip Martin
- Dick Reynolds
- Nelson Riddle
- Sy Oliver – arranger, vocals
- Billy May
- Don Costa
- Gordon Jenkins
- Neal Hefti
- Robert Farnon
- Bill Loose
- Marty Paich
- Gil Grau
- Jack Halloran
- Roy Ringwald
- Quincy Jones
- Harry Betts
- Ernie Freeman
- Torrie Zito
- Laurindo Almeida
- Fred Stulce
- Claus Ogerman
- Billy Strange
- H. B. Barnum
- Eumir Deodato
- Charles Calello
- Joseph Scott
- Lennie Hayton
- Al Capps
- Joe Beck
- Tony Mottola
- Joe Parnello
- Sam Nestico
- Frank Foster
- Bob Florence
