= America, I Hear You Singing =

Studio album by Frank Sinatra, Bing Crosby, Fred Waring
- Released: April 1964 (LP); June 2010 (CD)
- Recorded: January 2–February 4, 1964
- Studio: Los Angeles
- Genres: Traditional pop, patriotic
- Length: 32:39
- Labels: Reprise; F 2020
- Producer: Sonny Burke

Frank Sinatra chronology
Sinatra Sings Days of Wine and Roses, Moon River, and Other Academy Award Winners (1964)	America, I Hear You Singing (1964)	Robin and the 7 Hoods (1964)

Bing Crosby chronology
Return to Paradise Islands (1964)	America, I Hear You Singing (1964)	Robin and the 7 Hoods (1964)

Professional ratings
Review scores
Source	Rating
Allmusic	2.5/5 stars

America, I Hear You Singing is an album recorded and released in 1964 by American singers Frank Sinatra and Bing Crosby, backed by Fred Waring's Pennsylvanians. The album is a collection of patriotic songs, recorded as a tribute to the assassinated president John F. Kennedy. The artists would collaborate again for the album 12 Songs of Christmas, released later the same year.

An abridged version of the album was reissued as This Land Is Your Land (H 30931) on Columbia's budget label Harmony in 1971. The album received its first release on CD in 2010. The tracks featuring Frank Sinatra were included on the 1995 box set The Complete Reprise Studio Recordings.

Sinatra's daughter, Nancy Sinatra, said the album reflected her father's deepest beliefs. "I love my father's patriotism," she wrote. "I love the fact that he is so open and honest about his feelings for and about our nation. This beautiful album is an example of his deep love and respect for the U.S.A."

== Reception ==
A critic at Variety magazine liked the album, commenting, "This is an impressive gathering of top names for a patriotic paean in a swinging format. Backed by Fred Waring's orchestra and chorus, Bing Crosby and Frank Sinatra singly and in tandem deliver a fine collection of flag-wavers."

The album first appeared on the Billboard Top LPs chart in the issue of May 30, 1964, ranked at No. 130. It was still on the chart seven weeks later, ranked at No. 125.

== Track listing ==
All tracks feature Fred Waring and the Pennsylvanians.

Side One
No.	Title	Writer(s)	Performer/Arranger	Length
1.	"America, I Hear You Singing"	Tom Scott	arr. Tom Scott	0:53
2.	"This Is a Great Country"	Irving Berlin	Bing Crosby, arr. Dick Reynolds/Jack Halloran	2:41
3.	"The House I Live In"	Lewis Allan, Earl Robinson	Frank Sinatra, arr. Nelson Riddle	3:39
4.	"The Hills of Home"	Floride Calhoun, Oscar Fox	arr. Roy Ringwald	4:39
5.	"This Land Is Your Land"	Woody Guthrie	Bing Crosby, arr. Reynolds/Halloran	3:25
6.	"Give Me Your Tired, Your Poor"	Emma Lazarus, Irving Berlin	arr. Roy Ringwald	3:01

Side Two
No.	Title	Writer(s)	Performer / Arranger	Length
1.	"You're a Lucky Fellow, Mr. Smith"	Francis Burke, Hughie Prince, Don Raye	Frank Sinatra, arr. Reynolds/Halloran	3:46
2.	"A Home in the Meadow"	Robert Emmett Dolan, Sammy Cahn	Bing Crosby, arr. Hawley Ades	2:50
3.	"Early American"	Johnny Burke, Jimmy Van Heusen	Frank Sinatra, arr. Nelson Riddle	3:34
4.	"You Never Had It So Good"	Sammy Cahn, Jimmy Van Heusen	Crosby, Sinatra, arr. Reynolds/Halloran	3:01
5.	"Let Us Break Bread Together"	Traditional	Crosby, Sinatra, arr. Roy Ringwald	3:39
6.	"The Stars and Stripes Forever"	John Philip Sousa	arr. Harry Simeone	2:52

== Personnel ==
- Frank Sinatra – vocals
- Bing Crosby – vocals
- Fred Waring and the Pennsylvanians – vocals
