= The Complete Recordings Nineteen Thirty-Nine =

Compilation album by Frank Sinatra
- Released: August 29, 1995
- Recorded: 1939
- Genre: Jazz; big band
- Label: Sony Records

Frank Sinatra chronology
Frank Sinatra Sings the Select Rodgers & Hart (1995)	The Complete Recordings Nineteen Thirty-Nine (1995)	Sinatra 80th: Live in Concert (1995)

The Complete Recordings Nineteen Thirty-Nine is a 1995 compilation album by Frank Sinatra, containing 21 songs he had recorded when he started his singing career in 1939 with Harry James.

== Track listing ==
1. "From the Bottom of My Heart" (Roy Ingraham, Jack Murray) - 3:13
2. "Melancholy Mood" (William Schumann, V. Knight) - 3:03
3. "My Buddy" (Gus Kahn, Walter Donaldson) - 2:53
4. "It's Funny to Everyone but Me" (Dave Franklin, Isham Jones) - 2:54
5. "Here Comes the Night" (Frank Loesser, H. Edelstein, C. Hohengarten) - 2:47
6. "All or Nothing at All" (Jack Lawrence, Arthur Altman) - 2:56
7. "On a Little Street in Singapore" (Peter de Rose, Billy Hill) - 2:48
8. "Who Told You I Cared?" (George Whiting, Bert Reisfeld) - 2:37
9. "Ciribiribin (They're So in Love)" (R. Thaler, Alberto Pestalozza) - 2:25
10. "Every Day of My Life" (Harry James, B. Hays, M. Beck) - 2:55
11. "From the Bottom of My Heart" - 3:21
12. "Melancholy Mood" - 3:10
13. "It's Funny to Everyone but Me" (w.m. Jack Lawrence) - 2:50
14. "All or Nothing at All" - 2:57
15. "Stardust" (Hoagy Carmichael, Mitchell Parish) - 3:59
16. "Wishing (Will Make It So)" (Buddy DeSylva) - 3:47
17. "If I Didn't Care" (Lawrence) - 3:27
18. "The Lamp Is Low" (Parish, Rose, Maurice Ravel) - 2:00
19. "My Love for You" (Abner Silver, Sid Wayne) - 2:31
20. "Moon Love" [Adapted From Tchaikovsky's 5th Symphony, 2nd Movement] (Mack David, André Kostelanetz) - 2:57
21. "This Is No Dream" (Benny Davis, Ted Shapiro, Tommy Dorsey) - 3:18
