= Duets II =

Duets II may refer to:

- Duets II (Frank Sinatra album)
- Duets II (Tony Bennett album)
