= Everything Happens to Me =

Everything Happens to Me may refer to:

- "Everything Happens to Me" (song), a 1940 pop song, written by Tom Adair and Matt Dennis
- Everything Happens to Me (Frank Sinatra album), a 1996 Frank Sinatra compilation album featuring the above song
- Everything Happens to Me (Kirk Lightsey and Chet Baker album), a 1984 album by the Kirk Lightsey Trio with Chet Baker featuring the above song
- Everything Happens to Me (1980 film), a 1980 Italian children's comedy film
- Everything Happens to Me (1938 film), a 1938 British comedy film
