= Frank Sinatra Sings the Select Johnny Mercer =

Compilation album by Frank Sinatra
- Released: April 4, 1995
- Recorded: 1953–1961
- Genre: Traditional pop; vocal jazz
- Length: 50:44
- Label: Capitol

Frank Sinatra chronology
Duets II (1994)	Frank Sinatra Sings the Select Johnny Mercer (1995)	Frank Sinatra Sings the Select Rodgers & Hart (1995)

Frank Sinatra Sings the Select Johnny Mercer is a 1995 compilation album by Frank Sinatra, that has him singing the songs written by Johnny Mercer.

== Track listing ==
- All songs written by Johnny Mercer.
1. "Too Marvelous for Words" (Johnny Mercer, Richard A. Whiting) - 2:29
2. "Day In, Day Out" [Ballad Version] (Mercer, Rube Bloom) - 3:19
3. "Laura" (Mercer, David Raksin) - 3:28
4. "Jeepers Creepers" (Mercer, Harry Warren) - 2:24
5. "Blues in the Night" (Mercer, Harold Arlen) - 4:44
6. "Something's Gotta Give" (Mercer) - 2:38
7. "Fools Rush In (Where Angels Fear to Tread)" (Mercer, Bloom) - 3:22
8. "P.S. I Love You" (Mercer, Gordon Jenkins) - 4:21
9. "(Ah, the Apple Trees) When the World Was Young" (Mercer, M. Philippe-Gerard, Angele Marie T. Vannier) - 3:47
10. "That Old Black Magic" (Merer, Arlen) - 4:05
11. "Autumn Leaves" (Mercer, Jacques Prévert, Joseph Kosma) - 2:52
12. "I Thought About You" (Mercer, Jimmy Van Heusen) - 2:30
13. "Dream" (Mercer) - 2:57
14. "Day In - Day Out" [Swingin' Version] - 3:25
15. "One for My Baby (and One More for the Road)" (Mercer, Arlen) - 4:23
