= Reprise Musical Repertory Theatre =

1963 series of albums by various artists

Studio album by Various artists
- Released: 1963
- Recorded: 1963, Los Angeles
- Genres: Vocal jazz; traditional pop
- Length: 2:50:27
- Label: Reprise
- Producer: Sonny Burke

Bing Crosby chronology
Holiday in Europe (1962)	Reprise Musical Repertory Theatre (1963)	Return to Paradise Islands (1964)

Frank Sinatra chronology
Sinatra's Sinatra (1963)	Reprise Musical Repertory Theatre (1963)	Sinatra Sings Days of Wine and Roses, Moon River, and Other Academy Award Winners (1964)

Dean Martin chronology
Dean "Tex" Martin Rides Again (1963)	Reprise Musical Repertory Theatre (1963)	Robin and the 7 Hoods (w/ Bing Crosby, Frank Sinatra, Sammy Davis Jr. and Peter Falk) (1964)

Professional ratings
Review scores
Source	Rating
Allmusic	link

Reprise Musical Repertory Theatre is a series of four 12" long playing vinyl albums recorded in Los Angeles in 1963. The four albums were sold through mail order as a box set in 1963, then released separately to retail in 1964. They were conceived and produced by Frank Sinatra. Morris Stoloff was the musical director and the A&R Director was Sonny Burke.

The four discs feature the scores of four popular Broadway musicals of the time – namely Finian's Rainbow (1947), Kiss Me, Kate (1948), South Pacific (1949), and Guys and Dolls (1950) – as performed by various Reprise artists.

The "Guys and Dolls" album was issued on CD in 1992 when the musical itself was enjoying a revival. All the albums were re-released in a box set on September 26, 2000.

== Track listing ==
All lyrics are written by Yip Harburg; all music is composed by Burton Lane.

Disc one – Finian's Rainbow
No.	Title	Singer(s)	Length
1.	"Overture"	̶	4:00
2.	"This Time of the Year"	The Hi-Lo's	2:28
3.	"How Are Things in Glocca Morra?"	Rosemary Clooney	3:06
4.	"If This Isn't Love"	Dean Martin, Hi-Lo's	2:32
5.	"Look to the Rainbow"	Clooney	2:54
6.	"Something Sort of Grandish"	Bing Crosby, Debbie Reynolds	2:26
7.	"Old Devil Moon"	Frank Sinatra	2:59
8.	"Necessity"	Sammy Davis Jr.	3:24
9.	"When I'm Not Near the Girl I Love"	Sinatra	3:25
10.	"When the Idle Poor Become the Idle Rich"	Lou Monte, Mary Kaye Trio	2:37
11.	"The Begat"	The McGuire Sisters	3:40
12.	"How Are Things in Glocca Morra?" (reprise)	Clark Dennis	2:24
13.	"The Great Come-And-Get It Day"	Davis	2:41
Total length:			38:36

All tracks are written by Cole Porter.

Disc two – Kiss Me, Kate
No.	Title	Singer(s)	Length
1.	"Overture"	̶	3:40
2.	"Another Op'nin', Another Show"	Hi-Lo's	1:55
3.	"Why Can't You Behave?"	Jo Stafford	3:01
4.	"We Open in Venice"	Sinatra, Martin, Davis	2:13
5.	"So in Love"	Johnny Prophet	2:52
6.	"I Hate Men"	Phyllis McGuire	3:06
7.	"Too Darn Hot"	Davis	2:29
8.	"Were Thine That Special Face"	Prophet	3:35
9.	"Where Is the Life That Late I Led?"	Monte	2:56
10.	"Wunderbar"	Dinah Shore, Prophet	2:58
11.	"Always True to You in My Fashion"	Keely Smith	3:38
12.	"Bianca"	Martin	2:47
13.	"So in Love" (reprise)	Sinatra, Smith	2:53
Total length:			38:03

All lyrics are written by Oscar Hammerstein II; all music is composed by Richard Rodgers.

Disc three – South Pacific
No.	Title	Singer(s)	Length
1.	"Overture"	̶	3:57
2.	"Dites-Moi"	McGuire Sisters	1:55
3.	"A Cockeyed Optimist"	Stafford	3:12
4.	"Twin Soliloquies"	Sinatra, Smith	1:38
5.	"Some Enchanted Evening"	Sinatra	3:29
6.	"(I'm in Love with) a Wonderful Guy"	Smith	3:29
7.	"Younger Than Springtime"	Crosby	2:38
8.	"Bali Ha'i"	Stafford	3:43
9.	"There Is Nothing Like a Dame"	Davis	2:37
10.	"I'm Gonna Wash That Man Right Outa My Hair"	Shore	2:38
11.	"Bloody Mary"	Hi-Lo's	1:56
12.	"Happy Talk"	Reynolds	3:05
13.	"Younger Than Springtime"	Hi-Lo's	3:14
14.	"This Nearly Was Mine"	Sinatra	2:47
15.	"Honey Bun"	Shore	2:55
16.	"You've Got to Be Carefully Taught"	Davis	1:45
17.	"Some Enchanted Evening" (reprise)	Sinatra, Clooney	3:21
Total length:			48:19

All tracks are written by Frank Loesser.

Disc four – Guys and Dolls
No.	Title	Singer(s)	Length
1.	"Overture"	̶	3:34
2.	"Fugue for Tinhorns"	Sinatra, Crosby, Martin	1:31
3.	"I'll Know"	Stafford	3:31
4.	"The Oldest Established (Permanent Floating Crap Game in New York)"	Sinatra, Crosby, Martin	2:33
5.	"A Bushel and a Peck"	McGuire Sisters	2:31
6.	"Guys and Dolls"	Sinatra, Martin	2:50
7.	"If I Were a Bell"	Shore	2:40
8.	"I've Never Been in Love Before"	Sinatra	2:57
9.	"Take Back Your Mink"	Reynolds	2:58
10.	"More I Cannot Wish You"	Clark Dennis	3:18
11.	"Adelaide's Lament"	Reynolds	3:52
12.	"Luck Be a Lady"	Sinatra	5:18
13.	"Sue Me"	Reynolds, Allan Sherman	2:32
14.	"Sit Down, You're Rockin' the Boat"	Davis	3:33
15.	"Guys and Dolls" (reprise)	Sinatra, Martin	1:51
Total length:			45:29

== Personnel ==
- Frank Sinatra – vocals
- Dean Martin – vocals
- Sammy Davis Jr. – vocals
- Bing Crosby – vocals
- Debbie Reynolds – vocals
- Rosemary Clooney – vocals
- Jo Stafford – vocals
- Keely Smith – vocals
- Dinah Shore – vocals
- The McGuire Sisters – vocals
- The Hi-Lo's – vocals
- Allan Sherman – vocals
- Nelson Riddle – arranger
- Marty Paich – arranger
- Skip Martin – arranger
- Billy May – arranger
- Morris Stoloff – conductor
