= Sinatra 80th: All the Best =

Compilation album by Frank Sinatra
- Released: November 14, 1995
- Recorded: 1953–1960
- Genres: Traditional pop; vocal jazz
- Label: Capitol

Frank Sinatra chronology
Sinatra 80th: Live in Concert (1995)	Sinatra 80th: All the Best (1995)	The Complete Reprise Studio Recordings (1995)

Sinatra 80th: All the Best is a double compilation disc album by Frank Sinatra. On the final track, "The Christmas Song" is recorded both by Sinatra and Nat King Cole. The title, like the previous album, was released and named to coincide with Frank Sinatra's birthday, as he was celebrating his 80th at the time.

== Track listing ==
=== Disc one ===
1. "Lean Baby" (Roy Alfred, Billy May) – 2:34
2. "I'm Walking Behind You" (Billy Reid) – 2:57
3. "I've Got the World on a String" (Harold Arlen, Ted Koehler) – 2:11
4. "From Here to Eternity" (Freddy Karger, Robert Wells) – 2:59
5. "South of the Border" (Jimmy Kennedy, Michael Carr) – 2:48
6. "Young at Heart" (Carolyn Leigh, Johnny Richards) – 2:51
7. "Three Coins in the Fountain" (Jule Styne, Sammy Cahn) – 3:05
8. "Come Fly with Me (Cahn, Jimmy Van Heusen) – 3:18
9. "Someone to Watch Over Me" (George Gershwin, Ira Gershwin) – 2:56
10. "Melody of Love" (Hans Engelmann, Tom Glazer) – 3:05
11. "Night and Day" (Cole Porter) – 3:59
12. "Learnin' the Blues" (Dolores Silvers) – 3:01
13. "Same Old Saturday Night" (Frank Reardon, Cahn) – 2:29
14. "Love and Marriage" (Cahn, Van Heusen) – 2:38
15. "The Impatient Years" (Cahn, Van Heusen) – 3:16
16. "(Love Is) The Tender Trap" (Cahn, Van Heusen) – 2:57
17. "(How Little It Matters) How Little We Know" (Philip Springer, Leigh) – 2:39
18. "Wait for Me (Theme from Johnny Concho)" (Nelson Riddle, Jo Stafford) – 2:51
19. "The Lady Is a Tramp" (Richard Rodgers, Lorenz Hart) – 3:15
20. "Well, Did You Evah!" (with Bing Crosby) – (Porter) – 3:49

=== Disc two ===
1. "Hey! Jealous Lover" (Sammy Cahn, Kay Twomey, Bee Walker) – 2:22
2. "I've Got You Under My Skin" (Porter) – 3:42
3. "All the Way" (Cahn, Van Heusen) – 2:51
4. "Chicago" (Fred Fisher) – 2:12
5. "Witchcraft" (Cy Coleman, Leigh) – 2:53
6. "How Are Ya' Fixed for Love?" (with Keely Smith) (Cahn, Van Heusen) – 2:25
7. "No One Ever Tells You" (Hub Atwood, Carroll Coates) – 3:24
8. "Time After Time" (Styne, Cahn) – 3:27
9. "In the Wee Small Hours of the Morning" (Bob Hilliard, David Mann) – 2:59
10. "You Make Me Feel So Young" (Josef Myrow, Mack Gordon) – 2:55
11. "I Get a Kick Out of You" (Porter) – 2:54
12. "All My Tomorrows" (Cahn, Van Heusen) – 3:15
13. "High Hopes" (Cahn, Van Heusen) – 2:42
14. "What Is This Thing Called Love?" (Porter) – 2:32
15. "The Moon Was Yellow (And the Night Was Young)" (Fred E. Ahlert, Edgar Leslie) – 3:00
16. "I Love Paris" (Porter) – 1:51
17. "Blues in the Night" (Arlen, Johnny Mercer) – 4:43
18. "Guess I'll Hang My Tears Out to Dry" (Styne, Cahn) – 3:58
19. "Nice 'N' Easy" (Alan and Marilyn Bergman, Lew Spence) – 2:45
20. "The Christmas Song" (with Nat King Cole) (Mel Tormé, Wells) – 3:13

== Charts ==
Chart (1995–1997)	Peak position
Dutch Albums (Album Top 100)	72
UK Albums (Official Charts)	49
US Billboard 200	66

== Certifications ==
Region	Certification	Certified units/sales
United Kingdom (BPI)	Silver	60,000^{*}
^{*} Sales figures based on certification alone.

== Personnel ==
- Frank Sinatra – vocals
- Keely Smith
- Bing Crosby
- Nat King Cole
- Nelson Riddle – arranger, conductor
- Gordon Jenkins
- Billy May
