= Frank Sinatra Sings the Select Cole Porter =

1965 compilation album by Frank Sinatra

Compilation album by Frank Sinatra
- Released: 1965
- Recorded: 1953–1960
- Genres: Traditional pop; vocal jazz
- Length: 39:57
- Label: Capitol

Frank Sinatra chronology
Everything Happens to Me (1965)	Frank Sinatra Sings the Select Cole Porter (1965)	Screen Sinatra (1965)

Frank Sinatra Sings the Select Cole Porter is an album released in 1965 by American singer Frank Sinatra. It comprises his renditions of Cole Porter songs. An abridged version was issued by Capitol/Pickwick as SPC-3463 in 1969.

== Track listing ==
All songs written by Cole Porter.

1. "I've Got You Under My Skin" - 3:43
2. "I Concentrate on You" - 2:23
3. "What Is This Thing Called Love?" - 2:35
4. "You Do Something to Me" - 1:33
5. "At Long Last Love" - 2:23
6. "Anything Goes" - 2:43
7. "Night and Day" - 3:58
8. "Just One of Those Things" - 3:14
9. "I Get a Kick Out of You" - 2:56
10. "You'd Be So Nice to Come Home To" - 2:07
11. "I Love Paris" - 1:49
12. "From This Moment On" - 3:50

1991 CD Bonus Tracks

1. "C'est Magnifique" - 2:01
2. "It's All Right With Me" - 4:16
3. "Mind if I Make Love to You?" - 2:17
4. "You're Sensational" - 3:09

== Personnel ==
- Frank Sinatra - vocals
- Nelson Riddle - arranger, conductor
