= Duets (Frank Sinatra album) =

Studio album by Frank Sinatra
- Released: November 2, 1993
- Recorded: 1992 – 1993
- Studio: Capitol, Los Angeles
- Genre: Traditional pop
- Length: 45:44
- Label: Capitol
- Producer: Phil Ramone, Hank Cattaneo

Frank Sinatra chronology
L.A. Is My Lady (1984)	Duets (1993)	Duets II (1994)

Professional ratings
Review scores
Source	Rating
AllMusic	2/5 stars
Music Week	4/5 stars
The Village Voice	C

Duets is an album by American singer Frank Sinatra, released in 1993. Recorded near the end of Sinatra's career, it consists of electronically assembled duets between Sinatra and younger singers from various genres. The album was a commercial success, debuting at No. 2 on the Billboard albums chart, reaching No. 5 in the UK, and selling over 3 million copies in the US. It is the only Sinatra album to date to achieve triple platinum certification.

The album received mixed reviews from critics, with complaints stemming from Sinatra's specified style of isolated performance wherein he was never joined by his duet partners in the studio, an artificial method of record production which lacked the elements of personal collaboration and spontaneity. The guest singers had been directed to sing along to his pre-recorded vocal parts, and to make their performances complement his. "I've Got a Crush on You" was nominated for the Academy Award for Best instrumental arrangement with accompanying vocals at the 37th Annual Grammy Awards.

The cover art displays a specially commissioned painting of Frank Sinatra by LeRoy Neiman. Its sequel, Duets II, was released the following year. Both albums were packaged together in a "90th Birthday Limited Collector's Edition" released in 2005; North American pressings added an unreleased duet recording of "My Way" with Willie Nelson, while international pressings have him singing with Luciano Pavarotti.

== Production ==
Sinatra was approached in 1992 with the idea of making an album of duets. Phil Ramone, Sinatra's manager Eliot Weisman and the Capitol executive producer Don Rubin discussed the details at Sinatra's house in Palm Springs, California. Ramone felt that Sinatra's classic songs would be brought to new, younger listeners by way of the Duets project.

For duet partners, Sinatra suggested Ella Fitzgerald but she was not well enough to participate. Other artists, younger than Sinatra, were put on the list of potential partners. Sinatra specified that the duet partners must not be in the studio when he was singing his part.

The project was pushed forward by Charles Koppelman, the CEO of EMI Records Group North America. An orchestra was rehearsed at Capitol Studio A in Los Angeles, where Sinatra had recorded many times, the orchestra using classic Nelson Riddle arrangements. Sinatra showed up for the first two days of intended tracking sessions but begged off laying down any vocals the first day because he did not like being isolated in a vocal booth as intended by recording engineer Al Schmitt. On the second day, Hank Cattaneo (co-producer), suggested to Ramone, Schmitt and Pat Williams, that they create a small elevated stage set-up for Sinatra to stand on, and to place Bill Miller and his piano adjacent to Frank within the open-air stage/booth to make the recording session feel more like a live performance. However, Sinatra said his voice was not in optimal condition. At this point, about $350,000 had been spent to put the project together. Ramone and Capitol were worried the record would never be completed. Ramone spoke to Hank Cattaneo, his co-producer, about his concern. It was suggested that since Cattaneo was Frank's production manager and close friend, that he stay near Frank to assist in the sequence of songs and detail to Frank when the takes were acceptable and a retake was not required. Cattaneo further suggested to Ramone and Schmitt that they record with the wireless microphones that Frank was accustomed to using in live performances. Nine songs were recorded in five hours, beginning with "Come Fly with Me". Capitol Records A&R chief Don Rubin was in attendance at the recording session.

The various duet partners were invited to participate remotely, their recordings sent to Capitol by way of ISDN digital telephone lines connected by EDnet to the digital recording equipment. Bono and Aretha Franklin asked that Ramone fly out to appear in person at their local studios to strengthen the connection to Sinatra and the project. Bono recorded his part to "I've Got You Under My Skin" while standing on a couch in the STS Studios control room in Dublin, singing into a handheld microphone. After Franklin recorded her part to "What Now My Love" in Detroit, she recorded a personal message to Sinatra, thanking him for the opportunity. The duet of “My Way” with Luciano Pavarotti was not recorded in time to make the primary release of Sinatra's Duets. It was placed on the Sinatra 80 album and then added to subsequent pressings of Duets as a bonus track addition. Hank Cattaneo produced and recorded this segment in Pavarotti's summer villa in Pesaro, Italy.

== Release ==
The album was advertised as "The Recording Event of The Decade".

Some observers were not satisfied with its recording process.

=== Deluxe Edition ===
Duets: 20th Anniversary Deluxe Edition

Duets: 20th Anniversary Deluxe Edition is a 2013 box set compilation album of electronically assembled duets by American singer Frank Sinatra. Released to commemorate the 20th anniversary of Sinatra's highly successful album Duets, Capitol/UMe released a newly remastered two-CD deluxe edition bringing together the original Duets, and the 1994 follow-up Duets II. In addition to the original duets, the new release includes two previously unreleased recordings, "One for My Baby (And One More for the Road)" featuring Tom Scott and "Embraceable You" with Tanya Tucker, plus bonus tracks "Fly Me to the Moon" with George Strait and two versions of "My Way", one recorded with Luciano Pavarotti and the other with Willie Nelson. The album also features new cover art as well as a 32-page booklet with rare photos and both the original and new liner notes.

== Track listing ==
Unless otherwise indicated, Information is based on Liner notes

No.	Title	Writer(s)	Duet with	Length
1.	"The Lady Is a Tramp" (Arranged by Billy Byers)	Richard Rodgers (music), Lorenz Hart (lyrics)	Luther Vandross	3:24
2.	"What Now My Love" (Arranged by Don Costa)	Gilbert Bécaud (music), Carl Sigman (English lyrics), Pierre Delanoë (French lyrics)	Aretha Franklin	3:15
3.	"I've Got a Crush on You" (Arranged by Patrick Williams)	George Gershwin (music), Ira Gershwin (lyrics)	Barbra Streisand	3:23
4.	"Summer Wind" (Arranged by Nelson Riddle)	Hans Bradtke (German lyrics), Johnny Mercer (English lyrics), Heinz Meier (music)	Julio Iglesias	2:32
5.	"Come Rain or Come Shine" (Arranged by Don Costa)	Harold Arlen (music), Johnny Mercer (lyrics)	Gloria Estefan	4:04
6.	"New York, New York" (Arranged by Don Costa)	Fred Ebb (lyrics), John Kander (music)	Tony Bennett	3:30
7.	"They Can't Take That Away From Me" (Arranged by Patrick Williams)	George Gershwin (music), Ira Gershwin (lyrics)	Natalie Cole	3:11
8.	"You Make Me Feel So Young" (Arranged by Quincy Jones)	Mack Gordon (lyrics), Josef Myrow (music)	Charles Aznavour	3:05
9.	"Guess I'll Hang My Tears Out to Dry" / "In the Wee Small Hours of the Morning" (Arranged by Nelson Riddle)	Sammy Cahn (lyrics), Jule Styne (music) / Bob Hilliard (lyrics), David Mann (music)	Carly Simon	3:57
10.	"I've Got the World on a String" (Arranged by Nelson Riddle)	Harold Arlen (music), Ted Koehler (lyrics)	Liza Minnelli	2:18
11.	"Witchcraft" (Arranged by Nelson Riddle)	Carolyn Leigh (lyrics), Cy Coleman (music)	Anita Baker	3:22
12.	"I've Got You Under My Skin" (Arranged by Nelson Riddle)	Cole Porter	Bono	3:32
13.	"All the Way" / "One For My Baby (And One More For The Road)" (Arranged by Patrick Williams and Nelson Riddle)	Sammy Cahn (lyrics), James Van Heusen (music) / Harold Arlen (music), Johnny Mercer (lyrics)	Kenny G	6:03

Notes

- Intros to "What Now My Love" and "Witchcraft" arranged by Patrick Williams.
- ”What Now My Love" arranged by Don Costa in 1965 for Steve Lawrence’s album The Steve Lawrence Show
- "I've Got a Crush on You" originally arranged by Nelson Riddle in 1960.
- "Summer Wind" arranged by Nelson Riddle in 1966.
- "Come Rain or Come Shine" arranged by Don Costa in 1961.
- "(Theme from) New York, New York" arranged by Don Costa in 1979.
- "They Can't Take That Away From Me" originally arranged by Neal Hefti in 1962.
- ”Guess I’ll Hang My Tears Out to Dry” arranged by Nelson Riddle in 1958.
- ”In the Wee Small Hours of the Morning” arranged by Nelson Riddle in 1955.
- ”I've Got The World on a String" arranged by Nelson Riddle in 1953.
- ”Witchcraft” arranged by Nelson Riddle in 1957.
- ”I've Got You Under My Skin" arranged by Nelson Riddle in 1956.
- ”All The Way” originally arranged by Nelson Riddle in 1956 for “The Joker is Wild” film soundtrack.
- ”One for My Baby (and One More for the Road)” arranged by Nelson Riddle in 1958.

For the deluxe edition:
Disc one:

1. "The Lady Is a Tramp" (Richard Rodgers, Lorenz Hart) (with Luther Vandross) - 3:24
2. "What Now My Love" (Gilbert Becaud, Carl Sigman, Pierre Leroyer) (with Aretha Franklin) - 3:15
3. "I've Got a Crush on You" (George Gershwin, Ira Gershwin) (with Barbra Streisand) - 3:23
4. "Summer Wind" (Heinz Meier, Hans Bradtke, Johnny Mercer) (with Julio Iglesias) - 2:32
5. "Come Rain or Come Shine" (Harold Arlen, Mercer) (with Gloria Estefan) - 4:04
6. "New York, New York" (Fred Ebb, John Kander) (with Tony Bennett) - 3:30
7. "They Can't Take That Away from Me" (G. Gershwin, I. Gershwin) (with Natalie Cole) - 3:11
8. "You Make Me Feel So Young" (Mack Gordon, Josef Myrow) (with Charles Aznavour) - 3:05
9. "Guess I'll Hang My Tears Out to Dry"/"In the Wee Small Hours of the Morning" (Sammy Cahn, Jule Styne)/(Bob Hilliard, David Mann) (with Carly Simon) - 3:57
10. "I've Got the World on a String" (Arlen, Ted Koehler) (with Liza Minnelli) - 2:18
11. "Witchcraft" (Cy Coleman, Carolyn Leigh) (with Anita Baker) - 3:22
12. "I've Got You Under My Skin" (Cole Porter) (with Bono) - 3:32
13. "All the Way"/"One for My Baby (and One More for the Road)" (Cahn, Jimmy Van Heusen)/(Arlen, Mercer) (with Kenny G) - 6:03
14. "My Way" [Previously unreleased] (Paul Anka, Claude Francois, Jacques Revaux, Gilles Thibault) (with Luciano Pavarotti) - 3:33
15. "One For My Baby (And One More For The Road)" [Previously unreleased] (with Tom Scott)

Disc two:

1. "For Once in My Life" (Ron Miller, Orlando Murden) (with Gladys Knight and Stevie Wonder) - 3:18
2. "Come Fly with Me" (Cahn, Van Heusen) (with Luis Miguel) - 4:17
3. "Bewitched, Bothered and Bewildered" (Rodgers, Hart) (with Patti LaBelle) - 3:31
4. "The Best is Yet to Come" (Coleman, Leigh) (with Jon Secada) - 3:12
5. "Moonlight in Vermont" (John Blackburn, Karl Suessdorf) (with Linda Ronstadt) - 4:07
6. "Fly Me to the Moon" (Bart Howard) (with Antonio Carlos Jobim) - 3:06
7. "Luck Be a Lady" (Frank Loesser) (with Chrissie Hynde) - 5:17
8. "A Foggy Day" (G. Gershwin, I. Gershwin) (with Willie Nelson) - 2:24
9. "Where or When" (Rodgers, Hart) (with Steve Lawrence and Eydie Gorme) - 3:53
10. "Embraceable You" (G. Gershwin, I. Gershwin) (with Lena Horne) - 3:45
11. "Mack the Knife" (Marc Blitzstein, Bertolt Brecht, Kurt Weill) (with Jimmy Buffett) - 4:26
12. "How Do You Keep the Music Playing?"/"My Funny Valentine" (Alan Bergman, Marilyn Bergman, Michel Legrand)/(Rodgers, Hart) (with Lorrie Morgan) - 3:58
13. "My Kind of Town" (Cahn, Van Heusen) (with Frank Sinatra, Jr.) - 2:33
14. "The House I Live In" (Lewis Allan, Earl Robinson) (with Neil Diamond) - 4:14
15. "My Way" [bonus track] (with Willie Nelson) - 4:22
16. "Embraceable You" [previously unreleased] (with Tanya Tucker)
17. "Fly Me to the Moon" [previously unreleased] (with George Strait)

Disc three (DVD):

1. Sinatra: Duets (Electronic Press Kit, 1993)
2. I've Got You Under My Skin -duet with Bono (Music Video)
3. Bonus Interviews

== Personnel ==
Musicians

- Duet partners - vocals (1–12), saxophone (13)
- Frank Sinatra - vocals (all tracks)
- Ron Anthony - guitar (1–2, 4–13)
- Chuck Berghofer - rhythm bass (1–2, 4–13)
- Gregg Field - drums (1–2, 4–13)
- Jeff Hamilton - drums (3)
- Michael Melvoin - piano, additional keyboards (3)
- Bill Miller - piano (all tracks)
- Charles Pollard - keyboards, additional music performer (2–4, 6, 8)
- Dave Stone - double bass (3)
- Paul Viapiano - guitar (3)

Production

- Andre Fischer - producer (7)
- David Foster - producer (3)
- Albert Hammond - producer (4)
- Ted Jensen - mastering engineer
- Charles Koppelman - executive producer
- Jay Landers - producer (3)
- Tommy LiPuma - producer (Anita Baker's vocals on 11)
- Phil Ramone - producer (1–10, 12–13, music on 11, Frank Sinatra's vocals on 11)
- Hank Cattaneo - co-producer
- Don Rubin - executive producer
- Al Schmitt - recording engineer
- Roy Hendrickson - recording engineer
- Eliot Weisman - executive producer
- Patrick Williams - musical director, conductor
- John Wheeler - EDnet network engineer

== Charts ==
=== Weekly charts ===
Initial chart performance for Duets
Chart (1993–1994)	Peak position
Australian Albums (ARIA)	2
Austrian Albums (Ö3 Austria)	8
Dutch Albums (Album Top 100)	13
European Albums (European Top 100 Albums)	5
German Albums (Offizielle Top 100)	41
New Zealand Albums (RMNZ)	3
Swedish Albums (Sverigetopplistan)	7
Swiss Albums (Schweizer Hitparade)	21
UK Albums (Official Charts)	5
US Billboard 200	2
US Top Jazz Albums (Billboard)	1

2013–2015 chart performance for Duets
Chart (2013–2015)	Peak position
Belgian Albums (Ultratop Flanders)	130
Spanish Albums (Promusicae)	49

=== Year-end charts ===
1993 year-end chart performance for Duets
Chart (1993)	Position
Australian Albums (ARIA)	16
European Albums (European Top 100 Albums)	93
Spanish Albums (AFYVE)	19

1994 year-end chart performance for Duets
Chart (1994)	Position
Australian Albums (ARIA)	53

== Certifications and sales ==
Certifications and sales for Duets
Region	Certification	Certified units/sales
Argentina (CAPIF)	Platinum	60,000^{^}
Australia (ARIA)	2× Platinum	140,000^{^}
Austria (IFPI Austria)	Gold	25,000^{*}
Brazil	—	250,000
Canada (Music Canada)	2× Platinum	200,000^{^}
Ireland (IRMA)	Gold	7,500^{^}
New Zealand (RMNZ)	Platinum	15,000^{^}
Spain (Promusicae)	Platinum	100,000^{^}
Sweden (GLF)	Gold	50,000^{^}
United Kingdom (BPI)	Platinum	300,000^{^}
United States (RIAA)	3× Platinum	3,000,000^{^}
Summaries
Worldwide	—	5,000,000
^{*} Sales figures based on certification alone.^{^} Shipments figures based on certification alone.

== Television special ==
On 25 November 1994, Sinatra recorded a television special which aired on CBS, titled Sinatra: Duets. This was intended to promote both the album Duets as well as its successor, Sinatra's last studio recording, Duets II.

== Reception ==
Joe Marchese said, "The Duets: Twentieth Anniversary box is lavishly packaged in classy style befitting the artist...Where this handsomely-designed package truly disappoints is the paucity of rare, desirable bonus material."
