= Return to Paradise Islands =

Studio album by Bing Crosby
- Released: 1964
- Recorded: 1963
- Genre: Vocal pop
- Length: 38:53
- Label: Reprise

Bing Crosby chronology
| Reprise Musical Repertory Theatre (set of 4 albums, including 3 albums featuring Crosby) (1963) | Return to Paradise Islands (1964) | America, I Hear You Singing (w/ Frank Sinatra and Fred Waring) (1964) |

Return to Paradise Islands is the thirty-second solo studio album by American singer and actor Bing Crosby for Reprise Records (R-6106) at three separate sessions (August 21, October 16, and December 9) in 1963. The tracks were arranged by Nelson Riddle who also conducted the orchestra.

The album was re-released on CD by Collectors' Choice Music (CCM 2105) in 2010 after being remixed from the original three track master tapes by Robert S. Bader of Bing Crosby Enterprises.

== Reception ==
Billboard reviewed the album saying "Bing turns on the charm again. This 1964 version of Der Bingle is calm, relaxed and very much in tune with this South Seas material. The tunes, for the most part, are out of the usual standard fare. Nelson Riddle’s backings are fruitful and are certainly enough to make the old master and his vocal backings sway in the breeze. “Adventures in Paradise” is a fine middle of the road programming track."

In the UK, the Gramophone liked it. "Bing Crosby seems to be holding back deliberately in his collection of Hawaiian-tinged songs on Reprise R6106, for he projects without any effort at all, just as he has always done during the last thirty-eight years."

Also in the UK, the New Musical Express was even more enthusiastic commenting: "A four star album...With a luxury orchestral backing from Nelson Riddle, the “Old Groaner” shows he is indeed the Peter Pan of recordland. Here he warbles, relaxed and deep throated as ever, a dozen Hawaiian songs. And Bing is one singer you can hear when a vocal group is accompanying. Well done Bing."

== Track listing ==
Side one
| No. | Title | Writer(s) | Length |
|---|---|---|---|
| 1. | "Return to Paradise" | Dimitri Tiomkin, Ned Washington | 3:21 |
| 2. | "The Hukilau Song" | Jack Owens | 2:16 |
| 3. | "The Old Plantation" | David Nape, Mary Montano, J. R. Shannon | 3:48 |
| 4. | "Lovely Hula Hands" | R. Alex Anderson | 2:56 |
| 5. | "Love and Aloha" | Johnny Blaisdell | 3:19 |
| 6. | "Keep Your Eyes on the Hands" | Tony Todaro, Mary Johnston | 2:46 |

Side two
| No. | Title | Writer(s) | Length |
|---|---|---|---|
| 1. | "Adventures in Paradise" | Lionel Newman, Dorcas Cochran | 3:18 |
| 2. | "Frangipani Blossom" | Jay Livingston, Ray Evans | 2:51 |
| 3. | "Forevermore" | Charles E. King, Milt Raskin | 3:25 |
| 4. | "Farewell My Tane" | August Goupil, Richard Gump, Johnny Noble | 3:59 |
| 5. | "Beautiful Kahana" | Mary Montano, Charles E. King | 3:45 |
| 6. | "Home in Hawaii (King's Serenade)" | Charles E. King, Paul Francis Webster | 3:09 |
