= Screen Sinatra =

Compilation album by Frank Sinatra
- Released: 1980
- Recorded: 1953–1960
- Genre: Traditional pop
- Length: 53:10
- Label: EMI, Capitol

Frank Sinatra chronology
Frank Sinatra Sings the Select Cole Porter (1996)	Screen Sinatra (1980)	Frank Sinatra Sings the Select Sammy Cahn (1996)

Screen Sinatra is an album featuring songs by Frank Sinatra from various movies to which he contributed. The tracks were recorded between 1953 and 1960, though the final track—"Dream", recorded in 1960—comes from the 1971 film Carnal Knowledge. The compilation was released in 1980 on LP and cassette by EMI, on CD in 1989 by EMI and was released in the United States by Capitol Records in 1996.

== Track listing ==
1. "From Here to Eternity" (Freddie Karger, Robert Wells) (from From Here to Eternity) – 3:01
2. "Three Coins in the Fountain" (Jule Styne, Sammy Cahn) (from Three Coins in the Fountain) – 3:07
3. "Young at Heart" (Johnny Richards, Carolyn Leigh) (from Young at Heart) – 2:54
4. "Just One of Those Things" (Cole Porter) (from Young at Heart) – 3:14
5. "Someone to Watch Over Me" (George Gershwin, Ira Gershwin) (from Young at Heart) – 2:57
6. "Not as a Stranger" (Jimmy Van Heusen, Buddy Kaye) (from Not as a Stranger) – 2:46
7. "(Love Is) The Tender Trap" (Cahn, Van Heusen) (from The Tender Trap) – 3:00
8. "Johnny Concho Theme (Wait For Me)" (Nelson Riddle, Dick Stanford) (from Johnny Concho) – 2:51
9. "All the Way" (Van Heusen, Cahn) (from The Joker Is Wild) – 2:53
10. "Chicago (That Toddlin' Town)" (Fred Fisher) (from The Joker Is Wild) – 2:12
11. "Monique" (Cahn, Elmer Bernstein) (from Kings Go Forth) – 3:18
12. "They Came To Cordura" (Cahn, Van Heusen) (from They Came To Cordura) – 2:54
13. "To Love and Be Loved" (Van Heusen, Cahn) (from Some Came Running) – 2:56
14. "High Hopes" (Van Heusen, Cahn) (from A Hole in the Head) – 2:42
15. "All My Tomorrows" (Van Heusen, Cahn) (from A Hole in the Head) – 3:15
16. "It's All Right with Me" (Porter) (from Can Can) – 4:12
17. "C'est Magnifique" (Porter) (from Can Can) – 2:01
18. "Dream" (Johnny Mercer) (from Daddy Long Legs) – 2:57
