= Roger Rossi =

Roger Rossi (born 1940) is an American pianist, accompanist, vocalist, bandleader, published author and composer born Roger Rossitto, in Brooklyn, New York. He is the son of concert violinist Vincent Rossitto, who graduated from the Royal Conservatory of Bellini in Palermo, Sicily and performed on many of the great stages of Italy including Teatro Massimo.

== Musician ==
Rossi attended Amityville Memorial High School in Amityville, New York and was elected "Class Musician". He first studied piano under Mary Findley Ades of Brightwaters, New York and later under James Ball, Professor of Piano Studies at Crane School of Music in Potsdam, New York.

For years Rossi was piano accompanist and music director for Canadian recording artist Tommy Desmond, and later for Columbia Records artist Gene Stridel. He was on staff for Ultrasonic Recording Studios in New York where he played on several hit recordings including The Shangri-Las No. 1 Billboard hit “Leader of the Pack”.

Throughout his 50-plus years as a musician, he's performed a wide variety of music throughout Canada, New York, and New England. In Florida he was the bandleader in the main dining room of the 5-star Boca Raton Hotel & Club for almost 4 years; and Resident Pianist at St. Paul of the Cross Catholic Church, Singer Island for 15 years.

Roger Rossi is a Past President of Rotary International Club of Wellington, Florida where he received the Spirit of Rotary Award and Paul Harris Fellowship.

== Author ==
In 2000, Roger Rossi authored From The Piano Bench: Memorable Moments With Mobsters, Moguls, Movie Stars and More. The book contains 70 very interesting short stories about his encounters with many famous and notorious people throughout his music career, including: Liberace, John F. Kennedy Jr., Princess Diana, Perry Como, Tony Bennett, Vic Damone, Johnny Mathis, Joe Louis, Rocky Graziano, Rodney Dangerfield, Jack Nicklaus, Itzhak Perlman, Evel Knievel, and Shelley Winters.

== Composer ==
In 2005, Roger Rossi composed his version of Ave Maria after it came to him in a dream. The piece follows the same concept as many other Ave Marias in that it's a Latin translation of the Hail Mary prayer calling for the intercession of Mary, the mother of Jesus. However, Rossi's version differs from most others because it includes additional lyrics to that prayer's text. In a world greatly troubled with wars, terrorism, immorality, greed and selfishness, Rossi felt compelled to ask for divine guidance. His addendum states, “Sancta Maria, beata et casta, ora pro nobis; adiuva nos; egemus tua caritate.” In English it means: “Holy Mary, blessed and pure, pray for us; help us; we need your love.”

In 2007, the Vero Beach Choral Society performed Hawley Ades’ choral arrangement of Rossi's Ave Maria, with Dr. Marcos D. Flores conducting what was billed The World Premiere. In 2008, soprano Melissa Rowell recorded on YouTube Charles Calello's symphonic orchestration of Rossi's Ave Maria. In 2009, internationally acclaimed operatic soprano Susan Neves sang Rossi's Ave Maria with the composer (Rossi) at the piano in a performance presented by the Vero Beach Opera on YouTube.

== Family ==
Married: to Sylvia Ann Lacey a/k/a Sal from 1960 to present
Children: Bonny West, Roger Rossitto, Lisa Vinson
Grandchildren: Bradley West, Jesslee, Katrina Colletti, Camryn West, Andrea Colletti, Tori Auer
