= Frank Sinatra Sings the Select Rodgers & Hart =

Compilation album by Frank Sinatra
- Released: April 4, 1995
- Recorded: 1953–1961
- Genre: Traditional pop; vocal jazz
- Length: 50:33
- Label: Capitol
- Producer: Voyle Gilmore

Frank Sinatra chronology
| Frank Sinatra Sings the Select Johnny Mercer (1995) | Frank Sinatra Sings the Select Rodgers & Hart (1995) | Sinatra 80th: Live in Concert (1995) |

Frank Sinatra Sings the Select Rodgers & Hart is a 1995 compilation album by Frank Sinatra. In this album, Sinatra sings his renditions of Richard Rodgers and Lorenz Hart.

== Track listing ==
- All songs written by Rodgers and Hart.
1. "Lover" (from Love Me Tonight; 1932) – 1:53
2. "Glad to Be Unhappy" (from On Your Toes; 1936) – 2:35
3. "I Didn't Know What Time It Was" (from Too Many Girls; 1939 & Pal Joey; 1957) – 2:47
4. "Where or When" (from Babes In Arms & Babes in Arms; 1937 & 1939) – 2:25
5. "It's Easy to Remember (And So Hard to Forget)" (from Mississippi; 1935) – 3:34
6. "There's a Small Hotel" (from On Your Toes; 1936 & Pal Joey, 1957) – 2:16
7. "Wait till You See Her" (from By Jupiter; 1942) – 3:08
8. "Little Girl Blue" (from Jumbo; 1935) – 2:54
9. "Bewitched, Bothered and Bewildered" (from Pal Joey; 1940 & Pal Joey; 1957) – 3:39
10. "I Wish I Were in Love Again" (from Babes In Arms; 1937) – 2:27
11. "Spring Is Here" (from I Married An Angel & I Married An Angel; 1938 & 1942) – 4:47
12. "The Lady Is a Tramp" (from Babes In Arms, Babes in Arms & Pal Joey; 1937, 1939 & 1957) – 3:14
13. "Dancing on the Ceiling" (from Ever Green; 1930) – 2:57
14. "I Could Write a Book" (from Pal Joey; 1940 & Pal Joey; 1957) – 3:53
15. "Blue Moon" (c. 1934) – 2:51
16. "It Never Entered My Mind" (from Higher and Higher; 1940) – 2:42
17. "My Funny Valentine" (from Babes In Arms & Pal Joey; 1937 & 1957) – 2:31

== Personnel ==
- Frank Sinatra – vocals
- Heinie Beau – arranger (Track 1)
- Billy May – conductor (Track 1)
- Nelson Riddle – arranger (Tracks 2–6, 7, 9, 10, 11, 13, 14, 16 & 12), conductor (Tracks 2, 4, 5, 7, 8, 10-13 & 15–17)
- George Sivaro – arranger (Tracks 8 & 17)
- Morris Stoloff – conductor (Tracks 3, 6, 9 & 14)
- Voyle Gilmore – producer
- John Palladino – audio engineer
