= Sinatra's Sinatra =

Studio album by Frank Sinatra
- Released: August 1963
- Genres: Vocal jazz, traditional pop
- Length: 35:52
- Labels: Reprise; FS 1010
- Producer: Sonny Burke

Frank Sinatra chronology
| The Concert Sinatra (1963) | Sinatra's Sinatra (1963) | Reprise Musical Repertory Theatre (1963) |

Professional ratings
Review scores
| Source | Rating |
|---|---|
| Allmusic | 3/5 stars |
| New Record Mirror | 5/5 stars |

Sinatra's Sinatra is an album by American singer Frank Sinatra, released in 1963.

Ten of the album's twelve tracks are re-recorded versions of songs that Sinatra had previously released, with "Pocketful of Miracles" and "Call Me Irresponsible" being first-time recordings for Sinatra.

Sinatra's two previous record labels, Columbia Records and Capitol Records, had both successfully issued collections of Sinatra's hits; this album was the attempt of his new label, Reprise Records, to duplicate this success by offering some earlier songs in stereophonic sound, which by 1963 was an exploding recording technology.

The album was arranged and conducted by frequent Sinatra collaborator Nelson Riddle.

== Track listing ==
1. "I've Got You Under My Skin" (Cole Porter) – 3:26
2. "In the Wee Small Hours of the Morning" (David Mann, Bob Hilliard) – 2:43
3. "The Second Time Around" (Sammy Cahn, Jimmy Van Heusen) – 3:03
4. "Nancy (With the Laughing Face)" (Phil Silvers, Van Heusen) – 3:37
5. "Witchcraft" (Cy Coleman, Carolyn Leigh) – 2:37
6. "Young at Heart" (Leigh, Johnny Richards) – 2:54
7. "All the Way" (Cahn, Van Heusen) – 3:27
8. "(How Little It Matters) How Little We Know" (Leigh, Phil Springer) – 2:19
9. "Pocketful of Miracles" (Cahn, Van Heusen) – 2:37
10. "Oh! What it Seemed to Be" (Bennie Benjamin, George David Weiss, Frankie Carle) – 3:27
11. "Call Me Irresponsible" (Cahn, Van Heusen) – 3:12
12. "Put Your Dreams Away (For Another Day)" (Paul Mann, Stephan Weiss, Ruth Lowe) – 3:12

== Personnel ==
- Frank Sinatra - vocals
- Nelson Riddle - arranger, conductor

== Certifications ==
| Region | Certification | Certified units/sales |
|---|---|---|
| United States (RIAA) | Gold | 500,000^{^} |
^{^} Shipments figures based on certification alone.
