= Robin and the 7 Hoods (album) =

1964 album by Frank Sinatra and Bing Crosby

Robin and the 7 Hoods: Original Score From The Motion Picture Musical Comedy

Studio album by Frank Sinatra, Bing Crosby, Dean Martin, Sammy Davis Jr. and Peter Falk
- Released: June 1964
- Recorded: April 1964
- Studio: United Western Recorders
- Genres: Traditional pop; jazz
- Length: 39:12
- Labels: Reprise vinyl, Artanis CD
- Producer: Sonny Burke

Frank Sinatra chronology
America, I Hear You Singing (w/ Bing Crosby and Fred Waring) (1964)	Robin and the 7 Hoods: Original Score From The Motion Picture Musical Comedy (1964)	It Might as Well Be Swing (1964)

Bing Crosby chronology
America, I Hear You Singing (w/ Frank Sinatra and Fred Waring (1964)	Robin and the 7 Hoods: Original Score From The Motion Picture Musical Comedy (1964)	12 Songs of Christmas (w/ Frank Sinatra and Fred Waring) (1964)

Dean Martin chronology
Reprise Musical Repertory Theatre (A set of 4 albums, including 3 albums with Dean) (1963)	Robin and the 7 Hoods: Original Score From The Motion Picture Musical Comedy (1964)	Dream with Dean (1964)

Professional ratings
Review scores
Source	Rating
Record Mirror	4/5 stars

Robin and the 7 Hoods is a 1964 12" vinyl LP album originally issued by Reprise as No. F-2021. Wrongly assumed to be a true soundtrack album of the film Robin and the 7 Hoods, it was correctly advertised as being the "original score from the motion picture musical comedy". The film was made in November/December 1963, and the album was subsequently recorded at United Recording, Hollywood, in April 1964. The scene with Frank Sinatra's vocal of "I Like to Lead When I Dance" was dropped, so only the background instrumental can be heard in the film.

On October 24, 2000, Artanis Productions, a movie production and licensing company owned by the estate of Frank Sinatra ("Artanis" is "Sinatra" spelled backwards) issued a CD (ARZ-104-2) of the album with some bonus tracks. In the sleeve notes by Charles Pignone, Frank Sinatra Jr. states that the songs were re-recorded because of the better quality attainable in a recording studio as opposed to the process used for film soundtracks.

== Reception ==
Variety gave the album a favorable reception, saying: "With such topflight funsters as Frank Sinatra, Dean Martin, Bing Crosby and Sammy Davis Jr. to warble the songs, this LP looms as a solid contender at the stores and on the air. All of 'em have at least one good number and the overall feel of the session is upbeat. The Warner filmusical will soon be released and it could be a surprise summer winner. The LP has a fine chance on its own."

== Track listing ==
All tracks are written by Jimmy Van Heusen and Sammy Cahn. All songs arranged and conducted by Nelson Riddle.

Side one
No.	Title	Performed by	Length
1.	"Overture"	̶	6:18
2.	"My Kind of Town"	Frank Sinatra	3:18
3.	"All for One and One for All"	Peter Falk and Chorus	1:34
4.	"Don't Be a Do-Badder"	Bing Crosby and Kids	3:10
5.	"Any Man Who Loves His Mother"	Dean Martin	1:44
6.	"Style"	Frank Sinatra, Dean Martin and Bing Crosby	4:34

Side two
No.	Title	Performed by	Length
1.	"Mister Booze"	Bing Crosby, Sammy Davis Jr., Dean Martin, Frank Sinatra and Chorus	5:21
2.	"I Like to Lead When I Dance"	Frank Sinatra	4:14
3.	"Bang! Bang!"	Sammy Davis Jr.	3:52
4.	"Charlotte Couldn't Charleston"	Chorus	1:48
5.	"Give Praise! Give Praise! Give Praise!"	Chorus	2:59
6.	"Don't Be a Do-Badder (Finale)"	Frank Sinatra, Dean Martin, Sammy Davis Jr. and Bing Crosby	1:22

Bonus tracks on Artanis CD release
No.	Title	Performed by	Length
13.	"Studio chatter"	Frank Sinatra, Dean Martin, Sammy Davis Jr. and Bing Crosby	2:13
14.	"Studio chatter"	Frank Sinatra	0:18
15.	"My Kind of Town" (previously unreleased alternate version)	Frank Sinatra	3:26

== Charts ==
Chart (1964)	Peak position
US Billboard 200	56
