= Hawley Ades =

American choral arranger (1908–2008)

Hawley Ades was an American choral arranger, born in Wichita, Kansas on June 25, 1908. He died March 26, 2008, at the age of 99, three months shy of his 100th birthday. He was the son of two professional musicians; choral director Lucius Ades, and concert pianist and teacher Mary Findley Ades.

Hawley Ades graduated from Rutgers College in 1929. He was hired as a staff arranger for Irving Berlin's publishing company, where from 1932 to 1936 he made hundreds of stock arrangements for the leading dance bands of the day, including special arrangements for Raymond Scott and Paul Whiteman.

In 1937, he was hired as a choral arranger for Fred Waring's very popular group, The Pennsylvanians, and was a mainstay for the next 38 years. Fred Waring often introduced Ades on concert tours by saying that "more people play and sing his arrangements than those of any other arranger in history.”

He became one of the most prolific choral arrangers of the 20th Century. His arrangements - published by Waring's Shawnee Press - are still very popular throughout the US, especially with high school and community choirs.

In 1966, Ades authored the textbook “Choral Arranging” - a standard in the field. He retired from the Waring organization in 1975, but continued to write and analyze music almost to his death.

One of his last known arrangements was for lifelong family friend and professional musician and composer Roger Rossi. Mr. Rossi remembers, “Hawley Ades and I were friends for fifty-five years. We both took piano lessons from his mother, Mary Findley Ades. I’ve had a warm and lasting friendship with his entire family. Naturally, upon completing my Ave Maria, I sent it to Hawley." Rossi went on to say that Ades' quickly replied, "the piece is absolutely beautiful, and I’d like to write an SATB arrangement for it." To that Rossi stated, "I was shocked he’d do that. While still mentally sharp, he was 95 years old, and half blind! He had to use a magnifying aid to see his notes while scoring. Gradually, note-by-note he plodded away until it was done. It was a chore that exemplified the man’s great work ethics, congeniality, and talents all the way through to his later years. He did it for me, and I’m so proud of him. Unfortunately, he never heard his own arrangement. I’m sure he would’ve been thrilled like I was. The world is a better place now, because Hawley Ades was here.”

Hawley Ades nephew, author Tom Moreland, a lawyer in New York City, wrote two printed articles in The Mississippi Rag titled "Hawley Ades: Musical Memories - I and II" (August and September 2008).
