= Here's to the Band =

Single by Frank Sinatra
- A-side: "Here's to the Band"
- B-side: "It's Sunday"
- Released: 1983
- Recorded: January 25, 1983, New York City, New York
- Genre: Swing
- Length: 3:21
- Label: Reprise (US, 45")
- Songwriter(s): Sharman Howe, Alfred Nittoli, Artie Schroeck

Frank Sinatra singles chronology
"Say Hello" (1981)	"Here's to the Band" (1983)	"To Love a Child" (1983)

"Here's to the Band" is a 1983 popular song written by Sharman Howe, Alfred Nittoli, and Artie Schroeck. It was released as a single by Frank Sinatra.

The song was written by three fans of Sinatra's work and arranged by his conductor Joe Parnello. The lyrics are autobiographical, describing his journey from "neighborhood saloons to Carnegie Hall", and praising the musicians that he has worked with over his career.

Several artists went on to cover the song in both live and studio recordings, such as Sammy Davis Jr and Liza Minnelli.
