= In the Cool, Cool, Cool of the Evening =

1951 song by Johnny Mercer and Hoagy Carmichael

Single by Bing Crosby and Jane Wyman with Matty Matlock's All Stars and the Four Hits and a Miss
- B-side: "Misto Cristofo Columbo"
- Released: 1951
- Genre: Pop
- Length: 3:24
- Label: Decca
- Songwriters: Hoagy Carmichael, Johnny Mercer

Bing Crosby singles chronology
"Gone Fishin'" (1951)	"In the Cool, Cool, Cool of the Evening" (1951)	"Isle of Innisfree" (1952)

"In the Cool, Cool, Cool of the Evening" is a popular song with music by Hoagy Carmichael, and lyrics by Johnny Mercer. It was originally planned to feature it in a Paramount Pictures film written for Betty Hutton, that never took off, which was to be called The Mack Sennett Girl, or Keystone Girl. The song was buried in Paramount's files until it was rediscovered and then used in the 1951 film Here Comes the Groom and won the Academy Award for Best Original Song.

The recording by Bing Crosby, and Jane Wyman, with Matty Matlock's All Stars, and the Four Hits and a Miss was recorded on June 20, 1951, and released by Decca Records as catalog number 27678. It first reached the Billboard entertainment trade magazine's "Best Seller" chart on September 21, 1951, and lasted six weeks on the chart, peaking at number 11.

== Other recordings ==
- Dean Martin recorded the song on April 9, 1951, for Capitol Records.
- Harry James released a recording on the album Hollywood's Best (Columbia B-319 and CL-6224) (1952) with Rosemary Clooney on vocals.
- Mavis Rivers included the song on her album The Simple Life (1960)
- Frankie Laine and Jo Stafford recorded the song as a duet in 1951 for Columbia Records.
- Frank Sinatra included the song on his album Sinatra Sings Days of Wine and Roses, Moon River, and Other Academy Award Winners (1964).
- Bing Crosby and Fred Astaire included the song on their album A Couple of Song and Dance Men (1975).
- Crystal Gayle included the song on her album Crystal Gayle Sings the Heart and Soul of Hoagy Carmichael (1999).
- Bette Midler included the song on her album Bette Midler Sings the Rosemary Clooney Songbook (2003).
