= Younger than Springtime =

Song
- Published: 1949
- Genre: Showtune'
- Composer: Richard Rodgers
- Lyricist: Oscar Hammerstein II

"Younger than Springtime" is a show tune from the 1949 Rodgers and Hammerstein musical South Pacific. It has been widely recorded as a jazz standard.

The song is performed in the first act by Lieutenant Cable when he makes love to his adored Liat, to whom he was only recently introduced by her mother Bloody Mary. The song shows that love just happens and does not follow the rules of racial separation prevalent in the United States at that time.

In the original Broadway show, the song was performed by William Tabbert while in the 1958 film, it was sung by John Kerr miming to a vocal by Bill Lee.

== Lyrical Analysis ==
Hammerstein used repetition as a key aspect of the song repeating the words "am I" and "are you" when describing Cable and Liat: "softer than starlight", "gayer than laughter" and "younger than springtime".

== Musical Analysis ==
The song is written in F Major.

== Other notable recordings ==
- 1949 William Tabbert in the Original Broadway Cast album.
- 1949 Dick Haymes - included in the album Imagination
- 1949 Gordon MacRae - Capitol-602
- 1949 Dinah Shore - Columbia – 38460
- 1950 Fred Waring and His Pennsylvanians - Decca 9-24668
- 1952 Billy Eckstine for his album Love Songs By Rodgers And Hammerstein.
- 1954 Rosemary Clooney - recorded May 3, 1954 and included in the album While We're Young.
- 1955 Margaret Whiting for her album Love Songs by Margaret Whiting.
- 1956 Mario Lanza recorded for his album Lanza on B'way.
- 1957 The Andrews Sisters included in the album Fresh and Fancy Free.
- 1958 Bill Lee included in the film soundtrack album.
- 1958 Andy Williams released a version of the song on his album, Andy Williams Sings Rodgers and Hammerstein.
- 1961 Matt Monro included in the album The Rarities Collection.
- 1963 Bing Crosby recorded the song for the South Pacific album in the Reprise Musical Repertory Theatre series.
- 1963 The Hi-Lo's also recorded the song for the South Pacific album in the Reprise Musical Repertory Theatre series.
- 1963 Vic Damone included in his album On the Street Where You Live.
- 1965 Ken Dodd for his album Tears of Happiness.
- 1966 John Gary recorded for his album Choice.
- 1967 Frank Sinatra recorded September 20, 1967 and included in the album Movin' with Nancy.
- 1986 Mandy Patinkin included in the studio album South Pacific.
- 1991 Plácido Domingo for his album The Broadway I Love.
- 1996 Bryn Terfel - recorded for the album Something Wonderful: Bryn Terfel Sings Rodgers & Hammerstein.
- 1999 Judy Collins included in her album Classic Broadway.
- 2022 It appears rather ironically in a scene in My Old School.
