= Duets II (Frank Sinatra album) =

Studio album by Frank Sinatra
- Released: November 15, 1994
- Recorded: July 1, 6, 9, October 12, 14, 1993
- Genre: Traditional pop
- Length: 52:01
- Label: Capitol
- Producer: Phil Ramone

Frank Sinatra chronology
Duets (1993)	Duets II (1994)	Frank Sinatra Sings the Select Johnny Mercer (1995)

Professional ratings
Review scores
Source	Rating
AllMusic	2/5 stars
Music Week	4/5 stars
NME	3/10

Duets II is an album by American singer Frank Sinatra. It was released in 1994 and was the sequel to the previous year's Duets. Phil Ramone and Hank Cattaneo produced the album and guest artists from various genres contributed their duet parts to Sinatra's already recorded vocals. Though not as commercially successful as Duets, it still rose to number 9 on the Billboard albums chart and sold over 1 million copies in the U.S. It also peaked at number 29 in the UK.

The album received mixed reviews from critics, although some viewed it as an improvement over its predecessor. However, the album won Sinatra the 1995 Grammy Award for Best Traditional Pop Vocal Performance, his last competitive Grammy Award.

These would be the last studio recordings made by Sinatra, who had begun his recording career fifty-four years earlier. Both were packaged together in a "90th Birthday Limited Collector's Edition" released in 2005; North American pressings add an unreleased duet recording of "My Way" with Willie Nelson, while international pressings have him singing with Luciano Pavarotti.

== Track listing ==
Unless otherwise indicated, information is based on the liner notes.

No.	Title	Writer(s)	Duet with	Length
1.	"For Once in My Life"	Ronald Miller (Lyrics), Orlando Murden (Music)	Gladys Knight and Stevie Wonder	3:18
2.	"Come Fly with Me"	Sammy Cahn (Lyrics), James Van Heusen (Music)	Luis Miguel	4:17
3.	"Bewitched, Bothered and Bewildered"	Richard Rodgers (Music), Lorenz Hart (Lyrics)	Patti LaBelle	3:31
4.	"The Best Is Yet to Come"	Cy Coleman (Music), Carolyn Leigh (Lyrics)	Jon Secada	3:12
5.	"Moonlight in Vermont"	John Blackburn (Lyrics), Karl Suessdorf (Music)	Linda Ronstadt	4:07
6.	"Fly Me to the Moon"	Bart Howard	Antônio Carlos Jobim	3:06
7.	"Luck Be a Lady"	Frank Loesser	Chrissie Hynde	5:17
8.	"A Foggy Day (In London Town)"	George Gershwin (Music), Ira Gershwin (Lyrics)	Willie Nelson	2:24
9.	"Where or When"	Rodgers (Music), Hart (Lyrics)	Steve Lawrence and Eydie Gormé	3:53
10.	"Embraceable You"	G. Gershwin (Music), I. Gershwin (Lyrics)	Lena Horne	3:45
11.	"Mack the Knife"	Marc Blitzstein (English Lyrics), Bert Brecht (German Lyrics), Kurt Weill (Music)	Jimmy Buffett	4:26
12.	"How Do You Keep the Music Playing?" / "My Funny Valentine"	Alan Bergman (Lyrics), Marilyn Bergman (Lyrics), Michel Legrand (Music) / Rodgers (Music), Hart (Lyrics)	Lorrie Morgan	3:58
13.	"My Kind of Town"	Cahn (Lyrics), Van Heusen (Music)	Frank Sinatra Jr.	2:33
14.	"The House I Live In"	Lewis Allan (Lyrics), Earl Robinson (Music)	Neil Diamond	4:14

Notes

- "For Once in My Life" arranged by Don Costa in 1969.
- "Bewitched, Bothered and Bewildered" originally arranged by Nelson Riddle in 1957 for Pal Joey film soundtrack.
- "Moonlight in Vermont" originally arranged by Billy May in 1957.
- "Embraceable You" arranged by Nelson Riddle in 1960.
- "My Funny Valentine" originally arranged by Nelson Riddle in 1957 for a Seattle, Washington concert.
- "My Kind of Town" arranged by Nelson Riddle in 1963 for Robin and the 7 Hoods film soundtrack.
- "The House I Live In" music arranged by Nelson Riddle in 1964.

== Personnel ==
Information is based on the liner notes.

- Duet Partners – vocals (2–5, 7–14)
- Frank Sinatra Sr. – vocals (1–5, 7–14, lead on 6)
- Antonio Carlos Jobim – lead vocals, intro music performer (6)
- Gladys Knight – vocals (1)
- Stevie Wonder – harmonica, piano, vocal ad-libs (1)
- Ron Anthony – guitar
- Chuck Berghofer – bass, rhythm bass
- Edwin Bonilla – intro music performer (6)
- Ed Calle – intro music performer (6)
- Jorge Casas – intro music performer (6)
- Gregg Field – drums
- Paolo Jobim – intro music performer (6)
- Juanito Marquez – intro music performer (6)
- Bill Miller – piano
- Jorge Noriega – backing vocals (6)
- Clay Ostwald – additional keyboards (9)
- Rita Quintero – backing vocals (6)
- Arturo Sandoval – trumpet solo (7)
- Terry Trotter – piano (9)

Production

- Billy Byers – music arranger (9)
- Hank Cattaneo – producer (1, 3–14, music on 2)
- Kiko Cibrian – vocal producer (2)
- Don Costa – arranger (1, music on 14)
- Frank Foster – arranger (11)
- Tom Hensley – vocal arranger (14)
- Ted Jensen – mastering
- Quincy Jones – arranger (4, 6)
- Charles Koppelman – executive producer
- Alan Lindgren – vocal arranger (14)
- Johnny Mandel – arranger (8)
- Billy May – arranger (2, 7)
- Jose Quintana – vocal producer (2)
- Phil Ramone – producer (1, 3–14, music on 2)
- Nelson Riddle – arranger (10, 13)
- Don Rubin – executive producer
- Eliot Weisman – executive producer
- Dick Williams – vocal arranger (9)
- Patrick Williams – arranger (3, 5–6, 11–12), conductor, musical director
- Bill Zehme – liner notes

Engineers

- John Aquilino, Bernie Becker, Paul Cartledge, Bill Cavanaugh, Mike Couzzi, T-Bone Demman, Charles Dye, Geraldo Fernandes de Souza Jr., Carl Glanville, Larry Greenhill, Don Hahn, R.R. Harlan, Jay Healy, Charles Paakkari, John Patterson, Scott Perry, Csaba Petocz, Ed Rak, Paul McKenna, George Massenburg, Dave Reitzas, Eric Schilling, Al Schmitt, Rick Southern, Ted Stein, Ron Taylor, Larry Walsh, John Wheeler, Frank Wolf, Tom Young

Assistant engineers

- Craig Brock, Scott Canto, Marcelo Anez, Bryan Carrigan, Jim Caruana, Sean Chambers, Peter Doell, Troy Halderson, David Hall, Sebastian Krys, Mike Mazzetti, Francisco Miranda, Jennifer Monnar, Marcelo Moura, Mark Ralston, Kevin Scott, Andy Smith, Chris Wiggins

== Television special ==
On November 25, 1994, Sinatra recorded a television special which aired on CBS, titled Sinatra: Duets. This was intended to promote both his previous album Duets as well as its successor, Duets II.

== Charts ==
Chart (1994)	Peak position
Australian Albums (ARIA)	16
Austrian Albums (Ö3 Austria)	27
Dutch Albums (Album Top 100)	21
Swedish Albums (Sverigetopplistan)	20
US Billboard 200	9

== Certifications ==
Region	Certification	Certified units/sales
Canada (Music Canada)	Platinum	100,000^{^}
New Zealand (RMNZ)	Gold	7,500^{^}
Spain (Promusicae)	Gold	50,000^{^}
United Kingdom (BPI)	Silver	60,000^{*}
United States (RIAA)	Platinum	1,000,000^{^}
^{*} Sales figures based on certification alone.^{^} Shipments figures based on certification alone.
