= The Concert Sinatra =

1963 studio album by Frank Sinatra

Studio album by Frank Sinatra
- Released: June 2, 1963
- Recorded: February 18–21, 1963
- Studios: Goldwyn Studios Scoring Stage (Stage 7), Culver City, California
- Genres: Vocal jazz, traditional pop
- Length: 31:26
- Label: Reprise

Frank Sinatra chronology
Sinatra-Basie: An Historic Musical First (1962)	The Concert Sinatra (1963)	Sinatra's Sinatra (1963)

Professional ratings
Review scores
Source	Rating
AllMusic	3.5/5 stars
Billboard	positive ("Spotlight" pick)
Mojo	4/5 stars
Encyclopedia of Popular Music	5/5 stars
New Record Mirror	4/5 stars

The Concert Sinatra is an album by American singer Frank Sinatra that was released in 1963. It consists of showtunes performed in a 'semi-classical' concert style. Marking a reunion between Sinatra and his frequent collaborator, arranger Nelson Riddle, it was the first full album Riddle arranged on Sinatra's Reprise Records label. Riddle's orchestra consisted of 76 musicians, then the largest assembled for a Sinatra album, and was recorded at four soundstages on the Goldwyn Studios lot using eight tracks of Westrex 35mm film (see sound follower) and twenty-four RCA 44-BX ribbon microphones.

== Track listing ==
1. "I Have Dreamed" (Richard Rodgers, Oscar Hammerstein II) – 3:01
2. "My Heart Stood Still" (Rodgers, Lorenz Hart) – 3:06
3. "Lost in the Stars" (Maxwell Anderson, Kurt Weill) – 4:11
4. "Ol' Man River" (Hammerstein, Jerome Kern) – 4:29
5. "You'll Never Walk Alone" (Rodgers, Hammerstein) – 3:11
6. "Bewitched, Bothered and Bewildered" (Rodgers, Hart) – 3:02
7. "This Nearly Was Mine" (Rodgers, Hammerstein) – 2:49
8. "Soliloquy" (Rodgers, Hammerstein) – 8:05
  Bonus tracks included on the 2012 reissue:
9. "California" (Sammy Cahn, Jimmy Van Heusen) - 3:36
10. "America the Beautiful" (Katharine Lee Bates, Samuel A. Ward) - 2:21

== Complete personnel ==
- Frank Sinatra – vocals
- Nelson Riddle – arranger, conductor
- Russ Hanson – engineer
- Vinton Vernon – mixer
