= Everything Happens to Me (Frank Sinatra album) =

Compilation album by Frank Sinatra
- Released: February 6, 1996
- Recorded: 1962–81
- Genre: Traditional pop
- Length: 69:01
- Label: Reprise
- Producer: Al Cooper

Frank Sinatra chronology
The Complete Reprise Studio Recordings (1995)	Everything Happens to Me (1996)	Frank Sinatra Sings the Select Cole Porter (1996)

Professional ratings
Review scores
Source	Rating
Allmusic	4/5 stars
The Village Voice	A

Everything Happens to Me is a 1996 compilation album by Frank Sinatra. The tracks were selected by Sinatra himself as his favorites and represent more of the tear-jerking "saloon songs" side of his catalog, including "The Gal That Got Away" and "Drinking Again", as well as nostalgic masterpieces "Summer Wind" and "Yesterday".

== Track listing ==
1. Medley: "The Gal That Got Away"/"It Never Entered My Mind" (Harold Arlen, Ira Gershwin)/(Richard Rodgers, Lorenz Hart) - 5:05
2. "Everything Happens to Me" (Matt Dennis, Tom Adair) - 4:11
3. "Once Upon a Time" (Charles Strouse, Lee Adams) - 3:30
4. "Summer Wind" (Heinz Meyer, Hans Bradtke, Johnny Mercer) - 2:53
5. "Once I Loved (O Amor em Paz)" (Antônio Carlos Jobim, Ray Gilbert, Vinícius de Moraes) - 2:37
6. "If I Had You" (Jimmy Campbell, Reginald Connelly, Ted Shapiro) - 4:07
7. "What Are You Doing the Rest of Your Life?" (Alan Bergman, Marilyn Bergman, Michel Legrand) - 4:05
8. "The Second Time Around" (Sammy Cahn, Jimmy Van Heusen) - 3:03
9. "I Hadn't Anyone Till You" (Ray Noble) - 3:44
10. "Come Rain or Come Shine" (Arlen, Mercer) - 4:05
11. "More Than You Know" (Billy Rose, Edward Eliscu, Vincent Youmans) - 3:22
12. "If You Go Away" (Jacques Brel, Rod McKuen) - 3:30
13. "Yesterday" (John Lennon, Paul McCartney) - 3:56
14. "Drinking Again" (Mercer, Doris Tauber) - 3:13
15. "I'll Only Miss Her When I Think Of Her" (Cahn, Van Heusen) - 2:50
16. "How Insensitive" (Jobim, Norman Gimbel, de Moraes) - 3:15
17. "Didn't We?" (Jimmy Webb) - 2:55
18. "All My Tomorrows" (Cahn, Van Heusen) - 4:35
19. "Put Your Dreams Away (For Another Day)" (Paul Mann, George David Weiss, Ruth Lowe) - 3:12

== Personnel ==
- Frank Sinatra - vocals
- Antônio Carlos Jobim - vocals, guitar (tracks 5 and 16)
- Laurindo Almeida - guitar (track 15)
- Nelson Riddle - arranger, conductor
- Don Costa
- Gordon Jenkins
- Robert Farnon
- Claus Ogerman
- Torrie Zito
