= 12 Songs of Christmas (Frank Sinatra, Bing Crosby, and Fred Waring album) =

Studio album by Frank Sinatra, Bing Crosby and Fred Waring
- Released: August 1964
- Recorded: June 16–19, 1964, Hollywood, Los Angeles, California
- Genre: Traditional pop, Christmas
- Length: 38:18
- Label: Reprise; FS 2022
- Producer: Sonny Burke

Frank Sinatra chronology
It Might as Well Be Swing (1964)	12 Songs of Christmas (1964)	Softly, as I Leave You (1964)

Bing Crosby chronology
Robin and the 7 Hoods (1964)	12 Songs of Christmas (1964)	Bing Crosby Sings the Great Country Hits (1965)

12 Songs of Christmas is a 1964 album of Christmas music by Frank Sinatra, Bing Crosby, and Fred Waring's Pennsylvanians. The singers previously collaborated on the album America, I Hear You Singing, which was released earlier the same year. The album was reissued as White Christmas on by WEA budget label Midi in 1973.

While the album has never been reissued on a standalone CD, Reprise Records included it in a special 2-CD "Christmas edition" of their Frank Sinatra compilation Nothing but the Best in 2008.

== Reception ==
Professional ratings
Review scores
Source	Rating
Record Mirror	4/5 stars

In the US, Variety received the album favorably. "This is an attractive compilation of seasonal standards delivered in standout style by Bing Crosby and Frank Sinatra, singly and in tandem, with the polished support of Fred Waring's Pennsylvanians. Among the top sides in this set are "Go Tell It on the Mountain," "The Little Drummer Boy," "I Heard the Bells on Christmas Day" and "The 12 Days of Christmas."

Gramophone in the UK was not so keen, commenting: "'12 Songs of Christmas,' with Bing Crosby, Frank Sinatra and Fred Waring and the Pennsylvanians (Reprise FS 2022). Plenty of expensive talent crammed uncomfortably into a small, well-worn stocking. Obvious, pallid stuff, with the two head groaners actually together on only two tracks, and neither of them anywhere in particularly good voice. Collectors of sheer corn may take a perverse delight in an item called 'We Wish You the Merriest.'"

== Track listing ==
Side one
No.	Title	Writer(s)	Length
1.	"White Christmas"	Irving Berlin	3:46
2.	"It's Christmas Time Again"	Sonny Burke, John Elliot, James K. Harwood	2:50
3.	"Go Tell It on the Mountain"	Traditional, John Wesley Work III	3:25
4.	"An Old-Fashioned Christmas"	Sammy Cahn, Jimmy Van Heusen	3:46
5.	"Where Angels Sang of Peace"	Traditional	2:59
6.	"The Little Drummer Boy"	Katherine K. Davis	3:05

Side two
No.	Title	Writer(s)	Length
1.	"I Heard the Bells on Christmas Day"	Henry Wadsworth Longfellow, Johnny Marks	2:38
2.	"Do You Hear What I Hear?"	Noël Regney, Gloria Shayne Baker	3:11
3.	"The Secret of Christmas"	Cahn, Van Heusen	3:48
4.	"The Twelve Days of Christmas"	Traditional	3:51
5.	"Christmas Candles"	Dean Kay, Vincent O'Dea, Jay Clinton	2:40
6.	"We Wish You the Merriest"	Les Brown	2:19

== Personnel ==
- Fred Waring and the Pennsylvanians (Tracks 1, 5, 8, 10)
- Bing Crosby and Fred Waring (Tracks 2, 9, 11)
- Bing Crosby, Frank Sinatra and Fred Waring (Track 3, 12)
- Frank Sinatra and Fred Waring (Track 4, 6, 7)
