= Soliloquy (song) =

Song from the 1945 American musical Carousel

Song
- Published: 1945
- Songwriter: Oscar Hammerstein II
- Composer: Richard Rodgers

"Soliloquy" is a 1945 song composed by Richard Rodgers, with lyrics by Oscar Hammerstein II, written for their 1945 musical Carousel, where it was introduced by John Raitt. Gordon MacRae performs the song in the 1956 film version.

== Song narrative ==
The now jobless carousel barker Billy Bigelow, the antihero of the musical, sings this seven-and-a-half-minute song just after he has learned he is about to become a father. In it, he happily daydreams over what it would be like to be a father to a boy, but midway through the song, he realizes that it could turn out to be a girl. The song immediately becomes more tender, as he begins to like the idea. At song's end, he considers that a girl needs the very best a father can offer, and decides to get money to provide for her. It is this idea that spurs him on to help his criminal pal Jigger Craigin in committing a robbery, an act which ultimately leads to personal disaster for Billy.

== Performance and recording ==
The song is extremely unusual in that it requires the singer to sing solo (and occasionally speak) for a full seven and a half minutes, in the manner of an operatic aria, without the benefit of an accompanying choral group "taking up the slack", as is usually the case in long musical numbers (e.g. "Ol' Man River"). The lengthy song "Glitter and Be Gay", from Leonard Bernstein's Candide, makes a similar requirement of the soprano performing it.

With the time limitation of about 3:30 on a 10-inch 78 rpm record, Frank Sinatra's 7:57-long recording was released on Columbia's Masterwork label (the classical division) as two sides of a 12-inch record.

=== Notable recordings ===
Cast and studio albums feature John Raitt, Robert Goulet, Robert Merrill, Gordon MacRae, Alfred Drake, Michael Hayden and Samuel Ramey as Billy. Other recordings include the following:

- Frank Sinatra - The Concert Sinatra (1963), A Man And His Music (1965), Sinatra 80th: Live in Concert (1995)
- Sammy Davis Jr. - Mr. Entertainment (1961)
- Anthony Warlow - Centre Stage (1990)
- Mandy Patinkin - Mandy Patinkin (1989)
- Brian Stokes Mitchell - "Simply Broadway" (2012)
- Glen Campbell - Live at the Royal Festival Hall (SWBC-11707) (1977)

== Appearances in other media ==
Mark sings snatches of the song to Rachel in Heartburn after learning she is pregnant with their first child. The song is also featured in Season 1 Episode 7 of Only Murders in the Building.
