= To Love a Child =

Single by Frank Sinatra
- A-side: "To Love a Child"
- B-side: "That's What God Looks Like to Me"
- Released: 1982
- Recorded: Reprise Records, Hollywood, Los Angeles, California; December 5, 1981
- Genre: Swing
- Length: 3:21
- Label: Reprise (US, 45")
- Songwriter(s): Hal David, Joe Raposo

Frank Sinatra singles chronology
"Here's to the Band" (1982)	"To Love a Child" (1982)	"Teach Me Tonight" (1984)

"To Love a Child" is a 1982 popular song composed by Joe Raposo with lyrics by Hal David. It was released as a single by Frank Sinatra. "To Love a Child" was arranged by Don Costa and featured Costa's daughter, Nikka Costa, on backing vocals.

"To Love a Child" was the theme song for the Foster Grandparents program initiated by Nancy Reagan in 1982, and was performed by Reagan and Sinatra at the program's White House launch. All profits from the song and Nancy Reagan's book about the program went to the Foster Grandparents program.
