= Sinatra Sings Days of Wine and Roses, Moon River, and Other Academy Award Winners =

Sinatra Sings Days of Wine and Roses, Moon River and Other Academy Award Winners

Studio album by Frank Sinatra
- Released: March 1964
- Recorded: April 29, 1963, January 27–28, 1964, Hollywood
- Genres: Vocal jazz, traditional pop
- Length: 32:29
- Labels: Reprise; FS 1011
- Producer: Sonny Burke

Frank Sinatra chronology
Reprise Musical Repertory Theatre (1963)	Sinatra Sings Days of Wine and Roses, Moon River and Other Academy Award Winners (1964)	America, I Hear You Singing (1964)

Sinatra Sings Days of Wine and Roses, Moon River, and Other Academy Award Winners (or simply Academy Award Winners) is a 1964 album by Frank Sinatra, focusing on songs that won the Academy Award for Best Song. The orchestra is arranged and conducted by Nelson Riddle.

== Reception ==
Professional ratings
Review scores
Source	Rating
Allmusic	3/5 stars
Record Mirror	4/5 stars

Stephen Thomas Erlewine writing for Allmusic.com gave the album a lukewarm review, describing it as a 'professional and stylish album' but saying that it 'only yields a handful of true gems'. Erlewine found neither Sinatra or Riddle at fault, but said that the record plays as 'a series of individual moments, not as a cohesive collection'. Erlewine praises "The Way You Look Tonight" as one of Sinatra's 'classic performances', and rates "Three Coins in the Fountain" and "All the Way" highly.

== Track listing ==
1. "Days of Wine and Roses" (Henry Mancini, Johnny Mercer) – 2:16
2. "Moon River" (Mancini, Mercer) – 3:20
3. "The Way You Look Tonight" (Jerome Kern, Dorothy Fields) – 3:22
4. "Three Coins in the Fountain" (Sammy Cahn, Jule Styne) – 3:46
5. "In the Cool, Cool, Cool of the Evening" (Mercer, Hoagy Carmichael) – 1:51
6. "Secret Love" (Paul Francis Webster, Sammy Fain) – 3:54
7. "Swinging on a Star" (Johnny Burke, Jimmy Van Heusen) – 2:53
8. "It Might As Well Be Spring" (Richard Rodgers, Oscar Hammerstein II) – 3:26
9. "The Continental" (Herb Magidson, Con Conrad) – 3:14
10. "Love Is a Many-Splendored Thing" (Webster, Fain) – 3:22
11. "All the Way" (Cahn, Van Heusen) – 3:27

== Personnel ==
- Frank Sinatra – vocals
- Nelson Riddle – arrangements, conductor

== Charts ==
Chart (1964)	Peak position
US Billboard 200	10
