= Sinatra 80th: Live in Concert =

Sinatra 80th: Live In Concert

Live album by Frank Sinatra
- Released: November 14, 1995
- Recorded: 1987–1988
- Genre: Traditional pop; vocal jazz
- Length: 52:32
- Label: Capitol

Frank Sinatra chronology
The Complete Recordings Nineteen Thirty-Nine (1995)	Sinatra 80th: Live In Concert (1995)	Sinatra 80th: All the Best (1995)

Professional ratings
Review scores
Source	Rating
AllMusic	2/5 stars

Sinatra 80th: Live in Concert is a live album by American singer Frank Sinatra, released in 1995.

The album is a compilation of previously unreleased live recordings from his concerts between 1987 and 1988. (The title is a reference to Sinatra's age at the time of the album's release, not at the time of the performances.) The final track, "My Way", is an outtake from the 1993 album Duets. The album was certified gold by the RIAA.

== Track listing ==
1. "You Are the Sunshine of My Life" (Stevie Wonder) – 2:37
2. "What Now My Love" (Gilbert Bécaud, Carl Sigman, Pierre Delanoë) – 2:41
3. "My Heart Stood Still" (Richard Rodgers, Lorenz Hart) – 3:28
4. "What's New?" (Bob Haggart, Johnny Burke) – 2:38
5. "For Once in My Life" (Ronald Miller, Orlando Murden) – 2:56
6. "If" (David Gates) – 3:22
7. "In the Still of the Night" (Cole Porter) – 3:38
8. "Soliloquy" (Rodgers, Oscar Hammerstein II) – 11:14
9. "Maybe This Time" (Fred Ebb, John Kander) - 2:52
10. "Where or When" (Rodgers, Hart) – 4:08
11. "You Will Be My Music" (Joe Raposo) – 4:25
12. "Strangers in the Night" (Bert Kaempfert, Charles Singleton, Eddie Snyder) – 2:09
13. "Angel Eyes" (Earl Brent, Matt Dennis) - 4:26
14. "Theme from New York, New York" (Ebb, Kander) - 4:29
15. "My Way" [with Luciano Pavarotti] (Paul Anka, Claude Francois, Jacques Revaux, Gilles Thibault) - 3:33
- Tracks 1–6, 9–11, 13–14 recorded in Dallas, October 24, 1987.
- Tracks 7–8, 12 recorded in Detroit, December 1988.

== Personnel ==
- Frank Sinatra – vocals
- Bill Miller – conductor, piano
- Tony Mottola – guitar
- Irving Cottler – drums
