= Let us break bread together =

Hymn

- by Anonymous
- Genre: Hymn
- Written: Before 1925
- Language: English
- Meter: 4/4
- Published: 1925

"Let us break bread together" is a traditional Christian hymn. Its melody is searching, simple, major key, and has simple lyrics.

"Let us break bread together" follows in the tradition of most Black spirituals. Black spirituals were mostly composed by African slaves who had no training in western music. The tune varied but became known widely after publication in The Second Book of Negro Spirituals in 1926.

== Mentions in the Bible ==
"Breaking bread" is mentioned 21 times in the Christian Bible:

Leviticus 2:6	Matthew 14:19	Matthew 14:20
Matthew 15:36	Matthew 26:26	Mark 6:41
Mark 8:6	Mark 14:22	Luke 9:16
Luke 22:19	Luke 24:30	Luke 24:35
Acts 2:42	Acts 2:46	Acts 20:7
Acts 20:11	Acts 27:35	1 Corinthians 10:16
1 Corinthians 11:24	1 Corinthians 10:16-17	1 Corinthians 11:24-25

== The hymn's roots ==
In the Canterbury Dictionary of Hymnology, written by United Methodist Hymnal editor, Dr. Carlton Young, suggests that this "spiritual was formed in the West African Gullah/Geechee slave culture that developed in the costal areas of South-Eastern colonial America, including St Helena Island, Beaufort, and Charleston, South Carolina ..."

== The hymn ==
American slaves could communicate the intention of escaping by singing "Let us break bread together" It is a hymn of the Underground Railroad.

The hymn is common in holy communion services, reminding us of our spiritual food and drink presented through the bread and wine. The hymn or spiritual is popular among young people, as on acoustic guitar it is easy to accompany. It has gradually found acceptance among older Christians as well. This is clearly shown by its inclusion in many hymn books and albums such as the late 1970s The Old Rugged Cross by the respected gospel singer George Beverly Shea.

== Let us break bread together and the Catholic church ==
The hymn is frequently sung at Holy Communion time in Black Catholic churches and elsewhere, and is number 135 in Lead Me, Guide Me, the first hymnal ever commissioned for the use of Black Catholics. It was not included in the second edition of the hymnal, however, and in 2020 the United States Conference of Catholic Bishops questioned the song's theology and recommended it not be used.

== Lyrics ==
Lyrics are public domain.

Let us break bread together on our knees, (on our knees).
Let us break bread together on our knees, (on our knees).
When I fall on my knees with my face to the rising sun,
O Lord, have mercy on me. (on me)

Let us drink wine together on our knees, (on our knees).
Let us drink wine together on our knees, (on our knees).
When I fall on my knees with my face to the rising sun,
O Lord, have mercy on me. (on me)

Let us praise God together on our knees, (on our knees).
Let us praise God together on our knees, (on our knees).
When I fall on my knees with my face to the rising sun,
O Lord, have mercy on me. (on me)
