= Grandes Éxitos del Cine de los Años 60 =

Grandes Exitos del Cine de los Años 60

Studio album by Connie Francis
- Released: July 1967
- Recorded: November 9, 1960; May 8–9, 1967
- Genre: Pop
- Length: 27:44
- Label: MGM; E-4474 (mono)/SE-4474 (stereo)
- Producer: Tom Wilson

Connie Francis chronology
Happiness - Connie Francis On Broadway Today (1967)	Grandes Exitos del Cine de los Años 60 (1967)	My Heart Cries For You (1967)

Grandes Exitos del Cine de los Años 60 is a studio album recorded for the U. S. market by entertainer Connie Francis.

== Background ==
Between March 1965 and May 1966, Francis had recorded an English album featuring songs from the soundtracks of then current or recent motion pictures:

- "Call me irresponsible" from "Papa's Delicate Condition" (1963)
- "Dance My Trouble Away (Zorba's Dance)" from "Zorba the Greek" (1964)
- "Forget Domani" from "The Yellow Rolls-Royce" (1965)
- "I Will Wait For You" from "The Umbrellas of Cherbourg" (1964)
- "Somewhere, My Love (Lara's Theme)" from "Doctor Zhivago" (1965)
- "Strangers In The Night" from "A Man Could Get Killed" (1966)
- "The Good Life" from "The Seven Deadly_Sins" (1962)
- "The Phoenix Love Theme (Senza fine)" from "The Flight of the Phoenix" (1965)
- "The Second Time Around" from "High Time" (1960)
- "The Shadow of Your Smile" from "The Sandpiper" (1965)
- "Wives and Lovers" from "Wives and Lovers" (1963)
- "You're Gonna Hear From Me" from "Inside Daisy Clover" (1965)

The album had been released in July 1966 as MGM Records 12" Album E-4382 (mono pressings) and SE-4382 under the name Movie Greats Of The 60s.

In May 1967, Francis used the instrumental playbacks of nine of the album's featured songs and overdubbed Spanish vocals. "Dance my trouble away", "I will wait for you", and "The Phoenix Love Theme (Senza fine)" were omitted and not re-recorded in Spanish. By adding "Donde hay chicos" (already recorded in 1960), the Spanish version of "Where The Boys Are", the title song from Francis' own movie of the same name, a set of ten songs was compiled and released in July 1967 as MGM Records 12" album E-4474 (mono pressings) and SE-4474 (stereo pressings) under the name "Grandes Exitos del Cine de los Años 60". With an identical cover design, "Grandes Exitos del Cine de los Años 60" was virtually the Spanish edition of "Movie Greats Of The 60s" with a slightly modified track listing.

"Grandes Exitos del Cine de los Años 60" was also released in Spain as Volume 3 of MGM's local series of albums titled "Connie Francis canta en español y en stéreo".

== Track listing ==
=== Side A ===
#	Title	Original English Version	Songwriter	Length
1.	"No puedo olvidar"	"Strangers in the night"	Bert Kaempfert, Charles Singleton, Eddie Snyder	3.02
2.	"Eres"	"Call me irresponsible"	Jimmy Van Heusen, Sammy Cahn	2.11
3.	"Ya te hablarán de mi"	"You're gonna hear from me"	André Previn	2.30
4.	"El segundo amor"	"The Second Time Around"	Jimmy Van Heusen, Sammy Cahn	2.22
5.	"Sueño de Amor"	"Somewhere, my Love (Lara's Theme)"	Sammy Fain, Paul Francis Webster	2.57

=== Side B ===
#	Title	Original English Version	Songwriter	Length
1.	"La sombra de tu sonrisa"	"The Shadow Of Your Smile"	Johnny Mandel, Paul Francis Webster	2.54
2.	"Fue nuestro amor"	"Wives And Lovers"	Burt Bacharach, Hal David	2.56
3.	"La buena vida"	"The Good Life"	Sacha Distel, Jack Reardon	3.32
4.	"Donde hay chicos"	"Where The Boys Are"	Neil Sedaka, Howard Greenfield	2.38
5.	"Olvidemos el mañana"	"Forget Domani"	Riz Ortolani, Norman Newell	2.42

NOTE: Only the songwriters of the original English-language versions are given; the Spanish lyricists may be found here.
