= Forget Domani =

1964 song

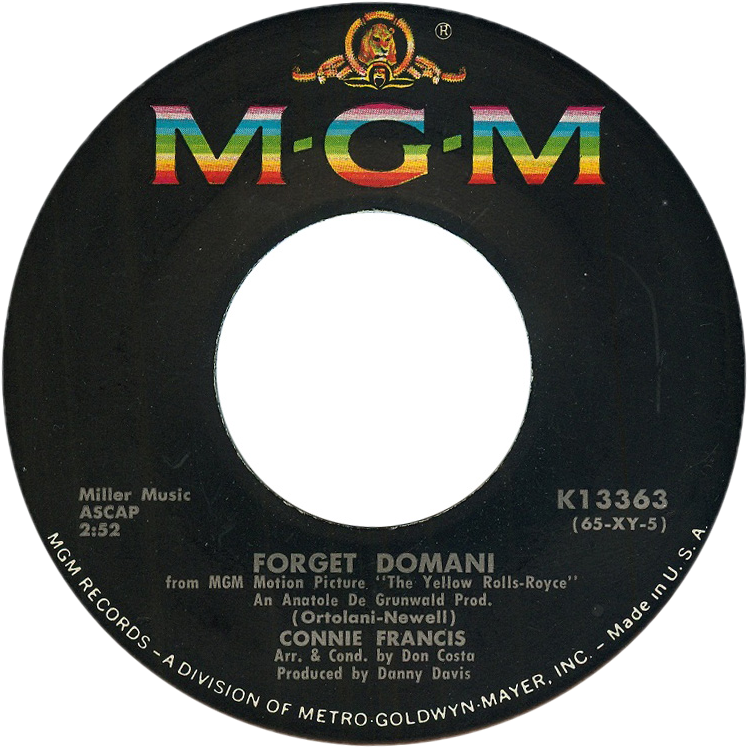

Single by Connie Francis

from the album Movie Greats of the 60s
- B-side: "No One Ever Sends Me Roses"
- Released: May 1965
- Recorded: January 22, 1965
- Genre: easy listening
- Length: 2:41
- Label: MGM Records K 13363
- Songwriter(s): Riz Ortolani, Norman Newell
- Producer(s): Danny Davis

Connie Francis US singles chronology
"Wishing It Was You" / "You're Mine (Just When You're Lonely)" (1965)	"Forget Domani" / "No One Ever Sends Me Roses" (1965)	"Roundabout" / "Bossa Nova Hand Dance" (1965)

"Forget Domani"
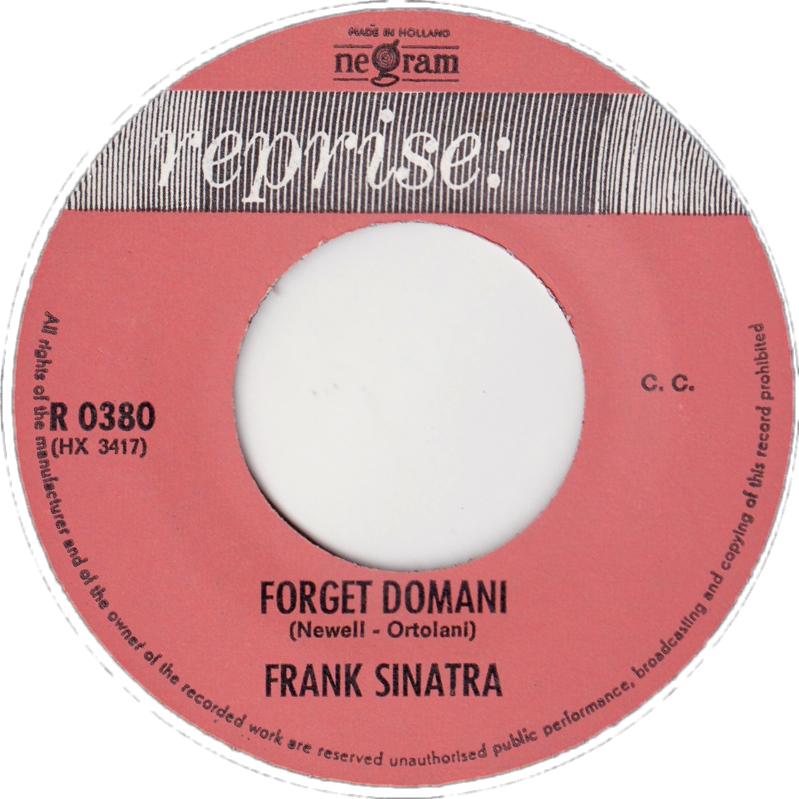

Single by Frank Sinatra

from the album Frank Sinatra's Greatest Hits
- B-side: "I Can't Believe I'm Losing You"
- Released: May 1965
- Recorded: May 6, 1965
- Genre: easy listening
- Length: 2:32
- Label: Reprise Records
- Songwriter(s): Riz Ortolani, Norman Newell
- Producer(s): Jimmy Bowen

Frank Sinatra US singles chronology
"Tell Her (You Love Her Each Day)" (1965)	"Forget Domani" (1965)	"When Somebody Loves You" (1965)

"Forget Domani" is a song introduced in the 1964 film The Yellow Rolls-Royce being a composition by Riz Ortolani, who scored the film, and lyricist Norman Newell.

== As soundtrack item ==
The song's theme of forgetting domani — Italian for "tomorrow" — is relevant to each of the three segments that comprise the storyline of The Yellow Rolls-Royce as each deals with lovers whose trysts involve a disregard for consequences, and the tune of the chorus of "Forget Domani" is incorporated in the theme song that plays underneath the film's opening credits. Otherwise, "Forget Domani" is heard only in the film's second segment set in Italy circa 1940 and focused on the dalliance between the gun moll (Shirley MacLaine) of an American gangster (George C. Scott) with a local tourist photographer (Alain Delon). The vocal version of "Forget Domani", credited to veteran Italian vocalist Katyna Ranieri who was Ortolani's wife, is seen performed by a singer in a tavern. The tune of "Forget Domani" is also heard as background music during a key love scene between the MacLaine/Delon characters set in the "Sapphire Grotto".

The Golden Globe winner for Best Original Song, "Forget Domani" did not receive a corresponding Academy Award nomination.

The Yellow Rolls-Royce was an MGM production and MGM Records issued singles of both a vocal version of "Forget Domani" by Katyna Ranieri and an instrumental version — subtitled "(Forget Tomorrow)" — by Riz Ortolani & His Orchestra in the UK in December 1964, the film The Yellow Rolls Royce having its UK premiere on December 31, 1964.

== Connie Francis/ Frank Sinatra versions ==
=== Connie Francis recording - background ===
On January 22, 1965, MGM Record's top vocalist Connie Francis — whose Italian heritage was a key component of her public persona — cut "Forget Domani" in a Hollywood CA recording session produced by Danny Davis: the arranger was Don Costa. Francis' version of "Forget Domani" had a UK single release in February 1965: however Francis concurrent US single release was another track from her January 22, 1965 recording session: "For Mama", with "Forget Domani" being afforded its US single release subsequent to the May 13, 1965 US premiere of the film The Yellow Rolls Royce. While the UK single release of Francis' "Forget Domani" had featured the track "No Better Off" as B-side, for its US single release Francis' "Forget Domani" featured as B-side the track "No One Ever Sends Me Roses"; in its Australian single release Francis' "Forget Domani" was coupled with "For Mama".

=== Frank Sinatra recording - background ===
Frank Sinatra, who, like Francis, was an American singer of Italian descent — recorded "Forget Domani" in a May 6, 1965 session at United Western Recorders in Hollywood produced by Jimmy Bowen and arranged by Ernie Freeman; the orchestra was conducted by Donnie Lanier. Sinatra cut the song a week before the US premiere of The Yellow Rolls-Royce which occurred May 13, 1965.

=== Chart history ===
Both Connie Francis' and Frank Sinatra's "Forget Domani" singles debuted on the Hot 100 in Billboard dated June 26, 1965, at respectively number 95 (Francis) and number 100 (Sinatra), and over the next six weeks both singles made slight roughly equal chart ascents to peak on the Hot 100 dated July 31, 1965, at respectively number 78 (Sinatra) and number 79 (Francis): both singles charted for one subsequent week for a total Hot 100 run of seven weeks. Billboard's Easy Listening chart afforded the Connie Francis and Frank Sinatra "Forget Domani" singles respective peaks of number 16 and number 13.

"Forget Domani" was a number-one hit in South Africa for Connie Francis.

=== Other info ===
In July 1965 Sinatra's version became the fourth non-charting "Forget Domani" single released in the UK.

The Connie Francis' version of "Forget Domani" did not appear on one of her albums until the July 1966 release Movie Greats of the 60s. The Frank Sinatra version did not appear on one of his albums until the 1967 release Frank Sinatra's Greatest Hits.

Both Connie Francis and Frank Sinatra also recorded "Forget Domani" with its Italian lyrics with the Sinatra track being promoted as the singer's first Italian language recording. Francis' version charted at number 49 in Italy, the original version by Katyna Ranieri being more successful there at number 24. Francis also recorded "Forget Domani" in Japanese to serve as B-side for her English-language single of "Forget Domani" as released in Japan where that single charted as high as number 13. On May 9, 1967, Francis recorded the Spanish rendering of "Forget Domani": "Olvidemos el Mañana", which appeared on her Spanish-language album Grandes Exitos del Cine de los Años 60.

"Forget Domani" was the second 1965 Connie Francis single to vie on the Hot 100 with a rival version by a male vocalist: on the Hot 100 dated March 6, 1965 "For Mama" had been a chart debut at both number 86 for Francis and at number 88 for Jerry Vale with both versions charting for seven weeks total and peaking in their sixth week at respectively number 48 (Francis) and number 53 (Vale).

Although not a major hit for Connie Francis overall, her "Forget Domani" did reach #1 on the hit parade for South Africa dated 18 June 1965.

== Other versions ==
A third American singer of Italian descent: Perry Como, recorded "Forget Domani" for his 1966 album release Perry Como in Italy: sessions for that album commenced May 9, 1966 at RCA Italiana Studios in Rome with Andy Wiswell producing and Nick Perito as conductor/arranger. "Forget Domani" was issued as a single but did not chart.

"Forget Domani" has also been recorded by Willeke Alberti ("Elke Dag Denk Ik Aan Zondag" _{Dutch}), Gitte Hænning ("Glöm Bort I Morgon" _{Swedish} also recorded by Ann-Louise Hanson), Don Cornell, Doug Crosley, Karina ("Olvidemos el Mañana" _{Spanish}), Halina Kunicka (pl) ("Zaczekajmy Z Tym Do Jutra" _{Polish}), Eija Merilä (fi) ("Ei Ajatella Huomispäivää" _{Finnish}), Annie Philippe (fr) ("C'est Loin Domani" _{French}) also recorded by Margot Lefebvre (fr), and Tonia ("Ce N'est Pas Loin Domani" _{French}). Instrumentalists who have recorded "Forget Domani" include Laurindo Almeida, Al Caiola, George Feyer, André Kostelanetz, Enoch Light, Peter Nero, Roger Williams (with the Harry Simeone Chorale), Hugo Winterhalter, and Frankie Yankovic
