= Frank Sinatra's Greatest Hits, Vol. 2 =

Greatest Hits, Vol. 2

Greatest hits album by Frank Sinatra
- Released: May 1972
- Recorded: May 27, 1965–October 26, 1970
- Genre: Easy listening; vocal jazz; traditional pop
- Length: 37:38
- Label: Reprise; FS 1034
- Producer: Don Costa, Sonny Burke, Frank Sinatra

Frank Sinatra chronology
Sinatra & Company (1971)	Greatest Hits, Vol. 2 (1972)	Ol' Blue Eyes Is Back (1973)

Professional ratings
Review scores
Source	Rating
Allmusic	3/5 stars

Frank Sinatra's Greatest Hits, Vol. 2 is the second compilation of material by American singer Frank Sinatra released on his own Reprise Records, which like its predecessor, consisted of singles and songs from movie soundtracks. Vol. 2 picks up where Frank Sinatra's Greatest Hits leaves off, so all of the tracks date from 1968 to 1970, except for "The September of My Years", which dates back to 1965. Though the song "My Way" became Sinatra's signature song, it was not a big hit in the US. In the UK it went to #5 and spent 75 weeks in the Top 40. The highest charting U.S. single in this collection is "Cycles" which peaked at #23. The remaining tracks represent the sound of Sinatra's music in the late 1960s, which was more laid back than his early 1960s swinging tunes, with the B-side "Star!" being a notable exception. Vol. 2 peaked at #88 on the album charts in the summer of 1972 during Sinatra's brief retirement from show business.

UK and European versions, which were released in 1970 under the title Greatest Hits, Vol. II (using a Roman numeral), featured a different cover and lineup of songs. "My Way" and "Love's Been Good To Me" being the only common tracks. Confusingly the original U.S. album was released in France and Italy as Greatest Hits, Vol. 3 in 1973.

== Track listing ==
US track listing, side 1
No.	Title	Writer(s)	Length
1.	"My Way"	Paul Anka, Claude François, Jacques Revaux, Gilles Thibault	4:34
2.	"A Man Alone"	Rod McKuen	3:46
3.	"Cycles"	Judith Caldwell	3:13
4.	"Bein' Green"	Joe Raposo	3:00
5.	"Love's Been Good To Me"	McKuen	3:26
6.	"I'm Not Afraid"	Jacques Brel, Gérard Jouannest, McKuen	3:42

Side 2
No.	Title	Writer(s)	Length
7.	"Goin' Out of My Head"	Teddy Randazzo, Bobby Weinstein	2:47
8.	"Something"	George Harrison	3:34
9.	"What's Now is Now"	Bob Gaudio, Jake Holmes	4:04
10.	"Star!"	Jimmy Van Heusen, Sammy Cahn	2:36
11.	"The September of My Years"	Van Heusen, Cahn	3:15
Total length:			37:57

UK track listing, side 1
No.	Title	Writer(s)	Length
1.	"The Shadow of Your Smile"	Johnny Mandel, Paul Francis Webster	2.17
2.	"Yesterday"	John Lennon, Paul McCartney	3.30
3.	"Blue Lace"	Riz Ortolani, Bill Jacob, Patty Jacob	2.42
4.	"For Once in My Life"	Ron Miller, Orlando Murden	2.50
5.	"Born Free"	John Barry, Don Black	2.02
6.	"My Way"	Paul Anka, Claude François, Jacques Revaux, Gilles Thibault	4.35

Side 2
No.	Title	Writer(s)	Length
7.	"Little Green Apples"	Bobby Russell	5.00
8.	"Both Sides Now"	Joni Mitchell	2.55
9.	"Mrs. Robinson"	Paul Simon	2.55
10.	"Call Me Irresponsible"	Sammy Cahn, James Van Heusen	2.45
11.	"Gentle On My Mind"	John Hartford	3.25
12.	"Love's Been Good To Me"	Rod McKuen	3:25
Total length:			38:21

== Personnel ==
- Frank Sinatra - vocals
- Nelson Riddle - arranger, conductor
- Don Costa
- Gordon Jenkins
- Joseph Scott
- Lennie Hayton
