= Love Italian Style =

Love Italian Style may refer to:

- Love Italian Style (film), a 1965 Italian comedy
- Love, Italian Style, a 1967 album by Connie Francis
- Love Italian Style: The Secrets to My Hot and Happy Marriage, a 2013 book by Italian-American reality TV star Melissa Gorga
