= Frank Sinatra's Greatest Hits! =

Greatest hits album by Frank Sinatra
- Released: August 1968 (LP); October 1990 (CD)
- Recorded: July 17, 1964 – July 24, 1967
- Genre: Vocal jazz, easy listening
- Length: 33:40
- Label: Reprise; FS 1025
- Producer: Jimmy Bowen; Sonny Burke

Frank Sinatra chronology
Francis A. & Edward K. (1968)	Frank Sinatra's Greatest Hits! (1968)	The Sinatra Family Wish You a Merry Christmas (1968)

Professional ratings
Review scores
Source	Rating
Allmusic	4.5/5 stars

Frank Sinatra's Greatest Hits! is the first compilation by American singer Frank Sinatra released by his own Reprise Records label in 1968. It concentrates on mostly single releases from the mid to late 1960s, which fluctuates between adult contemporary pop and jazzy swing. The album opens up with Sinatra's recent number one hit "Strangers in the Night" and continues through the varied styles of music Sinatra recorded in the 60s, from easy listening ballads like "It Was a Very Good Year" and "Softly, as I Leave You" to contemporary pop like "When Somebody Loves You" and "That's Life". Greatest Hits was a modest hit, peaking at #55 on the album charts in late 1968. A second volume was issued in 1972, Frank Sinatra's Greatest Hits, Vol. 2. Both albums have since been supplanted with newer and more cohesive compilations. Another Sinatra "Greatest Hits" compilation, The Best of Frank Sinatra consisting of older material, was issued the same year by Capitol Records.

== Track listing ==
1. "Strangers in the Night" (Bert Kaempfert, Charles Singleton, Eddie Snyder) - 2:25
2. "Summer Wind" (Heinz Meier, Hans Bradtke, Johnny Mercer) - 2:53
3. "It Was a Very Good Year" (Ervin Drake) - 4:25
4. "Somewhere in Your Heart" (Russell Faith, Clarence Keltner) - 2:26
5. "Forget Domani" (Norman Newell, Riz Ortolani) - 2:36
6. "Somethin' Stupid" (with Nancy Sinatra) (Carson Parks) - 2:35
7. "That's Life" (Kelly Gordon, Dean Kay Thompson) - 3:07
8. "Tell Her (You Love Her Each Day)" (Gil Ward, Charles Watkins) - 2:40
9. "The World We Knew (Over and Over)" (Kaempfert, Herbert Rehbein, Carl Sigman) - 2:47
10. "When Somebody Loves You" (Sammy Cahn, Jimmy Van Heusen) - 1:54
11. "This Town" (Lee Hazlewood) - 3:06
12. "Softly, as I Leave You" (Hal Shaper, Antonio DeVita, Giorgio Calabrese) - 2:50

Notes

- "Strangers in the Night" recorded on April 11, 1966
- The Orchestra on Tracks 1, 3 and 9 includes 16 Violins
- "Summer Wind" recorded on May 16, 1966
- The Orchestra on "Summer Wind" includes 9 Violins
- "It Was a Very Good Year" recorded on April 22, 1965
- "Somewhere in Your Heart" recorded on November 10, 1964
- The Orchestra on Tracks 4, 7 and 12 includes 12 Violins
- Background Vocals on Tracks 4–5, 9 and 12 were sung by an Unidentified Vocal Group
- "Forget Domani" recorded on May 6, 1965
- The Orchestra on Tracks 5 and 11 includes 8 Violins
- "Somethin' Stupid" recorded on February 1, 1967
- The Orchestra on Tracks 6, 8 and 10 includes 10 Violins
- "That's Life" recorded on October 18, 1966
- Tracks 8 and 10 recorded on April 14, 1965
- "The World We Knew (Over and Over)" recorded June 29–July 1, 1967
- The Orchestra on "The World We Knew (Over and Over)" includes 3 French Horns and 6 Violas
- "This Town" recorded on June 30, July 24 and July 27, 1967
- "Softly, as I Leave You" recorded on July 17, 1964

== Personnel ==
Information is based on Frank Sinatra's recording session information from the Jazz Discography and Sinatraology websites

=== Vocalists ===
- Frank Sinatra - Vocals (1–3, 6, 11, Lead on 4–5, 7–10, 12)
- Betty Allan - Background Vocals (8, 10)
- Ella Halloran - Background Vocals (8, 10)
- Jack Halloran - Background Vocals (8, 10)
- Bill Kanady - Background Vocals (8, 10)
- Loulie Jean Norman - Background Vocals (8, 10)
- Thurl Ravenscroft - Background Vocals (8, 10)
- Paul Sandberg - Background Vocals (8, 10)
- Betty Jane Baker - Background Vocals (7–8, 10)
- The Blossoms - Background Vocals (7)
- Fanita James - Blossoms group member (7)
- Gwen Johnson - Background Vocals (7)
- Jackie Ward - Background Vocals (7)
- Jean King - Blossoms group member (7)
- Darlene Love - Blossoms group member (7)
- Nancy Sinatra - Vocals (6)

=== Leaders ===
- Ernie Freeman - Musical arrangement (1, 4–5, 7–10, 12), Conductor (1, 4–5, 7, 12), Piano (5, 8, 10)
- Gordon Jenkins - Music arrangement (3), Conductor (3, 8–10)
- Donnie Lanier - Conductor (1, 5, 7–8, 10), Guitar (4, 11, additional on 9)
- Claus Ogerman - Conductor (6)
- Nelson Riddle - Musical arrangement, Conductor (2)
- Billy Strange - Musical arrangement (6), Conductor (6, 11, overdubs on 9)

=== Strings ===
- Chuck Berghofer - String Bass (1, 4–5, 8, 10–11, additional on 9)
- Maurice Bialkin - Cello (9)
- Maurice Brown - Cello (9)
- Peter Makas Jr. - Cello (9)
- Charles McCracken - Cello (9)
- Alan Shulman - Cello (9)
- Joseph Tekula - Cello (9)
- Norman Botnick - Viola (7)
- Abraham Weiss - Viola (7)
- Ray Brown - String Bass (7)
- Joseph DiFiore - Viola (1, 5, 7, 12)
- Alvin Dinkin - Viola (3–4, 12)
- Joseph DiTullio - Cello (7)
- Frederick Seykora - Cello (7)
- Justin DiTullio - Cello (2, 12)
- Jesse Ehrlich - Cello (1, 4, 8, 10–12)
- Anne Goodman - Cello (4, 8, 10, 12)
- Elizabeth Greenschpoon - Cello (2)
- Allan Harshman - Viola (4)
- Milt Hinton - String Bass (9, 11)
- Milt Holland - Additional Percussion (9)
- Harry Hyams - Viola (1, 5, 8, 10–11)
- Armand Kaproff - Cello (1–3, 7)
- Carol Kaye - Electric Bass (6), Fender Bass (11, additional on 9)
- Louis Kievman - Viola (3)
- Lawrence Knechtel - Fender Bass (7, additional on 9), Additional String Bass (11)
- Joe Mondragon - String Bass (12)
- Gareth Nuttycombe - Viola (12)
- Alexander Neiman - Viola (1, 4–5, 7–8, 10–12)
- Ralph Peña - String Bass (2, 6)
- Kurt Reher - Cello (4, 7, 12)
- Paul Robyn - Viola (2–4)
- Mike Rubin - String Bass (3)
- Myron Sandler - Viola (5)
- Emmet Sargeant - Cello (1, 8, 10, 12)
- Joseph Saxon - Viola (5), Cello (1, 4, 8, 10–12)
- Barbara Simons - Viola (2)
- Darrel Terwilliger - Viola (1)

=== Horns and Woodwinds ===
- Vincent Abato - Saxophone, Woodwinds (9)
- Ray Beckenstein - Saxophone, Woodwinds (9)
- George Berg - Saxophone, Woodwinds (9)
- Phil Bodner - Saxophone, Woodwinds (9)
- Harry Estrin - Saxophone, Woodwinds (9)
- Ted Gompers - Saxophone, Woodwinds (9)
- Romeo Penque - Saxophone, Woodwinds (9)
- Bob Alexander - Trombone (9)
- Wayne Andre - Trombone (9)
- Buddy Morrow - Trombone (9)
- Louis Blackburn - Trombone (7–8, 10)
- Robert Bryant - Trumpet (8, 10, 12)
- Pete Candoli - Trumpet (2)
- Don Fagerquist - Trumpet (2)
- Ray Triscari - Trumpet (2)
- Pete Carpenter - Trombone (8, 10)
- Roy Caton - Trumpet (6, 8, 10–11)
- Buddy Collette - Saxophone (7), Woodwinds (7, 12)
- Marshall Cram - Trombone (4)
- Mel Davis - Trumpet (9)
- Bernie Glow - Trumpet (9)
- Markie Markowitz - Trumpet (9)
- Ernie Royal - Trumpet (9)
- Clark Terry - Trumpet (9)
- Vincent DeRosa - French Horn (1)
- Richard Perissi - French Horn (1)
- Gale Robinson - French Horn (1)
- Henry Sigismonti - French Horn (1)
- Melinda Eckels - Oboe (3)
- Arnold Koblentz - Oboe (3)
- Virgil Evans - Trumpet (11)
- Dick Forrest - Trumpet (11)
- Paul Faulise - Bass Trombone (9)
- Chuck Gentry - Saxophone, Woodwinds (2, 5)
- Justin Gordon - Saxophone, Woodwinds (2)
- Abe Most - Saxophones, Woodwinds (2)
- Bill Green - Flute (1), Saxophone, Woodwinds (2, 5, 7, 11)
- Lloyd Hildebrand - Bassoon (3)
- James Horn - Saxophone, Woodwinds (11)
- Dick Hyde - Trombone (7, 11, additional on 9)
- Lew McCreary - Trombone (7, 11, additional on 9)
- Clyde Hylton - Clarinet (3)
- Wayne Songer - Clarinet (3)
- Plas Johnson - Saxophone, Woodwinds (5, 7)
- Harry Klee - Clarinet (3), Saxophone, Woodwinds (2)
- Robert Knight - Bass Trombone (11)
- Andreas Kostelas - Flute (1)
- Cappy Lewis - Trumpet (2, 7)
- Oliver Mitchell - Trumpet (6–7, 11)
- Dick Noel - Trombone (2)
- Tommy Pederson - Trombone (2)
- Tom Shepard - Trombone (2)
- Morris Repass - Trombone (11)
- George Roberts - Bass Trombone (2)
- Willie Schwartz - Flute (4), Saxophone (5, 7, Alto on 4), Woodwinds (5, 7)
- Anthony Terran - Trumpet (7–8, 10–11)

=== Other Instruments ===
- Hal Blaine - Drums (1, 4–8, 10–12, additional on 9)
- Eddie Brackett Jr. - Percussion (1, 5, 7–8, 10), Additional Drums (11)
- Dennis Budimir - Guitar (8, 10, additional on 9)
- Al Caiola - Guitar (9, 11)
- Glen Campbell - Guitar (1, 6, 11)
- Frank Capp - Percussion (5, 8, 10–11)
- Alvin Casey - Guitar (1, 6, 11, acoustic on 7)
- Gary Chester - Drums (9, 11)
- Gary Coleman - Vibraphone (7), Additional Percussion (9)
- Irv Cottler - Drums (2)
- George Devens - Percussion (9, 11)
- Gene DiNovi - Piano (4)
- Lincoln Mayorga - Piano (4)
- Nick Fatool - Drums (3)
- Victor Feldman - Percussion (2, 6, 11)
- Stan Freeman - Piano (9, 11)
- Eric Gale - Guitar (9, 11)
- Gene Garf - Piano (12)
- Al Hendrickson - Guitar (12)
- Bobby Gibbons - Guitar (12, additional on 9)
- John Gray - Guitar (5, 8, 10)
- Artie Kane - Organ played by (2)
- Phil Kraus - Percussion (9, 11)
- Carl Lynch - Guitar (9, 11)
- Michael Melvoin - Additional Piano (11), Organ played by (7)
- Bill Miller - Piano (1–4, 6–8, 10–12)
- Louis Morell - Guitar (11, additional on 9), Acoustic Guitar (7)
- Donald Owens - Piano (6)
- Bill Pitman - Guitar (1, 4–5, 8, 10)
- Bucky Pizzarelli - Guitar (9, 11)
- Ray Pohlman - Electric Guitar (7)
- Don Randi - Additional Piano (9)
- Emil Richards - Percussion (1, 5, 8, 10, 12), Mallets (4)
- Bobby Rosengarden - Drums (9, 11), Percussion (9)
- Margaret Ross - Harp (9)
- Michel Rubini - Piano (1)
- Leon Russell - Piano (5, 8, 10)
- Ray Sherman - Piano (12)
- Tommy Tedesco - Guitar (1, 4–5, 12)
- Vincent Terri - Guitar (3)
- Toots Thielemans - Guitar (9, 11), Harmonica (11)
- Kathryn Thompson Vail - Harp (3)
- Al Viola - Guitar (2, 5)
- Moe Wechsler - Piano (9, 11)
