= Francis A. & Edward K. =

1968 album by Frank Sinatra

Studio album by Frank Sinatra & Duke Ellington
- Released: 1968
- Recorded: December 11 – 12, 1967, Hollywood, Los Angeles, California
- Genre: Vocal jazz
- Length: 35:14
- Label: Reprise
- Producer: Sonny Burke

Frank Sinatra chronology
The World We Knew (1967)	Francis A. & Edward K. (1968)	Frank Sinatra's Greatest Hits (1968)

Duke Ellington chronology
...And His Mother Called Him Bill (1967)	Francis A. & Edward K. (1968)	Yale Concert (1968)

Professional ratings
Review scores
Source	Rating
AllMusic	2.5/5 stars
DownBeat	4/5 stars

Francis A. & Edward K. is an album by Frank Sinatra with Duke Ellington and his big band.

== Recording and music ==
The original intention was to record a mix of standards and originals, but only one original, Ellington's "I Like the Sunrise", was used. The arrangements were written by Billy May. All of the performances are at a slow tempo except "Come Back to Me".

== Release and reception ==
Francis A. & Edward K. was released by Reprise Records. The AllMusic reviewer wrote that both Sinatra and the Ellington band gave uneven performances; however, HiFiStereo Review gave it a "Best Of The Month" review in the May 1968 edition, in which reviewer Peter Reilly observed, "Two fine musicians at the peak of their powers have made an album twice as youthful and carefree and unpretentious as most people less than half their age."

Jonathan Scull included the album in his 1996 list in the yearly Stereophile feature "Records To Die For". He wrote, "Enormous recorded acoustic, an illuminated, palpable, and confident Sinatra, restrained yet exuberant Billy May arrangements --- truly a record to die for. Find it --- it's out there. I promise you a little bit of analog heaven".

Dan Morgenstern assigned the album 4 stars in his DownBeat review. He observed that the record grows on you with repeated listening. He wrote, "To put it bluntly, this would have been a great album if Sinatra had been in top voice. On a few tracks, he is; at other times, one can sense that he is holding back . . . Relaxed tempi predominate to the point that the final selection, a way-up romp, comes as a positive relief. Why was it saved for that particular spot?" Morgenstern singled out contributions by Cootie Williams, Paul Gonsalves, and Johnny Hodges. He highly praised track 4 writing, "Indian Summer is the album's masterpiece, and one of Sinatra's most impressive efforts in recent years. The mood is bittersweet, the reeds add lovely touches, Ellington makes the most of his keyboard presence, and Hodges' touching solo is a perfect extension of the mood set by the singer. This one makes the whole venture worth the effort".

== Track listing ==
1. "Follow Me" (Alan Jay Lerner, Frederick Loewe) – 3:56
2. "Sunny" (Bobby Hebb) – 4:15
3. "All I Need Is the Girl" (Stephen Sondheim, Jule Styne) – 5:01
4. "Indian Summer" (Victor Herbert, Al Dubin) – 4:14
5. "I Like the Sunrise" (Duke Ellington) (from Ellington's Liberian Suite (1947)) – 5:02
6. "Yellow Days" (Álvaro Carrillo, Alan Bernstein) – 5:00
7. "Poor Butterfly" (Raymond Hubbell, John Golden) – 4:29
8. "Come Back to Me" (Burton Lane, Lerner) – 3:22

== Personnel ==
- Frank Sinatra - vocals
- Billy May - arranger, conductor
- Duke Ellington - piano
- Cootie Williams - trumpet
- Cat Anderson - trumpet
- Jimmy Hamilton - clarinet, tenor saxophone
- Paul Gonsalves - tenor saxophone
- Johnny Hodges - alto saxophone
- Russell Procope - alto saxophone, clarinet
- Harry Carney - baritone saxophone
- Lawrence Brown - trombone
- Jeff Castleman - double bass
- Sam Woodyard - drums

Among others, non-credited.

- Sonny Burke - producer
- Lee Herschberg - engineer
- Ed Thrasher - art direction

Complete personnel: Cat Anderson, Herbie Jones, Cootie Williams, Mercer Ellington, Al Porcino (tpt); Buster Cooper, Lawrence Brown, Chuck Connors (tbn); Johnny Hodges (alt); Russell Procope (alt/clt); Jimmy Hamilton (ten/clt); Paul Gonsalves (ten); Harry Camey (bar/b-clt); Bill Miller, Duke Ellington, Jimmy Jones (p); Jeffrey Castleman (b); Sam Woodyard (d). Billy May (arr/cond).

Tracks 3, 4, 6, 8:

Recorded 11-December-1967 (Monday) - Hollywood. Western Recorders (from I to 6 P.M.).

Tracks 1, 2, 7, 5:

Recorded 12-December-1967 (Tuesday) - Hollywood. Western Recorders (from I to 5 P.M.).
