= Composite film =

Film whose screenplay is composed of two or more distinct stories

In cinematography a composite film is a feature film whose screenplay is composed of two or more distinct stories. More generally, composite structure refers to an aesthetic principle in which the narrative structure relies on contiguity and linking rather than linearity. In a composite text or film, individual pieces are complete within themselves, yet they form a whole work that is greater than the sum of its individual parts.

The term "composite film" is more commonly used, in materials science, to describe thin films of material containing two or more layers or phases.

== History ==
The history of composite films begins with composite novels. The composite novel is a literary work composed of shorter texts that—though individually complete and autonomous—are interrelated in a coherent whole according to one or more organizing principles.

Although the composite-text aesthetic can be traced back through framework-stories (such as the One Thousand and One Nights and The Canterbury Tales), story cycles (such as the Arthurian stories), and sacred composites (such as the Bible), composite texts had specific precursors in the village sketch of nineteenth century Europe and America. Reflecting its roots in the framework-story and/or the cycle, a typical village sketch may feature an introductory story and a summary story, with individually titled internal stories that do not necessarily depend upon specific sequencing.

Twentieth century experimentation with the composite whole-text aesthetic, i.e., combining individual short stories into a whole-text narrative, began with James Joyce's Dubliners and Sherwood Anderson's Winesburg, Ohio and accelerated thereafter, but the composite novel remained controversial among readers, reviewers, and critics. Some wanted to call these works "novels" while others wanted to call them "collections". To their authors, however, these works were clearly not just collections of stories. Joyce insisted that Dubliners was a planned, integrated whole text. William Faulkner fought both publishers and critics over the whole-text coherence of Go Down, Moses, refusing to append "And Other Stories" to the book's title. Later, Maxine Hong Kingston and Tim O'Brien would wage similar battles over The Woman Warrior: Memoirs of a Childhood Among Ghosts (1976) and The Things They Carried (1990), respectively. By the end of the twentieth century, authors were announcing their whole-text intentions by insisting on such sub-titles as "A Novel in Stories", or simply "A Novel".

Composite novels have been referred to as a number of other genre-names including short story cycle, framed miscellany, multi-faceted novel, story-novel, short story blend, double-novel, short story compound, short story composite, composite, anthology novel, para novel, triptych, mosaic novel, loose-leaf novel, and short story sequence.

== Titles ==
Within a composite film, the individual stories may or may not be titled. Most highly integrated composite films, such as Love Actually, Traffic etc., do not have individually titled components while more traditional composite films, such as Paris, je t'aime, Coffee & Cigarettes, Things You Can Tell Just by Looking at Her, Pulp Fiction etc., do. Titling each component reinforces its autonomy and helps viewers experience it both individually and as part of the whole film.

== Unifying elements ==
Many different devices are used to connect the individual stories to each other and to the film in its entirety. Unifying elements include repeated images (such as coffee cups and ash trays in Coffee & Cigarettes), recurring characters (the women within Things You Can Tell Just by Looking at Her appear in at least one story other than their own), shared incidents (drug addiction in Requiem for a Dream), common settings (the dark streets of Sin City), similar themes (the three women of The Hours), a single protagonist (Tommy in The Fountain), collective protagonists (a group of people like generations of a family, coworkers, a club etc.), etc.

== Story sequencing ==
The sequence in which the individual stories unfold is often significant to the overall meaning of the film. Component pieces can be arranged in a number of different ways (chronologically, thematically, geographically etc.) and each method produces different results.

== Composite film scores ==
In regards to issues with connectivity, it is important to consider the musical score of composite films. Much like visual repetition or thematic similarities, the score offers another medium through which stories can be linked. Rather than leaving viewers with content to process, decode, intellectualize and then react to, the film score can produce emotional reactions immediately, before viewers have a chance to analyze their own responses. There are three main categories of composite film scores:

=== Unified score ===
In a unified score, there is no discernible difference between the music playing during each story segment. For example, in Sin City, the highly stylized background music offers ambiance and contributes to the setting and does not vary between characters and stories. In Love Actually, pop music blares through happy moments, ballads wail during morose moments, and triumphant strings swell when all things are as they should be.

=== Composite score ===
In a composite score, the music within each individual segment is independent and distinct from the music within other segments. For example, in Paris, je t'aime, each titled piece is accompanied by music that relates only to that single piece rather than the film as a whole. In this example, rather than linking the story lines, the music serves to further distinguish each neighborhood from the others.

=== Theme and variation ===
Theme and variation refers to a main theme that varies slightly by story segment. For example, in The Fountain, one main theme appears in each character's story, but there are also variations on that theme specific to those individual characters (tribal drums accompany the conquistador in Mayan territory, etc.). In Things You Can Tell Just by Looking at Her, the main theme throughout the film consists of somber classical guitar and accompanying piano, but within each individually titled segment, there are minor differences. Sultry horns are added to the banker's scenes, as she is having an affair, and as the detective investigates the death of her Hispanic friend, the music takes on a subtle Latin sound, etc.

== List of composite films ==
- Aayitha Ezhuthu
- Amores Perros
- A River Named Titas
- Babel
- Barbarian
- Before The Rain
- City of God
- Cloud Atlas
- Coffee & Cigarettes
- Crash
- Darna Mana Hai
- Darna Zaroori Hai
- The Dress
- Eternal Sunshine of the Spotless Mind
- Everything You Always Wanted to Know About Sex* (*But Were Afraid to Ask)
- The Five Senses
- The Fountain
- Four Rooms
- Go
- Grindhouse
- The Hours
- Invitation to the Dance
- Kanchenjungha
- Ken Park
- Kids
- Lock, Stock and Two Smoking Barrels
- Love Actually
- Magnolia
- Me and You and Everyone We Know
- Midaq Alley
- Mumbai Meri Jaan
- Mystery Train
- Nashville
- New York Stories
- Nine Lives
- Paris, je t'aime
- Personal Velocity
- Pulp Fiction
- The Red Violin
- Requiem for a Dream
- The Rules of Attraction
- A Scanner Darkly
- Sarvam
- Short Cuts
- Sin City
- Snatch
- Things You Can Tell Just by Looking at Her
- Thirteen Conversations About One Thing
- Thirty Two Short Films About Glenn Gould
- Three Colors trilogy
- Three Sisters
- Traffic
- Trio
- Twenty Bucks
- 21 Grams
- Waking Life
- Weapons
- Vada Chennai
- The Yellow Rolls-Royce

== See also ==
- Anthology film
