= Movie Greats of the 60s =

Studio album by Connie Francis
- Released: July 1966
- Recorded: March 24, 1965; September 25, 1965; December 8, 1965; March 15–16, 1966; April 19–20, 1966; May 31, 1966
- Genre: Pop
- Labels: MGM; E-4382 (mono)/SE-4382 (stereo)
- Producer: Tom Wilson

Connie Francis chronology
Jealous Heart (1966)	Movie Greats of the 60s (1966)	Connie's Christmas (1966)

Singles from Movie Greats of the 60s
- 1. "Forget Domani" Released: May 1965

Movie Greats of the 60s is a studio album recorded by American entertainer Connie Francis. The album features songs from the soundtracks of then current and/or recent motion pictures.

== Background ==
The recording of the featured songs spanned a period of more than a year, beginning with the March 24, 1965 recording of "Forget Domani": the album's most recently recorded track was "Somewhere, My Love (Lara's Theme)" recorded on May 31, 1966. During the sessions, Francis worked with several renowned arrangers and orchestra leaders such as Frank De Vol, Benny Golson and Don Costa.

The album was released in July 1966 as MGM Records 12" album E-4382 (mono pressings) and SE-4382 (stereo pressings).

In May 1967, Francis used the instrumental playbacks of nine of the album's featured songs and overdubbed Spanish vocals. "Dance My Trouble Away", "I Will Wait for You", and "The Phoenix Love Theme (Senza fine)" were omitted and not re-recorded in Spanish. By adding "Donde hay chicos" (already recorded in 1960), the Spanish version of "Where the Boys Are", the title song from Francis' own film of the same name, a set of ten Spanish songs was compiled and released in July 1967 as a 12" album under the name Grandes exitos del cine de los años 60. With an identical cover design, Grandes exitos del cine de los años 60 was virtually the Spanish edition of Movie Greats of the 60s with a slightly modified track listing.

== Chart performance ==
The album debuted on Record World's albums chart on September 27, 1966, peaking at No. 130 during a seven-week run. Notably, the album did not chart on the other two major US music magazines.

== Reception ==
Record World reviewed the album and put it in its "Pick Hits" section, writing "Recent vintage Hollywood tunes are Connie's interest on this package. She warbles "Strangers in the Night," "Call Me Irresponsible," "You're Gonna Hear From Me," "The Shadow of Your Smile," "Forget Domani," "Somewhere, My Love."" The magazine also notes that it "will sell".

== Track listing ==
=== Side A ===
No.	Title	Writer(s)	From the Motion Picture	Length
1.	"Strangers in the Night"	Bert Kaempfert / Charles Singleton / Eddie Snyder	A Man Could Get Killed (1966)	3:02
2.	"Call Me Irresponsible"	Jimmy Van Heusen / Sammy Cahn	Papa's Delicate Condition (1963)	2:11
3.	"I Will Wait for You"	Michel Legrand / Jacques Demy / Norman Gimbel	The Umbrellas of Cherbourg (1964)	3:05
4.	"You're Gonna Hear from Me"	André Previn	Inside Daisy Clover (1965)	2:30
5.	"The Second Time Around"	Jimmy Van Heusen / Sammy Cahn	High Time (1960)	2:22
6.	"Somewhere, My Love (Lara's Theme)"	Maurice Jarre / Paul Francis Webster	Doctor Zhivago (1965)	2:57

=== Side B ===
No.	Title	Writer(s)	From the Motion Picture	Length
7.	"Dance My Trouble Away"	Mikis Theodorakis	Zorba the Greek (1964)	3:18
8.	"The Shadow of Your Smile"	Johnny Mandel / Paul Francis Webster	The Sandpiper (1965)	2:54
9.	"Wives and Lovers"	Burt Bacharach / Hal David	Wives and Lovers (1963)	2:56
10.	"The Good Life"	Sacha Distel / Jack Reardon	The Seven Deadly Sins (1962)	3:32
11.	"The Phoenix Love Theme (Senza fine)"	Gino Paoli / Norman Newell	The Flight of the Phoenix (1965)	3:10
12.	"Forget Domani"	Riz Ortolani / Norman Newell	The Yellow Rolls-Royce (1965)	2:39
