= Happiness – Connie Francis On Broadway Today =

Studio album by Connie Francis
- Released: May 1967
- Recorded: March 22, 1967; March 24, 1967; March 27, 1967
- Genre: Pop, Soundtrack album
- Label: MGM
- Producer: Pete Spargo

Connie Francis chronology
Love, Italian Style (1967)	Happiness – Connie Francis On Broadway Today (1967)	Grandes Exitos del Cine de los Años 60 (1967)

Happiness – Connie Francis On Broadway Today is a studio album recorded by American entertainer Connie Francis. The album features signature songs from the soundtracks of then current and/or recent Broadway musicals.

The album was recorded in March 1967 in New York.

== Reception ==
Record World put it in its "Albums of the Week" section, along with two other albums, writing, "Connie Francis is coming up 'Happiness' on this package as she strolls down Broadway and sings 'Cabaret,' 'Sherry,' etc."

== Track listing ==
=== Side A ===
#	Title	Songwriter	Length	from the musical
1.	"Happiness"	Clark Gesner	3.02	"You're A Good Man, Charlie Brown"
2.	"Together Forever/My Cup Runneth Over" (Medley)	Harvey Schmidt, Tom Jones	3.15	"I Do! I Do!"
3.	"Hallelujah, Baby"	Jule Styne, Adolph Green, Betty Comden	2.38	"Hallelujah, Baby!"
4.	"Willkommen & Cabaret" (Medley)	John Kander, Fred Ebb	2.50	"Cabaret"
5.	"Fiddler on the Roof/To Life (L'chaim)" (Medley)	Jerry Bock, Sheldon Harnick	2.02	"Fiddler on the Roof"
6.	"Walking Happy"	Jimmy Van Heusen, Sammy Cahn	2.26	"Walking Happy"

=== Side B ===
#	Title	Songwriter	Length	from the musical
1.	"Illya Darling"	Manos Hadjidakis, Joe Darion	2.33	"Illya Darling"
2.	"If They Could See Me Now/I'm A Brass Band" (Medley)	Cy Coleman, Dorothy Fields	2.50	"Sweet Charity"
3.	"Sherry"	Laurence Rosenthal, James Lipton	2.45	"Sherry!"
4.	"I Wanna Be With You"	Charles Strouse, Lee Adams	3.06	"Golden Boy"
5.	"My Best Beau"	Jerry Herman	2.37	"Mame"
6.	"The Impossible Dream"	Mitch Leigh, Joe Darion	3.01	"Man of La Mancha"
