= Rolls-Royce Phantom II =

Ultra-luxury flagship automobile in its second generation

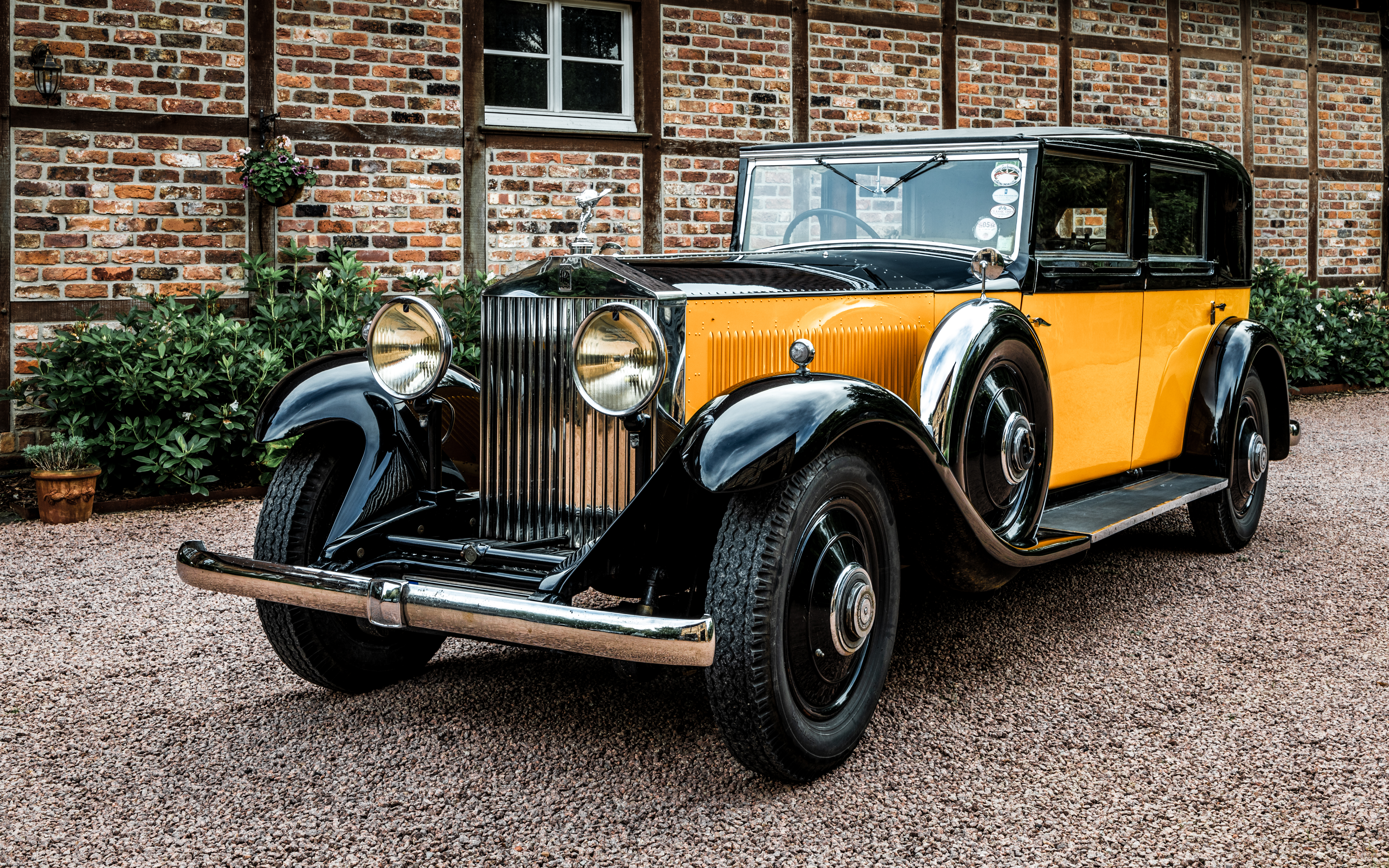

Overview
- Manufacturer: Rolls-Royce Ltd
- Production: 1929–1935; 1,681 produced 1,400 "regular" cars 281 Continentals 9 experimental cars
- Assembly: United Kingdom: Derby, England

Body and chassis
- Class: Luxury car

Powertrain
- Engine: 7668 cc I6
- Transmission: 4-speed manual

Dimensions
- Wheelbase: 144 in (3658 mm); 150 in (3810 mm)

Chronology
- Predecessor: Phantom I
- Successor: Phantom III

The Rolls-Royce Phantom II was the third and last of Rolls-Royce's 40/50 hp models, replacing the New Phantom in 1929. It used an improved version of the New Phantom engine in an all-new chassis. A "Continental" version, with a short wheelbase and stiffer springs, was offered.

== Description ==
=== Drivetrain ===
The Phantom II used a refinement of the New Phantom's 7.7 L (7,668 cc or 467.9 cu in) pushrod-OHV straight-6 engine with a new crossflow cylinder head. Unlike on previous 40/50 hp models, the engine was bolted directly to the 4-speed manual transmission. Synchromesh was added on gears 3 and 4 in 1932 and on gear 2 in 1935. Power was transmitted to the rear wheels using an open driveshaft, a hypoid bevel final drive, and Hotchkiss drive, replacing the torque tube from a remotely mounted gearbox used on earlier 40/50 hp models.

=== Chassis ===
The chassis of the Phantom II was completely new. The front axle was mounted on semi-elliptical leaf springs as on earlier 40/50 hp models, but the rear axle was now also mounted on semi-elliptical springs instead of cantilever springs. This, along with the drivetrain changes, allowed the frame to be lower than before, improving the handling. The 4-wheel servo-assisted brakes from the Phantom I were continued, and the Bijur centralized lubrication system from the Springfield-built Phantom I was included on all Phantom II chassis.

The standard wheelbase of the Phantom II was 150 inches (3,800 mm). A 144 inches (3,700 mm) short-wheelbase chassis was also available.

A total of 1,681 Phantom II chassis of all types were built.

=== "Continental" model ===
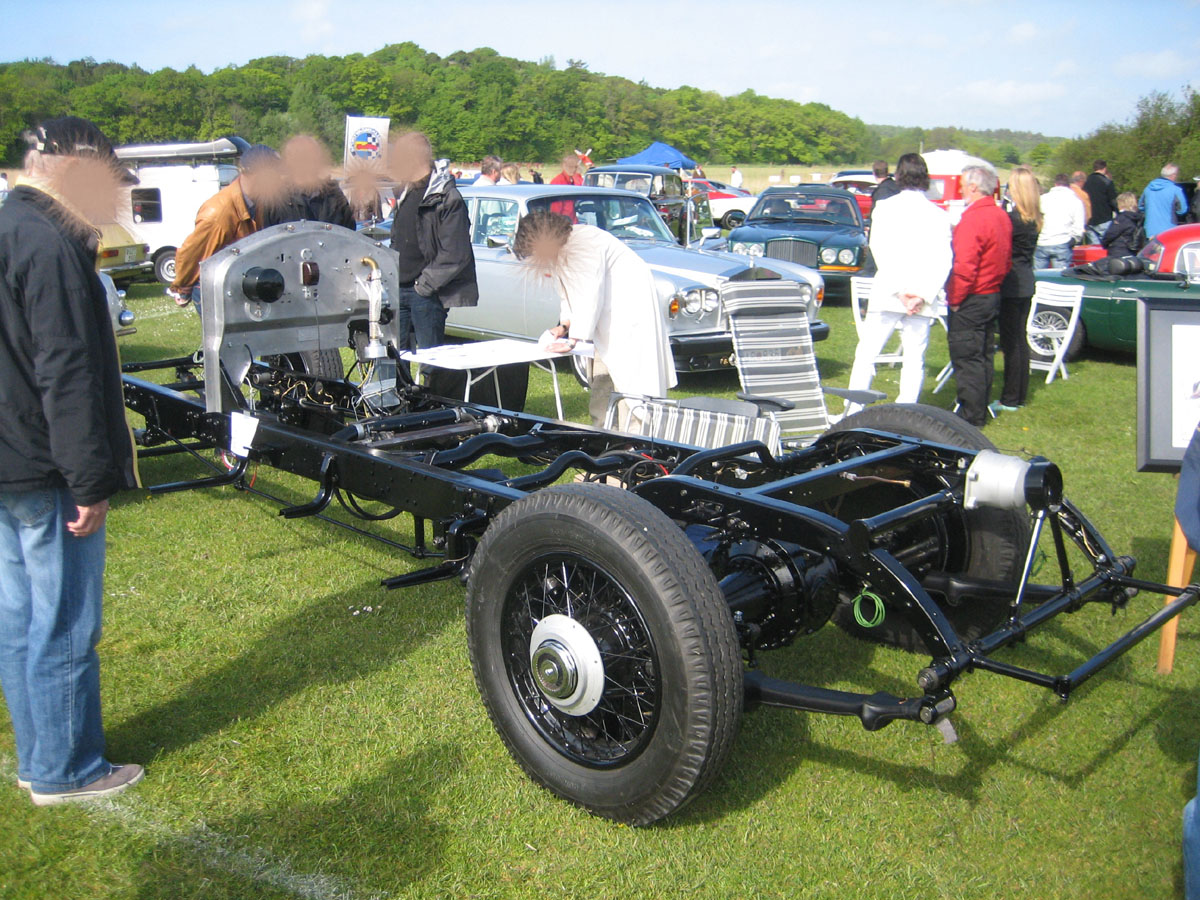
Rolls-Royce Phantom II frame

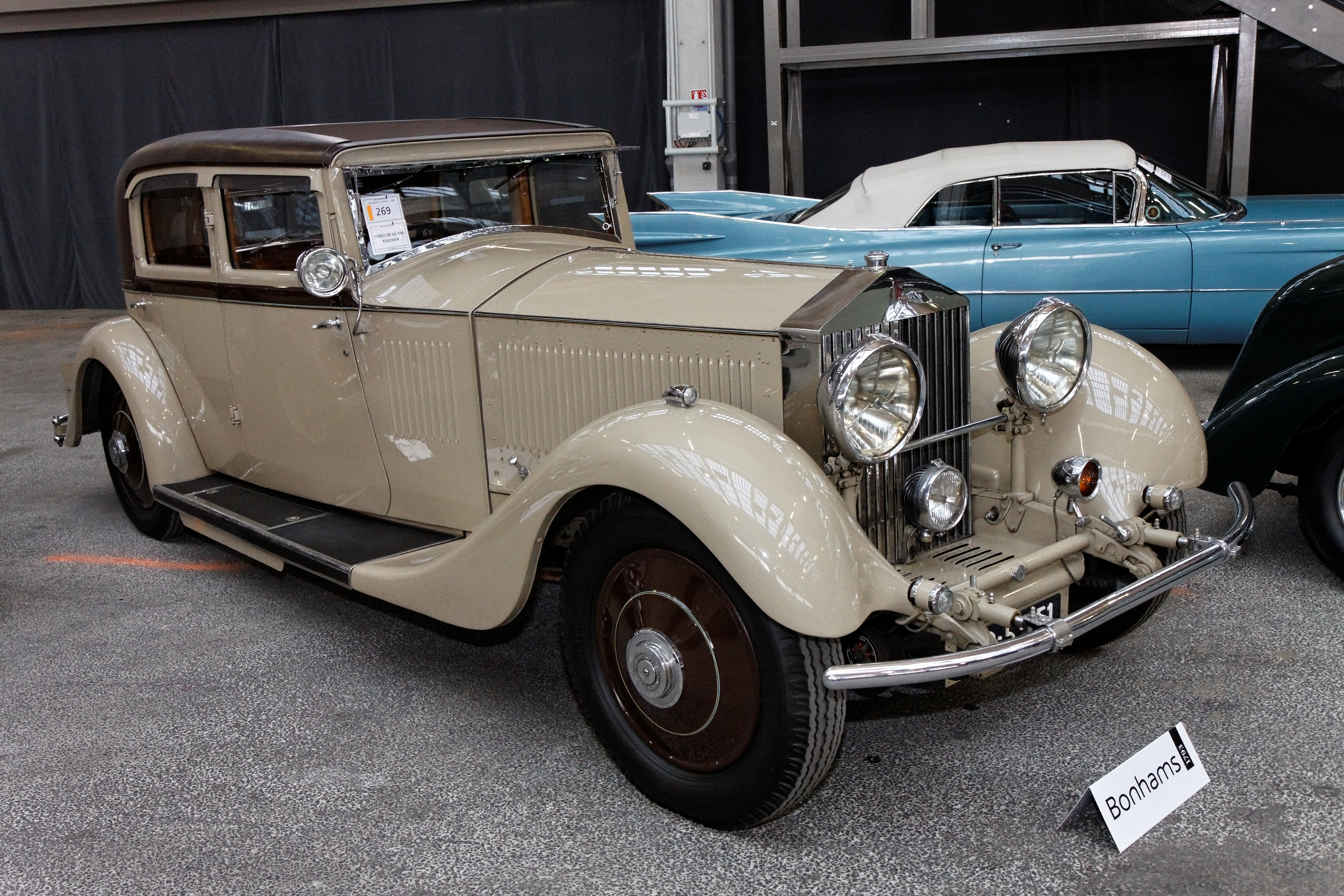
Rolls-Royce 40-50hp Phantom II 'Continental' Sports Saloon

Henry Royce had body designer Ivan Evernden design him a one-off short-wheelbase Phantom II. Designated 26EX, the car had a tuned engine, five-leaf springs that were stiffer than standard and a Barker four-seat lightweight close-coupled saloon body painted with an artificial pearl lacquer made from ground herring scales. The sales department initially showed no interest in 26EX but, when Evernden returned to the office from the 1930 Biarritz Grand Concours d'Elegance, where 26EX had won the Grand Prix d'Honneur, he found that the sales department had already announced the new "Phantom II Continental Saloon", prepared a brochure for it, and costed it.

According to Evernden, neither he, Royce, nor the Rolls-Royce sales department had written specifications for the "Continental" model, although he and Royce had a clear specification in mind. Based on Evernden's writings and examination of company records, historian Ray Gentile determined that the common specifications of the Continental chassis were the short wheelbase and stiffer, five-leaf springs. By this definition, two hundred and eighty-one Continental Phantom II's were produced, including 125 left-hand drive versions.

Regarded as the two most important P-II Continentals are 20MS and 2SK, the only two P-II Continental Roadsters ever built. 20MS has been in a private Mid-Atlantic collection since 1989, 2SK, the Thrupp and Maberly Roadster once owned by Tyrone Power, was in the Fred Buess collection since 1958 but was sold at auction in 2010. Most Continentals were sports saloons, but various body styles were produced on the Continental chassis, including formal sedanca de villes, sporting open roadsters, and closed coupes meant for long-distance touring. Most were bodied by British coachbuilders, such as Barker, Hooper, H.J. Mulliner and Windovers, but various other coachbuilders in Europe, Australia and the United States built bodies for the Continentals, including Kellner of Paris, Martin & King of Sydney, and Brewster of New York City.

=== US-market versions ===
All Phantom II rolling chassis were built at Rolls-Royce's factory in Derby. The factory in Springfield, Massachusetts was closed upon ending production of the US-market Phantom I/New Phantom in 1931. Two US-market series, AJS and AMS, were built at Derby.

It competed with the recently introduced Lincoln Model K, Chrysler Imperial, Mercedes-Benz 770, Duesenberg Model J, Packard Eight, and the Cadillac Series 355. The left-hand-drive configuration was unsurprisingly most popular in the United States and Canada, but customers in Monaco, Denmark, Switzerland and Poland also purchased left-hand-drive chassis, which were not regularly available outside the USA.

== Bodywork ==
Only the chassis and mechanical parts were made by Rolls-Royce. The body was made and fitted by a coachbuilder selected by the owner. Some of the most famous coachbuilders who produced bodies for Rolls-Royce cars are Park Ward, Brewster, Thrupp & Maberly, Mulliner, Carlton, Windovers, and Hooper. Outside the UK, cars were bodied in Australia by Martin & King, Italy by Castagna, Spain by Baltasar Fiol, Germany by Erdmann und Rossi, Sweden by Nordberg, Belgium by Van den Plas (Bruxelles,) The Netherlands by Van Rijswijk, France by Saoutchik, Kellner, Binder and Gaston Grümmer, and the United States by Brewster and F.R. Wood.

== In popular culture ==
The Phantom II was featured in the films The Sorcerer's Apprentice and Indiana Jones and the Last Crusade. When its specifications are quoted during the scene in the Kingdom of Hatay, the Sultan states that the Rolls-Royce Phantom II has a "4.3 litre, 30 horsepower, six cylinder engine, with Stromberg downdraft carburetor; can go from zero to 100 kilometers an hour in 12.5 seconds (and I even like the color)." However, the car used in the film was actually a Rolls-Royce Barker Saloon, with 20/25 hp. It is also the star of the 1964 film The Yellow Rolls-Royce where its engine specifications are given as the engine having a bore of 4.5" and stroke of 5.5", which would equate to 525 cubic inches.

== Pocher Model Kits ==
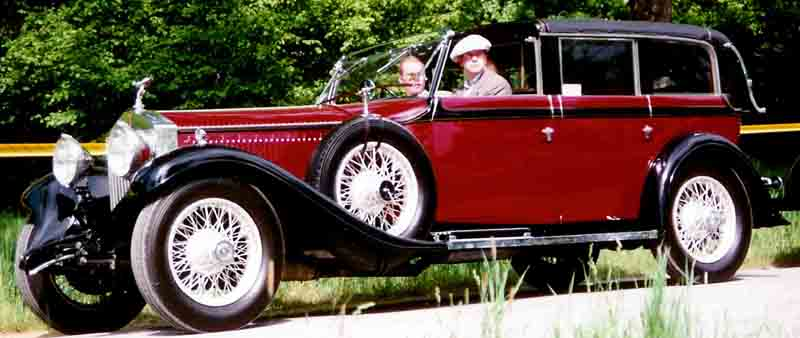
Rolls-Royce Phantom II Sedanca Cabriolet 1929

Pocher models are recognised as some of the most complex and detailed automobile kits ever made, and they released 2 1/8th scale museum level model kits of the Phantom II:

- Pocher Rolls-Royce Phantom II Sedanca Coupe 1932, 1:8
- Pocher Rolls-Royce Torpedo Phantom II Convertible with 2,905 parts

== Production ==
- Phantom II: 1400
- Phantom II Continental: 281
- Phantom II Experimental: 9

Total production: 1,681 total cars

== Gallery ==
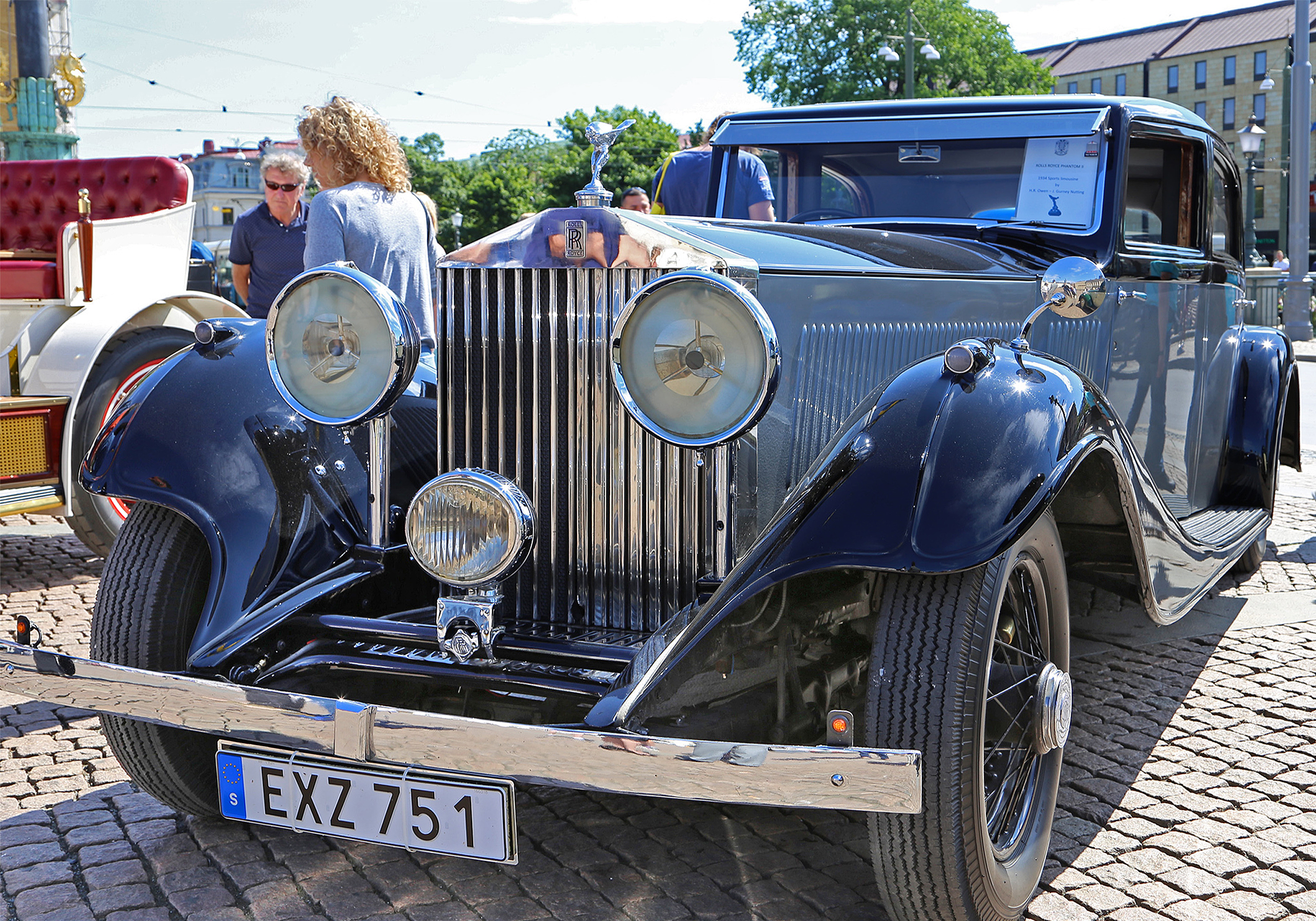
Rolls-Royce Phantom II pullman limousine

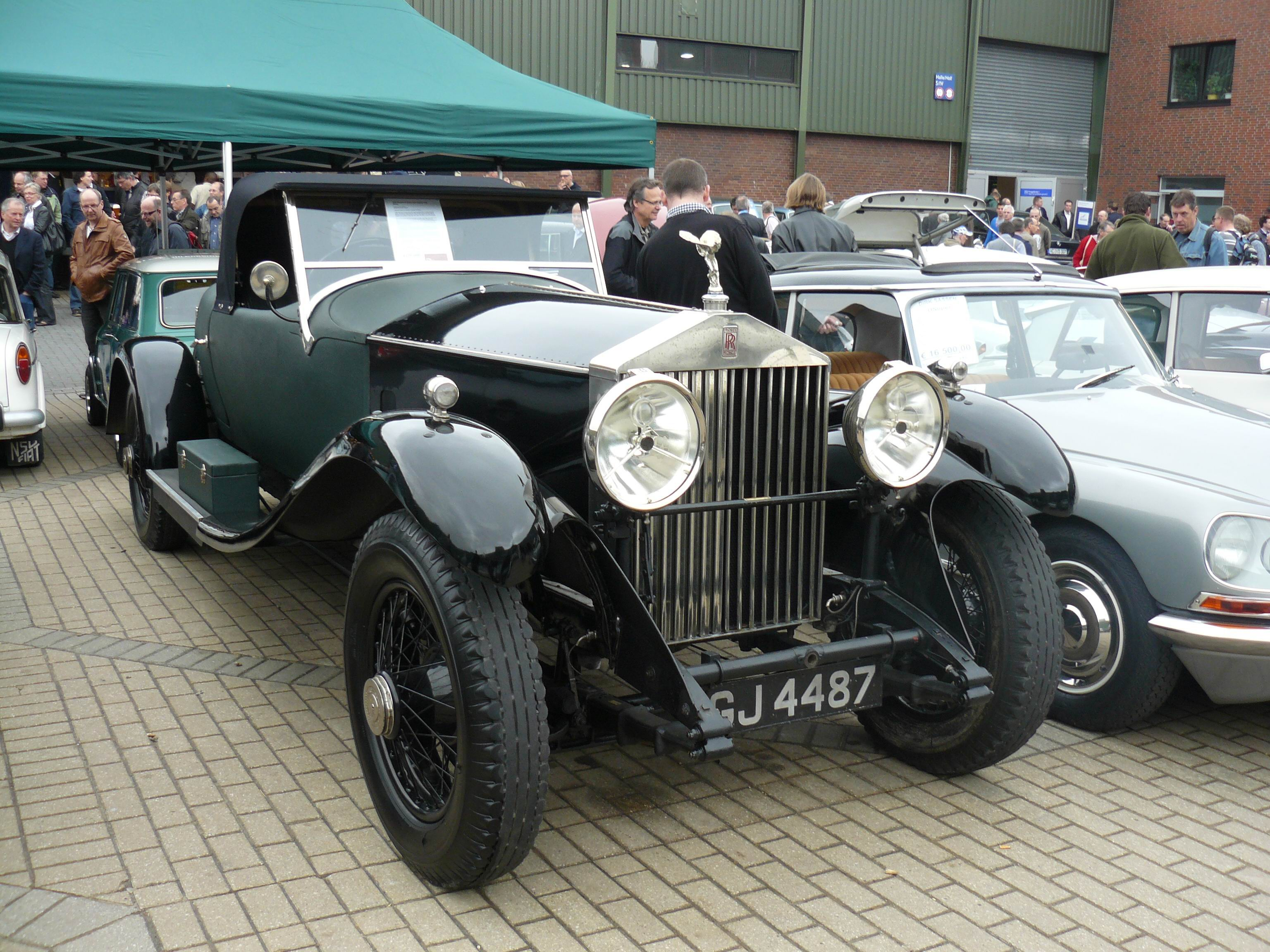
1930 Rolls-Royce Phantom II Kellner

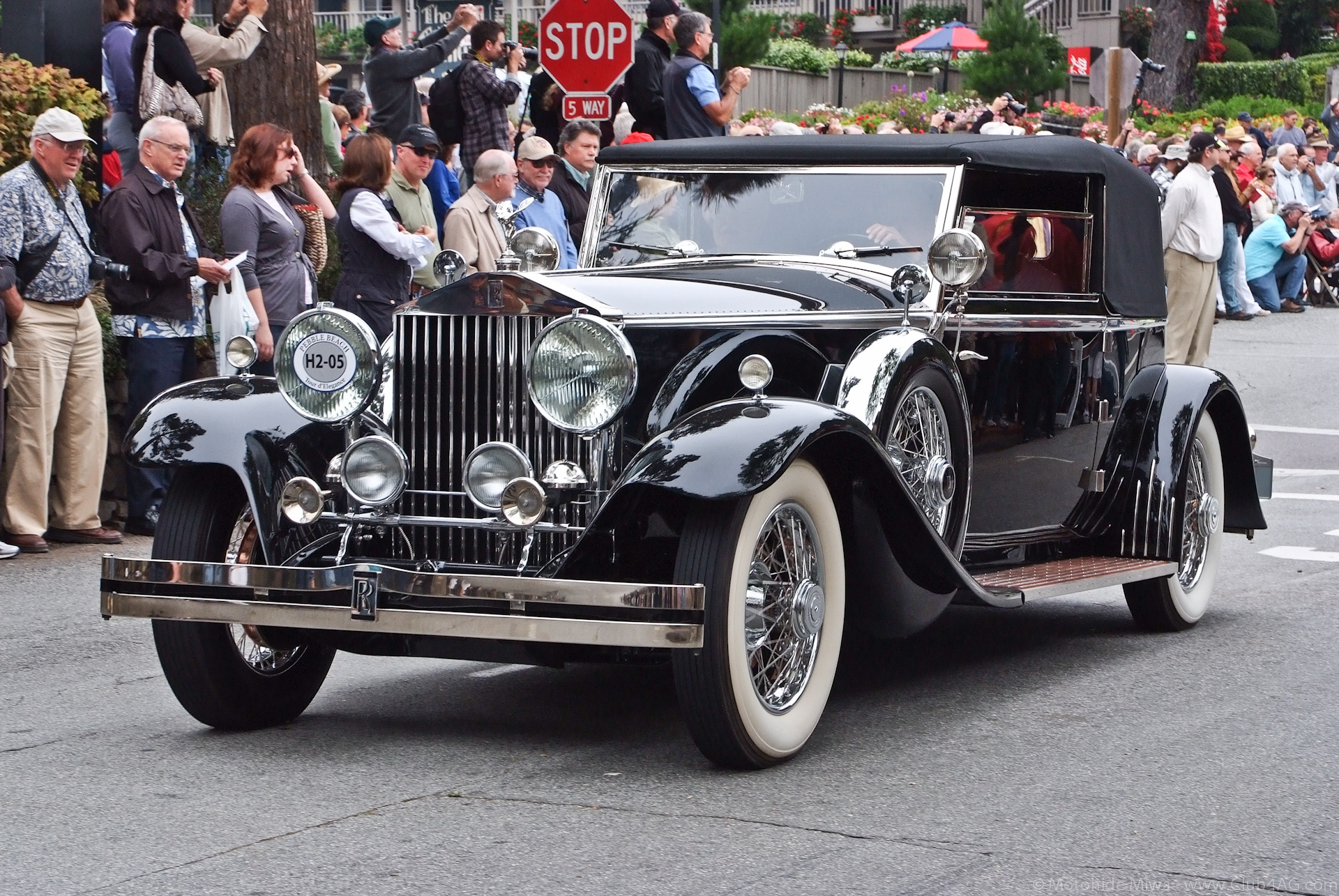
1932 Rolls-Royce Phantom II Brewster Croydon

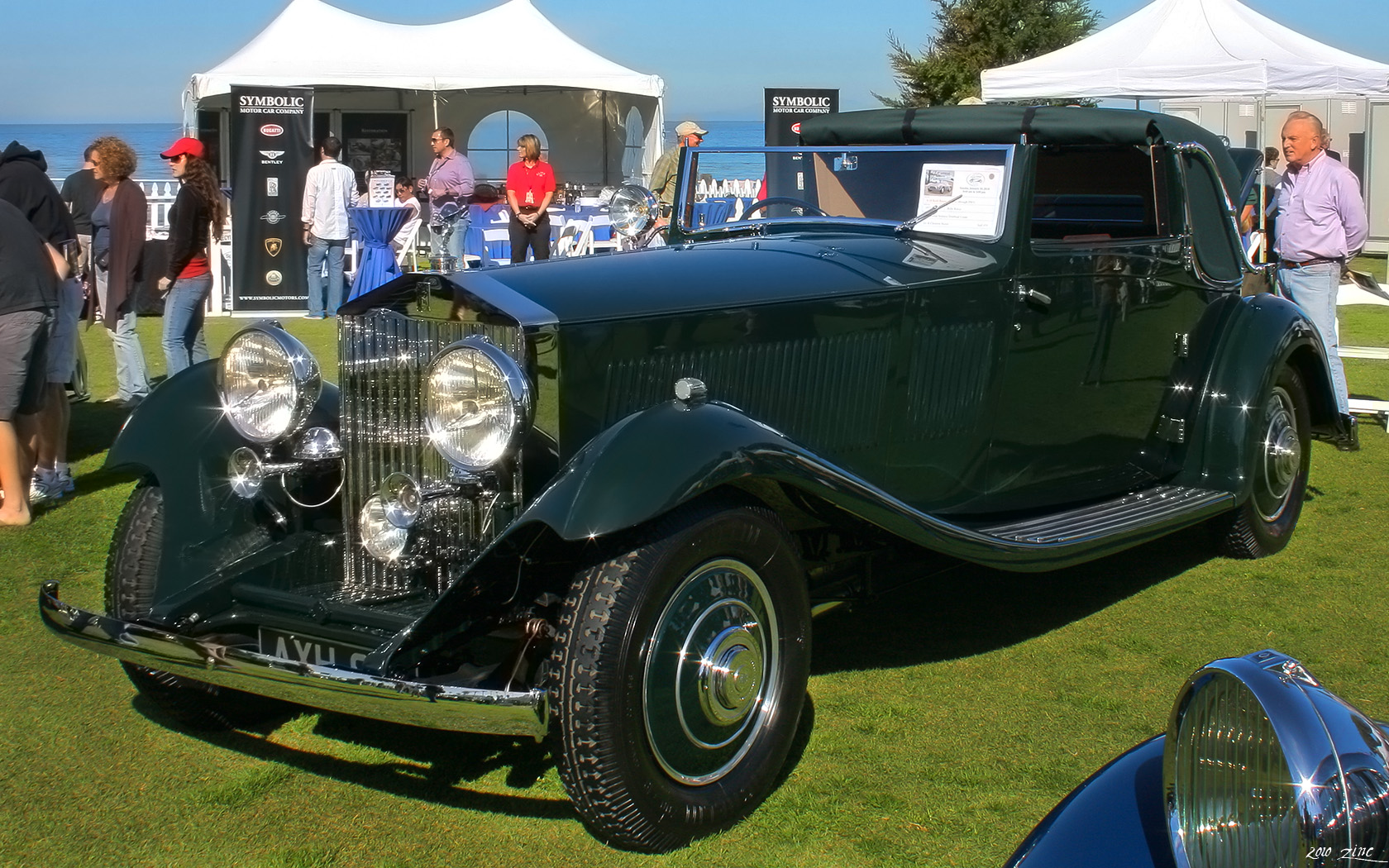
1933 Rolls Royce Phantom II Continental Gurney Nutting

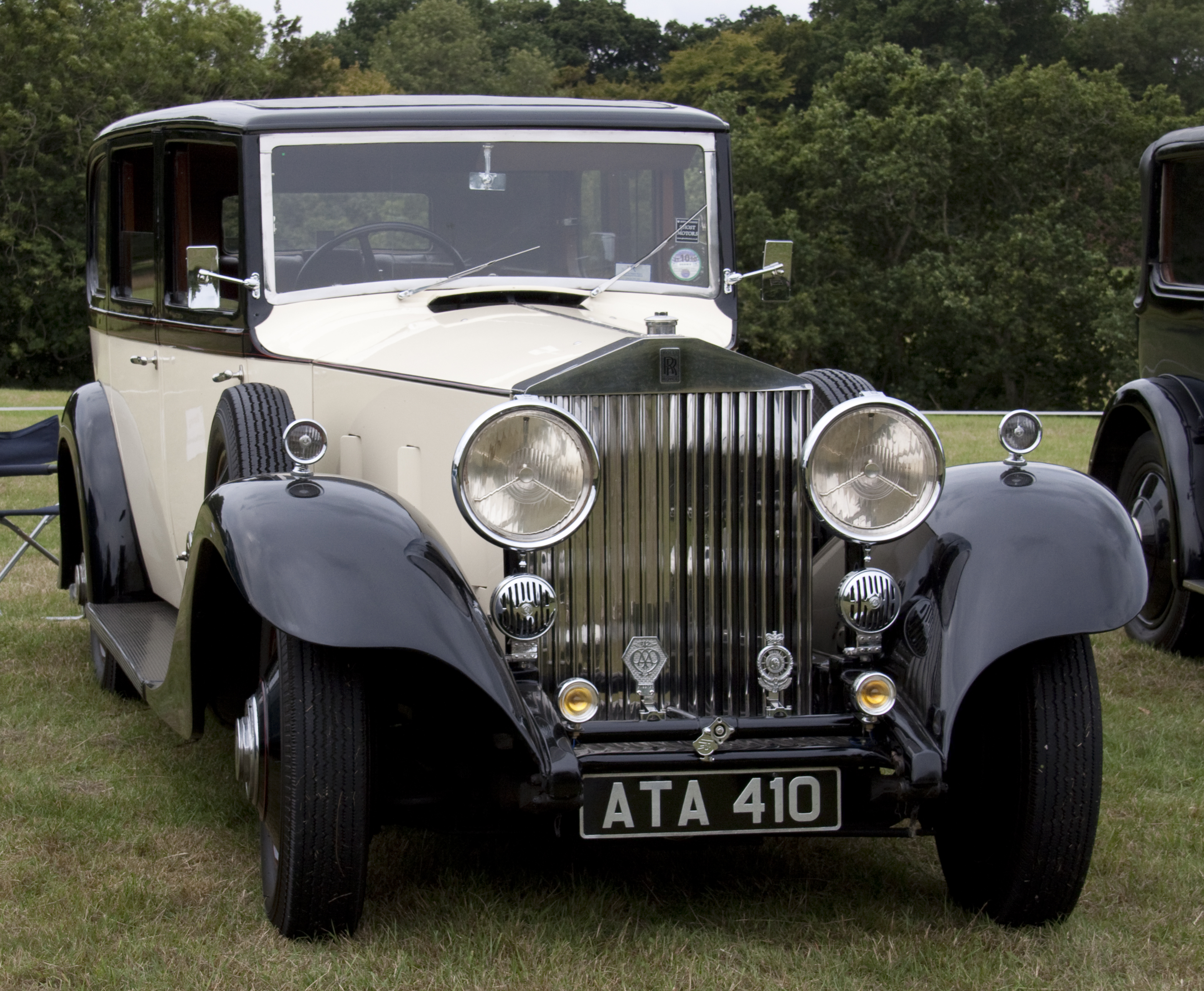
1934 Rolls-Royce Phantom II, Hooper limousine

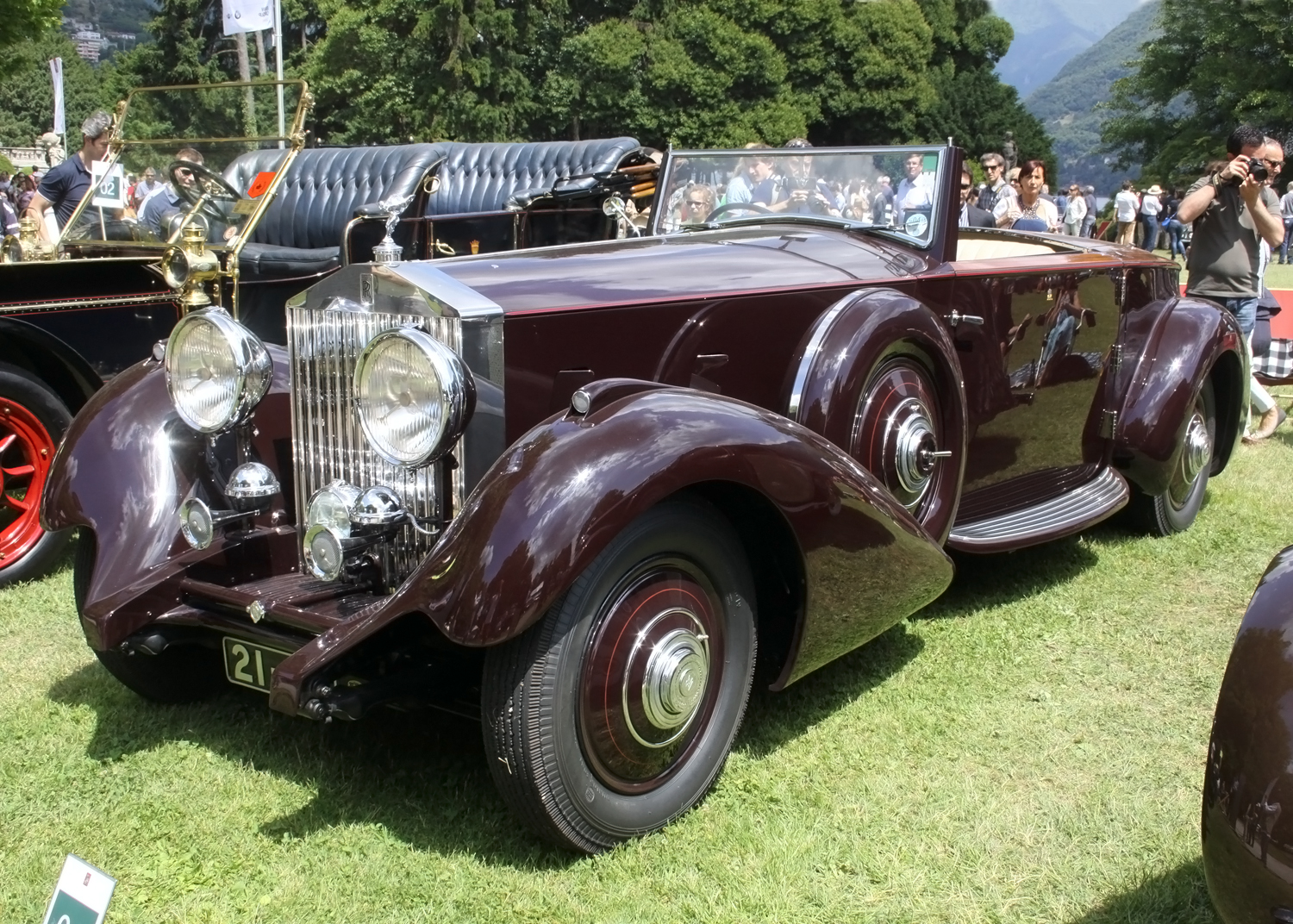
1934 Rolls Royce Phantom II Boattail Gurney Nutting

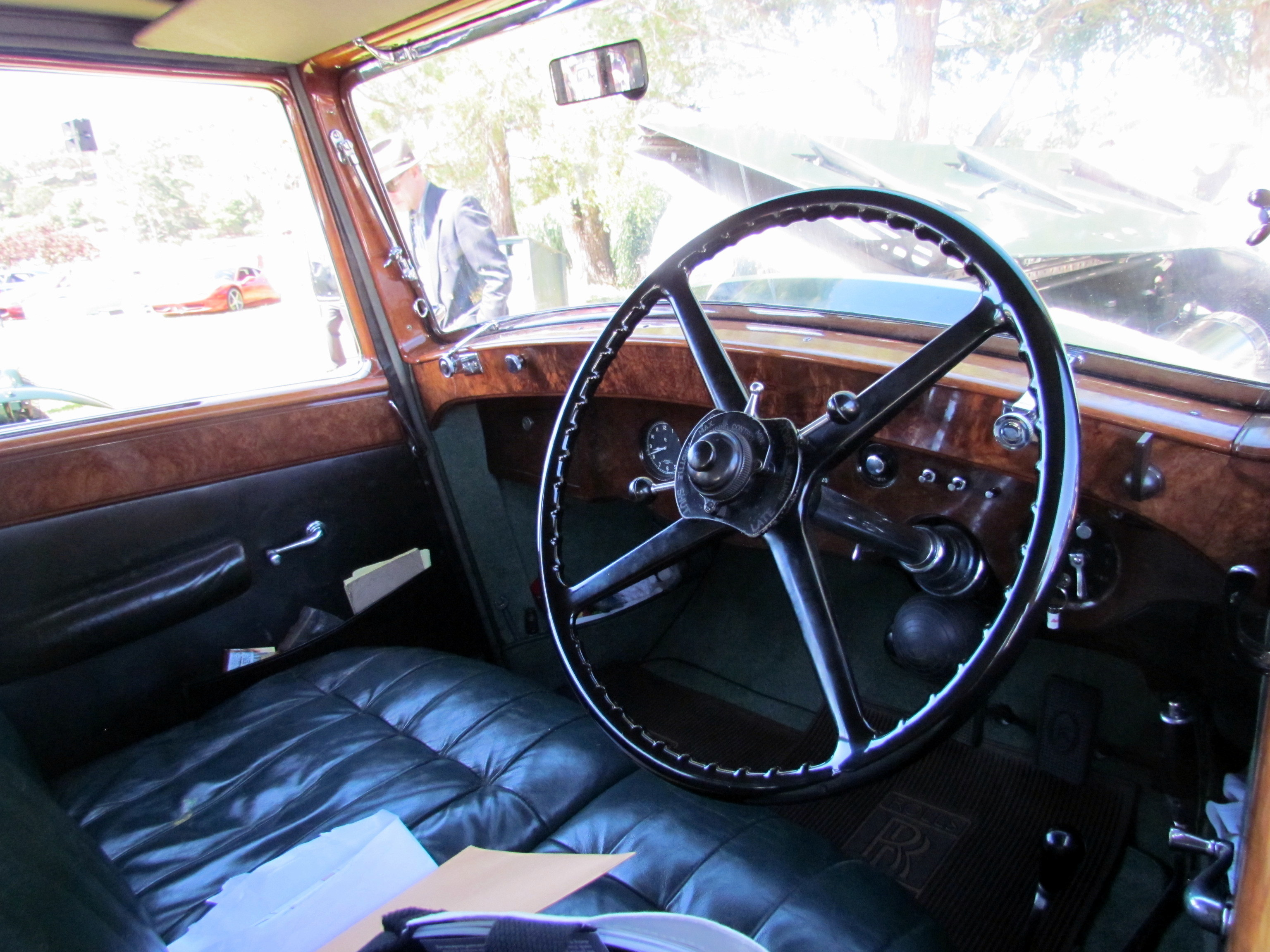
1934 Rolls-Royce Phantom II Limousine interior

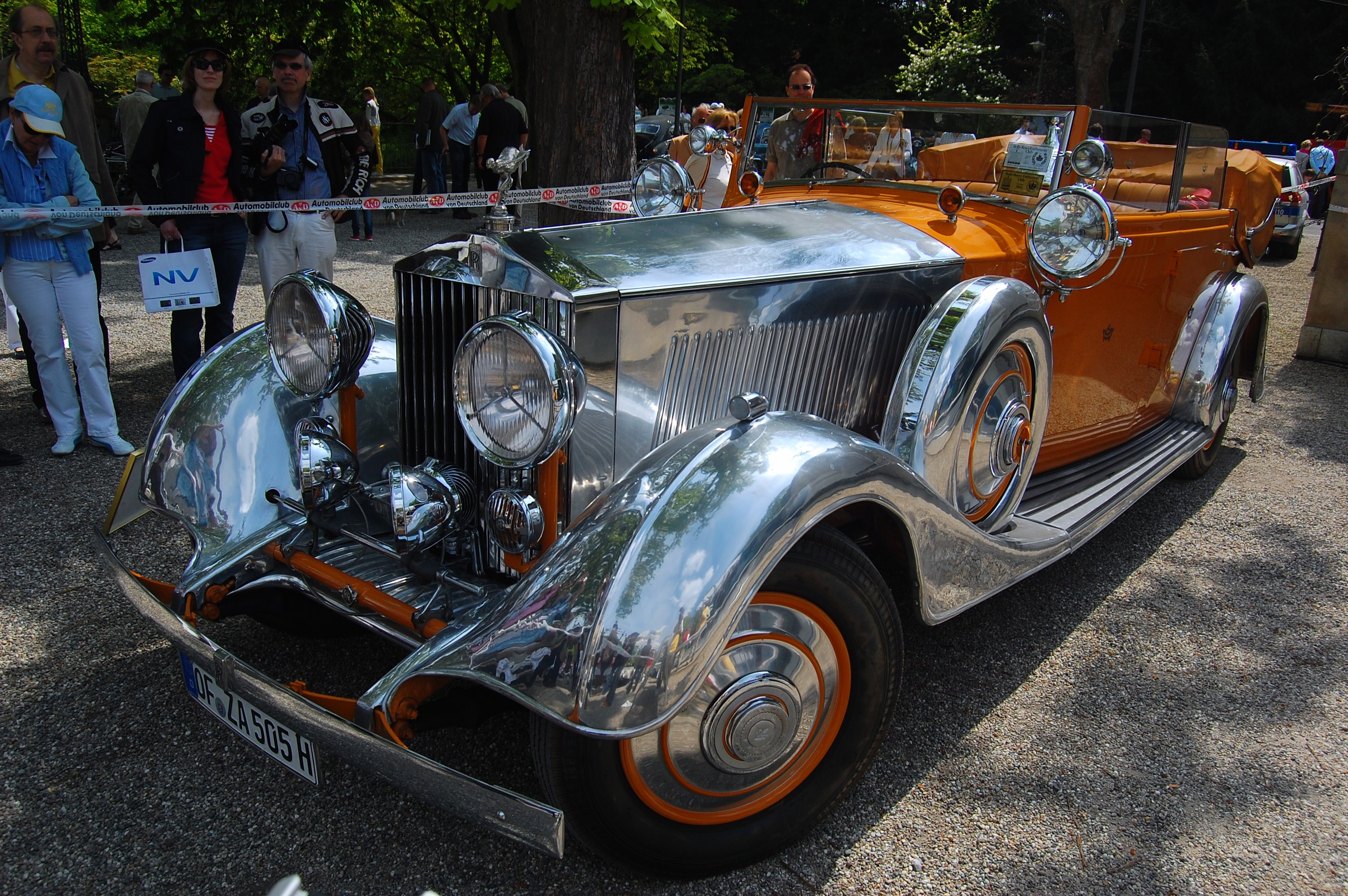
Rolls-Royce Phantom II with All-Weather Cabriolet coachwork by Thrupp & Maberly for the Maharajah of Rajkot, Chassis #188PY (1934). This car also is known as the "Star of India"

== See also ==
- Rolls-Royce Motors
- List of Rolls-Royce motor cars
