= Tie Me Kangaroo Down, Sport =

1957 song written by Rolf Harris

Single by Rolf Harris
- B-side: "The Big Black Hat"
- Written: 1957
- Released: 1960
- Recorded: 1960
- Genre: Folk, pop, comedy, novelty
- Length: 3:03 (original version); 2:42 (censored version)
- Label: Epic; Columbia
- Songwriter: Rolf Harris

Rolf Harris singles chronology
"Tie Me Kangaroo Down, Sport" (1960)	"Tame Eagle" (1961)

"Tie Me Kangaroo Down, Sport"

Song by the Wiggles featuring Rolf Harris

from the album It's a Wiggly Wiggly World
- Released: 20 March 2000
- Studio: Albert Studios, Sydney, Australia
- Genre: Children's
- Length: 1:38
- Label: ABC (AUS); Hit Entertainment (US); Koch (US)
- Songwriter: Rolf Harris
- Producer: The Wiggles

"Tie Me Kangaroo Down, Sport" is a song written by Australian singer Rolf Harris in 1957 which became a hit around the world in the 1960s in two recordings (1960 in Australia, New Zealand and the United Kingdom for the original, and 1963 in the United States with a re-recording of the song). Inspired by Harry Belafonte's calypsos, most noticeably "The Jack-Ass Song", it is about an Australian stockman on his deathbed.

Harris originally offered four unknown Australian backing musicians 10% of the royalties for the song in 1960 (*Double bass played by Brian Bursey), but they decided to take a recording fee of £7 each then because they thought the song would be a flop. The distinctive sound of Harris's original recording was achieved by the use of an instrument of his own design called the "wobble board"—a two-by-three-foot piece of hardboard.

The recording peaked at No. 1 in the Australian chart and was a top 10 hit in the UK in 1960. In 1963, Harris re-recorded the song in the UK with George Martin as producer, and this remake of the song reached No. 3 on the US Billboard Hot 100 chart and spent three weeks atop the Easy Listening chart in 1963. "Tie Me Kangaroo Down, Sport" was a surprise hit on the US R&B chart where it went to No. 19. The song reached No. 20 on the Canadian CHUM Chart.

The song was used by the WWF in the late 1980s as the theme song of enhancement talent wrestler Outback Jack. Other versions were recorded by Connie Francis (for her 1966 album Connie Francis and The Kids Next Door) and by Pat Boone. A version by the Brothers Four can be found on their CD The Brothers Four, Greatest Hits.

The song was also featured in a season 10 episode of the NBC sitcom Frasier titled "Farewell, Nervosa" and was sung by actor Elvis Costello.

== The story of the song ==
The opening recitation by Harris:

There's an old Australian stockman, lying, dying,
and he gets himself up on one elbow,
and he turns to his mates,
who are gathered 'round him and he says...

is similar to the first verse of a song, The Dying Stockman, collected in Australia by Banjo Paterson and published in 1905:

A strapping young stockman lay dying,
His saddle supporting his head;
His two mates around him were crying,
As he rose on his pillow and said...

In Harris' version, a dying Australian stockman instructs his friends to take care of his affairs after he is gone. The first of these is to watch his wallabies’ feed, then to tie his kangaroo down, since they jump around (which is the chorus). "Sport" is an Australian term of address, alluding to "good sport", which often, as in this case, praises someone for carrying out a small favour one is asking of them. The lyrics mention animals and objects associated with Australia, including cockatoos, koalas, platypuses, and didgeridoos. His last dying wish is "Tan me hide when I'm dead, Fred". By the end of the song, the stockman has died and his wish has been carried out: "So we tanned his hide when he died, Clyde, and that's it hanging on the shed".

== Deleted verse ==
"Tie Me Kangaroo Down, Sport" sheet music cover

The fourth verse caused some controversy in 1964 because of its use of the word "Abo", an offensive slang term for Aboriginal Australians. The lyrics of this verse (not found on Harris's official website) were as follows:

Let me Abos go loose, Lou
Let me Abos go loose:
They're of no further use, Lou
So let me Abos go loose.

The stockman thus emancipates his Indigenous offsiders at his death because they are "of no further use" to him. Fellow Australian Horrie Dargie objected to this verse and when he released his cover version in May 1960 Dargie deliberately removed the offensive lyrics. Dargie's rendition reached No. 34 on the Kent Music Report (back-calculated) Australian singles chart. This verse did not feature in Harris's 21st-century versions of the song and, in a 2006 interview, Harris expressed regret about the racist nature of the original lyrics.

== Performances by Harris ==
Many parodies, variations, and versions tailored for different countries exist of the song, and Harris performs excerpts from some of them on a 1969 live album released only in the UK called Rolf Harris Live at the Talk of the Town (EMI Columbia SCX 6313). He recorded a version with The Beatles on 18 December 1963 for the BBC programme From Us To You Say The Beatles in which each Beatle is included in the lyrics: "Don't ill-treat me pet dingo, Ringo"; "George's guitar's on the blink, I think"; "Prop me up by the wall Paul"; "Keep the hits coming on, John". In the final verse, the stockman's tanned hide is used to replace Ringo's drumheads. It was broadcast on 26 December.

Harris performed the song during the Opening Ceremony of the 1982 Commonwealth Games in Brisbane, Queensland, Australia, he removed all reference to aboriginals and explained, "It had no special overtones when it was written ... a stockman was dying and he wanted his Aboriginal helpers to be released from their employment commitments." To replace it a special verse of lyrics was written for the event; they are as follows:

Can I welcome you to the Games, friends,
Welcome you to the Games,
Look, I don't know all your names, friends,
But let me welcome you all to the Games.

== Covers ==
The song has been covered by numerous artists over the years

- Bjørn Tidmand, released as a single and translated to danish as: "Stop den lille kænguru"
- Horrie Dargie, as a single, "Tie Me Kangaroo Down Sport" (1960) – Aus: No. 34
- Pat Boone, on the album Tie Me Kangaroo Down Sport
- Slim Dusty, on the album Aussie Sing Song
- Ray Conniff, on the album Somewhere My Love
- The Brothers Four, on the album The Big Folk Hits
- The Wiggles, with Harris, on the album and video It's a Wiggly Wiggly World, and on the album Celebration. (The song was removed from all digital releases of said material following Harris' conviction.)
- The Beatles, the song was recorded by Rolf Harris, backed by The Beatles, on 18th December 1963 at the BBC's Paris Studios, and broadcast as part of the group's "From Us To You" on the BBC Light Programme on 26th December 1963. The songs from this performance have since been released on bootlegs.

The song was also referenced in the Australian horror movie Wolf Creek 2 during the torture scene.

== See also ==
- List of number-one singles in Australia during the 1960s
- List of number-one adult contemporary singles of 1963 (U.S.)
