= Connie Francis and The Kids Next Door =

Studio album by Connie Francis
- Released: October 1968
- Recorded: May 17–18, 1966; June 1, 1966
- Genre: Pop
- Label: Leo the Lion
- Producer: Pete Spargo

Connie Francis chronology
Connie Francis live at The Sahara in Las Vegas (1966)	Connie Francis and The Kids Next Door (1968)	Love, Italian Style (1967)

Connie Francis and The Kids Next Door is a studio album recorded by U. S. Entertainer Connie Francis.

== Background ==
Whilst the material of her album Connie Francis Sings Fun Songs for Children (1959) clearly had aimed at toddlers and smaller children of pre-school age, Connie Francis and The Kids Next Door contained material suitable for older children and youths in their early teens by combining classic songs such as Do-Re-Mi from the musical The Sound of Music with modern novelty songs like a rendition of Brian Hyland's 1960 hit Itsy Bitsy Teenie Weenie Yellow Polka Dot Bikini.

The orchestral backing track and the vocal contributions of an unidentified children choir were recorded on May 17 and 18, 1966. Francis overdubbed her vocals to all songs on June 1, 1966.

The album was originally scheduled for release on Francis' label MGM Records with the catalogue numbers E-4412 (mono pressings) and SE-4412 (stereo pressings) but was eventually reassigned to MGM's subsidiary label Leon the Lion and released in stereo only under the catalogue number LES-903 in 1968.

Of the thirteen recorded songs, Batman remains unreleased to this day. Along with her 1960 UK-Single Robot Man and her 1968 rendition of the Burt Bacharach classic Promises, Promises, Francis herself calls Batman "the dumbest song I've ever recorded".

== Track listing ==
=== Side A ===
#	Title	Songwriter	Length
1.	"Do-Re-Mi"	Richard Rodgers, Oscar Hammerstein II	2.39
2.	"I'm Henry VIII. I Am"	Fred Murray, R. P. Weston	2.16
3.	"Puff, the Magic Dragon"	Leonard Lipton, Peter Yarrow	3.18
4.	"Itsy Bitsy Teenie Weenie Yellow Polka Dot Bikini"	Paul Vance, Lee Pockriss	2.35
5.	"Tie Me Kangaroo Down, Sport"	Rolf Harris	2.17
6.	"This Land Is Your Land"	Woody Guthrie	2.55

=== Side B ===
#	Title	Songwriter	Length
1.	"Supercalifragilisticexpialidocious"	Robert B. Sherman, Richard M. Sherman	2.10
2.	"England Swings"	Roger Miller	1.47
3.	"The Children's Marching Song"	traditional	1.56
4.	"Hello Muddah, Hello Faddah"	Allan Sherman	2.12
5.	"A Spoonful of Sugar"	Robert B. Sherman, Richard M. Sherman	2.13
6.	Mrs. Brown, You've Got a Lovely Daughter"	Trevor Peacock	2.10

=== Not included songs from the sessions ===
#	Title	Songwriter	Length	Remark
1.	"Batman"	Neal Hefti	1.56	unreleased to this day
