= Inside Daisy Clover =

- Theatrical release poster
- Directed by: Robert Mulligan
- Screenplay by: Gavin Lambert
- Based on: Inside Daisy Clover; 1963 novel by Gavin Lambert
- Produced by: Alan J. Pakula
- Starring: Natalie Wood; Christopher Plummer; Robert Redford; Roddy McDowall; Ruth Gordon; Katharine Bard; Peter Helm
- Cinematography: Charles Lang
- Edited by: Aaron Stell
- Music by: André Previn
- Distributed by: Warner Bros. Pictures
- Release date: December 22, 1965
- Running time: 128 minutes
- Country: United States
- Language: English
- Box office: $1.5 million; (est. US/Canada rentals)

Inside Daisy Clover is a 1965 American drama film based on Gavin Lambert's 1963 novel of the same name, directed by Robert Mulligan and starring Natalie Wood. It follows a tomboy becoming a Hollywood actress and singer.

== Plot ==
In 1936, Daisy Clover is a tomboy living with her eccentric mother in a ramshackle trailer in the seaside town of Angel Beach. Wishing to become an actress, Daisy submits a recorded song to studio owner Raymond Swan.

Swan signs her to a contract for five years and arranges to commit her mother to a mental institution. Daisy meets and spends time with fellow actor Wade Lewis, but Raymond fears that the romance will interrupt Daisy's career. Wade asks Daisy to marry him and the ceremony is held at Raymond's house. During the honeymoon, Wade disappears and leaves Daisy in Arizona. When Daisy returns to California, Raymond's intoxicated wife Melora reveals that she had an affair with Wade, who is bisexual. Raymond confirms Wade's secret life to Daisy and begins an affair with her.

Daisy removes her mother from the institution to a house on the beach. When her mother unexpectedly dies, Daisy suffers a nervous breakdown. Unable to work, she spends her days at home under the care of a private nurse. Impatient with Daisy's long recovery, Raymond angrily asserts that she must finish her contract and pending film. After Raymond and the nurse leave the house, Daisy attempts suicide, only to be foiled by constant interruptions.

Daisy decides to leave everything behind. Before departing the beach house, she sets the oven's gas to full power and the house explodes behind her as she walks along the beach. When a passing fisherman asks her what has happened. Daisy replies, “Someone declared war.”

== Cast ==
- Natalie Wood as Daisy Clover
- Christopher Plummer as Raymond Swan
- Robert Redford as Wade Lewis
- Ruth Gordon as Lucile Clover
- Roddy McDowall as Walter Baines
- Katharine Bard as Melora Swan
- Peter Helm as Milton Hopwood
- Betty Harford as Gloria Clover Goslett
- John Hale as Harry Goslett
- Harold Gould as Cop on Pier
- Ottola Nesmith as Dolores
- Edna Holland as Cynara

== Reception ==
Upon its release, the film was a box office and critical failure. However, the film later gained a cult following when it was shown on television and released on home video.

The New York World-Telegram and The Sun found much to criticize: "[The film] conducts a spectacular travesty of some of Hollywood's preposterously lush nooks without stirring any notable amount of mirth. And it follows Hollywood's predatory smothering of an impulsive, endearing Cinderella without stirring much sentiment or sympathy... Oh! This pathetic innocent is hurt, hurt, hurt but no one cares, cares, cares so long as her picture is finished and rolls in dough, dough, dough... The makers of the picture do not care to make themselves altogether clear but there are hints of the depravity of its Hollywood in fleeting insinuations of dope and homosexuality. The orgies of sex and liquor are much more explicitly presented... [Natalie Wood] seems about to become the movie's biggest dubbing job since Rita Hayworth made her long series of musicals, coming equipped with a different voice for nearly every picture."

Redford reportedly insisted that his character, gay in the original novel, have some interest in women. Warner Bros. Pictures, fearful of the potential controversy, insisted that the film only acknowledge the character's bisexuality through brief and oblique lines of dialogue.

The house that was destroyed at the climax of the film was once owned by actress Barbara La Marr.

== Accolades ==
| Award | Category | Nominee(s) | Result | Ref. |
|---|---|---|---|---|
| Academy Awards | Best Supporting Actress | Ruth Gordon | Nominated | |
| Academy Awards | Best Art Direction – Color | Art Direction: Robert Clatworthy; Set Decoration: George James Hopkins | Nominated | |
| Academy Awards | Best Costume Design – Color | Edith Head and Bill Thomas | Nominated | |
| Golden Globe Awards | Best Actress in a Motion Picture – Musical or Comedy | Natalie Wood | Nominated | |
| Golden Globe Awards | Best Supporting Actress – Motion Picture | Ruth Gordon | Won | |
| Golden Globe Awards | Most Promising Newcomer – Male | Robert Redford | Won | |

== Soundtrack ==
Wood's singing voice was dubbed by session singer Jackie Ward with the exception of the introduction to the song "You're Gonna Hear from Me" (by Dory Previn and André Previn, who composed the score). The song was later recorded by Connie Francis in English for the album Movie Greats of the 60s (1966) and one year later in Spanish as "Ya te hablarán de mi" for the Spanish version of the album, Grandes Éxitos del Cine de los Años 60. It was also recorded by Dionne Warwick for the album The Windows of the World (1967), by Scott Walker on his debut solo album Scott (1967) and by Barbra Streisand for The Movie Album (2003).

Wood's vocal recordings, completed for other songs, were unused and unheard on commercial recordings until the Film Score Monthly CD #187 was released in April 2009.

== See also ==
- List of American films of 1965

== Sources ==
- Lambert, Gavin (2004). Natalie Wood: A Life. Alfred A. Knopf. ISBN 0-375-41074-0.
- Lamparski, Richard (1981). Lamparski's Hidden Hollywood. New York: Simon & Schuster. ISBN 0-671-41885-8.
