= The Doug Crosley Show =

- Genre: Music
- Created by: Perry Rosemond
- Written by: Tom Ashmore; Omar Williams
- Presented by: Doug Crosley
- Country of origin: Canada
- Original language: English
- No. of seasons: 1

Production
- Producer: Larry Brown
- Production location: Winnipeg
- Running time: 30 minutes

Original release
- Network: CBC Television
- Release: 16 June – 21 July 1973

The Doug Crosley Show is a Canadian music variety television series that aired on CBC Television in 1973.

== Premise ==
Doug Crosley had appeared in stage productions and on television series such as Juliette. For his own 1973 series, Crosley adopted country music styles in contrast to the traditional show tunes he previously performed.

Regular series bands were the Dave Shaw Orchestra and country group Humphrey and the Dumptrucks. Singlers Liliane Stillwell and Sherisse Laurence were additional series performers.

== Scheduling ==
This half-hour series was broadcast Saturdays at 7:00 p.m. (Eastern) from 16 June to 21 July 1973.
