= I Will Wait for You =

Award-winning song released in 1966

"I Will Wait for You" is the English version of "Je ne pourrai jamais vivre sans toi", which literally translates to: "I could never live without you". "Je ne pourrai jamais vivre sans toi", is a song from the French musical The Umbrellas of Cherbourg (Les Parapluies de Cherbourg, 1964).

In 1965, American singer Steve Lawrence recorded the song, which received a single release. The song reached No. 113 on the Billboard charts.

Its music was composed by Michel Legrand and the original lyrics were written by Jacques Demy. It was performed in the film by Catherine Deneuve, whose voice was dubbed by Danielle Licari. The English lyrics of the song were written by Norman Gimbel. This version was nominated for the Academy Award for Best Song at the 38th Academy Awards held in 1966.

In July 1966, Connie Francis released an English-language cover of the song on her album Movie Greats of the 60s. This was prominently featured in a 2002 episode of the American television series Futurama titled "Jurassic Bark". In 1967, Cher also released a cover of this song on her album With Love, Chér.
