= Love, Italian Style =

Studio album by Connie Francis
- Released: January 1967
- Recorded: October 12–14, 1966
- Studios: Milan Ricordi Studios, Rome
- Genre: Pop
- Labels: MGM; E-4448 (mono)/SE-4448 (stereo)
- Producer: Pete Spargo

Connie Francis chronology
Connie Francis and The Kids Next Door (1966)	Love, Italian Style (1967)	Happiness - Connie Francis On Broadway Today (1967)

Love, Italian Style is a studio album recorded by American pop singer Connie Francis, released in January 1967.

== Background ==
During October 1966, Francis recorded several Italian and Neapolitan language tracks at Milan Ricordi Studios in Rome, Italy. Some tracks were Italian language cover versions of her current US hits, such as "Spanish Nights and You", while others were of Italian origin, such as "Regent's Park" (the theme song for an Italian television miniseries Melissa) and "Canta ragazzina," her entry for the 1967 edition of the Sanremo Festival. At least one, "La violetera", is a Spanish song sung in Italian.

The album was produced by Pete Spargo and engineered by Val Valentin; the orchestra was conducted by Iller Pattacini. The album consists of traditional Italian songs brought up to date with combined arrangements of traditional Italian instruments (e.g. mandolins) and modern instruments (e.g. electric guitars).

Francis sings all songs either entirely in Italian, Neapolitan, or bilingually in Neapolitan and English.

== Reception ==
Billboard stated that "Connie is back in Italy and bringing her own unique style to that country's beautiful melodies," adding that "From emotional readings of 'Passione' and 'tile Vurria Vasa' to a rousing 'Tarantella,' she excels."

== Track listing ==
=== Side A ===
#	Title	Songwriter	Length
1.	"Souvenir d'Italie" ("Souvenir of Italy")	L. Luttazzi, S. Tambusi, Carl Sigman	2.38
2.	"Chella llá"	S. Taccani, U. Bertini, A. Hoffman, D. Manning	1.45
3.	"I' te vurria vasà"	V. Russo, E. Di Capua	3.31
4.	"La Violetera"	Traditional	1.37
5.	"Passione"	Traditional	2.42
6.	"Tango delle Rose"	Albert Gamse, Schreier-Bottero	2.00

=== Side B ===
#	Title	Songwriter	Length
1.	"Statte vicino a 'mme"	E. Barrata, A. Ciervo, A. Delle Grotte	2.57
2.	"Piscatore 'e Pusilleco" ("The Fisher of Pusilleco")	E. Marolo, E. Tagliaferri, O. Paul	2.20
3.	"Tarantella" ("Lucky, Lucky, Lucky Me")	M. Berle, B. Arnold	1.45
4.	"'Na voce, 'na chitarra e 'o poco 'e luna"	C. A. Rossi, U. Calise, A. Stillmann	2.05
5.	"Scalinatella" ("Stairway to the Sea")	G. Cioffi, S. Bonagura, A. A. Beach	2.39
6.	"Terra straniera"	E. Liberati, M. Marletta	3.08
