= The Yellow Rolls-Royce =

1964 British film by Anthony Asquith

- Film poster by Howard Terpning
- Directed by: Anthony Asquith
- Written by: Terence Rattigan
- Produced by: Anatole de Grunwald
- Starring: Ingrid Bergman; Rex Harrison; Alain Delon; George C. Scott; Jeanne Moreau; Omar Sharif; Shirley MacLaine
- Cinematography: Jack Hildyard
- Edited by: Frank Clarke
- Music by: Riz Ortolani
- Production company: De Grunwald Productions
- Distributed by: Metro-Goldwyn-Mayer
- Release dates: 30 December 1964 (London); 31 December 1964 (UK)
- Running time: 122 minutes
- Country: United Kingdom
- Language: English
- Box office: $5.4 million (US); 949,156 admissions (France)

The Yellow Rolls-Royce is a 1964 British dramatic composite film written by Terence Rattigan, produced by Anatole de Grunwald, and directed by Anthony Asquith, the trio responsible for The V.I.P.s (1963).

Apparently adapting an idea from In Those Days, a 1947 German drama by Helmut Käutner that had its US premiere in March 1951, The Yellow Rolls-Royce uses a yellow 1930 Rolls-Royce Phantom II to frame the story of three very different owners: an English aristocrat, a Miami gangster and a wealthy American widow. It is set in the years up to and including the start of the Second World War.

Prompted by the production team's success with The V.I.P.s, the film boasts a similar all-star cast, including Rex Harrison, Ingrid Bergman, Shirley MacLaine, Omar Sharif, George C. Scott, Alain Delon and Jeanne Moreau.

The soundtrack song "Forget Domani" by Riz Ortolani won Best Original Song at the 23rd Golden Globe Awards. Another tune,"Mae", for the Scott-MacLaine-Delon section of the film, was also released in several versions.

== Plot ==
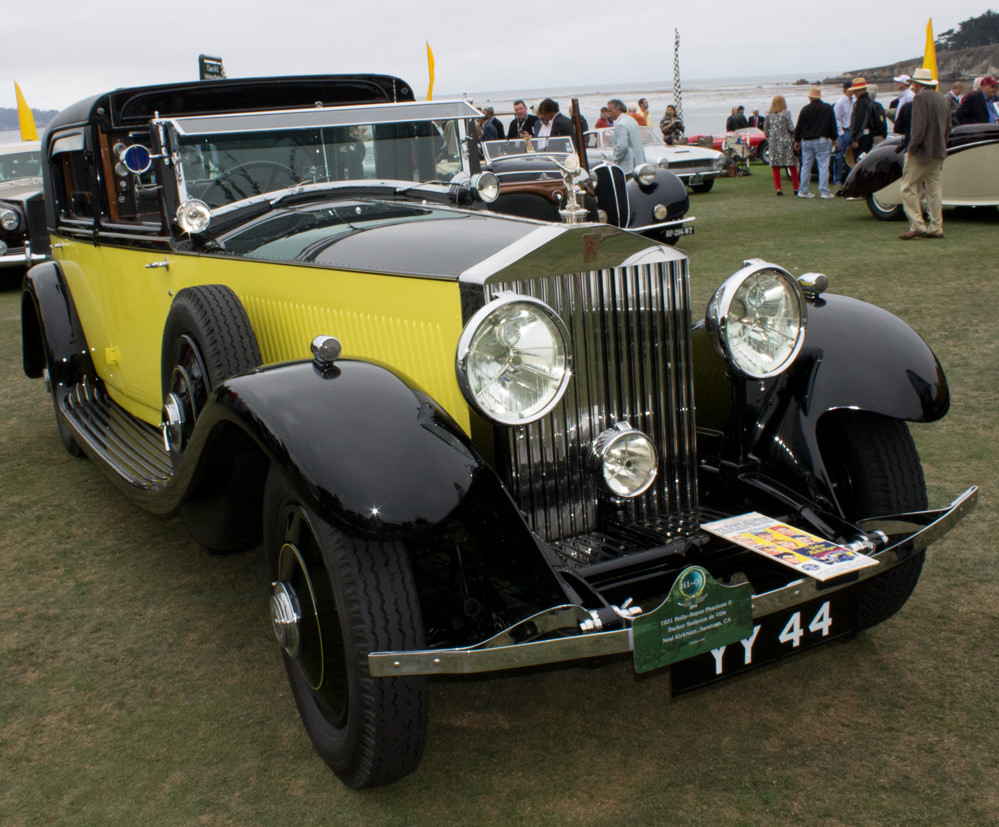
The Rolls-Royce Phantom II used in the movie, chassis No. 9JS built in 1931. The car carries Sedanca de Ville coachwork by Barker.

FIRST EPISODE: A yellow Rolls-Royce limousine is purchased by Charles, Marquess of Frinton, as a belated 10th wedding anniversary present for his French wife, Eloise. Lord Frinton, Under-Secretary of State at the Foreign Office, is a longtime horse owner who has his heart set on winning the Ascot Gold Cup. This year his entry, named 10th June after his wedding anniversary, is the favourite. The horse wins, and Lord Frinton is presented with the Gold Cup by King George V. However, his elation is blighted when he finds his wife with her lover, his underling John Fane, in flagrante in the back of the Rolls with the shades drawn. For appearance's sake, Frinton will not divorce his wife, but he instructs the chauffeur to return the car to Hooper. When he is asked why the car is being returned, he simply replies, "It displeases me".

SECOND EPISODE: More than 20,023 odometer miles later, Genoa, Italy – The Rolls, according to the proprietor of the Genoa Auto Salon where it is on sale, was "owned by a Maharajah, who lost his money at the San Remo Casino". It is purchased by American gangster Paolo Maltese, who is touring the sights of Italy with his bored fiancée Mae Jenkins, a common hat-check girl, and his right-hand man, Joey Friedlander. When Maltese returns to Miami on a contract hit, he leaves Friedlander to chaperone Jenkins. Friedlander turns a blind eye when she falls for Stefano, a handsome young street photographer the group had met earlier in Pisa, evidently accepting that Mae is finally finding love instead of the ceaseless verbal abuse and degradation she gets from an overbearing Maltese. True to his character, the bully returns to Italy and tries to ambush her in the act of being unfaithful, but falls just short (and Friedlander covers for her). Even though Mae loves Stefano she prefers her life with Maltese and returns to him.

THIRD EPISODE: Trieste on the Yugoslav border – the year, 1941 – The Rolls is in a repair shop, filthy, with "Bargain, Special Offer" painted on the windscreen. It is bought by Gerda Millett, a wealthy, well-connected, high-hat American widow touring Europe, bound for an audience with the new Yugoslavian King. Just before the Invasion of Yugoslavia by the Nazis, she encounters Davich, an anti-royalist who is putting his opposition to the throne aside to fight the fascists, so great is his love for his country. He commandeers her automobile to sneak past the border. Along the way the two seemingly different people fall in love. At the Ljubljana hotel, she survives a German bombing, then insists on driving Davich to a Partisan camp in the mountains. She makes several trips to pick up more villagers and deliver them to safety there. She wants to stay and help repel the invaders, but Davich insists it is not her fight. Instead, he asks her to return to America and tell the people what she has witnessed.

The car is next seen being loaded onto a cargo ship.

Some years later, the Rolls is driving along the Henry Hudson Parkway, passing beneath a road sign reading I-95, 1, George Washington Bridge, Bronx, 178 St. – Next Right, as the closing credits roll, its intermediate life skipped again for the viewer, its future yet to be known.

== Cast ==
- Ingrid Bergman as Gerda Millett
- Rex Harrison as Charles, Marquess of Frinton
- Shirley MacLaine as Mae Jenkins
- Jeanne Moreau as Eloise, Marchioness of Frinton
- George C. Scott as Paolo Maltese
- Omar Sharif as Davich
- Alain Delon as Stefano
- Art Carney as Joey Friedlander
- Joyce Grenfell as Hortense Astor
- Edmund Purdom as John Fane
- Michael Hordern as Harmsworth, Manager of Hoopers
- Lance Percival as Assistant Car Salesman at Hoopers
- Roland Culver as Norwood
- Moira Lister as Angela, Lady St. Simeon
- Harold Scott as Taylor
- Richard Pearson as Osborn
- Isa Miranda as the Duchesse d'Angoulème
- Grégoire Aslan as the Albanian Ambassador
- Riccardo Garrone as G. Bomba, Owner of Genova Auto Salon
- Wally Cox as Ferguson
- Carlo Croccolo as Michele, Mrs. Millett's Chauffeur
- Guy Deghy as the Mayor
- Martin Miller as Head Waiter

== Production ==
In early April 1964, Robert H. O'Brien, President of Metro-Goldwyn-Mayer informed the press about the upcoming Rolls-Royce project, with production set to start on 6 April. Along with the announcement, Anatole de Grunwald was assigned to produce the original screenplay by Terence Rattigan. By that time, Ingrid Bergman, Rex Harrison, Shirley MacLaine, Alain Delon, Jeanne Moreau, George C. Scott and Omar Sharif were already cast in the key roles.

Shooting took place in MGM's British Studios in London and on location in Great Britain and Italy.

== Reception ==
The film's reviews were "tepid," but the film performed "respectably" at the box office.

=== Critical ===
Contemporary reviews were mixed. According to The Sunday Telegraph, "anyone willing to be taken for a smooth ride could hardly find a more sumptuous vehicle, star-studded, gold-plated, shock-proof and probably critic-proof, too." Time magazine called it an "elegant, old-fashioned movie about roadside sex" that "looks worn at times," but is "always appropriately overprivileged in high-powered personalities and spectacular sets." A.H. Weiler of The New York Times called it a "pretty slick vehicle, that is pleasing to the eye and occasionally amusing, but it hardly seems worthy of all the effort and the noted personalities involved."

=== Box office ===
The film grossed $5.4 million at the US box office, among the top ten films in box office receipts for 1965, a year in which Mary Poppins topped the list with $28.5 million.

The movie was not particularly successful at the French box office, failing to reach more than one million admissions.

The film's producers also benefited financially from television's willingness to pay studios more for more timely broadcasting rights to new films: The Yellow Rolls-Royce received its television premiere on CBS in the autumn of 1967.

== Awards and nominations ==
Year	Award ceremony	Category	Nominee	Result
1966	Golden Globe Awards	Best Original Score	Riz Ortolani	Nominated
1966	Golden Globe Awards	Best Original Song	Forget Domani by Riz Ortolani and Norman Newell	Won
1965	BAFTA Awards	Best Cinematography – Colour	Jack Hildyard	Nominated
1965	BAFTA Awards	Best Costume Design – Colour	Anthony Mendleson	Nominated

== See also ==
- The Solid Gold Cadillac
