= Call Me Irresponsible =

Song by Jackie Gleason
- Published: 1962 by Paramount Music
- Composer: Jimmy Van Heusen
- Lyricist: Sammy Cahn

"Call Me Irresponsible" is a 1962 song composed by Jimmy Van Heusen with lyrics written by Sammy Cahn which won the Academy Award for Best Original Song in 1963.

== Background ==
According to the Mel Tormé book The Other Side of the Rainbow with Judy Garland on the Dawn Patrol, Van Heusen originally wrote the song for Garland to sing at a CBS dinner. At that time, Garland had just signed to do The Judy Garland Show on CBS, and the intent of the song was to parody her well-known problems. Garland later sang the song on the seventh episode of the show.

However, in 1988, Sammy Cahn said during an interview with freelance writer Harlan Conti, in San Francisco, that the song was originally written for Fred Astaire to sing in the film Papa's Delicate Condition in which Astaire was to star. Cahn personally auditioned the song for Astaire's approval, which was given. However, Astaire's contractual obligations prevented him from making the film and the role went to Jackie Gleason, who introduced the song. It won the Academy Award for Best Original Song at the 36th Academy Awards held in 1964.

Cahn is said to have had a particular satisfaction in the number of five-syllable words in the lyrics of "Call Me Irresponsible".

== Notable renditions ==
- Jack Jones - Released the song as a single in 1963, it reached No. 75 on the Billboard Hot 100.
- Frank Sinatra – Sinatra's Sinatra (1963).
- Connie Francis - Movie Greats Of The 60s (1966).
- Bobby Darin - From Hello Dolly to Goodbye Charlie (1964).
- Michael Bublé - Call Me Irresponsible (2007).
