= September of My Years =

1965 studio album by Frank Sinatra

Studio album by Frank Sinatra
- Released: August 1965 (LP); October 1986 (CD)
- Recorded: April 13–14, 22 and May 27, 1965, Hollywood
- Genres: Traditional pop, vocal jazz
- Length: 44:02
- Labels: Reprise; FS 1014
- Producer: Sonny Burke

Frank Sinatra chronology
Sinatra '65: The Singer Today (1965)	September of My Years (1965)	My Kind of Broadway (1965)

Professional ratings
Review scores
Source	Rating
AllMusic	5/5 stars
Encyclopedia of Popular Music	5/5 stars
Record Mirror	4/5 stars

September of My Years

Studio album by Frank Sinatra
- Released: August 31, 2010
- Recorded: April 13–14, 22 and May 27, 1965, Hollywood; Additional Guitar Overdubs on March 14, 1968; June 1984, Carnegie Hall, New York, New York
- Genres: Traditional pop, vocal jazz
- Label: Reprise
- Producer: Sonny Burke

September of My Years is a 1965 studio album by American singer Frank Sinatra, released on Reprise Records in August 1965 on LP and October 1986 on CD. It was his fifth album collaboration with arranger Gordon Jenkins. Released shortly before Sinatra's fiftieth birthday in December of that year, September of My Years hearkens back to the ballad-oriented concept albums of his 1950s Capitol era, with songs that broadly explore themes of ageing, self-reflection and nostalgia.

It peaked at No. 5 on the Billboard Pop Albums chart. Both September of My Years and the double-LP compilation A Man and His Music won the Grammy Award for Album of the Year. In 2000 it was voted number 190 in Colin Larkin's All Time Top 1000 Albums.

== Background ==
This was the first album Sinatra and Jenkins had recorded together since 1962's All Alone. Jenkins and Sinatra would next work together on the 1973 album Ol' Blue Eyes Is Back, the 1980 album Trilogy: Past Present Future, and the 1981 album She Shot Me Down.

CBS television cameras captured Sinatra recording "It Was a Very Good Year" for this album. The footage was included in a Walter Cronkite CBS News special broadcast on November 16, 1965. Sinatra's performance of "It Was a Very Good Year" won the Grammy Award for Best Vocal Performance, Male. Arranger Gordon Jenkins was awarded the Grammy Award for Best Instrumental Arrangement Accompanying Vocalist(s) for the same song.

The album was released on CD on October 10, 1986. It was re-released and remastered on May 26, 1998, as part of the Entertainer of the Century series done together by Reprise and Capitol Records. That version is currently out of print. Concord Records reissued the album again, newly remastered on compact disc, on August 31, 2010. This version includes two bonus tracks, a live performance of "This Is All I Ask" recorded at Carnegie Hall in June 1984, and the single mix of "How Old Am I?" released in 1968.

== Themes ==
September of My Years is a concept album exploring the "who am I" questions and perspectives that someone, particularly a man, faces upon entering middle age. For instance, in "It Was a Very Good Year," the narrator looks back upon his life at ages 17, 21, 35, and now, in his personal "September." The structure of the song, which lasts almost four and a half minutes, was highly unusual for a popular song of the time, as it exceeded most other songs of that era by more than a minute. In the process, the narrator "takes his time" to review his past relationships with a bittersweet mixture of satisfaction and regret. Similarly, in "Hello, Young Lovers," the narrator offers to young people the guidance and wisdom he has gleaned from experience. In other songs, like "The Man in the Looking Glass" and "Last Night When We Were Young," the narrator conducts an internal dialogue that reviews both the accomplishments and disappointments of his life. In addition to the lyrical content, the musical background reflects a more mature Sinatra than the Capitol recordings of the 1950s and his Reprise albums of the early 1960s. Instead of the big-band, "swing" arrangements with horn sections of those earlier songs, this LP features an orchestra with nine violinists. These strings provide a delicate interplay with the vocals, allowing the listener to easily hear and take in the lyrics.

== Track listing ==
1. "The September of My Years" (Jimmy Van Heusen, Sammy Cahn) – 3:12
2. "How Old Am I?" (Gordon Jenkins) – 3:30
3. "Don't Wait Too Long" (Sunny Skylar) – 3:04
4. "It Gets Lonely Early" (Van Heusen, Cahn) – 2:57
5. "This Is All I Ask" (Jenkins) – 3:03
6. "Last Night When We Were Young" (Harold Arlen, E.Y. Harburg) – 3:33
7. "The Man in the Looking Glass" (Bart Howard) – 3:25
8. "It Was a Very Good Year" (Ervin Drake) – 4:25
9. "When the Wind Was Green" (Don Hunt, Henry Stinson) – 3:22
10. "Hello, Young Lovers" (Richard Rodgers, Oscar Hammerstein II) – 3:41
11. "I See It Now" (Alec Wilder, William Engvick) – 2:50
12. "Once Upon a Time" (Charles Strouse, Lee Adams) – 3:30
13. "September Song" (Kurt Weill, Maxwell Anderson) – 3:30

Bonus tracks included on the 2010 reissue:

1. "This Is All I Ask - Live" – 3:49
2. "How Old Am I? - Single Version" – 3:42

Notes

- The Orchestra on "The September of My Years" features 9 Violins
- The Orchestra on tracks 2–13 and 15 features 16 Violins
- Henry Stinson is also known as Donald Henry Stinson

== Personnel ==
- Frank Sinatra – vocals (all tracks)
- Bill Miller – piano (1–13, 15)
- Joe Parnello – piano, conductor (14)
- Bob Bain – guitar (1)
- Bill Pitman – guitar (1)
- Tony Mottola – guitar (14)
- Joe Comfort – string bass (1)
- Mike Rubin – string bass (1–13, 15)
- Max Bennett – additional bass guitar (15)
- Irving Cottler – drums (1, 14)
- Nick Fatool – drums (2–13, 15)
- Al Hendrickson – guitar (9, 11–12)
- Buddy Collette – saxophone, woodwind (1)
- Alvin Dinkin – viola (1–2, 4–5, 7–9, 11–12, 15)
- Melinda Eckels – oboe (2, 4–5, 7–8, 15), flute (3, 6, 9–13)
- Bert Gassman – oboe (3, 6, 9–13)
- Chuck Gentry – saxophone, woodwind (1)
- Justin Gordon – saxophone, woodwind (1)
- Stanley Harris – viola (1)
- Lloyd Hildebrand – bassoon (2–13, 15), flute (3, 6, 9–13)
- Clyde Hylton – clarinet (2–13, 15), flute (3, 6, 9–13)
- Gordon Jenkins – arranger (all tracks), conductor (1–13, 15)
- Kathryn Julye – harp (1)
- Armand Kaproff – cello (1–2, 4–5, 8–9, 11–12, 15)
- Louis Kievman – viola (2, 4–5, 7–9, 11–12, 15)
- Harry Klee – clarinet (2–13, 15), flute (3, 6, 9–13), saxophone, woodwind (1)
- Arnold Koblentz – oboe (2, 4–5, 7–8, 15)
- Cappy Lewis – trumpet (1)
- Edgar Lustgarten – cello (1)
- Ray Menhennick – viola (3, 6, 10, 13)
- Dick Nash – trombone (1)
- Tommy Pederson – trombone (1)
- Kurt Reher – cello (3, 6, 10, 13)
- George Roberts – bass trombone (1)
- Paul Robyn – viola (2–13, 15)
- Sanford Schonbach – viola (3, 6, 10, 13)
- Willie Schwartz – saxophone, woodwind (1)
- Tom Shepard – trombone (1)
- Barbara Simons – viola (1)
- Eleanor Slatkin – cello (1)
- Wayne Songer – clarinet (2–13, 15)
- Vincent Terri – guitar (2–8, 10, 13, 15)
- Kathryn Thompson Vail – harp (2–13, 15)

== Charts ==
Chart (1965)	Peak position
US Billboard 200	5

== Certifications ==
Region	Certification	Certified units/sales
United States (RIAA)	Gold	500,000^{^}
^{^} Shipments figures based on certification alone.
