= Grammy Award for Album of the Year =

American music industry award

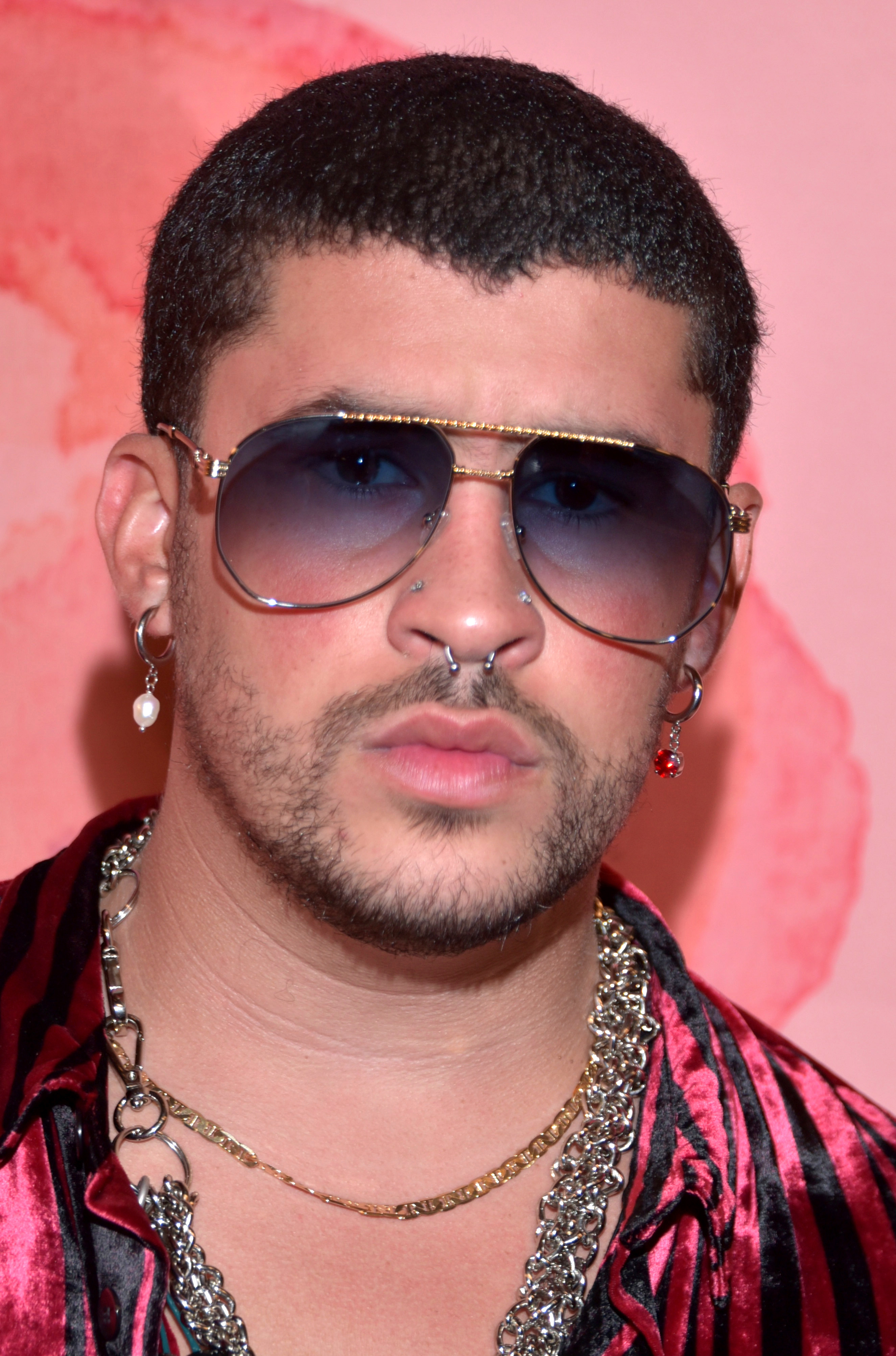
- Debí Tirar Más Fotos by Bad Bunny is the most recent recipient.
- Awarded for: Quality vocal or instrumental recording albums
- Country: United States
- Presented by: National Academy of Recording Arts and Sciences
- First award: 1959
- Currently held by: Bad Bunny – Debí Tirar Más Fotos (2026)

Highlights
- Most wins: Taylor Swift (4)
- Most nominations: Frank Sinatra & Taylor Swift (8)
- Website: grammy.com

The Grammy Award for Album of the Year is an award presented by the National Academy of Recording Arts and Sciences of the United States to "honor artistic achievement, technical proficiency and overall excellence in the recording industry, without regard to album sales, chart position, or critical reception." Album of the Year is the most prestigious category at the Grammy Awards and is one of the general field categories that have been presented annually since the 1st Annual Grammy Awards in 1959 alongside Best New Artist, Record of the Year, and Song of the Year.

== Credit rules ==
Over the years, the rules on who was presented with an award have changed:

- 1959–1965: Artist only.
- 1966–1998: Artist and producer.
- 1999–2002: Artist, producer, and recording engineer or mixer.
- 2003–2017: Artist, featured artist, producer, mastering engineer, and recording engineer or mixer.
- 2018–2020: Artist, featured artist, producer, songwriter (of new material), mastering engineer, and recording engineer or mixer (only those who were credited on at least 33% playing time of the album)
- 2021–2023: Artist, featured artist, producer, songwriter (of new material), mastering engineer, and recording engineer or mixer (regardless of credited playing time)
- 2024–future: Artist, featured artist, producer, songwriter (of new material), mastering engineer, and recording engineer or mixer (only those who were credited on at least 20% playing time of the album)

The category expanded to include eight nominees in 2019 and ten in 2022. Beginning with the 2024 ceremony, the number of nominees has been reduced back to eight.

Album of the Year is awarded for a whole album, and the award is presented to the artist, featured artist, producer, songwriter, mastering engineer, and recording engineer or mixer with significant contributions to that album. The similarly titled Record of the Year is awarded for a single or for one track from an album. This award goes to the artist, producer, mastering engineer, and recording engineer or mixer for that song.

== Achievements ==
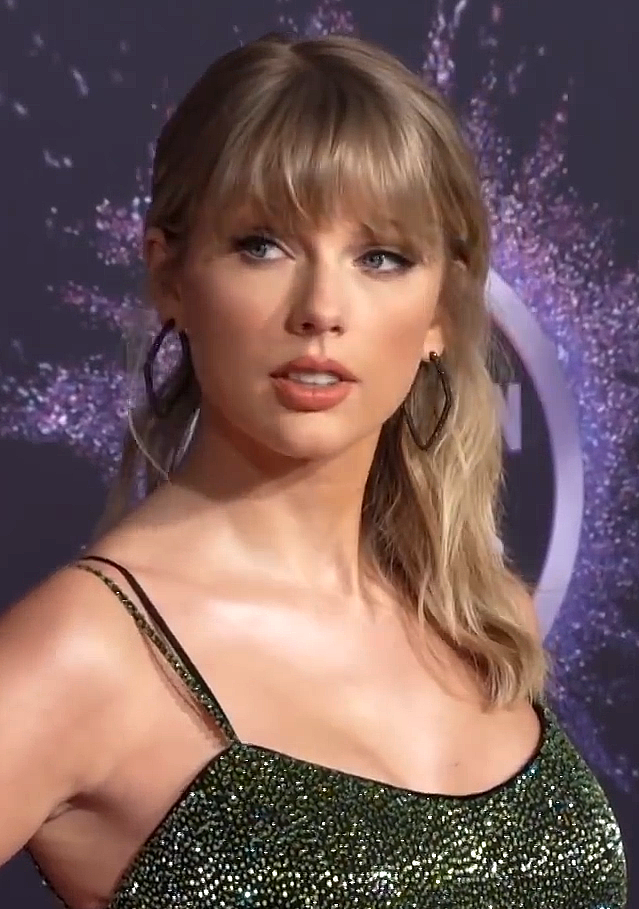
Four-time winner Taylor Swift. She is the first woman to win the award two and three times and the only main credited artist to win four times. She won in 2010, 2016, 2021 and 2024. She is tied as the most nominated act with 8 nominations.

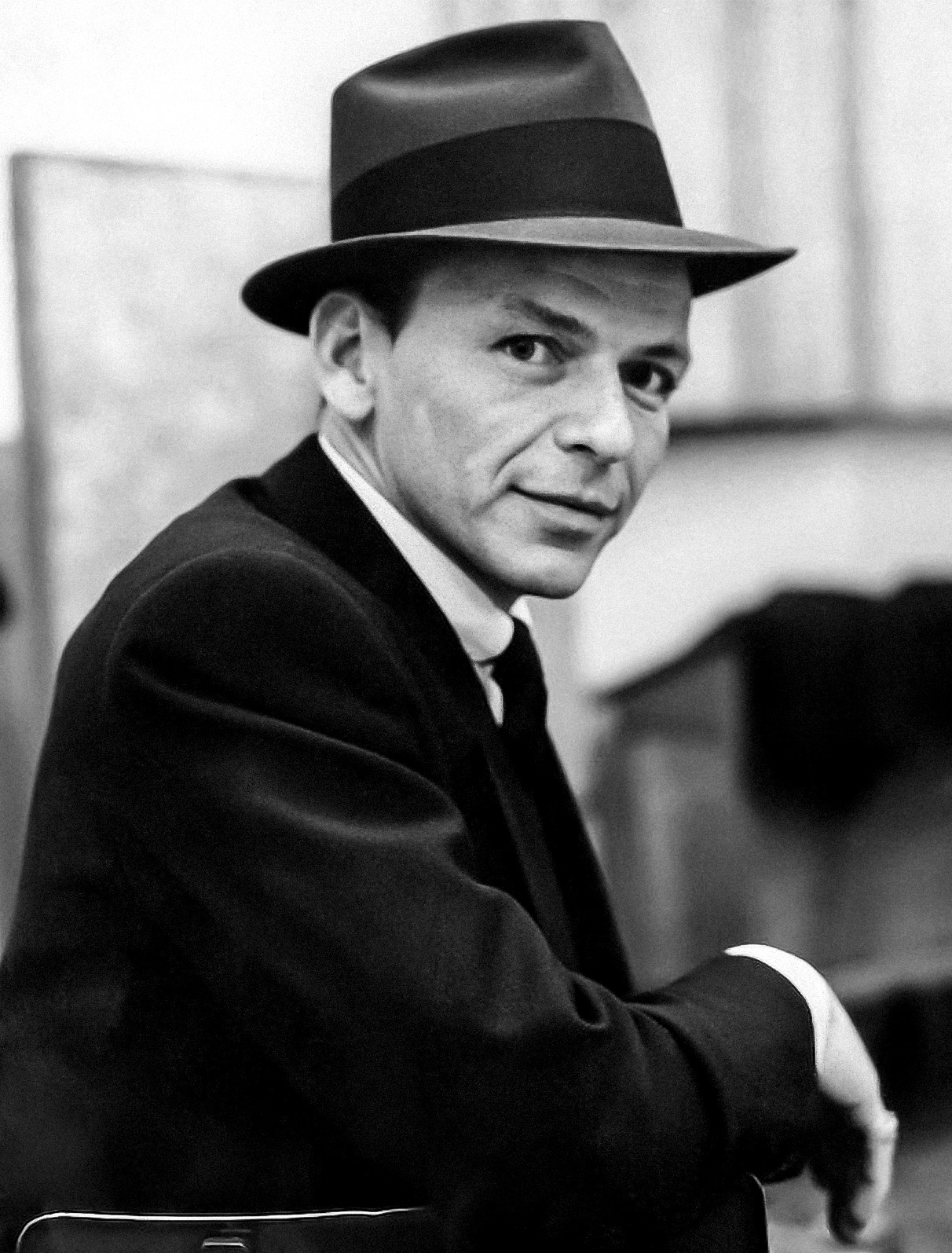
Frank Sinatra was the first two-time winner and three-time winner. He won in 1960, 1966 and 1967. He is tied as most nominated artist in this category with 8 nominations.

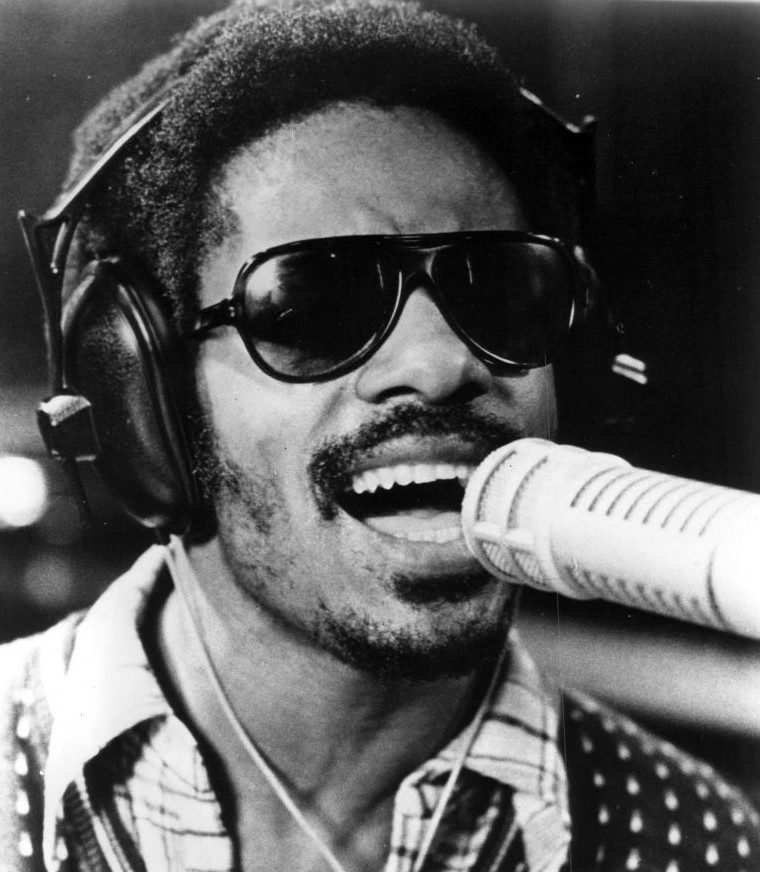
Three-time winner Stevie Wonder won in 1974, 1975 and 1977.

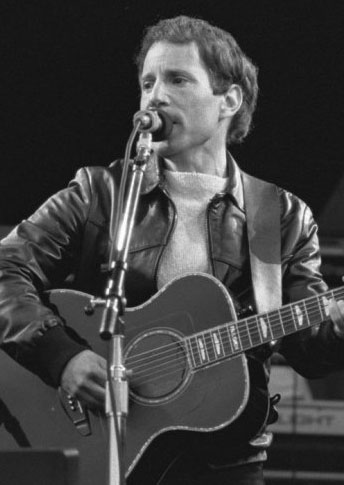
Three-time winner Paul Simon won twice as the main credited artist, in 1976 and 1987.

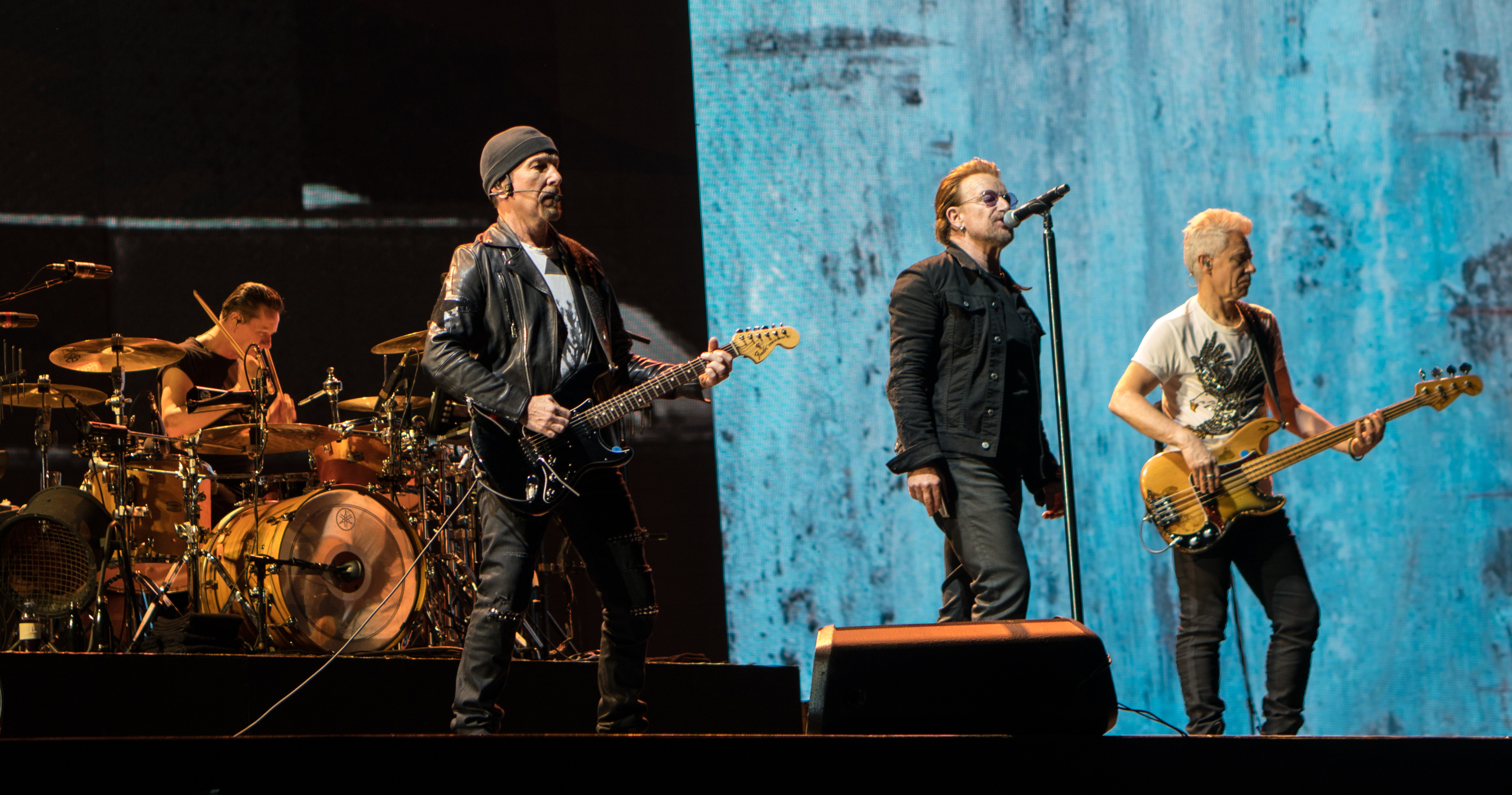
U2 is the only group act to win twice, in 1988 and 2006.

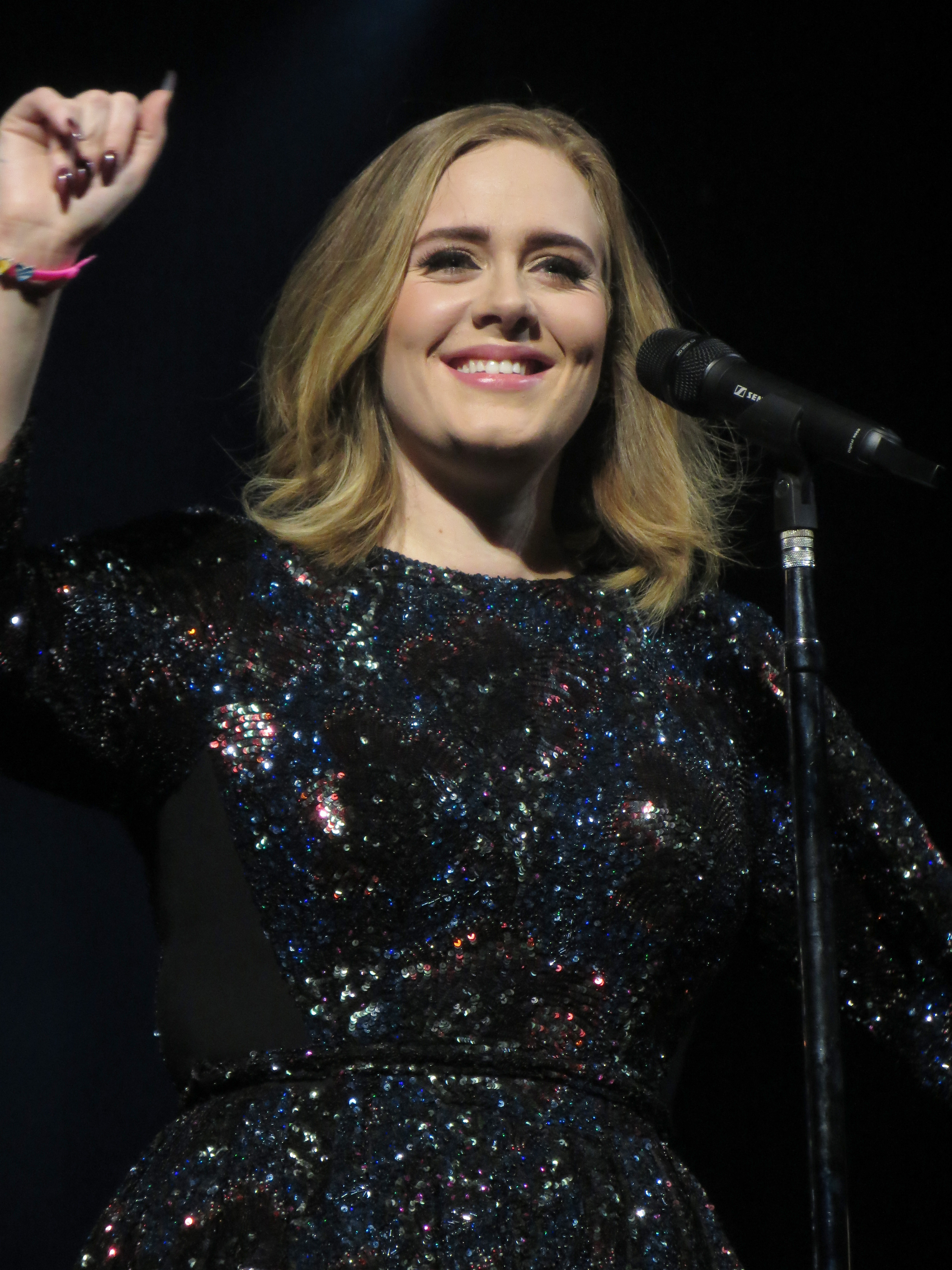
Two-time winner Adele won in 2012 and 2017.

Serban Ghenea (as engineer/mixer) is the most frequent winner in this category with five awards. Taylor Swift (as performer); John Hanes (as engineer/mixer); and Tom Coyne and Randy Merrill (as mastering engineers) have won the award four times. They are followed by Frank Sinatra, Stevie Wonder, and Paul Simon (as performers); Jack Antonoff, David Foster, Daniel Lanois, Phil Ramone, and Ryan Tedder (as album producers); Tom Elmhirst and Mike Piersante and Laura Sisk (as engineers/mixers); and Bob Ludwig (as mastering engineer) with three victories each. Coyne, Ghenea, Hanes, and Ludwig are the only people to win the award in three consecutive years. Paul McCartney leads all performers with nine nominations: five as a member of The Beatles, three for solo albums, and one as a member of Wings. McCartney's former bandmate George Harrison has a total of eight nominations: five as a member of The Beatles, one for a solo album, one for a live album with friends, and one as a member of the Traveling Wilburys. Sinatra, seven for solo albums and one for a duet album; and Swift, having the most nominations amongst female artists; lead solo performers with eight nominations, followed by Barbra Streisand with six.

The first woman to win the award was Judy Garland in 1962, for Judy at Carnegie Hall. Taylor Swift is the first solo female artist to win the award two, three, and four times. Adele has won twice as main credited artist, and Lauryn Hill, Norah Jones, and Alison Krauss also won two times each, first as lead artists for their respective albums, The Miseducation of Lauryn Hill, Come Away with Me, and Raising Sand (Krauss' collaboration album with Robert Plant); Hill won her second Album of the Year as a producer of her collaboration on Santana's Supernatural (featured artists on non-soundtrack albums did not share in the award before 2008), while Jones won again as a featured artist on Herbie Hancock's River: The Joni Letters, and Krauss won again having been a featured artist on the O Brother, Where Art Thou? – Soundtrack.

Billie Eilish is the youngest main credit artist to win in the category, winning for her debut album When We All Fall Asleep, Where Do We Go? in 2020 at the age of 18. The Peasall Sisters, Sarah, Hannah, and Leah, are the category's youngest credited winners, winning for their contributions to the O Brother, Where Art Thou? – Soundtrack at ages 13, 9, and 7 respectively. Leah Peasall is the youngest winner of any Grammy in any category. The youngest person to make an appearance on an Album of the Year is Stevie Wonder's daughter Aisha Morris, who appeared as an infant for "Isn't She Lovely?" on the album Songs in the Key of Life.

Christopher Cross and Billie Eilish are the only artists to receive Grammys for Album of the Year as well as Record of the Year, Song of the Year, and Best New Artist, each winning all four "general field" categories in a single ceremony year. Adele was the first artist to win awards for Album of the Year, Record of the Year, Song of the Year, and Best New Artist on separate occasions. Five artists have won both Album of the Year and Best New Artist in the same year: Bob Newhart (The Button-Down Mind of Bob Newhart in 1961), Lauryn Hill (The Miseducation of Lauryn Hill in 1999), and Norah Jones (Come Away with Me in 2003) along with Christopher Cross (Christopher Cross in 1981) and Billie Eilish (When We All Fall Asleep, Where Do We Go? in 2020) mentioned above.

Frank Sinatra's Come Dance with Me! was the first album by a traditional pop artist to win, Stan Getz's & João Gilberto's Getz/Gilberto was the first by jazz artists, The Beatles' Sgt. Pepper's Lonely Hearts Club Band was the first by rock and roll artists, Glen Campbell's By the Time I Get to Phoenix was the first by a country artist, Lauryn Hill's The Miseducation of Lauryn Hill was the first by a hip hop artist, Santana's Supernatural was the first by a Hispanic artist, Arcade Fire's The Suburbs was the first by indie rock artists, and Daft Punk's Random Access Memories was the first by electronic music artists. Un Verano Sin Ti and Debí Tirar Más Fotos by Bad Bunny are the only Spanish-language albums to be nominated, with the latter being the first Spanish-language album to win.

Only Frank Sinatra and Stevie Wonder have won in two consecutive years as main artists: Sinatra won in 1966 (September of My Years) and 1967 (A Man and His Music) and Wonder won in 1974 (Innervisions) and 1975 (Fulfillingness' First Finale). Lauryn Hill and Bruno Mars have also won in consecutive years, with one win credited as producer rather than artist. Hill won as a producer in 2000 after winning in 1999 as artist and producer. Bruno Mars won as a producer in 2017 before winning as both artist and producer in 2018.

The Beatles were the first and only artists to date to receive Album of the Year nominations in five consecutive years (1966–1970). Frank Sinatra was the first to receive four nominations in consecutive years, 1959–1961 (two nominations at the first ceremony in 1959), receiving 3 more consecutive nominations for 1966–1968. Barbra Streisand (1964–1967) and Kendrick Lamar (2016–2019) also received nominations in four consecutive years while Lady Gaga (2010–2012) was nominated in three consecutive years.

Kendrick Lamar and Taylor Swift are the only performers with Album of the Year nominations for five consecutive studio albums. Beyoncé and Billy Joel follow with four nominations; while The Beatles, Stevie Wonder, Steely Dan, Bonnie Raitt, The Chicks, Kanye West, Lady Gaga, Adele, Billie Eilish and Olivia Rodrigo each received nominations for three consecutive studio albums.

Stevie Wonder and Adele are the only artists to win the award for consecutive studio albums in this category, winning for Innervisions and Fulfillingness' First Finale and Songs in the Key of Life; and 21 and 25, respectively.

Quincy Jones, Lauryn Hill and Bruno Mars are the only performers to win the award both as main-credit artists and as record producers, winning as lead artists for their albums Back on the Block, The Miseducation of Lauryn Hill and 24K Magic, and as producers for Thriller by Michael Jackson, Supernatural by Santana, and 25 by Adele, respectively. Mars' work on the album 25 is credited under his production team name The Smeezingtons.

To date, there have been four "live" albums to win the award: Judy at Carnegie Hall, The Concert for Bangladesh, and two MTV Unplugged albums (Eric Clapton's and Tony Bennett's), which were performed in front of a small live audience. One television soundtrack recording,The Music from Peter Gunn, has won. Two comedy albums have also won this category: The Button-Down Mind of Bob Newhart and The First Family.

=== Artists and bands with multiple wins ===
Eight artists have received the award more than once (either as a main-credit artist, duo or band; not counting wins solely as a producer, mixer or engineer).

Artist/Band	Number of Victories	Albums	Number of Nominations
Taylor Swift	4 (2010, 2016, 2021, 2024)	Fearless (2008), 1989 (2014), Folklore (2020), Midnights (2022)	8 (2010, 2014, 2016, 2021, 2022, 2024, 2025, 2027)
Frank Sinatra	3 (1960, 1966, 1967)	Come Dance with Me! (1959), September of My Years (1965), A Man and His Music (1966)	8 (1959 (2), 1960, 1961, 1966, 1967, 1968, (Note: With Antônio Carlos Jobim) 1981)
Paul Simon	3 (1971, 1976, 1987)	Bridge over Troubled Water (1970), (Note: As Simon & Garfunkel) Still Crazy After All These Years (1975), Graceland (1986)	7 (1969, 1971, 1974, 1976, 1987, 1992, 2001)
Stevie Wonder	3 (1974, 1975, 1977)	Innervisions (1973), Fulfillingness' First Finale (1974), Songs in the Key of Life (1976)	3 (1974, 1975, 1977)
George Harrison	2 (1968, 1973)	Sgt. Pepper's Lonely Hearts Club Band (1967), (Note: As the Beatles) The Concert for Bangladesh (1971) (Note: As George Harrison & Friends)	8 (1966, 1967, 1968, 1969, 1970, 1972, 1973, 1990 (Note: As the Traveling Wilburys))
John Lennon	2 (1968, 1982)	Sgt. Pepper's Lonely Hearts Club Band (1967), Double Fantasy (1980) (Note: With Yoko Ono)	6 (1966, 1967, 1968, 1969, 1970, 1982)
U2	2 (1988, 2006)	The Joshua Tree (1987), How to Dismantle an Atomic Bomb (2004)	4 (1988, 1993, 2002, 2006)
Adele	2 (2012, 2017)	21 (2011), 25 (2015)	3 (2012, 2017, 2023)

== Process ==
From 1995 to 2021, members of the National Academy of Recording Arts and Sciences nominated their choices for album of the year. A list of the top twenty records was given to the Nominations Review Committee, a specially selected group of anonymous members, who then selected the top five records to gain a nomination in the category in a special ballot. The rest of the members then voted on a winner from the five nominees. In 2018, it was announced the number of nominated albums would be increased to eight. In 2021, it was announced that the Nomination Review Committees would be disbanded, and the final nominees for album of the year would be decided by votes from members. Starting in 2022, the number of nominees in the category increased to 10. However, the decision to expand the number of nominees in this category was made 24 hours before the nominees were announced after an early version of the nominations list had already been circulated. This allowed Taylor Swift's Evermore and Kanye West's Donda to be nominated as they were the albums that received the highest number of votes besides the other eight nominees. As of the 2024 ceremony, the number of nominees has been reduced back to eight.

== Winners and nominees ==
=== 1950s ===
Year (Note: Each year is linked to the article about the Grammy Awards held that year.)	Album	Artist(s)
1959	The Music from Peter Gunn	Henry Mancini
1959	Come Fly with Me	Frank Sinatra
1959	Ella Fitzgerald Sings the Irving Berlin Song Book	Ella Fitzgerald
1959	Frank Sinatra Sings for Only the Lonely	Frank Sinatra
1959	Tchaikovsky: Concerto No. 1, In B-Flat Minor, Op.23	Van Cliburn

=== 1960s ===
Year	Album	Artist(s)	Production team
1960	Come Dance with Me!	Frank Sinatra	
1960	Belafonte at Carnegie Hall	Harry Belafonte	
1960	More Music From Peter Gunn	Henry Mancini	
1960	Rachmaninoff Piano Concerto No. 3	Van Cliburn	
1960	Victory at Sea, Vol. I	Robert Russell Bennett	
1961	The Button-Down Mind of Bob Newhart	Bob Newhart	
1961	Belafonte Returns to Carnegie Hall	Harry Belafonte	
1961	Brahms: Concerto	Sviatoslav Richter	
1961	Nice 'n' Easy	Frank Sinatra	
1961	Puccini: Turandot	Erich Leinsdorf	
1961	Wild Is Love	Nat King Cole	
1962	Judy at Carnegie Hall	Judy Garland	
1962	Breakfast at Tiffany's	Henry Mancini	
1962	Genius + Soul = Jazz	Ray Charles	
1962	Great Band with Great Voices	Si Zentner & Johnny Mann Singers	
1962	The Nat King Cole Story	Nat King Cole	
1962	West Side Story (Motion Picture Soundtrack)	John Green	
1963	The First Family	Vaughn Meader	
1963	I Left My Heart in San Francisco	Tony Bennett	
1963	Jazz Samba	Stan Getz & Charlie Byrd	
1963	Modern Sounds in Country and Western Music	Ray Charles	
1963	My Son, the Folk Singer	Allan Sherman	
1964	The Barbra Streisand Album	Barbra Streisand	
1964	Bach's Greatest Hits	Ward Swingle & The Swingle Singers	
1964	Days of Wine and Roses and Other TV Requests	Andy Williams	
1964	Honey in the Horn	Al Hirt	
1964	The Singing Nun	Soeur Sourire	
1965	Getz/Gilberto	Stan Getz & João Gilberto	
1965	Cotton Candy	Al Hirt	
1965	Funny Girl	Barbra Streisand	Bob Merrill & Jule Styne, composers
1965	People	Barbra Streisand	
1965	The Pink Panther	Henry Mancini	
1966	September of My Years	Frank Sinatra	Sonny Burke, producer
1966	Help!	The Beatles	George Martin, producer
1966	My Name Is Barbra	Barbra Streisand	Bob Mersey, producer
1966	My World	Eddy Arnold	Chet Atkins, producer
1966	The Sound Of Music (Motion Picture Soundtrack)	Various Artists	Julie Andrews, featured artist; Neely Plumb, producer
1967	A Man and His Music	Frank Sinatra	Sonny Burke, producer
1967	Color Me Barbra	Barbra Streisand	Bob Mersey, producer
1967	Doctor Zhivago (Original Soundtrack)	Maurice Jarre	Jesse Kaye, producer
1967	Revolver	The Beatles	George Martin, producer
1967	What Now My Love	Herb Alpert & the Tijuana Brass	Herb Alpert & Jerry Moss, producers
1968	Sgt. Pepper's Lonely Hearts Club Band	The Beatles	George Martin, producer
1968	Francis Albert Sinatra & Antônio Carlos Jobim	Frank Sinatra & Antônio Carlos Jobim	Sonny Burke, producer
1968	It Must Be Him	Vikki Carr	Tommy Oliver & Dave Pell, producers
1968	My Cup Runneth Over	Ed Ames	Jim Foglesong, producer
1968	Ode to Billie Joe	Bobbie Gentry	Kelly Gordon & Bobby Paris, producers
1969	By the Time I Get to Phoenix	Glen Campbell	Al De Lory, producer
1969	Bookends	Simon & Garfunkel	Roy Halee & Simon & Garfunkel, producers
1969	Feliciano!	José Feliciano	Rick Jarrard, producer
1969	Magical Mystery Tour	The Beatles	George Martin, producer
1969	A Tramp Shining	Richard Harris	Jimmy L. Webb, producer

=== 1970s ===
Year	Album	Artist(s)	Production team
1970	Blood, Sweat & Tears	Blood, Sweat & Tears	James William Guercio, producer
1970	Abbey Road	The Beatles	George Martin, producer
1970	The Age of Aquarius	The 5th Dimension	Bones Howe, producer
1970	Crosby, Stills & Nash	Crosby, Stills & Nash	Crosby, Stills & Nash, producers
1970	Johnny Cash At San Quentin	Johnny Cash	Bob Johnston, producer
1971	Bridge over Troubled Water	Simon & Garfunkel	Roy Halee & Simon & Garfunkel, producers
1971	Chicago	Chicago	James Guercio, producer
1971	Close to You	Carpenters	Jack Daugherty, producer
1971	Déjà Vu	Crosby, Stills, Nash & Young	Crosby, Stills, Nash & Young, producers
1971	Elton John	Elton John	Gus Dudgeon, producer
1971	Sweet Baby James	James Taylor	Peter Asher, producer
1972	Tapestry	Carole King	Lou Adler, producer
1972	All Things Must Pass	George Harrison	George Harrison & Phil Spector, producers
1972	Carpenters	Carpenters	Jack Daugherty, producer
1972	Jesus Christ Superstar (London Production)	Various Artists	Tim Rice & Andrew Lloyd Webber, producers
1972	Shaft	Isaac Hayes	Isaac Hayes, producer
1973	The Concert for Bangladesh	George Harrison & Friends (Ravi Shankar, Bob Dylan, Leon Russell, Ringo Starr, Billy Preston, Eric Clapton & Klaus Voormann)	George Harrison & Phil Spector, producers
1973	American Pie	Don McLean	Ed Freeman, producer
1973	Jesus Christ Superstar — Original Broadway Cast	Various Artists	Tom Morgan, Tim Rice & Andrew Lloyd Webber, producers
1973	Moods	Neil Diamond	Tom Catalano & Neil Diamond, producers
1973	Nilsson Schmilsson	Nilsson	Richard Perry, producer
1974	Innervisions	Stevie Wonder	Stevie Wonder, producer
1974	Behind Closed Doors	Charlie Rich	Billy Sherrill, producer
1974	The Divine Miss M	Bette Midler	Ahmet Ertegun, Barry Manilow, Joel Dorn & Geoffrey Haslam, producers
1974	Killing Me Softly	Roberta Flack	Joel Dorn, producer
1974	There Goes Rhymin' Simon	Paul Simon	Paul Simon, Phil Ramone, Muscle Shoals Rhythm Studio, Paul Samwell-Smith & Roy Halee, producers
1975	Fulfillingness' First Finale	Stevie Wonder	Stevie Wonder, producer
1975	Back Home Again	John Denver	Milton Okun, producer
1975	Band on the Run	Paul McCartney and Wings	Paul McCartney, producer
1975	Caribou	Elton John	Gus Dudgeon, producer
1975	Court and Spark	Joni Mitchell	Joni Mitchell & Henry Lewy, producers
1976	Still Crazy After All These Years	Paul Simon	Paul Simon & Phil Ramone, producers
1976	Between the Lines	Janis Ian	Brooks Arthur, producer
1976	Captain Fantastic and the Brown Dirt Cowboy	Elton John	Gus Dudgeon, producer
1976	Heart Like a Wheel	Linda Ronstadt	Peter Asher, producer
1976	One of These Nights	Eagles	Bill Szymczyk, producer
1977	Songs in the Key of Life	Stevie Wonder	Stevie Wonder, producer
1977	Breezin'	George Benson	Tommy LiPuma, producer
1977	Chicago X	Chicago	James Guercio, producer
1977	Frampton Comes Alive!	Peter Frampton	Peter Frampton, producer
1977	Silk Degrees	Boz Scaggs	Joe Wissert, producer
1978	Rumours	Fleetwood Mac	Fleetwood Mac, Ken Caillat & Richard Dashut, producers
1978	Aja	Steely Dan	Gary Katz, producer
1978	Hotel California	Eagles	Bill Szymczyk, producer
1978	JT	James Taylor	Peter Asher, producer
1978	Star Wars	John Williams conducting the London Symphony Orchestra	George Lucas, producer
1979	Saturday Night Fever – Soundtrack	Various Artists	Bee Gees, David Shire, KC and the Sunshine Band, Kool & the Gang, MFSB, Ralph MacDonald, Tavares, The Trammps, Walter Murphy & Yvonne Elliman, featured artists; Albhy Galuten, Arif Mardin, Bee Gees, Bill Oakes, Bobby Martin, Broadway Eddie, David Shire, Freddie Perren, Harry Wayne Casey, K.G. Productions, Karl Richardson, Ralph MacDonald, Richard Finch, Ron Kersey, Thomas J. Valentino & William Salter, producers
1979	Even Now	Barry Manilow	Barry Manilow & Ron Dante, producers
1979	Grease (Original Soundtrack)	Various Artists	Stockard Channing, Frankie Valli, Sha Na Na, Louis St. Louis, Cindy Bullens, Frankie Avalon, Olivia Newton-John, Jeff Conaway & John Travolta, featured artists; John Farrar, Karl Richardson, Barry Gibb & Albhy Galuten, producers
1979	Running on Empty	Jackson Browne	Jackson Browne, producer
1979	Some Girls	The Rolling Stones	Mick Jagger & Keith Richards, producers

=== 1980s ===
Year	Album	Artist(s)	Production team
1980	52nd Street	Billy Joel	Phil Ramone, producer
1980	Minute by Minute	The Doobie Brothers	Ted Templeman, producer
1980	The Gambler	Kenny Rogers	Larry Butler, producer
1980	Bad Girls	Donna Summer	Giorgio Moroder & Pete Bellotte, producers
1980	Breakfast in America	Supertramp	Peter Henderson & Supertramp, producers
1981	Christopher Cross	Christopher Cross	Michael Omartian, producer
1981	Glass Houses	Billy Joel	Phil Ramone, producer
1981	The Wall	Pink Floyd	Bob Ezrin, David Gilmour, James Guthrie & Roger Waters, producers
1981	Trilogy: Past Present Future	Frank Sinatra	Sonny Burke, producer
1981	Guilty	Barbra Streisand	Barry Gibb, Albhy Galuten & Karl Richardson, producers
1982	Double Fantasy	John Lennon & Yoko Ono	Jack Douglas, John Lennon & Yoko Ono, producers
1982	Mistaken Identity	Kim Carnes	Val Garay, producer
1982	Breakin' Away	Al Jarreau	Jay Graydon, producer
1982	The Dude	Quincy Jones	Quincy Jones, producer
1982	Gaucho	Steely Dan	Gary Katz, producer
1983	Toto IV	Toto	Toto, producers
1983	American Fool	John Cougar	John Mellencamp & Don Gehman, producers
1983	The Nightfly	Donald Fagen	Gary Katz, producer
1983	The Nylon Curtain	Billy Joel	Phil Ramone, producer
1983	Tug of War	Paul McCartney	George Martin, producer
1984	Thriller	Michael Jackson	Michael Jackson & Quincy Jones, producers
1984	Let's Dance	David Bowie	David Bowie & Nile Rodgers, producers
1984	An Innocent Man	Billy Joel	Phil Ramone, producer
1984	Synchronicity	The Police	The Police & Hugh Padgham, producers
1984	Flashdance: Original Soundtrack from the Motion Picture	Various Artists	Irene Cara, Shandi Sinnamon, Helen St. John, Karen Kamon, Joe Esposito, Laura Branigan, Donna Summer, Cycle V, Kim Carnes & Michael Sembello, featured artists; Giorgio Moroder, producer
1985	Can't Slow Down	Lionel Richie	James Anthony Carmichael & Lionel Richie, producers
1985	She's So Unusual	Cyndi Lauper	Rick Chertoff, producer
1985	Purple Rain	Prince & The Revolution	Prince & The Revolution, producers
1985	Born in the U.S.A.	Bruce Springsteen	Jon Landau, Steven Van Zandt, Chuck Plotkin & Bruce Springsteen, producers
1985	Private Dancer	Tina Turner	
1986	No Jacket Required	Phil Collins	Hugh Padgham & Phil Collins, producers
1986	Brothers in Arms	Dire Straits	Neil Dorfsman & Mark Knopfler, producers
1986	Whitney Houston	Whitney Houston	Clive Davis, producer
1986	The Dream of the Blue Turtles	Sting	Sting & Rick Chertoff, producers
1986	We Are the World	USA for Africa	Quincy Jones, producer
1987	Graceland	Paul Simon	Paul Simon, producer
1987	So	Peter Gabriel	Peter Gabriel & Daniel Lanois, producers
1987	Control	Janet Jackson	Janet Jackson, Jimmy Jam & Terry Lewis producers
1987	The Broadway Album	Barbra Streisand	Peter Matz, producer
1987	Back in the High Life	Steve Winwood	Russ Titelman & Steve Winwood, producers
1988	The Joshua Tree	U2	Brian Eno & Daniel Lanois, producers
1988	Whitney	Whitney Houston	Narada Michael Walden, producer
1988	Bad	Michael Jackson	Michael Jackson & Quincy Jones, producers
1988	Trio	Dolly Parton, Linda Ronstadt & Emmylou Harris	George Massenburg, producer
1988	Sign o' the Times	Prince	Prince, producer
1989	Faith	George Michael	George Michael, producer
1989	Tracy Chapman	Tracy Chapman	David Kershenbaum, producer
1989	Simple Pleasures	Bobby McFerrin	Linda Goldstein, producer
1989	...Nothing Like the Sun	Sting	Sting & Neil Dorfsman, producers
1989	Roll with It	Steve Winwood	Steve Winwood & Tom Lord-Alge, producers

=== 1990s ===
Year	Album	Artist(s)	Production team
1990	Nick of Time	Bonnie Raitt	Don Was, producer
1990	The End of the Innocence	Don Henley	Don Henley & Danny Kortchmar, producers
1990	The Raw & the Cooked	Fine Young Cannibals	Fine Young Cannibals, producers
1990	Full Moon Fever	Tom Petty	Jeff Lynne, Tom Petty & Mike Campbell, producers
1990	Traveling Wilburys Vol. 1	Traveling Wilburys	Otis Wilbury & Nelson Wilbury, producers
1991	Back on the Block	Quincy Jones	Quincy Jones, producer
1991	...But Seriously	Phil Collins	Phil Collins & Hugh Padgham, producers
1991	Mariah Carey	Mariah Carey	Mariah Carey, Rhett Lawrence, Ric Wake, Narada Michael Walden, Ben Margulies & Walter Afanasieff, producers
1991	Please Hammer Don't Hurt 'Em	MC Hammer	Felton Pilate & James Earley, producers
1991	Wilson Phillips	Wilson Phillips	Glen Ballard, producer
1992	Unforgettable... with Love	Natalie Cole	Andre Fischer, David Foster & Tommy LiPuma, producers
1992	Heart in Motion	Amy Grant	Keith Thomas, Brown Bannister & Michael Omartian, producers
1992	Luck of the Draw	Bonnie Raitt	Don Was & Bonnie Raitt, producers
1992	Out of Time	R.E.M.	Scott Litt & R.E.M., producers
1992	The Rhythm of the Saints	Paul Simon	Paul Simon, producer
1993	Unplugged	Eric Clapton	Russ Titelman, producer
1993	Achtung Baby	U2	Daniel Lanois, Brian Eno & Steve Lillywhite, producers
1993	Beauty and the Beast	Various Artists	Howard Ashman, Alan Menken & Walter Afanasieff, producers
1993	Diva	Annie Lennox	Stephen Lipson, producer
1993	Ingenue	k.d. lang	Greg Penny, Ben Mink & k.d. lang, producers
1994	The Bodyguard – Original Soundtrack Album (Note: Only Houston and the producers of her tracks received the award. None of the other artists who appeared on The Bodyguard soundtrack (Kenny G, Aaron Neville, Lisa Stansfield, The S.O.U.L. S.Y.S.T.E.M., Curtis Stigers, Joe Cocker, Sass Jordan, and the uncredited instrumental ensemble that performed Alan Silvestri's theme) shared in the award, nor did the producers of these other artists' tracks (other than those who also produced Houston's tracks).)	Whitney Houston	David Foster, Whitney Houston, Narada Michael Walden, L.A. Reid, Babyface & BeBe Winans, producers
1994	Automatic for the People	R.E.M.	Scott Litt & R.E.M., producers
1994	Kamakiriad	Donald Fagen	Walter Becker, producer
1994	River of Dreams	Billy Joel	Danny Kortchmar, Billy Joel & Joe Nicolo, producers
1994	Ten Summoner's Tales	Sting	Hugh Padgham & Sting, producers
1995	MTV Unplugged	Tony Bennett	David Kahne, producer
1995	From the Cradle	Eric Clapton	Eric Clapton & Russ Titelman, producers
1995	Longing in Their Hearts	Bonnie Raitt	Bonnie Raitt & Don Was, producers
1995	Seal	Seal	Trevor Horn, producer
1995	The 3 Tenors in Concert 1994	José Carreras, Plácido Domingo & Luciano Pavarotti with Zubin Mehta	Tibor Rudas, producer
1996	Jagged Little Pill	Alanis Morissette	Glen Ballard, producer
1996	Daydream	Mariah Carey	Walter Afanasieff, Mariah Carey, Jermaine Dupri, Dave Hall, David Morales & Manuel Seal, producers
1996	HIStory: Past, Present and Future, Book I	Michael Jackson	Dallas Austin, Bill Bottrell, David Foster, Janet Jackson, Michael Jackson, Jimmy Jam & Terry Lewis, Rene Moore & Bruce Swedien, producers
1996	Relish	Joan Osborne	Rick Chertoff, producer
1996	Vitalogy	Pearl Jam	Brendan O'Brien & Pearl Jam, producers
1997	Falling into You	Celine Dion	Roy Bittan, Jeff Bova, David Foster, Humberto Gatica, Jean-Jacques Goldman, Rick Hahn, Dan Hill, John Jones, Aldo Nova, Rick Nowels, Steven Rinkoff, Billy Steinberg, Jim Steinman & Ric Wake, producers
1997	Mellon Collie and the Infinite Sadness	The Smashing Pumpkins	Billy Corgan, Flood & Alan Moulder, producers
1997	Odelay	Beck	Beck Hansen & Dust Brothers, producers
1997	The Score	The Fugees	Diamond D, Jerry "Te Bass" Duplessis, John Forté, Lauryn Hill, Shawn King, Prakazrel "Pras", Salaam Remi, Handel Tucker & Wyclef, producers
1997	Waiting to Exhale: Original Soundtrack Album	Various Artists	Babyface, producer
1998	Time Out of Mind	Bob Dylan	Daniel Lanois, producer
1998	The Day	Babyface	Babyface, producer
1998	Flaming Pie	Paul McCartney	Jeff Lynne, George Martin & Paul McCartney, producers
1998	OK Computer	Radiohead	Nigel Godrich & Radiohead, producers
1998	This Fire	Paula Cole	Paula Cole, producer
1999	The Miseducation of Lauryn Hill	Lauryn Hill	Lauryn Hill, producer; Commissioner Gordon, Matt Howe, Storm Jefferson, Ken Johnston, Tony Prendatt, Warren Riker, Chris Theis & Johnny Wyndrx, engineers/mixers
1999	Come on Over	Shania Twain	Robert John "Mutt" Lange, producer; Jeff Balding & Mike Shipley, engineers/mixers
1999	The Globe Sessions	Sheryl Crow	Sheryl Crow, producer; Tchad Blake, Trina Shoemaker & Andy Wallace, engineers/mixers
1999	Ray of Light	Madonna	Marius De Vries, Patrick Leonard, Madonna & William Orbit, producers; Jon Englesby, Pat McCarthy & David Reitzas, engineers/mixers
1999	Version 2.0	Garbage	Garbage, producers; Billy Bush, engineer/mixer

=== 2000s ===
Year	Album	Artist(s)	Production team
2000	Supernatural	Santana	Clive Davis, Jerry Duplessis, Dust Brothers, Alex González, Charles Goodan, Stephen M. Harris, Lauryn Hill, Art Hodge, Wyclef Jean, Fher Olvera, K. C. Porter, Dante Ross & Matt Serletic, producers; Mike Couzzi, Benny Faccone, Steve Farrone, Steve Fontano, David Frazer, Jim Gaines, John Gamble, Commissioner Gordon, Andy Grassi, John Karpowich, Glenn Kolotkin, Tom Lord-Alge, Jeff Poe, Tony Prendatt, Anton Pukshansky, Warren Riker, Jim Scott, John Seymour, Matty Spindel, T-Ray, Chris Theis, David Thoener & Alvaro Villagra, engineers/mixers
2000	FanMail	TLC	Dallas Austin, producer; Carlton Lynn, engineer/mixer
2000	Fly	Dixie Chicks	Blake Chancey & Paul Worley, producers; John Guess & Billy Sherrill, engineers/mixers
2000	Millennium	Backstreet Boys	Kristian Lundin, Max Martin, Rami Yacoub, Robert John "Mutt" Lange, Stephen Lipson, Timmy Allen, Mattias Gustafsson, Edwin "Tony" Nicholas & Eric Foster White, producers; Kristian Lundin, Max Martin, Bo Reimer, Daniel Boom, Rami Yacoub, Chris Trevett, George Spatta, Adam Barber, Heff Moraes, Dawn Reinholtz, Devon Kirkpatrick, Mick Guzauski, Stephen George, Adam Blackburn, John Bates & Carl Robinson, engineers/mixers
2000	When I Look in Your Eyes	Diana Krall	Tommy LiPuma & Johnny Mandel, producers; Al Schmitt, engineer/mixer
2001	Two Against Nature	Steely Dan	Walter Becker & Donald Fagen, producers; Phil Burnett, Roger Nichols, Dave Russell & Elliot Scheiner, engineers/mixers
2001	Kid A	Radiohead	Radiohead, producers; Nigel Godrich, engineer/mixer
2001	The Marshall Mathers LP	Eminem	Jeff Bass, Mark Bass, Dr. Dre, Eminem & The 45 King, producers; Rich Behrens, Mike Butler, Chris Conway, Rob Ebeling, Michelle Forbes, Richard Segal Huredia, Steve King, Aaron Lepley, James McCrone, Akane Nakamura & Lance Pierre, engineers/mixers
2001	Midnite Vultures	Beck	Beck Hansen, Dust Brothers, Tony Hoffer & Mickey Petralia, producers; Tony Hoffer, Mickey Petralia & Michael Patterson, engineers/mixers
2001	You're the One	Paul Simon	Paul Simon, producer; Andy Smith, engineer/mixer
2002	O Brother, Where Art Thou? – Soundtrack (Note: Other artists who appeared on soundtrack (James Carter and the Prisoners, Harry McClintock & The Stanley Brothers) were not included as their recordings long preceded the soundtrack; the only members of those acts still alive at that time were James Carter (the only "Prisoner" from the Alan Lomax recording who was located) and Ralph Stanley (separately credited for recording "O Death" specifically for the soundtrack). The Soggy Bottom Boys aren't credited as a group, but Dan Tyminski (the singing voice of George Clooney in the film) is credited as a member of Union Station, while the other two members (Harley Allen & Pat Enright) are credited individually. Chris Sharp, Mike Compton, Sam Bush & Stuart Duncan are not listed as lead or featured artists on any track, but were included for their instrumental credits on the album.)	Various Artists	Alison Krauss & Union Station, Chris Sharp, Chris Thomas King, Emmylou Harris, Gillian Welch, Harley Allen, John Hartford, Mike Compton, Norman Blake, Pat Enright, The Peasall Sisters, Ralph Stanley, Sam Bush, Stuart Duncan, The Cox Family, The Fairfield Four, The Whites & Tim Blake Nelson, featured artists; T Bone Burnett, producer; Mike Piersante & Peter Kurland, engineer/mixers; Gavin Lurssen, mastering engineer
2002	Acoustic Soul	India.Arie	India.Arie, Mark Batson, Carlos "Six July" Broady, Blue Miller & Bob Power, producers; Mark Batson, Carlos "Six July" Broady, Kevin Haywood, Avery Johnson, George Karas, Jim Lightman, Blue Miller, Mark Niemiec, Bob Power, Mike Shipley, Alvin Speights, Mike Tocci & Dave Way, engineers/mixers
2002	All That You Can't Leave Behind	U2	Brian Eno & Daniel Lanois, producers; Brian Eno, Steve Fitzmaurice, Julian Gallagher, Mike Hedges, Daniel Lanois, Steve Lillywhite, Tim Palmer, Richard Rainey & Richard Stannard, engineers/mixers
2002	Love and Theft	Bob Dylan	Jack Frost, producer; Chris Shaw, engineer/mixer
2002	Stankonia	OutKast	Earthtone III, Organized Noize & Antonio "LA" Reid, producers; Jarvis Blackshear, Leslie Brathwaite, Josh Butler, Ralph Cacciurri, John Frye, Mark "DJ Exit" Goodchild, Carl Mo, Kevin Parker, Neal H. Poguep, Richard H. Segal, Kenneth Stallworth, Matt Still, Jason Stokes, Bernasky Wall & Derrick Williams, engineers/mixers
2003	Come Away with Me	Norah Jones	Norah Jones, Arif Mardin, Jay Newland & Craig Street, producers; S. Husky Huskolds & Jay Newland, engineers/mixers; Ted Jensen, mastering engineer
2003	The Eminem Show	Eminem	Jeff Bass, Dr. Dre, Eminem & Denaun Porter, producers; Steve Baughman, Mauricio "Veto" Iragorri & Steve King, engineers/mixers; Brian "Big Bass" Gardner, mastering engineer
2003	Home	Dixie Chicks	Dixie Chicks & Lloyd Maines, producers; Gary Paczosa, engineer/mixer; Robert Hadley & Doug Sax, mastering engineers
2003	Nellyville	Nelly	Jason "Jay E" Epperson, Just Blaze, The Neptunes, The Trackboyz, Ryan Bowser, Antoine "Bam" Macon & Waiel "Wally" Yaghnam, producers; Steve Eigner, Brian Garten, Russ Giraud, Gimel "Young Guru" Keaton, Greg Morgenstein, Matt Still & Rich Travali, engineers/mixers; Herb Powers, mastering engineer
2003	The Rising	Bruce Springsteen	Brendan O'Brien, producer; Nick Didia & Brendan O'Brien, engineers/mixers; Bob Ludwig, mastering engineer
2004	Speakerboxxx/The Love Below	OutKast	André 3000 & Antwon "Big Boi" Patton, producers; Vincent Alexander, Chris Carmouche, Kevin "KD" Davis, Reggie Dozier, John Frye, Robert Hannon, Padraic Kernin, Moka Nagatani, Pete Novak, Brian Paturalski, Neal Pogue, Dexter Simmons, Matt Still & Darrell Thorp, engineers/mixers; Brian Gardner & Bernie Grundman, mastering engineers
2004	Elephant	The White Stripes	Jack White, producer; Liam Watson & Jack White, engineers/mixers; Noel Summerville, mastering engineer
2004	Fallen	Evanescence	Dave Fortman & Ben Moody, producers; Jay Baumgardner, Dave Fortman & Jeremy Parker, engineers/mixers; Ted Jensen, mastering engineer
2004	Justified	Justin Timberlake	Brian McKnight, The Neptunes, Scott Storch, Timbaland & The Underdogs, producers; Andrew Coleman, Jimmy Douglass, Şerban Ghenea, Dabling Harward, Steve Penny, Dave "Hard Drive" Pensado, Dave "Natural Love" Russell, Timbaland & Chris Wood, engineers/mixers; Herb Powers Jr., mastering engineer
2004	Under Construction	Missy Elliott	Craig Brockman, Missy "Misdemeanor" Elliott, Erroll "Poppi" McCalla, Nisan & Timbaland, producers; Jeff Allen, Carlos "El Loco" Bedoya, Josh Butler, Senator Jimmy D, Guru, Timbaland & Mike Wilson, engineers/mixers; Herb Powers Jr., mastering engineer
2005	Genius Loves Company	Ray Charles & Various Artists	John Burk, Terry Howard, Don Mizell, Phil Ramone & Herbert Waltl, producers; Robert Fernandez, John Harris, Terry Howard, Pete Karam, Joel Moss, Al Schmitt & Ed Thacker, engineers/mixers; Robert Hadley & Doug Sax, mastering engineers
2005	American Idiot	Green Day	Billie Joe Armstrong, Rob Cavallo, Mike Dirnt & Tré Cool, producers; Chris Lord-Alge & Doug McKean, engineers/mixers; Ted Jensen, mastering engineer
2005	The College Dropout	Kanye West	Kanye West, producer; Eddy Schreyer, engineer/mixer; Eddy Schreyer, mastering engineer
2005	Confessions	Usher	Bobby Ross Avila, Valdez Brantley, Bryan-Michael Cox, Vidal Davis, Destro Music, Jermaine Dupri, Andre Harris, Rich Harrison, IZ, Jimmy Jam, Just Blaze, James Lackey, Terry Lewis, Juan Johnny Najera, Pro J, Usher Raymond, Jonathan "Lil Jon" Smith, Aaron Spears, Arthur Strong, Robin Thicke & James "Big Jim" Wright, producers; Ian Cross, Kevin "KD" Davis, Vidal Davis, Vince DeLorenzo, Jermaine Dupri, Blake Eisman, Brian Frye, John Frye, Şerban Ghenea, Andre Harris, John Horesco IV, Ken Lewis, Matt Marrin, Manny Marroquin, Tony Maserati, Pro J, Donnie Scantz, Jon Smeltz, Jonathan "Lil Jon" Smith, Phil Tan, The Trak Starz, Mark Vinten & Ryan West, engineers/mixers; Herb Powers, mastering engineer
2005	The Diary of Alicia Keys	Alicia Keys	Kerry "Krucial" Brothers, Vidal Davis, Easy Mo Bee, Andre Harris, Alicia Keys, Kumasi, Timbaland, Kanye West & Dwayne "D. Wigg" Wiggins, producers; Tony Black, Kerry "Krucial" Brothers, Vincent Dilorenzo, Russ Elevado, Manny Marroquin, Walter Millsap III, Ann Mincieli & Pat Viala, engineers/mixers; Herb Powers, Jr., mastering engineer
2006	How to Dismantle an Atomic Bomb	U2	Brian Eno, Flood, Daniel Lanois, Jacknife Lee, Steve Lillywhite & Chris Thomas, producers; Greg Collins, Flood, Carl Glanville, Simon Gogerly, Nellee Hooper, Jacknife Lee & Steve Lillywhite, engineers/mixers; Arnie Acosta, mastering engineer
2006	Chaos and Creation in the Backyard	Paul McCartney	Nigel Godrich, producer; Darrell Thorp, engineer/mixer; Alan Yoshida, mastering engineer
2006	The Emancipation of Mimi	Mariah Carey	Mariah Carey, Bryan-Michael Cox, Jermaine Dupri, Young Genius, Scram Jones, The Legendary Traxster, LRoc, The Neptunes, James Poyser, Manuel Seal, Kanye West & James "Big Jim" Wright, producers; Dana Jon Chappelle, Jermaine Dupri, Bryan Frye, Brian Garten, John Horesco IV, Manny Marroquin, Mike Pierce, Phil Tan & Pat "Pat 'Em Down" Viala, engineers/mixers; Herb Powers, Jr., mastering engineer
2006	Late Registration	Kanye West	Jon Brion, Warryn "Baby Dubb" Campbell, Just Blaze, Devo Springsteen & Kanye West, producers; Craig Bauer, Tom Biller, Andrew Dawson, Mike Dean, Anthony Kilhoffer, Manny Marroquin, Richard Reitz & Brian Sumner, engineers/mixers; Vlado Meller, mastering engineer
2006	Love. Angel. Music. Baby.	Gwen Stefani	André 3000, Dallas Austin, Dr. Dre, Nellee Hooper, Jimmy Jam, Tony Kanal, Terry Lewis, The Neptunes, Linda Perry & Johnny Vulture, producers; André 3000, Andrew Coleman, Greg Collins, Ian Cross, Dr. Dre, John Frye, Simon Gogerly, Mauricio "Veto" Iragorri, Matt Marin, Colin "Dog" Mitchell, Pete Novak, Ian Rossiter, Rick Sheppard, Mark "Spike" Stent, Phil Tan & Johnny Vulture, engineers/mixers; Brian "Big Bass" Gardner, mastering engineer
2007	Taking the Long Way	Dixie Chicks	Rick Rubin, producer; Richard Dodd, Jim Scott & Chris Testa, engineers/mixers; Richard Dodd, mastering engineer
2007	Continuum	John Mayer	Steve Jordan & John Mayer, producers; John Alagia, Michael Brauer, Joe Ferla, Chad Franscoviak, Manny Marroquin & Dave O'Donnell, engineers/mixers; Greg Calbi, mastering engineer
2007	FutureSex/LoveSounds	Justin Timberlake	Danja, Jawbreakers, Rick Rubin, Timbaland & Justin Timberlake, producers; Jimmy Douglass, Şerban Ghenea, Padraic Kerin, Jason Lader, Andrew Scheps, Timbaland & Ethan Willoughby, engineers/mixers; Herb Powers, Jr., mastering engineer
2007	St. Elsewhere	Gnarls Barkley	Danger Mouse, producer; Ben H. Allen, Danger Mouse & Kennie Takahashi, engineers/mixers; Mike Lazer, mastering engineer
2007	Stadium Arcadium	Red Hot Chili Peppers	Rick Rubin, producer; Ryan Hewitt, Mark Linette & Andrew Scheps, engineers/mixers; Vlado Meller, mastering engineer
2008	River: The Joni Letters	Herbie Hancock	Leonard Cohen, Norah Jones, Joni Mitchell, Corinne Bailey Rae, Luciana Souza & Tina Turner, featured artists; Herbie Hancock & Larry Klein, producers; Helik Hadar, engineer/mixer; Bernie Grundman, mastering engineer
2008	Back to Black	Amy Winehouse	Mark Ronson & Salaam Remi, producers; Tom Elmhirst, Gary Noble & Franklin Socorro, engineers/mixers; Mark Ronson, mastering engineer
2008	Echoes, Silence, Patience & Grace	Foo Fighters	Gil Norton, producer; Adrian Bushby & Rich Costey, engineers/mixers; Brian Gardner, mastering engineer
2008	Graduation	Kanye West	Dwele, Lil Wayne, Mos Def & T-Pain, featured artists; Warryn "Baby Dubb" Campbell, Eric Hudson, Brian "Allday" Miller, Nottz, Patrick "Plain Pat" Reynolds, Gee Roberson, Toomp & Kanye West, producers; Bruce Beuchner, Andrew Dawson, Mike Dean, Anthony Kilhoffer, Greg Koller, Manny Marroquin, Nottz Raw, Tony Rey, Seiji Sekine, Paul Sheehy & D. Sloan, engineers/mixers; Vlado Meller, mastering engineer
2008	These Days	Vince Gill	John Anderson, Guy Clark, Rodney Crowell, Diana Krall & The Del McCoury Band, featured artists; Vince Gill, John Hobbs & Justin Niebank, producers; Neal Cappellino & Justin Niebank, engineers/mixers; Adam Ayan, mastering engineer
2009	Raising Sand	Robert Plant & Alison Krauss	T Bone Burnett, producer; Mike Piersante, engineer/mixer; Gavin Lurssen, mastering engineer
2009	In Rainbows	Radiohead	Nigel Godrich, producer; Nigel Godrich, Dan Grech-Marguerat, Hugo Nicolson & Richard Woodcraft, engineers/mixers; Bob Ludwig, mastering engineer
2009	Tha Carter III	Lil Wayne	Babyface, Brisco, Fabolous, Jay-Z, Kidd Kidd, Busta Rhymes, Juelz Santana, D. Smith, Static Major, T-Pain & Bobby Valentino, featured artists; Alchemist, David Banner, Vaushaun "Maestro" Brooks, Cool & Dre, Andrews "Drew" Correa, Shondrae "Mr. Bangladesh" Crawford, Darius "Deezle" Harrison, Jim Jonsin, Mousa, Pro Jay, Rodnae, Skillz & Play, D. Smith, Swizz Beatz, Robin Thicke, T-Pain & Kanye West, producers; Angel Aponte, Joshua Berkman, Andrew Dawson, Joe G, Darius "Deezle" Harrison, Fabian Marasciullo, Miguel Scott, Robin Thicke, Julian Vasquez & Gina Victoria, engineers/mixers; Vlado Meller, mastering engineer
2009	Viva la Vida or Death and All His Friends	Coldplay	Markus Dravs, Brian Eno & Rik Simpson, producers; Michael H. Brauer, Markus Dravs, John O'Mahoney, Rik Simpson & Andy Wallace, engineers/mixers; Bob Ludwig, mastering engineer
2009	Year of the Gentleman	Ne-Yo	Chuck Harmony, Ne-Yo, Polow Da Don, StarGate, Stereotypes, Syience, Shea Taylor & Shomari "Sho" Wilson, producers; Kirven Arrington, Jeff Chestek, Kevin "KD" Davis, Mikkel Eriksen, Jaymz Hardy Martin, III, Geno Regist, Phil Tan & Tony Terrebonne, engineers/mixers; Herb Powers, Jr., mastering engineer

=== 2010s ===
Year	Album	Artist(s)	Production team
2010	Fearless	Taylor Swift	Colbie Caillat, featured artist; Nathan Chapman & Taylor Swift, producers; Chad Carlson, Nathan Chapman & Justin Niebank, engineers/mixers; Hank Williams, mastering engineer
2010	Big Whiskey & the GrooGrux King	Dave Matthews Band	Jeff Coffin, Tim Reynolds & Rashawn Ross, featured artists; Rob Cavallo, producer; Chris Lord-Alge & Doug McKean, engineers/mixers; Ted Jensen, mastering engineer
2010	The E.N.D.	Black Eyed Peas	Apl.de.ap, Jean Baptiste, Printz Board, DJ Replay, Funkagenda, David Guetta, Keith Harris, Mark Knight, Poet Name Life, Frederick Riesterer & will.i.am, producers; Dylan "3D" Dresdow, Padraic "Padlock" Kerin & will.i.am, engineers/mixers; Chris Bellman, mastering engineer
2010	The Fame	Lady Gaga	Flo Rida, Colby O'Donis & Space Cowboy, featured artists; Brian & Josh, Rob Fusari, Martin Kierszenbaum, RedOne & Space Cowboy, producers; 4Mil, Robert Orton, RedOne, Dave Russell & Tony Ugval, engineers/mixers; Gene Grimaldi, mastering engineer
2010	I Am... Sasha Fierce	Beyoncé	Shondrae "Mr. Bangladesh" Crawford, Ian Dench, D-Town, Toby Gad, Sean Garrett, Amanda Ghost, Jim Jonsin, Beyoncé Knowles, Rico Love, Dave McCracken, Terius Nash, Radio Killa, Stargate, Christopher "Tricky" Stewart, Ryan Tedder & Wayne Wilkins, producers; Jim Caruana, Mikkel S. Eriksen, Toby Gad, Kuk Harrell, Jim Jonsin, Jaycen Joshua, Dave Pensado, Radio Killa, Mark "Spike" Stent, Ryan Tedder, Brian "B-LUV" Thomas, Marcos Tovar, Miles Walker & Wayne Wilkins, engineers/mixers; Tom Coyne, mastering engineer
2011	The Suburbs	Arcade Fire	Arcade Fire & Markus Dravs, producers; Arcade Fire, Mark Lawson & Craig Silvey, engineers/mixers; Mark Lawson, mastering engineer
2011	The Fame Monster	Lady Gaga	Beyoncé, featured artist; Ron Fair, Fernando Garibay, Tal Herzberg, Rodney Jerkins, Lady Gaga, RedOne, Teddy Riley & Space Cowboy, producers; Eelco Bakker, Christian Delano, Mike Donaldson, Paul Foley, Tal Herzberg, Rodney Jerkins, Hisashi Mizoguchi, Robert Orton, Dan Parry, Jack Joseph Puig, RedOne, Teddy Riley, Dave Russel, Johnny Severin, Space Cowboy, Mark Stent, Jonas Wetling & Frank Wolff, engineers/mixers; Gene Grimaldi, mastering engineer
2011	Need You Now	Lady Antebellum	Lady Antebellum & Paul Worley, producers; Clarke Schleicher, engineer/mixer; Andrew Mendelson, mastering engineer
2011	Recovery	Eminem	Kobe, Lil Wayne, Pink & Rihanna, featured artists; Alex Da Kid, Victor Alexander, Boi-1da, Nick Brongers, Dwayne "Supa Dups" Chin-Quee, DJ Khalil, Dr. Dre, Eminem, Jason Gilbert, Havoc, Emile Haynie, Jim Jonsin, Just Blaze, Magnedo7, Mr. Porter, Robert Reyes, Makeba Riddick & Script Shepherd, producers; Alex Da Kid, Dwayne "Supa Dups" Chin-Quee, Kal "Boogie" Dellaportas, Dr. Dre, Eminem, Mauricio "Veto" Iragorri, Just Blaze, Robert Marks, Alex Merzin, Matthew Samuels, Joe Strange, Mike Strange & Ryan West, engineers/mixers; Brian "Big Bass" Gardner, mastering engineer
2011	Teenage Dream	Katy Perry	Snoop Dogg, featured artist; Ammo, Benny Blanco, Dr. Luke, Kuk Harrell, Max Martin, Stargate, C. "Tricky" Stewart, Sandy Vee & Greg Wells, producers; Steve Churchyard, Mikkel S. Eriksen, Şerban Ghenea, John Hanes, Sam Holland, Jaycen Joshua, Damien Lewis, Chris O'Ryan, Carlos Oyanedel, Paris, Phil Tan, Brain Thomas, Lewis Tozour, Miles Walker, Emily Wright & Andrew Wuepper, engineers/mixers; Brian Gardner, mastering engineer
2012	21	Adele	Jim Abbiss, Adele Adkins, Paul Epworth, Rick Rubin, Fraser T Smith, Ryan Tedder & Dan Wilson, producers; Jim Abbiss, Philip Allen, Beatriz Artola, Ian Dowling, Tom Elmhirst, Greg Fidelman, Dan Parry, Steve Price, Mark Rankin, Andrew Scheps, Fraser T. Smith & Ryan Tedder, engineers/mixers; Tom Coyne, mastering engineer
2012	Born This Way	Lady Gaga	Paul Blair, DJ Snake, Fernando Garibay, Lady Gaga, Robert John "Mutt" Lange, Jeppe Laursen, RedOne & Clinton Sparks, producers; Fernando Garibay, Lady Gaga, Bill Malina, Trevor Muzzy, RedOne, Dave Russell, Justin Shirley Smith, Horace Ward & Tom Ware, engineers/mixers; Gene Grimaldi, mastering engineer
2012	Doo-Wops & Hooligans	Bruno Mars	B.o.B, Cee Lo Green & Damian Marley, featured artists; Dwayne "Supa Dups" Chin-Quee, Needlz & The Smeezingtons, producers; Ari Levine & Manny Marroquin, engineers/mixers; Stephen Marcussen, mastering engineer
2012	Loud	Rihanna	Drake, Eminem & Nicki Minaj, featured artists; Ester Dean, Alex Da Kid, Kuk Harrell, Mel & Mus, Awesome Jones, Makeba Riddick, The Runners, Sham, Soundz, Stargate, Chris "Tricky" Stewart, Sandy Vee & Willy Will, producers; Ariel Chobaz, Cary Clark, Mikkel S. Eriksen, Alex Da Kid, Josh Gudwin, Kuk Harrell, Jaycen Joshua, Manny Marroquin, Dana Nielsen, Chad "C-Note" Roper, Noah "40" Shebib, Corey Shoemaker, Jay Stevenson, Mike Strange, Phil Tan, Brian "B-Luv" Thomas, Marcos Tovar, Sandy Vee, Jeff "Supa Jeff" Villanueva, Miles Walker & Andrew Wuepper, engineers/mixers; Chris Gehringer, mastering engineer
2012	Wasting Light	Foo Fighters	Butch Vig, producer; James Brown & Alan Moulder, engineers/mixers; Joe LaPorta & Emily Lazar, mastering engineers
2013	Babel	Mumford & Sons	Markus Dravs, producer; Robin Baynton & Ruadhri Cushnan, engineers/mixers; Bob Ludwig, mastering engineer
2013	Blunderbuss	Jack White	Jack White, producer; Vance Powell & Jack White, engineers/mixers; Bob Ludwig, mastering engineer
2013	Channel Orange	Frank Ocean	André 3000, John Mayer & Earl Sweatshirt, featured artists; Om'Mas Keith, Malay, Frank Ocean & Pharrell Williams, producers; Calvin Bailif, Andrew Coleman, Jeff Ellis, Doug Fenske, Om'Mas Keith, Malay, Frank Ocean, Philip Scott, Mark "Spike" Stent, Pat Thrall, Ken Oriole, Marcos Tovar & Vic Wainstein, engineers/mixers; Vlado Meller, mastering engineer
2013	El Camino	The Black Keys	The Black Keys & Danger Mouse, producers; Tchad Blake, Tom Elmhirst & Kennie Takahashi, engineers/mixers; Brian Lucey, mastering engineer
2013	Some Nights	Fun.	Janelle Monáe, featured artist; Jeff Bhasker, Emile Haynie, Jake One & TommyD, producers; Jeff Bhasker, Pete Bischoff, Jeff Chestek, Andrew Dawson, Emile Haynie, Manny Marroquin, Sonny Pinnar & Stuart White, engineers/mixers; Chris Gehringer, mastering engineer
2014	Random Access Memories	Daft Punk	Julian Casablancas, DJ Falcon, Todd Edwards, Chilly Gonzales, Giorgio Moroder, Panda Bear, Nile Rodgers, Paul Williams & Pharrell Williams, featured artists; Thomas Bangalter, Julian Casablancas, Guy-Manuel De Homem-Christo, DJ Falcon & Todd Edwards, producers; Peter Franco, Mick Guzauski, Florian Lagatta, Guillaume Le Braz & Daniel Lerner, engineers/mixers; Bob Ludwig, mastering engineer
2014	The Blessed Unrest	Sara Bareilles	Sara Bareilles, Mark Endert & John O'Mahony, producers; Jeremy Darby, Mark Endert & John O'Mahony, engineers/mixers; Greg Calbi, mastering engineer
2014	Good Kid, M.A.A.D City	Kendrick Lamar	Mary J. Blige, Dr. Dre, Drake, Jay Rock, Jay-Z, MC Eiht & Anna Wise, featured artists; DJ Dahi, Hit-Boy, Skhye Hutch, Just Blaze, Like, Terrace Martin, Dawaun Parker, Pharrell Williams, Rahki, Scoop DeVille, Sounwave, Jack Splash, Tabu, Tha Bizness & T-Minus, producers; Derek Ali, Dee Brown, Dr. Dre, James Hunt, Mauricio "Veto" Iragorri, Mike Larson, Jared Scott, Jack Splash & Andrew Wright, engineers/mixers; Mike Bozzi & Brian Gardner, mastering engineers
2014	The Heist	Macklemore & Ryan Lewis	Ab-Soul, Ben Bridwell, Ray Dalton, Eighty4 Fly, Hollis, Mary Lambert, Buffalo Madonna, Evan Roman, Schoolboy Q, Allen Stone, The Teaching & Wanz, featured artists; Ryan Lewis, producer; Ben Haggerty, Ryan Lewis, Amos Miller, Reed Ruddy & Pete Stewart, engineers/mixers; Brian Gardner, mastering engineer
2014	Red	Taylor Swift	Gary Lightbody & Ed Sheeran, featured artists; Jeff Bhasker, Nathan Chapman, Dann Huff, Jacknife Lee, Max Martin, Shellback, Taylor Swift, Butch Walker & Dan Wilson, producers; Joe Baldridge, Sam Bell, Matt Bishop, Chad Carlson, Nathan Chapman, Şerban Ghenea, John Hanes, Sam Holland, Michael Ilbert, Taylor Johnson, Jacknife Lee, Steve Marcantonio, Manny Marroquin, Justin Niebank, John Rausch, Eric Robinson, Pawel Sek, Jake Sinclair, Mark "Spike" Stent & Andy Thompson, engineers/mixers; Tom Coyne & Hank Williams, mastering engineers
2015	Morning Phase	Beck	Beck Hansen, producer; Tom Elmhirst, David Greenbaum, Florian Lagatta, Cole Marsden Greif-Neill, Robbie Nelson, Darrell Thorp, Cassidy Turbin & Joe Visciano, engineers/mixers; Bob Ludwig, mastering engineer
2015	Beyoncé	Beyoncé	Chimamanda Ngozi Adichie, Drake, Jay-Z & Frank Ocean, featured artists; Ammo, Boots, James Fauntleroy, Noel "Detail" Fisher, Jerome Harmon, Hit-Boy, Beyoncé Knowles, Terius "The-Dream" Nash, Caroline Polachek, Rey Reel, Noah "40" Shebib, Ryan Tedder, Timbaland, Justin Timberlake, Key Wane, Pharrell Williams & Patrick Wimberly, producers; Boots, Noel Cadastre, Noel "Gadget" Campbell, Rob Cohen, Andrew Coleman, Chris Godbey, Justin Hergett, James Krausse, Mike Larson, Jonathan Lee, Tony Maserati, Ann Mincieli, Caroline Polachek, Andrew Scheps, Bart Schoudel, Noah "40" Shebib, Ryan Tedder, Stuart White & Jordan "DJ Swivel" Young, engineers/mixers; Tom Coyne, James Krausse & Aya Merrill, (mastering engineers); Justin Timberlake, Justin Timbaland, Pharrell Williams, Sia, Frank Ocean, The-Dream, Miguel, and James Fauntleroy, songwriters
2015	Girl	Pharrell Williams	Alicia Keys & Justin Timberlake, featured artists; Pharrell Williams, producer; Leslie Brathwaite, Adrian Breakspear, Andrew Coleman, Jimmy Douglas, Hart Gunther, Mick Guzauski, Florian Lagatta, Mike Larson, Stephanie McNally, Alan Meyerson, Ann Mincieli & Kenta Yonesaka, engineers/mixers; Bob Ludwig, mastering engineer
2015	In the Lonely Hour	Sam Smith	Steve Fitzmaurice, Komi, Howard Lawrence, Zane Lowe, Mojam, Jimmy Napes, Naughty Boy, Fraser T. Smith, Two Inch Punch & Eg White, producers; Michael Angelo, Graham Archer, Steve Fitzmaurice, Simon Hale, Darren Heelis, James Murray, Jimmy Napes, Mustafa Omer, Dan Parry, Steve Price & Eg White, engineers/mixers; Tom Coyne & Stuart Hawkes, mastering engineers
2015	x	Ed Sheeran	Jeff Bhasker, Benny Blanco, Jake Gosling, Johnny McDaid, Rick Rubin & Pharrell Williams, producers; Andrew Coleman, Jake Gosling, Matty Green, William Hicks, Tyler Sam Johnson, Jason Lader, Johnny McDaid, Chris Sclafani, Mark Stent & Geoff Swan, engineers/mixers; Stuart Hawkes, mastering engineer
2016	1989	Taylor Swift	Jack Antonoff, Nathan Chapman, Imogen Heap, Max Martin, Mattman & Robin, Ali Payami, Shellback, Taylor Swift, Ryan Tedder & Noel Zancanella, producers; Jack Antonoff, Mattias Bylund, Smith Carlson, Nathan Chapman, Şerban Ghenea, John Hanes, Imogen Heap, Sam Holland, Michael Ilbert, Brendan Morawski, Laura Sisk & Ryan Tedder, engineers/mixers; Tom Coyne, mastering engineer
2016	Beauty Behind the Madness	The Weeknd	Lana Del Rey, Labrinth & Ed Sheeran, featured artists; DannyBoyStyles, Ben Diehl, Labrinth, Mano, Max Martin, Stephan Moccio, Carlo Montagnese, Ali Payami, Che Pope, Jason Quenneville, Peter Svensson, Abel Tesfaye & Kanye West, producers; Jay Paul Bicknell, Mattias Bylund, Şerban Ghenea, Noah Goldstein, John Hanes, Sam Holland, Jean Marie Horvat, Carlo Montagnese, Jason Quenneville & Dave Reitzas, engineers/mixers; Tom Coyne & Dave Kutch, mastering engineers
2016	Sound & Color	Alabama Shakes	Alabama Shakes & Blake Mills, producers; Shawn Everett, engineer/mixer; Bob Ludwig, mastering engineer
2016	To Pimp a Butterfly	Kendrick Lamar	Bilal, George Clinton, James Fauntleroy, Ronald Isley, Rapsody, Snoop Dogg, Thundercat & Anna Wise, featured artists; Taz Arnold, Boi-1da, Ronald Colson, Larrance Dopson, Flying Lotus, Fredrik "Tommy Black" Halldin, Knxwledge, Koz, Lovedragon, Terrace Martin, Rahki, Sounwave, Tae Beast, Thundercat, Whoarei & Pharrell Williams, producers; Derek "MixedByAli" Ali, Thomas Burns, James "The White Black Man" Hunt, 9th Wonder & Matt Schaeffer, engineers/mixers; Mike Bozzi, mastering engineer
2016	Traveller	Chris Stapleton	Dave Cobb & Chris Stapleton, producers; Vance Powell, engineer/mixer; Pete Lyman, mastering engineer
2017	25	Adele	Danger Mouse, Samuel Dixon, Paul Epworth, Greg Kurstin, Max Martin, Ariel Rechtshaid, Shellback, The Smeezingtons & Ryan Tedder, producers; Julian Burg, Austen Jux Chandler, Cameron Craig, Samuel Dixon, Tom Elmhirst, Declan Gaffney, Şerban Ghenea, John Hanes, Emile Haynie, Jan Holzner, Michael Ilbert, Chris Kasych, Greg Kurstin, Charles Moniz, Liam Nolan, Alex Pasco, Mike Piersante, Ariel Rechtshaid, Rich Rich, Dave Schiffman, Joe Visciano & Matt Wiggins, engineers/mixers; Tom Coyne & Randy Merrill, mastering engineers
2017	Lemonade	Beyoncé	James Blake, Kendrick Lamar, The Weeknd & Jack White, featured artists; Vincent Berry II, Ben Billions, James Blake, BOOTS, Jonny Coffer, DannyBoyStyles, Mike Dean, Alex Delicata, Diplo, Derek Dixie, Kevin Garrett, Diana Gordon, HazeBanga, Hit-Boy, Just Blaze, King Henry, Beyoncé Knowles, Ezra Koenig, Jeremy McDonald, MeLo-X, Mike Will Made-It, Pluss & Jack White, producers; Mike Dean, Jaycen Joshua, Greg Koller, Tony Maserati, Lester Mendoza, Vance Powell, Joshua V. Smith & Stuart White, engineers/mixers; Dave Kutch, mastering engineer
2017	Purpose	Justin Bieber	Big Sean, Diplo, Halsey, Travis Scott & Skrillex, featured artists; The Audibles, Axident, Justin Bieber, Big Taste, Benny Blanco, Blood, Jason "Poo Bear" Boyd, Scott "Scooter" Braun, Mike Dean, Diplo, Gladius, Nico Hartikainen, Mark "The Mogul" Jackson, Steve James, Ian Kirkpatrick, Maejor, MdL, Skrillex, Jeremy Snyder & Soundz, producers; Simon Cohen, Diplo, Mark "Exit" Goodchild, Josh Gudwin, Jaycen Joshua, Manny Marroquin, Chris 'Tek' O'Ryan, Johannes Rassina, Gregg Rominiecki, Chris Sclafani, Skrillex, Dylan William & Andrew Wuepper, engineers/mixers; Tom Coyne & Randy Merrill, mastering engineers
2017	A Sailor's Guide to Earth	Sturgill Simpson	Sturgill Simpson, producer; Geoff Allan, David Ferguson & Sean Sullivan, engineers/mixers; Gavin Lurssen, mastering engineer
2017	Views	Drake	dvsn, Future, Kyla, PartyNextDoor, Rihanna & Wizkid, featured artists; Brian Alexander Morgan, Axlfolie, Beat Bully, Boi-1da, Cardo, Dwayne "Supa Dups" Chin-Quee, Daxz, DJ Dahi, Frank Dukes, Maneesh, Murda Beatz, Nineteen85, Ricci Riera, Allen Ritter, Noah "40" Shebib, Southside, Sevn Thomas, Jordan Ullman, Kanye West, Wizkid & Young Exclusive, producers; Noel Cadastre, Noel "Gadget" Campbell, Seth Firkins, David "Prep" Bijan Huges & Noah "40" Shebib, engineers/mixers; Chris Athens, mastering engineer
2018	24K Magic	Bruno Mars	Shampoo Press & Curl, producers; Şerban Ghenea, John Hanes & Charles Moniz, engineers/mixers; Christopher Brody Brown, James Fauntleroy, Philip Lawrence & Bruno Mars, songwriters; Tom Coyne, mastering engineer
2018	"Awaken, My Love!"	Childish Gambino	Donald Glover & Ludwig Göransson, producers; Bryan Carrigan, Chris Fogel, Donald Glover, Ludwig Göransson, Riley Mackin & Ruben Rivera, engineers/mixers; Donald Glover & Ludwig Göransson, songwriters; Bernie Grundman, mastering engineer
2018	Damn	Kendrick Lamar	DJ Dahi, Sounwave & Anthony Tiffith, producers; Derek "MixedByAli" Ali, James Hunt & Matt Schaeffer, engineers/mixers; Kendrick Duckworth, Dacoury Natche, Mark Spears & Anthony Tiffith, songwriters; Mike Bozzi, mastering engineer
2018	4:44	Jay-Z	Jay-Z & No I.D., producers; Jimmy Douglass & Gimel "Young Guru" Keaton, engineers/mixers; Shawn Carter & Dion Wilson, songwriters; Dave Kutch, mastering engineer
2018	Melodrama	Lorde	Jack Antonoff & Lorde, producers; Şerban Ghenea, John Hanes & Laura Sisk, engineers/mixers; Jack Antonoff & Ella Yelich-O'Connor, songwriters; Randy Merrill, mastering engineer
2019	Golden Hour	Kacey Musgraves	Ian Fitchuk, Kacey Musgraves & Daniel Tashian, producers; Craig Alvin & Shawn Everett, engineers/mixers; Ian Fitchuk, Kacey Musgraves & Daniel Tashian, songwriters; Greg Calbi & Steve Fallone, mastering engineers
2019	Beerbongs & Bentleys	Post Malone	Louis Bell & Post Malone, producers; Louis Bell & Manny Marroquin, engineers/mixers; Louis Bell & Austin Post, songwriters; Mike Bozzi, mastering engineer
2019	Black Panther: The Album, Music from and Inspired By	Various Artists	Kendrick Lamar, featured artist; Kendrick Duckworth & Sounwave, producers; Matt Schaeffer, engineer/mixer; Kendrick Duckworth & Mark Spears, songwriters; Mike Bozzi, mastering engineer
2019	By the Way, I Forgive You	Brandi Carlile	Dave Cobb & Shooter Jennings, producers; Dave Cobb & Eddie Spear, engineers/mixers; Brandi Carlile, Phil Hanseroth & Tim Hanseroth, songwriters; Pete Lyman, mastering engineer
2019	Dirty Computer	Janelle Monáe	Chuck Lightning & Janelle Monáe Robinson & Nate "Rocket" Wonder, producers; Mick Guzauski, Janelle Monáe Robinson & Nate "Rocket" Wonder, engineers/mixers; Nathaniel Irvin III, Charles Joseph II, Taylor Parks & Janelle Monáe Robinson, songwriters; Dave Kutch, mastering engineer
2019	H.E.R.	H.E.R.	Darhyl "Hey DJ" Camper Jr., David 'Swagg R'Celious' Harris, H.E.R., Walter Jones & Jeff Robinson, producers; Miki Tsutsumi, engineer/mixer; Darhyl Camper Jr. & H.E.R., songwriters; Dave Kutch, mastering engineer
2019	Invasion of Privacy	Cardi B	Craig Kallman, 30 Roc, Allen Ritter, Andrew Watt, Benny Blanco, Boi-1da, Cubeatz, DJ Mustard, Frank Dukes, J. White Did It, Keyz, Murda Beatz, Needlz, Scribz Riley, Tainy, & Vinylz, producers; Leslie Brathwaite & Evan LaRay, engineers/mixers; Belcalis Almanzar & Jorden Thorpe, songwriters; Colin Leonard, mastering engineer
2019	Scorpion	Drake	40, Allen Ritter, PartyNextDoor, Blaqnmild, Noel Cadastre, The 25th Hour, OB O'Brien, Boi-1da, Capo, Cardo, DJ Paul, DJ Premier, Jahaan Sweet, ModMaxx, Murda Beatz, No I.D., Nonstop da Hitman, Oogie Mane, Preme, Shaun Harris, Supah Mario, T-Minus, Tay Keith, TrapMoneyBenny, Jeffrey Rashad, TWhy Xclusive, Corey Litwin, Wallis Lane, & Yung Exclusive, producers; Noel Cadastre, Noel "Gadget" Campbell & Noah Shebib, engineers/mixers; Aubrey Graham & Noah Shebib, songwriters; Chris Athens, mastering engineer

=== 2020s ===
Year	Album	Artist(s)	Production team
2020	When We All Fall Asleep, Where Do We Go?	Billie Eilish	Finneas O'Connell, producer; Rob Kinelski & Finneas O'Connell, engineers/mixers; Billie Eilish O'Connell & Finneas O'Connell, songwriters; John Greenham, mastering engineer
2020	Cuz I Love You (Deluxe)	Lizzo	Ricky Reed, producer; Manny Marroquin & Ethan Shumaker, engineers/mixers; Eric Frederic & Melissa Jefferson, songwriters; Chris Gehringer, mastering engineer
2020	Father of the Bride	Vampire Weekend	Ezra Koenig & Ariel Rechtshaid, producers; John DeBold, Chris Kasych, Takemasa Kosaka, Ariel Rechtshaid & Hiroya Takayama, engineers/mixers; Ezra Koenig, songwriter; Emily Lazar, mastering engineer
2020	I, I	Bon Iver	Brad Cook, Chris Messina & Justin Vernon, producers; Zach Hansen & Chris Messina, engineers/mixers; BJ Burton, Brad Cook & Justin Vernon, songwriters; Greg Calbi, mastering engineer
2020	I Used to Know Her	H.E.R.	David "Swagg R'Celious" Harris, H.E.R., Walter Jones & Jeff Robinson, producers; Miki Tsutsumi, engineer/mixer; Sam Ashworth, Jeff "Gitty" Gitelman, David "Swagg R'Celious" Harris & H.E.R., songwriters; Colin Leonard, mastering engineer
2020	Norman Fucking Rockwell!	Lana Del Rey	Jack Antonoff & Lana Del Rey, producers; Jack Antonoff & Laura Sisk, engineers/mixers; Jack Antonoff & Lana Del Rey, songwriters; Chris Gehringer, mastering engineer
2020	7	Lil Nas X	Joe Grasso, engineer/mixer; Montero Lamar Hill, songwriter; Eric Lagg, mastering engineer
2020	Thank U, Next	Ariana Grande	Tommy Brown, Ilya, Max Martin & Victoria Monet, producers; Şerban Ghenea & Brendan Morawski, engineers/mixers; Tommy Brown, Ariana Grande, Savan Kotecha, Max Martin, Victoria Monet, Tayla Parx & Ilya Salmanzadeh, songwriters; Randy Merrill, mastering engineer
2021	Folklore	Taylor Swift	Joe Alwyn, Jack Antonoff, Aaron Dessner & Taylor Swift, producers; Jack Antonoff, Aaron Dessner, Şerban Ghenea, John Hanes, Jonathan Low & Laura Sisk, engineers/mixers; Aaron Dessner & Taylor Swift, songwriters; Randy Merrill, mastering engineer
2021	Black Pumas (Deluxe Edition)	Black Pumas	Jon Kaplan & Adrian Quesada, producers; Adrian Quesada, Jacob Sciba, Stuart Sikes & Erik Wofford, engineers/mixers; Eric Burton & Adrian Quesada, songwriters; JJ Golden, mastering engineer
2021	Chilombo	Jhené Aiko	Fisticuffs & Julian-Quán Việt Lê, producers; Fisticuffs, Julian-Quán Việt Lê, Zeke Mishanec, Christian Plata & Gregg Rominiecki, engineers/mixers; Jhené Aiko Efuru Chilombo, Julian-Quán Việt Lê, Maclean Robinson & Brian Keith Warfield, songwriters; Dave Kutch, mastering engineer
2021	Djesse Vol. 3	Jacob Collier	Jacob Collier, producer; Ben Bloomberg & Jacob Collier, engineers/mixers; Jacob Collier, songwriter; Chris Allgood & Emily Lazar, mastering engineers
2021	Everyday Life	Coldplay	Daniel Green, Bill Rahko & Rik Simpson, producers; Mark "Spike" Stent, engineer/mixer; Guy Berryman, Jonny Buckland, Will Champion & Chris Martin, songwriters; Emily Lazar, mastering engineer
2021	Future Nostalgia	Dua Lipa	Koz, producer; Josh Gudwin & Cameron Gower Poole, engineers/mixers; Clarence Coffee Jr. & Dua Lipa, songwriters; Chris Gehringer, mastering engineer
2021	Hollywood's Bleeding	Post Malone	Louis Bell & Frank Dukes, producers; Louis Bell & Manny Marroquin, engineers/mixers; Louis Bell, Adam Feeney, Austin Post & Billy Walsh, songwriters; Mike Bozzi, mastering engineer
2021	Women in Music Pt. III	Haim	Rostam Batmanglij, Danielle Haim & Ariel Rechtshaid, producers; Rostam Batmanglij, Jasmine Chen, John DeBold, Matt DiMona, Tom Elmhirst, Joey Messina-Doerning & Ariel Rechtshaid, engineers/mixers; Rostam Batmanglij, Alana Haim, Danielle Haim, Este Haim & Ariel Rechtshaid, songwriters; Emily Lazar, mastering engineer
2022	We Are	Jon Batiste	Craig Adams, David Gauthier, Braedon Gautier, Brennon Gautier, Gospel Soul Children Choir, Hot 8 Brass Band, PJ Morton, Autumn Rowe, Zadie Smith, St. Augustine High School Marching 100 & Trombone Shorty, featured artists; Jon Batiste, Mikey Freedom Hart, King Garbage, Kizzo, Sunny Levine, Nate Mercereau, David Pimentel, Ricky Reed, Autumn Rowe, Jahaan Sweet & Nick Waterhouse, producers; Batiste, Russ Elevado, Mischa Kachkachishvili, Kizzo, Joseph Lorge, Manny Marroquin, Pimentel, Reed, Jaclyn Sanchez, Matt Vertere, Ken Oriole, Marc Whitmore & Alex Williams, engineers/mixers; Andrae Alexander, Troy Andrews, Batiste, Zach Cooper, Vic Dimotsis, Eric Frederic, Kizzo, Levine, Steve McEwan, Morton, Rowe & Mavis Staples, songwriters; Emerson Mancini, mastering engineer
2022	Back of My Mind	H.E.R.	Chris Brown, Cordae, DJ Khaled, Lil Baby, Thundercat, Bryson Tiller, Ty Dolla Sign, YG & Yung Bleu, featured artists; Tarik Azzouz, Bordeaux, Nelson Bridges, DJ Camper, Cardiak, Cardo, Chi Chi, Steven J. Collins, Ronald "Flip" Colson, Jeff "Gitty" Gitelman, Grades, H.E.R., Hit-Boy, Rodney "Darkchild" Jerkins, Walter Jones, Kaytranada, DJ Khaled, Mario Luciano, Mike Will Made-It, NonNative, Nova Wav, Scribz Riley, Jeff Robinson, Streetrunner, Hue Strother, Asa Taccone, Thundercat, Thurdi & Wu10, producers; Rafael Fai Bautista, Luis Bordeaux, Dee Brown, Anthony Cruz, Ayanna Depas, Morning Estrada, Chris Galland, H.E.R., Jaycen Joshua, Kaytranada, Derek Keota, Omar Loya, Manny Marroquin, Tim McClain, Juan "AyoJuan" Peña, Micah Petit, Patrizio Pigliapoco, Alex Pyle, Jaclyn Sanchez, Miki Tsutsumi & Tito "Earcandy" Vasquez, engineers/mixers; Denisia "Blu June" Andrews, Nasri Atweh, Tarik Azzouz, Stacy Barthe, Jeremy Biddle, Nelson "Keyz" Bridges, Chris Brown, Stephen Bruner, Darhyl Camper Jr., Luis Campozano, Louis Kevin Celestin, Anthony Clemons Jr., Steven J. Collins, Ronald "Flip" Colson, Brittany "Chi" Coney, Elijah Dias, Cordae Dunston, Jeff Gitelman, Tyrone Griffin Jr., Priscilla "Priscilla Renea" Hamilton, H.E.R., Charles A. Hinshaw, Chauncey Hollis, Latisha Twana Hyman, Keenon Daequan Ray Jackson, Rodney Jerkins, Dominique Jones, Khaled Khaled, Ron Latour, Gamal "Lunchmoney" Lewis, Mario Luciano, Carl McCormick, Leon McQuay III, Julia Michaels, Maxx Moore, Vurdell "V. Script" Muller, Chidi Osondu, Karriem Riggins, Mike "Scribz" Riley, Seandrea Sledge, Hue Strother, Asa Taccone, Tiara Thomas, Bryson Tiller, Daniel James Traynor, Brendan Walsh, Nicholas Warwar, Jabrile Hashim Williams, Michael L. Williams II, Robert Williams & Kelvin Wooten, songwriters; Dave Kutch & Colin Leonard, mastering engineers
2022	Donda	Kanye West	Baby Keem, Chris Brown, Conway the Machine, DaBaby, Jay Electronica, Fivio Foreign, Westside Gunn, Jay-Z, Syleena Johnson, Kid Cudi, Lil Baby, Lil Durk, Lil Yachty, The LOX, Marilyn Manson, Playboi Carti, Pop Smoke, Roddy Ricch, Rooga, Travis Scott, Shenseea, Swizz Beatz, Young Thug, Don Toliver, Ty Dolla Sign, Vory & the Weeknd, featured artists; Allday, Audi, AyoAA, Roark Bailey, Louis Bell, Jeff Bhasker, Boi-1da, BoogzDaBeast, Warryn Campbell, Cubeatz, David & Eli, Mike Dean, Dem Jointz, Digital Nas, DJ Khalil, DrtWrk, 88-Keys, E*vax, FnZ, Gesaffelstein, Nikki Grier, Cory Henry, Ronny J, DJ Khalil, Wallis Lane, Digital Nas, Nascent, Ojivolta, Shuko, Sloane, Sean Solymar, Sucuki, Arron "Arrow" Sunday, Swizz Beatz, Zen Tachi, 30 Roc, Bastian Völkel, Mia Wallis, Kanye West, Wheezy & Jason White, producers; Josh Berg, Todd Bergman, Rashade Benani Bevel Sr., Will Chason, Dem Jointz, Irko, Jess Jackson, Nagaris Johnson, Shin Kamiyama, Gimel "Young Guru" Keaton, James Kelso, Scott McDowell, Kalam Ali Muttalib, Jonathan Pfarr, Jonathan Pfzar, Drrique Rendeer, Alejandro Rodriguez-Dawson, Mikalai Skrobat, Devon Wilson & Lorenzo Wolff, engineers/mixers; Dwayne Abernathy Jr., Elpadaro F. Electronica Allah, Aswad Asif, Roark Bailey, Durk Banks, Sam Barsh, Christoph Bauss, Louis Bell, Jeff Bhasker, Isaac De Boni, Christopher Brown, Jahshua Brown, Tahrence Brown, Aaron Butts, Warryn Campbell, Hykeem Carter Jr., Jordan Terrell Carter, Shawn Carter, Denzel Charles, Raul Cubina, Isaac De Boni, Kasseem Dean, Michael Dean, Tim Friedrich, Wesley Glass, Samuel Gloade, Kevin Gomringer, Tim Gomringer, Tyrone Griffin Jr., Jahmal Gwin, Cory Henry, Tavoris Javon Hollins Jr., Larry Hoover Jr., Bashar Jackson, Sean Jacob, Nima Jahanbin, Paimon Jahanbin, Syleena Johnson, Dominique Armani Jones, Eli Klughammer, Chinsea Lee, Mike Lévy, Evan Mast, Mark Mbogo, Miles McCollum, Josh Mease, Scott Medcudi, Brian Miller, Rodrick Wayne Moore Jr., Michael Mulé, Mark Myrie, Charles M. Njapa, Nasir Pemberton, Carlos "Saint Jhn" Phillips, Jason Phillips, Khalil Abdul Rahman, Laraya Ashlee Robinson, Christopher Ruelas, David Ruoff, Maxie Lee Ryles III, Matthew Samuels, Daniel Seeff, Eric Sloan Jr., Sean Solymar, Ronald O’Neill Spence Jr., David Styles, Michael Suski, Aqeel Tate, Abel Makkonen Tesfaye, Caleb Zackery Toliver, Bastian Völkel, Brian Hugh Warner, Jacques Webster II, Kanye West, Orlando Wilder, Jeffery Williams & Mark Williams, songwriters; Irko, mastering engineer
2022	Evermore	Taylor Swift	Bon Iver, Haim & The National, featured artists; Jack Antonoff, Aaron Dessner, Bryce Dessner & Taylor Swift, producers; Thomas Bartlett, JT Bates, Robin Baynton, Stuart Bogie, Gabriel Cabezas, CJ Camerieri, Aaron Dessner, Bryce Dessner, Scott Devendorf, Matt DiMona, Jon Gautier, Trevor Hagen, Mikey Freedom Hart, Sean Hutchinson, Josh Kaufman, Benjamin Lanz, Nick Lloyd, Jonathan Low, James McAlister, Dave Nelson, Sean O'Brien, Ryan Olson, Ariel Rechtshaid, Kyle Resnick, Laura Sisk, Evan Smith, Alex Sopp & Justin Vernon, engineers/mixers; Jack Antonoff, William Bowery, Aaron Dessner, Bryce Dessner, Taylor Swift & Justin Vernon, songwriters; Greg Calbi & Steve Fallone, mastering engineers
2022	Happier Than Ever	Billie Eilish	Finneas, producer; Billie Eilish, Finneas & Rob Kinelski, engineers/mixers; Eilish & Finneas, songwriters; John Greenham & Dave Kutch, mastering engineers
2022	Justice (Triple Chucks Deluxe)	Justin Bieber	Beam, Benny Blanco, Burna Boy, Daniel Caesar, Chance The Rapper, DaBaby, Dominic Fike, Giveon, Jaden, Tori Kelly, Khalid, The Kid Laroi, Lil Uzi Vert & Quavo, featured artists; Amy Allen, Louis Bell, Jon Bellion, Bieber, Blanco, BMW Kenny, Capi, Dreamlab, DVLP, Jason Evigan, Finneas, The Futuristics, German, Josh Gudwin, Jimmie Gutch, Harv, Marvin "Tony" Hemmings, Ilya, Rodney "Darkchild" Jerkins, Stefan Johnson, KCdaproducer, Denis Kosiak, The Monsters & Strangerz, Jorgen Odegard, Michael Pollack, Poo Bear, Shndo, Skrillex, Jake Torrey, Trackz, Andrew Watt & Ido Zmishlany, producers; Cory Bice, Blanco, Kevin "Capi" Carbo, Edwin Diaz, DJ Durel, Dreamlab, Finneas, Josh Gudwin, Sam Holland, Daniel James, Antonio Kearney, Denis Kosiak, Paul LaMalfa, Jeremy Lertola, Devin Nakao, Chris "Tek" O'Ryan, Andres Osorio, Micah Pettit & Benjamin Thomas, engineers/mixers; Allen, Delacey (Brittany Amaradio), Bell, Jonathan Bellion, Chancelor Johnathon Bennett, Bieber, David Bowden, Jason Boyd, Scott Braun, Tommy Lee Brown, Valentin Brunn, Kevin Carbo, Kenneth Coby, Kevin Coby, Raul Cubina, Jordan Douglas, Giveon Dezmann Evans, Jason Evigan, Dominic David Fike, Kameron Glasper, Jacob Greenspan, Josh Gudwin, James Gutch, Scott Harris, Bernard Harvey, Leah Haywood, Gregory Aldae Hein, Marvin Hemmings, Jeffrey Howard, Alexander Izquierdo, Daniel James, Jace Logan Jennings, Rodney Jerkins, Jordan K. Johnson, Stefan Johnson, Anthony M. Jones, Antonio Kearney, Charlton Kenneth, Joe Khajadourian, Felisha "Fury" King, Jonathan Lyndale Kirk, Matthew Sean Leon, Benjamin Levin, Marcus Lomax, Quavious Keyate Marshall, Luis Manuel Martinez Jr., Sonny Moore, Finneas O’Connell, Jorgen Odegard, Damini Ebunoluwa Ogulu, Tayla Parx, Oliver Peterhof, Whitney Phillips, Michael Pollack, Khalid Donnel Robinson, Ilya Salmanzadeh, Alex Schwartz, Tia Scola, Aaron Simmonds, Ashton Simmonds, Gian Stone, Ali Tamposi, Ryan Tedder, Tyshane Thompson, Jake Torrey, Billy Walsh, Freddy Wexler, Symere Woods, Andrew Wotman, Rami Yacoub, Keavan Yazdani, Bigram Zayas & Ido Zmishlany, songwriters; Colin Leonard, mastering engineer
2022	Love for Sale	Tony Bennett & Lady Gaga	Dae Bennett, producer; Bennett, Josh Coleman & Billy Cumella, engineers/mixers; Greg Calbi & Steve Fallone, mastering engineers
2022	Montero	Lil Nas X	Miley Cyrus, Doja Cat, Jack Harlow, Elton John & Megan Thee Stallion, featured artists; Take a Daytrip, John Cunningham, Omer Fedi, Kuk Harrell, Jasper Harris, KBeaZy, Carter Lang, Nick Lee, Roy Lenzo, Tom Levesque, Jasper Sheff, Blake Slatkin, Drew Sliger, Take A Daytrip, Ryan Tedder & Kanye West, producers; Denzel Baptiste, David Biral, Jon Castelli, John Cunningham, Jelli Dorman, Tom Elmhirst, Şerban Ghenea, Kuk Harrell, Roy Lenzo, Manny Marroquin, Nickie Jon Pabon, Patrizio 'Teezio' Pigliapoco, Blake Slatkin, Drew Sliger, Ryan Tedder & Joe Visciano, engineers/mixers; Keegan Bach, Denzel Baptiste, David Biral, John Cunningham, Miley Cyrus, Amala Zandile Dlamini, Omer Fedi, Vincent Goodyer, Jack Harlow, Jasper Harris, Montero Hill, Isley Juber, Carter Lang, Nick Lee, Roy Lenzo, Thomas James Levesque, Andrew Luce, Michael Olmo, Jasper Sheff, Blake Slatkin, Ryan Tedder, William K. Ward & Kanye West, songwriters; Chris Gehringer, Eric Lagg & Randy Merrill, mastering engineers
2022	Planet Her (Deluxe)	Doja Cat	Eve, Ariana Grande, Gunna, JID, SZA, The Weeknd & Young Thug, featured artists; Aaron Bow, Rogét Chahayed, Crate Classics, Digi, Dr. Luke, Fallen, Mayer Hawthorne, Mike Hector, Linden Jay, Aynzli Jones, Kurtis McKenzie, Jason Quenneville, Reef, Khaled Rohaim, Al Shux, Sully, tizhimself, Yeti Beats & Y2K, producers; Rob Bisel, Jesse Ray Ernster, Şerban Ghenea, Clint Gibbs, Rian Lewis, NealHPogue, Tyler Sheppard, Kalani Thompson, Joe Visciano & Jeff Ellis Worldwide, engineers/mixers; Ilana Armida, Aaron Bow, Rogét Chahayed, Jamil Chammas, Sheldon Yu-Ting Cheung, Antwoine Collins, Amala Zandile Dlamini, Lukasz Gottwald, Ariana Grande, Mayer Hawthorne, Mike Hector, Aaron Horn, Taneisha Damielle Jackson, Linden Jay, Eve Jihan Jeffers, Aynzli Jones, Sergio Kitchens, Carter Lang, Siddharth Mallick, Maciej Margol-Gromada, Kurtis McKenzie, Jidenna Mobisson, Gerard A. Powell II, Geordan Reid-Campbell, Khaled Rohaim, Destin Route, Solána Rowe, Laura Roy, Al Shuckburgh, David Sprecher, Ari Starace, Lee Stashenko, Abel Tesfaye, Rob Tewlow & Jeffery Lamar Williams, songwriters; Dale Becker & Mike Bozzi, mastering engineers
2022	Sour	Olivia Rodrigo	Alexander 23, Daniel Nigro & Olivia Rodrigo, producers; Ryan Linvill, Mitch McCarthy & Daniel Nigro, engineers/mixers; Daniel Nigro, Olivia Rodrigo & Casey Smith, songwriters; Randy Merrill, mastering engineer
2023	Harry's House	Harry Styles	Tyler Johnson, Kid Harpoon & Sammy Witte, producers; Jeremy Hatcher, Oli Jacobs, Nick Lobel, Spike Stent & Sammy Witte, engineers/mixers; Amy Allen, Tobias Jesso Jr., Tyler Johnson, Kid Harpoon, Mitch Rowland, Harry Styles & Sammy Witte, songwriters; Randy Merrill, mastering engineer
2023	30	Adele	Shawn Everett, Ludwig Göransson, Inflo, Tobias Jesso, Jr., Greg Kurstin, Max Martin, Joey Pecoraro & Shellback, producers; Julian Burg, Steve Churchyard, Tom Elmhirst, Shawn Everett, Şerban Ghenea, John Hanes, Sam Holland, Michael Ilbert, Inflo, Greg Kurstin, Riley Mackin & Lasse Mårtén, engineers/mixers; Adele Adkins, Ludwig Göransson, Dean Josiah Cover, Tobias Jesso, Jr., Greg Kurstin, Max Martin & Shellback, songwriters; Randy Merrill, mastering engineer
2023	Good Morning Gorgeous (Deluxe)	Mary J. Blige	DJ Khaled, Dave East, Fabolous, Fivio Foreign, Griselda, H.E.R., Jadakiss, Moneybagg Yo, Ne-Yo, Anderson .Paak, Remy Ma & Usher, featured artists; Alissia, Tarik Azzouz, Bengineer, Blacka Din Me, Rogét Chahayed, Cool & Dre, Ben Billions, DJ Cassidy, DJ Khaled, D'Mile, Wonda, BongoBytheway, H.E.R., Hostile Beats, Eric Hudson, London on da Track, Leon Michels, Nova Wav, Anderson.Paak, Sl!Mwav, Streetrunner, Swizz Beatz & J. White Did It, producers; Derek Ali, Ben Chang, Luis Bordeaux, Bryce Bordone, Lauren D'Elia, Chris Galland, Şerban Ghenea, Akeel Henry, Jaycen Joshua, Pat Kelly, Jhair Lazo, Shamele Mackie, Manny Marroquin, Dave Medrano, Ari Morris, Parks, Juan Peña, Ben Sedano, Kev Spencer, Julio Ulloa & Jodie Grayson Williams, engineers/mixers; Alissia Beneviste, Denisia "Blu June" Andrews, Archer, Bianca Atterberry, Tarik Azzouz, Mary J. Blige, David Brewster, David Brown, Shawn Butler, Rogét Chahayed, Ant Clemons, Brittany "Chi" Coney, Kasseem Dean, Benjamin Diehl, DJ Cassidy, Jocelyn Donald, Jerry Duplessis, Uforo Ebong, Dernst Emile II, John Jackson, Gabriella Wilson, Shawn Hibbler, Charles A. Hinshaw, Jamie Hurton, Eric Hudson, Jason Phillips, Khaled Khaled, London Holmes, Andre "Dre" Christopher Lyon, Reminisce Mackie, Leon Michels, Jerome Monroe, Jr., Kim Owens, Brandon Anderson, Jeremie "Benny The Butcher" Pennick, Demond "Conway The Machine" Price, Peter Skellern, Shaffer Smith, Nicholas Warwar, Deforrest Taylor, Tiara Thomas, Marcello "Cool" Valenzano, Alvin "Westside Gunn" Worthy, Anthony Jermaine White & Leon Youngblood, songwriters
2023	In These Silent Days	Brandi Carlile	Lucius, featured artist; Dave Cobb & Shooter Jennings, producers; Brandon Bell, Dave Cobb, Tom Elmhirst, Michael Harris & Shooter Jennings, engineers/mixers; Brandi Carlile, Dave Cobb, Phil Hanseroth & Tim Hanseroth, songwriters; Pete Lyman, mastering engineer
2023	Mr. Morale & the Big Steppers	Kendrick Lamar	Baby Keem, Blxst, Sam Dew, Ghostface Killah, Beth Gibbons, Kodak Black, Tanna Leone, Taylour Paige, Amanda Reifer, Sampha & Summer Walker, featured artists; The Alchemist, Baby Keem, Craig Balmoris, Beach Noise, Bekon, Boi-1da, Cardo, Dahi, DJ Khalil, FnZ, Frano, Sergiu Gherman, Emile Haynie, Johnny Juliano, J.LBS, Mario Luciano, OKLAMA, Timothy Maxie, Rascal, Sounwave, Jahaan Sweet, Tae Beast, Duval Timothy & Pharrell Williams, producers; Derek Ali, Matt Anthony, Beach Noise, Rob Bisel, David Bishop, Troy Bourgeois, Andrew Boyd, Ray Charles Brown Jr., Derek Garcia, Chad Gordon, James Hunt, Johnny Kosich, Mike Larson, Manny Marroquin, Erwing Olivares, Tyler Reese, Raymond J Scavo III, Matt Schaeffer, Cyrus Taghipour, Johnathan Turner & Joe Visciano, engineers/mixers; Khalil Abdul-Rahman, Hykeem Carter, Craig Balmoris, Beach Noise, Daniel Tannenbaum, Daniel Tannenbaum, Stephen Lee Bruner, Matthew Burdette, Isaac John De Boni, Sam Dew, Anthony Dixson, Victor Ekpo, Sergiu Gherman, Dennis Coles, Beth Gibbons, Frano Huett, Stuart Johnson, John Julian, Bill K. Kapri, Jake Kosich, Johnny Kosich, Daniel Krieger, Kendrick Lamar, Ronald LaTour, Mario Luciano, Daniel Alan Maman, Timothy Maxie, Danny McKinney, Michael John Mulé, D. Natche, OKLAMA, Jason Pounds, Rascal, Tyler Reese, Amanda Reifer, Ely Rise, Matthew Samuels, Avante Santana, Matt Schaeffer, Sampha Sisay, Mark Spears, Homer Steinweiss, Jahaan Akil Sweet, Donte Lamar Perkins, Duval Timothy, Summer Walker & Pharrell Williams, songwriters; Emerson Mancini, mastering engineer
2023	Music of the Spheres	Coldplay	BTS, Jacob Collier, Selena Gomez & We Are KING, featured artists; Jacob Collier, Daniel Green, Oscar Holter, Jon Hopkins, Max Martin, Metro Boomin, Kang Hyo-Won, Bill Rahko, Bart Schoudel, Rik Simpson, Paris Strother & We Are KING, producers; Guy Berryman, Jonny Buckland, Will Champion, Jacob Collier, The Dream Team, Duncan Fuller, Şerban Ghenea, Daniel Green, John Hanes, Jon Hopkins, Michael Ilbert, Max Martin, Bill Rahko, Bart Schoudel, Rik Simpson & Paris Strother, engineers/mixers; Guy Berryman, Jonny Buckland, Denise Carite, Will Champion, Jacob Collier, Derek Dixie, Sam Falson, Stephen Fry, Daniel Green, Oscar Holter, Jon Hopkins, Jung Ho-Seok, Chris Martin, Max Martin, John Metcalfe, Leland Tyler Wayne, Bill Rahko, Kim Nam-Joon, Jesse Rogg, Davide Rossi, Rik Simpson, Amber Strother, Paris Strother, Min Yoon-Gi, Federico Vindver & Olivia Waithe, songwriters; Randy Merrill, mastering engineer
2023	Renaissance	Beyoncé	Beam, Grace Jones & Tems, featured artists; Jameil Aossey, Bah, Beam, Beyoncé, BloodPop, Boi-1da, Cadenza, Al Cres, Mike Dean, Honey Dijon, Kelman Duran, Harry Edwards, Terius "The-Dream" Gesteelde-Diamant, Ivor Guest, GuiltyBeatz, Hit-Boy, Jens Christian Isaksen, Leven Kali, Lil Ju, MeLo-X, No I.D., Nova Wav, Chris Penny, P2J, Rissi, S1a0, Raphael Saadiq, Neenyo, Skrillex, Luke Solomon, Christopher "Tricky" Stewart, Jahaan Sweet, Syd, Sevn Thomas, Sol Was & Stuart White, producers; Chi Coney, Russell Graham, Guiltybeatz, Brandon Harding, Hotae Alexander Jang, Matheus Braz, Chris McLaughlin, Delroy "Phatta" Pottinger, Andrea Roberts, Steve Rusch, Jabbar Stevens & Stuart White, engineers/mixers; Denisia "@Blu June" Andrews, Danielle Balbuena, Tyshane Thompson, Kevin Marquis Bellmon, Sydney Bennett, Beyoncé, Michael Tucker, Atia Boggs p/k/a Ink, Dustin Bowie, David Debrandon Brown, S. Carter, Nija Charles, Sabrina Claudio, Solomon Fagenson Cole, Brittany "@Chi_Coney" Coney, Alexander Guy Cook, Levar Coppin, Almando Cresso, Mike Dean, Saliou Diagne, Darius Dixson, Jocelyn Donald, Jordan Douglas, Aubrey Drake Graham, Kelman Duran, Terius "The-Dream" Gesteelde-Diamant, Dave Giles II, Derrick Carrington Gray, Nick Green, Larry Griffin Jr, Ronald Banful, Dave Hamelin, Aviel Calev Hirschfield, Chauncey Hollis, Jr., Ariowa Irosogie, Leven Kali, Ricky Lawson, Tizita Makuria, Julian Martrel Mason, Daniel Memmi, Cherdericka Nichols, Ernest "No I.D." Wilson, Temilade Openiyi, Patrick Paige II, Christopher Lawrence Penny, Michael Pollack, Richard Isong, Honey Redmond, Derek Renfroe, Morten Ristorp, Nile Rodgers, Oliver Rodigan, Raphael Saadiq, Matthew Samuels, Sean Seaton, Skrillex, Corece Smith, Luke Francis Matthew Solomon, Jabbar Stevens, Christopher A. Stewart, Jahaan Sweet, Rupert Thomas, Jr. & Jesse Wilson, songwriters; Colin Leonard, mastering engineer
2023	Special	Lizzo	Benny Blanco, Quelle Chris, Daoud, Omer Fedi, ILYA, Kid Harpoon, Ian Kirkpatrick, Max Martin, Nate Mercereau, The Monsters & Strangerz, Phoelix, Ricky Reed, Mark Ronson, Blake Slatkin & Pop Wansel, producers; Benny Blanco, Bryce Bordone, Jeff Chestek, Jacob Ferguson, Şerban Ghenea, Jeremy Hatcher, Andrew Hey, Sam Holland, ILYA, Stefan Johnson, Jens Jungkurth, Patrick Kehrier, Ian Kirkpatrick, Damien Lewis, Bill Malina, Manny Marroquin & Ricky Reed, engineers/mixers; Amy Allen, Daoud Anthony, Jonathan Bellion, Benjamin Levin, Thomas Brenneck, Christian Devivo, Omer Fedi, Eric Frederic, Ilya Salmanzadeh, Melissa Jefferson, Jordan K Johnson, Stefan Johnson, Kid Harpoon, Ian Kirkpatrick, Savan Kotecha, Max Martin, Nate Mercereau, Leon Michels, Nick Movshon, Michael Neil, Michael Pollack, Mark Ronson, Blake Slatkin, Peter Svensson, Gavin Chris Tennille, Theron Makiel Thomas, Andrew Wansel & Emily Warren, songwriters; Emerson Mancini, mastering engineer
2023	Un Verano Sin Ti	Bad Bunny	Rauw Alejandro, Buscabulla, Chencho Corleone, Jhay Cortez, Tony Dize, Bomba Estéreo & The Marías, featured artists; BYRD, De La Cruz, Demy & Clipz, Elikai, Hassi, HAZE, Albert Hype, La Paciencia, Cheo Legendary, Richie Lopez, MAG, MagicEnElBeat, Masis, MICK, Jesus Alberto Molina, Mora, Jota Rosa, SCOTT, Subelo Neo, Tainy & ZULIA, producers; Josh Gudwin & Roberto Rosado, engineers/mixers; Raul Alejandro Ocasio Ruiz, Kamil Assad, Benito Antonio Martinez Ocasio, Julian Quiles Betancourt, Leutrim Bequiri, Raquel Berrios, Abner Jose Cordero Boria, Marco Daniel Borrero, Joaquin Calderon Bravo, Harry Alexis Ramos Cabrera, Joshua Conway, Martin Coogan, Kaled Elikai Cordova, Orlando Javier Valle Vega, Jesus Nieves Cortes, Jose Cruz, Misael De La Cruz, Luis Del Valle, Scott Dittrich, Etienne Gagnon, Jason Garcia, Juan Diego Linares Gonzalez, Nicolas Jara, Ritchie Lopez, Steve Martinez-Funes, Marcos Masis, Michael Masis, Adrian McKinnon, Alberto Carlos Melendez, Jesus Alberto Molina, Freddy Montalvo, Gabriel Mora, Hector Pagan, Darwin Cordale Quinn, Tony Felician Rivera, Jose Raphael Arce Rodriguez, Joel Hernandez Rodriguez, Egbert Rosa, Roberto Rosado, Joselly Rosario, Elena Rose, Liliana Margarita Saumet & Maria Zardoya, songwriters; Colin Leonard, mastering engineer
2023	Voyage	ABBA	Benny Andersson, producer; Benny Andersson & Bernard Löhr, engineers/mixers; Benny Andersson & Björn Ulvaeus, songwriters; Björn Engelmann, mastering engineer
2024	Midnights	Taylor Swift	Jack Antonoff & Taylor Swift, producers; Jack Antonoff, Zem Audu, Serban Ghenea, David Hart, Mikey Freedom Hart, Sean Hutchinson, Ken Lewis, Michael Riddleberger, Laura Sisk & Evan Smith, engineers/mixers; Jack Antonoff & Taylor Swift, songwriters; Randy Merrill, mastering engineer
2024	The Age of Pleasure	Janelle Monáe	Sensei Bueno, Nate "Rocket" Wonder & Nana Kwabena, producers; Mick Guzauski, Nate "Rocket" Wonder, Jayda Love, Janelle Monáe & Yáng Tan, engineers/mixers; Jarrett Goodly, Nathaniel Irvin III, Janelle Monáe Robinson & Nana Kwabena Tuffuor, songwriters; Dave Kutch, mastering engineer
2024	Did You Know That There's a Tunnel Under Ocean Blvd	Lana Del Rey	Jack Antonoff, Zach Dawes, Lana Del Rey & Drew Erickson, producers; Jack Antonoff, Michael Harris, Dean Reid & Laura Sisk, engineers/mixers; Jack Antonoff, Lana Del Rey & Mike Hermosa, songwriters; Ruairi O'Flaherty, mastering engineer
2024	Endless Summer Vacation	Miley Cyrus	Kid Harpoon, Tyler Johnson & Mike Will Made-It, producers; Pièce Eatah, Craig Frank, Paul David Hager, Stacy Jones, Brian Rajaratnam & Mark "Spike" Stent, engineers/mixers; Miley Cyrus, Gregory Aldae Hein, Thomas Hull, Tyler Johnson, Michael Len Williams II & Michael Pollack, songwriters; Joe LaPorta, mastering engineer
2024	Guts	Olivia Rodrigo	Dan Nigro, producer; Serban Ghenea, Sterling Laws, Mitch McCarthy, Dan Nigro, Dave Schiffman, Mark "Spike" Stent, Sam Stewart & Dan Viafore, engineers/mixers; Dan Nigro & Olivia Rodrigo, songwriters; Randy Merrill, mastering engineer
2024	The Record	Boygenius	boygenius & Catherine Marks, producers; Owen Lantz, Will Maclellan, Catherine Marks, Mike Mogis, Bobby Mota, Kaushlesh "Garry" Purohit & Sarah Tudzin, engineers/mixers; Julien Baker, Phoebe Bridgers & Lucy Dacus, songwriters; Pat Sullivan, mastering engineer
2024	SOS	SZA	Rob Bisel, ThankGod4Cody & Carter Lang, producers; Rob Bisel, engineer/mixer; Rob Bisel, Cody Fayne, Carter Lang & Solána Rowe, songwriters; Dale Becker, mastering engineer
2024	World Music Radio	Jon Batiste	Jon Batiste, Jon Bellion, Nick Cooper, Pete Nappi & Tenroc, producers; Jon Batiste, Pete Nappi, Kaleb Rollins, Laura Sisk & Marc Whitmore, engineers/mixers; Jon Batiste, Jon Bellion, Jason Cornet & Pete Nappi, songwriters; Chris Gehringer, mastering engineer
2025	Cowboy Carter	Beyoncé	Beyoncé, Terius “The-Dream” Gesteelde-Diamant & Dave Hamelin, producers; Matheus Braz, Brandon Harding, Hotae Alexander Jang, Dani Pampuri & Stuart White, engineers/mixers; Ryan Beatty, Beyoncé, Camaron Ochs, Terius “The-Dream” Gesteelde-Diamant, Dave Hamelin, Shawn Carter & Raphael Saadiq, songwriters; Colin Leonard, mastering engineer'
2025	Brat	Charli XCX	Charli XCX, Cirkut & A. G. Cook, producers; A. G. Cook, Tom Norris & Geoff Swan, engineers/mixers; Charlotte Aitchison, Henry Walter, Alexander Guy Cook, Finn Keane & Jonathan Christopher Shave, songwriters; Idania Valencia, mastering engineer
2025	Djesse Vol. 4	Jacob Collier	Jacob Collier, producer; Ben Bloomberg, Jacob Collier & Paul Pouwer, engineers/mixers; Jacob Collier, songwriter; Chris Allgood & Emily Lazar, mastering engineers
2025	Hit Me Hard and Soft	Billie Eilish	Billie Eilish & Finneas, producers; Thom Beemer, Jon Castelli, Billie Eilish, Finneas, Aron Forbes, Brad Lauchert & Chaz Sexton, engineers/mixers; Billie Eilish O’Connell & Finneas O'Connell, songwriters; Dale Becker, mastering engineer
2025	New Blue Sun	André 3000	André 3000 & Carlos Niño, producers; André 3000, Carlos Niño & Ken Oriole, engineers/mixers; André 3000, Surya Botofasina, Nate Mercereau & Carlos Niño, songwriters; Andy Kravitz, mastering engineer
2025	The Rise and Fall of a Midwest Princess	Chappell Roan	Daniel Nigro, producer; Mitch McCarthy & Daniel Nigro, engineers/mixers; Daniel Nigro & Kayleigh Rose Amstutz, songwriters; Randy Merrill, mastering engineer
2025	Short n' Sweet	Sabrina Carpenter	Jack Antonoff, Julian Bunetta, Ian Kirkpatrick & John Ryan, producers; Bryce Bordone, Julian Bunetta, Serban Ghenea, Jeff Gunnell, Oli Jacobs, Manny Marroquin, John Ryan & Laura Sisk, engineers/mixers; Amy Allen, Jack Antonoff, Julian Bunetta, Sabrina Carpenter, Ian Kirkpatrick, Julia Michaels & John Ryan, songwriters; Nathan Dantzler & Ruairi O’Flaherty, mastering engineers
2025	The Tortured Poets Department	Taylor Swift	Jack Antonoff, Aaron Dessner & Taylor Swift, producers; Zem Audu, Bella Blasko, Bryce Bordone, Serban Ghenea, David Hart, Mikey Freedom Hart, Sean Hutchinson, Oli Jacobs, Jonathan Low, Michael Riddleberger, Christopher Rowe, Laura Sisk & Evan Smith, engineers/mixers; Jack Antonoff, Aaron Dessner & Taylor Swift, songwriters; Randy Merrill, mastering engineer
2026	Debí Tirar Más Fotos	Bad Bunny	Big Jay, La Paciencia, Mag & Tainy, producers; Antonio Caraballo, Josh Gudwin, Luis Amed Irizarry & Roberto José Rosado Torres, engineers/mixers; Benito Antonio Martínez Ocasio, Roberto José Rosado Torres, Marco Daniel Borrero, Jay Anthony Nuñez & Marcos Efrain Masis, songwriters; Colin Leonard, mastering engineer
2026	Chromakopia	Tyler, the Creator	Tyler, the Creator, producer; Neal H Pogue, Tyler Okonma & Vic Wainstein, engineers/mixers; Tyler Okonma, songwriter; Mike Bozzi, mastering engineer
2026	GNX	Kendrick Lamar	Jack Antonoff & Sounwave, producers; Jack Antonoff, Ray Charles Brown Jr., Jozef Caldwell, Oli Jacobs, Jack Manning, Dani Perez, Laura Sisk & Johnathan Turner, engineers/mixers; Jack Antonoff, Ink, Scott Bridgeway, Sam Dew, Kendrick Lamar, Matthew Bernard & Mark Anthony Spears, songwriters; Ruairi O'Flaherty, mastering engineer
2026	Let God Sort Em Out	Clipse	Pharrell Williams, producer; Mike Larson, Manny Marroquin, Rob Ulsh & Pharrell Williams, engineers/mixers; Gene Elliott Thornton Jr., Terrence Thornton & Pharrell Williams, songwriters; Zach Pereyra, mastering engineer
2026	Man's Best Friend	Sabrina Carpenter	Jack Antonoff, Sabrina Carpenter & John Ryan, producers; Zem Audu, Jack Antonoff, Bryce Bordone, Jozef Caldwell, Serban Ghenea, Jeff Gunnell, David Hart, Mikey Freedom Hart, Sean Hutchinson, Oli Jacobs, Jack Manning, Joey Miller, Michael Riddleberger, John Ryan, Laura Sisk & Evan Smith, engineers/mixers; Amy Allen, Jack Antonoff, Sabrina Carpenter & John Ryan, songwriters; Nathan Dantzler & Ruairi O'Flaherty, mastering engineers
2026	Mayhem	Lady Gaga	Cirkut, Lady Gaga, Gesaffelstein & Andrew Watt, producers; Bryce Bordone, Serban Ghenea & Paul LaMalfa, engineers/mixers; Henry Walter, Lady Gaga, Mike Lévy, Michael Polansky & Andrew Watt, songwriters; Randy Merrill, mastering engineer
2026	Mutt	Leon Thomas	Freaky Rob, Peter Lee Johnson, D. Phelps & Leon Thomas, producers; Jean-Marie Horvat, engineer/mixer; Lazaro Andres Camejo, Freaky Rob, Peter Lee Johnson, D. Phelps & Leon Thomas, songwriters; Dave Kutch, mastering engineer
2026	Swag	Justin Bieber	Eddie Benjamin, Justin Bieber, Daniel Chetrit, Dijon, Carter Lang & Dylan Wiggins, producers; Felix Byrne & Josh Gudwin, engineers/mixers; Eddie Benjamin, Justin Bieber, Daniel Chetrit, Dijon Duenas, Tobias Jesso Jr., Carter Lang, Jackson Lee Morgan & Dylan Wiggins, songwriters; Dale Becker, mastering engineer
2027	The Art of Loving	Olivia Dean	Bastian Langebæk, Zach Nahome & Max Wolfgang, producers; Charlie Holmes & Zach Nahome, engineers/mixers; Olivia Dean, Bastian Langebæk, Max Wolfgang, songwriters; Simon Francis, mastering engineer
2027	Dandelion	Ella Langley	Ella Langley, Miranda Lambert & Ben West, producers; Devin Dawson, Dave Clauss & Ben West, engineers/mixers; Ella Langley, songwriter; Andrew Mendelson, mastering engineer
2027	The Life of a Showgirl	Taylor Swift	Max Martin, Shellback & Taylor Swift, producers; Bryce Bordone, Lasse Mårtén, Mattias Bylund, Serban Ghenea, Shellback & Max Martin, engineers/mixers; Max Martin, Shellback & Taylor Swift, songwriters; Randy Merrill, mastering engineer
2027	Lost Weekend	Phoebe Bridgers	Phoebe Bridgers, Ethan Gruska, Jack Antonoff, Tony Berg, Alexander Giannascoli, producers; Jack Antonoff, Sam Gazarian, Cam Gilfoy, Oli Jacobs, Will Maclellan, Jack Manning, Kellie McGrew, Joey Miller, Laura Sisk, Gregg White, engineers/mixers; Phoebe Bridgers, Christian Lee Hutson, Marshall Vore, songwriters; Ruairí O'Flaherty, mastering engineer
2027	Lux (Complete Works)	Rosalía	Rosalía, Noah Goldstein, Dylan Wiggins, producers; Antonio Caraballo, Josh Gudwin, Luis Amed Irizarry & Roberto José Rosado Torres, engineers/mixers; Rosalía Vila Tobella, songwriter; Bob Jackson & Brian Lee, mastering engineer
2027	The Romantic	Bruno Mars	Bruno Mars and D'Mile, producers; Bryce Bordone, Serban Ghenea, Charles Moniz, engineers/mixers; Bruno Mars, D'Mile, Philip Lawrence, songwriters; Randy Merrill, mastering engineer
2027	This Music May Contain Hope	Raye	Chris Hill, Raye, Tom Richards, & Mike Sabath producers; Alex Robinson, Andrew Dudman, Chris Parker & Tony Maserati, engineers/mixers; Raye, songwriter; Mike Hillier, mastering engineer
2027	You Seem Pretty Sad for a Girl So in Love	Olivia Rodrigo	Dan Nigro, producer; Chris Kasych & Mitch McCarthy, engineers/mixers; Amy Allen, Dan Nigro & Olivia Rodrigo, songwriters; Randy Merrill, mastering engineer
