= A Man and His Music =

Studio album by Frank Sinatra
- Released: 1965
- Recorded: December 19, 1960 – October 21, 1965, Los Angeles and Hollywood
- Genre: Vocal jazz; traditional pop
- Length: 104:35
- Label: Reprise; 2FS 1016
- Producer: Sonny Burke

Frank Sinatra chronology
My Kind of Broadway (1965)	A Man and His Music (1965)	Moonlight Sinatra (1966)

Professional ratings
Review scores
Source	Rating
Allmusic	link
Encyclopedia of Popular Music	5/5 stars
Record Mirror	5/5 stars

A Man and His Music is a 1965 double album by Frank Sinatra. It provides a brief retrospective of Sinatra's musical career. The album won the 1967 Grammy Award for Album of the Year.

Instead of using the original recordings, which were made for RCA, Columbia and Capitol Records, and therefore not licensed for use by his then-current label, Reprise, Sinatra used re-recorded versions for the majority of the album's songs, culling tracks from his prior Reprise albums. Three songs were specifically recorded for the project: "I'll Never Smile Again", "Come Fly with Me" and "Love and Marriage". There is also a narration from Sinatra that runs throughout the album.

Approximately 2,000 copies of this album were originally released in a special wooden slipcase containing 3D artwork on the cover in the form of a metal plaque. Each copy was numbered and contained a signed card by Sinatra himself. The packaging also included a booklet highlighting Sinatra's career. A majority of these special "Man and His Music" LP's were given away as door prizes by Sinatra at a party in Palm Springs. The party celebrated the singer's 50th birthday, as well as the airing of Sinatra's 1965 NBC television special of the same name (Frank Sinatra: A Man and His Music).

== Track listing ==
=== Disc one ===
1. "Put Your Dreams Away (For Another Day)" (Ruth Lowe, Paul Mann, Stephan Weiss) – 3:10
2. "All or Nothing at All" (Arthur Altman, Jack Lawrence) – 4:26
3. "I'll Never Smile Again" (feat. Fred Waring and His Pennsylvanians) (Lowe) – 2:49
4. "There Are Such Things" (George W. Meyer, Stanley Adams, Abel Baer) – 2:57
5. "I'll Be Seeing You" (Sammy Fain, Irving Kahal) – 3:06
6. "The One I Love (Belongs to Somebody Else)" (Gus Kahn, Isham Jones) – 3:03
7. "Polka Dots and Moonbeams" (Johnny Burke, Jimmy Van Heusen) – 4:46
8. "Night and Day" (Cole Porter) – 4:29
9. "Oh! What It Seemed to Be" (Bennie Benjamin, George David Weiss, Frankie Carle) – 3:26
10. "Soliloquy" (from Carousel) (Richard Rodgers, Oscar Hammerstein II) – 8:19
11. "Nancy (With the Laughing Face)" (Phil Silvers, Van Heusen) – 4:21
12. "The House I Live In" (Lewis Allan, Earl Robinson) – 4:40
13. "From Here to Eternity" (Fred Karger, Robert Wells) – 2:44

=== Disc two ===
1. "Come Fly with Me" (Sammy Cahn, Van Heusen) – 2:13
2. "(How Little It Matters) How Little We Know" (Carolyn Leigh, Phil Springers) – 2:29
3. "Learnin' the Blues" (Dolores Vicki Silvers) – 2:31
4. "In the Wee Small Hours of the Morning" (David Mann, Bob Hilliard) – 2:43
5. "Young at Heart" (Leigh, Johnny Richards) – 3:51
6. "Witchcraft" (1965 re-recorded version) (Cy Coleman, Leigh) – 2:52
7. "All the Way" (Cahn, Van Heusen) – 3:27
8. "Love and Marriage" (1965 re-recorded version) (Cahn, Van Heusen) – 1:29
9. "I've Got You Under My Skin" (Porter) – 3:26
10. "Ring-a-Ding Ding" (Cahn, Van Heusen) – 1:07
11. "The Second Time Around" (Cahn, Van Heusen) – 2:13
12. "The Summit" (Frank Sinatra, Dean Martin, Sammy Davis Jr.) – 5:20
13. "The Oldest Established (Permanent Floating Crap Game in New York)" (with Martin and Bing Crosby) (Frank Loesser) – 2:31
14. "Luck Be a Lady" (Loesser) – 2:25
15. "Call Me Irresponsible" (Cahn, Van Heusen) – 2:45
16. "Fly Me to the Moon" (Bart Howard) – 2:30
17. "Softly, as I Leave You" (Hal Shaper, Tony De Vita, Giorgio Calabrese) – 2:57
18. "My Kind of Town" (1965 re-recorded version) (from Robin and the 7 Hoods) (Cahn, Van Heusen) – 2:30
19. "The September of My Years" (Cahn, Van Heusen) – 3:22

== Personnel ==
- Frank Sinatra – vocals
- Count Basie and his orchestra
- Fred Waring and his Pennsylvanians – backing choir
- Don Costa – arranger, conductor
- Ernie Freeman – arranger
- Neal Hefti – arranger
- Gordon Jenkins – arranger
- Johnny Mandel – arranger
- Billy May – arranger
- Sy Oliver – arranger
- Nelson Riddle – arranger
- Freddie Stulce – arranger
- Sonny Burke – conductor, producer
- Morris Stoloff
- Quincy Jones – arranger

== Charts ==
Chart (1965)	Peak position
US Billboard 200	9

== Certifications ==
Region	Certification	Certified units/sales
United States (RIAA)	Platinum	1,000,000^{^}
^{^} Shipments figures based on certification alone.
