= My Kind of Broadway =

Studio album by Frank Sinatra
- Released: 1965
- Recorded: May 2, 1961 – August 23, 1965
- Studio: United, Hollywood
- Genre: Vocal jazz; traditional pop; show tunes
- Length: 35:09
- Label: Reprise; FS 1015
- Producer: Sonny Burke

Frank Sinatra chronology
September of My Years (1965)	My Kind of Broadway (1965)	A Man and His Music (1965)

My Kind of Broadway is a 1965 studio album by the American singer Frank Sinatra. It is a collection of songs from various musicals, pieced together from different recording sessions over the previous four years. The album features songs from nine arrangers and composers, the most ever on a single Sinatra album. While the title of the album is My Kind of Broadway, both the Gershwin songs on the album, "They Can't Take That Away From Me" and "Nice Work If You Can Get It", were written by George and Ira Gershwin for films (Shall We Dance and A Damsel in Distress respectively, both from 1937) and not for Broadway musicals.

Professional ratings
Review scores
Source	Rating
AllMusic	3/5 stars
Record Mirror	5/5 stars

== Track listing ==
1. "Everybody Has the Right to Be Wrong (At Least Once)" (Sammy Cahn, Jimmy Van Heusen)^{ab} – 2:05
2. "Golden Moment" (Kenny Jacobson, Rhoda Roberts)^{ad} – 3:01
3. "Luck Be a Lady" (Frank Loesser)^{eg} – 5:15
4. "Lost in the Stars" (Maxwell Anderson, Kurt Weill)^{cd} – 4:08
5. "Hello, Dolly!" (Jerry Herman)^{hij} – 2:45
6. "I'll Only Miss Her When I Think of Her" (Cahn, Van Heusen)^{abq} – 2:50
7. "They Can't Take That Away from Me" (George Gershwin, Ira Gershwin)^{kl} – 2:40
8. "Yesterdays" (Otto Harbach, Jerome Kern)^{mn} – 3:45
9. "Nice Work If You Can Get It" (G. Gershwin, I. Gershwin)^{kl} – 2:33
10. "Have You Met Miss Jones?" (Richard Rodgers, Lorenz Hart)^{fg} – 2:30
11. "Without a Song" (Vincent Youmans, Billy Rose, Edward Eliscu)^{op} – 3:37

== Charts ==
Chart (1965)	Peak position
US Billboard 200	30
