= The September of My Years =

Song by Frank Sinatra

from the album September of My Years
- A-side: "That's Life"
- Released: 1965
- Recorded: May 27, 1965
- Genre: Traditional pop
- Length: 3:26
- Label: Reprise Records
- Composer: Jimmy Van Heusen
- Lyricist: Sammy Cahn
- Producer: Sonny Burke

"The September of My Years" is a song about nostalgia composed in 1965 by Jimmy Van Heusen, with lyrics by Sammy Cahn, and introduced by Frank Sinatra as the title track of his 1965 album of the same name.

At the Grammy Awards of 1966, "The September of My Years" was nominated for the Grammy Award for Song of the Year.

== Notable recordings ==
- Frank Sinatra - September of My Years (1965), Sinatra at the Sands with Count Basie (1966), Sinatra: Vegas (2006)
- Bob Dylan - Triplicate (2017)
