= Country Music Association Award for Album of the Year =

Annual music award

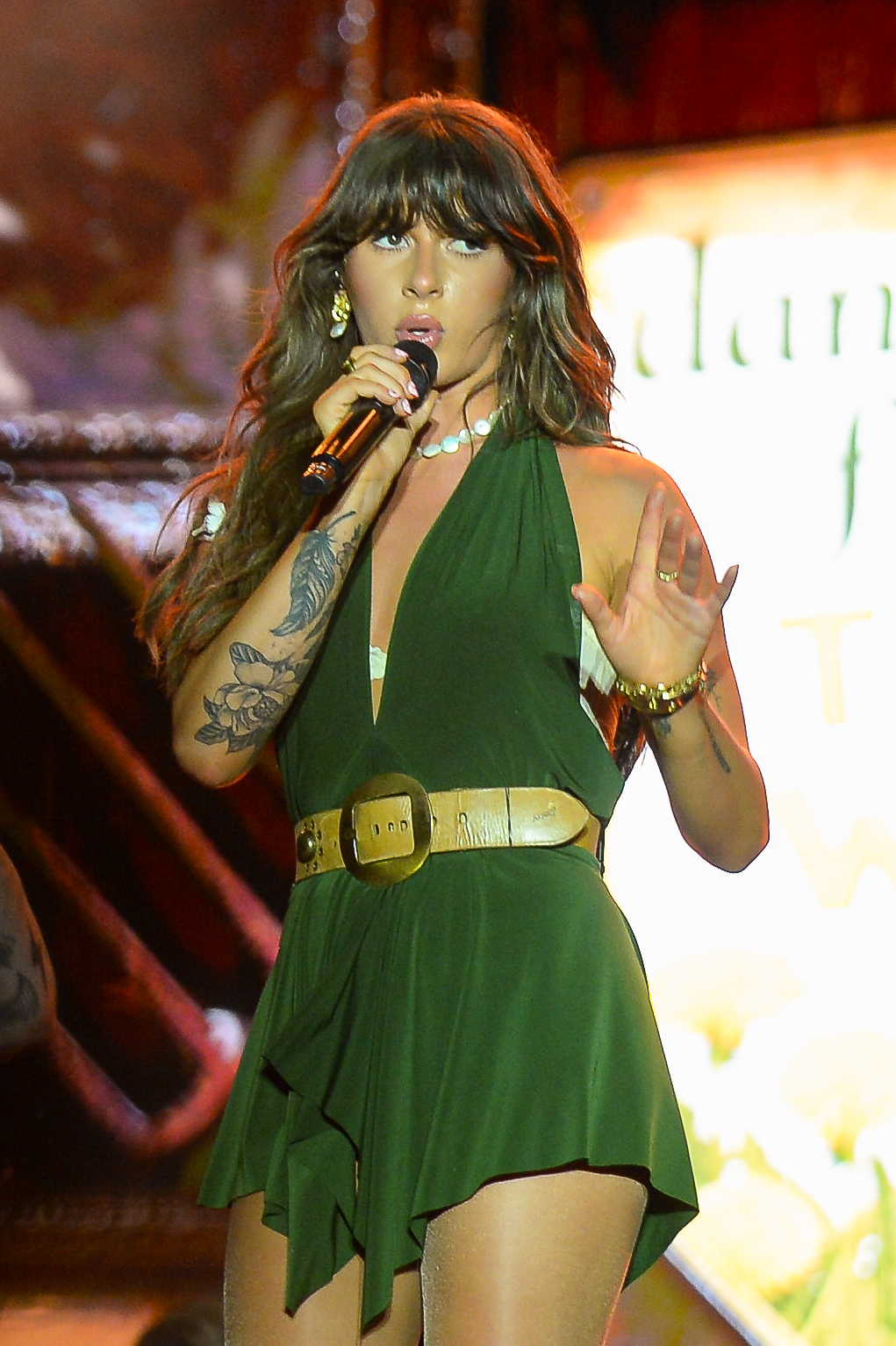
- Current winner of the award Ella Langley
- Country: United States
- Presented by: Country Music Association
- First award: 1967
- Currently held by: Dandelion by Ella Langley (2026)

The following list shows the recipients for the Country Music Association Award for Album of the Year.

The inaugural recipient of the award was There Goes My Everything by Jack Greene in 1967, with Jessi Colter becoming the first female winner in 1976, and Alabama being the first group awarded in 1983. George Strait holds the record for most wins in the category, with five, and also leads in nominations, with eighteen. To date, Miranda Lambert and Lainey Wilson are the only women to have won twice. Miranda Lambert is tied with Reba McEntire as the most nominated women in the category, with six nominations each. Brooks & Dunn hold the record for most nominations without a win, with eight.

== Eligibility ==
According to the Country Music Association, this award is given to the artist, producer and mix engineer. The album should be judged on all aspects including, but not limited to, artist's performance, musical background, engineering, packaging, design, art, layout and liner notes. At least 75% of the recordings on the album must have achieved peak national prominence during the eligibility period. Greatest hits albums or compilation albums consisting of previously released recordings are not eligible for this award.

The album must have charted on Billboard’s Top Country Albums chart for the first time during the eligibility period. However, if the album charted on Billboard’s Top Country Albums chart prior to the eligibility period, but achieved its highest chart position for the first time during the eligibility period, it is eligible unless it has previously appeared on a Final Ballot in this category.

== Recipients ==
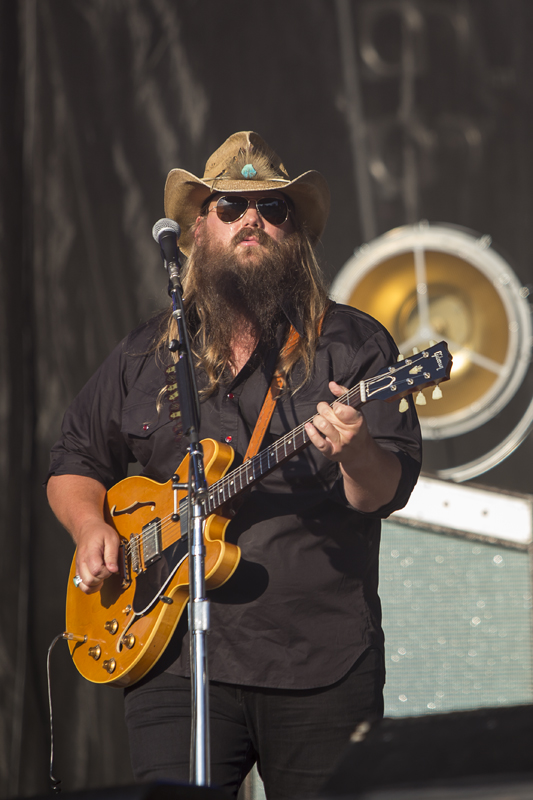
Three-time winner Chris Stapleton

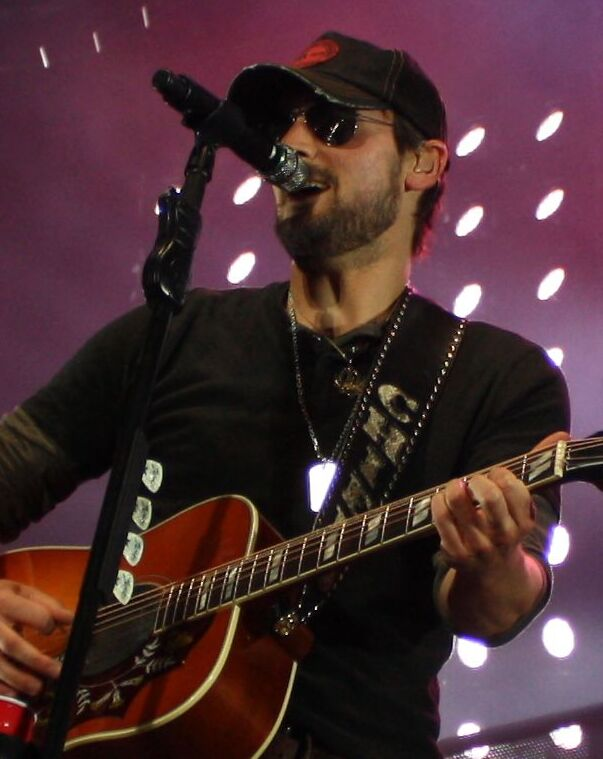
2012 and 2016 winner Eric Church

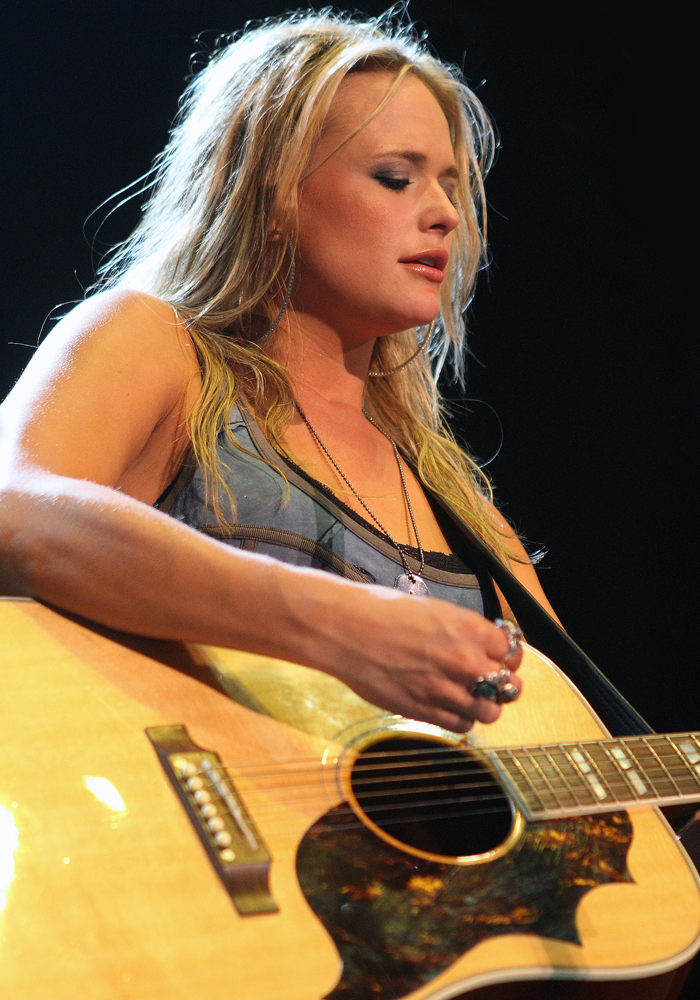
Two-time recipient Miranda Lambert

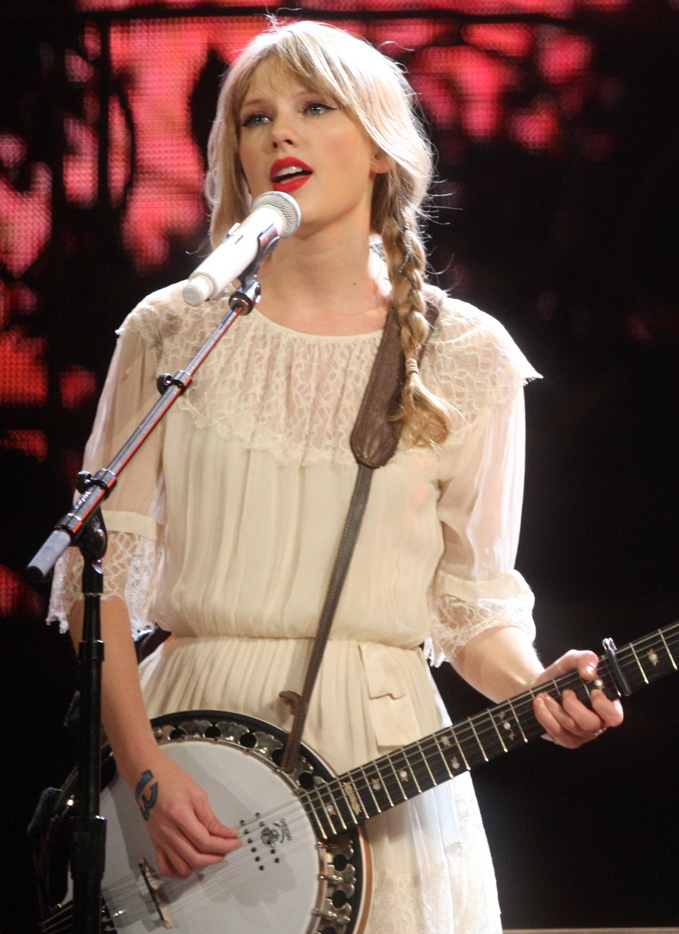
2009 honoree Taylor Swift has also won Entertainer of the Year twice.

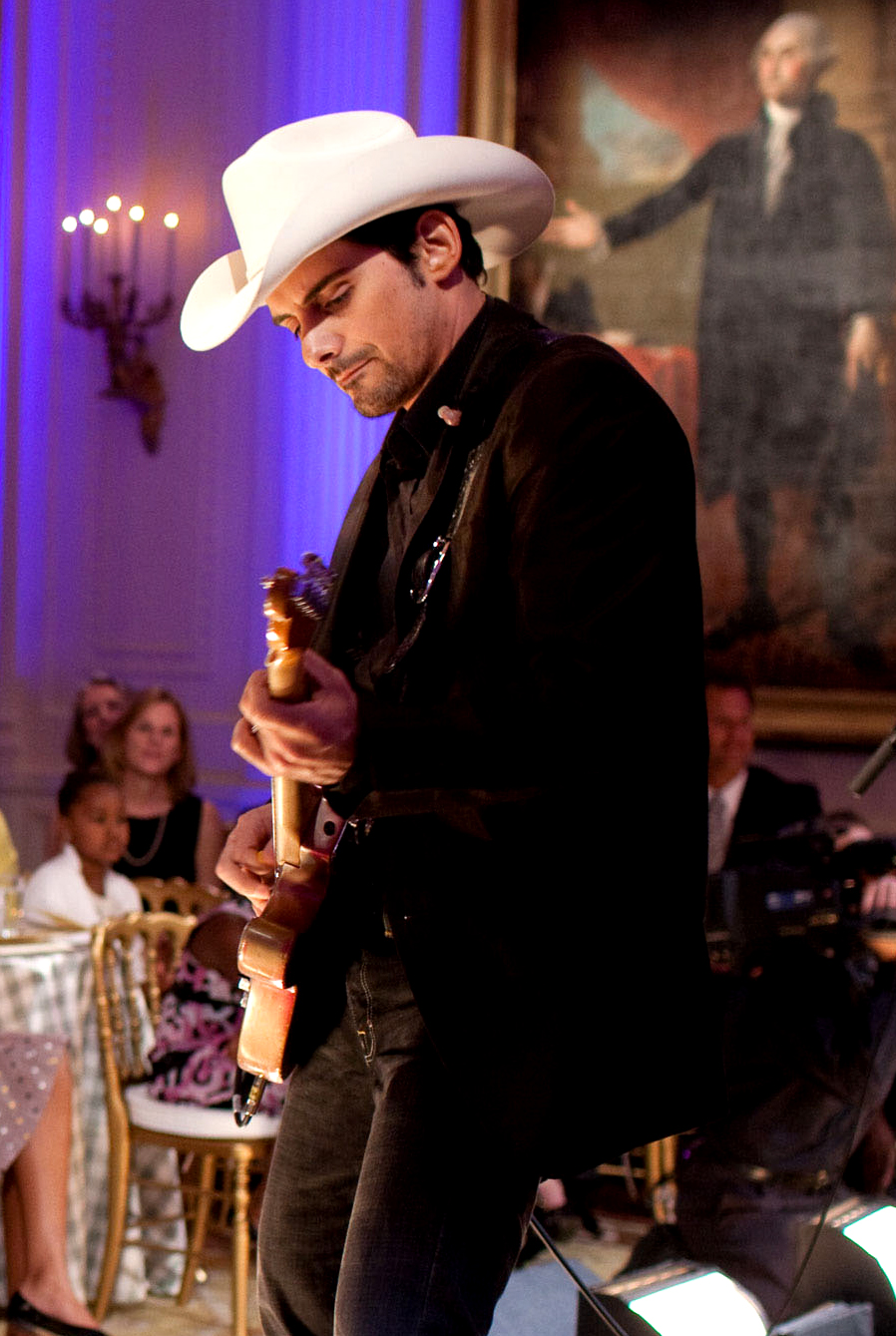
2006 winner Brad Paisley.

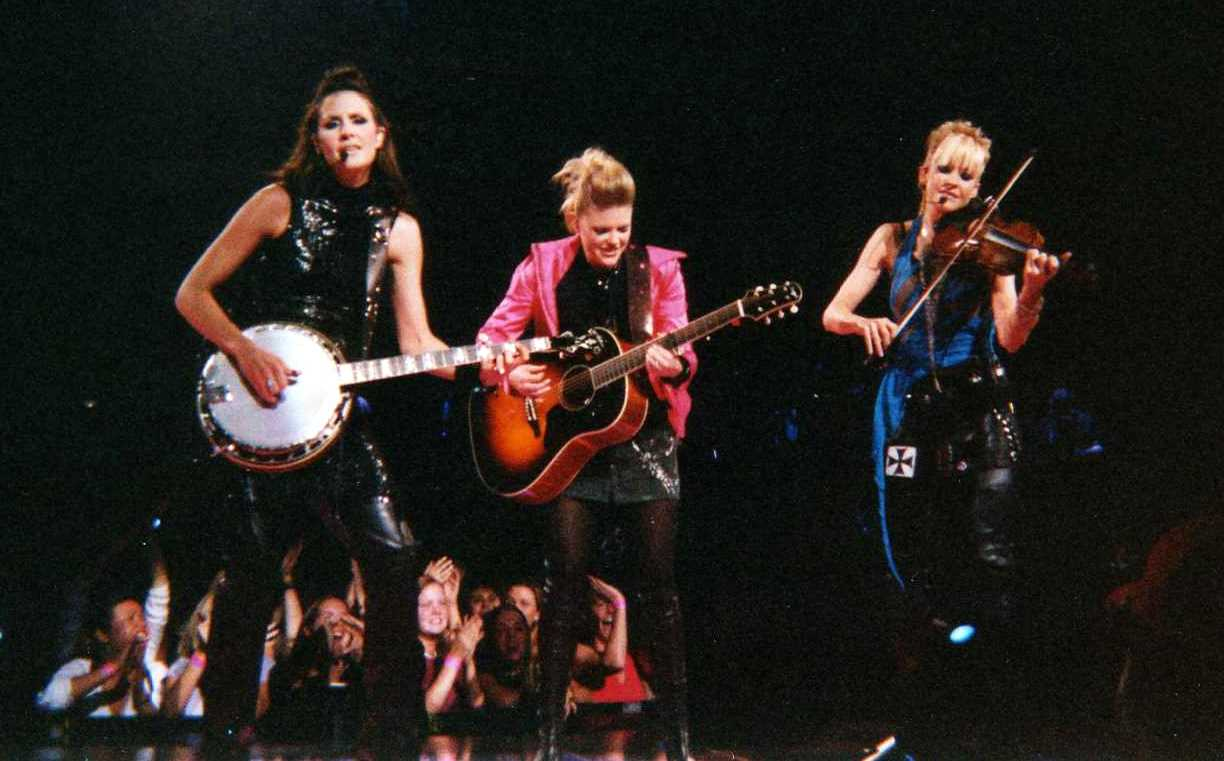
Dixie Chicks are the only female group to win Album of the Year

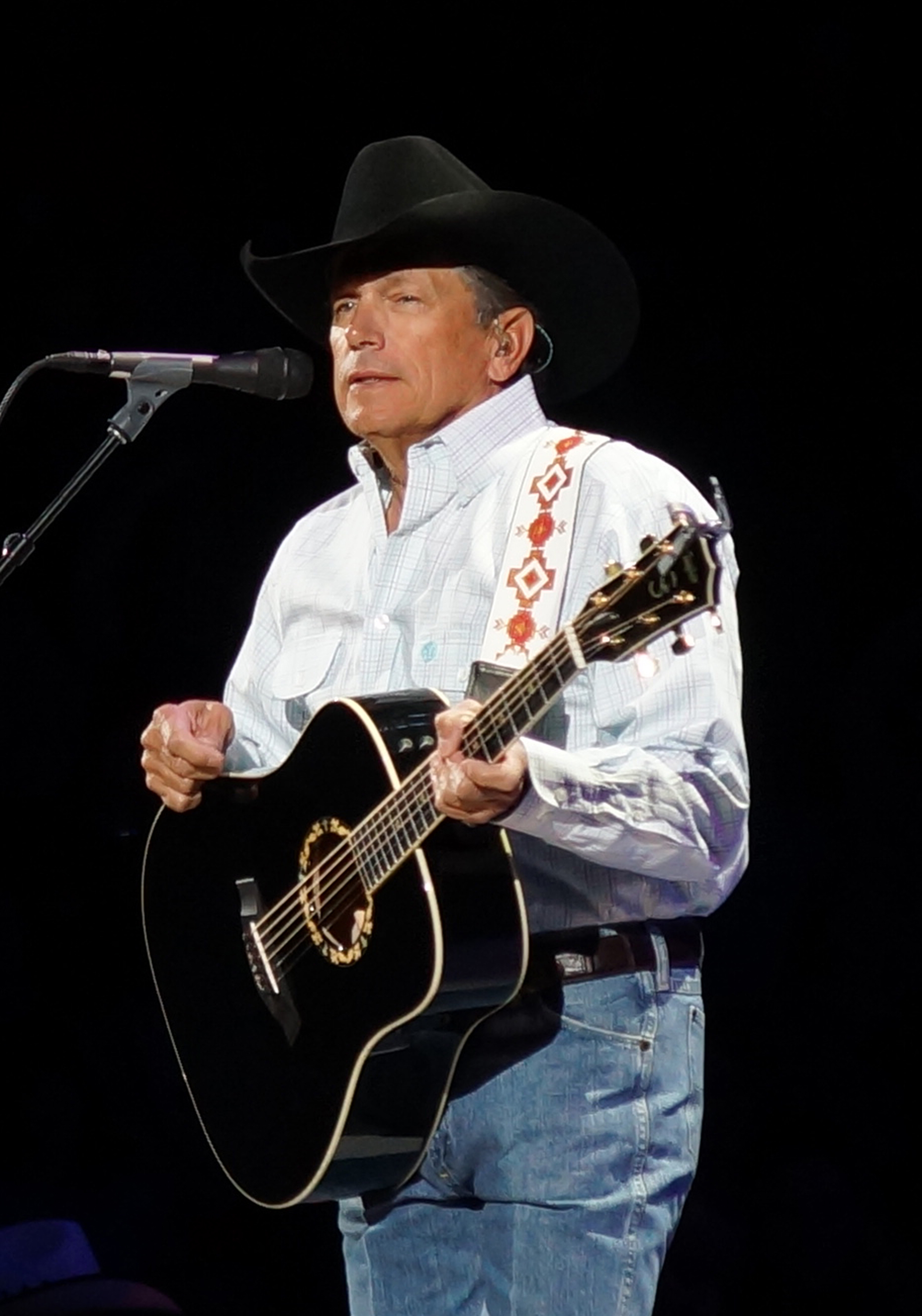
Five-time Album of the Year honoree George Strait

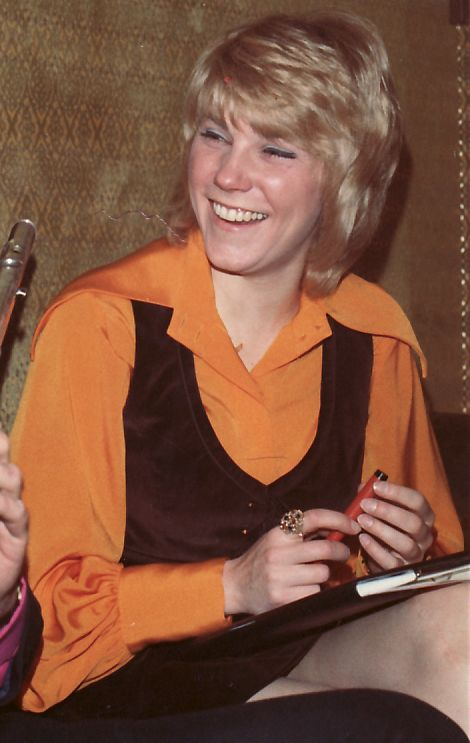
1984 winner Anne Murray is the inaugural solo female and only non—American recipient.

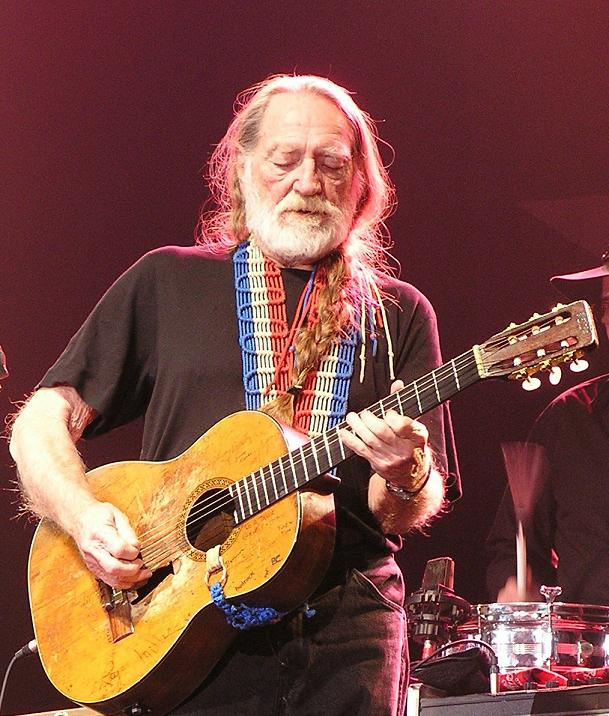
1976 and 1982 recipient Willie Nelson

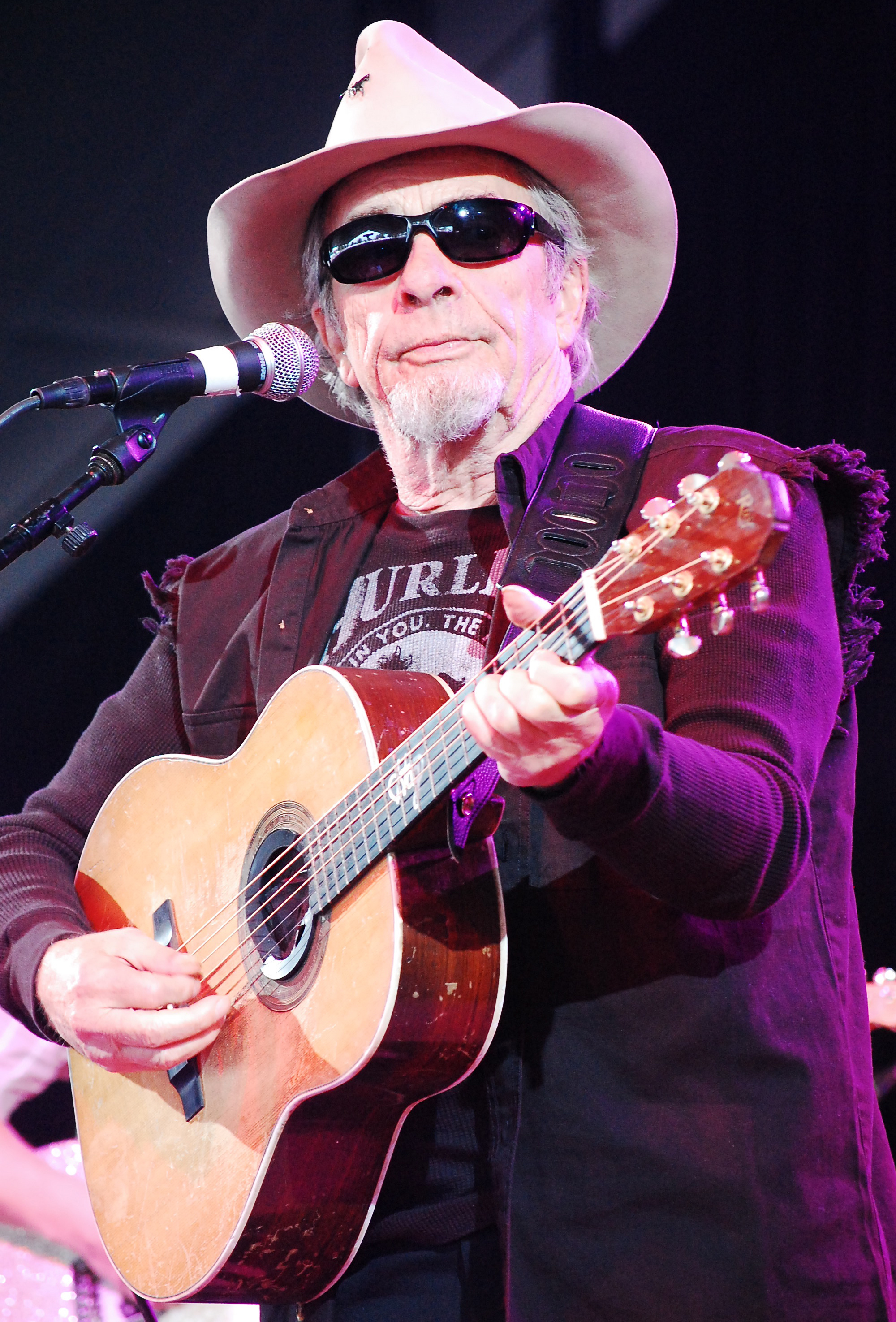
Eleven—time nominee and two—time winner Merle Haggard.

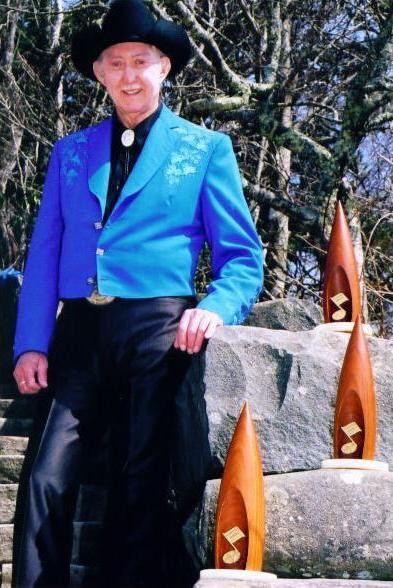
Inaugural recipient Jack Greene also won Male Vocalist Single of the Year awards at the 1967 ceremony.

Year	Winners	Artist	Nominees
2026	Dandelion	Ella Langley	Ain’t in It for My Health — Zach Top; Middle of Nowhere — Kacey Musgraves; Parker McCollum — Parker McCollum; The Way I Am — Luke Combs
2025	Whirlwind	Lainey Wilson	Am I Okay? — Megan Moroney; Cold Beer & Country Music — Zach Top; F-1 Trillion — Post Malone; I’m the Problem — Morgan Wallen
2024	Leather	Cody Johnson	Higher — Chris Stapleton; Deeper Well — Kacey Musgraves; Fathers & Sons — Luke Combs; Whitsitt Chapel — Jelly Roll
2023	Bell Bottom Country	Lainey Wilson	Ashley McBryde presents: Lindeville — Ashley McBryde; Gettin' Old — Luke Combs; One Thing at a Time — Morgan Wallen; Rolling Up the Welcome Mat — Kelsea Ballerini
2022	Growin' Up	Luke Combs	Humble Quest — Maren Morris; Palomino — Miranda Lambert; Sayin' What I'm Thinkin' — Lainey Wilson; Time, Tequila & Therapy — Old Dominion
2021	Starting Over	Chris Stapleton	29 — Carly Pearce; Dangerous: The Double Album — Morgan Wallen; Heart — Eric Church; Skeletons — Brothers Osborne
2020	What You See Is What You Get	Luke Combs	Heartache Medication — Jon Pardi; Never Will — Ashley McBryde; Old Dominion — Old Dominion; Wildcard — Miranda Lambert
2019	Girl	Maren Morris	Center Point Road — Thomas Rhett; Cry Pretty — Carrie Underwood; Dan + Shay — Dan + Shay; Desperate Man — Eric Church
2018	Golden Hour	Kacey Musgraves	From A Room: Volume 2 — Chris Stapleton; Graffiti U — Keith Urban; Life Changes — Thomas Rhett; The Mountain — Dierks Bentley
2017	From A Room: Volume 1	Chris Stapleton	The Breaker — Little Big Town; Heart Break — Lady Antebellum; The Nashville Sound — Jason Isbell and the 400 Unit; The Weight of These Wings — Miranda Lambert
2016	Mr. Misunderstood	Eric Church	Black — Dierks Bentley; Hero — Maren Morris; Ripcord — Keith Urban; Storyteller — Carrie Underwood
2015	Traveller	Chris Stapleton	Old Boots, New Dirt — Jason Aldean; The Big Revival — Kenny Chesney; Pageant Material — Kacey Musgraves; Pain Killer — Little Big Town
2014	Platinum	Miranda Lambert	Crash My Party — Luke Bryan; Fuse — Keith Urban; The Outsiders — Eric Church; Riser — Dierks Bentley
2013	Based on a True Story...	Blake Shelton	Tornado — Little Big Town; Same Trailer Different Park — Kacey Musgraves; Red — Taylor Swift; Blown Away — Carrie Underwood
2012	Chief	Eric Church	Home — Dierks Bentley; Tailgates & Tanlines — Luke Bryan; Own the Night — Lady Antebellum; Four the Record — Miranda Lambert
2011	My Kinda Party	Jason Aldean	This Is Country Music — Brad Paisley; All About Tonight — Blake Shelton; Speak Now — Taylor Swift; You Get What You Give — Zac Brown Band
2010	Revolution	Miranda Lambert	Up on the Ridge — Dierks Bentley; Need You Now — Lady Antebellum; Twang — George Strait; Play On — Carrie Underwood
2009	Fearless	Taylor Swift	American Saturday Night — Brad Paisley; That Lonesome Song — Jamey Johnson; Love on the Inside — Sugarland; Defying Gravity — Keith Urban
2008	Troubadour	George Strait	Cowboy Town — Brooks & Dunn; Just Who I Am: Poets & Pirates — Kenny Chesney; Good Time — Alan Jackson; Carnival Ride — Carrie Underwood
2007	It Just Comes Natural	George Strait	Long Trip Alone — Dierks Bentley; These Days — Vince Gill; 5th Gear — Brad Paisley; Love, Pain & the Whole Crazy Thing — Keith Urban
2006	Time Well Wasted	Brad Paisley	Hillbilly Deluxe — Brooks & Dunn; The Road and the Radio — Kenny Chesney; Precious Memories — Alan Jackson; Me and My Gang — Rascal Flatts
2005	There's More Where That Came From	Lee Ann Womack	Live Like You Were Dying — Tim McGraw; Feels Like Today — Rascal Flatts; Somewhere Down in Texas — George Strait; Be Here — Keith Urban
2004	When the Sun Goes Down	Kenny Chesney	Red Dirt Road — Brooks & Dunn; Shock'n Y'all — Toby Keith; Mud on the Tires — Brad Paisley; Here for the Party — Gretchen Wilson
2003	American IV: The Man Comes Around	Johnny Cash	Home — Dixie Chicks; Man with a Memory — Joe Nichols; Tim McGraw and the Dancehall Doctors — Tim McGraw; Unleashed — Toby Keith
2002	Drive	Alan Jackson	New Favorite — Alison Krauss and Union Station; No Shoes, No Shirt, No Problems — Kenny Chesney; Pull My Chain — Toby Keith; The Great Divide — Willie Nelson; The Road Less Traveled — George Strait
2001	O Brother, Where Art Thou?	Various Artists^{[A]}	Born to Fly — Sara Evans; Set This Circus Down — Tim McGraw; Steers & Stripes — Brooks & Dunn; When Somebody Loves You — Alan Jackson
2000	Fly	Dixie Chicks	Breathe — Faith Hill; I Hope You Dance — Lee Ann Womack; Under the Influence — Alan Jackson; Who Needs Pictures — Brad Paisley
1999	A Place in the Sun	Tim McGraw	Always Never the Same — George Strait; The Key — Vince Gill; Two Teardrops — Steve Wariner; Where Your Road Leads — Trisha Yearwood
1998	Everywhere	Tim McGraw	Come on Over — Shania Twain; Long Stretch of Lonesome — Patty Loveless; One Step at a Time — George Strait; Sevens — Garth Brooks
1997	Carrying Your Love with Me	George Strait	Blue — LeAnn Rimes; Did I Shave My Legs for This? — Deana Carter; Everybody Knows — Trisha Yearwood; Everything I Love — Alan Jackson
1996	Blue Clear Sky	George Strait	Borderline — Brooks & Dunn; High Lonesome Sound — Vince Gill; The Trouble with the Truth — Patty Loveless; Wild Angels — Martina McBride
1995	When Fallen Angels Fly	Patty Loveless	John Michael Montgomery — John Michael Montgomery; Lead On — George Strait; When Love Finds You — Vince Gill; Who I Am — Alan Jackson
1994	Common Thread: The Songs of the Eagles	Various Artists^{[B]}	Tribute to The Music of Bob Wills & his Texas Playboys — Asleep at the Wheel; Easy Come Easy Go — George Strait; Rhythm, Country and Blues — Various Artists^{[C]}; Who I Am — Alan Jackson
1993	I Still Believe in You	Vince Gill	A Lot About Livin' (And a Little 'bout Love) — Alan Jackson; Come On, Come On — Mary Chapin Carpenter; Hard Workin' Man — Brooks & Dunn; The Chase — Garth Brooks
1992	Ropin' the Wind	Garth Brooks	Brand New Man — Brooks & Dunn; For My Broken Heart — Reba McEntire; What Do I Do with Me — Tanya Tucker; Wynonna — Wynonna Judd
1991	No Fences	Garth Brooks	Don't Rock the Jukebox — Alan Jackson; Pocket Full of Gold — Vince Gill; Put Yourself in My Shoes — Clint Black; Rumor Has It — Reba McEntire
1990	Pickin' on Nashville	The Kentucky Headhunters	Here in the Real World — Alan Jackson; I Wonder Do You Think of Me — Keith Whitley; Livin' It Up — George Strait; RVS III — Ricky Van Shelton
1989	Will the Circle Be Unbroken: Volume Two	Nitty Gritty Dirt Band	Beyond the Blue Neon — George Strait; Loving Proof — Ricky Van Shelton; Old 8×10 — Randy Travis; Willow in the Wind — Kathy Mattea
1988	Born to Boogie	Hank Williams Jr.	Chiseled in Stone — Vern Gosdin; Diamonds and Dirt — Rodney Crowell; If You Ain't Lovin' You Ain't Livin' — George Strait; Untasted Honey — Kathy Mattea
1987	Always And Forever	Randy Travis	Trio — Emmylou Harris, Linda Ronstadt and Dolly Parton; Wine Colored Roses — George Jones; What Am I Gonna Do About You — Reba McEntire; Ocean Front Property — George Strait
1986	Lost in the Fifties Tonight	Ronnie Milsap	7 — George Strait; Rockin' with the Rhythm — The Judds; Storms of Life — Randy Travis; Whoever's in New England — Reba McEntire
1985	Does Fort Worth Ever Cross Your Mind	George Strait	40—Hour Week — Alabama; Country Boy — Ricky Skaggs; My Kind of Country — Reba McEntire; Why Not Me — The Judds
1984	A Little Good News	Anne Murray	Don't Cheat in Our Hometown — Ricky Skaggs; Right or Wrong — George Strait; Roll On — Alabama; That's the Way Love Goes — Merle Haggard
1983	The Closer You Get	Alabama	Highways & Heartaches — Ricky Skaggs; It Ain't Easy — Janie Fricke; Pancho & Lefty — Willie Nelson and Merle Haggard; Wild and Blue — John Anderson
1982	Always on My Mind	Willie Nelson	Big City — Merle Haggard; Bobbie Sue — Oak Ridge Boys; Mountain Music — Alabama; Still the Same Ole Me — George Jones
1981	I Believe in You	Don Williams	9 to 5 and Odd Jobs — Dolly Parton; Feels So Right — Alabama; I Am What I Am — George Jones; Out Where the Bright Lights Are Glowing — Ronnie Milsap
1980	Coal Miner's Daughter	Sissy Spacek; Beverly D'Angelo; Levon Helm	Just Good Ol' Boys — Moe Bandy and Joe Stampley; Kenny — Kenny Rogers; Roses in the Snow — Emmylou Harris; There's a Little Bit of Hank in Me — Charley Pride
1979	The Gambler	Kenny Rogers	Armed and Crazy — Johnny Paycheck; One for the Road — Willie Nelson and Leon Russell; Rose Colored Glasses — John Conlee; The Originals — The Statler Brothers
1978	It Was Almost Like a Song	Ronnie Milsap	Country Boy — Don Williams; Heaven's Just a Sin Away — The Kendalls; Here You Come Again — Dolly Parton; Waylon and Willie — Waylon Jennings and Willie Nelson
1977	Ronnie Milsap Live	Ronnie Milsap	I Don't Want to Have to Marry You — Jim Ed Brown and Helen Cornelius; I Remember Patsy — Loretta Lynn; Kenny Rogers — Kenny Rogers; Ol' Waylon — Waylon Jennings
1976	Wanted! The Outlaws	Jessi Colter; Tompall Glaser; Waylon Jennings; Willie Nelson	200 Years of Country Music — Sonny James; Night Things — Ronnie Milsap; Teddy Bear — Red Sovine; The Blind Man in the Bleachers — Kenny Starr
1975	A Legend in My Time	Ronnie Milsap	An Evening with John Denver — John Denver; Before the Next Teardrop Falls — Freddie Fender; Feelins' — Loretta Lynn and Conway Twitty; Rhinestone Cowboy — Glen Campbell; The Ramblin' Man — Waylon Jennings
1974	Very Special Love Songs	Charlie Rich	Country Bumpkin — Cal Smith; If We Make It Through December — Merle Haggard; If You Love Me, Let Me Know — Olivia Newton—John; You've Never Been This Far Before — Conway Twitty
1973	Behind Closed Doors	Charlie Rich	Entertainer of the Year — Loretta Lynn; Louisiana Woman, Mississippi Man — Loretta Lynn and Conway Twitty; Satin Sheets — Jeanne Pruett; The Storyteller — Tom T. Hall
1972	Let Me Tell You About a Song	Merle Haggard	Charley Pride Sings Heart Songs — Charley Pride; Coat of Many Colors — Dolly Parton; Lead Me On — Loretta Lynn and Conway Twitty; The Happiest Girl in the Whole U.S.A. — Donna Fargo
1971	I Won't Mention It Again	Ray Price	A Tribute to the Best Damn Fiddle Player in the World (or, My Salute to Bob Wills) — Merle Haggard; Help Me Make It Through the Night — Sammi Smith; Rose Garden — Lynn Anderson; When You're Hot, You're Hot — Jerry Reed
1970	Okie from Muskogee	Merle Haggard	The Fightin' Side of Me — Merle Haggard; Hello Darlin' — Conway Twitty; Hello, I'm Johnny Cash — Johnny Cash; Just Plain Charley — Charley Pride
1969	Johnny Cash At San Quentin	Johnny Cash	Charley Pride Live and in Person — Charley Pride; Same Train, a Different Time — Merle Haggard; Stand by Your Man — Tammy Wynette; Wichita Lineman — Glen Campbell
1968	Johnny Cash at Folsom Prison	Johnny Cash	By the Time I Get to Phoenix — Glen Campbell; Gentle on My Mind — Glen Campbell; The Best of Merle Haggard — Merle Haggard; D—I—V—O—R—C—E — Tammy Wynette
1967	There Goes My Everything	Jack Greene	The Best of Eddy Arnold — Eddy Arnold; I'm a Lonesome Fugitive — Merle Haggard; The Best of Sonny James — Sonny James; Danny Boy — Ray Price

Notes
A. Award presented to: Norman Blake, The Fairfield Four, Emmylou Harris, John Hartford, James Carter and the Prisoners, Chris Thomas King, Alison Krauss, Harry McClintock, Sarah Peasall, Hannah Peasall, Leah Peasall, Soggy Bottom Boys, Stanley Brothers, Ralph Stanley, Gillian Welch and The Whites
B. Award presented to: John Anderson, Clint Black, Suzy Bogguss, Brooks & Dunn, Billy Dean, Diamond Rio, Vince Gill, Alan Jackson, Little Texas, Lorrie Morgan, Travis Tritt, Tanya Tucker and Trisha Yearwood
C. Nominees were: Chet Atkins, Clint Black, Natalie Cole, Vince Gill, Al Green, George Jones, B.B. King, Gladys Knight, Patti LaBelle, Little Richard, Lyle Lovett, Reba McEntire, Sam Moore, Aaron Neville, The Pointer Sisters, The Staple Singers, Marty Stuart, Allen Toussaint, Travis Tritt, Tanya Tucker, Conway Twitty, Trisha Yearwood

== Artists with multiple wins ==
Artists that received multiple awards
Awards	Artist
5	George Strait
4	Ronnie Milsap
3	Chris Stapleton
3	Johnny Cash
2	Alan Jackson
2	Charlie Rich
2	Eric Church
2	Merle Haggard
2	Miranda Lambert
2	Luke Combs
2	Tim McGraw
2	Vince Gill
2	Willie Nelson
2	Lainey Wilson

== Artists with multiple nominations ==
18 nominations

- George Strait

12 nominations

- Alan Jackson

11 nominations

- Merle Haggard

8 nominations

- Brooks & Dunn
- Vince Gill

6 nominations

- Brad Paisley
- Conway Twitty
- Dierks Bentley
- Keith Urban
- Miranda Lambert
- Reba McEntire
- Ronnie Milsap
- Willie Nelson

5 nominations

- Alabama
- Carrie Underwood
- Eric Church
- Chris Stapleton
- Kenny Chesney
- Loretta Lynn
- Tim McGraw

4 nominations

- Charley Pride
- Dolly Parton
- Garth Brooks
- Glen Campbell
- George Jones
- Johnny Cash
- Trisha Yearwood
- Waylon Jennings
- Kacey Musgraves
- Luke Combs

3 nominations

- Clint Black
- Emmylou Harris
- Kenny Rogers
- Lady A
- Lainey Wilson
- Little Big Town
- Maren Morris
- Morgan Wallen
- Patty Loveless
- Randy Travis
- Ricky Skaggs
- Tanya Tucker
- Taylor Swift
- Toby Keith
- Wynonna Judd (Note: Including two as a member of The Judds.)

2 nominations

- Alison Krauss
- Ashley McBryde
- Dixie Chicks
- Don Williams
- Jason Aldean
- John Anderson
- Kathy Mattea
- Lee Ann Womack
- Luke Bryan
- Old Dominion
- Rascal Flatts
- Ray Price
- Ricky Van Shelton
- Sonny James
- Tammy Wynette
- The Judds
- Thomas Rhett
- Travis Tritt
- Zach Top
