= Down from the Mountain =

2000 film by D. A. Pennebaker

- The DVD cover
- Directed by: Nick Doob; Chris Hegedus; D. A. Pennebaker
- Produced by: Bob Neuwirth; Frazer Pennebaker
- Starring: John Hartford; Ralph Stanley; Emmylou Harris; Alison Krauss; Gillian Welch; David Rawlings
- Cinematography: Joan Churchill; Nick Doob; Chris Hegedus; Bob Neuwirth; Jehane Noujaim; D. A. Pennebaker; Jojo Pennebaker
- Edited by: Nick Doob; D. A. Pennebaker
- Distributed by: Mike Zoss Productions
- Release date: December 2000
- Running time: 98 minutes
- Country: United States
- Language: English

Down from the Mountain is a 2000 documentary and concert film featuring a live performance by country and traditional music artists who participated in the Grammy-winning soundtrack recording for the Joel and Ethan Coen film, O Brother, Where Art Thou?. The concert, held at the Ryman Auditorium in Nashville, Tennessee on May 24, 2000, was a benefit for the Country Music Hall of Fame and Museum. The documentary was directed by Nick Doob, Chris Hegedus and D. A. Pennebaker. The artists in the concert also participated in a Down from the Mountain concert tour.

== Summary ==
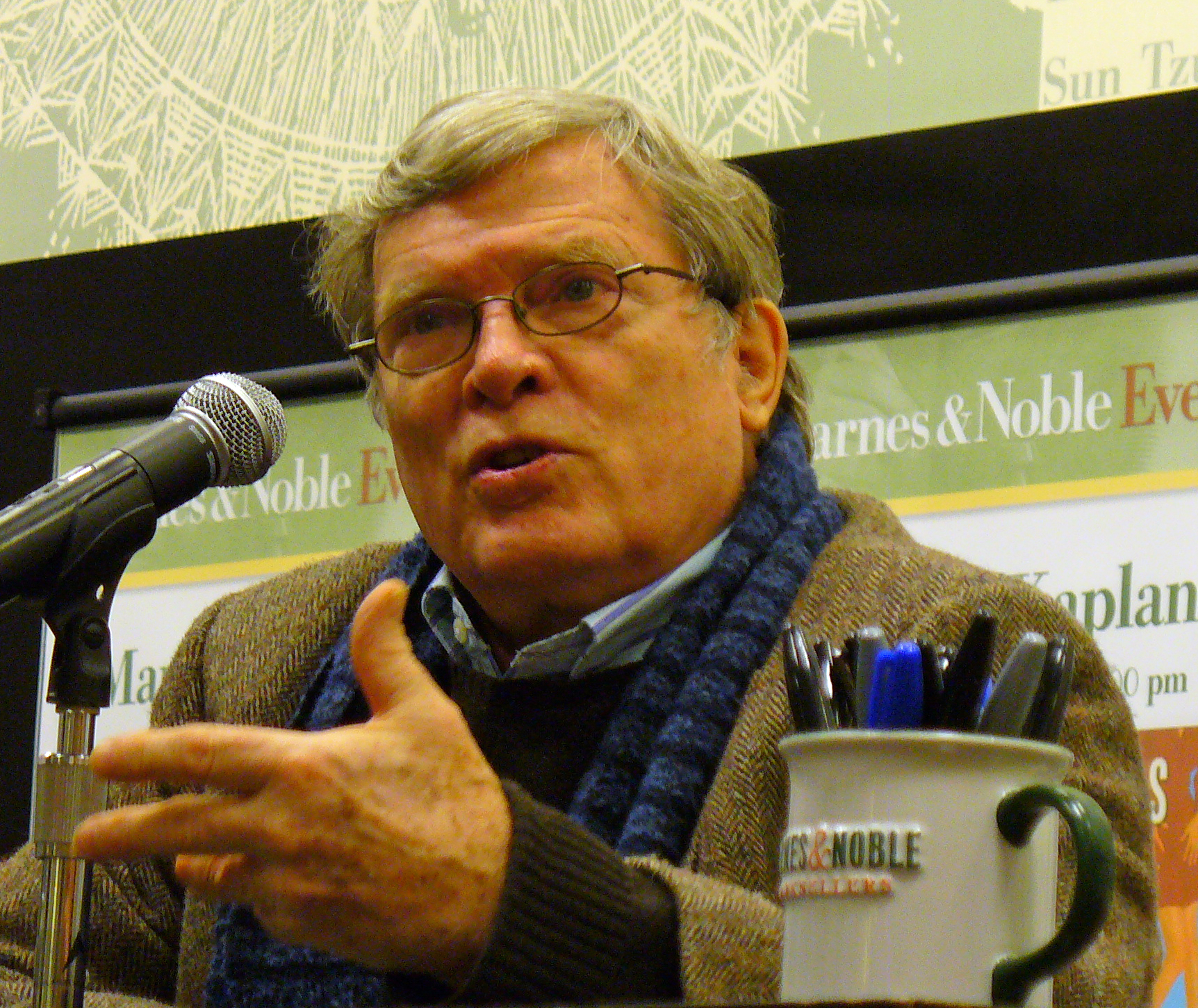
Documentarian D. A. Pennebaker, director of such musical documentary films as Dont Look Back and Monterey Pop, co-directed Down from the Mountain.

The concert portion of the film is preceded by a 30-minute section in which the various artists are seen rehearsing for the show, doing soundchecks, and talking backstage at the Ryman Auditorium.

Time is spent with bluegrass star Ralph Stanley, who rides in a limousine to Nashville, Tennessee, and is interviewed on radio station WSM, whose DJ introduces him as "the newest member of WSM's Grand Ole Opry", despite his having performed professionally as a country musician since the 1960s.

John Hartford, who acts as master of ceremonies for the concert, is interviewed while piloting a paddlewheeler riverboat, and he talks about his time as a towboat pilot on the Upper Mississippi and Illinois rivers. He mentions that he had to stop when his cancer got too bad, and, indeed, this film marks Hartford's last filmed appearance before his death on June 4, 2001, of non-Hodgkin lymphoma.

T-Bone Burnett is seen working with the girl trio, The Peasall Sisters, instructing guitarist Chris Sharp to increase the tempo on their number, "In the Highways", and "do it like a rock and roll song". When Sharp has trouble understanding him, Burnett asks the musician, "You can't relate to rock and roll?"

Emmylou Harris reveals her obsession with Major League Baseball, showing that she carries a Motorola "Sports Trax" pager that tracks the action in all the games being played that day.

Gillian Welch explains that Harris and Alison Krauss take delight in making her sing the highest part in their trio, "Didn't Leave Nobody but the Baby", even though both Harris and Krauss have higher-register voices. Harris sang the bass part on the song, which is unusual for the singer, who is well known for her role as the "angel" vocalist in her duets and backing vocals with other artists.

Tim Blake Nelson, a member of the O Brother, Where Art Thou? cast who can be seen on stage during the finale of the concert ("Angel Band"), is seen backstage talking to Emmylou Harris. He recalls a performance of hers that he attended, which was on her birthday, and Harris remembers that she had remarked she was "38 with a bullet".

The concert is introduced by Holly Hunter, another member of the film cast. She explains the presence of cameramen on the stage by making a joke about it being "dress-down Wednesday" at the FBI and saying that several agents have joined the performance that night. The Coen brothers can be seen in the crowd during the show, as can Billy Bob Thornton.

== Performances in the film ==
1. "Po' Lazarus" (arrangement by Alan Lomax) – performed by Fairfield Four (Isaac Freeman, Wilson Waters, Robert Hamlett, Joseph Rice and Nathan Best) (vocals)
2. "Big Rock Candy Mountain" (traditional) – performed by John Hartford (vocals and fiddle), Mike Compton (mandolin), Chris Sharp (guitar), and Larry Perkins (bass)
3. "Wild Bill Jones" (traditional) – performed by Alison Krauss and Union Station (Alison Krauss (vocals and fiddle), Dan Tyminski (vocals and guitar), Barry Bales (bass), Jerry Douglas (dobro), Ron Block (banjo)) with Mike Compton (mandolin)
4. "Blue and Lonesome" (written by Bill Monroe and Hank Williams) – performed by Alison Krauss and Union Station
5. "Green Pastures" (traditional) – performed by Emmylou Harris (vocals and guitar) with Gillian Welch (vocals), David Rawlings (vocals and guitar), Jerry Douglas (dobro), and Barry Bales (bass)
6. "Indian War Whoop" (written by Hoyt Ming and Pep Steppers) – performed by John Hartford (fiddle), Gillian Welch (vocals), Mike Compton (mandolin), Chris Sharp (guitar), and Larry Perkins (bass)
7. "Didn't Leave Nobody but the Baby" (arrangement by Alan Lomax, T-Bone Burnett and Gillian Welch) – performed by Emmylou Harris, Alison Krauss, and Gillian Welch (vocals)
8. "John Law Burned Down the Liquor Sto'" (written by Chris Thomas King) – performed by Chris Thomas King and Colin Linden (slide resonator guitars and vocals), Mike Compton (mandolin), and Barry Bales (bass)
9. "I Am Weary (Let Me Rest)" (written by Pete Kuykendall (Pete Roberts)) – performed by The Cox Family (Suzanne Cox (vocals and mandolin), Evelyn Cox (guitar), Sidney Cox (vocals and banjo), Willard Cox (vocals and fiddle)) with Mike Compton (mandolin) and Barry Bales (bass)
10. "Will There Be Any Stars In My Crown" (traditional) – performed by The Cox Family (Suzanne Cox (vocals and mandolin), Evelyn Cox (vocals and guitar), Sidney Cox (banjo), Willard Cox (vocals and fiddle)) with Mike Compton (mandolin) and Barry Bales (bass)
11. "In the Highways" (written by Maybelle Carter) – performed by Leah, Sarah, and Hannah Peasall (vocals) with Chris Sharp (guitar)

After "In the Highways", there is an intermission announcement followed by footage of Emmylou Harris playing guitar and singing the beginning of "Red Dirt Girl" (from the album of the same name) backstage before the concert resumes.

1. "Down in the River to Pray" (traditional) – performed by Alison Krauss with the First Baptist Church Choir of White House, Tennessee (vocals)
2. "Man of Constant Sorrow" (arrangement by Ed Haley) – John Hartford (fiddle)
3. "Dear Someone" (written by Gillian Welch and David Rawlings) – performed by Gillian Welch and David Rawlings (vocals and guitar) with John Hartford (fiddle) and Mike Compton (mandolin)
4. "I Want to Sing That Rock and Roll" (written by Gillian Welch and David Rawlings) – performed by Gillian Welch and David Rawlings (vocals and guitar)
5. "Keep on the Sunny Side" (written by Ada Blenkhorn and J. Howard Entwisle) – performed by The Whites (Sharon White (vocals and guitar), Cheryl White (vocals and bass), Buck White (vocals and mandolin)) with Jerry Douglas (dobro)
6. "Shove That Hog's Foot Further in the Bed" (written by Ed Haley) – performed by John Hartford (vocals and fiddle), Mike Compton (mandolin), Chris Sharp (guitar), and Larry Perkins (bass)
7. "O Death" (traditional) – performed by Ralph Stanley (vocals)
8. "Angel Band" (traditional) – performed by Ralph Stanley with all of the other musicians (vocals and various instruments)

"I'll Fly Away" (written by Albert E. Brumley) plays during the end credits of the film, and the end of the performance of the song during the concert (by Gillian Welch and Alison Krauss (vocals) with Mike Compton (mandolin) and Chris Sharp (guitar)) can be seen after the credits finish.

== Soundtrack album ==
Down from the Mountain: Live Concert Performances by the Artists & Musicians of O Brother, Where Art Thou?

Soundtrack album by various artists
- Released: July 24, 2001
- Recorded: May 24, 2000; Ryman Auditorium; Nashville, Tennessee
- Genres: Traditional, bluegrass, country, gospel, blues
- Length: 43:07
- Label: Lost Highway
- Producer: T-Bone Burnett

Professional ratings
Review scores
Source	Rating
Allmusic	3.5/5 stars

The soundtrack album, Down from the Mountain: Live Concert Performances by the Artists & Musicians of O Brother, Where Art Thou? was released to complement the documentary concert film. It has the complete versions of songs that are interrupted in the film by backstage chatter, including "John Law Burned Down the Liquor Sto'" by Chris Thomas King and Colin Linden and "Will There Be Any Stars In My Crown?" by The Cox Family. One track on the album, "Sandy Land" (written by Ramona Jones) performed by The Whites, does not appear in the film.

=== Track listing ===
1. "Introduction" (Holly Hunter) / "Po' Lazarus" (Fairfield Four) – 4:38
2. "Big Rock Candy Mountain" (John Hartford) – 4:39
3. "Wild Bill Jones" (Alison Krauss and Union Station, featuring Dan Tyminski) – 4:13
4. "Blue and Lonesome" (Alison Krauss and Union Station) – 4:00
5. "I Am Weary (Let Me Rest)" (The Cox Family) – 3:34
6. "Will There Be Any Stars In My Crown" (The Cox Family) – 3:06
7. "Dear Someone" (Gillian Welch and David Rawlings) – 3:11
8. "I Want To Sing That Rock and Roll" (Gillian Welch and David Rawlings) – 2:55
  - This recording also appears on Welch's album Time (The Revelator) (2001).
9. "Sandy Land" (The Whites) – 2:34
10. "John Law Burned Down the Liquor Sto'" (Chris Thomas King with Colin Linden) – 4:26
11. "Green Pastures" (Emmylou Harris) – 3:26
12. "I'll Fly Away" (Gillian Welch and Alison Krauss) – 4:05

=== Chart performance ===
==== Weekly charts ====
Chart (2001)	Peak position
US Billboard 200	102
US Top Country Albums (Billboard)	10

==== Year-end charts ====
Chart (2001)	Position
Canadian Country Albums (Nielsen SoundScan)	81
US Top Country Albums (Billboard)	56
Chart (2002)	Position
US Top Country Albums (Billboard)	35

== Reception ==
On review aggregator website Rotten Tomatoes, the film holds an approval rating of 97% based on 31 reviews, with an average rating of 7.5/10.

== See also ==
- O Brother, Where Art Thou? (soundtrack)
