= O Brother, Where Art Thou? (soundtrack) =

2000 soundtrack album by various artists, expanded and reissued in 2011

Soundtrack album by various artists
- Released: December 5, 2000
- Recorded: (modern tracks) Spring 1999
- Studios: Sound Emporium (Nashville, Tennessee)
- Genres: Country; old time; folk; bluegrass; blues; gospel; Americana
- Length: 61:24
- Label: Lost Highway/Mercury
- Producer: T-Bone Burnett

O Brother, Where Art Thou? (released in Europe as O Brother, Where Art Thou?: Music from the Motion Picture) is the soundtrack album of music from the 2000 American film O Brother, Where Art Thou?. The film was written, directed and produced by the Coen Brothers and stars George Clooney, John Turturro, Tim Blake Nelson, and John Goodman, and included original cast members' singing voices. Among other honors, it won the Grammy Award for Album of the Year at the 44th Grammy Awards on February 27, 2002.

O Brother, Where Art Thou? is set in Mississippi during the Great Depression in the United States. The soundtrack, produced by T-Bone Burnett, includes a variety of bluegrass music, country music, gospel music, blues, and Southern American folk music with a sound contemporaneous to the time period. With the exception of a few vintage tracks (such as Harry McClintock's 1928 single "Big Rock Candy Mountain"), most tracks are modern recordings.

The soundtrack was reissued on August 23, 2011, with 14 new tracks that were not included in the original album, "including 12 previously unreleased cuts from music producer T-Bone Burnett's O Brother sessions."

== Development and sound ==
The soundtrack was conceived as a major component of the film, not merely as a background or support. For this reason it was decided to record the soundtrack before filming. T-Bone Burnett and Alan Larman were invited to design collections of music.

Dirges and other macabre songs recurring in Appalachian music, such as "O Death", "Lonesome Valley", "Angel Band", and "I Am Weary", appear in the film as a contrast to the bright, cheerful songs like "Keep On the Sunnyside" and "In the Highways". Ralph Stanley of The Stanley Brothers personally recorded the a cappella folk song "O Death".

"I Am a Man of Constant Sorrow" has five variations: two are used in the film, one in the music video, and two in the album. Two of the variations feature the verses being sung back-to-back, and the other three variations feature additional music between each verse. The voices of the Soggy Bottom Boys were provided by Dan Tyminski (lead vocal on "I Am a Man of Constant Sorrow"), Nashville songwriter Harley Allen, and the Nashville Bluegrass Band's Pat Enright.

== Reception and legacy ==
Professional ratings
Aggregate scores
Source	Rating
Metacritic	83/100
Review scores
Source	Rating
AllMusic	4.5/5 stars
The Austin Chronicle	4/5 stars
Entertainment Weekly	B+
Pitchfork	8.3/10
Q	4/5 stars
Rolling Stone	3.5/5 stars
The Rolling Stone Album Guide	4/5 stars
Uncut	4/5 stars

O Brother, Where Art Thou? won the Grammy Award for Album of the Year in 2002, the Grammy Award for Best Country Collaboration with Vocals (for singer Dan Tyminski, whose voice overdubbed George Clooney's in the film on "I Am a Man of Constant Sorrow", Nashville songwriter Harley Allen, and the Nashville Bluegrass Band's Pat Enright), and the Grammy Award for Best Male Country Vocal Performance for "O, Death" by Ralph Stanley. It is one of only three movie soundtracks to have ever won the Grammy for Album of the Year.

The album won the Album of the Year Award (only the second soundtrack to ever do so) and Single of the Year Award for "I Am a Man of Constant Sorrow" at the Country Music Association Awards. It also won the Album of the Year Award at the 37th Academy of Country Music Awards and took home 2 International Bluegrass Music Awards: Album of the Year and Gospel Recorded Performance of the Year (for Alison Krauss and Gillian Welch on "I'll Fly Away").

In 2006, the album ranked No. 38 on CMT's 40 Greatest Albums in Country Music. In 2009, Rhapsody ranked it No. 8 on the "Country's Best Albums of the Decade" list. Engine 145 Country Music Blog ranked it No. 5 on the "Country's Best Albums of the Decade" list. In 2010, All Songs Considered, a program on NPR, included the soundtrack album on their list of "The Decade's 50 Most Important Recordings".

Some of the artists on the soundtrack album played a concert at the Ryman Auditorium in Nashville, Tennessee, which was recorded in the 2000 documentary film, Down from the Mountain.

On August 23, 2011, a 10th anniversary edition was released featuring a bonus disc with 14 new tracks that were not included in the original album, all but two of which were previously unreleased songs from Burnett's original sessions.

== Commercial performance ==
The album charted at No. 1 on Billboard 200 in 2001 and spent over 20 weeks on the Billboard Top Country Albums Chart. The soundtrack CD became a best seller; it was first certified Gold by the RIAA on February 9, 2001, and reached 8 times Platinum by October 10, 2007. It has sold 8,175,800 copies in the United States as of October 2019.

== Track listing ==
No.	Title	Writer(s)	Artist	Length
1.	"Po' Lazarus" (recorded 1959 by Alan Lomax)	traditional	James Carter and the Prisoners	4:31
2.	"Big Rock Candy Mountain" (recorded 1928)	Harry McClintock	Harry McClintock	2:16
3.	"You Are My Sunshine"	Jimmie Davis, Charles Mitchell	Norman Blake	4:26
4.	"Down to the River to Pray"	traditional	Alison Krauss	2:55
5.	"I Am a Man of Constant Sorrow" (radio station version)	Dick Burnett	Dan Tyminski, Pat Enright, & Harley Allen (credited as The Soggy Bottom Boys)	3:10
6.	"Hard Time Killing Floor Blues"	Skip James	Chris Thomas King	2:42
7.	"I Am a Man of Constant Sorrow" (instrumental)	Dick Burnett	Norman Blake	4:28
8.	"Keep on the Sunny Side"	Ada Blenkhorn, J. Howard Entwisle	The Whites	3:33
9.	"I'll Fly Away"	Albert E. Brumley	Alison Krauss, Gillian Welch	3:57
10.	"Didn't Leave Nobody But the Baby"	traditional	Emmylou Harris, Alison Krauss, Gillian Welch	1:57
11.	"In the Highways"	Maybelle Carter	The Peasall Sisters	1:35
12.	"I Am Weary (Let Me Rest)"	Pete Roberts	The Cox Family	3:13
13.	"I Am a Man of Constant Sorrow" (instrumental)	Dick Burnett, arranged by Ed Haley	John Hartford	2:34
14.	"O Death"	Lloyd Chandler	Ralph Stanley	3:19
15.	"In the Jailhouse Now"	Blind Blake, Jimmie Rodgers	Tim Blake Nelson and Pat Enright (credited as The Soggy Bottom Boys)	3:34
16.	"I Am a Man of Constant Sorrow" (with band)	Dick Burnett	Dan Tyminski, Pat Enright, & Harley Allen (credited as The Soggy Bottom Boys)	4:16
17.	"Indian War Whoop" (instrumental)	Hoyt Ming	John Hartford	1:30
18.	"Lonesome Valley"	traditional	The Fairfield Four	4:07
19.	"Angel Band" (recorded 1955)	traditional	The Stanley Brothers	2:15
Total length:				60:18

10th Anniversary Deluxe Edition bonus disc
No.	Title	Artist	Length
1.	"Hard Time Killing Floor Blues"	Colin Linden	1:15
2.	"You Are My Sunshine"	Alan O'Bryant	3:29
3.	"Tishomingo Blues"	John Hartford	2:01
4.	"I'll Fly Away" (recorded 1956)	The Kossoy Sisters with Erik Darling	2:32
5.	"Big Rock Candy Mountain"	Van Dyke Parks	1:42
6.	"Tom Devil" (recorded 1959 by Alan Lomax)	Ed Lewis and the Prisoners	5:19
7.	"Keep on the Sunny Side"	The Cox Family	2:36
8.	"Angel Band"	Hannah, Leah, Sarah Peasall and Robert Hamlett	0:58
9.	"Big Rock Candy Mountain"	Norman Blake	2:18
10.	"Little Sadie"	Norman Blake	1:50
11.	"In the Highways"	The Cox Family	2:12
12.	"Hogfoot"	John Hartford	3:47
13.	"The Lord Will Make a Way"	The Fairfield Four	2:36
14.	"In the Jailhouse Now"	Harley Allen	3:05
Total length:			35:40

The 10th Anniversary bonus disc includes five songs that were used in the movie. The bonus disc versions of "You Are My Sunshine" and "I'll Fly Away" are the ones used in the film, not the versions on the original soundtrack album. Both the original album and the bonus disc versions of "Hard Time Killing Floor Blues", "Keep on the Sunny Side", and "Angel Band" are used in the film.

The music credits for the movie list two songs, "Admiration" (written by William Tyers and performed by Pat Rebillo) and "What Is Sweeter" (written by M. K. Jerome), which are not included on either edition of the soundtrack album.

== Personnel ==
- Norman Blake – Performer, guitar, vocals
- Jerry Douglas – Dobro
- Alison Krauss – Vocals, harmony vocals
- Chris Sharp – Rhythm guitar
- The Stanley Brothers – Performers
- Ralph Stanley – Performer
- Sam Bush – Mandolin
- Emmylou Harris – Performer
- John Hartford – Fiddle, vocals
- The Fairfield Four – Performer
- Ed Haley – Arranger
- The Whites:
  - Buck White – Mandolin, vocals, harmony vocals
  - Cheryl White – Bass, Vocals, harmony vocals
  - Sharon White – Guitar, vocals
- Mike Compton – Guitar, mandolin
- Alan Lomax – Arranger
- Harley Allen – Vocals, harmony vocals
- Barry Bales – Bass
- Ron Block – Banjo
- Curtis Burch – Dobro
- T Bone Burnett – Arranger, producer
- The Cox Family:
  - Evelyn Cox – Guitar
  - Sidney Cox – Banjo, vocals, harmony vocals
  - Suzanne Cox – Mandolin, vocals
  - Willard Cox – Vocals, harmony vocals
- Stuart Duncan – Fiddle
- Pat Enright – Vocals, harmony vocals, yodeling
- Isaac Freeman – Bass, vocals, lead
- James Hill – Vocals
- Harry McClintock – Performer
- Tim O'Brien – Vocals
- Maura O'Connell – Vocals
- Carter Stanley – Arranger
- Dan Tyminski – Guitar, vocals
- Wilson Waters – Tenor sax, vocals
- Robert K. Oermann – Liner notes
- Sam Phillips – Vocals
- Gillian Welch – Arranger, vocals
- Dub Cornett – Vocals
- Chris Thomas King – Guitar, vocals
- David Rawlings – Vocals
- Gavin Lurssen – Mastering
- Mike Piersante – Mixing
- Peter Kurland – Location recording
- First Baptist Church of Norfolk Choir – Vocals
- Chris Sharp – Guitar
- Nathaniel Best – Lead
- Robert Hamlett – Vocals
- Joseph Rice – Vocals
- The Peasall Sisters
  - Sarah Peasall – Alto vocal, guitar, harmony vocals
  - Hannah Peasall – Soprano vocal, mandolin
  - Leah Peasall – Tenor vocal, violin, harmony vocals
- The Soggy Bottom Boys – Performer
- Tim Blake Nelson – Vocals, performer
- Porter McClister – Tenor backup vocals
- James Carter and The Prisoners – Performers
- Alan Larman – Musicologist

== Chart performance ==
=== Weekly charts ===
Chart (2000–2002)	Peak position
Australian Albums (ARIA)	15
Austrian Albums (Ö3 Austria)	70
Canadian Albums (Billboard)	3
French Albums (SNEP)	9
German Albums (Offizielle Top 100)	87
New Zealand Albums (RMNZ)	14
US Billboard 200	1
US Top Country Albums (Billboard)	1
US Soundtrack Albums (Billboard)	1

=== Year-end charts ===
Year-end chart performance for O Brother, Where Art Thou?
Chart (2001)	Position
Canadian Albums (Nielsen SoundScan)	31
Canadian Country Albums (Nielsen SoundScan)	2
US Billboard 200	23
US Top Country Albums (Billboard)	2
US Soundtrack Albums (Billboard)	1
Worldwide Albums (IFPI)	16
Chart (2002)	Position
Canadian Albums (Nielsen SoundScan)	19
Canadian Country Albums (Nielsen SoundScan)	3
US Billboard 200	6
US Top Country Albums (Billboard)	1
US Soundtrack Albums (Billboard)	1
Chart (2003)	Position
US Soundtrack Albums (Billboard)	11
Chart (2004)	Position
US Soundtrack Albums (Billboard)	14
Chart (2013)	Position
US Soundtrack Albums (Billboard)	25
Chart (2014)	Position
US Soundtrack Albums (Billboard)	24
Chart (2015)	Position
US Soundtrack Albums (Billboard)	22
Chart (2016)	Position
US Soundtrack Albums (Billboard)	21
Chart (2017)	Position
US Soundtrack Albums (Billboard)	25

== Certifications ==
Region	Certification	Certified units/sales
Australia (ARIA)	Gold	35,000^{^}
Canada (Music Canada)	4× Platinum	400,000^{^}
United Kingdom (BPI)	Platinum	300,000^{^}
United States (RIAA)	8× Platinum	8,175,800
^{^} Shipments figures based on certification alone.

== See also ==
- Down from the Mountain
