= I'll Fly Away =

Christian hymn frequently adapted to other styles

- by Albert E. Brumley
- Genre: Hymn
- Text: by Albert E. Brumley
- Language: English
- Meter: 9.4.9.4
- Melody: "I'll Fly Away"
- Composed: 1929
- Published: 1932

"I'll Fly Away" (Roud 18437) is a hymn written between 1929 and 1932 by Albert E. Brumley and published in 1932 by the Hartford Music company in a collection titled Wonderful Message. Albert took three years to write the song after getting the idea while picking cotton in 1928. Over the years multiple derivative versions have been created and will be licensed for decades to come. Brumley's writing was influenced by the 1924 secular ballad "The Prisoner's Song".

"I'll Fly Away" has been called the most recorded gospel song. It is frequently used in worship services by Baptists, Pentecostals, Nazarenes, the Churches of Christ and many Presbyterians and Methodists. It appears in many hymnals where it is listed under the topics of eternal life, heaven and acceptance. It is a standard song at bluegrass jam sessions and is often performed at funerals, including jazz funerals in the New Orleans tradition.

== History ==
Albert E. Brumley has been described as the "pre-eminent gospel songwriter" of the 20th century with over 600 published songs. Other popular songs by Brumley include "Jesus, Hold My Hand", "Turn Your Radio On", "I'll Meet You in the Morning", and "This World Is Not My Home". According to interviews, Brumley came up with the idea for the song while picking cotton on his father's farm in Rock Island, Oklahoma. He says that as he worked he was "humming the old ballad that went like this: 'If I had the wings of an angel, over these prison walls I would fly,' and suddenly it dawned on me that I could use this plot for a gospel-type song." The song he described appears to be "The Prisoner's Song". Brumley worked out the rest of the song over three years, paraphrasing one line from the secular ballad to read, "Like a bird from prison bars has flown", using prison as a metaphor for earthly life. He stated, "When I wrote it, I had no idea that it would become so universally popular." Other earlier nineteenth century slave songs also contained similar lyrics, stating: "I'll fly away to glory; I'll fly away to my heavenly home, And I'll shout glory."

== Recordings ==
=== The Selah Jubilee Singers ===
"I'll Fly Away"

Single by Selah Jubilee Singers
- Released: ?
- Recorded: February 21, 1941
- Genre: gospel
- Label: Decca 7831 (reissued Document DOCD 5499)
- Songwriter: Albert E. Brumley

One of the earliest recordings of "I'll Fly Away" was made by the Selah Jubilee Singers in February 1941 for Decca Records. The group was founded around 1927 by Thermon Ruth, a disc jockey at radio station WOR in Brooklyn New York.

- [Released date?] – Decca 7831 – "Hide me in thy Bosom"/"I'll Fly Away"

=== James and Martha Carson ===
"I'll Fly Away"

Single by James and Martha Carson
- Released: 1951
- Recorded: ?
- Genre: gospel
- Label: Capitol 1415
- Songwriter: Albert E. Brumley

James and Martha Carson, also known as the "Barn Dance Sweethearts" released their first recordings on White Church in 1947 and later signed with Capitol in 1949. They recorded 22 numbers for Capitol and "I'll Fly Away" is one of a half-dozen that "did well" for them.

- 1951 – Capitol 1415 – "I'll Fly Away"/"We Will Rise and Shine"

=== The Chuck Wagon Gang ===
"I'll Fly Away"

Single by Chuck Wagon Gang
- Released: 1950(?)
- Recorded: December 16, 1948
- Genre: gospel
- Label: Columbia
- Songwriter: Albert E. Brumley

The Chuck Wagon Gang's 1948 recording of "I'll Fly Away" for Columbia sold over one million copies. It ranks among the top selling gospel records of all-time and is listed among the top selling songs of the 1940s in general. In 1950, Billboard reported that American disc jockeys voted the Chuck Wagon Gang "18th most popular of all singing groups in the nation," considering all music genres, and the third most popular recording artist for Columbia. Hank Williams, Sr. released a cover version in 1949.

In a history posted by the current Chuck Wagon Gang, their recording of "I'll Fly Away" is described as the "first commercially licensed" release. Their recording appears to have had two releases on Columbia, first as a B-side in 1949, then as an A-side in 1950.

- 1949 – Columbia 20599 – "Dream Boat"/"I'll Fly Away"
- 1950 – Columbia 20701 – "I'll Fly Away"/"Looking for a City"

In 2017, the Chuck Wagon Gang's recording of "I'll Fly Away" was selected for preservation in the National Recording Registry by the Library of Congress as being "culturally, historically, or aesthetically significant".

=== The Kossoy Sisters ===
In 1956, the Kossoy Sisters included "I'll Fly Away" on the album, Bowling Green, which featured instrumental backing by Erik Darling. The Kossoys, twin sisters Irene Saletan and Ellen Christenson, practiced close harmony singing, which is exemplified on this track. Their recording was introduced to a wider audience when it was included in the 2000 Coen Brothers film, O Brother, Where Art Thou?.

=== George Jones ===
George Jones recorded an energetic version on his classic 1965 gospel LP Old Brush Arbors.

=== The Stanley Brothers ===
The Stanley brothers released a version in 1966 with Ralph Stanley later releasing a solo version on his Shine On album on Rebel Records in 2005.

=== Charley Pride ===
Charley Pride included the song on the 1971 album Did You Think to Pray which peaked at number 1 on Billboard's country album chart.

=== Bob Marley and the Wailers ===
Bob Marley adapted a reggae version in 1973 and recorded it with the Wailers as part of his Rastaman Chant.

=== Alison Krauss and Gillian Welch ===
There have been numerous recordings of "I'll Fly Away" since its inclusion in the 2000 film O Brother Where Art Thou?. Although the Kossoy Sisters recording was used in the film itself, a contemporary recording by Alison Krauss and Gillian Welch was chosen for the O Brother, Where Art Thou? soundtrack. The spare recording, produced by T-Bone Burnett, features Welch on lead vocals with Krauss singing harmony. Their voices are accompanied by Mike Compton on mandolin and Chris Sharp on guitar. The soundtrack sold over eight million copies, reached the top position on at least four of Billboard's album charts, and was named Album of the Year and Best Soundtrack album at the 44th Grammy Awards in February 2002.

Alison Krauss and Gillian Welch performed the song again for a concert of May 24, 2000, at the Ryman Auditorium that featured many of the artists from the O Brother soundtrack. Film from the concert was used to create the 2000 documentary, Down from the Mountain. Krauss and Welch's live performance is included as the final track on the Down from the Mountain soundtrack album, which sold over 500,000 copies, won the Grammy Award for Best Traditional Folk Album, and appeared on several of Billboard's charts.

Both the studio and live performances by Krauss and Welch were popular among folk music disc jockeys. The two recordings were ranked at No. 7 and No. 47 respectively on the Top Songs of 2001 Folk Radio airplay chart.

=== Kanye West ===
"I'll Fly Away" was included as an interlude in Kanye West's 2004 album, The College Dropout. The rendition was sung by Tony Williams.

=== Jars of Clay ===
The Christian rock band Jars of Clay have recorded "I'll Fly Away" twice, first, for the 2004 various artists compilation album, WOW Worship: Red and again for their own 2005 album, Redemption Songs. The latter features guest vocals by Sarah Kelly. Redemption Songs reached No. 1 on Billboard's Top Christian Albums chart and No. 71 on the Billboard 200. Their recording of the song was popular enough on Christian radio to be placed at No. 1 on a list of the Top Songs of 2005 by at least one station.

=== Alan Jackson ===
Alan Jackson included "I'll Fly Away" on his first gospel album, Precious Memories (2006). He offers an up-tempo performance with guitar and piano solos. Jackson's album sold over 1 million copies and reached the top position on Billboard's charts for Top Country Albums and Top Christian Albums, as well as No. 4 on the Billboard 200.

=== Fred Pellerin ===
Quebecois musician and storyteller Fred Pellerin recorded a version of the song sung in french, Je m'envolerai, on his 2019 album Après.

=== J.I.D ===
A familial rendition of "I'll Fly Away", being performed at a close relation's funeral, is featured from 0:10-0:22 of JID's song "Kody Blu 31", off of his 2022 album "The Forever Story".

=== Forrest Frank ===
On his New Hymns album, Forrest Frank covered the song in a lo-fi/rap style with Hulvey.

=== List of recordings ===
This will likely always be an incomplete list. The listings at AllMusic are in excess of 1000 entries.

- 1941 – Selah Jubilee Singers, single (Decca 7831)
- 1968 – The Chambers Brothers on Groovin' Time (Folkways FW31008) [Performed as a medley "Rough and Rocky Road / I'll Fly Away"]
- 1972 – Andy Griffith on Somebody Bigger Than You and I (re-released 1996, Sony)
- 2003 - Randy Travis in his album "Worship & Faith".
- 2005 – Mississippi John Hurt on D.C. Blues: Library of Congress Recordings, Vol. 2 [Recorded July 1963]
- 2006 - Alan Jackson in his album "Precious Memories".
- 2009 - Daniel O'Donnell in his album "Hope and Praise".
- 2017 and 2022 - Reba McEntire in her albums "Sing It Now: Songs of Faith & Hope" as well as "My Chains Are Gone: Hymns and Gospel Favorites".

== Sampling lawsuit ==
"I'll Fly Away" was sampled without permission for the Grammy-winning song "I'll Be Missing You" recorded in 1997 by Puff Daddy and Faith Evans. In 2000, the songwriter's heirs, Albert E. Brumley & Sons, Inc. settled a copyright infringement suit filed against Arista Records, Faith Evans, Illegal Songs Inc., Chyna Baby Music, Janice Combs Publishing Inc., Magnetic Publishing Ltd. and Bad Boy Entertainment. In the settlement, the defendants acknowledged that Albert E. Brumley & Sons were the rightful copyright owners of "I'll Fly Away" and compensated them for an undisclosed amount.

== The Marching Southerners ==
The Jacksonville State University marching band, The Marching Southerners, lead football fans in singing "I'll Fly Away" at the end of each home football game on Burgess–Snow Field. Team members link arm-in-arm with each other before leaving the field and join the band, coaches, cheerleaders, university president and the crowd of fans in singing the hymn.

== In print ==
=== Hymnals and other church texts ===
- African American Heritage Hymnal (#601)
- Baptist Hymnal, 2008 (#601)
- Celebration Hymnal (#779)
- Church Hymnal (#333), 1951 (renewed 1979)
- The Faith We Sing (#2282)
- Favorite Songs and Hymns (#179)
- Heavenly Highway Hymns (#54)
- The New National Baptist Hymnal (#432), 1977
- Sing the Faith: New Hymns for Presbyterians (#2282)

=== Other songbooks ===
- Wonderful Message, Hartford Music Company, 1932 [This is the original publication of the song]
- The Bluegrass Picker's Tune Book, Mel Bay Publications, 2006

== Occurrences in film and television ==
- Two episodes of the television series The Waltons (1971–1980) featured this hymn – one performed on the radio by a studio cover group called "Mayf Nutter & The Sunrise Gospeleers" in the 1975 episode "Breakdown", and the other as a live performance by Jon Walmsley and Linda Purl in the 1977 episode "The Heartbreaker".
- The 1991-93 television series I'll Fly Away was named after the hymn.
- This hymn is played in the 1997 film, The Apostle and is performed by Gary Chapman and Wynonna Judd on the soundtrack.
- The Kossoy Sisters version was used in the 2000 film O Brother, Where Art Thou?, and the Alison Krauss and Gillian Welch version is included on the soundtrack.
- The hymn appears on the soundtrack of Spike Lee's 2006 documentary film When the Levees Broke.
- This Krauss & Welch version was used during the final scene of the final episode ("And Away We Go", 2007) of the television series 7th Heaven.
- The hymn is sung by mourners at a funeral in the 2008 film The Curious Case of Benjamin Button.
- The first-season finale of the 2010 HBO program Treme is named after the hymn, and it is performed at the end of the episode as part of a second line by the Treme Brass Band.
- The hymn is sung by Audra McDonald in "The One Where Diane Joins the Resistance", the third episode of the third season of American legal drama The Good Fight.
- The hymn is sung by multiple credited performers in the 2016 biographical sports film Greater.
- A quest in the 2020 video game Cyberpunk 2077 involving the character Mitch Anderson is named after the hymn.
- The 2022 biopic Elvis features a young Elvis Presley and his band members singing the hymn before going onstage for one of their performances. The film also features a more up-beat version of the hymn sung at a church revival in a flashback scene of Elvis's childhood.
