= Devil and the Bluebird =

2016 book by Jennifer Mason-Black

- Author: Jennifer Mason-Black
- Language: English
- Publisher: Abrams Books
- Publication date: May 17, 2016
- Pages: 336
- ISBN: 978-1-4197-2000-0

Devil and the Bluebird is a 2016 young adult novel by Jennifer Mason-Black.

== Synopsis ==
Blue Riley, a seventeen-year-old folk musician from a small town in Maine, makes a deal with the Devil to save the soul of her missing sister Cass. The deal requires Blue to find her sister within six months or both she and her sister lose their souls. Blue agrees to forfeit her voice to the Devil in exchange for a pair of magical boots that will help her on the journey. Blue begins a trek across the United States to find Cass, carrying her mother's guitar and the magic boots.

Blue's odyssey follows the same route that her dead mother and her mother's partner Tish had taken in the past. During the journey, she struggles with her feelings over Tish abandoning them and her mother's death from cancer.

== Themes and references ==
The novel is a retelling of the Greek epic Odyssey. Caitlyn Paxson of NPR compared it to the Coen brothers' film O Brother, Where Art Thou?, writing that both works "blur the lines between harsh reality and a backwoods sort of magical realism." Justin Barisich of BookPage described the narrative as a modernized version of Faustian lore and the legend that blues musician Robert Johnson had sold his soul to the Devil.

Several critics noted that music, specifically folk and blues music, plays an important role in the novel's style and narrative. Faren Miller of Locus wrote that "Music and the essence of souls are central to this novel in other ways: connected to love and loss, open to possibilities more elusive than dreams of prowess leading to fame and fortune." The protagonist Blue encounters several other runaways during her journey who are escaping mistreatment or abuse. Kirkus Reviews described it as "a tour of America’s marginalized."

== Reception ==
The novel was well received by critics, who praised its interweaving of Americana, folklore, and magical realism. Publishers Weekly gave the book a starred review, and described it as "a magical realist journey of self-discovery and hidden depths, with fascinating characters and a captivating narrative."
