= I'm Blue =

I'm Blue may refer to:

- "Blue (Da Ba Dee)", a song by Eiffel 65
- "I'm Blue (The Gong-Gong Song), an Ike Turner song recorded in 1961
- I'm Blue, Skies, a 2013 album by Cheyenne Jackson
- "I'm Blue, I'm Lonesome", a bluegrass song by Bill Monroe
