= The Peasall Sisters =

American country singing family

- Genres: Country music
- Years active: 2000–2015
- Labels: Varèse Sarabande; Dualtone
- Members: Leah Peasall; Sarah Peasall; Hannah Peasall

The Peasall Sisters were a country harmony group formed by three of the six Peasall siblings. They are best known for their singing in the 2000 film O Brother, Where Art Thou?.

== Biography ==
The six Peasall siblings were born and raised in White House, Tennessee. Group members include Sarah (alto voice, guitar), Hannah (soprano voice, mandolin), and Leah (mezzo-soprano voice, violin).

=== Film participation ===
In the 2000 film O Brother, Where Art Thou?, they provided the singing voices for Ulysses Everett McGill's (George Clooney) daughters, the Wharvey Girls. They sang "In the Highways" and "Angel Band".

The Peasall Sisters – Family Harmony DVD was released in 2006, and shows the sisters with their family and singing.

For the soundtrack of the 2010 film True Grit, the sisters contribute their version of Mosie Lister's gospel song "Where No One Stands Alone".

=== Appearances ===
As part of the Down from the Mountain tour, the sisters performed at the Radio City Music Hall and Carnegie Hall. They have also appeared at the Grand Ole Opry.

=== Awards ===
Their inclusion on the O Brother, Where Art Thou? soundtrack album made the group the youngest vocal group nominated for a contribution to a winner of the Grammy Award for Album of the Year. Their win in the category made Leah Peasall the youngest Grammy winner in history at 8 years old.

=== Recordings ===
The sisters have released two albums: in 2002, First Offering and in 2005 Home to You, on which they are accompanied by artists such as Randy Scruggs, Larry Perkins, Jamie Hartford, and Leroy Troy.

== Discography ==
Solo albums

- 2002: First Offering (Varèse Sarabande)
- 2005: Home To You (Dualtone)

Music films

- 2006: The Peasall Sisters: Family Harmony DVD (Franklin Films)

Film contributions

- 2000: O Brother, Where Art Thou? (Lost Highway / Mercury) - "In the Highways" (in movie and soundtrack album); "Angel Band" (in movie, not on soundtrack album)
- 2010: True Grit - "Where No One Stands Alone" (featured in movie and trailer)

Song contributions

- 1995: "Songs to Tickle Your Tonsils" (Sarah only)
- 2002: VeggieTales - "Junior's Bedtime Songs", "Bob and Larry's Sunday Morning Songs", "Bob and Larry's Backyard Party", and "Pirates' Boatload of Fun" (Leah only)
- 2003: VeggieTales - "O Veggie Where Art Thou?"
- 2004: Various artists - The Unbroken Circle (The Musical Heritage of the Carter Family) (Dualtone) - track 3, "On the Sea of Galilee" (with Emmylou Harris)
- 2007: Various artists - Anchored in Love: A Tribute to June Carter Cash (Dualtone) - track 8, "Road To Kaintuck" (with Billy Bob Thornton)
