= Still Rockin' My Soul =

Studio album by The Fairfield Four
- Released: March 10, 2015
- Genre: Gospel
- Length: 32:45
- Label: Fairfield Four Records

The Fairfield Four chronology
| Beautiful Stars (2002) | Still Rockin' My Soul (2015) |

Still Rockin' My Soul is an album by the Fairfield Four. It earned the group a Grammy Award for Best Roots Gospel Album.

== Track list ==
| No. | Title | Writer(s) | Length |
|---|---|---|---|
| 1. | "Rock My Soul" | Traditional | 0:30 |
| 2. | "Come On In This House" | Traditional | 3:40 |
| 3. | "Baptism of Jesus" | James Hill | 3:38 |
| 4. | "Children Go Where I Send Thee" | Traditional | 4:32 |
| 5. | "Jesus Gave Me Water" | Lucie E. Campbell | 3:02 |
| 6. | "I Love the Lord (He Heard My Cry)" | Traditional | 3:45 |
| 7. | "My Rock" | The Fairfield Four | 4:06 |
| 8. | "I Got Jesus and That’s Enough" | Dorothy Love Coates | 4:02 |
| 9. | "Don’t Let Nobody Turn You Around" | Traditional | 3:40 |
| 10. | "Highway to Heaven" | Rev. Thomas A. Dorsey, Mary Gardner | 3:53 |
| 11. | "I Love the Lord (Reprise)" | Traditional | 6:42 |
