= Hoyt Ming =

American old-time fiddler

Hoyt Ming (October 6, 1902 – April 28, 1985) was an American old-time fiddler.

== Biography ==
Hoyt Ming was born in Choctaw County, Mississippi on October 6, 1902. Later, in his life he married Rozelle Ming (April 25, 1907 - September 29, 1983); the couple performed together for the rest of Hoyt's life. He played fiddle with the Pep Steppers, a family old-time band from Tupelo featuring Hoyt (fiddle), Rozelle (guitar) and Hoyt's brother Troy on mandolin, sometimes billed as "Floyd Ming and the Pep Steppers", instead of using his real name "Hoyt". Hoyt and his band recorded for Ralph Peer and RCA Victor on February 13, 1928 at the Peabody Hotel including their most famous song "Indian War Whoop" which was included on the album Anthology of American Folk Music. The recorded band also featured A.D. Coggins doing the set calling. At the same session the band also recorded "White Mule", "Old Red", and "Tupelo Blues".

Before recording, they played at fiddlers' contests, county fairs, political rallies, and rural picnics— and sometimes for dances, though they disliked the drinking that went on, and as soon as they had young children to bring up, they quit the dance halls. They performed at local dances and fairs until about 1957, when he stopped playing. Interest in the band revived in the 1970s. They took to the stage at the National Folk Festival at Wolf Trap Farm in 1973 in the Washington D.C. area where they would record the album "New Hot Times" and at the 1974 Smithsonian Festival of American Folklife as well as other shows. They also appeared in a film, Ode to Billy Joe.

For most of his life he was a potato farmer. Hoyt sold potato plants, partly direct to other farmers and farming cooperatives, but in high season, from April to the end of July, through small ads in papers like Progressive Farmer and Southern Agriculturist, once counting and bunching 30,000 plants in one day.

== Early life ==
Hoyt learned fiddle at the age of fifteen, while living in Choctaw County, near Ackerman Mississippi. Both his brothers also played musical instruments, his brother Troy learning mandolin and Ethel taking up guitar as to accompany his brothers playing. By 1924, Hoyt had moved to Lee County where he met his wife Rozelle Young, an accomplished musician playing violin, piano, organ, mandolin, and guitar. She would join the band, replacing Ethel on guitar.

== Legacy ==
The Holy Modal Rounders covered "Indian War Whoop" on their 1967 album of the same name. The song was also covered by John Hartford for the soundtrack of the 2000 film O Brother, Where Art Thou?.

"Indian War Whoop" was featured in the 2023 Martin Scorsese film Killers of the Flower Moon, in the scene where Ernest Burkhart first meets his to-be wife. The tune "Tupelo Blues" is performed by the string band during the wedding dance scene.

== Discography ==
=== Peabody Hotel Recordings (1928) ===
Title	Label Number	Recording Location	Recording Date
"Indian War Whoop"	Victor 21294	Memphis, Tennessee	February 13, 1928
"Old Red"	Victor 21294	Memphis, Tennessee	February 13, 1928
"White mule"	Victor 21534	Memphis, Tennessee	February 13, 1928
Tupelo Blues	Victor 21534	Memphis, Tennessee	February 13, 1928

=== New Hot Times (1973) ===
Side	Title	Label	Recording Location	Recording Date
A1	Old Red	Homestead Records (103)	Washington, D.C.	1973
A2	New Hot Times	Homestead Records (103)	Washington, D.C.	1973
A3	Bonnie Blue Flag	Homestead Records (103)	Washington, D.C.	1973
A4	Carroll County Blues	Homestead Records (103)	Washington, D.C.	1973
A5	Monkey In The Dog Cart	Homestead Records (103)	Washington, D.C.	1973
A6	Drafting Blues	Homestead Records (103)	Washington, D.C.	1973
A7	Mississippi Sawyer	Homestead Records (103)	Washington, D.C.	1973
B1	Cripple Coon	Homestead Records (103)	Washington, D.C.	1973
B2	Rattlesnake Daddy	Homestead Records (103)	Washington, D.C.	1973
B3	Old Hen Cackled	Homestead Records (103)	Washington, D.C.	1973
B4	Tupelo Blues	Homestead Records (103)	Washington, D.C.	1973
B5	Charleston No. 2	Homestead Records (103)	Washington, D.C.	1973
B6	Pallet On The Floor	Homestead Records (103)	Washington, D.C.	1973
B7	Indian War Whoop	Homestead Records (103)	Washington, D.C.	1973
