= Indian War Whoop =

Studio album by the Holy Modal Rounders
- Released: 1967
- Genre: Psychedelic folk
- Length: 33:10
- Labels: ESP Disk (original release); Don Giovanni (reissue)
- Producer: Dr. Jackson Illusion

The Holy Modal Rounders chronology
The Holy Modal Rounders 2 (1965)	Indian War Whoop (1967)	The Moray Eels Eat The Holy Modal Rounders (1968)

Indian War Whoop is the third studio album by the Holy Modal Rounders, released in 1967 through ESP-Disk. The album is the band's first with contributions outside of the original members Peter Stampfel and Steve Weber. The title track is a cover of a song by Hoyt Ming featured on Harry Smith's Anthology of American Folk Music.

== Background ==
Peter Stampfel and Steve Weber, the original members of the Holy Modal Rounders, had joined the influential underground rock band the Fugs in 1965. When Stampfel grew frustrated with working with Weber in July, he quit both bands. Stampfel subsequently formed a rock band, the Moray Eels, with his girlfriend Antonia Duren and drummer Sam Shepard (who was already a noted playwright).

In 1967, despite the fact the Rounders were broken up, Bernard Stollman of ESP-Disk approached the duo to record an album for his label. Stampfel was reluctant to reunite with Weber, noting to Stollman that the reason he quit playing with Weber was because Weber had refused to rehearse new songs. However, he agreed to the proposal under the condition Stollman would help enforce rehearsals before recording.

== Recording ==
Despite Stampfel's warning of Weber's reluctance to rehearse without enforcement, the band ultimately entered the studio in June 1967 without having played together in about two years and without an idea of what they would record. Stampfel and Weber recorded the album with the help of Sam Shepard on drums and Lee Crabtree, previously of the Fugs, on keyboards. In addition to the band not having rehearsed, Stampfel later noted that the sessions were further hindered by his and Weber's use of amphetamines throughout the recording process. These factors led Stampfel to have a negative view of the completed album.

Two of the songs on the completed album were covers of songs by Michael Hurley, who was a longtime friend of Steve Weber and later collaborated with Stampfel on Have Moicy!.

== Reception ==
Professional ratings
Review scores
Source	Rating
AllMusic	4.5/5 stars
Rolling Stone	3/5 stars

Mark Deming of AllMusic retrospectively noted in comparison to the duo's first two albums that "Indian War Whoop is a thoroughly bizarre listening experience" with "neo-psychedelic fiddle-and-guitar freakouts and free-form (and often radically altered) interpretations of traditional folk tunes." He concluded that "its buoyant good humor and chemically-altered enthusiasm remains effective, even when the Rounders' reckless pursuit of inner space sounds like it was more fun to create than to observe on record."

Richie Unterberger, on the other hand, had reservations about the album. Writing the liner notes for the reissue of the band's fourth album The Moray Eels Eat the Holy Modal Rounders, Unterberger noted that the Indian War Whoop "bled over from freaky folk-rock to an almost unlistenable racket, not helped by the shortage of solid songs and arrangements."

== Track listing ==
Jimmy and Crash Survey the Universe
No.	Title	Writer(s)	Length
1.	"Indian War Whoop"	Traditional	3:40
2.	"Sweet Apple Cider"	Traditional	3:08
3.	"Soldier's Joy"	Traditional	2:49
4.	"Cocaine Blues"	Luke Jordan	2:44
5.	"Sky Divers"	Weber	5:03

The Second-Hand Watch
No.	Title	Writer(s)	Length
1.	"Radar Blues"	Michael Hurley	6:33
2.	"The I.W.W. Song"	Stampfel, Weber	4:07
3.	"Football Blues"	Antonia Duren, Stampfel	1:45
4.	"Bay Rum Blues"	Traditional	2:16
5.	"Morning Glory"	Hurley	0:38

== Personnel ==
The Holy Modal Rounders

- Peter Stampfel – fiddle, banjo, electric fiddle, violin, vocals
- Steve Weber – guitar, vocals

Additional musicians and production

- Dick Alderham – engineering
- Antonia, Barbara & Wendy – vocals
- Miles Bachman – design
- Howard "Howie" Bernstein – illustration
- Ken Crabtree – keyboards
- Lee Crabtree – piano, organ
- David Gahr – photography
- Dr. Jackson Illusion – production
- Michael Sanzone – design
- Sam Shepard – drums
