= The Fairfield Four =

American gospel vocal group

- Origin: Nashville, Tennessee, U.S.
- Genres: A cappella, gospel
- Years active: 1921–1960, 1980–present
- Members: Levert Allison (lead vocals, 2000-present); Larrice Byrd, Sr. (baritone vocals, 2000-present); Joseph Thompson (bass vocals, 2012-present); Bobbye Sherrell (tenor vocals, 2014-present)
- Past members: John Battle (lead tenor vocals, 1921-47); Harold Caruthers (baritone vocals, bass vocals, piano, 1921-46); Rufus Caruthers (bass vocals, baritone vocals, 1921-44, 1946-48); Lattimer Green (tenor vocals, 1925-28); James Dotson (tenor vocals, 1928-30); William Malone (tenor vocals, 1930-35); Nathaniel Irvin (tenor vocals, 1935-40); Sam McCrary (lead vocals, 1935-54, 1958-60, 1980-88); George Gracey (tenor vocals, 1941-46); Willie Frank Lewis (bass vocals, baritone vocals, 1944-53); James Hill (baritone vocals, 1946-49, 1980-2000); Isaac Freeman (bass vocals, 1948-49, 1980-2012); Preston York (tenor vocals, 1949-54); Edward 'Preacher' Thomas (lead tenor vocals, 1949); Willie Love (lead tenor vocals, 1950-82); Clarence "Baby" Brooks (baritone vocals, 1950-54), George McCurn (bass vocals, 1950-54); Willmer M. 'Little Axe' Broadnax (lead vocals, baritone vocals, 1953-54); Thomas Huggins (baritone vocals, 1955-59); Ben Vaughn (bass vocals, 1955-59); Clarence Mills (lead vocals, 1958-60); Joe Henderson (bass vocals, guitar, 1958-60); Huey Brown (vocals, 1958-60); David Aron (vocals, 1958-60); Roscoe Robinson (vocals, 1958-60); Willis Williams (vocals, 1958-60); Joe Whitaker (guitar, 1980-82); Willie 'Preacher' Richardson (lead tenor vocals, 1982-95); Wilson 'Lit' Waters (tenor vocals, 1982-95); Robert Hamlett (tenor vocals, 1984-90, 1995-2014); Walter Settles (lead vocals, 1991-99); Joseph Rice (lead tenor vocals, 1995-2014); Edward Hall (tenor vocals, 2012-14)
- Website: thefairfieldfour.com

The Fairfield Four is an American gospel group that has existed for over 100 years, starting as a trio in the Fairfield Baptist Church, Nashville, Tennessee, in 1921. They were designated as National Heritage Fellows in 1989 by the National Endowment for the Arts, which is the United States government's highest honor in the folk and traditional arts. The group won the 1998 Grammy for Best Traditional Soul Gospel Album. As a quintet, they featured briefly in the 2000 movie O Brother, Where Art Thou?.

== History ==
The initial iteration of the group was under the direction of the church's assistant pastor, J. R. Carrethers, and consisted of his sons Rufus and Harold plus their neighbor John Battle. In 1925, the group became a quartet when Lattimer Green joined. During the 1930s, Green left the group and William Malone and Samuel McCrary joined, but they retained the name of Fairfield Four, although it had expanded its membership beyond a quartet. Following their initial radio broadcast on WSIX, the group gained recognition outside of Nashville.

In 1942, the group won a contest that resulted in an appearance on 50,000-watt radio station WLAC, with a hook-up to the CBS network. This performance was so successful that the group continued to perform on WLAC for the next decade, and group members became celebrities within the gospel music genre.

During the 1940s, the membership of the group continued to evolve. Their first recording session was held in 1946 at Nashville's Bullet Records and over the next 15 years, the group released over 100 recordings on the Bullet, Delta, Dot, Champion, and Old Town record labels. By 1949, Sam McCrary assumed leadership of the group and they continued to record and tour with various membership changes. "The group split up in 1950, and Hill, Freeman, and Lewis moved to Greenville, Alabama, where they founded a new quartet, the Skylarks. McCrary, however, kept the Fairfield Four name and added tenors Willie Love and Willie "Little Axe" Broadnax to the group." In 1954, McCrary left the group to become a minister. More personnel changes ensued, but by the late 1950s the group's popularity had waned, along with the decline of interest in a cappella gospel singing. The group disbanded in 1960.

In 1980, the group re-formed to participate in a special "Quartet Reunion" program in Birmingham, Alabama, and they performed again in 1981 at a Smithsonian Institution program on "Black American Quartet Traditions". The revitalized group has continued to perform from the 1980s to the present.

In 1993, the group participated in the Gaither Homecoming video and music recording series. They are featured in Turn Your Radio On and Old Friends.

The group began to gain more popular recognition outside of the gospel world after appearing on albums by other artists, including Steve Earle's 1996 album I Feel Alright, on the song "Valentine's Day", and again the following year on the album El Corazón. The track, "Telephone Road", was released as a single and the group appeared in the music video, as well as select live dates.

Also in 1997, the group appeared on John Fogerty's album Blue Moon Swamp, singing on the track "A Hundred and Ten in the Shade". They also undertook live appearances with Fogerty.

Most significantly, their music was used in the award winning Joel and Ethan Coen film O Brother, Where Art Thou?, its award-winning soundtrack album, and the associated Down from the Mountain film and soundtrack.

In 2003, they performed with Dolly Parton on the song "There Will Be Peace in the Valley for Me" from her album For God and Country. They were later featured on the song "Rock of Ages" by Amy Grant & Vince Gill on Grant's 2005 studio album Rock of Ages... Hymns and Faith.

The Fairfield Four's most recent album Still Rockin' My Soul! was released on March 10, 2015, and won the Best Roots Gospel Album at the 58th Annual Grammy Awards.

== Awards ==
- National Heritage Fellowship, 1989
- Tennessee Lifetime Achievement Award, 1994
- Nashville Music Award Lifetime Achievement Award, 1995
- James Cleveland Stellar Award, 1996
- Grammy Award for Best Traditional Gospel Album, for I Couldn't Hear Nobody Pray, 1997
- Gospel Music Hall of Fame, inducted in 1999
- Grammy Award for Album of the Year, for contribution in O Brother, Where Art Thou? soundtrack, 2002
- Grammy Award for Best Roots Gospel Album, for Still Rockin' My Soul!, 2015
- Barbershop Harmony Society Honorary Lifetime Membership, 2016

== Discography ==
=== Albums ===
- The Bells Are Tolling, Old Town Records (USA, 1962); Ace (UK, 2000)
- The Famous Fairfield Four, Athens (USA, 1973) reissue of 1962 release The Bells Are Tolling
- Revival (USA, 1989); Spring Fed Records (USA, 2012)
- Standing In The Safety Zone, Warner Bros. Records (USA, 1992)
- I Couldn't Hear Nobody Pray, Warner Bros. Records (USA, 1997)
- Wreckin' the House (Live at Mt. Hope), Dead Reckoning Records (USA, 1998)
- Fairfield Four and Friends Live from Mountain Stage, Blue Plate Music (USA, 2000)
- Road to Glory, Fuel 2000 Records (USA, 2004) reissue of 1962 release The Bells Are Tolling
- Still Rockin' My Soul, Fairfield Four Records (USA, 2015)

=== Anthologies ===
- Angels Watching Over Me, Nashboro Records (USA, 1967); AVI Records (USA, 1981); P-Vine Records (Japan, 1991)
- One Religion, Nashboro Records (USA, 1981)
- Standing On The Rock, Ace (UK/Europe, 1993); Nashboro Records (USA 1994)
- Standing In The Safety Zone: 1946-1949, P-Vine Records (Japan, 1999)
- The Best Of The Fairfield Four, Universal (Japan, 2000)
- Don't Let Nobody Turn You Around, Acrobat (UK, 2008)
- The Best Of The Fairfield Four 1946-1953, Acrobat (UK, 2012)
- Joe Henderson featuring The Fairfield Four: Snap Your Fingers, Jasmine Records (UK, 2021)

=== Singles ===
- "Don't Let Nobody Turn You Around/Standing in the Safety Zone", Bullet 284, 1947
- "When I Get Up in Heaven/Amazing Grace", Bullet 292, 1947
- "Tree of Level/Jesus Met the Woman at the Well", Dot, 1949
- "Dear Lord, Look Down Upon Me/Savior Don't Pass Me By", Dot, 1949
- "In the Wilderness/Let Me Tell You About Jesus", Dot, 1949
- "In the Upper Room/I'll Tell the World", Dot, 1950
- "I Don't Know Why I Have to Cry/When I Move in the Room", Dot, 1950
- "Don't Drive Your Children Away/Does Jesus Care", Dot, 1950
- "Nobody to Depend On/Old Time Religion", Dot, 1950
- "No Room at the Inn/Talking About Jesus", Dot, 1950
- "I Love the Name Jesus/Leave Them There", Dot, 1950
- "On My Journey Now/Love Like a River", Dot, 1950
- "Poor Pilgrim of Sorrow/Don't Drive Her Away", Dot, 1950
- "Packing Every Burden/Don't Leave Me", Dot, 1951]
- "My Prayer/Come on to This Altar", Dot, 1951
- "Waiting for Me/Angels Watching", Dot, 1951
- "I'm in Your Care/I Can Tell You the Time", Dot, 1951
- "When We Bow/Let's Go", Dot, 1951
- "Hope to Shout in Glory/All the Way", Dot, 1951
- "I'll Be Satisfied/I've Got Good Religion", Dot, 1951
- "Come Over Here/Who Is That Knocking", Dot, 1953
- "His Eye Is on the Sparrow/Every Day", Dot, 1953
- "How I Got Over/This Evening Our Father", Dot, 1953
- "Stand by Me/Hear Me When I Pray", Dot, 1953
- "When the Battle Is Over/Standing on the Rock", Dot, 1953
- "Somebody Touched Me/Mother Don't Worry", Dot, 1953
- "We Never Grow Old/Jesus in Heaven", Dot, 1954
- "God Knows I'm a Pilgrim/Heaven in My View", Dot, 1954

=== Compilation appearances ===
- "Lonesome Valley" - O Brother, Where Art Thou? (2000)
- "Roll, Jordan, Roll" - Lifted: Songs of the Spirit (2002), Sony/Hear Music
