= I'm Blue, I'm Lonesome =

Song by Bill Monroe
- Released: 1951
- Recorded: February 3, 1950
- Genre: Bluegrass, Country
- Label: Decca
- Songwriter(s): Hank Williams, Bill Monroe

"I'm Blue, I'm Lonesome" is a song by bluegrass icon Bill Monroe. It is the only song credited to Monroe and Hank Williams.

== Background ==
The facts surrounding the authorship of "I'm Blue, I'm Lonesome" remain cloudy. After joining the Grand Ole Opry in 1949, Williams worked several shows with Monroe, whose bluegrass sound was becoming just as popular in the south as the honky tonk music Hank played. According to Colin Escott's book Hank Williams: The Biography, Hank played the song for Monroe somewhere on tour in Texas, and somehow Monroe wound up with a credit:

"There were rumors that the song's notional writer, 'James B. Smith,' was a pseudonym for Hank and Bill Monroe, but it appears as though the royalties went solely to Monroe until Acuff-Rose challenged for a share in the 1990s. Monroe later asserted that he wrote some of the song, but his sideman, Jimmy Martin, who was with Hank and Monroe at the time, insists that Hank wrote it all."

Monroe recorded "I'm Blue, I'm Lonesome" in February 1950 during his first sessions for Decca, and it became a bluegrass classic. Monroe would also cut Hank's "Alabama Waltz."
