= Chris Sharp =

American singer-songwriter

- Birth name: Larry Christopher Sharp
- Born: July 17, 1973 (age 51); Asheville, North Carolina, U.S.
- Genres: Country, folk, bluegrass
- Instruments: Guitar, banjo, violin, piano,
- Years active: 1985–present

Larry Christopher Sharp (born July 17, 1973) is an American musician, guitarist, singer, and record producer who participated in the soundtrack of O Brother, Where Art Thou?. Among other accomplishments, Chris has been nominated twice for a Grammy Award as a guitarist and producer and has won once.

== With John Hartford ==
In 1997, Sharp landed a job touring with John Hartford and played guitar in the style of Lester Flatt in the John Hartford Stringband. This gig enabled Chris to play the Grand Ole Opry at the Ryman Auditorium numerous times. Chris played guitar and sang on John's 1999 album Good Old Boys and John's final album Hamilton Ironworks which was released in 2001. Chris also produced his first solo record Good Fa’air Side which featured musicians such as Earl Scruggs, Kenny Baker, Josh Graves, and John Hartford. During his time with John, Chris participated on the O Brother Where Art Thou? and Down from the Mountain projects; the soundtrack to O Brother Where Art Thou helped Chris to win a Grammy Award. The Down from the Mountain documentary, which was filmed at the Ryman Auditorium, featured Chris playing guitar and singing. Chris was also part of the subsequent Down from the Mountain tour which played such venues as Radio City Music Hall, Constitution Hall, Universal Amphitheatre, and Carnegie Hall.

== Solo career ==
In 2001, after Hartford died, Sharp moved back to North Carolina. Chris joined Bobby Hicks, J.D. Crowe, and others to record on Josh Graves's album Memories of Foggy Mountain. He would later form the Chris Sharp and David Long Band. This group released an album entitled One Hand on the Radio which was described as "something timeless—a record that sounds 50 years old and brand-new at the same time." 2003 saw the release of the Tipton Hill Boys’ album Lucky whose ensemble (featuring drums, pedal steel guitar, and piano in addition to acoustic string instruments) was characterized in No Depression as reminiscent of "1960s Nashville bluegrass." Chris played guitar and sang on Willie Nelson’s 2010 album Country Music and was featured on an episode of Soundstage as part of Willie's band. The ensuing tour allowed Chris to make a return performance at the Ryman Auditorium. Also in 2010, Chris produced and performed on the Grammy-nominated recording Memories of John which reunited the John Hartford Stringband after nearly a decade. This album featured such artists as Tim O’Brien, Bela Fleck, George Buckner, and Alan O’Bryant as well as John Hartford himself (who was present in the form of previously unreleased recordings).

== Discography ==
- Chris Sharp – Good Fa'Air Side – producer, guitar, vocals (special guests include John Hartford and Earl Scruggs)
- The John Hartford Stringband – Good Old Boys – guitar, vocals (Rounder Records)
- John Hartford – Hamilton Ironworks - guitar (Rounder Records)
- A Tribute to John Hartford – Live from Mountain Stage guitar (Blue Plate)
- O Brother Where Art Thou? – guitar, mandolin (soundtrack for the film)
- Down From the Mountain – guitar (film and soundtrack)
- Josh Graves – Memories of Foggy Mountain – guitar (OMS Records)
- Kenny Baker – Spider Bit The Baby – guitar (OMS Records)
- The John Hartford Stringband – Hamilton Ironworks – guitar (Rounder Records)
- The Tipton Hill Boys – Lucky – producer, guitar, vocals -(with George Buckner and Kevin Sluder; Red Clay Records)
- Chris Sharp and David Long – One Hand On The Radio – producer, guitar, vocals (independent release)
- Chris Sharp – Working It Out – producer, guitar, vocals (Red Clay Records)
- The Tipton Hill Boys – Songs We Like – producer, guitar, vocals (with George Buckner and Kevin Sluder; Red Clay Records)
- Willie Nelson – Country Music - guitar, vocals (Rounder Records)
- The John Hartford Stringband – Memories of John – producer, guitar, vocals (Compass Records)
