= Angel Band (song) =

American gospel song

Song
- Published: 1860
- Genre: Gospel music
- Composer: William Bradbury
- Lyricist: Jefferson Hascall

"Angel Band" is an American gospel music song. It reflects on a person who is dying and asks an angel to "bear me away on your snow white wings to my immortal home".

== Historical background ==
The lyrics – a poem written in common metre – were originally titled "My Latest Sun Is Sinking Fast," and were written by Jefferson Hascall (sometimes found as Haskell in hymnals). The lyric was first set in J. W. Dadmun's tunebook The Melodeon in 1860, to a tune by Dadmun. These words, being in common metre, could be sung to many hymn tunes, but the tune now universally associated with them is by William Batchelder Bradbury, and was published in Bradbury's Golden Shower of S.S. Melodies in 1862. Bradbury's song was originally titled "The Land of Beulah." "Angel Band" became widely known in the 19th century, both in folk traditions and in published form, e.g. William Walker's Christian Harmony of 1866, and has been recorded by many artists, probably most famously by the Stanley Brothers, Emmylou Harris, and by the Monkees.

== In popular culture ==
- In 1994 Robert Crumb drew a comic in which an old age cartoonist (portrayed by himself) is carried away by a female angel to the afterlife, accompanied by the refrain from Angel Band.
- The Stanley Brothers version of Angel Band is included on the O Brother, Where Art Thou? soundtrack album (2000) as the end credits song.

Angel Band - Autoharp
A recording of "Angel Band" with vocals; accompaniment on Autoharp
