= O Brother, Where Art Thou? =

2000 film by Ethan and Joel Coen

- Theatrical release poster
- Directed by: Joel Coen (Note: Although the Coen brothers co-directed this film, Joel received sole credit due to Directors Guild of America regulations)
- Written by: Ethan Coen; Joel Coen
- Based on: Odyssey by Homer
- Produced by: Ethan Coen (Note: Although the Coen brothers both produced this film, Ethan received sole credit due to Directors Guild of America regulations)
- Starring: George Clooney; John Turturro; Tim Blake Nelson; Charles Durning; Michael Badalucco; John Goodman; Holly Hunter
- Cinematography: Roger Deakins
- Edited by: Roderick Jaynes (Note: Roderick Jaynes is the shared pseudonym used by the Coen brothers for their editing.); Tricia Cooke
- Music by: T Bone Burnett
- Production companies: Touchstone Pictures; Universal Pictures; StudioCanal; Working Title Films; Blind Bard Pictures
- Distributed by: Buena Vista Pictures Distribution (United States and Canada) (Note: Co-distributed with Universal Pictures in Germany and Italy and Warner Sogefilms in Spain.); Momentum Pictures (United Kingdom) (Note: Co-distributed with Universal Pictures.); BAC Films (France) (Note: Co-distributed with Buena Vista Pictures Distribution.); Universal Pictures (through United International Pictures; International)
- Release dates: May 13, 2000 (Cannes); September 15, 2000 (United Kingdom); December 22, 2000 (United States)
- Running time: 107 minutes
- Countries: United Kingdom; United States; France
- Language: English
- Budget: $26 million
- Box office: $71.9 million

O Brother, Where Art Thou? is a 2000 satirical comedy-drama musical film written, produced, co-edited, and directed by Joel and Ethan Coen. It stars George Clooney, John Turturro, and Tim Blake Nelson, with Charles Durning, Michael Badalucco, John Goodman and Holly Hunter in supporting roles.

It follows three escaped convicts searching for hidden treasure while a sheriff relentlessly pursues them. Its story is a modern satire which, while incorporating social features of the American South, is loosely based on Homer's epic Greek poem the Odyssey. Some examples of this include Sirens, a Cyclops, and the main character's name, "Ulysses", which is the Roman name for "Odysseus". The title of the film is a reference to the 1941 Preston Sturges film Sullivan's Travels, in which the protagonist is a director who wants to film O Brother, Where Art Thou?, a fictitious book about the Great Depression.

Much of the music used in the film is period folk music. The movie was one of the first to extensively use digital color correction to give the film an autumnal sepia-tinted look. It was released by Buena Vista Pictures in North America, while Universal Pictures, through United International Pictures, released it in other countries. The film was met with a positive critical reception; the Coens were nominated for the Academy Award for Best Adapted Screenplay and Deakins for Best Cinematography, while the soundtrack won a Grammy Award for Album of the Year in 2002. The country and folk musicians who were dubbed into the film include John Hartford, Alison Krauss, Dan Tyminski, Emmylou Harris, Gillian Welch, Ralph Stanley, Chris Sharp, and Patty Loveless. They joined to perform the music from the film on the Down from the Mountain concert tour. One of the performances was filmed and released as a documentary.

== Plot ==
In the summer of 1937, three convicts – Pete, Delmar, and Everett – escape from a Mississippi chain gang to retrieve a buried treasure hidden by Everett before the area is flooded to make a lake. The three are assisted by a blind man driving a handcar on a railroad, who prophetically tells them they will find a different fortune than the one they seek. The trio hides first with Pete's cousin, who breaks off their shackles and shelters them, but he reports them to Sheriff Cooley that night, forcing them to flee. Pete and Delmar get baptized in a river the next day, but Everett refuses to join them.

The group then picks up Tommy Johnson, a young Black man who claims that he sold his soul to the devil in exchange for the ability to play the guitar. In need of money, the four stop at a radio station, where they record a rendition of "Man of Constant Sorrow" as the "Soggy Bottom Boys". That night, the trio parts ways with Tommy after their car is discovered by the police. They then briefly fall in with outlaw George "Baby Face" Nelson, who has been robbing banks and killing cows, but after becoming depressed, George gives the trio his cash and walks off. Unbeknownst to the trio, their radio recording becomes a major hit.

Near a river, the group hears singing and finds three women washing clothes. The women give them corn whiskey and they lose consciousness. Upon waking, Pete has vanished, leaving behind his clothes with a toad inside. Delmar is convinced the women were sirens who transformed Pete into a toad, and so takes the toad with them. Everett and Delmar stop for a meal and encounter one-eyed Bible salesman Big Dan, who invites them for a picnic lunch, then mugs the men and kills the toad.

On their way to Everett's hometown, Everett and Delmar glimpse Pete working on a chain gang. They arrive in town in the midst of a campaign rally for Homer Stokes, the challenger in the upcoming gubernatorial election. Everett confronts his wife Penny, who told their daughters that he was hit by a train, then gets into a fight with Vernon, Penny's suitor and Stokes's campaign manager. While recovering at a movie theater, Everett and Delmar encounter a group of prisoners including Pete, who warns them that an ambush has been set up at the treasure site.

That night, Everett and Delmar sneak into Pete's holding cell and free him. Pete confesses that he gave up the treasure's location to the police under torture, but Everett then confesses that, after learning Penny was to remarry, he made up the treasure to convince Pete and Delmar, who were chained to him, to escape with him. Pete, enraged, fights with Everett until the trio stumble into a Ku Klux Klan rally, presided over by Homer Stokes as its Grand Wizard, and find that the Klan has captured Tommy to lynch him. The trio disguise themselves as Klansmen and attempt to rescue Tommy, but they are unmasked by Big Dan. Everett throws a Confederate flag as a distraction while the others cut the supports of a large burning cross, which falls on Big Dan as the others rush Tommy away.

Everett persuades Pete, Delmar, and Tommy to help him win his wife back. Disguised as hillbilly musicians, they sneak into a Stokes campaign gala dinner that she is attending and perform "Man of Constant Sorrow", unaware that the Soggy Bottom Boys are famous. The crowd is electrified, but Stokes recognizes them from the KKK rally and interrupts the performance. When he demands the group be arrested and reveals his white supremacist views, the crowd runs him out of town on a rail. Pappy O'Daniel, the incumbent governor, seizes the opportunity to endorse the Soggy Bottom Boys, grant them full pardons, and hire them as his "brain trust". Penny agrees to remarry Everett as long as he finds her original ring. The group then encounters an exuberant George Nelson as he is paraded through town by a mob on his way to be executed.

The next morning, the group arrives at Everett's cabin in the valley, which Everett had previously claimed was the location of the treasure. They are ambushed by Sheriff Cooley and his deputies, who have been lying in wait. Dismissing their claims that they had received pardons, Cooley orders their hanging. As Everett prays to God, the valley is flooded, (Note: The flood is the result of reservoir construction by the Tennessee Valley Authority.) killing the officers and saving the group, who survive by floating on top of their own coffins. Tommy finds a ring in the flotsam and they return to town, but when Everett presents the ring to Penny, she claims it is not hers and insists that she will not marry Everett without her original ring. As Everett pursues her, the blind handcar driver passes by on the railroad tracks.

== Cast ==
- George Clooney as Ulysses Everett McGill. He corresponds to Odysseus (Ulysses) in the Odyssey. His singing voice is dubbed by Dan Tyminski.
- John Turturro as Pete. Along with Delmar, Pete represents Odysseus's soldiers who travel with him from Troy to Ithaca, seeking to return home. His singing is dubbed by Harley Allen and his yodeling by Pat Enright.
- Tim Blake Nelson as Delmar O'Donnell. Nelson does his own singing on "In the Jailhouse Now", but otherwise his singing is dubbed by Pat Enright.
- Chris Thomas King as Tommy Johnson, a skilled blues musician. He shares his name and story with Tommy Johnson, a blues musician who is said to have sold his soul to the devil at the crossroads (also attributed to Robert Johnson).
- John Goodman as Daniel "Big Dan" Teague, a one-eyed mugger and Ku Klux Klan member who masquerades as a Bible salesman. He corresponds to the cyclops Polyphemus in the Odyssey.
- Holly Hunter as Penny Wharvey-McGill, Everett's ex-wife. She corresponds to Penelope in the Odyssey.
- Charles Durning as Menelaus "Pappy" O'Daniel, the grumpy governor of Mississippi. The character is based on Texas governor W. Lee "Pappy" O'Daniel. He shares a name with Menelaus, an Odyssey character, but corresponds with Zeus from the narrative.
- Daniel von Bargen as Sheriff Cooley, a ruthless rural sheriff who pursues the trio for the duration of the film. He corresponds to both Poseidon in the Odyssey and also possibly the devil. He has been compared to Boss Godfrey in Cool Hand Luke.
- Wayne Duvall as Homer Stokes, a candidate for governor and the leader of a Ku Klux Klan chapter. His singing is dubbed by Ralph Stanley.
- Ray McKinnon as Vernon T. Waldrip. He corresponds to the suitors of Penelope in the Odyssey.
- Frank Collison as Washington Bartholomew "Wash" Hogwallop, Pete's cousin.
- Michael Badalucco as George Nelson, an American bank robber popularly known as "Baby Face".
- Stephen Root as Mr. Lund, a blind radio station manager. He corresponds to Homer.
- Lee Weaver as the Blind Seer, who accurately predicts the outcome of the trio's adventure. He corresponds to Tiresias in the Odyssey. His singing voice is dubbed by Robert Hamlett.
- Mia Tate, Musetta Vander, and Christy Taylor as the three sirens. Their singing voices are dubbed by Emmylou Harris, Alison Krauss, and Gillian Welch.

Gillian Welch and Dan Tyminski also appear as a record store customer and a mandolinist, respectively. Del Pentecost, JR Horne, and Brian Reddy appear as members of Pappy O'Daniel's staff. Ed Gale appears as Homer Stokes's ceremonial "little man". John McConnell cameos as the Woolworth's manager. Royce D. Applegate cameos as a member of Sheriff Cooley's posse. Three members of the Fairfield Four (Isaac Freeman, Wilson Waters Jr, and Robert Hamlett) cameo as gravediggers. The Cox Family and The Whites appear as fictionalized versions of themselves.

== Production ==
The idea of O Brother, Where Art Thou? arose spontaneously. Work on the script began in December 1997, long before the start of production, and it was at least half-written by May 1998. Despite the fact that Ethan Coen described the Odyssey as "one of my favorite storyline schemes", neither of the brothers had read the epic, and they were only familiar with its content through adaptations and numerous references to the Odyssey in popular culture. According to the brothers, Tim Blake Nelson (who has a degree in classics from Brown University) was the only person on the set who had read the Odyssey.

The title of the film is a reference to the 1941 Preston Sturges film Sullivan's Travels, in which the protagonist (a director) wants to direct a film about the Great Depression called O Brother, Where Art Thou? that will be a "commentary on modern conditions, stark realism, and the problems that confront the average man". Lacking any experience in this area, the director sets out on a journey to experience the human suffering of the average man but is sabotaged by his anxious studio. The film has some similarity in tone to Sturges's film, including scenes with prison gangs and a black church choir. The prisoners at the picture show scene is also a direct homage to a nearly identical scene in Sturges's film.

Joel Coen revealed in a 2000 interview that he traveled to Phoenix to offer the lead role to Clooney. Clooney agreed to do the role immediately, without reading the script. He stated that he liked even the Coens' least successful films. Clooney did not immediately understand his character and sent the script to his uncle Jack, who lived in Kentucky, asking him to read the entire script into a tape recorder. Unknown to Clooney, in his recording, Jack, a devout Baptist, omitted all instances of the words "damn" and "hell" from the Coens' script, which only became known to Clooney after the directors pointed this out to him during shooting.

This was the fourth film of the brothers in which John Turturro has starred. Other actors in O Brother, Where Art Thou? who had worked previously with the Coens include John Goodman (three films), Holly Hunter (two), Charles Durning (two) and Michael Badalucco (one).

The Coens used digital color correction to give the film a sepia-tinted look. Joel stated this was because the actual set was "greener than Ireland". Cinematographer Roger Deakins said, "Ethan and Joel favored a dry, dusty Delta look with golden sunsets. They wanted it to look like an old hand-tinted picture, with the intensity of colors dictated by the scene and natural skin tones that were all shades of the rainbow." Initially the crew tried to perform the color correction using a physical process, but after several tries with various chemical processes proved unsatisfactory the process was performed digitally.

This was the fifth film collaboration between the Coen Brothers and Deakins, and it was slated to be shot in Mississippi at a time of year when the foliage, grass, trees, and bushes would be a lush green. It was filmed near locations in Canton, Mississippi, and Florence, South Carolina, in the summer of 1999. After shooting tests, including film bipack and bleach bypass techniques, Deakins suggested digital mastering be used. Deakins spent 11 weeks fine-tuning the look, mainly targeting the greens, making them a burnt yellow and desaturating the overall image in the digital files. This made it the first feature film to be entirely color corrected by digital means, narrowly beating Nick Park's Chicken Run. O Brother, Where Art Thou? was the first time a digital intermediate was used on the entirety of a first-run Hollywood film that otherwise had very few visual effects. The work was done in Los Angeles by Cinesite using a Spirit DataCine for scanning at 2K resolution, a Pandora MegaDef to adjust the color, and a Kodak Lightning II recorder to put out to film.

A major theme of the film is the connection between old-time music and political campaigning in the American South. It makes reference to the traditions, institutions, and campaign practices of bossism and political reform that defined Southern politics in the first half of the 20th century.

The Ku Klux Klan, at the time a political force of white populism, is depicted burning crosses and engaging in ceremonial dance. The character Menelaus "Pappy" O'Daniel, the governor of Mississippi and host of the radio show The Flour Hour, is similar in name and demeanor to W. Lee "Pappy" O'Daniel, one-time Governor of Texas and later U.S. Senator from that state. O'Daniel was in the flour business and used a backing band called the Light Crust Doughboys on his radio show. In one campaign, O'Daniel carried a broom, an oft-used campaign device in the reform era, promising to sweep away patronage and corruption. His theme song had the hook, "Please pass the biscuits, Pappy", emphasizing his connection with flour.

While the film borrows from historical politics, there are clear differences between the characters in the film and historical political figures. The O'Daniel of the movie used "You Are My Sunshine" as his theme song (which was originally recorded by singer and Governor of Louisiana James Houston "Jimmie" Davis), and Homer Stokes, as the challenger to the incumbent O'Daniel, portrays himself as the "reform candidate", using a broom as a prop.

== Music ==
The music was originally conceived as a major component of the film, not merely as a background or a support. Producer and musician T Bone Burnett worked with the Coens while the script was still in its working phases and the soundtrack was recorded before filming commenced.

Much of the music used in the film is period-specific folk music. The selection also includes religious music such Primitive Baptist and traditional African American gospel, most notably the Fairfield Four, an a cappella quartet with a career extending back to 1921. The quartet appears in the soundtrack and as gravediggers towards the film's end. Selected songs in the film reflect the possible spectrum of musical styles typical of the old culture of the American South: gospel, delta blues, country, swing, and bluegrass.

The use of dirges and other macabre songs is a theme that often recurs in Appalachian music ("O Death", "Lonesome Valley", "Angel Band", "I Am Weary") in contrast to bright and cheerful songs ("Keep On the Sunny Side", "In the Highways") in other parts of the film.

The voices of the Soggy Bottom Boys were provided by Dan Tyminski (lead vocal on "Man of Constant Sorrow"), Nashville songwriter Harley Allen, and the Nashville Bluegrass Band's Pat Enright. The three won a CMA Award for Single of the Year and a Grammy Award for Best Country Collaboration with Vocals, both for the song "Man of Constant Sorrow". Tim Blake Nelson sang the lead vocal on "In the Jailhouse Now". During a cast reunion at the 2020 Nashville Film Festival, George Clooney recalled being called into the recording studio and singing despite his lack of talent. It was assumed that he could sing because he was the nephew of Rosemary Clooney. Despite the relation, he could not.

"Man of Constant Sorrow" has five variations: two are used in the film, one in the music video, and two in the soundtrack album. Two of the variations feature the verses being sung back-to-back, and the other three variations feature additional music between each verse. Though the song received little significant radio airplay, it reached #35 on the U.S. Billboard Hot Country Singles & Tracks chart in 2002. The version of "I'll Fly Away" heard in the film is performed not by Krauss and Welch (as it is on the CD and concert tour), but by the Kossoy Sisters with Erik Darling accompanying on long-neck five-string banjo, recorded in 1956 for the album Bowling Green on Tradition Records.

== Release and reception ==
The film premiered at the Cannes Film Festival on May 13, 2000, the United Kingdom on September 15, 2000, and the United States on December 22, 2000. It grossed $71,868,327 worldwide on a $26 million budget.

=== Critical response ===
The review aggregation website Rotten Tomatoes reports that 78% of reviews critics are positive based on 158 reviews with an average rating of 7.3/10. The site's critics consensus reads: "Though not as good as Coen brothers' classics, the delightfully loopy O Brother, Where Art Thou? is still a lot of fun." Metacritic, which assigns a weighted average, gave it a score of 69 out of 100 based on 30 critics, indicating "generally favorable reviews". Audiences polled by CinemaScore gave the film an average grade of "B+" on an A+ to F scale.

Roger Ebert gave two and a half out of four stars to the film, saying all the scenes in the film were "wonderful in their different ways, and yet I left the movie uncertain and unsatisfied".

In 2021, members of Writers Guild of America West (WGAW) and Writers Guild of America, East (WGAE) voted the film's screenplay 99th in WGA's 101 Greatest Screenplays of the 21st Century (so far). In 2025, it ranked number 76 on The New York Times's list of "The 100 Best Movies of the 21st Century" and number 66 on the "Readers' Choice" edition of the list.

=== Accolades ===
The film was selected to be part of the main competition of the 2000 Cannes Film Festival.

Award	Date of ceremony	Category	Recipient(s)	Result	Ref.
Academy Awards	March 25, 2001	Best Adapted Screenplay	Ethan Coen; Joel Coen	Nominated	
Academy Awards	March 25, 2001	Best Cinematography	Roger Deakins	Nominated	
BAFTA Awards	February 25, 2001	Best Screenplay – Original	Ethan Coen; Joel Coen	Nominated	
BAFTA Awards	February 25, 2001	Best Cinematography	Roger Deakins	Nominated	
BAFTA Awards	February 25, 2001	Best Production Design	Dennis Gassner	Nominated	
American Cinema Editors	2001	Best Edited Feature Film – Comedy or Musical	Ethan Coen; Tricia Cooke	Nominated	
American Comedy Awards	2001	Funniest Actor in a Motion Picture (Leading Role)	George Clooney	Nominated	
American Society of Cinematographers	2001	Outstanding Achievement in Cinematography in Theatrical Releases	Roger Deakins	Nominated	
Awards Circuit Community Awards	2000	Best Adapted Screenplay	Ethan Coen; Joel Coen	Nominated	
Awards Circuit Community Awards	2000	Best Cast Ensemble	George Clooney; John Turturro; Tim Blake Nelson; Charles Durning; Michael Badalucco; John Goodman; Holly Hunter	Nominated	
Awards Circuit Community Awards	2000	Best Art Direction	Dennis Gassner	Nominated	
Awards Circuit Community Awards	2000	Best Cinematography	Roger Deakins	Nominated	
Awards Circuit Community Awards	2000	Best Costume Design	Mary Zophres	Nominated	
BMI Film & TV Awards	2002	Special Citation	T Bone Burnett	Won	
British Society of Cinematographers	2001	Best Cinematography	Roger Deakins	Won	
Cannes Film Festival	2000	Palme d'Or	Joel Coen	Nominated	
Chicago Film Critics Association Awards	February 26, 2001	Best Cinematography	Roger Deakins	Nominated	
Chicago Film Critics Association Awards	February 26, 2001	Best Original Score	Carter Burwell; T Bone Burnett	Nominated	
Dallas-Fort Worth Film Critics Association Awards	January 6, 2001	Best Picture	O Brother Where Art Thou?	Nominated	
Dallas-Fort Worth Film Critics Association Awards	January 6, 2001	Best Director	Joel Coen	Nominated	
Empire Awards	February 19, 2001	Best Actor	George Clooney	Nominated	
European Film Awards	December 2, 2000	Screen International Award (USA)	Joel Coen	Nominated	
Florida Film Critics Circle Awards	January 4, 2001	Best Soundtrack and Score	Carter Burwell; T Bone Burnett	Won	
Golden Globes	January 21, 2001	Best Motion Picture – Comedy or Musical	O Brother Where Art Thou?	Nominated	
Golden Globes	January 21, 2001	Best Actor in a Motion Picture – Comedy or Musical	George Clooney	Won	
Grammy Awards	February 27, 2002	Album of the Year	Alison Krauss, Union Station, Tim Blake Nelson, Chris Thomas King, Emmylou Harris, Gillian Welch, Harley Allen, John Hartford, Norman Blake, Pat Enright, Hannah Peasall, Leah Peasall, Sarah Peasall, Ralph Stanley, Sam Bush, Stuart Duncan, The Cox Family, The Fairfield Four, The Whites, T Bone Burnett, Peter K. Kurland, Mike Piersante, Gavin Lurssen, Jerry Douglas, Barry Bales, Ron Block, Dan Tyminski, Cheryl White, and Sharon White	Won	
Grammy Awards	February 27, 2002	Best Compilation Soundtrack Album for Visual Media	T Bone Burnett; Mike Piersante; Peter F. Kurland	Won	
Las Vegas Film Critics Society Awards	December 21, 2000	Best Cinematography	Roger Deakins	Won	
Las Vegas Film Critics Society Awards	December 21, 2000	Best Screenplay, Original	Ethan Coen; Joel Coen	Nominated	
Las Vegas Film Critics Society Awards	December 21, 2000	Best Costume Design	Mary Zophres	Nominated	
London Film Critics' Circle Awards	February 15, 2001	Film of the Year	O Brother Where Art Thou?	Nominated	
London Film Critics' Circle Awards	February 15, 2001	Screenwriter of the Year	Ethan Coen; Joel Coen	Nominated	
MTV Movie + TV Awards	June 2, 2001	Best On-Screen Team (The Soggy Bottom Boys)	George Clooney; Tim Blake Nelson; John Turturro	Nominated	
MTV Movie + TV Awards	June 2, 2001	Best Music Moment	"Man Of Constant Sorrow"	Nominated	
Online Film Critics Society Awards	January 2, 2001	Best Original Score	T Bone Burnett; Carter Burwell	Nominated	
Online Film Critics Society Awards	January 2, 2001	Best Cinematography	Roger Deakins	Nominated	
Phoenix Film Critics Society Awards	2001	Best Original Score	T Bone Burnett; Carter Burwell	Nominated	
Satellite Awards	January 14, 2001	Best Motion Picture, Comedy or Musical	O Brother Where Art Thou?	Nominated	
Satellite Awards	January 14, 2001	Best Screenplay, Adapted	Ethan Coen; Joel Coen	Nominated	
Satellite Awards	January 14, 2001	Best Actor in a Motion Picture, Comedy or Musical	George Clooney	Nominated	
Satellite Awards	January 14, 2001	Best Actor in a Supporting Role, Comedy or Musical	Tim Blake Nelson	Nominated	
Satellite Awards	January 14, 2001	Best Actress in a Supporting Role, Comedy or Musical	Holly Hunter	Nominated	
Science Fiction Fantasy Writers of America	2002	Best Script	Ethan Coen; Joel Coen	Nominated	
Turkish Film Critics Association Awards	2001	Best Foreign Film	O Brother Where Art Thou?	Nominated	

== Soggy Bottom Boys ==
The Soggy Bottom Boys are the fictional musical group that the main characters form as part of the plot; their songs also serve as accompaniment for the film. It has been suggested that the name is in homage to the Foggy Mountain Boys, a bluegrass band led by Lester Flatt and Earl Scruggs. In the film, the actors lip-synched the songs credited to the band, except for Tim Blake Nelson's own voice on "In the Jailhouse Now".

The band's hit single is Dick Burnett's "Man of Constant Sorrow", a song that had enjoyed much success prior to the movie's release. After the film's release, the fictitious band became so popular that the country and folk musicians whose performances are heard on the film embarked on a concert tour called Down from the Mountain, which was filmed for TV and DVD. They included Ralph Stanley, John Hartford, Alison Krauss and Union Station, Emmylou Harris, Gillian Welch, Chris Sharp, Stun Seymour, Dan Tyminski and others.
