= John Hartford discography =

- Studio albums: 35
- Live albums: 3
- Compilation albums: 8
- Singles: 3
- Music videos: 2

== Albums ==
=== Studio albums ===
| Year | Album | US | Label |
|---|---|---|---|
| 1967 | Looks at Life | — | RCA |
| 1967 | Earthwords & Music | — | RCA |
| 1968 | The Love Album | — | RCA |
| 1968 | Housing Project | — | RCA |
| 1968 | Gentle On My Mind and Other Originals | — | RCA |
| 1969 | John Hartford | 137 | RCA |
| 1970 | Iron Mountain Depot | — | RCA |
| 1971 | Aereo-Plain | 193 | Warner Bros. |
| 1972 | Morning Bugle | — | Warner Bros. |
| 1976 | Nobody Knows What You Do | — | Flying Fish |
| 1976 | Mark Twang | — | Flying Fish |
| 1977 | All in the Name of Love | — | Flying Fish |
| 1978 | Headin' Down Into the Mystery Below | — | Flying Fish |
| 1979 | Slumberin' on the Cumberland | — | Flying Fish |
| 1981 | You and Me at Home | — | Flying Fish |
| 1981 | Catalogue | — | Flying Fish |
| 1984 | Gum Tree Canoe | — | Flying Fish |
| 1986 | Annual Waltz | — | Rounder |
| 1989 | Down on the River | — | Flying Fish |
| 1991 | Cadillac Rag | — | Small Dog A-Barkin' |
| 1992 | Goin' Back to Dixie | — | Small Dog A-Barkin' |
| 1994 | The Walls We Bounce Off Of | — | Small Dog A-Barkin' |
| 1996 | No End of Love | — | Small Dog A-Barkin' |
| 1996 | Wild Hog in the Red Brush | — | Rounder |
| 1998 | The Speed of the Old Long Bow | — | Rounder |
| 2001 | Hamilton Ironworks | — | Rounder |
| 2002 | Steam Powered Aereo-Takes | — | Rounder |

=== Collaborations ===
| Year | Album | Label |
|---|---|---|
| 1977 | Glitter Grass from the Nashwood Hollyville Strings (with Doug and Rodney Dillard) | Flying Fish |
| 1981 | Permanent Wave (with Doug and Rodney Dillard) | Flying Fish |
| 1984 | Vassar Clements, John Hartford, Dave Holland (with Vassar Clements and Dave Holland) | Flying Fish |
| 1991 | Hartford & Hartford (with Jamie Hartford) | Flying Fish |
| 1992 | Cadillac Rag (with Mark Howard) | Small Dog A-Barkin' |
| 1995 | The Fun of Open Discussion (with Bob Carlin) | Rounder |
| 1996 | Playtime Songs | Children's Book-of-the-Month Club |
| 1998 | The Bullies Have All Gone to Rest (credited to Jim Wood and John Hartford) | Whipporwill |
| 1999 | Retrograss (with David Grisman and Mike Seeger) | Acoustic Disc |
| 1999 | Good Old Boys (with the Hartford String Band) | Rounder |

=== Live albums ===
| Year | Album | Label |
|---|---|---|
| 1994 | Old Sport | Small Dog A-Barkin' |
| 1995 | Live at College Station Pennsylvania | Small Dog A-Barkin' |
| 2000 | Live from Mountain Stage | Blue Plate Music |

=== Compilation albums ===
| Year | Album | Label |
|---|---|---|
| 1982 | Me Oh My, How the Time Does Fly: A John Hartford Anthology | Flying Fish |
| 1987 | A John Hartford Collection | Flying Fish |
| 2001 | RCA Country Legends: John Hartford | Buddha |
| 2002 | Natural to Be Gone 1967–1970 | Raven Records |
| 2002 | John Hartford/Iron Mountain Depot/Radio John | Camden Deluxe |
| 2002 | Looks at Life/Earthwords & Music | Camden Deluxe |
| 2004 | Love Album/Housing Project | Camden Deluxe |
| 2009 | Good'le Days: Essential Recordings | Rounder |

=== Other appearances ===
| Year | Album | Label |
|---|---|---|
| 1975 | Topanga's Woody Guthrie Folk Festival One | Rounder |
| 1976 | Mark O'Connor: Pickin' in the Wind | Sky Records |
| 1980 | The Great Hudson River Revival, playing Steamboat Whistle Blues | Flying Fish |

== Singles ==
| Year | Single | Chart Positions | | | Album |
| Year | Single | US Country | CAN Country | CAN AC | Album |
|---|---|---|---|---|---|
| 1967 | "Gentle on My Mind" | 60 | — | — | Gentle On My Mind & Other Originals |
| 1969 | "Natural to Be Gone" | — | 26 | 14 | Iron Mountain Depot |
| 1984 | "Piece of My Heart" | 81 | — | — | Gum Tree Canoe |

== Music videos ==
| Year | Video |
|---|---|
| 1967 | "Gentle on my Mind" |
| 1989 | "Piece Of My Heart" |
