= Mike Compton discography =

Mike Compton is an American bluegrass mandolin player. In addition to his solo albums and recordings with the Nashville Bluegrass Band and John Hartford, he has been featured as a performer and collaborator on numerous albums by other artists.

Note: this discography does not include compilations or collections of previously released material.

== Solo ==
- 2005: "Mandotasting" (Cartwright Music)
- 2011: Rotten Taters (self-released)

== Collaborations ==
- 1989: Climbing The Walls (Rounder 0280) with David Grier
- 2006: Stomp (Acoustic Disk B000E8N8OI) with David Long
- 2011: The Gathering (Sycamore Road) with Rhiannon Giddens, Laurelyn Dossett, Joe Newberry, Jason Sypher - mandolin
- 2013: Live: Compton & Newberry (self-released) with Joe Newberry
- 2017: Gallop to Georgia: Mike Compton and Norman Blake Play the Tunes of Narmour & Smith (self-released) with Norman Blake

== As a member of the Nashville Bluegrass Band ==
- 1986: Idle Time (Rounder 0232)
- 1985: My Native Home (Rounder 0212)
- 1987: To Be His Child (Rounder 0242)
- 2004: 20 Year Blues (Sugar Hill SHCD-3959)

== With John Hartford ==
- 1996: Wild Hog in the Red Brush (Rounder 0392)
- 1996: No End of Love (Small Dog A-Barking SD-696CD)
- 1998: The Speed of the Old Long Bow (Rounder 0438)
- 1999: Good Old Boys (Rounder 0462)
- 2001: Hamilton Ironworks (Rounder 0442)
- 2002: Live from Mounta in Stage (Blue Plate SHCD-3959)

== As sideman ==
=== 1977 - 1999 ===
- 1977: Hubert Davis and the Season Travelers - Harvest (RHD) - mandolin
- 1978: Hubert Davis and the Season Travelers - Mixin' It Up (RHD) - mandolin
- 1986: Hazel Dickens - It's Hard To Tell the Singer From the Song (Rounder 0226)
- 1988: Doc Watson - Arthel 'Doc' Watson: Portrait (Sugar Hill) - harmony vocals
- 1988: David Grisman - Home Is Where the Heart Is (Rounder) - mandolin
- 1988: Peter Rowan and the Nashville Bluegrass Band - New Moon Rising (Sugar Hill) - baritone vocals, mandolin, mandola
- 1995: Bill Evans - Native & Fine (Rounder) - mandolin
- 1995: James King - Lonesome and Then Some (Rounder) - mandolin
- 1995: David Grier - Lone Soldier (Rounder)
- 1995: Butch Robbins - Grounded Centered Focused (Hay Holler)
- 1995: Mark Schatz - Brand New Old Tyme Way (Rounder)
- 1996: Chris Jones - Blinded by the Rose (Munich)
- 1996: various artists - True Life Blues: The Songs of Bill Monroe (Sugar Hill) - mandolin
- 1996: Billy and Terry Smith - Bill Monroe Tribute (K-Tel) - mandolin
- 1997: Jimmy Campbell: Pieces Of Time (Red Clay) - mandolin
- 1997: Barry and Holly Tashian - Harmony (Rounder) - mandolin
- 1997: Aubrey Haynie - Doin' My Time (Sugar Hill)
- 1997: David Grier - Panorama (Rounder)
- 1997: various artists - Songs of the Louvin Brothers (Easydisc) - mandolin
- 1999: Chris Jones - Follow Your Heart (Rebel) - Mandolin, tenor guitar

=== 2000 - 2004 ===
- 2000: Matt Combs - Devil's Box (Small Dog A-Barkin') - mandolin
- 2000: The Gibson Brothers - Another Night Of Waiting (Hay Holler) - mandolin
- 2000: Kazuhiro Inaba - Dixie Dream (Copper Creek)
- 2000: Chris Jones - Just A Drifter (Rebel) - mandolin
- 2000: various artists - Christmas Across America: Midwest (Bridge) - mandolin
- 2000: various artists - O Brother, Where Art Thou? (soundtrack) (Lost Highway - mandolin
- 2001: Bill Evans Plays Banjo (Mighty Fine)
- 2001: Keith Little - Distant Land to Roam (Copper Creek) - mandolin
- 2001: various artists - Down from the Mountain (soundtrack) (Lost Highway) - mandolin
- 2001: various artists - Bluegrass Mountain Style (Rounder) - mandolin
- 2001: various artists - A Tribute To John Hartford (Live From Mountain Stage) (Blue Plate) - mandolin
- 2002: Ralph Stanley - Ralph Stanley (Columbia) - mandolin
- 2002: Jimmy Campbell - Young Opry Fiddler (Pinecastle) - mandolin
- 2002: Bluegrass: The Little Grascals: Nashville's Superpickers (Naxos World) - mandolin
- 2002: Nitty Gritty Dirt Band - Will the Circle Be Unbroken, Volume III (Capitol) - mandolin on track 1-12, "I Know What It Means to be Lonesome"
- 2002: various artists - Long Journey Home: Bluegrass Songs of the Stanley Brothers (Rounder) - mandolin
- 2002: various artists - Telluride Bluegrass Festival: Alive at 25 (Planet Bluegrass) - mandolin
- 2003: David Peterson & 1946 - The Howling Blue Winds (Zion Mountain)
- 2003: Joe Isaacs - Dreaming of Home (Music Mill) - mandolin
- 2003: James Monroe - The Way I Am (CBUJ)
- 2003: Patty Loveless - On Your Way Home (Epic)
- 2003: various artists - Cold Mountain (soundtrack) (Columbia) - mandolin
- 2003: various artists - A Very Special Acoustic Christmas (Lost Highway) - mandolin on track 14, "Christmas Time at Home"
- 2003: various artists - Just Because I'm a Woman: Songs of Dolly Parton (Sugar Hill) - mandolin
- 2004: Shawn Camp - Live at the Station Inn (Oh Boy) - mandolin, vocals
- 2004: Bruce Molsky - Contented Must Be (Rounder) - mandolin
- 2004: various artists - Appalachian Picking Society (BMG Heritage) - mandolin

=== 2005 - 2009 ===
- 2005: various artists - Tone Poets (Acoustic Disc) - mandolin on track 5, "Jimmy Fell Off The Wagon"
- 2005: various artists - Flatpicking 1998 (Flatpicking Guitar Magazine) - mandolin
- 2005: The Woodys - Telluride to Tennessee (Rocade) - mandolin
- 2005: various artists - Summertime: A Bluegrass Tribute to Faith Hill (CMH) - mandolin
- 2006: David Peterson - In the Mountaintops to Roam (CD Baby) - mandolin
- 2006: Nashville Chamber Orchestra - Kid Pan Alley (Compass) - mandolin
- 2006: Valerie Smith and Liberty Pike - Wash Away Your Troubles (Bell Buckle) - mandolin
- 2006: various artists - Strummin' with the Devil: The Southern Side of Van Halen (CMH) - mandolin, vocal harmony
- 2007: Tony Trischka - Double Banjo Bluegrass (Rounder) - mandolin
- 2007: various artists - Rush of Life: Pickin' On Gavin DeGraw (CMH) - mandolin
- 2008: Allison Moorer - Mockingbird (New Line) - mandolin
- 2008: Valerie Smith and Becky Buller - Here's A Little Song (2011) - mandolin
- 2009: Elvis Costello - Secret, Profane & Sugarcane (Hear Music) - mandolin
- 2009: various artists - The Road Home: A Tribute to Butch Baldassari (SoundArt)
- 2009: various artists - Pickathon Roots Music Festival: Pickathon 2009 (CD Baby) - track 8, "Smith Chapel" (with David Grier)

=== 2010 - 2011 ===
- 2010: Elvis Costello - National Ransom (Hear Music) - mandolin, harmony vocals
- 2010: Joe Diffie - Homecoming: The Bluegrass Album (Rounder) - mandolin
- 2010: John Hartford Stringband - Memories of John (Compass) - mandolin, harmony vocals
- 2010: Willie Nelson - Country Music (Rounder) - mandolin
- 2010: various artists - Southern Filibuster: The Songs of Tut Taylor (E1 Entertainment / Koch) - mandolin
- 2011: Gregg Allman - Low Country Blues (Rounder) - mandolin, background vocals
- 2011: Jim Lauderdale - Reason and Rhyme: Bluegrass Songs by Robert Hunter & Jim Lauderdale (Sugar Hill) - mandolin
- 2011: Noam Pikelny - Beat the Devil and Carry A Rail (Compass) - mandolin on track 9, "Bob McKinney"
- 2011: Sleepy Man Banjo Boys - America's Music (self-released) - mandolin
- 2011: various artists - T-Bone Burnett Presents The Speaking Clock Revue: Live from the Beacon Theatre (Shout! Factory) - mandolin
- 2011: various artists - Blue Moon of Kentucky: Instrumental Tribute to Bill Monroe (Rural Rhythm) - mandolin

=== 2012 - present ===
- 2012: Lisa Marie Presley - Storm & Grace (XIX) - mandolin
- 2012: Chris Brashear - Heart of the Country (CD Baby) - mandolin
- 2013: Jim Lauderdale - Old Time Angels (Sky Crunch) - mandolin, barritone vocals
- 2013: Mike Scott - Home Sweet Home: Civil War Era Songs (Rural Rhythm) - mandolin
- 2013: Ron Block - Walking Song (Rounder) - mandolin
- 2013: Dailey & Vincent - Brothers of the Highway (Rounder) - mandolin
- 2013: various artists - The Best of WUNC's Back Porch Music, Volume 16 (WUNC)- mandolin
- 2013: various artists - Sucarnochee Revue Presents Music For The New South (Silverwolf) - track 7, "Mississippi Waltz"
- 2014: Tony Trischka - Great Big World (Rounder) - mandolin, background vocals
- 2014: Jessica Stiles - Little Darlin EP (Troubadee)- mandolin
- 2015: Rhiannon Giddens - Tomorrow Is My Turn (Nonesuch) - Mandolin on track 1, "Last Kind Words"
- 2017: Casey Campbell - Mandolin Duets: Volume One (self-released via Bandcamp) - mandolin on track 2, "Monroebillia" and track 12, "White Horse Breakdown"
- 2017: Ralph Stanley - Live At The Bottom Line (June 12th, 2002) (BFD) - mandolin, vocals
