= Billy Joe Shaver discography =

- Studio albums: 17
- Live albums: 8
- Compilation albums: 9
- Singles: 20
- Music videos: 6

This is a detailed discography for American outlaw country music singer Billy Joe Shaver. His first six albums were credited to him under his full name, but starting with 1993's Tramp On Your Street albums were credited to the band Shaver (composed of Billy Joe and his son Eddy Shaver on guitar). Following Eddy's death in 2000 and the release of The Earth Rolls On in 2001, albums were once again credited only to Billy Joe Shaver. In all, this discography comprises 17 studio albums, 8 live albums and 9 compilation albums, with 20 singles released. Billy Joe has appeared on a variety of record labels over the years.

== Studio albums ==
=== 1970s, 1980s and 1990s ===
Title	Album details	Notes
Old Five And Dimers Like Me	Release date: 1973; Label: Monument Records	Debut album, produced by Kris Kristofferson.
When I Get My Wings	Release date: 1976; Label: Capricorn Records	
Gypsy Boy	Release date: 1977; Label: Capricorn Records	
I'm Just An Old Chunk Of Coal... But I'm Gonna Be A Diamond Someday	Release date: April 1981; Label: Columbia Records	
Billy Joe Shaver	Release date: July 1982; Label: Columbia Records	
Salt Of The Earth	Release date: 1987; Label: Columbia Records	
Tramp On Your Street	Release date: August 1993; Label: Praxis Entertainment/Zoo Entertainment/BMG Music	First album credited just to the band "Shaver."
Highway Of Life	Release date: July 1996; Label: Justice Records	
Victory	Release date: July 1998; Label: New West Records	
Electric Shaver	Release date: May 1999; Label: New West Records	
Honky Tonk Heroes	Release date: 1999; Label: Pedernales Records/FreeFalls Entertainment	Contains new recordings of ten Billy Joe Shaver songs, featuring Willie Nelson, Waylon Jennings, and Kris Kristofferson, with Billy Joe and Eddy Shaver. Sessions began in 1989 but remained unreleased for a decade.

=== 2000s and 2010s ===
Title	Album details	Peak chart positions					Notes
Title	Album details	US Country	US	US Heat	US Indie	US Christ	Notes
The Earth Rolls On	Release date: April 2001; Label: New West Records	—	—	—	—	—	Last studio album credited to the band "Shaver."
Freedom's Child	Release date: November 2002; Label: Compadre Records	—	—	—	—	—	First album credited solely to Billy Joe Shaver since 1987's Salt Of The Earth.
Billy And The Kid	Release date: August 2004; Label: Compadre Records	—	—	—	—	—	Contains mostly songs composed by Billy Joe's son Eddy that were completed by Billy Joe after Eddy's death.
The Real Deal	Release date: September 2005; Label: Compadre Records	—	—	—	—	—	Contains a re-recorded version of "Live Forever" featuring Big & Rich, for which a music video was also shot.
Everybody's Brother	Release date: September 2007; Label: Compadre Records	—	—	—	—	50	Gospel album featuring duets with Johnny Cash, Kris Kristofferson, Tanya Tucker, John Anderson, Marty Stuart, Randy Scruggs and Bill Miller.
Long In The Tooth	Release date: August 2014; Label: Lightning Rod Records	19	157	4	23	—	Final studio album released during Billy Joe's lifetime.
"—" denotes releases that did not chart

== Live albums ==
Title	Album details	Notes
Unshaven: Shaver Live At Smith's Olde Bar	Release date: June 1995; Label: Praxis Entertainment/Zoo Entertainment/BMG Music	
Live From Down Under	Release date: 2002; Label: Sphincter Records	A live album featuring both Billy Joe Shaver and Kinky Friedman performing in Australia. Initially released in 2002 and reissued in 2003 as a two disc set. An "abbreviated" single disc version was released in October 2021 by Omnivore Recordings as Live Down Under.
Try And Try Again: Live	Release date: 2003; Label: Compadre Records	Recorded live at the KUT-FM Studios in Austin, TX during summer 2003. Titled as Try And Try Again on the cover, Live: Try And Try Again on the spine, and Try And Try Again: Live on the disc itself.
A Tribute To Billy Joe Shaver: Live	Release date: May 2005; Label: Compadre Records	Contains live performances of Billy Joe Shaver's songs by Billy Joe himself as well as various other artists paying tribute to him for his 65th birthday in August 2004.
Live From Austin, TX	Release date: June 2006; Label: New West Records	Originally recorded and broadcast in 1984 as a part of Austin City Limits. Initially released in a DVD-only iteration in 2006, reissued in a CD/DVD combo pack in 2012.
Storyteller: Live At The Bluebird 1992	Release date: September 2007; Label: Sugar Hill Records	Live acoustic performance featuring Billy Joe and Eddy Shaver that was recorded in January 1992.
Live At Billy Bob's, TX	Release date: July 2012; Label: Smith Music Group	Recorded live at Billy Bob's Texas in September 2011. Contains studio renditions of "Wacko From Waco" and "The Git Go" at the end of the album.
Hurry Up And Wait (Live, Charleston, West Virginia '95)	Release date: November 2020; Label: Fried Bananas	Archival live album recorded by the band "Shaver."

== Compilation albums ==
Title	Album details	Notes
Honky Tonk Heroes	Release date: 1994; Label: Bear Family Records	Contains the entirety of the albums When I Get My Wings and Gypsy Boy on one disc, with three non-album singles included at the end.
Restless Wind: The Legendary Billy Joe Shaver 1973–1987	Release date: October 1995; Label: Razor & Tie	Contains songs culled from Billy Joe's first six studio albums.
Greatest Hits	Release date: January 2007; Label: Compadre Records	Composed of songs recorded by Billy Joe during his tenure at Compadre Records, which includes many live and studio re-recordings of his most famous songs.
The Complete Columbia Recordings	Release date: January 2013; Label: Real Gone Music/Columbia Records	Contains the entirety of the albums I'm An Old Chunk Of Coal, Billy Joe Shaver and Salt Of The Earth, as well as a non-album single from the Billy Joe Shaver sessions.
When I Get My Wings/Gypsy Boy	Release date: April 2013; Label: Raven Records	Contains the entirety of the albums When I Get My Wings and Gypsy Boy with three tracks from the album I'm Just An Old Chunk Of Coal at the end.
Shaver's Jewels: The Best Of Shaver	Release date: November 2013; Label: New West Records	Composed of tracks from the five studio albums recorded by the band "Shaver" between 1993 and 2000.
The Essential Billy Joe Shaver	Release date: October 2015; Label: Columbia/Legacy	
The Collection	Release date: June 2019; Label: Floating World Records	Contains the entirety of Billy Joe's albums Old Five And Dimers Like Me, I'm Just An Old Chunk Of Coal, Billy Joe Shaver and Salt Of The Earth on two discs.
When I Get My Wings/Gypsy Boy	Release date: April 2021; Label: Classics France	Contains the entirety of the albums When I Get My Wings and Gypsy Boy with no extra tracks.

== Singles ==
Year	Title	Peak chart positions		Album
Year	Title	US Country	CAN Country	Album
1970	"Chicken on the Ground"	—	—	—N/a
1973	"I Been to Georgia on a Fast Train"	88	—	Old Five and Dimers Like Me
1973	"Black Rose"	—	—	Old Five and Dimers Like Me
1974	"Lately I Been Leanin' T'ward the Blues"	—	—	—N/a
1976	"America You Are My Woman"	—	—	When I Get My Wings
1977	"You Asked Me To"	80	—	Gypsy Boy
1978	"Billy B Damned"	—	—	Gypsy Boy
1981	"Blue Texas Waltz"	—	—	I'm Just an Old Chunk of Coal (But I'm Gonna Be a Diamond Someday)
1981	"Ragged Old Truck"	—	—	I'm Just an Old Chunk of Coal (But I'm Gonna Be a Diamond Someday)
1981	"When the Word Was Thunderbird"	—	—	I'm Just an Old Chunk of Coal (But I'm Gonna Be a Diamond Someday)
1982	"Ride Me Down Easy"	—	—	Billy Joe Shaver
1982	"Amtrak (And Ain't Coming Back)"	—	—	Billy Joe Shaver
1982	"One Moving Part"	—	—	Billy Joe Shaver
1993	"The Hottest Thing in Town"	—	—	Tramp on Your Street
1993	"Live Forever"	—	96	Tramp on Your Street
1994	"Georgia on a Fast Train"	—	—	Tramp on Your Street
1996	"Comin' On Strong"	—	—	Highway of Life
2002	"Freedom's Child"	—	—	Freedom's Child
2007	"Get Thee Behind Me Satan"	—	—	Everybody's Brother
2011	"Wacko from Waco"	—	—	Live at Billy Bob's Texas
"—" denotes releases that did not chart

== Music videos ==
Year	Video	Director
1993	"The Hottest Thing in Town"	Steve Mims
1993	"Live Forever"	Steve Boyle
1994	"Georgia On a Fast Train"	Chris Rogers
1996	"Comin' On Strong"	
2002	"Freedom's Child"	
2005	"Live Forever"	Rick Schroder
2007	"Get Thee Behind Me Satan"	The Brads
