= Good Old Boys =

Good Old Boys may refer to:

- Good Old Boys (Randy Newman album), 1974
- Good Old Boys (John Hartford album), 1999
- "Theme from The Dukes of Hazzard (Good Ol' Boys)", 1980 single by Waylon Jennings
- The Good Old Boys (film), a 1995 TV movie directed by Tommy Lee Jones
- The Good Ol' Boys, a fictional band featured in 1980 film The Blues Brothers
- Good Ol' Boys, a 1994 album from The Bob & Tom Show

== See also ==
- Old boy network, a kind of interpersonal relationship among friends who do business together
- Viejos amigos, a 2014 Peruvian film sometimes known as Good Old Boys in English
- Country (identity)
