= Jamie Hartford =

- Genres: Bluegrass music Rock music
- Occupation(s): Singer; Guitarist; Songwriter
- Instrument(s): Guitar; Mandolin
- Years active: 1991–present
- Labels: Paladin; Earwave; New Sheriff

Jamie Hartford is an American singer, musician, and songwriter.

== Career ==
Jamie, the son of John Hartford, was raised in a musical environment, meeting and learning from artists such as Johnny Cash, the Everly Brothers, Cowboy Jack Clement, and John Prine. In his early career, Hartford occasionally filled in for Albert Lee at Everly Brothers performances. He also performed with the re-formed Amazing Rhythm Aces. During the mid-90s, Hartford was signed by Asylum Records and recorded an album with producer Pete Anderson. This album was never released. Paladin Records released Hartford's album What About Yes in 1997. He was assisted by Pat McLaughlin (guitar), Jeff "Stick" Davis (bass), and Jim Lauderdale. Hartford paid homage to his father by recording an album with him (Hartford & Hartford) and recorded an album of his father's songs (Part of Your History: The Songs of John Hartford).

The Jamie Hartford Band includes Ray Flacke (guitar), Rick Lonow (drums), Paco Ship (harmonica), and Charlie Chadwick (bass). The late singer-songwriter Guy Clark, who built 19th-century-style flamenco guitars, made a gift of one to Hartford.

== Discography ==
=== Solo albums ===
- 1997: What About Yes (Paladin)
- 2005: Part Of Your History The Songs Of John Hartford (New Sheriff)

=== With the Jamie Hartford Band ===
- 2000: Live (Wildwood)
- 2004: Stuff That Works (Earwave)

=== With John Hartford ===
- 1991: Hartford & Hartford (Flying Fish)

=== As guest musician ===
- 1991: Johnny Cash - The Mystery of Life (Mercury)
- 1996: Laura Boosinger - Sing It Yourself! (Native Ground)
- 1997: RB Morris - ...Take That Ride... (Oh Boy)
- 1998: Laura Boosinger - Down the Road (self-released)
- 1998: Nanci Griffith - Other Voices, Too (A Trip Back to Bountiful) (Elektra)
- 1999: Fergie & The Steelheads - Drive, Drive, Drive (Music Mill)
- 2002: Billy Joe Shaver - Freedom's Child (Compadre)
- 2005: The Peasall Sisters - Home to You (Dualtone)
- 2005: various artists - Walk The Line (Original Motion Picture Soundtrack) (Wind-Up Records)
- 2006. various artists - Voice of the Spirit, Gospel of the South (Dualtone)
- 2007: Billy Joe Shaver - Everybody's Brother (Compadre)
- 2007: John Prine and Mac Wiseman - Standard Songs for Average People (Oh Boy)
- 2007: various artists - Anchored in Love: A Tribute to June Carter Cash (Dualtone)
- 2008: Vince Mira - Cash Cabin Sessions (Lucky Rebel Records)
- 2009: Larry Gatlin & the Gatlin Brothers Band - Pilgrimage (Curb Records)
- 2009: Vince Mira - Vince Mira (Lucky Rebel Records)
- 2010: John Francis - The Better Angels (Dualtone)
- 2010: various artists- Coal Miner's Daughter: A Tribute to Loretta Lynn (Columbia)
- 2010: various artists - Twistable, Turnable Man: A Musical Tribute to the Songs of Shel Silverstein (Sugar Hill)
- 2016: Loretta Lynn - Full Circle (Legacy)
- 2016: Loretta Lynn - White Christmas Blue (Legacy)

=== As Composer ===
- 1999: Jim Lauderdale - Onward Through It All (RCA) - track 12, "What I Want You To Say"
- 2000: Ronnie McCoury - Heartbreak Town (Rounder) - track 3, "Somebody's Gonna Pay"
- 2001: Mike Walker - Mike Walker (DreamWorks SKG) - track 8, "I Want a Little More" (co-written with Don Cook and Mike Walker)
- 2002: Deryl Dodd - Pearl Snaps (Lucky Dog / Epic) - track 6, "Good Things Happen"
- 2002: Andy Griggs - Freedom (RCA) - track 11, "Brand New Something Going On" (co-written with Don Cook)
- 2002: Sawyer Brown - Can You Hear Me Now (Curb) - track 5, "Hard Hard World"
- 2005: Blue Merle - Burning in the Sun (Island Records) - track 10, "Part of Your History" (co-written with Luke Reynolds)
- 2005: Dierks Bentley - Modern Day Drifter (Capitol Records Nashville) - track 6, "Good Things Happen"
- 2006: David St. Romain - DSR (Intuit) - track 1, "Hard, Hard World"
- 2006: various artists - Various – Hands Across The Water (A Benefit For The Children Of The Tsunami) (Compass) - track 11, "Part Of Your History" (co-written with Luke Reynolds)
- 2011: Dierks Bentley - Home (Capitol Records Nashville) - track 9, "When You Gonna Come Around" (co-written with Gary Nicholson)
- 2013: Mickie James - Somebody's Gonna Pay (eOne) - track 1, "Somebody's Gonna Pay"

=== As primary artist/song contributor ===
- 2001: various artists - A Tribute To John Hartford (Live From Mountain Stage) (Blue Plate) - track 5, Who Cut Your Heart Out?
