= David Long (mandolin player) =

American musician (born 1975)

David Long is a mandolin player from Nashville, Tennessee. He was born in the winter of 1975. Long has been described as a next generation musician with traditional sounds of bluegrass. Long's music career started in 1996. He plays Rural Country Blues, Old Time Bluegrass, and Early Black String Band. David’s style of playing was influenced by Curly Seckler. David has played with the Wildwood Valley Boys for about two years, and with Karl Shiflett and his Big Show. He famously used explicit language on the stage of the world famous Station Inn.

== Duet ==
In 2003, David and Mike Compton, a well known mandolin player and Grammy winner, worked as a duet. They met at Mohican Bluegrass Festival in Central Ohio in 1999. Both had an interest in string band music. In 2006, David and Mike recorded an album together titled Stomp. The album was recorded in San Francisco with the help of David Grisman, another mandolin player.

== Songs ==
- "Evening Prayer Blues"
- "Ashland Breakdown"
- "How You Want It Done"
- "Evening Prayers Blues"
- "January Nightmare"
- "Big Indian Blues"
