= Freedom's Child =

Studio album by Billy Joe Shaver
- Released: 2002
- Label: Compadre
- Producer: R.S. Field

Billy Joe Shaver chronology
The Earth Rolls On (2001)	Freedom's Child (2002)	Try and Try Again (2003)

Freedom's Child is an album by the American musician Billy Joe Shaver, released in 2002. Shaver supported the album with a North American tour. It was a hit on Americana radio stations.

Kinky Friedman mentions "Freedom's Child" in his novel Ten Little New Yorkers. Robert Duvall appeared in the video for the song.

== Production ==
Recorded over three days in Nashville, Freedom's Child was produced by R.S. Field. Shaver chose from around 24 songs he had written. Jamie Hartford and Will Kimbrough played guitar on the album. The sound mixed country with blues and rock.

Some versions include an unlisted track, "Necessary Evil", by Shaver's late son, Eddy; it was Shaver's first album without his son since 1987. "Corsicana Daily Sun" and "Day by Day" are autobiographical songs. "That's Why the Man in Black Sings the Blues" is a tribute to Johnny Cash. "Déja Blues" is a duet with Todd Snider. "Magnolia Mother's Love" contains just Shaver's voice and a mandolin. A version of "Good Ol' U.S.A." appeared on Shaver's album Tramp on Your Street.

== Critical reception ==
Professional ratings
Review scores
Source	Rating
AllMusic	3/5 stars
Robert Christgau	(choice cut)
Detroit Free Press	3/4 stars
Orlando Sentinel	4/5 stars
Ottawa Citizen	3.5/5 stars
Philadelphia Daily News	B
Regina Leader-Post	4/5 stars
Uncut	1.5/5 stars
USA Today	3/4 stars

Uncut wrote that Shaver "mixes up gritty, almost Stones-like house-rockers with honky-tonk drinking songs, raw rockabilly romps and loss-tinged acoustic ballads." Robert Christgau praised "That's What She Said Last Night". USA Today concluded that Shaver "writes of patriotism, his heroes and a mother's love without resorting once to a cliche or a rhyme that sounds as if it were used simply to finish a line."

No Depression noted that Shaver "most often delivers his songs in the high and spiritual southeastern tones of Roy Acuff and the Acuff-influenced part of Hank Williams, if in a less dramatic, more laconic way." The Orlando Sentinel stated that the songs "reject glossy studio production to embrace a rambunctious, roadhouse feel." The Washington Post deemed the album "a reflection on a lifetime of hardship and reward, struggle and sweet victory, it is country music clean to the bone at its gritty, thoughtful best."

AllMusic called the album "a fine and moving album from one of country's least-appreciated major talents." The Reno Gazette-Journal listed it as the third best album of 2002.

== Track listing ==
No.	Title	Length
1.	"Hold on to Yours (And I'll Hold on to Mine)"
2.	"Freedom's Child"
3.	"That's Why the Man in Black Sings the Blues"
4.	"Honey Chile"
5.	"Good Ol' U.S.A."
6.	"Day by Day"
7.	"Corsicana Daily Sun"
8.	"That's What She Said Last Night"
9.	"Drinkin' Back"
10.	"We"
11.	"Wild Cow Gravy"
12.	"Déja Blues"
13.	"Magnolia Mother's Love"
14.	"Merry Christmas to You" (Bonus Track)
