= The Fun of Open Discussion =

Studio album by John Hartford, Bob Carlin
- Released: January 17, 1995
- Recorded: February 7–8, 1994
- Genre: Bluegrass
- Length: 53:18
- Label: Rounder
- Producer: Bob Carlin, John Hartford

John Hartford chronology
Old Sport (1994)	The Fun of Open Discussion (1995)	Live at College Station Pennsylvania (1995)

The Fun of Open Discussion is a bluegrass album by American musician John Hartford and Bob Carlin, released in 1995 (see 1995 in music).

As a member of the Hartford String Band, Carlin contributed to a number of Hartford's albums.

The liner notes detail the origin of each song.

Professional ratings
Review scores
Source	Rating
Allmusic	4/5 stars

== Track listing ==
1. "Big John McNeil" (J. Scott Skinner) – 3:07
2. "The Fun of Open Discussion" (John Hartford) – 2:53
3. "Jenny on the Railroad" (Traditional) – 3:22
4. "Hy Patitian" (Traditional) – 2:34
5. "Tishomingo County Blues" (John Hatcher) – 2:11
6. "Lantern in the Ditch" (John Henry Jones) – 3:33
7. "Greenback Dollar " (Traditional) – 4:16
8. "M.I.S.I.P." (Hartford) – 3:17
9. "Doc Chapman's Breakdown" (Owen "Snake" Chapman) – 3:37
10. "Chinquapin" (Carroll Best) – 3:10
11. "Bull at the Wagon" (Denmon Lewis, Dempson Lewis) – 3:01
12. "Mrs. Maxwell" (Turlough O'Carolan) – 3:04
13. "Indian War Whoop" (Hoyt "Floyd" Ming) – 2:45
14. "Shortenin' Bread" (Dock Philipine Roberts) – 5:24
15. "Dry and Dusty" (Traditional) – 3:11
16. "Kitty Puss" (Traditional) – 3:53

== Personnel ==
- John Hartford – vocals, fiddle
- Bob Carlin – banjo
