= Gum Tree Canoe =

Studio album by John Hartford
- Released: 1984
- Genre: Bluegrass
- Label: Flying Fish
- Producer: Jack Clement

John Hartford chronology
Catalogue (1981)	Gum Tree Canoe (1984)	Annual Waltz (1986)

Gum Tree Canoe is an album by the American musician John Hartford, released in 1984. It was reissued on CD in 2001 with two additional tracks.

== Reception ==
Professional ratings
Review scores
Source	Rating
AllMusic	link

In a review for AllMusic, critic Brian Beatty wrote:

Hartford's most even Flying Fish album, with equal measures of songwriting whimsy and expert musicianship, Gum Tree Canoe includes a number of tunes that would remain concert staples for the length of his career... there's not a clinker to be heard. Hartford's banjo playing is exceptional, as is the accompaniment provided by a host of fine country, bluegrass, and new grass pickers... Riverboat tales, an R&B staple, and the Rolling Stones couldn't sound more at home together than they do on this fine album from one of roots music's genuine originals.

John Lupton of Country Standard Time wrote "this is Hartford at his entertaining best, a bittersweet reminder of how much was lost to us when he passed away".

== Track listing ==
1. "I'm Still Here" (John Hartford) – 3:26
2. "Way Down the River Road" (Hartford) – 2:18
3. "Gum Tree Canoe" (S. S. Steele) – 4:07
4. "Your Long Journey" (Doc Watson, Rosa Lee Watson) – 2:27
5. "Jug Harris" (Hartford) – 2:25
6. "Little Piece of My Heart" (Bert Berns, Jerry Ragavoy) – 3:12
7. "Take Me Back to My Mississippi" (John Carso) – 3:53
8. "Lorena" (Joseph Philbrick Webster, Henry DeLafayette Webster) – 4:45
9. "Wrong Road Again" (Allen Reynolds) – 2:48
10. "No Expectations" (Mick Jagger, Keith Richards) – 4:03
  2001 reissue bonus tracks:
11. "You Asked Me To" (Waylon Jennings, Billy Joe Shaver) – 3:48
12. "I Wonder Where You Are Tonight" (Johnny Bond) – 4:13

== Personnel ==
- John Hartford – banjo, guitar, fiddle, plywood, vocals
- Sam Bush – mandolin
- Roy Huskey – bass
- Jack Clement – dobro, guitar, ukulele
- Jerry Douglas – dobro
- Mark Howard – guitar
- Marty Stuart – mandolin
- Kenny Malone – drums, percussion
- Mark O'Connor – fiddle, guitar, mandolin
- Billy Lee Riley – French harp
- Richard Schulman – vocals
- Jeannie Seely – vocals
- Tommy Hannum – vocals

== Production ==
- Produced by Jack Clement
- Richard Adler – remixing
- Bob Carlin – mixing
- Wes Lachot – mixing
- Niles Clement – assistant engineer
- Jim Rooney – assistant engineer
- Dr. Toby Mountain – mastering
