= Vassar Clements, John Hartford, Dave Holland =

Studio album by John Hartford
- Released: 1985
- Recorded: 1984
- Genre: Bluegrass, country
- Label: Rounder
- Producer: Henry Deane

John Hartford chronology
Gum Tree Canoe (1984)	Vassar Clements, John Hartford, Dave Holland (1985)	Annual Waltz (1986)

Vassar Clements, John Hartford, Dave Holland is an album by musicians John Hartford, Vassar Clements, Dave Holland and Mark Howard, released in 1985.

Professional ratings
Review scores
Source	Rating
Allmusic	4/5 stars

== Track listing ==
All music is composed by John Hartford except as noted.

Side one
No.	Title	Writer(s)	Length
1.	"Pea Patch Jig"	Daniel Emmett; Hartford (arr.)	5:05
2.	"You Can't Run Away from Your Feet"		3:30
3.	"Memories of Home"	Dave Holland	3:15
4.	"Home Cooking"	Holland	4:00
5.	"Ten Past Eleven"	Vassar Clements	4:00

Side two
No.	Title	Lyrics	Music	Length
1.	"Scapin' Out on the Roof"			3:26
2.	"Till Something Better Comes Along"	Hartford	Holland	5:50
3.	"You and the Way You Do"			2:54
4.	"Evening Prayer"			3:55
5.	"Illinois River Rag"			2:39

== Personnel ==
- John Hartford – voice, banjo, guitar
- Vassar Clements – violin
- Mark Howard – guitar, mandolin
- Dave Holland – bass

=== Production ===
- Henry Deane – producer
- Rich Adler – engineer
- Dennis Degnan – photographer
- Richard Spencer – cover design
