= Jim Boggio =

American accordionist (1939–1996)

James Robert Boggio
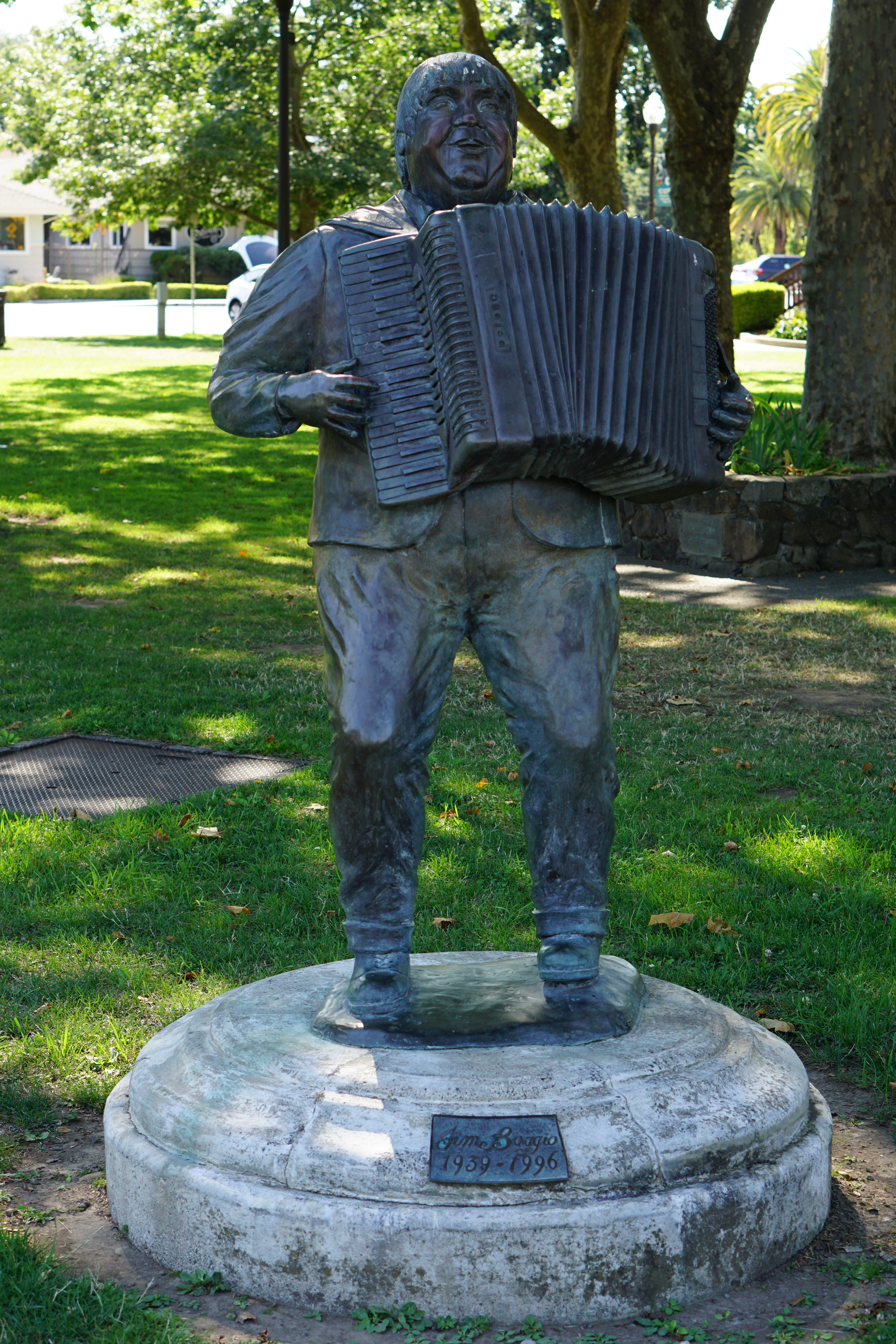
- Statue of Jim Boggio in La Plaza Park

Background information
- Born: December 11, 1939; Illinois
- Died: November 6, 1996 (aged 56) Cotati, California
- Occupation: Musician
- Instruments: Accordion, piano, organ, trumpet

James Robert Boggio (December 11, 1939–November 6, 1996) was an American accordionist. He died of heart failure in Cotati, California, aged 56. A statue of him stands in La Plaza Park, near the center of Cotati.

== Career ==
Boggio's professional music career began with Frankie Yankovic. He studied music at San Francisco State University. Jim and his then wife Judy created a lounge act called The Fiascos in the 1960s. They recorded one album: Live at the Sahara Tahoe. From 1991 to 1996, he organized the Cotati Accordion Festival. He had a Zydeco/swamp boogie band called the Sonoma Swampdogs and owned a music store called Cotati Accordions.

== See also ==
- Dawg Duos
- Dan Hicks (singer)
