= Live from Mountain Stage (John Hartford recording) =

Live album by John Hartford
- Released: May 7, 2000
- Recorded: March 17, 1994 – May 19, 1996
- Genre: Bluegrass
- Length: 40:35
- Label: Blue Plate
- Producer: Larry Groce

John Hartford chronology
Good Old Boys (1999)	Live from Mountain Stage (2000)	Hamilton Ironworks (2001)

Live from Mountain Stage is a live album by John Hartford, released in 2000 by Blue Plate Music. It was recorded March 17, 1994 – May 19, 1996.

Professional ratings
Review scores
Source	Rating
Allmusic	4/5 stars

== Track listing ==
All songs by John Hartford unless otherwise noted.

1. "I Wish We Had Our Time Again" – 2:47
2. "Lorena" (Joseph Philbrick Webster, Henry DeLafayette Webster) – 3:56
3. "More Big Bull Fiddle Fun" – 3:26
4. "Fiddle Tune" – 2:01
5. "Bring Your Clothes Back Home and Try Me One More Time" – 2:46
6. "Gum Tree Canoe" (S. S. Steele) – 2:59
7. "Gentle on My Mind" – 3:07
8. "Yellow Barber" (Buddy Thomas) – 1:40
9. "My Tears Don't Show" (Carl Butler) – 3:11
10. "I Wonder Where You Are Tonight" (Johnny Bond) – 3:29
11. "Where Does an Old Time River Man Go" – 4:21
12. "Catletsburg" (Ed Haley) – 2:08
13. "The Annual Waltz" – 4:44

== Personnel ==
- John Hartford - vocals, fiddle, banjo
- Steve Hill - bass
- Julie Adams - vocals
- Mike Compton - mandolin
- Michael Lipton - guitar
- Ron Sowell - guitar, harmonica
- Bob Thompson - keyboards
- Ammed Solomon - drums, percussion

== Production ==
- Larry Groce - producer
- Scott Robinson - engineer
- Richie Collins - mixing
- Erik Wolf - digital mastering, digital engineer
- Angela Haglund - design
- Brian Blauser - photography
- Senor McGuire - photography
