= The Bullies Have All Gone to Rest =

Studio album by John Hartford, Jim Wood
- Released: 1998
- Recorded: 1997
- Genre: Bluegrass, old-time music
- Label: Whippoorwill

John Hartford, Jim Wood chronology
Wild Hog in the Red Brush (1996)	The Bullies Have All Gone to Rest (1998)	The Speed of the Old Long Bow (1998)

The Bullies Have All Gone to Rest is a bluegrass and old-time music album by John Hartford and Jim Wood, released in 1998.

== Reception ==
Professional ratings
Review scores
Source	Rating
Allmusic	3/5 stars

Writing for AllMusic, critic Brian Bailey wrote "This modest album is one of several tributes to older musical traditions that Hartford recorded late in his career. Solid if not the best, it remains worth searching out for the opportunity to hear the legend playing his banjo again."

== Track listing ==
1. "Don't You Want to Go to Heaven, Uncle Joe?" – 2:36
2. "The Bullies Have All Gone to Rest" – 2:33
3. "Lafayette" – 2:07
4. "The Cat Came Back" – 2:43
5. "Old Joe" – 2:29
6. "Green Valley Waltz" – 2:09
7. "Jack's Been A-Gettin' There" – 1:54
8. "Old Napper" – 2:45
9. "Beech Bottom" – 1:50
10. "Sleepy Lou" – 1:47
11. "Going Across the Sea" – 2:51
12. "Lady of the Lake" – 1:50
13. "Rattlesnake Bit the Baby" – :26
14. "House of David Blues" – 1:53
15. "Over Yonder" – 2:20
16. "Green Back Dollar" – 2:28
17. "New Five Cents" – 1:53
18. "Possom and Taters" – 1:52
