= Hamilton Ironworks =

Studio album by John Hartford
- Released: September 11, 2001
- Recorded: August 2000
- Genre: Bluegrass
- Label: Rounder
- Producer: Bob Carlin

John Hartford chronology
Live from Mountain Stage (2000)	Hamilton Ironworks (2001)	Steam Powered Aereo-Takes (2002)

Hamilton Ironworks is John Hartford's last album, recorded before his death in 2001. Along with the Hartford Stringband, Hartford interprets 22 traditional fiddle tunes. The title track is a traditional Ozarks tune referring to an old mine in Meramec State Park, Missouri.

== Reception ==
Professional ratings
Review scores
Source	Rating
Allmusic	3/5 stars
Country Standard Time	(no rating)

Writing for Allmusic, critic Jesse Jarnow wrote "There are few concessions given to modernity, and, while bringing his own distinct voice to the tunes, Hartford is clearly aware of the historical stream he occupies, coming off as both a devoted scholar and respectful practitioner." John Lupton of Country Standard Time wrote the album "highlights the fact that he was primarily a fiddler, and a damn good one... while the acceptance of fiddle and banjo music has long been at the mercy of producers with little or no concept of the music's dynamics, Carlin demonstrates exceptionally that in the hands of someone who understands what the music's about, it equals anything Nashville or L.A. has to offer."

== Track listing ==
All tracks are Traditional.

1. "Intro" – :59
2. "Knockin' at Your Door" – 3:40
3. "Woodchopper's Breakdown" – 3:18
4. "Hamilton Ironworks" – 4:01
5. "Jawbone" – 2:11
6. "Politic" * – 3:29
7. "Wooliver's Money Musk" – 3:27
8. "Ragtime Dream" – 4:20
9. "Quail Is a Pretty Bird " – 3:25
10. "Eminence Breakdown" – 3:09
11. "Ragged Bill " – 2:57
12. "Hi Dad in the Morning" – 3:57
13. "Black River" – 3:12
14. "Green Corn" – 2:42
15. "Devil's Hornpipe" – 3:56
16. "Wolves a Howlin'" – 2:23
17. "Fiddler's Hornpipe" – 2:57
18. "White River" – 2:56
19. "Greenback Dollar" – 2:37
20. "Comin' Down from Denver on a Trip to Galway Here and There" – 4:50
21. "Chicken Oh Chicken" – 2:23
22. "Goforth's Dusty Miller" – 3:04
23. "Turkey Buzzard" – 3:28
- The euphemistic title "Politic" is Hartford's playful bow to what he refers to as "political correctness" concerning a certain word from an earlier and more overtly racist era of American history—the tune has traditionally been commonly known as "N****r In The Woodpile," a phrase which originated in the mid-19th century in the context of Southern runaway slaves hiding in freight-wagons loaded with wood in their attempts to flee to the North. The word "politic" is an adjective which means "(of an action) seeming sensible and judicious under the circumstances." In this track, Hartford is heard to half-sing, "'Politic'--now, it's a name so politically incorrect that we can't even explain it in the liner notes... 'Politic'-- perhaps the only way is to come up to me at a show or a festival, and I'll whisper it in your ear..."

== Personnel ==
- John Hartford - fiddle, vocals
- Bob Carlin - banjo
- Mike Compton - mandolin
- Larry Perkins - banjo, bass, fiddle
- Chris Sharp - guitar

== Production ==
- Producer: Bob Carlin
- Recording Engineer and mixing: Wes Lachot
- Mastering: David Glasser
- Design: Joanna Bodenweber
- Liner notes: John Hartford
