= Ed Haley =

James Edward "Ed" Haley
- Also known as: "Blind Ed" Haley
- Born: James Edward Haley; August 16, 1885; Warren, Logan County, West Virginia, United States
- Died: February 3, 1951 (aged 65)
- Genres: Old time
- Occupation: Musician
- Instruments: fiddle, banjo, mandolin, piano
- Years active: 1888 to 1951
- Label: Ed Haley Record Company

James Edward "Ed" Haley (August 16, 1885 – February 3, 1951) was a blind professional American musician and composer best known for his fiddle playing.

== Early life ==
Ed Haley was born on August 16, 1885, on the Trace Fork of Harts Creek in Logan County, West Virginia. At the time of Ed's birth, Upper Hart was known as Warren. Ed's father, Thomas Milton Haley, was a well-known fiddler in the Guyandotte and Big Sandy valleys. His grandfather, Benjamin R. Haley, was an active Unionist in the Big Sandy River Valley during the American Civil War, as well as a fiddler. Ed's mother, Imogene "Emmy" Mullins, was a daughter of Andrew Jackson and Chloe (Gore) Mullins, and descended from "Money Makin' Sol" Mullins, Appalachia's famous counterfeiter. Milt and Imogene married on March 22, 1884, in Logan County. Ed was an only child.

At the age of three years, Ed contracted measles and subsequently lost his eyesight. Local tradition blames his father for his blindness. Reportedly, Milt dipped Ed head-first into ice cold water when he was crying from fever.

In September 1889, as part of the Lincoln County Feud, Milt Haley was accused along with Green McCoy of shooting Al Brumfield and his wife in Harts, Lincoln County, West Virginia. In mid-October 1889, Haley and McCoy were captured in Martin County, Kentucky, returned to West Virginia, and murdered by a lynch mob at Green Shoal on October 24, 1889. Haley's and McCoy's brutal slaying garnered nationwide news coverage.

On October 11, 1891, Ed Haley's mother died. Thereafter, he was raised by his maternal grandfather, Jackson Mullins, and uncle, Peter Mullins, on Trace Fork. In 1898, according to county commission records, he was placed in the care of Harrison Blair, a neighbor.

== Work ==
When Ed was a boy, his maternal uncle Peter Mullins gave him a fiddle. Ed showed great skill with the instrument and traveled throughout the Guyandotte and Big Sandy Valleys as a young man with other local musicians. He was basically gone from Harts Creek by 1910 but returned to visit family and friends for the remainder of his life.

Ed grew up to be a professional fiddler who traveled widely throughout West Virginia, Ohio, eastern Kentucky and southwestern Virginia. He had a huge repertoire of old-time music that included breakdowns, jigs, waltzes and show tunes, which he performed at square dances, fairs, street corners, fiddle contests and courthouse squares.

On July 1, 1918, Ed married Martha Ella Trumbo, a blind piano teacher from Morehead, Kentucky. Her parents had been involved in the Martin-Tolliver Feud in Rowan County, Kentucky. Ella was educated at the Kentucky School for the Blind in Louisville, Kentucky. She played mandolin and accordion with her husband for many years. In 1918, the Haleys lived at 115 East Greenup in Ashland, Kentucky. In 1920, they lived at Frogtown in West Ashland, Kentucky. Later, they raised a family in Catlettsburg, Kentucky. They spent their final years in Ashland.

Ed Haley died of a heart attack on February 3, 1951, at home in Ashland, Kentucky. His wife died in November 1954 in Cleveland, Ohio. Both are buried in Ashland.

== Recognition ==
Ed Haley was one of the best known fiddlers in his region of Appalachia. He traveled frequently and performed in a variety of venues. He played over WLW in Cincinnati and made occasional studio recordings for friends, such as for Doc Holbrook in Greenup, Kentucky. He seldom recorded commercially because he was worried that record companies would take advantage of a blind man. Late in life, he made recordings for the family on a Wilcox-Gay disc-cutting machine brought home from the service by his stepson Ralph. The recordings feature Ed, Ella, Ralph (on guitar) and daughter Mona (vocals). Ralph eventually distributed the recordings among his five siblings. Eventually about a one-half to one-third of those recordings were released to Rounder Records. It is estimated that two thirds of Haley's recordings are still missing, lost, destroyed, or unreleased by family members.

Beginning in 1990, bluegrass and folk musician John Hartford began researching the story of Haley's life and music. Generally, Hartford spent the last years of his life promoting Haley and his significance in the world of music. He learned a number of Haley's tunes and recorded them on the Grammy-nominated albums, Wild Hog in the Red Brush and Speed of the Old Long Bow: A Tribute to Ed Haley. Hartford and Brandon Kirk, a Harts-area historian and genealogist, collaborated on a Haley book project from 1995 until Hartford's death in 2001. In March 2000, Smithsonian magazine featured a story about their research. The Ed Haley manuscript remains unpublished.

In October 2015, Haley was inducted into the West Virginia Music Hall of Fame.

== Releases ==
In 1975, Rounder Records released Parkersburg Landing, a 14-track vinyl LP of Haley's work. In 1997 and 1998, after several years of promotion by John Hartford, Rounder released many of Haley's songs on two double CD sets: "Forked Deer" and "Grey Eagle", which featured expanded annotations by John Hartford and Brandon Kirk. In August 2022, Spring Fed Records released the 7 CD boxed set, Stole From The Throat of a Bird - The Complete Recordings of Ed & Ella Haley. The set included many previously unreleased cuts and features much improved audio quality when compared to the Rounder releases. A 105-page liner note book is included with essays and family photographs.

== Popular culture ==
As part of Poage Landing Days, the City of Ashland, Kentucky, hosts an Ed Haley Memorial Fiddle Contest every year since 1996. In 2000, John Hartford performed Ed Haley's arrangement of Dick Burnett's composition Man of Constant Sorrow for the film O Brother, Where Art Thou?. (Burnett would record Haley's Blackberry Blossom at his 1930 session in Atlanta). Multiple versions of that song likewise appeared on the Grammy-winning soundtrack. In 2014, Brandon Kirk released Blood in West Virginia: Brumfield vs. McCoy (Pelican Publishing Company, Gretna, LA), which features young Ed Haley as a character in the story of the Lincoln County Feud.

Haley's fiddle tunes continue to be highly popular in the contemporary old time music community.

== Bibliography ==
- Neal Walters & Brian Mansfield (ed.) (1998) MusicHound Folk: The Essential Album Guide, p. 339, ISBN 1-57859-037-X
