= The Speed of the Old Long Bow =

Studio album by John Hartford
- Released: May 5, 1998
- Recorded: June 11 – December 1, 1997
- Genre: Bluegrass
- Length: 57:53
- Label: Rounder
- Producer: Bob Carlin

John Hartford chronology
The Bullies Have All Gone to Rest (1998)	The Speed of the Old Long Bow (1998)	Retrograss (1999)

The Speed of the Old Long Bow (or more completely The Speed of the Old Long Bow: A Tribute to Ed Haley) is an album by John Hartford of traditional American fiddle music, released in 1998. It is a tribute to the legendary Kentucky/West Virginia old-time fiddler Blind Ed Haley.

== Reception ==
Professional ratings
Review scores
Source	Rating
Allmusic	3.5/5 stars

In his review for AllMusic, critic Steve Leggett wrote "Hartford quite wisely doesn't try to replicate Haley's takes (Hartford admits in the liner notes that he doesn't play like Haley, but that he enjoys trying), but instead interprets them, and the result is pure loose-jointed fun. Everything here is like a patch in a quilt, and the trademark Hartford wit, joy and energy is everywhere apparent. Highlights include the set opener, "Hell Up Coal Holler," "Bonaparte's Retreat" (which is practically the fiddler's national anthem), and a pair of vocal excursions, "Cattlettsburg" and "Boatmen." Although Long Bow is very much a tribute to Ed Haley, it is also very much a John Hartford album, and Hartford's fans will surely treasure it."

== Track listing ==
All songs written or arranged by Ed Haley.

1. "Hell up Coal Holler" – 3:13
2. "Yellow Barber" – 3:02
3. "Lost Indian" – 4:44
4. "Dunbar" – 4:42
5. "Brushy Fork of John's Creek" – 3:15
6. "Bonaparte's Retreat" – 4:50
7. "Forks of Sandy" – 3:49
8. "Cattlettsburg" – 4:03
9. "Half Past Four" – 4:36
10. "Blackberry Blossom" – 2:42
11. "Pumpkin Ridge" – 4:19
12. "Brownlow's Dream" – 4:24
13. "Rebel Raid" – 3:58
14. "Boatman" – 3:38
15. "Ida Red" – 2:38

== Personnel ==
- John Hartford – fiddle, vocals
- Bob Carlin – banjo
- Mike Compton – mandolin
- Rob Gateley – string bass
- Darrin Vincent – guitar, percussion

== Production notes ==
- Bob Carlin – producer, mixing
- Mark Howard – engineer
- Wes Lachot – engineer, mixing
- John Hartford – art direction, liner notes
- Luanne Price Howard – art direction
- Brandon Kirk – research, liner notes
- Billy Adkins – research
