= Dawg Duos =

Dawg duos

Studio album by David Grisman
- Released: 1999
- Genre: Folk music, jazz, bluegrass
- Label: Acoustic Disc
- Producer: David Grisman

David Grisman chronology
Retrograss (1999)	Dawg duos (1999)	I'm Beginning To See The Light (1999)

Professional ratings
Review scores
Source	Rating
Allmusic	3/5 stars

Dawg Duos is a collaborative bluegrass album by David Grisman and 12 different artists, released in 1999. Each of them performs a duo with Grisman on mandolin or mandola. The instruments are as diverse as drums, accordion, autoharp, besides banjo, guitar, string bass, and violin. . This album can be compared with similar effort by Béla Fleck, Double Time, where Grisman performs duo with Fleck on one of the tracks.

== Track listing ==
1. Mando-Bass boogie Sonata (Grisman) 3:01
2. Clinch Mountain Windmills (Legrand, Stanley) 5:46
3. Mandoharp Fantasy (Grisman) 3:38
4. Buttons and Bows (Evans, Livingston) 5:27
5. Caprice for CM (Grisman) 4:58
6. Trinidadian Rag (Brozman, Grisman) 4:52
7. Anouman (Reinhardt) 7:08
8. John Johanna 2:55
9. Swingin' Sorento 4:23
10. New Delhi Duo (Grisman, Hussain) 9:38
11. Mule Skinner Blues (Christian, Rodgers, Vaughn) 1:44
12. Old Souls (Barrio, Grisman, Lage, Reeves) 8:14

== Personnel ==
- David Grisman - mandolin, mandola (1-12)
- Edgar Meyer - bass (1)
- Béla Fleck - banjo (2)
- Bryan Bowers - autoharp (3)
- Hal Blaine - drums (4)
- Mark O'Connor - violin (5)
- Bob Brozman - national guitar (6)
- Denny Zeitlin - piano (7)
- Mike Seeger - banjo (8)
- Jim Boggio - accordion (9)
- Zakir Hussain - percussion (10)
- Vassar Clements - violin (11)
- Julian Lage - guitar (12)
