= Jim Wood (fiddler) =

American fiddler

- Born: August 28, 1964 (age 61); Nashville, Tennessee
- Occupation(s): Fiddler, music director,
- Instrument: Fiddle

Jim Wood (born August 28, 1964) is an American fiddler and five-time Tennessee State Fiddle Champion.

== Early life and career ==
Wood was born in Nashville, Tennessee, on August 28, 1964, and raised outside Fairview, a little country town twenty-five miles southwest of Nashville. With 160 fiddle and mandolin championships (including fifteen state championships in Tennessee, Kentucky, and Alabama) between the years 1978 and 2001, Wood is one of the most decorated contest fiddlers in history. In addition, seventeen of his students have won either state or national titles, including national champions Mike Snider and Maddie Denton.

Wood worked in the Nashville studio and live music scene until 1999. Wood and his wife, Inge, now reside in Flat Creek, just south of Shelbyville, Tennessee. He is the music director of the Tennessee Fiddle Orchestra and operates the Jim and Inge Wood School of Music. He writes for Strings Magazine, The Devils Box, Acoustic Guitar, and does a regular column for Fiddler Magazine. He has fiddle and guitar instructional videos with Homespun Tapes and the Murphy Method and is featured in six instructional books with String Letter Publishing/Hal Leonard.

Wood owns Pinewood Studio and his studio production credits include national champions Pete Huttlinger and Shane Adkins and international star John Hartford. As a composer, he has completed classical commissions from the Lutheran Church (Trinity Mass), the Murfreesboro Symphony Orchestra, and the Murfreesboro Youth Orchestra.
