= Me Oh My, How the Time Does Fly: A John Hartford Anthology =

Compilation album by John Hartford
- Released: 1987
- Recorded: 1976, 1977, 1978, 1979, 1980, 1981, 1984
- Genre: Bluegrass, country
- Length: 64:47
- Label: Flying Fish
- Producer: John Hartford, Sam Bush, Jack Clement, Michael Melford

John Hartford chronology
Annual Waltz (1986)	Me Oh My, How the Time Does Fly: A John Hartford Anthology (1987)	Down on the River (1989)

Professional ratings
Review scores
Source	Rating
Allmusic	4.5/5 stars

Me Oh My, How the Time Does Fly: A John Hartford Anthology is a compilation album by American musician John Hartford, released on LP and cassette in 1987 (see 1987 in music). It was reissued and remastered on CD in 1994 featuring the track listing below.

== Track listing ==
All songs by John Hartford unless otherwise noted.

1. "Skippin' in the Mississippi Dew" – 2:57
2. "The Julia Belle Swain" – 4:47
3. "Natchez Whistle" – 3:00
4. "I Would Not Be Here" – 1:51
5. "Miss Ferris" – 6:58
6. "Bear Creek Hop" – 1:54
7. "Cukoo's Nest" (Hartford, Traditional) – 3:14
8. "Boogie" – 2:29
9. "Gum Tree Canoe" (S. S. Steele) – 4:05
10. "Slumberin' on the Cumberland" (Hartford, Benny Martin) – 4:44
11. "Gentle on My Mind" – 4:34
12. "In Tall Buildings" – 3:24
13. "Nobody Eats at Linebaugh's Anymore" – 6:21
14. "On Christmas Eve" – 3:13
15. "Way Down the River Road" – 2:16
16. "Let Him Go on, Mama" – 3:47
17. "(Good Old Electric) Washing Machine (Circa. 1943)" – 2:05
18. "I'm Still Here" – 3:08

== Personnel ==
- John Hartford – vocals, banjo, fiddle, guitar
- David Briggs – piano
- Curtis Burch – dobro
- Jerry Douglas – dobro
- Jack Clement – dobro, guitar, ukulele
- Sam Bush – mandolin, guitar, vocals
- Pat Burton – guitar
- Jim Colvard – guitar
- John Cowan – bass, vocals
- Doug Dillard – banjo
- Rodney Dillard – guitar
- Dalton Dillingham – bowed bass
- Buddy Emmons – steel guitar, dobro
- Mark Howard – guitar
- Courtney Johnson – banjo
- Roy Huskey, Jr. – bass
- Larrie Londin – drums
- Kenny Malone – drums, percussion
- Benny Martin – violin, ukulele, vocals
- Mark O'Connor – mandolin, guitar
- Marty Stuart – mandolin
- Hargus "Pig" Robbins – piano
- Henry Strzelecki – bass
- Tommy Hannum – vocals
- Billy Ray Reynolds – vocals
- Mac Wiseman – vocals
- Rick Schulman – vocals
- Jeannie Seely– vocals
- Lisa Silver – vocals
- Diane Tidwell – vocals

== Production notes ==
- John Hartford – producer, arranger
- Jack Clement – producer
- Sam Bush – producer
- Michael Melford – producer
- Richard Adler – engineer
- Jack Grochmal – engineer
- Claude Hill – engineer
- Ernie Winfrey – engineer
- Dolores Wilber – art direction
- Jim McGuire – photography
- J. Seymour Guenther – liner notes
