= Permanent Wave (album) =

Studio album by John Hartford, The Dillards
- Released: 1980
- Genre: Bluegrass
- Label: Flying Fish

John Hartford chronology
You and Me at Home (1980)	Permanent Wave (1980)	Catalogue (1981)

Alternative Cover
- Cover of the reissue

Permanent Wave is an album by American musician John Hartford, Doug Dillard, and Rodney Dillard, released in 1980 (see 1980 in music).

Permanent Wave was reissued on CD in 1992 along with Glitter Grass from the Nashwood Hollyville Strings on the Flying Fish label.

Professional ratings
Review scores
Source	Rating
Allmusic	3/5 stars

== Track listing ==
1. "Break It to Me Gently" (Rodney Dillard) – 3:15
2. "That'll Be the Day" (Jerry Allison, Buddy Holly, Norman Petty) – 2:21
3. "Blue Morning" (R. Dillard) – 2:50
4. "The Same Thing" (Sylvester "Sly Stone" Stewart) – 3:38
5. "Yakety Yak" (Jerry Leiber, Mike Stoller) – 2:38
6. "Something's Wrong" (Gene Clark, Doug Dillard) – 2:47
7. "Boogie on Reggae Woman" (Stevie Wonder) – 5:36
8. "Country Boy Rock & Roll" (Don Reno) – 2:01
9. "No Beer in Heaven" (Traditional) – 3:17

== Personnel ==
- John Hartford – banjo, guitar, fiddle
- Doug Dillard – banjo
- Rodney Dillard – guitar, vocals
- Philip Aaberg – keyboards
- Ginger Blake – vocals
- Laura Creamer – vocals
- Linda Dillard – vocals
- Mac Cridlin – bass
- Amos Garrett – guitar
- Scott Mathews – drums
- Michael Melford – mandolin
- Greg Selker – marimba
