= Steam Powered Aereo-Takes =

Studio album by John Hartford
- Released: 2002
- Recorded: 1971
- Genre: Bluegrass
- Length: 52:01
- Label: Warner Bros./Rounder
- Producer: David Bromberg

John Hartford chronology
Hamilton Ironworks (2001)	Steam Powered Aereo-Takes (2002)

Steam Powered Aereo-Takes is a collection of outtakes, demos and jam-sessions from John Hartford's groundbreaking 1971 album Aereo-Plain, released in 2002. The music is a blend of traditional bluegrass musicianship, and the hippie spirit of the '70s. The other members of the Aereo-Plain Band were Norman Blake, Vassar Clements, Tut Taylor, and Randy Scruggs.

== History ==
Hartford and the members of the Aereo-Plain Band recorded Aereo-Plain, a blend of traditional bluegrass musicianship, and the hippie spirit of the '70s. The album has been called the forerunner of the genre now known as "Newgrass". The recording was done in informal jam sessions that created some 80-plus reels of tape. The tracks featured here are song sketches, outtakes, demos, impromptu jams, and goofing-off. Music critic Zac Johnson wrote that "If the sessions that were used on Aereo-Plain became the Revolver of the progressive bluegrass movement, this disc is more like the White Album or maybe Let It Be."

== Reception ==
Professional ratings
Review scores
Source	Rating
Allmusic	3/5 stars
Country Standard Time	(no rating)

Writing for Allmusic, critic Zac Johnson wrote "The song ideas are there, but they feel looser and more free, with each of the performers playing with ideas and song structures, fiddling with things when they don't work, and milking them when they click." Rick Bell of Country Standard Time wrote "Its historical value can't be denied, yet much of it sounds as fresh and innovative today as it must have 30 years ago. Aereoplane offered up several dandy instrumentals and traditional numbers during their short time together... arguably the best among a career of sometimes offbeat, but never dull music."

== Track listing ==
All tracks composed by John Hartford; except where indicated

1. "Where the Old Red River Flows" (Jimmie Davis) – 3:07
2. "Ruff and Ready" (Tut Taylor) – 1:51
3. "Blame It on Joann" – 3:12
4. "The Vamp from Back in the Goodle Days" – 4:41
5. "Emanuel Cant" – 1:44
6. "Bad Music (Is Better Than No Music at All)" (Tut Taylor) – 4:32
7. "Dig a Hole" (Traditional) – 4:14
8. "Presbyterian Guitar" – 2:03
9. "Strange Old Man" – 1:40
10. "Lady Jane" – 2:43
11. "Oasis" (Tut Taylor) – 3:31
12. "Because of You" – 1:10
13. "Morning Bugle" – 3:28
14. "John Henry" (Traditional) – 1:44
15. "Doin' My Time" (Jimmie Skinner) – 3:06
16. "Keep on Truckin'" – 2:46
17. "Don't Ever Take Your Eyes Off the Game, Babe" – 3:28
18. "Howard Hughes Blues" – 3:01

== Personnel ==
- John Hartford - banjo, guitar, violin, vocals
- Norman Blake - guitar, mandolin, vocals
- Vassar Clements - violin, cello, viola, vocals
- Tut Taylor - dobro, vocals
- Randy Scruggs - bass, vocals

== Production ==
- Producer: David Bromberg
- Recording Engineer: Warren Dewey/Claude Hill
- Mixing: Toby Mountain
- Art Direction: Susan Marsh
- Photography: Peter Amft
- Liner notes: Bob Carlin
