= Hartford & Hartford =

Studio album by John Hartford & Jamie Hartford
- Released: 1991
- Genre: Bluegrass
- Length: 32:48
- Label: Flying Fish
- Producer: John Hartford, Mark Howard

John Hartford & Jamie Hartford chronology
Down on the River (1989)	Hartford & Hartford (1991)	Cadillac Rag (1991)

Hartford & Hartford is a bluegrass album by John Hartford and his son, Jamie Hartford, released in 1991 (see 1991 in music).

Professional ratings
Review scores
Source	Rating
Allmusic	3/5 stars

== Track listing ==
1. "Love Grown Cold" (Johnny Bond) – 2:55
2. "Run Little Rabbit" (David Akeman) – 1:34
3. "Killing Floor" (Howlin' Wolf) – 3:00
4. "When the Roses Bloom in Dixieland" (A. P. Carter) – 4:30
5. "New Love" (John Hartford) – 2:56
6. "Sweet Sunny South" – 4:43
7. "Painful Memories" (Jamie Hartford) – 2:48
8. "Nobody's Darling But Mine" (Jimmie Davis) – 3:14
9. "Put All Your Troubles Away" (John Hartford) – 2:04
10. "I Know You Don't Love Me No More" (John Hartford, Benny Martin, Jeannie Seely) – 3:10
11. "She's Still Gonna Break Your Heart" (Jamie Hartford) – 1:54

== Personnel ==
- John Hartford – fiddle, banjo, vocals
- Jamie Hartford – vocals, mandolin
- Mark Howard – guitar
- Roy Huskey, Jr. – bass
- Kenny Malone – percussion

Production notes:

- Jack Clement – executive producer
- John Hartford – producer, lettering, art direction
- Mark Howard – producer, engineer, mixing
- Dave Ferguson – engineer
- Denny Purcell – mastering
