= Cadillac Rag =

Studio album by John Hartford
- Released: 1991
- Genre: Bluegrass
- Label: Small Dog A-Barkin'

John Hartford chronology
Hartford & Hartford (1991)	Cadillac Rag (1991)	Goin' Back to Dixie (1992)

Cadillac Rag is a bluegrass album by John Hartford and Mark Howard, released in 1991 (see 1991 in music). It is also credited to The Hartford String Band.

== Reception ==
Professional ratings
Review scores
Source	Rating
Allmusic	2.5/5 stars

Music critic Thom Owen, writing for Allmusic, wrote of the album "Occasionally the sleek professional production and studied performances make these traditional songs sound lifeless, which prevents Cadillac Rag from being a truly engagining listen. However, it is an interesting one, particularly if you're interested in studying traditional country from an academic standpoint.."

== Track listing ==
1. "All American Rodeo Reel"
2. "Cadillac Rag"
3. "Time to Get Together"
4. "Old John Hartford's Walkaround"
5. "Alaskan Hornpipe"
6. "Stones River"
7. "Nickajacks Lament"
8. "Rose of Gilroy"
9. "Boy Unloading Crossties"
10. "Fritz Waltz"
