= Catalogue (John Hartford album) =

Studio album by John Hartford
- Released: 1981
- Genre: Bluegrass
- Label: Flying Fish

John Hartford chronology
| Permanent Wave (1980) | Catalogue (1981) | Gum Tree Canoe (1984) |

Professional ratings
Review scores
| Source | Rating |
|---|---|
| Allmusic | 3/5 stars |

Catalogue is an album by American musician John Hartford, released in 1981 (see 1981 in music).

== Track listing ==
1. "Sail Away Ladies"
2. "Up on the Hill"
3. "Good Old Electric Washing Machine (Circa 1943)"
4. "Kiss My Plywood"
5. "I Would Not Be Here"
6. "Natural to Be Gone"
7. "My Face"
8. "Jaw Bone"
9. "California Earthquake"
10. "Simple Thing as Love"
11. "Forty Years a Gambler"
12. "My Rag"
