= Wild Hog in the Red Brush =

Studio album by John Hartford
- Released: 1996
- Genre: Bluegrass, old-time music
- Label: Rounder
- Producer: Bob Carlin, John Hartford

John Hartford chronology
| No End of Love (1996) | Wild Hog in the Red Brush (1996) | The Bullies Have All Gone to Rest (1998) |

Wild Hog in the Red Brush is an old-time music album by John Hartford, released in 1996.

== Reception ==
Professional ratings
Review scores
| Source | Rating |
|---|---|
| Allmusic | 4/5 stars |

Writing for AllMusic, critic Rick Anderson wrote "The whole thing's a hoot and a joy, and is recommended strongly."

== Track listing ==
1. "Squirrel Hunters" (Samuel Bayard) – 2:28
2. "Birdie" (Elmer Bird) – 2:25
3. "Grandmammy Look at Uncle Sam" (Forrester) – 3:06
4. "Old Virginia Reel" (Amyx Stamper) – 2:41
5. "Flannery's Dream" (Ricky Skaggs) – 3:41
6. "Down at the Mouth of Old Stinson" (Wilson Douglas) – 1:58
7. "The Girl With the Blue Dress On" (Bayard) – 2:33
8. "Wild Hog in the Red Brush" (Stamper) – 2:40
9. "Over the Road to Maysville" (J. P. Fraley) – 4:13
10. "Bumblebee in a Jug" (John Harrod, Geo Lee Hawkins) – 2:26
11. "Bostony" (Morris Allen, Harrod) – 2:40
12. "Shelvin' Rock" (Solly Carpenter) – 3:26
13. "Molly Put the Kettle On" (Brad Leftwich) – 1:56
14. "West Fork Gals" (Douglas) – 2:36
15. "Portsmouth Airs" (John Lozier) – 2:23
16. "Coquette" (John Hartford) – 2:09
17. "Jimmy in the Swamp" (R. P. Christenson) – 2:41
18. "Lady of the Lake" (Bayard) – 2:54
19. "Natchez Under the Hill" (Benny Thomasson) – 2:42

== Personnel ==
- John Hartford – fiddle
- Bob Carlin – banjo
- Jerry McCoury – bass
- Ronnie McCoury – guitar
- Mike Compton – mandolin

Production notes:

- Bob Carlin – producer, mastering
- John Hartford – producer, liner notes, art direction
- Mark Howard – engineer
- Hank Tilbury – engineer
- David Glasser – mastering
- Luanne Price Howard – art direction
