= Glitter Grass from the Nashwood Hollyville Strings =

Studio album by John Hartford
- Released: 1977
- Genre: Bluegrass
- Label: Flying Fish
- Producer: Michael Melford

John Hartford chronology
Nobody Knows What You Do (1976)	Glitter Grass from the Nashwood Hollyville Strings (1977)	All in the Name of Love (1977)

Alternative Cover
- Cover of the reissue

Glitter Grass from the Nashwood Hollyville Strings (sometimes called Dillard - Hartford - Dillard) is an album by John Hartford, Doug Dillard, and Rodney Dillard, released in 1977.

Glitter Grass was reissued on CD in 1992 along with Permanent Wave on the Flying Fish label.

Professional ratings
Review scores
Source	Rating
AllMusic	3/5 stars

== Track listing ==
1. "Don't Come Rollin'" (Gene Clark, Doug Dillard, Bernie Leadon) – 2:13
2. "Cross the Border Line" (Daniel Moore) – 2:16
3. "Two Hits and the Joint Turned Brown" (John Hartford) – 3:12
4. "Don't Lead Me On" (Doug Haywood) – 2:48
5. "Bear Creek Hop" (Traditional) – 1:54
6. "No End of Love" (Hartford) – 4:11
7. "Biggest Whatever" (Rodney Dillard, Bill Martin) – 3:18
8. "Lost in a World" (R. Dillard, Linda Dillard) – 3:05
9. "High Dad in the Morning" (Homer Dillard) – 2:45
10. "California is Nicer Than You" (D. Dillard) – 3:23
11. "Artificial Limitations" (R. Dillard) – 2:27
12. "Get No Better" (Hartford) – 3:27

== Personnel ==
- Rodney Dillard – vocals, dobro, guitar
- Doug Dillard – vocals, banjo, guitar
- John Hartford – vocals, banjo, fiddle, guitar
- Sam Bush – mandolin
- Jim Colvard – guitar
- Mac Cridlin – bass
- Linda Dillard – vocals
- Buddy Emmons – dobro, pedal steel guitar, harmony vocals
- Amos Garrett – guitar
- Jeff Gilkenson – harmonica, cello
- Kenny Malone – drums, percussion
- Scott Mathews – drums
- Michael Melford – mandolin, harmony vocals
- Hargus "Pig" Robbins – piano, keyboards
- Greg Selker – marimba
- Philip Aaberg – synthesizer, piano, clavinet
- Samm Bennett – conga
- Henry Strzelecki – bass
- Laura Creamer – vocals
- Ginger Blake – vocals
- Benny Martin – harmony vocals
- Pepper Watkins – harmony vocals

Production notes:

- Michael Melford – producer
- Ernie Winfrey – engineer
- Allen Sudduth – engineer
