= Retrograss =

Studio album by David Grisman, John Hartford, Mike Seeger
- Released: 1999
- Genre: Bluegrass
- Length: 49:24
- Label: Acoustic Disc
- Producers: David Grisman, John Hartford, Mike Seeger

John Hartford chronology
The Speed of the Old Long Bow (1998)	Retrograss (1999)	Good Old Boys (1999)

David Grisman chronology
So What (1998)	Retrograss (1999)	Dawg Duos (1999)

Mike Seeger chronology
Southern Banjo Sounds (1997)	Retrograss (1999)	True Vine (2003)

Retrograss is a bluegrass album by David Grisman, John Hartford and Mike Seeger. It was released on the Acoustic Disc record label in 1999.

For the 2000 Grammy Awards, Retrograss received a nomination for Best Traditional Folk Album .

== Reception ==
Professional ratings
Review scores
Source	Rating
Allmusic	4/5 stars

Writing for Allmusic, critic Brian Kelly wrote "All in all, these live, in-studio recordings are mirthful, rocking chair adaptations of American music history. Seeger and Grisman's honeyed tenors conflict well with Hartford's quirky baritone. There are no breakneck solos, and the whole effort achieves more than the sum of its parts..."

Kevin Oliver of Country Standard Time wrote the "more radical reworkings are balanced out by some less revolutionary, but still intriguing versions of bluegrass tunes - Earl Scruggs, "Flint Hill Special," Jimmy Martin's "My Walking Shoes" and the omnipresent classic, "Uncle Pen." With these more traditional tunes included, what could have been a mere novelty record becomes a fascinating study in the mutability of musical genres from another era."

== Track listing ==
1. "My Walking Shoes" (Jimmy Martin) – 2:49
2. "Hound Dawg" (Jerry Leiber, Mike Stoller) – 2:39
3. "Maggie's Farm" (Bob Dylan) – 2:48
4. "Memphis" (Chuck Berry) – 2:44
5. "Flint Hill Special" (Earl Scruggs) – 2:32
6. "The Old Home Place" (Mitch Jayne, Dean Webb) – 3:02
7. "Uncle Pen" (Bill Monroe) – 3:02
8. "Air Mail Special on the Fly" (Ossie Godson, Leon Rusk) – 2:14
9. "Rocky Top" (Boudleaux Bryant, Felice Bryant) – 3:30
10. "Room at the Stop of the Stair" (Randall Hylton) – 2:14
11. "(Sittin' On) The Dock of the Bay" (Steve Cropper, Otis Redding) – 2:38
12. "Jerusalem Ridge" (Monroe) – 3:39
13. "Windy Mountain" (Curley Ray Cline) – 3:07
14. "Maybellene" (Berry) – 2:40
15. "Blue Ridge Cabin Home" (Louise Certain, Gladys Stacey) – 3:16
16. "Rocky Road Blues" (Monroe) – 3:42
17. "When I'm Sixty-Four" (John Lennon, Paul McCartney) – 7:51

== Personnel ==
- David Grisman – banjo, bass, guitar, mandolin, mandola, vocals, tenor ukulele
- John Hartford – banjo, fiddle, guitar, autoharp, vocals
- Mike Seeger – banjo, fiddle, guitar, harmonica, mandolin, autoharp, Jew's harp, vocals
- Sam Grisman – double bass

== Production notes ==
- Craig Miller – executive producer
- David Dennison – engineer, mixing
- Paul Stubblebine – mastering
- D. Brent Hauseman – design, photography
- Dave Kiphuth – illustrations, drawing
- Andrew Day – photography
- Clarke Prouty – photography
