= Down on the River =

Studio album by John Hartford
- Released: 1989
- Genre: Bluegrass, old-time music
- Label: Flying Fish
- Producer: Jack Clement, John Hartford

John Hartford chronology
Me Oh My, How the Time Does Fly: A John Hartford Anthology (1987)	Down on the River (1989)	Hartford & Hartford (1991)

Down on the River is a bluegrass and old-time music album by John Hartford, released in 1989.

== Reception ==
Professional ratings
Review scores
Source	Rating
AllMusic	3/5 stars

Music critic Thom Owen, writing for AllMusic, wrote of the album "Hartford's approach may be too kitschy for some -- after all, there are several songs driven by calliope -- yet it's a thoroughly entertaining album for listeners that share his obsessions, or at least his fondness for fine, old-timey banjo."

== Track listing ==
All songs by John Hartford.

1. "Here I Am in Love Again" – 2:37
2. "Bring Your Clothes Back Home" – 2:31
3. "I Wish We Had Our Time Again" – 2:54
4. "All I Got Is Gone Away" – 1:49
5. "Delta Queen Waltz" – 3:49
6. "Old Time River Man" – 3:37
7. "Men All Want to Be Hoboes" – 2:38
8. "Right in the Middle (Of Falling in Love)" – 3:13
9. "There'll Never Be Another You" – 2:55
10. "Little Boy" – 2:33
11. "General Jackson" – 1:45

== Personnel ==
- John Hartford – fiddle, banjo, vocals
- Mark Howard – guitar
- Roy Huskey, Jr. – bass
- Holly O'Dell – fiddle, vocals
- Jonathan Yudkin – fiddle, vocals
- Margaret Archer – vocals
- Chris Ballinger – vocals
- Dale Ballinger – vocals
- Benny Martin – vocals
- Curly Seckler – vocals

Production notes:

- Jack Clement – producer
- John Hartford – producer, lettering, art direction
- Roger Jackson – engineer
- Mark Howard – engineer, mixing
- Jim McGuire – photography
