= All in the Name of Love (John Hartford album) =

Studio album by John Hartford
- Released: 1977
- Recorded: April 5 and 6, 1977
- Genre: Bluegrass, country
- Length: 33:48
- Label: Flying Fish
- Producer: Michael Melford

John Hartford chronology
Glitter Grass from the Nashwood Hollyville Strings (1977)	All in the Name of Love (1977)	Headin' Down into the Mystery Below (1978)

Professional ratings
Review scores
Source	Rating
Allmusic	2/5 stars

All in the Name of Love is a bluegrass album by American musician John Hartford, released in December 1977.

== Track listing ==
1. "All in the Name of Love"
2. "Cuckoo's Nest"
3. "In Sara's Eyes"
4. "Gentle on My Mind"
5. "Boogie"
6. "Six O'Clock Train and a Girl With Green Eyes"
7. "Don't Try to Hide the Tears from Me"
8. "Ten Chord Blues"
9. "Dancing in the Bathtub"
10. "Deck Hand's Waltz"
11. "Also Love You for Your Mind"

== Personnel ==
- John Hartford – vocals, banjo, fiddle, guitar
- David Briggs – keyboards
- Sam Bush – mandolin, vocals
- Jim Colvard – guitar
- Buddy Emmons – steel guitar
- Roy Huskey, Jr. – bass
- Larrie Londin – drums
- Kenny Malone – drums
- Benny Martin – violin
- Hargus "Pig" Robbins – piano
- Curly Seckler – vocals
- Henry Strzelecki – bass
