= You and Me at Home =

Studio album by John Hartford
- Released: 1980
- Recorded: December 18 & 19, 1979
- Genre: Bluegrass
- Label: Flying Fish

John Hartford chronology
Slumberin' on the Cumberland (1979)	You and Me at Home (1980)	Permanent Wave (1980)

Professional ratings
Review scores
Source	Rating
AllMusic	3/5 stars
The Rolling Stone Album Guide	2.5/5 stars

You and Me at Home is an album by American musician John Hartford, released in 1980.

== Track listing ==
1. "You and Me at Home"
2. "Tonite We're Gonna Boogie"
3. "Your Stuff"
4. "River of Life"
5. "Ladies Live Such a Long Long Time"
6. "Once You've Had the Best"
7. "Don't Go Away"
8. "I Believe In You"
9. "My Love for You"
10. "Imagination Fired by Books"
11. "You and Me Reprised"

== Personnel ==
- John Hartford – vocals, fiddle
- Buddy Emmons - pedal steel
