= Headin' Down into the Mystery Below =

Headin' Down Into the Mystery Below

Studio album by John Hartford
- Released: 1978
- Genre: Bluegrass
- Length: 35:52
- Label: Flying Fish
- Producer: Michael Melford

John Hartford chronology
All in the Name of Love (1977)	Headin' Down Into the Mystery Below (1978)	Slumberin' on the Cumberland (1979)

Headin' Down Into the Mystery Below is an album by American musician John Hartford, released in 1978. All the songs, written by Hartford, continue to show his love for steamboats and the Mississippi River. It is currently not in print.

Professional ratings
Review scores
Source	Rating
Allmusic	4.5/5 stars

== Track listing ==
All tracks composed by John Hartford

1. "The Mississippi Queen" – 3:30
2. "Mama Plays the Calliope" – 2:45
3. "See the Julia Belle Swain" – 2:30
4. "On Christmas Eve" – 3:20
5. "Natchez Whistle" – 2:55
6. "Kentucky Pool" – 2:30
7. "Miss Ferris" – 7:00
8. "Paducah" – 2:10
9. "Headin' Down into the Mystery" – 5:30
10. "Beatty's Navy" – 1:12
11. "In Plain View of the Town" – 2:30

== Personnel ==
- John Hartford – banjo, guitar, fiddle, plywood, vocals
- Jack Greene – vocals
- Billy Ray Reynolds – vocals
- Jeannie Seely – vocals
- Lisa Silver – vocals
- Diane Tidwell – vocals

== Production ==
- Produced by Michael Melford
- Richard Adler – engineer
