= Slumberin' on the Cumberland =

Studio album by John Hartford
- Released: 1979
- Genre: Bluegrass
- Length: 33:57
- Label: Flying Fish

John Hartford chronology
| Headin' Down into the Mystery Below (1978) | Slumberin' on the Cumberland (1979) | You and Me at Home (1980) |

Slumberin' on the Cumberland is an album by American musician John Hartford, released in 1979 (see 1979 in music).

Professional ratings
Review scores
| Source | Rating |
|---|---|
| Allmusic | 3/5 stars |

== Track listing ==
1. "Slumberin' on the Cumberland" (Hartford-Benny Martin)
2. "Greenback Dollar/Careless Love" (Traditional)
3. "Love in Vain" (Robert Johnson)
4. "If I Can Stay Away Long Enough" (Martin)
5. "Hillman (Martin)
6. "Southern Moon" (Alton Delmore)
7. "I Can Read Between the Lines in Your Letters" (Martin)
8. "Blue Writin' on White Paper (Martin)
9. "First Fall of Snow" (Pat Burton)
10. "Fiddle Faddle" (Burton)
11. "Go Fall Asleep Now" (Hartford)

== Personnel ==
- John Hartford – banjo, guitar, fiddle, plywood, vocals
- Pat Burton – guitar, vocals
- Benny Martin – fiddle, ukulele, vocals
- Buddy Emmons – steel guitar, dobro
- Sam Bush – mandolin
- Roy Huskey, Jr. – double bass
- Henry Strzelecki – electric bass
- Hargus "Pig" Robbins – piano
- Larrie Londin – drums

== Production ==
- Michael Melford – producer
- Richard Adler – recording engineer
