= Goin' Back to Dixie =

Album by John Hartford

Studio album by John Hartford
- Released: 1992
- Genre: Bluegrass
- Label: Small Dog A-Barkin'

John Hartford chronology
Cadillac Rag (1991)	Goin' Back to Dixie (1992)	The Walls We Bounce Off Of (1994)

Goin' Back to Dixie is a bluegrass album by American musician John Hartford, released in 1992 (see 1992 in music).

Professional ratings
Review scores
Source	Rating
Allmusic	3/5 stars

== Track listing ==
1. "Goin' Back To Dixie"
2. "Little Girl With Her Hair All Down Behind"
3. "I Wonder Where You Are Tonight"
4. "Heavenly Sunlight"
5. "M.I.S.I.P."
6. "The Girl I Left Behind"
7. "We Did Our Best"
8. "The Boys From North Carolina" (John Hartford)
9. "Them Way Long Time Ago Times"
10. "The Death Of John Henry"
