= The Walls We Bounce Off Of =

Studio album by John Hartford
- Released: 1994
- Genre: Bluegrass
- Label: Small Dog A-Barkin'

John Hartford chronology
| Goin' Back to Dixie (1992) | The Walls We Bounce Off Of (1994) | Old Sport (1994) |

The Walls We Bounce Off Of is a bluegrass album by American musician John Hartford, released in 1994 (see 1994 in music).

== Reception ==
Professional ratings
Review scores
| Source | Rating |
|---|---|
| Allmusic | 4/5 stars |

Music critic Brian Beatty, writing for Allmusic, wrote of the album "Whatever this relaxed album lacks in comparison to the studio polish of his early RCA recordings or the reverence for older traditions that characterized his Rounder releases, there's no refuting that Hartford's love of music and joy for life permeate these seriously silly songs."

== Track listing ==
All songs by John Hartford.

1. "More Big Bull Fiddle Fun" – 3:43
2. "The Queen of Rock & Roll" – 2:20
3. "Can't Stand to Throw Anything Away" – 3:39
4. "Interstate Waltz" – 2:30
5. "Flea Market Breakdown" – 2:59
6. "Your Tax Dollars at Work" – 2:00
7. "When the Dinner Bell Rings" – 1:32
8. "I Just Wanna Look in There" – 4:52
9. "The All Collision All Explosion Song" – 2:06
10. "Fourteen Pole Cat Skins on a Chevy Camaro" – 2:45
11. "Sexual Harrassment [sic]" – 2:39
12. "Wonder Woman" – 2:21
13. "Hooter Thunkit" – 3:18

== Personnel ==
- John Hartford – vocals, banjo, fiddle, guitar, percussion
