= Nobody Knows What You Do =

Studio album by John Hartford
- Released: 1976
- Recorded: 1975
- Genre: Bluegrass
- Length: 35:30
- Label: Flying Fish
- Producer: Michael Melford

John Hartford chronology
Mark Twang (1976)	Nobody Knows What You Do (1976)	Glitter Grass from the Nashwood Hollyville Strings (1977)

Nobody Knows What You Do is an album by John Hartford, released in 1976.

== Background ==
After recording the minimalist Mark Twang, Hartford returned to the studio with a band. The new material leaned more toward country-rock than bluegrass, which he would continue with 1977's Dillard Hartford Dillard collaboration and All in the Name of Love. The instrumental "John McLaughlin" is a tribute to the jazz/fusion guitarist.

For the CD release (Flying Fish FF70028), the track "Joseph's Dream" has been replaced by a recording of the song "Get No Better", but still labeled "Joseph's Dream." This recording is an alternative version to the one released on the Dillard Hartford Dillard release Glitter-Grass from the Nashwood Hollyville Strings. There has been no definitive explanation for this substitution. Thus, this studio version of "Joseph's Dream" remains unreleased on CD. It was, however, released as a digital download.

== Reception ==
Professional ratings
Review scores
Source	Rating
Allmusic	2/5 stars

Writing for Allmusic, critic Ronnie D. Lankford, Jr. called the album "highly eccentric" and wrote "Hartford's approach on Nobody Knows What You Do is just about as far out as Hartford ever ventured... [it] shouldn't be the first choice for a new Hartford devotee. It may not even appeal to fans of his more recent work. But for those who can't get enough of those heady days of the early- to mid-'70s when an artist could still go into the studio and make an album like this, Nobody Knows What You Do will speak to the inner hippie-hillbilly."

== Track listing ==
All tracks composed by John Hartford; except where indicated

1. "You Don't Have to Do That" – 1:30
2. "Didn't Want to Be Forgotten" – 2:13
3. "In Tall Buildings" – 4:18
4. "John McLaughlin" – 1:35
5. "Granny Wontcha Smoke Some Marijuana" – 1:49
6. "The False Hearted Tenor Waltz" – 2:58
7. "Joseph's Dream" * – 3:57
8. "Down" – 2:00
9. "The Golden Globe Award" – 4:15
10. "Sly Feel" – 4:27
11. "Somewhere, My Love-We'll Meet Again Sweetheart" (Lester Flatt, Maurice Jarre, Earl Scruggs) – 2:35
12. "Nobody Knows What You Do" – 3:53

== Personnel ==
- John Hartford – banjo, guitar, fiddle, vocals, harmony vocals
- Sam Bush – mandolin, vocals, harmony vocals
- David Briggs – piano
- Jim Colvard – guitar
- Dalton Dillingham – bass
- Buddy Emmons – dobro, pedal steel guitar
- Roy M. "Junior" Husky – bass
- Kenny Malone – drums
- Benny Martin – fiddle, guitar, harmony vocals
- Dale Sellers – guitar
- Mac Wiseman – vocals, harmony vocals

== Production ==
- Michael Melford – producer
- Claude Hill – engineer
- John Hartford – liner notes
