= Old Sport =

Live album by John Hartford
- Released: April 25, 1995
- Genre: Bluegrass
- Label: Small Dog A-Barkin'

John Hartford chronology
The Walls We Bounce Off Of (1994)	Old Sport (1995)	The Fun of Open Discussion (1995)

Old Sport is a bluegrass album by American musician John Hartford and Texas Shorty (Jim Chancellor), released in 1995 (see 1995 in music).

== Track listing ==
1. "Miller's Reel"
2. "Liverpool Hornpipe"
3. "Georgia Boys"
4. "Pretty Polly Anna"
5. "Midnight on the Water"
6. "Salt River"
7. "Lady's Fancy"
8. "Old Sport"
9. "Snowbird on the Ash Bank"
10. "Laughing Boy"
11. "Bonapart's Retreat"
12. "Pretty Little Widder"
13. "Jack O' Diamonds"

== Personnel ==
- John Hartford – vocals, banjo, fiddle, guitar
- Texas Shorty (Jim Chancellor) – fiddle
