= Live at College Station Pennsylvania =

Live album by John Hartford
- Released: April 25, 1995
- Genre: Bluegrass
- Label: Small Dog A-Barkin'
- Producer: John Hartford, Mark Howard

John Hartford chronology
The Fun of Open Discussion (1995)	Live at College Station Pennsylvania (1995)	No End of Love (1996)

Live at College Station Pennsylvania is a live album by John Hartford, released in 1995.

== Reception ==
Professional ratings
Review scores
Source	Rating
Allmusic	3/5 stars

Writing for AllMusic, critic Brian Beatty wrote "Whether plucking his banjo, sawing away on his fiddle, or strumming his guitar, Hartford sounds happily at home throughout this entertaining set."

== Track listing ==
All songs by John Hartford unless otherwise noted.

1. "I Wish We Had Our Time Again" – 2:47
2. "Gum Tree Canoe" (S. S. Steele) – 4:03
3. "Gentle on My Mind" – 3:19
4. "In Tall Buildings" – 3:13
5. "Wrong Road Again" (Allen Reynolds) – 2:10
6. "Bring Your Clothes Back Home" – 2:31
7. "Run Little Rabbit" (David Akeman) – 1:41
8. "Lorena" (Joseph Philbrick Webster, Henry DeLafayette Webster) – 4:04
9. "The Girl I Left Behind Me" – 2:42
10. "Learning to Smile All Over Again" – 4:23
11. "Cacklin' Hen" – 2:33
12. "I Would Not Be Here" – 2:15
13. "Boogie" – 3:48
14. "Old River Men" – 5:18
15. "Piece of My Heart" (Jerry Ragovoy, Bert Berns) – 3:33
16. "Natchez Whistle" – 4:22
17. "Julia Belle Swain"
18. "Skippin' in the Mississippi Dew" – 4:11

== Personnel ==
- John Hartford - vocals, fiddle, banjo, guitar

== Production ==
- John Hartford - producer
- Mark Howard - producer, mixing, mastering
- Dan Rudin - mastering
- Tim Wendt - engineer
