= Good Old Boys (John Hartford album) =

Studio album by John Hartford
- Released: September 14, 1999
- Genre: Bluegrass
- Length: 53:06
- Label: Rounder
- Producer: Bob Carlin

John Hartford chronology
Retrograss (1999)	Good Old Boys (1999)	Live from Mountain Stage (2000)

Good Old Boys is an album by American musician John Hartford, released in 1999.

== Reception ==
Professional ratings
Review scores
Source	Rating
AllMusic	3/5 stars

Writing for AllMusic, critic Ronnie D. Lankford, Jr. wrote that "Good Old Boys" is "something of a return to form for John Hartford... [it] doesn't stack up to Hartford's classic '70s albums, but it's a fun album that will please longtime fans." Kevin Oliver of Country Standard Time wrote "Hartford and his band make these new tunes sound old and lived – in, a comfortable fit for any ears."

== Track listing ==
All songs written by John Hartford.

1. "Good Old Boys" – 6:35
2. "On the Radio" – 5:31
3. "The Cross-Eyed Child" – 10:28
4. "Watching the River Go By" – 5:21
5. "The Waltz of the Mississippi" – 5:23
6. "Mike & John in the Wilderness" – 3:11
7. "Owl Feather" – 3:19
8. "Billy the Kid" – 4:32
9. "Dixie Trucker's Home" – 2:05
10. "The Waltz of the Golden Rule" – 2:57
11. "Keep on Truckin'" – 3:44

== Personnel ==
- John Hartford – banjo, fiddle, vocals, liner notes, photography
- Bob Carlin – banjo
- Mike Compton – mandolin, vocals
- Larry Perkins – banjo
- Mark Schatz – bass
- Chris Sharp – guitar, vocals

=== Production ===
- Produced by Bob Carlin
- Wes Lachot – engineer
- David Glasser – mastering
- Tom Piazza – liner notes
- David Lynch – design
- Brandon Kirk – interior photographs
