= Long in the Tooth (Billy Joe Shaver album) =

Studio album by Billy Joe Shaver
- Released: August 5, 2014
- Genre: Country
- Length: 32:09
- Label: Lightning Rod Records
- Producer: Ray Kennedy, Gary Nicholson

Billy Joe Shaver chronology
Everybody's Brother (2007)	Long in the Tooth (2014)

Long in the Tooth is the 23rd and final studio album by American country music singer-songwriter Billy Joe Shaver, released in 2014. With 10 newly-written songs, it followed Shaver's previous release after seven years. The album featured guest appearances by Willie Nelson, Leon Russell, and Tony Joe White.

The album was released to favorable reviews. It became Shaver's first album to chart on Billboard's Top Country Albums and the Billboard 200, peaking at 19 and 157 respectively.

== Recording ==
Seven years after his previous album Everybody's Brother was released, singer Todd Snider convinced Shaver to write new material and record a new album. Shaver called Ray Kennedy and Gary Nicholson to produce the release, consisting entirely of newly written material. Shaver co-wrote the title-track with actor Paul Gleason. Shaver defined the tracks and finished the writing while recording in the studio, completing previous ideas and selecting from his newly written work the ten tracks.

Tracks of the album featured guest appearances. Willie Nelson contributed to background vocals in "Hard To Be An Outlaw", while his harmonicist, Mickey Raphael played throughout the album. Leon Russell played piano in "Last Call For Alcohol" and Tony Joe White played guitar in the title-track. Before the release of Long In The Tooth, Nelson recorded and released "The Git Go" and "Hard To Be An Outlaw" in his country chart topper Band of Brothers.

== Release ==
On May 22, 2014, Rolling Stone premiered the single-duet with Willie Nelson "Hard To Be An Outlaw". The album was released on August 5, 2014 by Lightning Rod Records. After a 41-year career, Long in the Tooth became Billy Joe Shaver's first album to chart in Billboard's Top Country Albums, entering the chart at 19. The album also entered the Billboard 200, peaking at 157.

=== Critical reception ===
Professional ratings
Aggregate scores
Source	Rating
Metacritic	(76/100)
Review scores
Source	Rating
Allmusic	3.5/5 stars
American Songwriter	3.5/5 stars
Austin Chronicle	4/5 stars
Esquire	Positive
The National	4/5 stars
The Observer	3/5 stars
PopMatters	7/10
Record Collector	4/5 stars
Robert Christgau	A−
Uncut	8/10 stars

According to the aggregate scores website Metacritic, the album opened to "generally favorable reviews", based on eight reviews. Austin Chronicle rated the album with four stars out of five, declaring: "Here's Shaver the irascible honky-tonk hero, older but no less ornery". Record Collector rated it with four stars out of five, noting that Long in the Tooth offers "a masterclass in redneck storytelling".

PopMatters rated it with seven points out of ten. The review remarked the weakening of Shaver's voice, but called it "a wonderful, expressive instrument", stating that Shaver "delivers (the words) with pizzazz". Meanwhile, American Songwriter declared Shaver's voice "perfectly suited for this material", while it called the album a "short but terrific ten track set", rating it with three-and-a-half stars out of five. Allmusic also commented on Shaver's voice, and stated that "(it) has worn to a deep, rough rasp". The review emphatizised his songwriting, calling it "strong and as vital and world-weary wise as ever". Rating it with three stars out of five, The Observer declared: "Sometimes ornery, sometimes tender, this is how honky-tonk heroes grow old".

Esquire opined that the release was "arguably (Shaver's) most fully realized album in a 50-plus-year career". Meanwhile, Uncut rated it with eight points out of ten, calling it "a haunting, burning, world-weary tour de force on the ways of the world".

== Track listing ==
No.	Title	Writer(s)	Length
1.	"Hard to Be an Outlaw" (featuring Willie Nelson)	Billy Joe Shaver	3:03
2.	"Long in the Tooth"	Shaver, Paul Gleason	3:19
3.	"The Git Go"	Shaver, Gary Nicholson	3:57
4.	"Sunbeam Special"	Shaver, Nicholson	2:30
5.	"I Love You as Much as I Can"	Shaver, Nicholson	3:26
6.	"Last Call for Alcohol"	Shaver, Nicholson	3:56
7.	"Checkers & Chess"	Shaver, Ray Kennedy	2:29
8.	"American Me"	Shaver, Kennedy	3:25
9.	"I'm in Love"	Shaver	3:01
10.	"Music City USA"	Shaver	3:03
Total length:			32:09

== Personnel ==
- Shawn Camp - background vocals
- Chris Carmichael - strings
- Dan Dugmore - acoustic guitar, electric guitar, steel guitar
- Stuart Duncan - fiddle
- Larry Franklin - fiddle
- Joel Guzman - accordion
- Jedd Hughes - acoustic guitar, electric guitar
- Ray Kennedy - tremolo guitar, Wurlitzer
- Siobhan Kennedy - background vocals
- Willie Nelson - duet vocals on "Hard to Be an Outlaw"
- Gary Nicholson - acoustic guitar
- Mickey Raphael - harmonica, jews harp
- Jon Randall - background vocals
- Michael Rhodes - bass guitar
- Hargus "Pig" Robbins - piano
- Leon Russell - piano on "Last Call for Alcohol"
- Billy Joe Shaver - lead vocals
- Travis Toy - banjo
- Tony Joe White - electric guitar and background vocals on "Long in the Tooth"
- Lynn Williams - drums

== Chart performance ==
Chart (2014)	Peak position
US Billboard 200	157
US Top Country Albums (Billboard)	19
US Heatseekers Albums (Billboard)	4
US Independent Albums (Billboard)	23
