= Billy Joe Shaver =

American country singer (1939–2020)

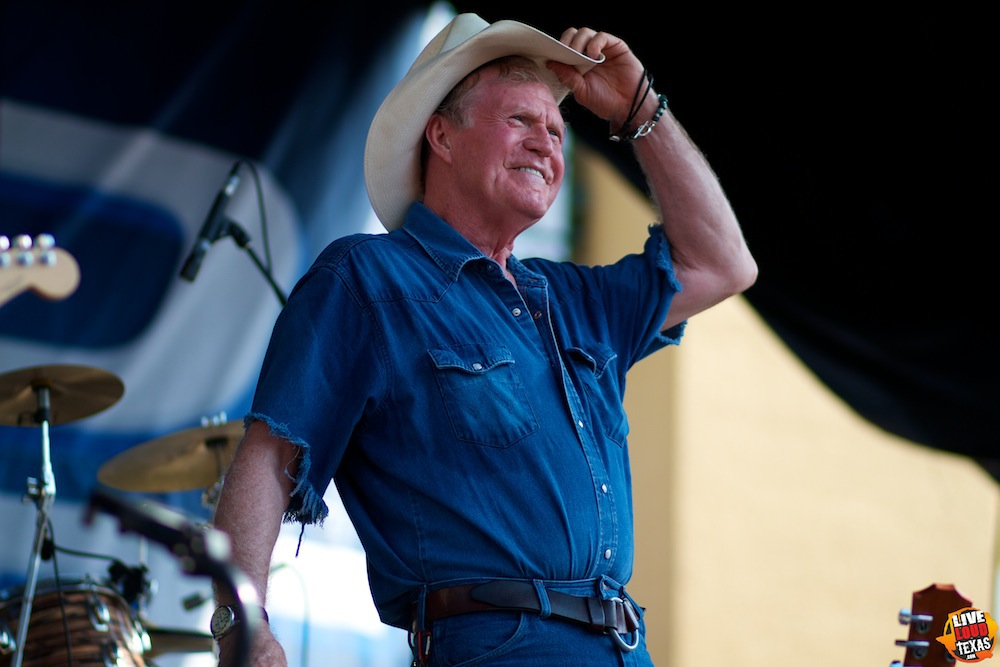
- Shaver live in Fort Worth, Texas on July 4th of 2011

Background information
- Born: August 16, 1939; Corsicana, Texas, U.S.
- Died: October 28, 2020 (aged 81) Waco, Texas, U.S.
- Genres: Outlaw country; progressive country
- Occupation: Singer-songwriter
- Instruments: Vocals, guitar
- Years active: 1970–2020
- Labels: Columbia, Monument
- Website: billyjoeshaver.com

Billy Joe Shaver (August 16, 1939 – October 28, 2020) was an American singer and songwriter.

Billy Joe was a prominent figure in the outlaw country genre. He is considered one of the great American songwriters of his generation. He has received praise from Bob Dylan, Willie Nelson, Kris Kristofferson and many others.

Artists including Elvis Presley, Tom Jones, Tom T. Hall and Johnny Cash have recorded his songs.

== Biography ==
Shaver was born in Corsicana, Texas, and raised by his mother, Victory Watson Shaver. Until he was 12, he spent a great deal of time with his grandmother in Corsicana, so his mother could work in Waco. He sometimes accompanied his mother to her job at a local nightclub, where he was first exposed to country music.

Shaver's mother remarried about the time that his grandmother died, and Shaver and his older sister Patricia moved in with their mother and new stepfather. Shaver left school after the eighth grade to help his uncles pick cotton, but occasionally returned to school to play sports.

Shaver joined the U.S. Navy on his 17th birthday. Upon his discharge, he worked on different jobs, including trying to be a rodeo clown. About this time, he met and married Brenda Joyce Tindell. They had one son, John Edwin, known as Eddy, who was born in 1962. The two divorced and remarried several times.

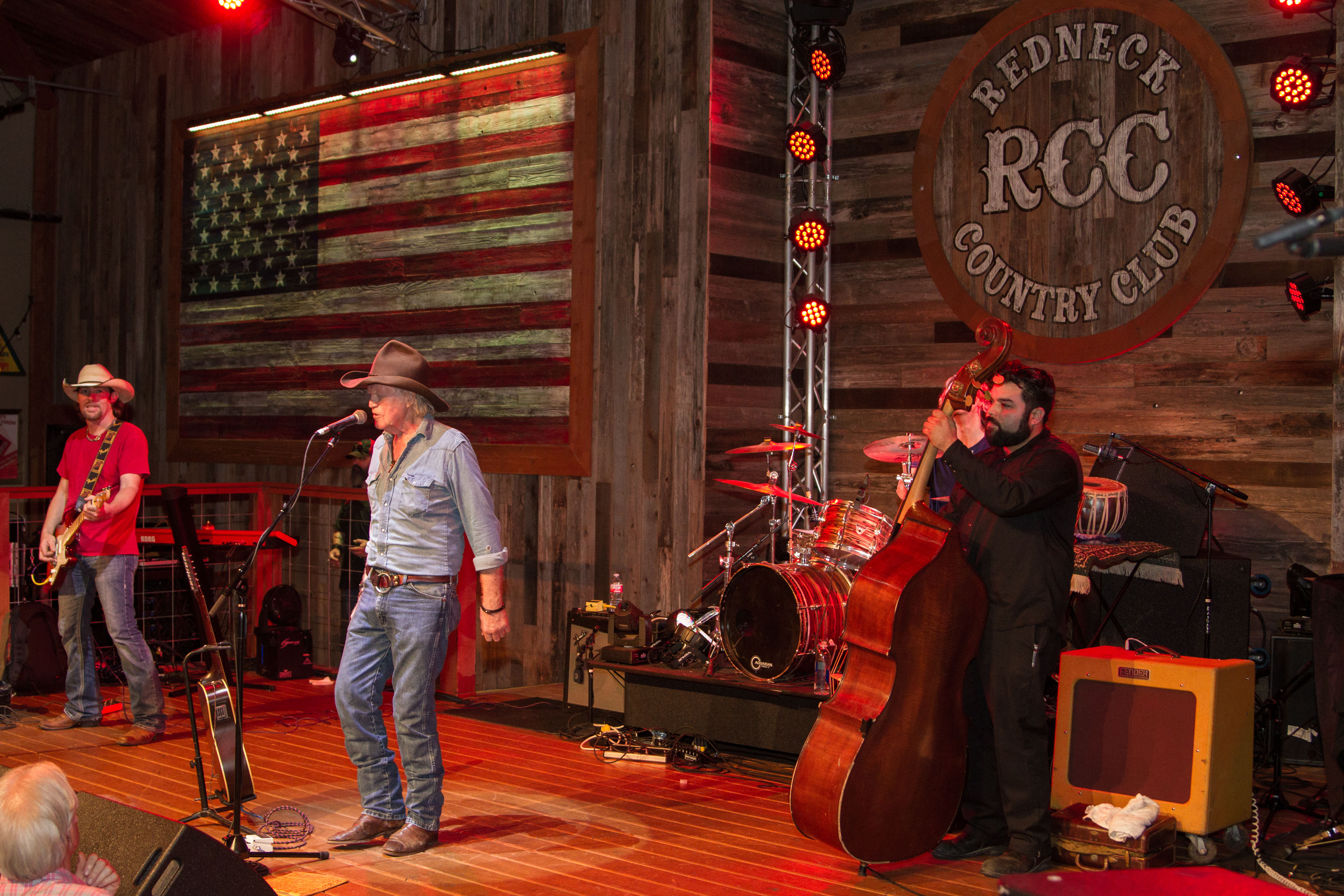
Billy Joe Shaver at the Redneck Country Club in Texas, 2015

Shaver took a job at a lumber mill to make ends meet. One day, his right (dominant) hand became caught in the machinery, and he lost the better part of two fingers and contracted a serious infection. He eventually recovered, and taught himself to play the guitar without the missing fingers.

Shaver set out to hitchhike to Los Angeles. He could not get a ride west, so he went to the other side of the highway and headed east, accompanying a man who dropped him off just outside Memphis, Tennessee. The next ride brought him to Nashville, where he found a job as a songwriter for $50 per week. His work came to the attention of Waylon Jennings, who filled his next album Honky Tonk Heroes almost entirely of Shaver's songs after meeting in a travel trailer at Willie Nelson's 4th of July picnic. Other artists, including Elvis Presley and Kris Kristofferson, began to record Shaver's music. This led to him getting his own record deal.

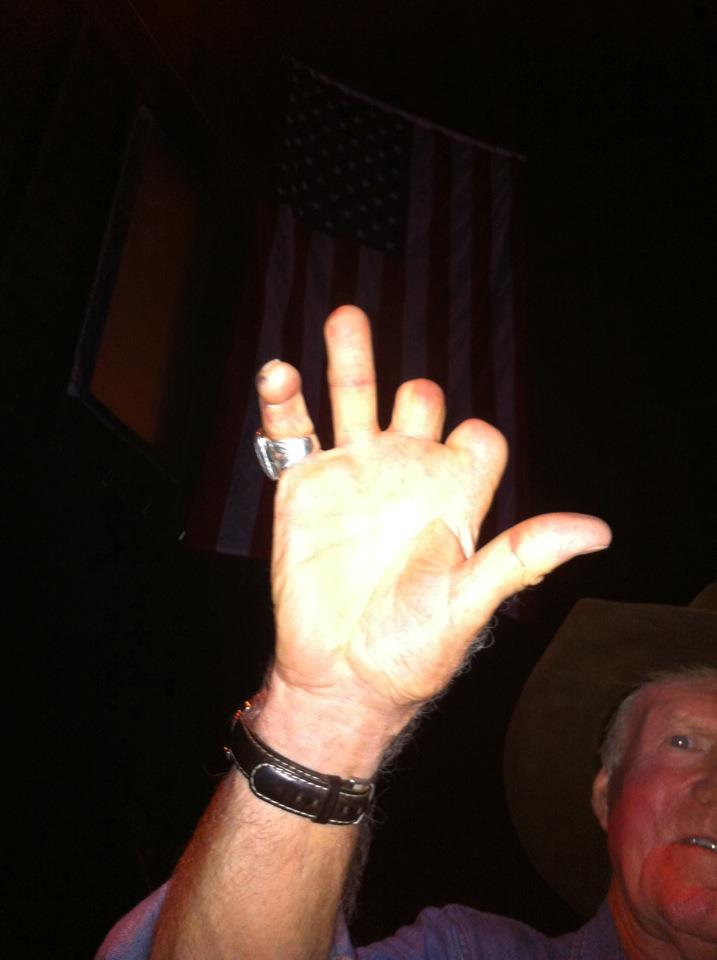
Shaver (pictured in 2011) lost two fingers in a sawmill accident when he was young.

The first few recording companies he signed with soon folded. He was never able to gain widespread recognition as a singer, although he never stopped recording his own music. On his records, he has been accompanied by other major rock and country musicians such as Willie Nelson, Nanci Griffith, Chuck Leavell and Dickey Betts (of the Allman Brothers), Charlie Daniels, Flaco Jiménez, and Al Kooper.

Bob Dylan mentioned Shaver in his song "I Feel a Change Comin' On" (Bob Dylan and Robert Hunter) on the album, Together Through Life (2009) – "I'm listening to Billy Joe Shaver, And I'm reading James Joyce". Shaver is also the "hero" of the song, "Why Can't I Write Like Billy Joe" on the album Stormy Love by Bugs Henderson.

Shaver's debut album, Old Five and Dimers Like Me (1973), contained many songs noted for being performed by other artists that were written by him, such as David Allan Coe and Waylon Jennings. When I Get My Wings (1976) included "Ain't No God In Mexico" (also a hit for Waylon Jennings). Gypsy Boy (1977) included "Honky Tonk Heroes" and "You Asked Me To", both songs written by Shaver for Jennings' 1973 album Honky Tonk Heroes.

Shaver is also known for his hit "Live Forever", co-written by his son Eddy; Robert Duvall performs it in the movie Crazy Heart, and it is included in the soundtrack. The song was also performed by The Highwaymen, Willie Nelson and Joe Ely. Shaver also wrote numerous songs for artists such as Patty Loveless and Willie Nelson.

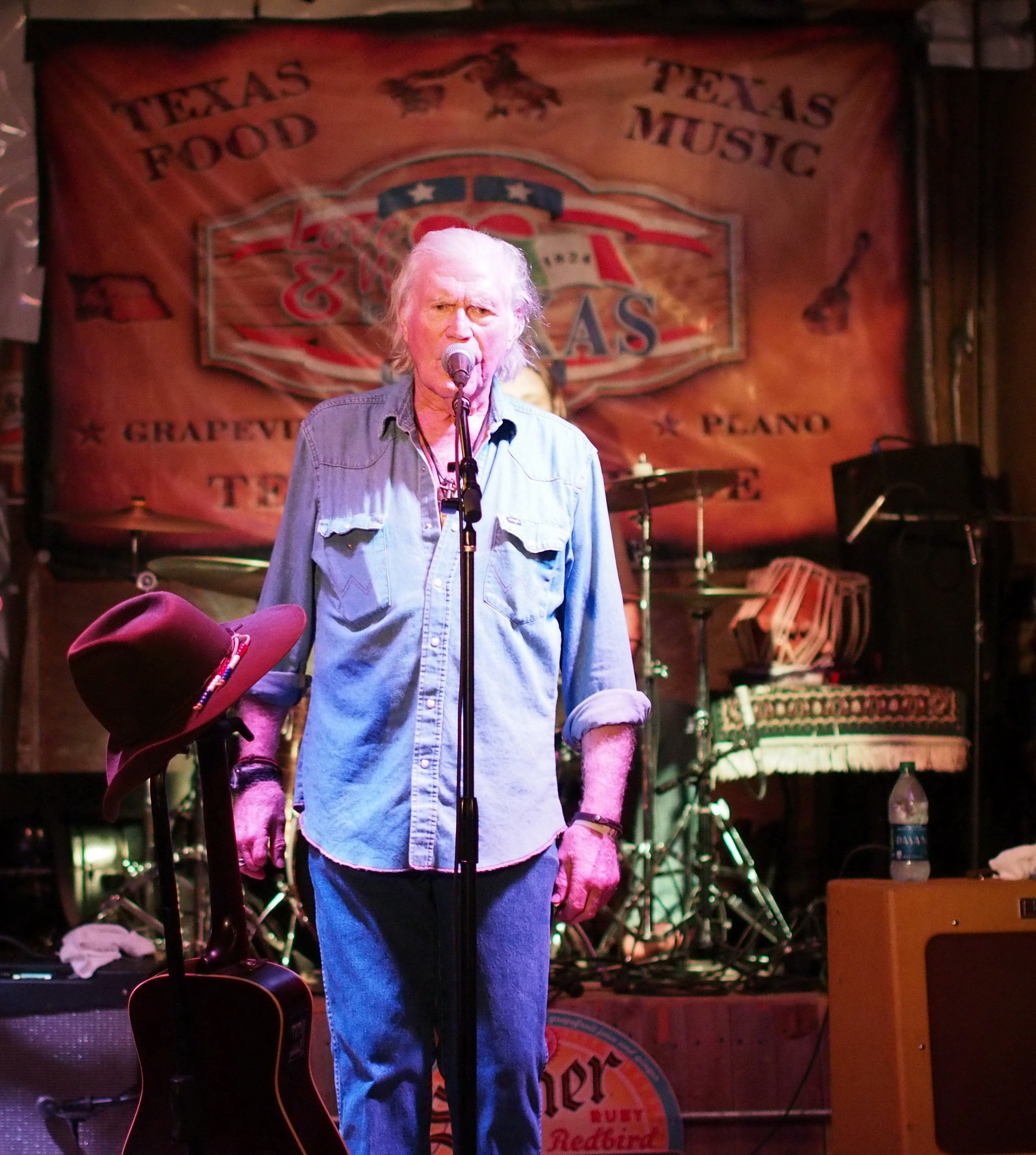
Shaver performing in 2015

After losing his wife, Brenda, and his mother to cancer in 1999, Shaver lost his son and longtime guitarist Eddy Shaver, who died at age 38 on December 31, 2000. The listed cause of death was a heroin overdose, but there were suspicious circumstances surrounding the case as his face was bruised as if he had been punched multiple times, and the daughter of an Austin police officer was at the residence at the time. Folk country artist Todd Snider wrote and dedicated his song "Waco Moon" to Eddy.

Shaver nearly died the following year when he had a heart attack on stage during an Independence Day show at Gruene Hall in New Braunfels, Texas. After successful heart surgery, Shaver came back to release Freedom's Child in 2002.

Shaver continued to release records throughout the 1990s; the most notable was the critically acclaimed Tramp On Your Street, released in 1993, which prominently featured the guitar playing of Eddy Shaver. In 1999, Shaver performed at the Grand Ole Opry. In November 2005, he performed on the CMT Outlaws in 2005. In 2006, Shaver was inducted in the Texas Country Music Hall of Fame. He later served as spiritual advisor to Texas independent gubernatorial candidate Kinky Friedman. For his efforts, the Americana Music Convention awarded him their Lifetime Achievement Award in Songwriting. He lived in Waco, Texas.

Shaver's 2007 album country gospel style Everybody's Brother was Grammy-nominated. Many of the songs are duets with artists such as Johnny Cash, Kris Kristofferson, and Tanya Tucker. Musicians playing on the album included Randy Scruggs, Laura Cash, John Anderson, and Marty Stuart.

On May 22, 2014, Rolling Stone premiered the single-duet with Willie Nelson "Hard To Be An Outlaw". The album, Long in the Tooth was released on August 5, 2014, by Lightning Rod Records. After a 41-year career, Long in the Tooth became Shaver's first album to chart in Billboard's Top Country Albums, entering the chart at 19. The album also entered the Billboard 200, peaking at 157.

In 2019, Shaver received the Poet's Award from the Academy of Country Music to honor his achievements in songwriting.

In 2022 a tribute album of Shaver's songs was released Live Forever: A Tribute To Billy Joe Shaver which include tracks from Willie Nelson, Lucinda Williams, Ryan Bingham, Nikki Lane, Rodney Crowell, George Strait, Miranda Lambert, Steve Earle, Nathaniel Rateliff, Amanda Shires, Margo Price, and others.

His losses and excesses inspired some of the greatest songs in the English language

— Andrew Dansby, article of the Houston Chronicle, 2007

In 2023, Shaver's voice appeared on Tanya Tucker’s critically acclaimed album Sweet Western Sound. Shaver’s voice appeared at the beginning to open the album and at the end to close the album.

=== Death ===
Shaver died on October 28, 2020, from a stroke at the age of 81.

== Artistry and influence ==
You fathers and you mothers/ Be good to one another/ Please try to raise your children right/ Don't let the darkness take 'em/ Don't make 'em feel forsaken/ Just lead them safely to the light/

— Billy Joe Shaver, Live Forever

Billy Joe was a prominent figure in the outlaw country genre. He is considered one of the greatest songwriters in country history. Johnny Cash cited him as "One of the greatest songwriters" and Kris Kristofferson said that his lyrics were "on the same level of Ernest Hemingway's books".

== Shooting at Lorena, Texas ==
On April 2, 2007, police in Lorena, Texas, issued two arrest warrants for Shaver on charges of aggravated assault and possessing a firearm in a prohibited place, in connection with an incident outside a tavern, Papa Joe's Texas Saloon, in Lorena two days prior, on March 31, in which Shaver shot a man, Billy Bryant Coker, in the face with a handgun. Coker's injuries, however, were not reported as life-threatening.

Witnesses interviewed by police report hearing Shaver say "Where do you want it?" and then, after the shot was fired, "Tell me you are sorry." and "No one tells me to shut up." Coker told police the attack was unprovoked. Shaver's attorney declared that Shaver had shot Coker "in self-defense" after Coker threatened Shaver with a knife.

In an August 2014 NPR interview, Shaver said that he shot Coker because he was "such a bully" and that "I hit him right between a mother and a fucker. That was the end of that. He dropped his weapons and said, 'I'm sorry.' And I said, 'Well, if you had said that inside, there would have been no problem.'"

After unsuccessfully attempting to surrender to police in Austin, who were unaware of the warrant, Shaver turned himself in at McLennan County Jail in Waco on April 3. He was released after an hour on $50,000 bond and gave his scheduled performance at Waterloo Records in Austin that evening, where he reportedly told fans, "Don't forget to pray for me, and tell your kids to pray for me, too."

He was acquitted in a Waco court on April 9, 2010, after testifying that he acted in self-defense, with friends Willie Nelson and Robert Duvall in attendance for support.

Texas-based country musician Dale Watson wrote a song about the incident titled "Where Do You Want It?". The song has been recorded by Whitey Morgan and the 78's and appears on their self-titled second album, released by Bloodshot Records.

== Acting ==
In 1996, Shaver took a part in the film The Apostle playing opposite Robert Duvall. He had additional speaking roles in the Duvall film Secondhand Lions (2003) and in The Wendell Baker Story (2005).

In 2004, a documentary of his life, A Portrait of Billy Joe, was released. The documentary was directed by Luciana Pedraza. In 2006, a documentary of a concert, Billy Joe Shaver – North Carolina 2006 was released on YouTube along with a limited number of DVDs. The documentary was directed by Guy Schwartz, whom Eddie Shaver listed as a musical mentor, and was shot at the Stevens Center at University of North Carolina School of the Arts in Winston-Salem, North Carolina.

In 2008, he co-starred with Bill Engvall and Billy Ray Cyrus in the made-for-TV USA Network movie, Bait Shop. In 2016, he had a cameo in the TV series Still the King, also alongside Cyrus.

Comedian Norm Macdonald was an avid Shaver fan and personal friend, opening his book Based on a True Story with a quote from one of his songs, and praising his songwriting on his podcast Norm Macdonald Live. In 2018, Shaver appeared as a guest on Macdonald's Netflix program Norm Macdonald Has a Show. In addition, Shaver's song I'm Just an Old Chunk of Coal, was chosen as the closing music for Macdonald's posthumous Netflix comedy release of 2022 Norm Macdonald: Nothing Special and Live Forever was used in the end credits of Judd Apatow's 2026 documentary Norm: The Tale of Norm Macdonald.

Shaver's voice is heard on the themes to the Adult Swim television show Squidbillies. The opening themes are only a stanza long and end with a sotto voce spoken-word portion. Season 1 Episode 5 of Mike Judge's Tales From The Tour Bus features the life of Shaver.

Awards
First None recognized before	AMA Lifetime Achievement Award for Songwriting; 2002	Succeeded by John Prine
