= Eddy Shaver =

American musician (1962–2000)

John Edwin "Eddy" Shaver (June 20, 1962 – December 31, 2000) was an American country-rock guitarist, arranger, and songwriter.

== Biography ==
The son of country artist and songwriter Billy Joe Shaver, Eddy learned to play guitar at an early age, tutored by Allman Brothers Band guitarist, Dickey Betts, who gave Eddy his first guitar. As a young man, he accompanied his father as well as country music greats Willie Nelson, Guy Clark, Waylon Jennings, Kris Kristofferson, and Dwight Yoakam.

Later, Shaver performed with his father in the duo Shaver. Together, they recorded several critically acclaimed albums.

Shaver recorded his first (and only) solo album during 1996 for the French record label, Dixiefrog Records. The album is titled Baptism Of Fire.

Shaver died of a heroin overdose on December 31, 2000, in Waco, Texas. Folk singer Todd Snider wrote the song "Waco Moon" upon hearing about Shaver's death.
