= Annual Waltz =

Studio album by John Hartford
- Released: 1987
- Genre: Bluegrass, country
- Length: 29:47
- Label: Dot
- Producer: Jack Clement

John Hartford chronology
Vassar Clements, John Hartford, Dave Holland (1985)	Annual Waltz (1987)	Me Oh My, How the Time Does Fly: A John Hartford Anthology (1987)

Annual Waltz is an album by the American musician John Hartford, released in 1987. Recorded in Nashville, the album was produced by Jack Clement. It was nominated for a Grammy Award, in the "Best Contemporary Folk Recording" category.

== Track listing ==
All songs by John Hartford unless otherwise noted.

1. "All in My Love for You" – 2:25
2. "Ohio River Rag" – 3:57
3. "Annual Waltz" – 3:52
4. "Gone, Gone, Gone" (Harlan Howard) – 1:54
5. "Love Wrote This Song" (Hartford, Charles Cochran) – 2:43
6. "Learning to Smile All Over Again" – 3:26
7. "Pennington Bend" – 3:45
8. "Here's to Your Dreams" – 4:14
9. "Short Life of Trouble" – 1:36
10. "Living in the Mississippi Valley" – 1:55

== Personnel ==
- John Hartford – banjo, fiddle, guitar, harmony vocals
- Mark Howard – guitar, mandolin
- Roy Huskey, Jr. – bass
- Jack Clement – guitar
- Kenny Malone – percussion
- Jonathan Yudkin – fiddle, mandolin
- Gary Janney – harmony vocals

Production

- Jack Clement – producer
- Richard Adler – mixing
- Milan Bogdan – master tape preparation
- Camile Engel – design
- Simon Levy – art direction
- Glenn Meadows – master tape preparation
- Mark Howard – engineer, mixing
