= No End of Love =

Studio album by John Hartford
- Released: August 6, 1996
- Genre: Bluegrass
- Label: Small Dog A-Barkin'

John Hartford chronology
Live at College Station Pennsylvania (1995)	No End of Love (1996)	Wild Hog in the Red Brush (1996)

No End of Love is a bluegrass album by American musician John Hartford, released in 1996 (see 1996 in music).

== Track listing ==
1. "Dialog" – 0:07
2. "No End of Love" – 4:04
3. "Dialog" – 0:17
4. "When Guiding Star Came to Tell City" – 5:26
5. "Dialog" – 0:14
6. "Gentle on My Mind" – 3:36
7. "Railroad Cap" – 2:02
8. "Down on the Levee" – 3:11
9. "My Tears Don't Show" (Carl Butler) – 3:17
10. "Dialog" – 0:55
11. "The Burning of the Grand Republic" – 3:16
12. "Dialog" – 0:11
13. "Uncle Dink" – 2:44
14. "Dialog" – 0:08
15. "Medicine Chest" – 2:09
16. "Goodbye Waltz" – 5:19

== Personnel ==
- John Hartford – vocals, banjo, fiddle, guitar
- Mike Compton – mandolin
