= Bob Carlin =

American banjo player (born 1953)

- Born: March 17, 1953 (age 73); New York City, New York, U.S.
- Genres: Old-time; clawhammer
- Occupation: musician
- Instruments: banjo, guitar

Bob Carlin (born March 17, 1953, in New York City) is an American old-time banjo player and singer.

Carlin performs primarily in the clawhammer style of banjo. He has toured the United States, Canada, and Europe performing on various historical banjos (including gourd banjos), and has explored the African roots of the banjo by working with the Malian musician Cheick Hamala Diabate and the elder African American fiddler Joe Thompson. He is also one of the few musicians skilled in the performance of minstrel-style banjo songs of the mid-19th century. He also occasionally plays guitar.

For six years, Carlin toured throughout the United States, Canada, and Japan with John Hartford.

Carlin is a three-time winner of the late Frets Magazine readers' poll. He has released four albums on Rounder Records as well as several instruction manuals and videos for the banjo.

With his brother Richard Carlin (also a musician, author and record producer, b. 1956), Bob co-authored "Southern Exposure: The Story of Southern Music in Pictures and Words" (Billboard Books 2000), for which John Hartford wrote the foreword.

Bob Carlin is the founder of CarTunes Recordings, and also works as a record producer. He lives in Lexington, NC with his wife and son, Benjamin Morris 'Leonardo' Carlin.

== Discography ==
Solo

- Fiddle Tunes For Clawhammer Banjo (Rounder 0132, 1980)
- Where Did You Get That Hat? (Rounder 0172, 1982)
- Banging & Sawing (Rounder 0197, 1985)
- Mr. Spaceman (CarTunes 102, 1997)

With Debby McClatchy, Malcolm Dalglish, and Grey Larsen

- Off To California (Wildebeest WB006, 1981)

With Bruce Molsky

- Take Me As I Am (Marimac 9023, 1989) (reissued on CarTunes 105 in 2004)

With John Hartford

- The Fun Of Open Discussion (Rounder CD0320, 1995)

With Cheick Hamala Diabaté

- From Mali To America (5-String Productions 5SP06004, 2007)

With The Hartford String Band

- Good Old Boys (with John Hartford) (Rounder 0462)

With The John Hartford String Band

- Memories Of John (Compass 7 4539 2, 2010)

With The Piedmont Pepsteppers

- Sister Ann (Tom Mylet on banjo, Tom Schaffer on bass, Kirk Sutphin on fiddle, Bob Carlin and Lisa Sutphin on guitar, and George Silverstein on mandolin) on The Young Fogies, Volume 2 (Rounder 0369, 1995)
