= Mike Compton (musician) =

American mandolinist (born 1956)

- Born: February 29, 1956 (age 70); Meridian, Mississippi, U.S.
- Genres: Bluegrass music, folk music, acoustic music, country blues, old-time music
- Occupations: Mandolinist, backing vocalist
- Instrument: Mandolin
- Years active: 1975–present
- Website: mikecompton.net

Mike Compton (born February 29, 1956) is an American mandolinist who has worked in bluegrass music, old-time music, folk music, and country blues. Compton is recognized for his interpretation of Bill Monroe’s mandolin style, performing as both a solo artist and with ensembles. Over a career spanning nearly five decades, he has collaborated with artists including John Hartford, Doc Watson, Elvis Costello, and Sting.

Compton is a founding member of the Nashville Bluegrass Band and contributed to the Grammy Award-winning soundtrack for O Brother, Where Art Thou?, which helped renew interest in bluegrass and roots music. His discography includes over 120 recordings, and he serves as an instructor, hosting the annual Monroe Mandolin Camp. Compton has received multiple International Bluegrass Music Association award nominations and a commendation from the Mississippi State Senate.

== Biography ==
Mentored by Bill Monroe, known as the "Father of Bluegrass Music," Mike Compton is recognized for his interpretation of Monroe's mandolin style. Compton runs an annual Monroe Mandolin Camp in Nashville, Tennessee, where he, along with other instructors, teaches bluegrass mandolin techniques, including foundational skills and advanced aspects of Monroe's playing style.

Mike Compton has toured and recorded over several decades with musicians across various genres, including Sting, Gregg Allman, Elvis Costello, John Hartford, Doc Watson, Peter Rowan, Ralph Stanley, and David Grisman. His collaborations and performances have contributed to his reputation as an accomplished mandolin player and an interpreter of roots and Americana musical styles.

Compton is known for his skills as a mandolin player, as well as his abilities as a singer, arranger, composer, and accompanist. He has performed as a soloist and with various groups at festivals, clubs, concert halls, recording sessions, and music workshops, and he also offers private instruction. With a discography of over 120 recordings, including collaborations with Willie Nelson, Dolly Parton, and Patty Loveless, Compton continues to perform and record in a range of musical styles.

A native of Meridian, Mississippi, Compton began playing mandolin in his teens, influenced by the region's blues, old-time country, and bluegrass traditions. His musical background was influenced by his great-grandfather, who was an old-time fiddler. Compton initially played trombone, then switched to guitar, and later to mandolin, playing old-time music with his cousin. He developed an interest in bluegrass music, particularly the style of Bill Monroe, whom he met at the Bean Blossom Bluegrass Festival in 1975.

After completing his education at Meridian Junior College, Compton moved to Nashville and joined Hubert Davis and the Season Travelers in 1977. He left the band in 1981 and spent the early 1980s working various jobs, including as a cook, a printer, and a part-time musician. In the mid-1980s, Compton co-founded the Nashville Bluegrass Band. Following a bus accident that left bandmate Mark Hembree injured, Compton took a break from the music industry and moved to the Catskills, where he worked as a cottage caretaker. He continued recording music with various artists and, in 1995, recorded with Bill Monroe's Bluegrass Boys. In the mid-1990s, Compton joined John Hartford on tour and recorded several albums with him. In 2000, Compton rejoined the Nashville Bluegrass Band and continues to perform with the group. He also tours internationally with the duo Compton & Newberry, the Helen Highwater Stringband, and as a solo artist.

Producer T Bone Burnett selected Compton to contribute his mandolin expertise to the O Brother, Where Art Thou? film soundtrack and tour, helping to shape the authentic sound of the Soggy Bottom Boys. The soundtrack won the Grammy Award for Album of the Year, sold seven million copies, and played a role in reviving interest in old-time and bluegrass music.

== Musical style ==
Compton performs a range of musical styles, including bluegrass, old-time string band music, country blues, and roots Americana. He incorporates rural, roots-based lead and rhythm mandolin styles into modern Americana music, appealing to diverse audiences across various musical genres.

== Awards ==
In 2001 and 2002, Compton was nominated as IBMA Mandolinist of the Year. In 2002, O Brother, Where Art Thou?, an album containing one of his songs, was awarded the Grammy Award for best album. In recognition of his achievements, he received a commendation from the Mississippi State Senate.

== See also ==
- Bluegrass music
- Country music
- Mandolin
- Grammy Awards
- International Bluegrass Music Association
- Americana Music Association
- Grand Ole Opry

== Bibliography ==
- Carlin, Richard (2003), Country Music: A Biographical Dictionary, Taylor & Francis
- Rosenberg, Neil V. - Wolfe, Charles K. (2007), The Music of Bill Monroe, University of Illinois Press
