= The Love Album =

The Love Album may refer to:

- The Love Album (John Hartford album), 1968
- The Love Album (Bobby Vinton album), 1971 compilation album
- The Love Album (Doris Day album), 1994
- The Love Album (Westlife album), 2006
- The Love Album: Off the Grid, a 2023 album by Diddy
- The Love Album, by Trini Lopez, 1965
- The Love Album, 1990 compilation album by Shirley Bassey

== See also ==
- Love... The Album, a 2007 album by Cliff Richard
- Albums listed at Love (disambiguation)
