= Michael Tarbi =

American artist

Michael Tarbi (born 1980) is an American artist and painter currently living in New York.

== Life and work ==
Tarbi's work has been included in museum exhibitions from an early age including the Corcoran Gallery of Art, Washington D.C.; MASS MoCA, North Adams, Carnegie Museum of Art, Pittsburgh; the Institute of Contemporary Art, Philadelphia, and the Hyde Park Art Center, Chicago along with solo exhibitions that include MH-project-NYC, New York and Thomas Robertello Gallery, Chicago. Tarbi's work has been featured in publications such as: New American Paintings, Draft - the Journal of Process, Post-Human: CICA Museum, and the Artbook; Signs of the Apocalypse/Rapture by Front40 Press. He is a recipient of the New York Foundation for the Arts Fellowship, the American Visions Award from the Alliance for Young Artists and Writers, and the Henry J. Scheit Travel Scholarship, PaFA. In addition, Tarbi has participated in gallery exhibitions that include Pierogi, New York, James Cohen Gallery, New York and White Box, New York. He is a graduate of the Pennsylvania Academy of the Fine Arts, Philadelphia.

== Education ==
Tarbi studied at the Pennsylvania Academy of the Fine Arts, Philadelphia from 1998 to 2002. There he received numerous awards including "the Angelo Pinto Prize for Experimental Work" and "the Henry J. Schiet Travel Scholarship".

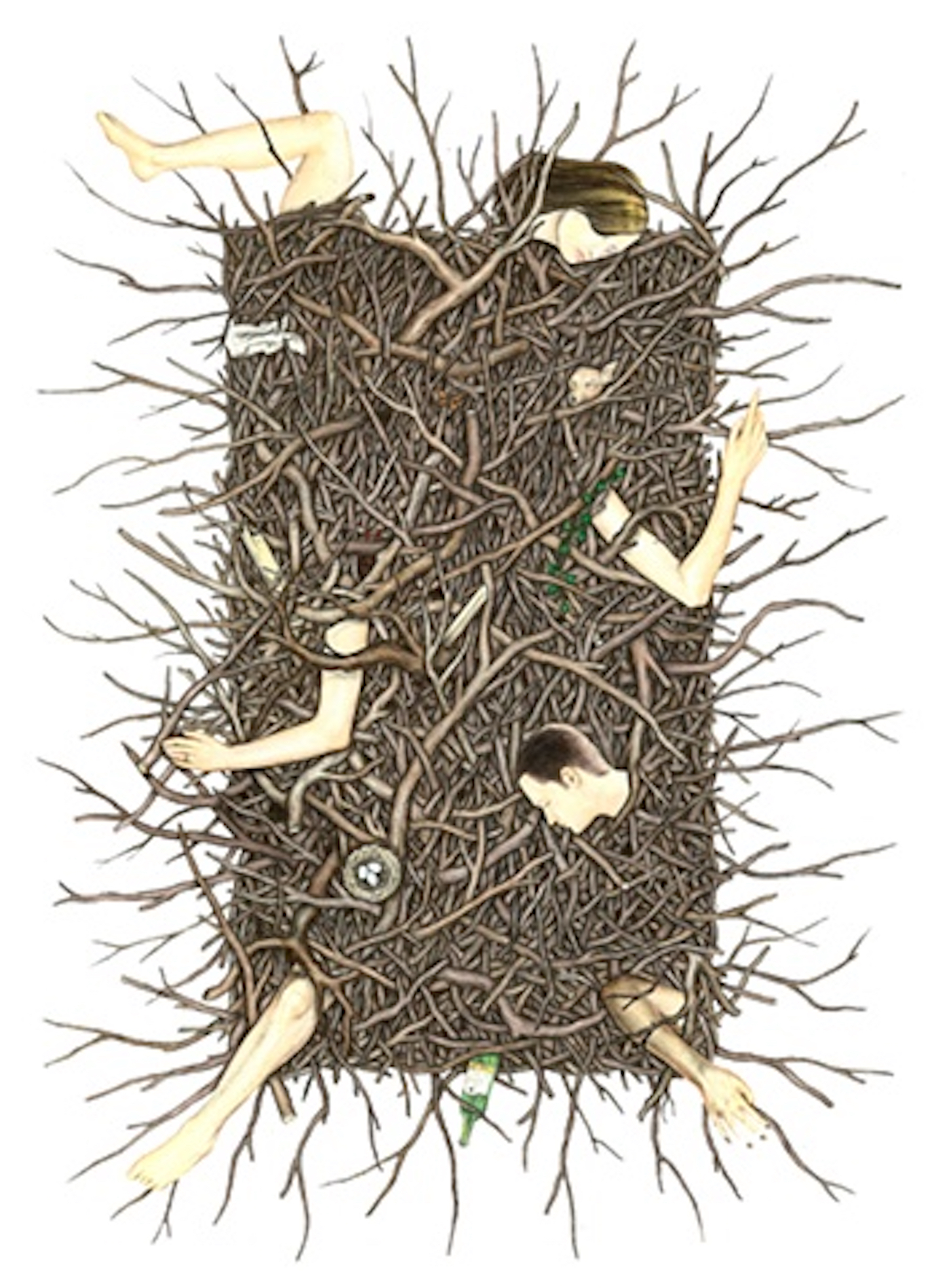
Tarbi's 2011 work entitled, "In Marriage"
