= Look at Life =

Look at Life may refer to:

- Look at Life (film series), British cinema series produced by the Rank Organisation during the 1960s
- Look at Life (film), student film by George Lucas
- Looks at Life, 1967 album by John Hartford
