= Aereo-Plain =

Studio album by John Hartford
- Released: September 1971
- Recorded: 1971
- Genre: Bluegrass
- Length: 40:04
- Label: Warner Bros.
- Producer: David Bromberg

John Hartford chronology
Iron Mountain Depot (1970)	Aereo-Plain (1971)	Morning Bugle (1972)

Aereo-Plain is a 1971 studio album by American bluegrass singer-songwriter and instrumentalist John Hartford. It reached number 193 on the Billboard 200.

== Background ==
The music on Aereo-Plain is a blend of traditional bluegrass musicianship and the hippie spirit of the '70s. The album sold so poorly that Warner Bros. decided to devote no promotion at all to Hartford's next release Morning Bugle. Nevertheless, Aereo-Plain has been called the forerunner of the genre now known as "Newgrass". Hartford subsequently asked to be released from his contract and later signed with Flying Fish Records.

The other members of the Aereo-Plain Band were bluegrass veterans Norman Blake, Vassar Clements, Tut Taylor, and Randy Scruggs. The sessions were controlled but relaxed, as Taylor commented, "John let us play what we wanted to play. 'Cause that's one of the beautiful parts about it—he just let us get in there and pick." Producer David Bromberg recounted, "We'd sit around and smoke pot and play "Sally Goodin" for an hour and a half. That approach kind of became, after a while, newgrass." Hartford instructed Bromberg to "let the tapes roll, we don't want to hear playbacks until you've put the master together."

In 2002 Steam Powered Aereo-Takes was released, which was a collection of outtakes and demos from the recording sessions for this album.

== Cover ==
The cover features a bearded, long-haired Hartford wearing old style, aviator goggles, a distinct contrast from his previous appearance as a regular on The Glen Campbell Goodtime Hour. On the original LP, the title is spelled "Aereo-Plain" but the title of the song is labeled "Steam Powered Aereo-plane".

== Reception ==
Professional ratings
Review scores
Source	Rating
AllMusic	4.5/5 stars
Christgau's Record Guide	B+

Aereo-Plain has received high praise in retrospective reviews. AllMusic's Ronnie D. Lankford, Jr. wrote, "The cult following of Aereo-Plain... has less to do with the music than with Hartford's quirky songs and even quirkier approach... One of the attractions to this material is that Hartford seems to be in his element, just doing what comes natural to him... Aereo-Plain signaled the full blooming of his eccentric talent. This is an essential album for any fan, revealing both his genius and the glory days of early '70s progressive bluegrass."

Robert Christgau wrote, "I must admit that Norman Blake's guitar, Tut Taylor's dobro, and Vassar Clements's fiddle complement Hartford with tact, wit, and sly razzmatazz. But I insist that it's Hartford's funny, quirkish songs, rather than his banjo, that save me from continued boorishness."

Stylus Magazine's 2006 review praised Hartford and the album: "It would be easy to call Aereo-Plain an 'Old Weird America' classic, but Hartford’s loves were never so static, and he seemed in on the joke besides. Shame, then, that the augurs of American music never smiled on Hartford the way he beamed on them."

== Track listing ==
All tracks composed by John Hartford; except where indicated

1. "Turn Your Radio On" (Albert E. Brumley) – 1:22
2. "Steamboat Whistle Blues" – 3:23
3. "Back in the Goodle Days" – 3:34
4. "Up on the Hill Where They Do the Boogie" – 2:43
5. "Boogie" – 1:42
6. "First Girl I Loved" – 4:35
7. "Presbyterian Guitar" – 2:04
8. "With a Vamp in the Middle" – 3:25
9. "Symphony Hall Rag" – 2:48
10. "Because of You" – 1:02
11. "Steam Powered Aereo Plane" – 3:43
12. "Holding" – 1:47
13. "Tear Down the Grand Ole Opry" (Hartford, Robert Taylor) – 3:28
14. "Leather Britches" (Traditional) – 1:58
15. "Station Break" – 0:13
16. "Turn Your Radio On" (Albert E. Brumley) – 2:16

== Personnel ==
- John Hartford – banjo, guitar, violin, vocals
- Norman Blake – guitar, mandolin, vocals
- Vassar Clements – violin, cello, viola, vocals
- Tut Taylor – Dobro, vocals
- Randy Scruggs – electric bass, vocals

Production

- David Bromberg – producer
- Warren Dewey – engineer
- Claude Hill – engineer
- Toby Mountain – mixing
- Peter Amft – photography (son of Robert Amft)
- Sam Bush – liner notes
