= Housing Project (album) =

Studio album by John Hartford
- Released: 1968
- Genre: Folk, country, novelty
- Label: RCA Victor
- Producer: Felton Jarvis

John Hartford chronology
The Love Album (1968)	Housing Project (1968)	John Hartford (1969)

Alternative cover

Housing Project is John Hartford's fourth album, released in 1968. Like all of his RCA recordings, it was reissued in 2002 as part of a "twofer" CD, combined with his third album, The Love Album.

== Reception ==
Professional ratings
Review scores
Source	Rating
AllMusic	4/5 stars
AllMusic	3.5/5 stars

Music critic Richie Unterberger, writing for AllMusic, called the album "off-kilter country-pop with liberal smidgens of bluegrass and intellectual folk-rock lyricism. It was little less ornately produced than its immediate predecessor, The Love Album, but the arrangements remained chock-full of surprising interjections..."

== Track listing ==
All tracks written by John Hartford.

1. "Housing Project"
2. "I'm Still Here"
3. "Crystallia Daydream"
4. "The Girl with the Long Brown Hair"
5. "I Didn't Know the World Would Last This Long"
6. "The Sailboat Song"
7. "The Category Stomp"
8. "Go Fall Asleep Now"
9. "My Face"
10. "Big Blue Balloon"
11. "In Like Of"
12. "Shiny Rails of Steel"

== Personnel ==
- John Hartford – banjo, guitar, fiddle, vocals
