= Iron Mountain Depot =

Studio album by John Hartford
- Released: 1970
- Genre: Folk, country, novelty
- Label: RCA Victor
- Producer: Felton Jarvis

John Hartford chronology
| John Hartford (1969) | Iron Mountain Depot (1970) | Aereo-Plain (1971) |

Alternative cover
- 2002 BMG Re-issue

Iron Mountain Depot is John Hartford's sixth and final album issued by RCA Victor, released in 1970.

== Background ==
After decreasing sales of his previous album and Iron Mountain Depot, Hartford recorded another album for RCA in 1971, Radio John, that they chose not to release. It included an early version of "In Tall Buildings" which he would return to in 1976 on Nobody Knows What You Do. Hartford asked for, and was given, his release from his contract. He signed with Warner Bros. and subsequently released two albums on that label.

Like all of his RCA recordings, Iron Mountain Depot was reissued in 2002. In the reissue package, Iron Mountain Depot is combined with his fifth album, John Hartford, and the unreleased material from Radio John.

== Reception ==
Professional ratings
Review scores
| Source | Rating |
|---|---|
| Allmusic | 3/5 stars |
| Allmusic | 3/5 stars |

Music critic Richie Unterberger, writing for Allmusic, called the album "a little less inspired than much of his prior work for the label. It's not much different than his previous work for the company in the late '60s. It's just not as abundant in left-field ideas and sounds a little more casual and tossed-off. That stated, it's still among the goofiest, normal-save-constant-sly-winking country-pop ever made." Of the reissue, Ronnie D. Lankford, Jr. called Radio John "the missing link" in Hartford's career and summing up the compilation, wrote; "Radio John alone makes this CD set worth having."

== Track listings ==
=== 1970 release ===
All songs written by John Hartford, except where noted.

1. "Like Unto a Mockingbird" – 4:11
2. "Meanwhile You Sit by My Banjo" – 2:47
3. "I Won't Know Why I Went Till After I Get Back" – 3:01
4. "Maybe" – 1:39
5. "Go Home Girl" – 3:17
6. "Natural to Be Gone" – 3:05
7. "Before They Tow My Car Away" – 3:02
8. "To Say" – 3:40
9. "Frustrated Bird" – 2:39
10. "Hey Jude" (John Lennon, Paul McCartney) – 6:53

=== 2002 release ===
All songs written by John Hartford, except where noted.

1. "Dusty Miller Hornpipe and Fugue in A Major for Strings, Brass and 5-String Banjo" – 2:12
2. "I've Heard That Tearstained Monologue You Do There By the Door Before You Go" – 3:48
3. "The Collector" – 3:21
4. "A Short Sentimental Interlude" – 1:08
5. "Mr. Jackson's Got Nothing to Do" – 2:44
6. "Open Rode Ode" – 2:32
7. "Little Piece in D" – 2:52
8. "The Old Prurient Interest Blues" – 2:45
9. "The Wart" – 0:59
10. "Railroad Street" – 2:19
11. "Another Short (But Not So Sentimental) Interlude" – 0:43
12. "Orphan of World War II" – 2:43
13. "The Little Old Lonesome Little Circle Song" – 1:49
14. "I Didn't Know The World Would Last This Long" – 3:52
  - Tracks 1 to 14 originally appeared on the 1969 release John Hartford.
15. "Like Unto a Mockingbird" – 2:12
16. "Meanwhile You Sit by My Banjo" – 3:48
17. "I Won't Know Why I Went Till After I Get Back" – 3:21
18. "Maybe" – 1:08
19. "Go Home Girl" – 2:44
20. "Natural to Be Gone" – 2:32
21. "Before They Tow My Car Away" – 2:52
22. "To Say" – 2:45
23. "Frustrated Bird" – 0:59
24. "Hey Jude" (John Lennon, Paul McCartney) – 2:19
  - Tracks 15 to 24 appeared on the original 1970 release of Iron Mountain Depot.
25. "Skippin' in the Mississippi Dew" – 2:28
26. "Self Made Man" – 3:53
27. "In Tall Buildings" – 3:12
28. "And the Band Played On" – 4:07
29. "Orange Blossom Special" (Ervin Rouse) – 5:48
30. "Bed on My Mind" – 3:29
31. "Waugh Paugh" – 4:48
32. "White Lightning" (J. P. Richardson) – 4:00
33. "Sunshine Lady, You Really Know How to Slow a Man Down" – 3:20
34. "I Don't Love Nobody" – 5:21
35. "California Earthquake" – 3:04
36. "Mouth to Mouth Resuscitation" – 1:50
  - Tracks 25 to 36 are from an unreleased 1971 album, Radio John.
