= Hyde Park Art Center =

Arts organization in Chicago, Illinois, US

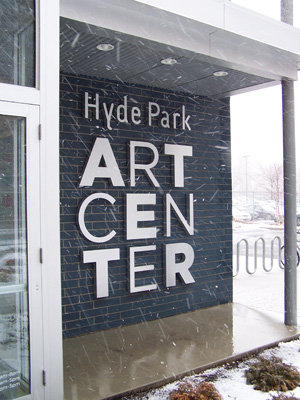
- Established: 1939 current location since 2006
- Location: 5020 South Cornell Avenue, Chicago, Illinois 60615; United States
- Coordinates: 41.8034°N 87.5868°W
- Director: Jen Trembly Chambers
- Public transit access: 1. 6 Jackson Park Express to E. Hyde Park Blvd. and Cornell Ave. or #28 Stony Island to E. Hyde Park Blvd. and Lake Park Ave. on the CTA; Metra Electric to 51st/53rd Street
- Website: www.hydeparkart.org

The Hyde Park Art Center (HPAC) is a visual arts organization and the oldest alternative exhibition space in the city of Chicago. Since 2006, HPAC has been located just north of Hyde Park Boulevard, at 5020 S.Cornell Avenue, in the Kenwood neighborhood of Chicago, Illinois.

== History ==
The Hyde Park Art Center was originally established in June 1939 as the Fifth Ward Art Center. In 1940, the name was changed to the Hyde Park Art Center. Its founders, who included future Senator Paul Douglas, consisted primarily of artists and volunteers committed to creating a neighborhood space for the visual arts. The Art Center's first home was a defunct saloon next door to then-alderman Douglas’ constituent office at 1466 E. 57th Street.

During and after World War II, HPAC was housed in a variety of locations, including a dance studio and an apartment building. It was forced to move often because of rent increases and gentrification, but continued to remain in the Hyde Park neighborhood.

In the early 1950s, Don Baum took charge of the Art Center's curatorial and educational departments. He was a gifted teacher and mentor to many artists who took classes with him at the art center. Famously, Baum cultivated the Art Center as an incubator and primary exhibition space for the Chicago Imagists, curating three of their seminal exhibitions, all entitled Hairy Who?, in 1966, 1967, and 1968.

In 1962, Ruth Horwich, an avid supporter of Chicago artists, joined the Art Center Board.

=== 2006 to Present ===
Exterior view of The Jackman Goldwasser Catwalk Gallery

The Hyde Park Art Center moved into its brand new facility on April 22, 2006. A ribbon cutting ceremony for the new space took place that day, attended by Mayor Richard M. Daley, and several local Chicago aldermen, followed by the grand opening gala that evening. The next weekend, the Art Center hosted an official public opening in the form of a 36-hour celebration called "Creative Move."

Located just a few blocks away from its former space in the Del Prado Apartments, the new building at 5020 S. Cornell Avenue is a 32,000 sq ft (3,000 m^{2}) space that more than tripled the Art Center's capacities, with more exhibition galleries and classroom spaces. The new building includes a 10-foot (3.0 m) by 80-foot (24 m) projection facade on the front of the building, a digital classroom, an Istria cafe, and 4833 rph, a resource space and gathering place for community members and creative individuals.

The Hyde Park Art Center celebrated its one-year anniversary in its new space with Creative Move Too, a 24-hour event in the space which once again brought in performers and organizations from around the city of Chicago, including the Jesse White Tumblers, Chicago Djembe Drumming Group, Blue Lotus Tribe Belly Dancers, and the McCormick Storybus. It also featured performances inside the Speaker Project, a performative sound installation by Juan Angel Chavez.

=== The Many Homes of the Hyde Park Art Center, 1939–Present ===
1939–1942: 1466 E. 57th Street
1942–1946: 1507 Cable Court
1946–1948: 5645 S. Harper Avenue
1948: 1540 E. 57th Street
1949–1956: 1506 E. 57th Street
1956: 1355 E. 55th Street
1957–1961: 1506 E. Hyde Park Boulevard
1961–1980: 5236 S. Blackstone Avenue
1980–2006: 1701 E. 53rd Street
2006–present: 5020 S. Cornell Avenue

== Architecture ==
The Hyde Park Art Center's current building was designed by internationally recognized Chicago architect Douglas Garofalo of Garofalo Architects. The new building was converted from an old Army warehouse leased indefinitely to HPAC by the University of Chicago for $1 a year. The total budget for the project was $3 million. Garofalo "was selected to design a building that would highlight accessibility between artists and the public, transparency of the process of art making and exhibiting, and encourage experimentation with technology and concepts." Two of the building's most notable architectural features function to both problematize and undermine the institutionalized boundaries, both tangible and intangible, that often exists between art organizations and the public: the first floor of the building includes "five metal garage-style doors that open up to the main gallery from the sidewalk," thus extending the gallery space into the street and allowing the public to enter the Art Center easily and at will; and the second floor features "a 10x80 foot glass facade ... outfitted with a system of high range projectors, computers, scrims and screens used primarily to show large-scale digital artworks," that can be viewed from both inside and outside the Art Center.

== Exhibitions ==
The Hyde Park Art Center primarily exhibits work by emerging or under-recognized contemporary artists living in Chicago. The Art Center does not maintain a permanent collection. The Art Center exhibited Leon Golub, Ed Paschke, Roger Brown, Ruth Duckworth, Juan Angel Chávez, Kerry James Marshall and Dawoud Bey early in their careers.

== Programs ==
Established in 1939, the center's mission has been to stimulate and sustain the vitality of the visual arts in Chicago. To fulfill this mission, the Center cultivates arts mentorships within the community it serves, fostering a collective spirit among artists, teachers and students, children and families, collectors, and the general public.

As one of the oldest alternative spaces in the city, HPAC has a long record of exhibiting a wide range of work by emerging artists. Panel discussions, gallery talks, poetry readings, music performances, open house events, and a series of short pieces by guest writers expand upon the approaches and ideas presented in each exhibition and engage a broad audience. In addition, the Art Center utilizes its exhibitions program to engage and teach school groups about contemporary art practices.

=== Education ===
The Hyde Park Art Center's educational programs serve both South Side neighborhoods and the Chicago area. Begun in 1940, HPAC's Oakman Clinton School and Studio Program has educated thousands of children and adults in ceramics, sculpture, painting, drawing, photography, stained glass, and other visual art practices in classes taught by professional artists.

=== Community Outreach ===
Participants at HPAC's monthly event Cocktails & Clay

The Hyde Park Art Center continually hosts a variety of events designed to introduce and engage different audiences in both the Art Center's current exhibitions and the larger world of contemporary art. Some of the Art Center's monthly events include:

- TalkingPoint - An informal discussion group for artists and the general public.
- Cocktails & Clay - Held on the second Friday, Cocktails & Clay seeks to introduce people to ceramics, their neighbors and the Art Center in a relaxed atmosphere that includes live DJs and a cash bar.
- Art Thing - An informal chat with a currently exhibiting artist held on the first Tuesday of every month.
- Second Sundays - A day of family-oriented art activities and performances held on the Second Sunday of every month.

==== Creative Move ====
Since the inauguration of its new building in 2006, the Hyde Park Art Center has hosted Creative Move, an annual 24-hour-long celebration of the visual and performing arts each April. This event, which is free and open to the public, attracts hundreds of people from Chicago and the surrounding suburbs. During Creative Move, the Art Center stays open for the entire night. The event typically begins on a Friday night and ends the following Saturday night.

- Creative Move (2006) took place over a 36-hour period from 9 am Saturday, April 29, 2006, until 9 pm Sunday, April 30, 2006. It featured the new building's inaugural exhibition, Takeover.
- Creative Move TOO (2007) took place from noon on Saturday, April 28, 2007, to noon on Sunday, April 29, 2007. It featured Juan Angel Chavez's Speaker Project.
- Creative Move: Moving Mountains (2008) took place from 8 pm on Friday, April 25, 2008, until 8 pm on Saturday, April 26, 2008. It featured the opening of Kelly Kaczynski's Olympus Manger,' Scene II and the on-site installation of Rebecca Keller's Victory Garden for a New Millennium.

== List of past exhibitions ==
=== 1997 ===
- ILLUMINATING: Light as Context, November 23 – December 17, 1997

=== 2000 ===
- Simparch: Free Basin, May 7 – June 24, 2000

=== 2001 ===
- Wedding Video: Projection, December 2–19, 2001
- Doug Ischar and Achim Wollscheid in conjunction with the Experimental Sound Studio's Outer Ear Festival, November 1 – 20, 2001
- The Autonomous Territories of Chicago, October 14, 2001
- Cold Comfort, August 25 – October 6, 2001
- HOMEGROWN KIDS, June, 10 – July 28, 2001
- Compound Fracture, March 25 – May 19, 2001

=== 2002 ===
- Cut, Pulled, Colored & Burnt, August 25 – October 5, 2002
- The Human Presence, May 5 – June 15, 2002
- Prestar=Borrow + Lend, March 10 – April 20, 2002
- Rupturing Beauty, January 13 – February 23, 2002

=== 2003 ===
- Not Just Another Pretty Face, November 9 – December 13, 2003
- Comix Chicago, August 24 – October 4, 2003
- Operation: Human Intelligence, May 4 – June 14, 2003
- Zounds, March 9 – April 19, 2003
- Patrick McGee: U7, January 12 – February 28, 2003

=== 2004 ===
- Administrative Bunker + Rook, January 11 – February 21, 2004

=== 2005 ===
- INterACTION, April 24 – June 11, 2005
- Robert Amft: Paintings for Particular People, March 6 – April 16, 2005
- The Wonderful (Lost) Achievements, January 16 – February 20, 2005

=== 2006 ===
- Converging Pattern, December 8 – 17, 2006
- Fraser Taylor: Reverse Transcriptase, November 13 –February 13, 2006
- Interstellar Low Ways, October 15 – January 14, 2007
- Le Conqueroo: Part 3. Defeat! Thus the Magpie, Rider of Leviathan, Herald of Saturn - the 9 choirs, October 15 – December 17, 2006
- Pathways to Unknown Worlds: Sun Ra, El Saturn & Chicago's Afro-Futurist Underground, 1954-68, October 1 – January 14, 2007
- John Himmelfarb: Inland Romance: Gary, Indiana, September 30 – December 17, 2006
- Just Good Art, September 18 – 30, 2006
- Doppelgänger, September 12 – October 12, 2006
- Wanna be part of the human race, September 3 – October 8, 2006
- Vera Scekic: Bilateral Symmetry, August 14 – November 4, 2006
- Mel Watkin: Reclamation, July 30 – August 27, 2006
- Ruby Satellite, July 16 – September 17, 2006
- Scott Wolniak: Drawing With Outer Space, July 15 – September 4, 2006
- Jennifer Greenburg: Recalling Americana, July 2 – September 10, 2006
- Home of the Free, June 25 – September 3, 2006
- Material Science, June 18 – July 23, 2006
- Mary Tepper: Citycape, May 15 – August 5, 2006
- Random Sky, April 24 – July 9, 2006
- Takeover, April 24 – June 11, 2006
- For Real, March 15 – April 28, 2006

=== 2007 ===
- Double Walkers: Transfigurations Thru Fashion, December 7 – 16, 2007
- Kariann Fuqua: On Unstable Ground, November 18, 2007 – February 9, 2008
- STANDARD(S), November 15 – 29, 2007
- Alice Shaddle: Fragments in a Fractured Space, November 4, 2007 – February 3, 2008
- Consuming War, November 4, 2007 – January 20, 2008, Gallery 1
- Impossible Violence: A History of Selves, October 27 – January 6, 2008
- Just Good Art 2007, October 8 – 20, 2007
- Figure, Form and Observation, September 23 – November 17, 2007
- Sandra Binion: Seasons, September 2 – November 2, 2007
- Plate Convergence, September 2 – November 11, 2007
- Another Story, August 12 – October 7, 2007
- Pedagogical Factory: Exploring Strategies for an Educated City, July 22 - September 23, 2007
- Constellation: A Faculty Show, July 15 - September 16, 2007
- Impart Process, June 17 - August 26, 2007
- Interiority, June 10 – July 29, 2007
- Selected Shots, May 20 -– June 24, 2007
- Stacza Lipinski: Hang Up, May 20 – September 16, 2007
- Bionic Threads, May 20 – June 24, 2007
- Speaker Project, April 28 – July 8, 2007
- THERE: University of Chicago MFA Thesis Exhibition, April 28, 2007
- Rise & Set, April 15 – November 2, 2007
- For Public Consumption, April 11 – May 27, 2007
- The Embedded Body, April 8 – May 27, 2007
- Exquisite Rivers: Artworks by Canter Middle School students, April 1 – June 3, 2007
- The Adventurous Type, March 18 – May 13, 2007
- A+ Videos, February 4 – April 15, 2007
- God's Punk, February 4 – April 8, 2007, 2007
- Luscious: Paintings by Darrell Roberts, January 21 – March 25, 2007
- Lorraine Peltz: Cosmic Hostess, January 14 – March 25, 2007
- Angela Lee: Marking the Body, January 7 – March 11, 2007
- Dale Washington: Sunrise, January 7 – March 11, 2007

==== CarianaCarianne Scandal ====
In 2007, the CarianaCarianne exhibition The Embedded Body, was prematurely closed after visitors to the Art Center repeatedly tampered with multiple megaphone recordings used in the collaborative installation. The Chicago alt-weekly NewCity named the ordeal one of the "Top 5 Chicago Art Scandals" of the year.

=== 2008 ===
- Elke Clause: As Above, So Below, November 2, 2008 – February 1, 2009
- Mark Booth: Spanish Still Life or A Large List of Merged Animals, October 26, 2008 – January 4, 2009
- Not Just Another Pretty Face, October 18, 2008 – January 17, 2009
- GLOW: work by photographers on faculty, August 3 – October 12, 2008
- Catherine Forster: They Call Me Theirs, August 3 – October 5, 2008
- Monica Herrera: Strings, July 27 – October 12, 2008
- Are We There Yet?, July 20 – September 28, 2008
- Kiss on the Cheek: Portraits by Dale Washington, July 6 – October 12, 2008
- Videodance: works from the Centre Pompidou, June 21 – July 20, 2008
- David Gista: Flamenco and Flames, June 21 – July 20, 2008
- Clothesline: Movement, June 21, 2008

David Lozano: Queer Interiors and Phthalo Blue, May 23 – November 18, 2008

- Selected Shots by Young Artists, May 4 – July 20, 2008
- Faster Cheaper Bolder, May 4 – July 27, 2008
- DIRTY: Work by Paul Nudd and Casey Wasniewski, May 4 – July 20, 2008
- Kelly Kaczynski: 'Olympus Manger', Scene II, April 27 – July 6, 2008
- Rebecca Keller: Victory Garden for the New Millennia, April 26 – September 15, 2008
- Jesse Seay: Mechanical Tide, April 25 – July 20, 2008
- Disinhibition: Black Art and Blue Humor, April 13 – June 22, 2008
- Howard Fonda: Nothing To Live Up To, February 17 – May 4, 2008
- Language Art, February 10 – April 27, 2008
- Chuck Walker: Through A Glass Darkly, February 3 – April 6, 2008
- Here's Looking At You Looking At Me Kid, February 3 – May 4, 2008
- Drive By, January 25 – April 20, 2008
- Soft Life, January 20 – March 30, 2008

=== 2011-2012 ===
- Bibiana Suárez, Memory/Memoría, December 11, 2011- March 25, 2012

== See also ==
- Chicago Imagists
- Roger Brown
- Ed Paschke
- Karl Wirsum
- Gladys Nilsson
- Robert Amft
- Thomas Kovachevich
- Bibiana Suárez
- Brandon Breaux
