= Bibiana Suárez =

Mixed media artist

- Born: 1960 (age 65–66); Mayagüez, Puerto Rico

Bibiana Suárez (born 1960) is a Latin American artist from Puerto Rico. She specializes in painting with mixed media. Her work reflects the immigrant experience of a search for self-identification and the problems of living on the edge between two cultures.

== Biography ==
Bibiana Suárez was born in Mayagüez, Puerto Rico. She spent her elementary school years in Guayama, Puerto Rico, an industrial town with mainland American companies. Suárez returned to Mayagüez to attend high school and then art school at the College of Mayagüez, which she attended for two years. In 1980, she moved to Chicago to keep pursuing her education at the School of the Art Institute of Chicago, where she earned a Bachelor of Fine Arts and Master of Fine Arts in Painting and Drawing. She has participated in solo and group exhibitions, exhibiting in Mexico, the United States, and Puerto Rico. Suárez is known for her installation of Memoria, which includes a pair matching Memory game of 108 mixed media paintings that discuss Latinization of U.S. culture. In her paintings and drawings, Suárez addresses psychological, political, and social conditions of the immigrant experience in the United States of America. Suárez is a Professor of Art in the Department of Art, Media, and Design at DePaul University in Chicago.

== Education ==
In 1989, Bibiana Suárez obtained her Master of Fine Arts in Painting and Drawing at the School of the Art Institute of Chicago. Previously, Suárez achieved in 1984 her Bachelor of Fine Arts in Painting and Drawing, at the same institution where she achieved her master's degree, the School of the Art Institute of Chicago.

== Artworks ==
=== De Pico a Pico (Beak to Beak) ===
Created in 1993, the artwork was made using pastel and charcoal on paper, which measures 74x84 in. Two roosters are illustrated in challenging positions from one another. One bird reflects a healthy, fat, and feathered rooster. In opposition, the other rooster is solely sketched as a skeleton. Despite their differences in appearance, they both are beak to beak at the same angle. The intent of the image is to portray the power struggles of Puerto Rico and the United States. The United States is presented as the healthy and dominating rooster, yet the weakened rooster is Puerto Rico but courageously continues to face the conqueror despite its setbacks.

=== Frito Bandito at the Water Hole no.1 ===
This illustration was made with the medium of archival inkjet print. The back scenery has mountains, cowboys, horses, and yellow fields. On the dirt, the cowboys are laying down with their rifles in hand and the horses stand to the back of them. Frito Lay hangs upside down at the top of the illustration, where he is smiling and has one hand directing straight and the other folded. Frito Lay is drawn in black and white. The intent of the image illustrates a more positive image of being immigrant in which there was a time the thought of having immigrants was great.

=== Lactating Breast ===
From 1997 to 1998, this art piece contains the media of IRIA digital print on paper and flashe paint, prisma color, and graphite. The background of the painting is a breast, where inside of the breast an image of a half Jesus and half an Uncle Sam are illustrated. Their faces and body are half and half of each. The surrounding is painted royal blue. Suarez, as seen with previous works of hers depicting being part of two cultures, connects political and psychological issues, by using religion and a past U.S. president.

=== Rio de Agua Viva (River of Live Water) ===
The painting measures 84 by 61 inches. With a single palm tree, an island is painted. The background is red in company of the waving of lines that represent giant jellyfish surrounding the island. Suárez claims the island represents Puerto Rico by being invisible, dispensable, and ignored by the United States. The painting was part of the exhibition "In Search of an Island".

=== Wounded Heart ===
Dating from 2005 to 2011, the above artwork used the medium of acrylic paint and laser transfer. The art piece's background is a bright green, with the number 27 in the top right corner. In the center, the heart is illustrated with bright colors of yellow, red, blue, and light pink. The heart is wounded with blood gushing out. El Corazon (The Heart) is written at the bottom left corner. The intent of this piece reflects on the broader issue of acceptance and welcome as an immigrant.

== Exhibitions ==
=== Solo ===
- Domino/Domíno at El Museo del Barrio, New York (1998) and Illinois Art Gallery, Chicago (1999)
- Island Adrift: The Puerto Rican Identity in Exile at Taller Puertorriqueño, Philadelphia (1993)
- Memory/Memoría at the Hyde Park Art Center, Chicago, Illinois (2011-2012)
- Beak to Beak- Face to Face at Sazama Gallery, Chicago, Illinois (1993)
- In Search of an Island at Sazama Gallery, Chicago, Illinois (1991)
- A Grafito at Art Students League, San Juan, Puerto Rico (1985)

=== Group ===
- Puerto Rican Equation at Hunter College, New York (1998)
- Expresiones Hispanas begins at Mexican Cultural Institute in San Antonio, Texas (1988-1989)
- 1898 DIWA Arts at Bronx Museum of the Arts, New York (1998)
- Second Sight: Printmaking at Mary Leigh Block Gallery of Northwestern University, Chicago, Illinois (1996)
- National Drawing Invitational at the Arkansas Art Center in Little Rock (1992)
- In the Heart of the Country at the Chicago Cultural Center (1991)
- Advina! Chicago Latino Expressions at Mexican Fine Arts Museum, Chicago, Illinois and Museum of Modern Art in Chapultepec, Mexico City (1998)

== Collections ==
- Arkansas Art Center in Little Rock, Arkansas
- DePaul Art Museum in Chicago, Illinois
- Maria de Los Angeles Torres and Mathew Piers at Chicago, IL
- Public Art Collection at Harold Washington and Humboldt Park Public Libraries in the city of Chicago, Illinois
- The Mary and Leigh Block Gallery at Northwestern University in Chicago

== Honors and awards ==
In autumn of 2011 at DePaul University, Suárez was a faculty fellow at the Center for Latino Research. She won the Illinois Arts Council Individual Visual Artist Fellowships Awards three times, in the years of 1991, 1994, and 1999. The Arts Midwest/NEA Regional Visual Arts Fellowship was awarded to her in 2012 and for 2003-2004 in the Center for study of Race, Politics, and Culture at the University of Chicago, she was the inaugural recipient artist in the residence fellowship.

== Publications ==
Based on a section of an exhibition of Antonio Martorell's work at the Institute for Puerto Rican Art and Culture, Bibiana Suárez published the "Culture Vulture" in the Chicago Reader. She also produced an essay and reproductions of work from the Memory series that were included in Dialogo, volume 15 in 2012, at the Journal of the Center for Latino Research, in DePaul University.
