= Morning Bugle =

Studio album by John Hartford
- Released: June 1972
- Recorded: 1972
- Studio: Bearsville, Bearsville, New York
- Genre: Bluegrass
- Length: 41:20
- Label: Warner Bros.
- Producer: John Simon

John Hartford chronology
Aereo-Plain (1971)	Morning Bugle (1972)	Mark Twang (1976)

Morning Bugle is a bluegrass album by American musician John Hartford. It was released in 1972 by Warner Bros. Records.

== Production ==
Morning Bugle is Hartford's second and final album for Warner Bros. Records and was recorded at Bearsville Studios in Bearsville, New York. The music was all written by Hartford. The album features jazz bassist Dave Holland, who performs with both Hartford and Norman Blake for the very first time.

== Reception ==
Professional ratings
Review scores
Source	Rating
AllMusic	4.5/5 stars

Writing for AllMusic, critic Jim Worbois called the album "One of Hartford's finest records. Done mostly live in the studio with virtually no over-dubs, this is a fine collection of song covering a variety of subjects."

In a contemporary review, William J. Knittle Jr. of the Northeast Star-Review spoke positively of Morning Bugle, calling it "possibly the best album John Hartford [had] ever recorded".

== Track listing ==
All tracks composed by John Hartford; except where indicated.

1. "Streetcar" – 3:54
2. "Nobody Eats at Linebaugh's Anymore" – 4:52
3. "Howard Hughes' Blues" – 2:52
4. "All Fall Down" – 3:11
5. "On the Road" – 3:44
6. "Morning Bugle" – 2:22
7. "Old Joe Clark" – 5:48
8. "My Rag" – 3:40
9. "Late Last Night When My Willie Came Home" (Traditional) – 3:19
10. "Got No Place to Go" – 4:18
11. "Bye-Bye" – 3:20

== Personnel ==
- John Hartford - banjo, guitar, violin, vocals
- Norman Blake - guitar, mandolin
- Dave Holland - bass

== Production ==
- Producer, Liner Notes: John Simon
- Recording Engineer: Mark Harman
- Mixing (CD Edition): Toby Mountain
- Cover Illustration: Don Punchatz
- Photography, Art Direction: Ed Thrasher
