= John Hartford =

American singer-songwriter and musician (1937–2001)

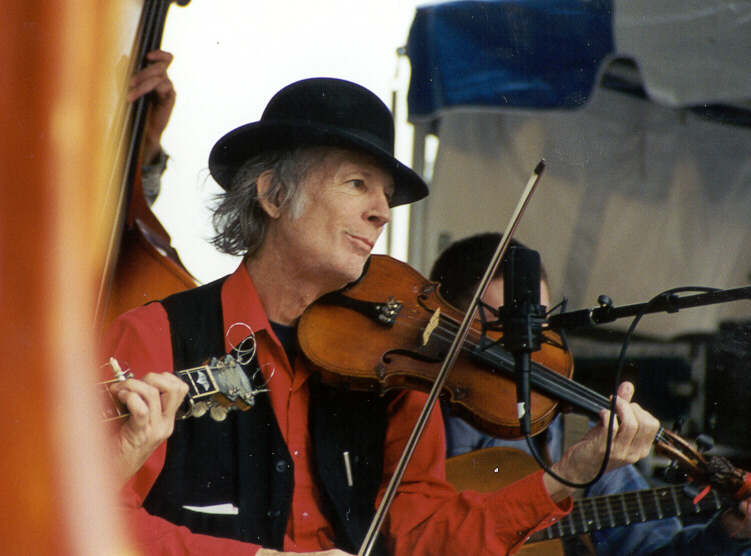
- Hartford at MerleFest, 2000

Background information
- Born: John Cowan Harford; December 30, 1937; New York City, New York
- Origin: St. Louis, Missouri
- Died: June 4, 2001 (aged 63) Nashville, Tennessee
- Genres: Progressive country; old-time
- Occupations: Singer-songwriter; instrumentalist; dancer; towboat and steamboat pilot
- Instruments: Banjo; fiddle; guitar; mandolin; vocals
- Years active: 1953–2001
- Labels: RCA; Warner Bros.; Flying Fish; Rounder; Small Dog a'Barkin'
- Website: johnhartford.com

John Cowan Hartford (December 30, 1937 – June 4, 2001) was an American folk, country, and bluegrass composer and musician known for his mastery of the fiddle and banjo, as well as for his witty lyrics, unique vocal style, and extensive knowledge of Mississippi River lore. His most successful song is "Gentle on My Mind", which won three Grammy Awards and was listed in "BMI's Top 100 Songs of the Century". Hartford performed with a variety of ensembles throughout his career, and is perhaps best known for his solo performances where he would interchange the guitar, banjo, and fiddle from song to song. He also invented his own shuffle tap dance move, and clogged on an amplified piece of plywood while he played and sang.

He was posthumously inducted into the International Bluegrass Music Hall of Fame in 2010.

== Early life ==
Harford (he changed his name to Hartford later in life on the advice of Chet Atkins) was born on December 30, 1937, in New York City to parents Carl and Mary Harford. He spent his childhood in St. Louis, Missouri, where he was exposed to the influence that shaped much of his career and music: the Mississippi River. From the time he got his first job on the river, at age 16, Hartford was on, around, or singing about the river.

His early musical influences came from the broadcasts of the Grand Ole Opry and included Earl Scruggs, nominal inventor of the three-finger bluegrass style of banjo playing. Hartford said often that the first time he heard Earl Scruggs pick the banjo, it changed his life. By age 13, Hartford was an accomplished old-time fiddler and banjo player, and he soon learned to play guitar and mandolin as well. Hartford performed with his first bluegrass band while attending John Burroughs School, a local private high school.

After high school, he enrolled at Washington University in St. Louis, completed four years of a commercial arts program and dropped out to focus on music; however, he did receive a degree in 1960. He immersed himself in the local music scene, working as a DJ, playing in bands, and occasionally recording singles for local labels.

== Music career ==
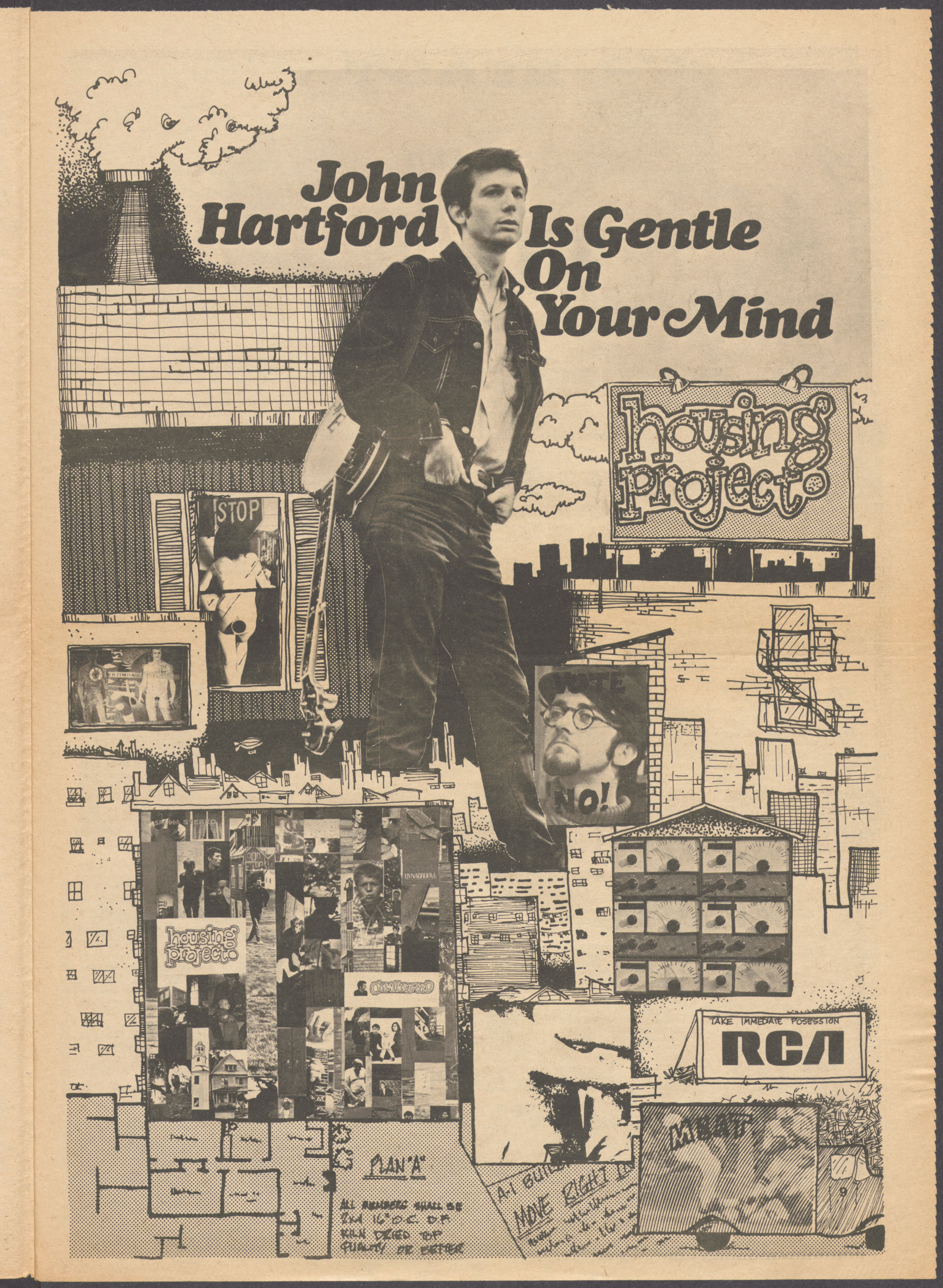
Full-page ad for the 1968 album Housing Project.

In 1965, he moved to Nashville, Tennessee, the center of the country music industry. In 1966, he signed with RCA Victor and produced his first album, Looks at Life, in the same year.

In 1967, Hartford's second album Earthwords & Music spawned his first major songwriting hit, "Gentle on My Mind". His recording of the song was only a modest success, but it caught the notice of Glen Campbell, who recorded his own version, which gave the song much wider publication. At the 1968 Grammys, the song netted four awards, two of which went to Hartford. It became one of the most widely recorded country songs of all time, and the royalties it brought in allowed Hartford great financial independence; Hartford later said that the song bought his freedom.

As his popularity grew, he moved to the West Coast, where he became a regular on The Smothers Brothers Comedy Hour; other television appearances followed, as did recording appearances with several major country artists. Hartford played banjo and sang the vocal harmonies on the Guthrie Thomas song "I'll be Lucky". He also played with The Byrds on their album Sweetheart of the Rodeo.

His success on the Smothers Brothers series was enough that Hartford was offered the lead role in a TV detective series, but he turned it down to move back to Nashville and concentrate on music. He also was a regular on The Glen Campbell Goodtime Hour (as the banjo picker who would stand up from his seat in the audience to begin the theme music) and The Johnny Cash Show.

He played the Philadelphia Folk Festival 11 times between 1969 and 2001. In live performances, John Hartford was a true one-man band; he used several stringed instruments and a variety of props such as plywood squares and boards with sand and gravel for flatfoot dancing.

=== Newgrass ===
Hartford recorded four more albums for RCA from 1968 to 1970: The Love Album, Housing Project, John Hartford, and Iron Mountain Depot. In 1971, he moved to Warner Bros. Records, where he was given more freedom to record in his nontraditional style, fronting a band that included Vassar Clements, Tut Taylor, and Norman Blake. He recorded several albums that set the tone of his later career, including Aereo-Plain and Morning Bugle. Sam Bush said, "Without Aereo-Plain (and the Aereo-Plain band), there would be no newgrass music."

He switched to the Flying Fish label several years later and continued to experiment with nontraditional country and bluegrass styles. Among his recordings were two albums in 1977 and 1980 with Doug and Rodney Dillard from The Dillards, with Sam Bush as a backing musician and featuring a diversity of songs that included "Boogie On Reggae Woman" and "Yakety Yak". Hartford's Grammy-winning Mark Twang features Hartford playing solo, reminiscent of his live solo performances playing the fiddle, guitar, banjo, and amplified plywood for tapping his feet. At the same time, he developed a stage show, which toured in various forms from the mid 1970s until shortly before his death.

Hartford changed recording labels several more times during his career; in 1991, he inaugurated his own Small Dog a'Barkin' label. Later in the 1990s, he switched again to Rounder Records. He recorded a number of idiosyncratic records on Rounder, many of which recalled earlier forms of folk and country music. Among them was the 1999 album Retrograss recorded with Mike Seeger and David Grisman, with bluegrass versions of "(Sittin' on) the Dock of the Bay", "Maybellene", "When I'm Sixty-Four", and "Maggie's Farm".

He recorded several songs for the soundtrack to the movie O Brother, Where Art Thou?, winning another Grammy for his performance. He made his final tour in 2000 with the Down from the Mountain tour that grew out of that movie and its accompanying album. While performing in Texas in April, he found that he could no longer control his hands due to non-Hodgkin lymphoma, which ended his life two months later.

Hartford is considered a co-founder of the newgrass movement, although he remained deeply attached to traditional music as well. His last band and last few albums reflect his love for pre-bluegrass old-time music.

== Steamboating ==
The culture of the Mississippi River and its steamboats captivated Hartford from an early age. He said that it would have been his life's work "but music got in the way", so he intertwined them whenever possible. In the '70s, Hartford earned his steamboat pilot's license, which he used to keep close to the river he loved; for many years, he worked as a pilot on the steamboat Julia Belle Swain during the summers. He also worked as a towboat pilot on the Mississippi, Illinois, and Tennessee Rivers.

During his later years, he came back to the river every summer. "Working as a pilot is a labor of love", he said. "After a while, it becomes a metaphor for a whole lot of things, and I find for some mysterious reason that if I stay in touch with it, things seem to work out all right". His home in Madison, Tennessee, was situated on a bend of the Cumberland River and built to simulate the view from a steamboat deck. He used to talk to the boat captains by radio as their barges crawled along the river. That bend of the Cumberland River, known as "Hartford's Bend" or "John Hartford Point", is denoted on official navigational charts with the "John Hartford Light".

An accomplished fiddler and banjo player, Hartford was simultaneously an innovative voice on the country scene and a reminder of a vanished era. Along with his own compositions, such as "Long Hot Summer Days" and "Kentucky Pool", Hartford was a repository of old river songs, calls, and stories. His song "Let Him Go on Mama" from Mark Twang was inspired by retired Streckfus Steamers musician (and later chief engineer of the steamboat Delta Queen) Mike O'Leary. Hartford was also the author of Steamboat in a Cornfield, a children's book that recounts the true story of the Ohio River steamboat The Virginia and its beaching in a cornfield.

== Final years and legacy ==
Between 1995 and 2001, Brandon Ray Kirk and he co-authored a biography of blind fiddler Ed Haley. Hartford's album The Speed of the Old Longbow is a collection of Haley's tunes. Writer and arts administrator Art Menius profiled Hartford in the Academia journal article, "John Hartford as I Knew Him", saying "John connected not just words to music, but the old days of Nashville to its present, tradition to innovation, new grass to bluegrass to old-time, television to radio, river to shore, aging musicians to hippies. Goethe may have been the last person to know everything worth knowing, but John Hartford tried." Hartford also provided voice acting for the Ken Burns' documentary series Baseball and The Civil War.

From the 1980s onwards, Hartford had non-Hodgkins lymphoma. He died of the disease at Centennial Medical Center in Nashville, on June 4, 2001, at age 63. He is interred at Spring Hill Cemetery in Nashville, Tennessee. Hartford was given a star on the St. Louis Walk of Fame in honor of his work. He also was given a posthumous president's award by the Americana Music Association in September 2005. The annual John Hartford Memorial Festival was held in southern Indiana from 2011 to 2019 and in 2022.

Hartford acknowledged that the royalties he earned from "Gentle" allowed him to live the life he wanted as a musician, author, folklorist and steamboat pilot. The Financial Times commented that "his song about freedom ensured his own freedom."

== Personal life ==
Hartford was initially married to Betty. The couple divorced in 1970, and he was later married to Marie, who survived him. He had a son and daughter.

== Works ==
Hartford recorded more than 30 albums, ranging across a broad spectrum of styles, from the traditional country of his early RCA recordings, to the new and experimental sound of his early newgrass recordings, to the traditional folk style to which he often returned later in his life. Hartford's albums also vary widely in formality, from the stately and orderly Annual Waltz to the rougher and less cut recordings that typified many of his later albums.

Aereo-Plain and Morning Bugle are often considered to be Hartford's most influential works, coming as they did at the beginning of a period in which artists such as Hartford and the New Grass Revival, led by Sam Bush, would create a new form of country music, blending their country backgrounds with influences from a number of other sources. His later years had a number of live albums, as well as recordings that explored the repertoire of old-time folk music. He sketched the cover art for some of his midcareer albums, drawing with both hands simultaneously.

Hartford is also a published author, including 1971's collection of poetry Word Movies and 1986's Steamboat in a Cornfield, a poetic retelling of a steamboat running aground along the Ohio River.

== In popular culture ==
His song "This Eve of Parting", from the 1968 album The Love Album, was featured in the 2017 movie Lady Bird, portions being heard at two different points in the film.

Cartoonist Jim Scancarelli was a fan, and mentioned Hartford several times in his strip Gasoline Alley. In 1991, a flood washes up a steamboat carrying Hartford; in 1998, he played at Rufus and Melba's wedding reception; and in 2002, when Skeezix and Slim are lost in a cemetery, Hartford's gravestone is seen.

The third track on the album A Tear in the Eye Is a Wound in the Heart by the band Black Prairie, of Portland, Oregon, is entitled "For the Love of John Hartford", an instrumental.

== Discography ==
Awards
Preceded by Carter Family	AMA presidents Award; 2005	Succeeded by Mickey Newbury
