= Earthwords & Music =

Earthwords and Music

Studio album by John Hartford
- Released: 1967
- Genre: Folk, country, novelty
- Label: RCA Victor
- Producer: Felton Jarvis

John Hartford chronology
Looks at Life (1967)	Earthwords and Music (1967)	The Love Album (1968)

Alternative cover
- 2002 BMG Re-issue

Earthwords and Music is John Hartford's second LP, released in 1967. Like all of his RCA recordings, it was reissued in 2002 as part of a "twofer" CD, combined with his first album, Looks at Life.

The album includes Hartford's Grammy-winning hit song, "Gentle on My Mind".

== Reception ==
Professional ratings
Review scores
Source	Rating
Allmusic	3/5 stars
Allmusic	3/5 stars

After noting some of the musical novelty songs of the album, music critic Jim Worbois, writing for Allmusic, wrote "Also contains some fine straight songs. Good stuff."

== Track listing ==
All songs by John Hartford.

1. "Good Old Electric Washing Machine" – 2:08
2. "Love Song in 2/4 Time" – 1:38
3. "Daytime of Life" – 5:22
4. "Whose That?" – 1:52
5. "There Are No Fools in Heaven" – 4:30
6. "Earthwords" – 1:43
7. "Gentle on My Mind" – 3:05
8. "Naked in Spite of Myself" – 3:09
9. "How Come You're Being So Good to Me" – 2:05
10. "No End of Love" – 3:21
11. "Left Handed Woman" – 1:39
12. "Baking Soda" – 1:28
