= John Hartford (album) =

Studio album by John Hartford
- Released: 1969
- Genre: Folk, country, novelty
- Label: RCA Victor
- Producer: Felton Jarvis

John Hartford chronology
Housing Project (1968)	John Hartford (1969)	Iron Mountain Depot (1970)

Alternative cover
- 2002 BMG Re-issue

John Hartford is John Hartford's fifth album, released in 1969. It reached number 137 on the Billboard 200. Like all of his RCA recordings, it was reissued in 2002. in the reissue package, John Hartford is combined with his sixth album, Iron Mountain Depot, and a seventh unreleased album of RCA material, Radio John.

== Reception ==
Professional ratings
Review scores
Source	Rating
AllMusic	4/5 stars
Robert Christgau	D+

Stewart Mason, for AllMusic, wrote, "RCA probably thought they were just signing the guy who wrote 'Gentle on My Mind' when they signed John Hartford back in 1966, but his own albums just kept getting stranger and stranger during the late '60s, culminating in this bizarre piece of orchestrated country-tinged art rock from 1969." Robert Christgau wrote, "Hartford is an engaging singer and an excellent songwriter, but the production and arrangements on this record are criminal ... and the material very thin."

== Track listing ==
All tracks written by John Hartford.

=== 1969 release ===
1. "Dusty Miller Hornpipe and Fugue in A Major for Strings, Brass and 5-String Banjo" – 2:12
2. "I've Heard That Tearstained Monologue You Do There By the Door Before You Go" – 3:48
3. "The Collector" – 3:21
4. "A Short Sentimental Interlude" – 1:08
5. "Mr. Jackson's Got Nothing to Do" – 2:44
6. "Open Rode Ode" – 2:32
7. "Little Piece in D" – 2:52
8. "The Poor Old Prurient Interest Blues" – 2:45
9. "The Wart" – 0:59
10. "Railroad Street" – 2:19
11. "Another Short (But Not So Sentimental) Interlude" – 0:43
12. "Orphan of World War II" – 2:43
13. "The Little Old Lonesome Little Circle Song" – 1:49
14. "I Didn't Know the World Would Last This Long" – 3:52

=== 2002 release ===
All tracks written by John Hartford, except where noted.

1. "Dusty Miller Hornpipe and Fugue in A Major for Strings, Brass and 5-String Banjo" – 2:12
2. "I've Heard That Tearstained Monologue You Do There By the Door Before You Go" – 3:48
3. "The Collector" – 3:21
4. "A Short Sentimental Interlude" – 1:08
5. "Mr. Jackson's Got Nothing to Do" – 2:44
6. "Open Rode Ode" – 2:32
7. "Little Piece in D" – 2:52
8. "The Poor Old Prurient Interest Blues" – 2:45
9. "The Wart" – 0:59
10. "Railroad Street" – 2:19
11. "Another Short (But Not So Sentimental) Interlude" – 0:43
12. "Orphan of World War II" – 2:43
13. "The Little Old Lonesome Little Circle Song" – 1:49
14. "I Didn't Know The World Would Last This Long" – 3:52
  - Tracks 1 to 14 originally appeared on the 1969 release John Hartford.
15. "Like Unto a Mockingbird" – 2:12
16. "Meanwhile You Sit by My Banjo" – 3:48
17. "I Won't Know Why I Went Till After I Get Back" – 3:21
18. "Maybe" – 1:08
19. "Go Home Girl" – 2:44
20. "Natural to Be Gone" – 2:32
21. "Before They Tow My Car Away" – 2:52
22. "To Say" – 2:45
23. "Frustrated Bird" – 0:59
24. "Hey Jude" (John Lennon, Paul McCartney) – 2:19
  - Tracks 15 to 24 appeared on the original 1970 release of Iron Mountain Depot.
25. "Skippin' in the Mississippi Dew" – 2:28
26. "Self Made Man" – 3:53
27. "In Tall Buildings" – 3:12
28. "And the Band Played On" – 4:07
29. "Orange Blossom Special" (Ervin T. Rouse) – 5:48
30. "Bed on My Mind" – 3:29
31. "Waugh Paugh" – 4:48
32. "White Lightning" (J. P. Richardson) – 4:00
33. "Sunshine Lady, You Really Know How to Slow a Man Down" – 3:20
34. "I Don't Love Nobody" – 5:21
35. "California Earthquake" – 3:04
36. "Mouth to Mouth Resuscitation" – 1:50
  - Tracks 25 to 36 are from an unreleased 1971 album, Radio John.
