= Gentle on My Mind =

1967 song by John Hartford

Single by John Hartford

from the album Earthwords & Music
- B-side: "(Good Old Electric) Washing Machine (Circa. 1943)"
- Released: May 1967
- Studio: RCA Studio A, Nashville, Tennessee
- Genre: Country
- Length: 3:03
- Label: RCA
- Songwriter: John Hartford
- Producer: Felton Jarvis

John Hartford singles chronology
"Gentle on My Mind" (1967)	"Natural to Be Gone" (1969)

"Gentle on My Mind" is a song that was written and originally recorded by John Hartford, and released on his second studio album, Earthwords & Music (1967). Hartford wrote the song after watching Doctor Zhivago in 1966, as he was inspired by the film and his own personal experiences. The lyrics describe the reminiscences of lost love of a man as he travels through the country. An obituary for Hartford indicated that the lyrics are "about a hobo reminiscing about a lost love". The following year, Hartford released the song as a single on RCA Records.

It then caught the attention of Glen Campbell, who recorded his version, just a month later in June 1967, with a group of session musicians known as the Wrecking Crew, of which he had been a part. Campbell's recording of "Gentle on My Mind" peaked in the top 30 on Billboard's Hot Country Singles chart. In 1968, Hartford and Campbell each won two Grammy Awards for the song.

"Gentle on My Mind" was later recorded by other singers, including Dean Martin, Aretha Franklin, Frank Sinatra and Elvis Presley. It was also translated into other languages. In 2014, a recording of the song by the Band Perry earned a Grammy Award for Best Country Duo/Group Performance. Taking into account all recorded versions of the song, it has become the second-most-played song on the radio in the United States according to BMI.

== Writing and original recording ==
In 1966, John Hartford was living with his wife and son in a trailer in Nashville, Tennessee. One night, the couple saw the film Doctor Zhivago at a local theater. Inspired by the love story depicted in the film between Yuri Zhivago and Lara Antipova, Hartford returned home and wrote "Gentle on my Mind" in between twenty and thirty minutes. The story of the song narrates the reminiscences of a drifter of his lost love, while moving through backroads and hobo encampments. Betty Hartford, who later divorced her husband, noted to him the similarity between herself and the song's female character. She questioned John Hartford about the man's regret for his marriage. Hartford said he likened her to Lara and attributed the man's feelings about being trapped in a relationship to his "artistic license".

Hartford defined the finished song as a "word movie" and described his writing process as "thinking in pictures, like paintings using words and sound". In a 1980 interview, Hartford commented he was still unsure of the song's meaning and that its message will be interpreted differently by listeners. Twelve years later, Hartford again attributed his inspiration to start writing the song to Doctor Zhivago, and said the content was a result of his personal experience. Hartford said the song "just came real fast, a blaze, a blur". He described the song as a banjo tune without a chorus, and with a variety of words he deemed "hard to sing" because it "violated the principles of songwriting".

At the time, Hartford worked as a disc jockey on the radio station WSIX and for the publishing company Tompall & the Glaser Brothers. Hartford recorded a demo and delivered it to Chuck Glaser, who took the demo to Chet Atkins of RCA Records. According to Harford, after writing "Gentle on My Mind", he did not intend to record the song himself. Hartford sent the demos of "Gentle on My Mind" and a second song to sell them, but instead the label decided to offer Hartford a recording contract. Atkins then suggested to the songwriter to use "Hartford" instead of his surname "Harford" as a professional name. Hartford recorded "Gentle on my Mind" and its flipside "Washing Machine", both of which were produced by Felton Jarvis. The single was released in May 1967. RCA, however, decided not to promote Hartford's recording because they did not consider it to be a country song. Cashbox listed the single under their "Best Bets"; the magazine forecasted in a review that Hartford could get "heaps of spins" with his "poetic folk-country-flavored ballad". "Gentle on My Mind" peaked at number 60 on Billboard's Hot Country Songs.

== Glen Campbell's recording and success ==
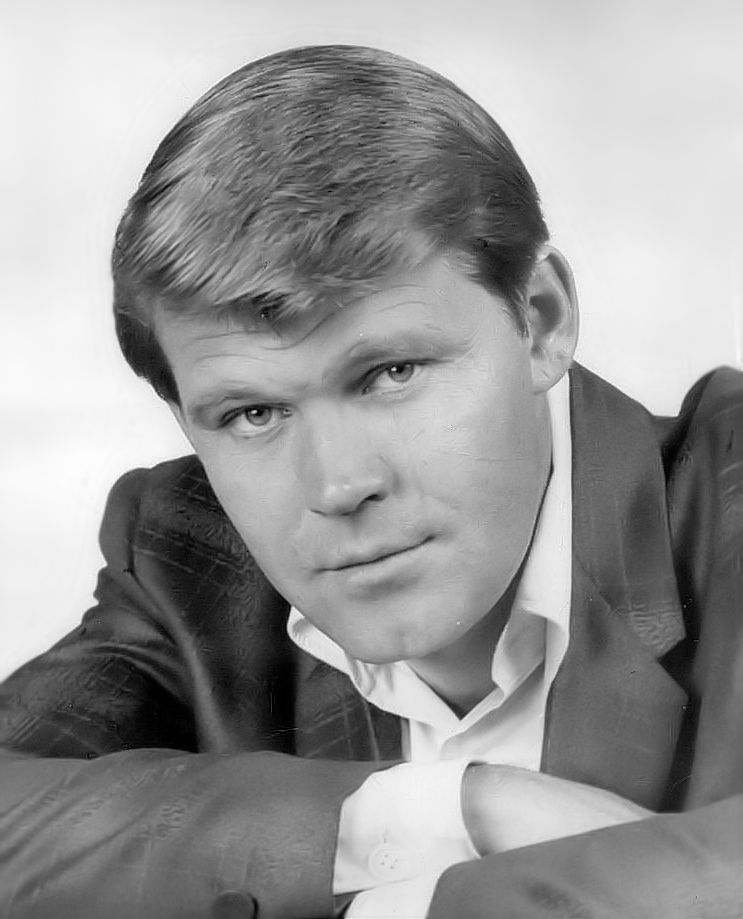
Glen Campbell pictured in 1967

Hartford's recording of "Gentle on my Mind" attracted Glen Campbell's attention after he heard it on the radio and bought the single. He felt the song is "an essay on life" and was "knocked out" by the scenery it describes. At the time, Campbell worked as a studio musician with The Wrecking Crew; he rearranged the song with a faster tempo than Hartford's version. The band recorded a demo at Capitol Studios. Campbell left the demo tape at the studio for producer Al De Lory, who made slight production arrangements that Capitol Records accepted as a master for the single. Campbell's recording of "Gentle on My Mind" was released with "Just Another Man" on the B-side in June 1967. Upon its release, Billboard predicted the single would reach the Billboard Hot 100 chart. It peaked at number 30 on the magazine's Hot Country Songs, and at number 62 on the Hot 100. The success of the song, which was originally intended for the country music market, helped Campbell cross over to the pop market.

"Gentle on My Mind"
Beginning of Campbell's version

After Campbell's success with "By the Time I Get to Phoenix", "Gentle on My Mind" was re-released in 1968. The new release of the single sold more copies than the original release, peaking at number 44 on Billboard's Hot Country Singles, at number 39 on the Billboard Hot 100, and at number 8 on the Easy Listening chart. On the RPM charts in Canada, it peaked at number 20 on the country chart and at number 60 on the RPM 100. That year, "Gentle on My Mind" won the categories for Best Country & Western Song, Best Folk Performance for Hartford's recording; and Best Country & Western Solo Vocal Performance, Male as well as Best Country & Western Recording for Campbell's version at the 10th Annual Grammy Awards.

By May 1968, an estimated fifty singers had recorded "Gentle on my Mind", while Campbell's recording had sold 600,000 copies. The song was recorded by such singers as Frank Sinatra (1968), Dean Martin (1969), Aretha Franklin (1969), and Elvis Presley (1969). Patti Page quickly recorded her late 1967 version which reached number 7 on Billboard's Easy Listening Chart in 1968, and number 66 on the Hot 100. Aretha Franklin's version was released as the B-side to her single "I Can't See Myself Leaving You"; her version peaked at number 76 on the Billboard Hot 100 and at number 50 on the Billboard Hot Rhythm & Blues Singles chart. Dean Martin's version reached number 2 on the UK Singles chart, number 3 on the Irish Singles chart, and number 9 on Billboard's Easy Listening chart. Hartford's producer on the original recording of "Gentle on My Mind", Felton Jarvis, co-produced Presley's album From Elvis in Memphis (1969) with Chips Moman. The recording of Hartford's song was the last number of Presley's January 14, 1969, session. Following its second take, Presley experienced laryngitis and had to temporarily halt the recording.

The success of the song drew some opposition to its themes. Columnist and Catholic clergyman Jerome LeDoux said that the song's "catchy, simple melody combines with nice-sounding, immoral lyrics which no one really pays attention to, and which is therefore passed off as something decent".

=== Personnel ===
According to the AFM contract sheet.

- Glen Campbell - lead vocals, guitar
- James Burton - guitar
- Douglas Dillard - banjo
- Leon Russell - piano
- Joe Osborn - bass guitar
- Jim Gordon - drums, maracas

== Legacy ==
Hartford said the success of "Gentle on My Mind" allowed him to become a full-time songwriter without working as a disc jockey. The song's success also caught the attention of Tom Smothers, who in 1968 invited Hartford to become a part of The Smothers Brothers Comedy Hour on CBS. The same year, Campbell performed "Gentle on My Mind" as the theme song of his own CBS show The Glen Campbell Goodtime Hour.

In 1970, Claude François recorded the song in French under the title "Si douce à mon souvenir". Fourteen years later, Brazilian singer Roberto Carlos wrote the song "Caminhoneiro" ("Trucker") in Portuguese using the melody of "Gentle on My Mind." In 1985, Puerto Rican salsa singer Frankie Ruiz released a Spanish-language version of "Caminhoneiro" entitled "El Camionero".

Hartford donated the manuscript of "Gentle on My Mind" to the Country Music Hall of Fame and Museum in 1982. By 1984, the song had played on radio over four million times in the United States, and became the best-selling song of Broadcast Music, Inc.'s (BMI) catalog. In 1987, the estimated number of plays grew to 4.4 million and 400 versions had been recorded. At the time, Hartford refused the use of the song for commercials and parodies.

In 1990, BMI listed Campbell's version of "Gentle on My Mind" as the fourth-most-played song in the history of radio in the US. It appeared at number 71 on Country America magazine's 1992 list of the Top 100 Country Songs of All Time, while BMI placed the version at number 16 on its 1999 list of Top 100 Songs of the Century. By 2001, with six million plays, the song became the second-most-played on the radio in the US, behind the Beatles' "Yesterday".

In 2008, the 1967 recording of "Gentle on My Mind" by Glen Campbell on Capitol Records was inducted into the Grammy Hall of Fame. In 2014, the Band Perry recorded a version of the song for the documentary Glen Campbell: I'll Be Me; the cover won the category for Best Country Duo/Group Performance at the 57th Annual Grammy Awards in 2015, and peaked at number 29 on Billboard's Country Airplay and at number 35 on the Hot Country Songs. In August 2017, following Campbell's death, sales of his hit singles increased by 6,000%. The digital downloads figure for "Gentle on My Mind" registered 3,000 and increased the track's total sales at the time to 251,000.

In June 2026, CBS News included the song in its list of the 250 essential American songs of the past 250 years.

== Accolades ==
Awards for "Gentle on My Mind"
Year	Organization	Award	Artist	Result	Ref.
1968	10th Annual Grammy Awards	Best Country & Western Song	John Hartford	Won	
1968	10th Annual Grammy Awards	Best Folk Performance	John Hartford	Won	
1968	10th Annual Grammy Awards	Best Country & Western Solo Vocal Performance, Male	Glen Campbell	Won	
1968	10th Annual Grammy Awards	Best Country & Western Recording	Glen Campbell	Won	
2008	The Recording Academy	Grammy Hall of Fame	Glen Campbell	Inducted	
2015	57th Annual Grammy Awards	Best Country Duo/Group Performance	the Band Perry	Won	

== Charts ==
=== John Hartford ===
Weekly chart performance of "Gentle on My Mind"
Chart (1967)	Peak position
US Hot Country Songs (Billboard)	60

=== Glen Campbell ===
Weekly chart performance of Glen Campbell's "Gentle on My Mind" in 1967
Chart (1967)	Peak position
Australian Kent Music Report	88
US Billboard Hot 100	62
US Hot Country Songs (Billboard)	30

Weekly chart performance of Glen Campbell's "Gentle on My Mind" in 1968
Chart (1968)	Peak position
Canada Top Singles (RPM)	60
Canada Country Singles (RPM)	20
US Hot Country Songs (Billboard)	44
US Billboard Hot 100	39
US Adult Contemporary (Billboard) then called Easy Listening	8

=== Other artists ===
Weekly chart performance of "Gentle on My Mind" for diverse artists
Year	Artist	Chart	Peak position
1968	Patti Page	US Billboard Hot 100	66
1968	Patti Page	US Adult Contemporary (Billboard) then called Easy Listening	7
1969	Aretha Franklin		
1969	Aretha Franklin	US Billboard Hot 100	76
1969	Aretha Franklin	US Hot R&B/Hip-Hop Songs (Billboard) then called Hot Rhythm & Blues Singles	50
1969	Dean Martin		
1969	Dean Martin	US Adult Contemporary (Billboard) then called Easy Listening	9
1969	Dean Martin	UK Singles (Official Charts)	2
1969	Dean Martin	IRE Top Singles	3
2014
2014	The Band Perry		
2014	The Band Perry	US Hot Country Songs (Billboard)	35
2014	The Band Perry	US Country Airplay (Billboard)	29
