= Mark Twang =

Studio album by John Hartford
- Released: June 1976
- Recorded: 1976
- Genre: Bluegrass
- Length: 34:50
- Label: Flying Fish
- Producer: Michael Melford

John Hartford chronology
Morning Bugle (1972)	Mark Twang (1976)	Nobody Knows What You Do (1977)

Mark Twang is a 1976 album by American bluegrass singer-songwriter and instrumentalist John Hartford. Much of his songs for the album were inspired by Hartford's experiences working on a riverboat, notably "The Julia Belle Swain" and "Let Him Go on Mama." The album was recorded all acoustic in the studio with Hartford by himself on all instruments and vocals. At the Grammy Awards of 1977, Mark Twang won the Grammy Award for Best Ethnic or Traditional Folk Recording.

== Background ==
During the four-year break since the end of his contract with Warner Bros. Records and the release of Morning Bugle, Hartford earned his riverboat pilot's license, played live or sat in on others' records, and signed with the independent label Flying Fish. He accompanied himself alone in the studio with either banjo, guitar and fiddle as well as a sheet of plywood for clogging.

== Reception ==
Professional ratings
Review scores
Source	Rating
Allmusic	4.5/5 stars
Christgau's Record Guide	B

Writing for Allmusic, critic Ronnie D. Lankford, Jr. wrote of the album "The songs, as usual, run from sentimental to strange, from the romantic to the weird... Mark Twang may not be the first stopping place for the new Hartford fan, but for those already familiar with his unique talent, it's a must have." Music critic Robert Christgau wrote "These days he sings mostly about the mighty Mississippi (too thick to navigate, too thin to plow) and records eccentric river music for a folk label. He's slightly the better for it, on the whole—but I wouldn't say his living sounds so secure that he should turn down a gig on the Proud Mary. A gig playing, or a gig navigating."

== Track listing ==
All tracks composed by John Hartford; except where indicated

1. "Skippin' in the Mississippi Dew" – 3:01
2. "Long Hot Summer Days" – 4:48
3. "Let Him Go On, Mama" – 3:49
4. "Don't Leave Your Records in the Sun" – 2:26
5. "Tater Tate and Allen Mundy" – 2:42
6. "The Julia Belle Swain" – 4:48
7. "Little Cabin Home on the Hill Waugh Waugh" (Bill Monroe, Lester Flatt, Hartford) – 1:13
8. "Austin Minor Sympathy" – 6:42
9. "The Lowest Pair" – 0:45
10. "Tryin' to Do Something to Get Your Attention" – 4:39

== Personnel ==
- John Hartford - banjo, guitar, fiddle, plywood, vocals

== Production ==
- Producer: Michael Melford
- Recording Engineer: Claude Hill
- Art Direction: John Hartford
- Cover Artwork: Willy Matthews
- Liner notes: John Hartford

== See also ==
- Julia Belle Swain
- Little Cabin Home on the Hill
