= Steamboat in a Cornfield =

Steamboat in a Cornfield (ISBN 0-517-56141-7) is a children's book written by musician and steamboat pilot John Hartford. It was published in 1986 by the Crown Publishing Group and it is out-of-print.

== Plot ==
Hartford tells the exciting true story of the incident in the life of an Ohio River steamboat around 1910. The boat, the Virginia, was subject to the rather fickle nature of the river at that time and ended up stuck in a cornfield. This steamboat navigated the river before locks and dams were constructed to help regulate the waterway. Hartford recounts the hard times faced by this particular steamboat company which pressured the captain to make an ill-advised venture. The book uses old photos and maps to show the steamboat and trace its route. The accomplishment of what was seemingly an impossible task to refloat the steamboat is documented. The book ends with a coda, describing the fate of the characters.

In May 1991, the Gasoline Alley comic strip featured Hartford in a storyline that paralleled that of the children's book.
