= The Love Album (John Hartford album) =

Studio album by John Hartford
- Released: 1968
- Genres: Folk, country, novelty
- Label: RCA Victor
- Producer: Felton Jarvis

John Hartford chronology
Earthwords & Music (1967)	The Love Album (1968)	Housing Project (1968)

Alternative cover
- 2002 BMG Re-issue

The Love Album is John Hartford's third LP, released in 1968. Like all of his RCA recordings, it was reissued in 2002 as part of a "twofer" CD, combined with his fourth album, Housing Project.

== Reception ==
Professional ratings
Review scores
Source	Rating
AllMusic	4/5 stars
AllMusic	3.5/5 stars

Music critic Richie Unterberger, writing for AllMusic, wrote "His droll delivery and toying with clichés makes it hard to tell whether he's the straight man or a joker, and it's that ambiguity that makes these oddball tunes so intriguing — such pleasant, straight country-pop on the one hand, but such deviously subtle irony on the other."

== Track listing ==
All tracks written by John Hartford.

1. "Why Do You Do Me Like You Do?"
2. "The 6 O'Clock Train & a Girl With Green Eyes"
3. "Springtime All Over Again"
4. "Landscape Grown Cold"
5. "This Eve of Parting"
6. "I Would Not Be Here"
7. "Natural to Be Gone"
8. "Empty Afternoon of Summer Longing"
9. "A Simple Thing as Love"
10. "Windows"
11. "Prayer"
12. "Love Is Sweeter"
