= Looks at Life =

Studio album by John Hartford
- Released: 1967
- Genre: Folk, country, novelty
- Label: RCA Victor
- Producer: Felton Jarvis

John Hartford chronology
Looks at Life (1967)	Earthwords & Music (1967)

Alternative cover

Looks at Life is singer-songwriter-multi-instrumentalist John Hartford's debut album. It set the pattern for all of his RCA albums over the next four years: a combination of dry wit and superb musicianship, delivered with a warm conversational baritone. This, along with the next five albums, were repackaged in three "twofer" CDs on BMG's Camden Deluxe label in 2002, immediately following his death.

== Reception ==
Professional ratings
Review scores
Source	Rating
AllMusic	3/5 stars
AllMusic	3/5 stars

Music critic Richie Unterberger, of AllMusic, wrote, "Though occasional songs skirted commercial country-pop ('Like Unto a Mockingbird', 'Minus the Woman') and novelty tunes ('I Shoulda Wore My Birthday Suit' and the kazoo-laden 'Jack's in the Sack'), usually they fell somewhere between the normal and the silly. It wasn't quite as good as the best of his subsequent RCA albums of the late '60s and early '70s, though, as the melodies weren't quite as strong and the production not as elaborate. 'The Tall Tall Grass' does give a hint of what was to come..."

== Track listing ==
All songs written by John Hartford.

1. "I Reckon" – 1:21
2. "Today" – 3:16
3. "A Man Smoking a Cigar" – 2:04
4. "Untangle Your Mind" – 2:03
5. "Like Unto a Mockingbird" – 2:53
6. "I Shoulda Wore My Birthday Suit" – 1:51
7. "The Tall Tall Grass" – 2:26
8. "Front Porch" – 2:00
9. "Eve of My Multiplication" – 1:49
10. "When the Sky Began to Fall" – 3:51
11. "Corn Cob Blues" – 2:36
12. "Minus the Woman" – 2:57
13. "Jack's in the Sack" – 2:09
