= Robert Amft =

American artist

Robert Amft (December 7, 1916 – October 28, 2012) was a painter, sculptor, photographer, designer born in Chicago.

== Biography ==
Amft grew up during the Great Depression. After graduating from high school, he worked for a year for the New Deal's Civilian Conservation Corps in the Sawtooth Mountains of Idaho before enrolling in the School of the Art Institute of Chicago, studying at the Saugatuck Summer School of Painting. He graduated from the School of the Chicago Art Institute, 1939.

He entered advertising and publishing design upon graduation and taught at the Ray School in Chicago and the New Orleans Academy of Fine Arts. He was a senior book designer for the Language Arts Department at Scott Foresman & Co. His painting Sunday Afternoon in Lincoln Park won First Prize at the New Horizons Annual Exhibition in 1975, and his painting Head won the Renaissance Prize at the Artists of Chicago and Vicinity Show.

In 1985, he won a Painting Award from the Beverly Art Center, and in 1986, he was Curator's Choice at the Art Sales and Rental Gallery of the Art Institute of Chicago. He has also exhibited his watercolors at the International Watercolor Show. In 2005, the Chicago Public Radio program Hello Beautiful! featured Amft in an extended audio visit to his home studio.

For more than 70 years, Amft worked in a variety of media—oils, watercolors, collages, sculptures, photographs. His photography and design have won over fifty awards and have been reproduced in Graphics Annual, N.Y. Art Director Annual, Life, and Photo Graphics. His sculpture, Dog, won an award in the 1994 Beverly Art Center Annual Exhibition and his Whistler's Mother sculpture won the Best of Show Award at the 1997 Later Impressions' Exhibit held at the James R. Thompson Center in Chicago.

Amft died in Myrtle Beach, South Carolina, on October 28, 2012, at the age of 95.

== Solo exhibitions ==
- 2014 Richardson Gallery "Robert Amft: Painter, Sculptor, Photographer, Designer" Conway, SC
- 2012 Galleries Anaerobic Studios "Robert Amft: The Work" Myrtle Beach, SC
- 2010 Maurice Sternberg Galleries: "Robert Amft: Still Out of His Mind" – Robert Amft: New Paintings, 1970-2010 (Chicago)
- 2008 Maurice Sternberg Galleries: "Robert Amft: Out of His Mind" – Personal Paintings: 1938 – 1960 (Chicago)
- 2006 Corbett vs Dempsey Gallery: "Paintings for Particular People — A Survey, 1935-2005" – Major Works (Chicago)
- 2003 Woodland Pattern Book Center
- 2003 "Robert Amft's Beastiary" (Milwaukee)
- 1996 Intuit Gallery: Illinois — Photos 1996 (Chicago)
- 1994 Rotunda Gallery: Illinois — Photos (Highland Park)
- 1994 Caputo Gallery (Madison, Wisconsin)
- 1989 Illinois Printers (Springfield, Illinois)
- 1985 One Illinois Center: "Recent Painting" (Chicago)
- 1984 Kansas State University: "Watercolors"
- 1982 Countryside Art Center (Arlington Heights)
- 1981 Hammer & Hammer Gallery (Chicago)
- 1981 Joy Horwich Gallery (Chicago)
- 1979 Western Illinois University
- 1970 Welna Gallery (Chicago)
- 1970 Junior Museum (Art Institute, Chicago)
- 1968 Medical Center (University of Illinois)
- 1967, 1968 St. Xavier's College
- 1964 Cliff Dwellers Club
- 1963 Panoras Gallery (New York)
- 1961, 1962, 1964 Old Town Art Center
- 1957, 1959 Morris Gallery (New York)

== Group exhibitions and awards ==
- 2008 "Chicago Art" Artropolis (Chicago)
- 2005 "Six Rings" Corbett vs Dempsey Gallery
- 2005 "Chicago at Mid Century" De Paul Art Museum (Chicago)
- 2005 "Art in Chicago" Pennsylvania Academy of Fine Art
- 2003 "Animal Images Show": First Prize — Sculpture "Coyote" Anti-Cruelty Society
- 2000 Triennial International Print (Krakow, Poland)
- 1997 Print & Drawing Annual 21st Harper College/Western Illinois University
- 1997 Bi-State Exhibition Museum of Art
- 1997 8th International Print Competition (Osaka, Japan)
- 1997 "Roadside Attractions" Museum of Art Lafayette
- 1997 "Later Impressions": Best of Show (Chicago)
- 1996 Midwestern Sculpture South Bend Regional Art Center (South Bend, Indiana)
- 1996 Annual Best of Photography Photographer's Forum
- 1995 Artforms Museum of Art Lafayette
- 1993 Genesis — Paintings R.H. Love Gallery (Chicago)
- 1993 Beverly Art Center: Sculpture Award
- 1993 "A Place in the World" – Photos, Alverno College (Milwaukee, Wisconsin)
- 1990 Midwestern Sculptures South Bend Art Center (South Bend, Indiana)
- 1990 "Illinois Painters" Springfield Art Association
- 1986 Curators Choice Art Rental Gallery Art Institute Chicago
- 1985 Painting Award Beverly Art Center
- 1984 "Mainstreams '74" Marietta College (Marietta, Ohio)
- 1978 Painting and Sculpture Today (Indianapolis, Indiana)
- 1975 New Horizons — Painting Award Annual
- 1975 Chicago Vicinity Show: Renaissance Prize (Chicago)
- 1965 Washington Museum (Tacoma)
- 1958 Pennsylvania Academy Annual (Youngstown, Ohio) Purchase Prize Butler Institute of Art (New York)
- 1952 Hallmark Show: Hallmark Award
- 1947 Pepsi Cola Annual
- 1940, 1956, 1963, 1974, 1975 Chicago and Vicinity Show
- 1938, 1939, 1941 International Watercolor Show

== Reviews ==
- Bonesteel, Michael. Review of photography at Rotunda Gallery, Highland Park, Illinois. "Living in Their Own World", Evanston Review (February 18, 1993)
- Two-man show at Art Rental Gallery. Bulletin of the Art Institute of Chicago (November–December 1978, vol. 72, no. 6)
- "Great Treasures from the Art Institute of Chicago", Reproductions of 7 of Amft's "Modified Masters", Chicago Magazine (April 1977)
- Kultermann, Udo. "Van Gogh in Contemporary Art", Art Voices South (January 1976)
- "Les Americans a Paris". Reproduction of "Pink Sunglasses" (Mona Lisa), Le Dessin (January 1976)
- Who's Who in American Art (1976)
- Kind, Joshua. Article on Chicago Vicinity Show, New Art Examiner (February 1975)
- Reproduction of "Head". Sun Times (December 15, 1974)
- Article related to Amft's winning First Prize in "New Horizons", 1972, Evanston Review (June 29, 1972)
- Arts Club Members Show. Chicago Sun Times (April 22, 1973)
- Schultze, Franze. Review of exhibition at Welna Gallery, Chicago Daily News (March 18, 1972)
- Anderson. Don. Review of Welna Exhibition, Chicago Sun Times (January 11, 1970)
- Wagner, Robert. Review of exhibition at Welna Gallery, Chicago Trlbune (January 3, 1970)
- Haydon, Harold. Review. "What does this talent outpour mean?" Review of 75th Artists of Chicago & Vicinity Show.
- Burckhardt, Edith. Review of one-man show at Morris Gallery, New York: A-"Grandpa Moses of Concrete"
- Article showing Amft's photographs of the sculpture of self-taught artist, Fred Smith. LIFE (November 1969)
- Sawin, Martica. Review of one-man show at Morris Gallery, New York, Arts Magazine (January 1958)

== Sources ==
- Illinois, Cook County Birth Certificates, 1878-1922
- Official Robert Amft website
- Robert Amft biography
- Galleries of Robert Amft's artwork on Flickr
