= List of songs recorded by Frank Sinatra =

The following is a sortable table of songs recorded by Frank Sinatra:

- The column Song lists the song title.
- The column Year lists the year in which the song was recorded.
- 1,134 songs are listed in the table. This may not include every song for which a recording by Sinatra exists.
  - (Note: Such words as a, an, and the are not recognized as first words of titles):

Song title	Year(s) recorded	Songwriters
Ac-cent-tchu-ate the Positive	1950 (television)	Harold Arlen, Johnny Mercer
Accidents Will Happen	1950	Johnny Burke, Jimmy Van Heusen
Adeste Fideles	1946, 1957	John Francis Wade
Ad-Lib Blues	1954 (film)	Yip Harburg, Burton Lane
An Affair to Remember (Our Love Affair)	1962	Harold Adamson, Leo McCarey, Harry Warren
After You've Gone	1984	Henry Creamer, Turner Layton
Ain't She Sweet	1962	Milton Ager, Jack Yellen
Ain't Cha Ever Comin' Back?	1947	Axel Stordahl, Irving Taylor, Paul Weston
Air For English Horn	1945	Alec Wilder
Alice Blue Gown	1940 (radio)	Joseph McCarthy, Harry Tierney
All Alone	1962	Irving Berlin
All By Myself	1976	Eric Carmen
All I Do Is Dream of You	1958	Nacio Herb Brown, Arthur Freed
All I Need is the Girl	1967	Stephen Sondheim, Jule Styne
All My Tomorrows	1958, 1969	Sammy Cahn, Jimmy Van Heusen
All of Me	1946, 1947, 1954	Gerald Marks, Seymour Simons
All of You	1979	Cole Porter
All or Nothing at All	1939, 1961, 1966, 1977	Arthur Altman, Jack Lawrence
All the Things You Are	1945	Oscar Hammerstein II, Jerome Kern
All the Way	1957, 1963	Sammy Cahn, Jimmy Van Heusen
All the Way Home	1983	Teddy Randazzo
All This and Heaven Too	1940	Eddie DeLange, Jimmy Van Heusen
All Through the Day	1946	Oscar Hammerstein II, Jerome Kern
Almost Like Being in Love	1947, 1961	Alan Jay Lerner, Frederick Loewe
Always	1946, 1947, 1960	Irving Berlin
America the Beautiful	1945, 1963	Samuel A. Ward
American Beauty Rose	1950, 1961	Arthur Altman, Mack David, Redd Evans
Among My Souvenirs	1946, 1954	Edgar Leslie, Lawrence Wright
And Then You Kissed Me	1944 (radio)	Sammy Cahn, Jimmy Van Heusen
Angel Eyes	1958, 1971, 1978	Earl Brent, Matt Dennis
Anything	1940	Eddie DeLange, P. Napoleon, Frank Signorelli
Anything Goes	1956	Cole Porter
Anytime (I'll Be There)	1975	Paul Anka
Anytime, Anywhere	1953	Imogen Carpenter, Lenny Adelson
Any Time at All	1964	Baker Knight
April in Paris	1950, 1957, 1961	Vernon Duke, Yip Harburg
April Played the Fiddle	1940	Johnny Burke, James Monaco
Are You Lonesome Tonight?	1962	Lou Handman, Roy Turk
Aren't You Glad You're You?	1945	Johnny Burke, Jimmy Van Heusen
Around the World	1957	Harold Adamson, Victor Young
As Long as I Live	1960 (television)	Harold Adamson, Ted Koehler
As Time Goes By	1961	Herman Hupfeld
As You Desire Me	1961	Allie Wrubel
At Least a Little in Love	1940	unknown
At Long Last Love	1956, 1962	Cole Porter
Autumn in New York	1947, 1957	Vernon Duke
Autumn Leaves	1957	Joseph Kosma, Johnny Mercer, Jacques Prévert
Available	1964	Sammy Cahn, Ned Wynn, L. B. Marks
Ave Maria	1945	Franz Schubert
Azure-Te (Paris Blues)	1952	William Davis, Donald Wolf
A Baby Just Like You	1975	John Denver, Joe Henry
Baby, Won't You Please Come Home?	1957	Charles Warfield, Clarence Williams
Bad, Bad Leroy Brown	1973, 1974 (live)	Jim Croce
Bali Ha'i	1949	Oscar Hammerstein II, Richard Rodgers
Bang Bang (My Baby Shot Me Down)	1973, 1981	Sonny Bono
Barbara	1977	Mack David, Jimmy Van Heusen
Baubles, Bangles and Beads	1958, 1967	George Forrest, Robert Wright
The Beautiful Strangers	1969	Rod McKuen
Be Careful, It's My Heart	1942, 1960	Irving Berlin
Before the Music Ends	1979	Gordon Jenkins
Begin the Beguine	1946	Cole Porter
Bein' Green	1970	Joe Raposo
The Bells of Christmas	1968	Traditional
The Best I Ever Had	1976	Danny Hice, Ruby Hice
The Best is Yet to Come	1964, 1994	Cy Coleman, Carolyn Leigh
The Best of Everything	1984	Fred Ebb, John Kander
Between the Devil and the Deep Blue Sea	1959	Harold Arlen, Ted Koehler
Bewitched, Bothered and Bewildered	1957, 1963, 1994	Lorenz Hart, Richard Rodgers
Bim Bam Baby	1952	Sammy Mysels
The Birth of the Blues	1952, 1957	Buddy G. DeSylva, Lew Brown, Ray Henderson
Black	1956	Victor Young
Blame It on My Youth	1956	Edward Heyman, Oscar Levant
Blue	1956	Alec Wilder
Blue Hawaii	1957	Ralph Rainger, Leo Robin
Blue Lace	1968	Bill Jacob, Patty Jacob, Riz Ortolani
Blue Moon	1960	Lorenz Hart, Richard Rodgers
Blue Skies	1941, 1946	Irving Berlin
Blues in the Night	1958	Harold Arlen, Johnny Mercer
Body and Soul	1947, 1984	Edward Heyman, Robert Sour, Frank Eyton, Johnny Green
Bonita	1969	Antonio Carlos Jobim, Ray Gilbert, Gene Lees
Bop Goes My Heart	1948	Walter Bishop Sr., Jule Styne
Born Free	1967	John Barry, Don Black
Both Sides Now	1968	Joni Mitchell
The Boys Night Out	1962	Sammy Cahn, Jule Styne
Brazil	1957	Ary Barroso, Bob Russell
The Brooklyn Bridge	1946	Sammy Cahn, Jule Styne
Brown	1956	Jeff Alexander
Buds Won't Bud	1940 (radio)	Harold Arlen, Yip Harburg
But Beautiful	1947	Johnny Burke, Jimmy Van Heusen
But None Like You	1947	Ray Noble
But Not for Me	1979	George Gershwin, Ira Gershwin.
By the Time I Get to Phoenix	1968	Jimmy Webb
Bye Bye Baby	1948	Leo Robin, Jule Styne
Bye Bye Blackbird	1988 (live recording)	Mort Dixon, Ray Henderson
California	1963	Jimmy Van Heusen, Sammy Cahn
Call Me	1966	Tony Hatch
Call Me Irresponsible	1963	Jimmy Van Heusen, Sammy Cahn
The Call of the Canyon	1940	Billy Hill
Collegiate	1957 (television)	Nat Bonx, Moe Jaffe
Can I Steal a Little Love?	1956	Phil Tuminello
Can't We Be Friends	1955	Paul James, Kay Swift
Can't You Just See Yourself?	1947	Sammy Cahn, Jule Styne
Carolina in the Morning	1963 (live recording)	Walter Donaldson, Gus Kahn
Castle Rock	1951	Ervin Drake, Al Sears, Jimmy Shirl
Catana	1947	Eddie DeLange, Alfred Newman
C'est Magnifique	1959	Cole Porter
Change Partners	1967	Irving Berlin
The Charm of You	1944	Sammy Cahn, Jule Styne
Charmaine	1962	Lew Pollack, Erno Rapee
Chattanoogie Shoe Shine Boy	1950	Harry Stone, Jack Stapp
Cheek to Cheek	1958	Irving Berlin
Cherry Pies Ought to Be You	1950	Cole Porter
Chicago (That Toddlin' Town)	1957	Fred Fisher
Christmas Dreaming	1947	Irving Gordon, Lester Lee
Christmas Memories	1975	Alan Bergman, Marilyn Bergman, Don Costa
The Christmas Song	1957	Mel Tormé, Bob Wells
The Christmas Waltz	1954, 1957, 1968	Sammy Cahn, Jule Styne
Ciribiribin	1939	Alberto Pestalozza, Carlo Tiochet
Close Enough for Love	1982	Johnny Mandel, Paul Williams
Close to You	1943, 1956	Jerry Livingston, Carl Lampl, Al Hoffman.
(They Long to Be) Close to You	1970	Burt Bacharach, Hal David
The Coffee Song	1946, 1960	Bob Hilliard, Dick Miles
Come Back to Me	1967	Burton Lane, Alan Jay Lerner
Come Back to Sorrento	1950	Claude Aveling, Ernesto De Curtis, Giambattista De Curtis
Come Blow Your Horn	1963	Sammy Cahn, Jimmy Van Heusen
Come Dance with Me	1958	Sammy Cahn, Jimmy Van Heusen
Come Fly with Me	1957, 1965, 1994	Sammy Cahn, Jimmy Van Heusen
Come Out, Come Out, Wherever You Are	1944	Sammy Cahn, Jule Styne
Come Rain or Come Shine	1961, 1993	Harold Arlen, Johnny Mercer
Come Waltz with Me	1962	Sammy Cahn, Jule Styne
Comme Ci Comme Ca	1948	Bruno Coquatrix, Pierre Dudan, Alex Kramer, Joan Whitney Kramer
The Continental	1950, 1964	Con Conrad, Herb Magidson
A Cottage for Sale	1959	Larry Conley, Willard Robison
Could 'Ja?	1946	Bill Carey, Carl T. Fischer
Crazy Love	1957	Sammy Cahn, Phil Tuminello
The Cradle Song	1944	Johannes Brahms
Cuddle up a Little Closer, Lovey Mine	1958	Otto Harbach, Karl Hoschna
The Curse of an Aching Heart	1961	Henry Fink, Al Piantadosi
Cycles	1968	Gayle Caldwell
Dancing in the Dark	1958	Arthur Schwartz, Howard Dietz
Dancing on the Ceiling	1955	Lorenz Hart, Richard Rodgers
The Day After Forever	1946	Johnny Burke, Jimmy Van Heusen
Day by Day	1945, 1961	Axel Stordahl, Sammy Cahn, Paul Weston
Day In, Day Out	1953, 1954, 1958	Rube Bloom, Johnny Mercer
Manhã De Carnaval (A Day in the Life of a Fool)	1969	Luiz Bonfá, Antônio Maria.
The Days of Wine and Roses	1964	Henry Mancini, Johnny Mercer
Daybreak	1942, 1961	Harold Adamson, Ferde Grofe
Dear Heart	1964	Ray Evans, Jay Livingston, Henry Mancini
Dear Little Boy of Mine	1950	Ernest Ball, J. Keirn Brennan
Deep in a Dream	1955	Eddie DeLange, Jimmy Van Heusen
Deep Night	1951	Rudy Vallee, Charlie Henderson
Desafinado	1969	Antonio Carlos Jobim, Newton Mendonça, Jon Hendricks, Gene Lees
Devil May Care	1940	Johnny Burke, Harry Warren
Dick Haymes, Dick Todd and Como	1944	Johnny Burke, Sammy Cahn, Jimmy Van Heusen
Didn't We	1969	Jimmy Webb
Dig Down Deep	1942	Walter Hirsch, S. Marco, Gerald Marks
Dindi	1967	Antonio Carlos Jobim, Ray Gilbert, Aloysio de Oliveira
Do I Worry?	1941	Bobby Worth, Stanley Cowan
Do You Know Why?	1940	Johnny Burke, Jimmy Van Heusen
Dolores	1941	Frank Loesser, Louis Alter
Don'cha Go 'Way Mad	1962	Illinois Jacquet, Jimmy Mundy, Al Stillman.
Don't Be a Do-Badder	1964	Sammy Cahn, Jimmy Van Heusen
Don't Be that Way	1961	Benny Goodman, Mitchell Parish, Edgar Sampson
Don't Blame Me	1953	Dorothy Fields, Jimmy McHugh
Don't Change Your Mind About Me	1954	Lenny Adelson, Imogen Carpenter
Don't Cry, Joe	1949, 1961	Joe Marsala
Don't Ever Be Afraid to Go Home	1952	Bob Hilliard, Carl Sigman
Don't Ever Go Away (Por Causa de Você)	1969	Ray Gilbert, Delores Duran, Antonio Carlos Jobim
Don't Forget Tonight, Tomorrow	1945	Jay Milton, Ukie Sherin
Don't Get Around Much Anymore	1965 (television)	Duke Ellington, Bob Russell
Don't Like Goodbyes	1956	Harold Arlen, Truman Capote
Don't Make a Beggar of Me	1953	Al Sherman
Don't Sleep in the Subway	1967	Tony Hatch, Jackie Trent
Don't Take Your Love From Me	1961	Henry Nemo
Don't Wait Too Long	1965	Sunny Skylar
Don't Worry 'Bout Me	1953	Rube Bloom, Ted Koehler.
Down Where the Trade Winds Play	1942 (radio)	unknown
Downtown	1966	Tony Hatch
Dream	1945, 1960	Johnny Mercer
Dream a Little Dream of Me	1958	Fabian Andre, Gus Kahn, Wilbur Schwandt
Dream Away	1973	Paul Williams, John Williams
Drinking Again	1967	Johnny Mercer, Doris Tauber.
Dry Your Eyes	1976	Neil Diamond, Robbie Robertson
The Dum Dot Song (I Put a Penny in the Gum Slot)	1946	Julian Kay
Early American	1964	Johnny Burke, Jimmy Van Heusen
East of the Sun (and West of the Moon)	1940, 1961	Brooks Bowman
Ebb Tide	1958	Robert Maxwell, Carl Sigman
Elizabeth	1969	Bob Gaudio, Jake Holmes
Embraceable You	1944, 1960, 1994	George Gershwin, Ira Gershwin
Emily (Theme from The Americanization of Emily)	1964, 1977	John Mandel, Johnny Mercer
Empty Is (spoken)	1969	Rod McKuen
Empty Tables	1973, 1974, 1976	Johnny Mercer, Jimmy Van Heusen
The End of a Love Affair	1956	Edward C. Redding
Evergreen (Love Theme from A Star Is Born)	1976	Barbra Streisand, Paul Williams
Ever Homeward	1947	Sammy Cahn, Jule Styne
Every Day of My Life	1939	M. Beck, B. Hays, Harry James
Every Man Should Marry	1949	Benny Davis, Abner Silver
Everybody Has the Right to Be Wrong (At Least Once)	1965	Sammy Cahn, Jimmy Van Heusen
Everybody Loves Somebody	1947, 1957	Sam Coslow, Irving Taylor, Ken Lane
Everybody Ought to Be in Love	1977	Paul Anka
Everybody's Twistin'	1962	Rube Bloom, Ted Koehler
Everything Happens to Me	1941, 1956, 1974, 1981	Tom Adair, Matt Dennis
Exactly Like You	1946, 1949	Dorothy Fields, Jimmy McHugh
Exodus	1962	Ernest Gold
The Fable of the Rose	1940	Josef Myrow, Bickley Reichner
Fairy Tale	1955	Jerry Livingston, Dok Stanford
Faithful	1951	Mary Ann Kennedy, Candy Parton, Pam Rose
Falling In Love with Love	1945, 1961	Lorenz Hart, Richard Rodgers
Farewell, Farewell to Love	1951	George Siravo, Jack Wolf
Feelin' Kinda Sunday	1970	Nino Tempo, Annette Tucker, Kathleen Wakefield
Feet of Clay	1952	Alex Kramer, Joan Whitney Kramer, Hy Zaret
A Fella With An Umbrella	1948	Irving Berlin
A Fellow Needs a Girl	1947	Oscar Hammerstein II, Richard Rodgers
A Fine Romance	1960	Dorothy Fields, Jerome Kern
The First Noël	1957	Traditional
Five Hundred Guys	1956	David Cantor, Irving Kosloff
Five Minutes More	1946, 1961	Sammy Cahn, Jule Styne
Flowers Mean Forgiveness	1956	Al Frisch, Edward R. White, Mack Wolfson
Fly Me to the Moon	1964	Bart Howard
A Foggy Day	1953, 1960, 1994	George Gershwin, Ira Gershwin
Follow Me	1967	Alan Jay Lerner, Frederick Loewe
Fools Rush In (Where Angels Fear to Tread)	1940, 1947, 1960	Rube Bloom, Johnny Mercer
For a While	1969	Bob Gaudio, Jake Holmes
For Every Man There's a Woman	1947	Harold Arlen, Leo Robin
For Once in My Life	1969, 1994	Ron Miller, Orlando Murden
For the Good Times	1979	Kris Kristofferson
Forget Domani	1965	Norman Newell, Riz Ortolani
Forget to Remember	1969	Victoria Pike, Teddy Randazzo
A Friend of Yours	1945	Johnny Burke, Jimmy Van Heusen
Free for All	1941	Tom Adair, Matt Dennis
French Foreign Legion	1958	Aaron Schroeder, Guy Wood
Frenesi	1941 (radio)	Ray Charles, Alberto Domínguez, Bob Russell
From Here to Eternity	1953	Fred Karger, Robert Wells
From Promise to Promise	1969	Rod McKuen
From the Bottom of My Heart	1939	Roy Ingraham, Jack Murray
From the Bottom to the Top	1955	Gee Wilson
From This Day Forward	1946	Robert Bernard, Mort Greene, Leigh Harline, Jan Wiley
From This Moment On	1956	Cole Porter
Fugue for Tinhorns	1963	Frank Loesser
Full Moon and Empty Arms	1945	Buddy Kaye, Ted Mossman
The Future	1979	Gordon Jenkins
The Gal that Got Away	1954, 1981	Harold Arlen, Ira Gershwin
The Game is Over	1970	John Denver
A Garden in the Rain	1962	Carroll Gibbons, James Dyrenforth
Gentle on My Mind	1968	John Hartford
Get Happy	1954	Harold Arlen, Ted Koehler
Get Me to the Church on Time	1966	Alan Jay Lerner, Frederick Loewe
The Girl from Ipanema	1967	Vinícius de Moraes, Norman Gimbel, Antônio Carlos Jobim
The Girl Next Door	1953, 1962	Hugh Martin, Ralph Blane
The Girl That I Marry	1946	Irving Berlin
The Girls I Never Kissed	1986, 1988	Jerry Leiber, Mike Stoller
Give Her Love	1966	Jim Harbert
Glad to Be Unhappy	1955	Lorenz Hart, Richard Rodgers
Go Tell it on the Mountain	1964	Traditional
God's Country	1950	Haven Gillespie, Beasley Smith
Goin' Out of My Head	1969	Teddy Randazzo, Bobby Weinstein
Gold	1956	Nelson Riddle
Golden Moment	1965	Kenny Jacobson, Rhoda Roberts
The Good Life	1964	Sacha Distel, Jack Reardon
A Good Man is Hard to Find	1951	Eddie Green
Gone with the Wind	1958	Allie Wrubel, Herb Magidson
Good Thing Going	1981	Stephen Sondheim
Goodbye	1958	Gordon Jenkins
Goodbye Lover, Goodbye	1969	unknown
Goodbye (She Quietly Says)	1969	Bob Gaudio, Jake Holmes
Goodnight Irene	1950	Traditional
Goodnight My Love	1958	Mack Gordon, Harry Revel
Goodnight Sweetheart	1958	Ray Noble, Jimmy Campbell and Reg Connelly, Rudy Vallee
Goody Goody	1962	Matty Malneck, Johnny Mercer.
Gotta Be This or That	1945 (radio)	Sunny Skylar
Granada	1961	Agustín Lara
Gray	1956	Alec Wilder
Green	1956	Gordon Jenkins
Guess I'll Hang My Tears Out to Dry	1946, 1958, 1993	Sammy Cahn, Jule Styne
Gunga Din	1966	Jim Croce, Rudyard Kipling
Guys and Dolls	1963	Frank Loesser
The Gypsy	1962	Billy Reid
Half as Lovely (Twice as True)	1954	Sammy Gallop, Lew Spence
Half Way Down the Street	1940 (radio)	unknown
Hallelujah, I Love Her So	1969	Ray Charles
Happy Birthday to You	1994 (live performance)	Patty Hill, Mildred J. Hill
Hark the Herald Angels Sing	1957	Traditional
Have You Met Miss Jones?	1960, 1961	Lorenz Hart, Richard Rodgers
Have Yourself a Merry Little Christmas	1947, 1957, 1963	Ralph Blane, Hugh Martin
He's My Guy	1957	Gene DePaul, Don Raye
Head on My Pillow	1940	Pierre Connor, Bissel Palmer
Hear My Song Violetta	1940	Buddy Bernier, Robert Emmerich, Othmar Klase, Rudolph Inkesch
Hello, Dolly!	1964	Jerry Herman
Hello, Young Lovers	1951, 1954, 1965	Oscar Hammerstein II, Richard Rodgers
Help Yourself to My Heart	1947	Buddy Kaye, Sammy Timberg
Here Comes the Night	1939	H. Edelstein, C. Hohengarten, Frank Loesser
Here Goes	1958	Sammy Cahn
Here's That Rainy Day	1959	Johnny Burke, Jimmy Van Heusen
Here's to Love	1941 (radio)	Mina Anna Arenson
Here's to the Band	1983	Sharman Howe, Alfred Nittoli, Artie Schroeck
Here's to the Losers	1963	Robert Wells, Jack Segal
Hey! Jealous Lover	1956	Sammy Cahn, Kay Twomey, Bee Walker
Hey Look, No Crying	1981	Susan Birkenhead, Jule Styne
Hidden Persuasion	1960	Wainwright Churchill III
High Hopes	1959	Sammy Cahn, Jimmy Van Heusen
Hit the Road to Dreamland	1958	Harold Arlen, Johnny Mercer
Home on the Range	1946	Brewster M. Higley, Daniel E. Kelley
Homesick That's All	1945	Gordon Jenkins
Hooray for Love	1982	Harold Arlen, Leo Robin
The House I Live In	1945, 1964, 1994	Lewis Allan, Earl Robinson
How About You?	1941, 1956	Burton Lane, Ralph Freed
How Am I to Know	1940 (radio)	Jack King, Dorothy Parker
How Are You Fixed for Love?	1958	Sammy Cahn, Jimmy Van Heusen
How Could You Do a Thing Like That to Me?	1955	Tyree Glenn, Allan Roberts
How Cute Can You Be?	1946	Bill Carey, Carl T. Fischer
How Deep is the Ocean?	1946, 1960	Irving Berlin
How Do You Do Without Me?	1941	Joe Bushkin, John DeVries
How Do You Keep the Music Playing?	1983, 1984, 1994	Alan Bergman, Marilyn Bergman, Michel Legrand
How High the Moon	1967 (television)	Nancy Hamilton, Morgan Lewis
How Insensitive	1967	Antônio Carlos Jobim, Norman Gimbel, Vinícius de Moraes
(How Little It Matters) How Little We Know	1956, 1963	Carolyn Leigh, Phil Springers
How Old am I?	1965	Gordon Jenkins
A Hundred Years from Today	1984	Victor Young, Ned Washington, Joe Young
The Hucklebuck	1949	Roy Alfred, A. Gibson
The Hurt Doesn't Go Away	1973	Joe Raposo
Hush-A-Bye-Island	1946	Harold Adamson, Jimmy McHugh
I Am Loved	1950	Cole Porter
I Begged Her	1944	Sammy Cahn, Jule Styne
I Believe	1946, 1957	Sammy Cahn, Jule Styne
I Believe I'm Gonna Love You	1975	Harry Lloyd, Gloria Skleroy
I Believe In You	1964	Frank Loesser
I Can Read Between the Lines	1953	Sid Frank, Ramon M Getzov
I Can't Believe I'm Losing You	1964	Don Costa, Phil Zeller
I Can't Believe That You're In Love With Me	1960	Clarence Gaskill, Jimmy McHugh
I Can't Get Started	1959	Vernon Duke Ira Gershwin
I Can't Give You Anything But Love	1959 (live recording), 1959 (television)	Dorothy Fields, Jimmy McHugh
I Can't Stop Loving You	1964	Don Gibson
I Concentrate on You	1947, 1960, 1967	Cole Porter
I Could Have Danced All Night	1958	Alan Jay Lerner, Frederick Loewe
I Could Have Told You	1953	Carl Sigman, Jimmy Van Heusen
I Could Make You Care	1940	Sammy Cahn, Saul Chaplin
I Could Write a Book	1952, 1957	Lorenz Hart, Richard Rodgers
I Couldn't Care Less	1958	Sammy Cahn, Jimmy Van Heusen
I Couldn't Sleep a Wink Last Night	1943, 1956	Harold Adamson, Jimmy McHugh
I Cover the Waterfront	1957	Johnny Green, Edward Heyman
I Didn't Know What Time It Was	1957	Lorenz Hart, Richard Rodgers
I Don't Know Why (I Just Do)	1945	Fred E. Ahlert, Roy Turk
I Don't Stand a Ghost of a Chance with You	1945, 1959	Victor Young, Ned Washington, Bing Crosby
I Dream of You	1944	Marjorie Goetschius, Edna Osser
I Fall in Love Too Easily	1944	Sammy Cahn, Jule Styne
I Fall in Love With You Ev’ryday	1946	Sam H. Stept
I Get a Kick Out of You	1953, 1962	Cole Porter
I Get Along Without You Very Well (Except Sometimes)	1955	Hoagy Carmichael
I Give You My Word	1941 (radio)	Al Kavelin, Lyn
I Got a Gal I Love (In North And South Dakota)	1946	Sammy Cahn, Jimmy Van Heusen
(I Got A Woman Crazy For Me) She's Funny That Way	1943-8	Neil Moret, Richard A. Whiting
I Got It Bad (And That Ain't Good)	1956	Duke Ellington, Paul Francis Webster
I Got Plenty o' Nuttin'	1956	George Gershwin, Ira Gershwin, DuBose Heyward
I Gotta Right to Sing the Blues	1962	Harold Arlen, Ted Koehler
I Guess I'll Have to Change My Plan	1956	Howard Dietz, Arthur Schwartz
I Guess I'll Have to Dream the Rest	1941, 1950	Martin Block, Bud Green, Mickey Stoner
I Had the Craziest Dream	1979	Mack Gordon, Harry Warren
I Hadn't Anyone Till You	1961	Ray Noble
I Have But One Heart	1945	Johnny Farrow, Marty Symes
I Have Dreamed	1963	Oscar Hammerstein II, Richard Rodgers,
I Haven't Time to Be a Millionaire	1940	Johnny Burke, James Monaco
I Hear a Rhapsody	1952	George Fragos, Jack Baker, Dick Gasparre, Richard Bard
I Heard the Bells on Christmas Day	1964	John D Marks
I Left My Heart in San Francisco	1962	George Cory, Douglass Cross
I Like the Sunrise	1967	Duke Ellington
I Like to Lead When I Dance	1964	Sammy Cahn, Jimmy Van Heusen
I Love My Wife	1976	Cy Coleman, Michael Stewart
I Love Paris	1959, 1960	Cole Porter
I Love You	1946, 1953, 1962	Cole Porter
I Love You	1953	Harry Archer, Harlan Thompson
I Love You	1946	George Forest, Robert Wright
I Loved Her	1981	Gordon Jenkins
I May Be Wrong (But I Think You're Wonderful)	1958 (television)	Harry Ruskin, Henry Sullivan
I Never Knew	1961	Ted Fio Rito, Gus Kahn
I Only Have Eyes for You	1945, 1962	Al Dubin, Harry Warren
I Saw Your Face in a Cloud	1940 (radio)	Robert Fetters
I See It Now	1965	William Engvick, Alec Wilder
I See Your Face Before Me	1955	Howard Dietz, Arthur Schwartz
I Should Care	1945	Sammy Cahn, Axel Stordahl, Paul Weston
I Sing the Songs	1976	Bruce Johnston
I Think of You	1941, 1957	Jack Elliott, Don Marcotte
I Thought About You	1955, 1956	Johnny Mercer, Jimmy Van Heusen
I Tried	1941	Clark Dennis, Paul Hand, Carl Nutter
I Wanna Be Around	1964	Johnny Mercer, Sadie Vimmerstedt
I Want to Thank Your Folks	1946	Bennie Benjamin, George David Weiss
I Went Down to Virginia	1947	David Mann, Redd Evans
I Whistle a Happy Tune	1951	Oscar Hammerstein II, Richard Rodgers
I Will Drink the Wine	1970	Paul Ryan
I Will Wait for You	1966	Marc Demy, Norman Gimbel, Michel Legrand
I Wish I Were in Love Again	1956	Lorenz Hart, Richard Rodgers
I Wish You Love	1964	Léo Chauliac, Charles Trenet, Albert A. Beach
I Wished on the Moon	1965	Dorothy Parker, Ralph Rainger
I Won't Dance	1956, 1962	Oscar Hammerstein II, Otto Harbach, Jerome Kern
I Wonder Who's Kissing Her Now		Joseph E. Howard
I Would Be In Love (Anyway)	1969	Bob Gaudio, Jake Holmes
I Wouldn't Trade Christmas	1968	Sammy Cahn, Jimmy Van Heusen
I'd Know You Anywhere	1940	Johnny Mercer, Jimmy McHugh
Ida, Sweet As Apple Cider	1941 (radio)	Eddie Leonard, Eddie Munson
If	1974	David Gates
If Ever I Would Leave You	1962	Alan Jay Lerner, Frederick Loewe
If I Ever Love Again	1949	Russ Carlyle, Dick Reynolds
If I Forget You	1947	Irving Caesar
If I Had Three Wishes	1955	Claude Baum, Lew Spence
If I Had You	1947, 1956, 1962	Jimmy Campbell and Reg Connelly, Ted Shapiro
If I Loved You	1945	Oscar Hammerstein II, Richard Rodgers
If I Only Had a Match	1947	Arthur Johnston, George W. Meyer, Lee Morris
If I Should Lose You	1984	Ralph Rainger, Leo Robin
If I Steal a Kiss	1947	Nacio Herb Brown, Edward Heyman
If It's the Last Thing I Do	1956	Sammy Cahn, Saul Chaplin
If Loveliness Were Music	1944	Bert Reisfeld, Mickey Stoner
If Only She'd Look My Way	1950	Alan Melville, Ivor Novello
If This Isn't Love	1954 (film)	Yip Harburg, Burton Lane
If You Are But a Dream	1944, 1957	Nat Bonx, Jack Fulton, Moe Jaffe
If You Never Come to Me	1967	Ray Gilbert, Antonio Carlos Jobim
If You Go Away	1969	Jacques Brel, Rod McKuen
If You Never Come to Me	1967	Ray Gilbert, Antonio Carlos Jobim, Aloysio de Oliveria
If You Please	1943	Johnny Burke, Jimmy Van Heusen
If You Stub Your Toe on the Moon	1949	Johnny Burke, Jimmy Van Heusen
I'll Be Around	1955	Alec Wilder
I'll Be Home for Christmas	1957	Kim Gannon, Walter Kent, Buck Ram
I'll Be Seeing You	1940, 1961, 1961	Sammy Fain, Irving Kahal
I'll Follow My Secret Heart	1962	Noël Coward
I'll Make Up for Everything	1947	Ross Parker
I'll Never Be The Same	1955	Gus Kahn, Matty Malneck, Frank Signorelli
I'll Never Let a Day Pass By	1941	Frank Loesser, Victor Schertzinger
I'll Never Smile Again	1940, 1959, 1965	Ruth Lowe
I'll Only Miss Her When I Think of Her	1965	Sammy Cahn, Jimmy Van Heusen
I'll Remember April	1961	Gene de Paul, Patricia Johnston, Don Raye
I'll See You Again	1961	Noël Coward
I'll See You in My Dreams	1940 (radio)	Isham Jones, Gus Kahn
I'll Take Tallulah	1942	Yip Harburg, Burton Lane
Ill Wind	1955	Harold Arlen, Ted Koehler
I'm a Fool to Want You	1951, 1957	Joel Herron, Frank Sinatra, Jack Wolf
I'm Beginning to See the Light	1962	Duke Ellington, Don George, Johnny Hodges, Harry James
I'm Getting Sentimental Over You	1961	George Bassman, Ned Washington
I'm Glad There Is You	1947	Jimmy Dorsey, Paul Madeira
I'm Gonna Live Till I Die	1954	Manny Curtis, Al Hoffman, Walter Kent
I'm Gonna Make It All the Way	1973	Floyd Huddleston
I'm Gonna Sit Right Down and Write Myself a Letter	1954, 1962	Fred E. Ahlert, Joe Young
I'm in the Mood for Love	1942 (radio)	Dorothy Fields, Jimmy McHugh
I'm Not Afraid	1970	Jacques Brel, Gérard Jouannest, Rod McKuen
I'm Sorry I Made You Cry	1946	N.J. Clesi
I'm Walking Behind You	1953	Billy Reid
Imagination	1940, 1961	Johnny Burke, Jimmy Van Heusen
The Impatient Years	1955	Sammy Cahn, Jimmy Van Heusen
The Impossible Dream	1966	Joe Darion, Mitch Leigh
In the Blue of Evening	1942, 1961	Tom Adair, Alfonso D'Artega
In the Cool, Cool, Cool of the Evening	1964	Hoagy Carmichael, Johnny Mercer
In the Shadow of the Moon	1969	Earl Brown, Heinz Keissling
In the Still of the Night	1960	Cole Porter
In the Wee Small Hours of the Morning	1955, 1963	Bob Hilliard, David Mann
Indian Summer	1967	Al Dubin, Victor Herbert
Indescreet	1962	Sammy Cahn, Jimmy Van Heusen
Innamorata	1957 (television)	Jack Brooks, Harry Warren
Is There a Chance for Me?	1940	William Granzow
Isle of Capri	1957	Wilhelm Grosz, Jimmy Kennedy
Isn't She Lovely?	1979	Stevie Wonder
It All Came True	1947	Sunny Skylar
It All Comes Back to Me Now	1941	Alex Kramer, Joan Whitney Kramer, Hy Zaret
It All Depends on You	1949, 1958, 1960	Buddy G. DeSylva, Lew Brown, Ray Henderson
It Came Upon a Midnight Clear	1947, 1957	Edmund Sears, Richard Storrs Willis
It Came to Me	1940	Louis DePyro
It Could Happen to You	1956	Johnny Burke, Jimmy Van Heusen
It Gets Lonely Early	1965	Sammy Cahn, Jimmy Van Heusen
It Had to Be You	1963, 1979	Isham Jones, Gus Kahn
It Happened in Monterey	1956	Billy Rose, Mabel Wayne
It Happens Every Spring	1949	Mack David, Josef Myrow
It Might as Well Be Spring	1961, 1964	Oscar Hammerstein II, Richard Rodgers
It Never Entered My Mind	1947, 1955, 1981	Lorenz Hart, Richard Rodgers
It Only Happens When I Dance with You	1948	Irving Berlin
It Started All Over Again	1942, 1961	Bill Carey, Carl T. Fischer
It Was a Very Good Year	1965, 1966 (live)	Ervin Drake
It Worries Me	1954	Fritz Schulz-Reichel, Carl Sigman, Ernst Verch
It's a Blue World	1961	Bob Wright, Chet Forrest
It's a Lonesome Old Town	1958	Charles Kisco, Harry Tobias
It's a Long Way (From Your House to My House)	1951	Roy C. Bennett, Sid Tepper
It's a Lovely Day Tomorrow	1940	Irving Berlin
It's a Wonderful World	1961	Harold Adamson, Jan Savitt, Johnny Watson
It's All So New to Me	1941 (radio)	Pearl Black
It's All Right With Me	1959, 1984	Cole Porter
It's All Up to You	1946	Sammy Cahn, Jule Styne
It's Always You	1940, 1961	Johnny Burke, Jimmy Van Heusen)
It's Been a Long, Long Time	1945	Sammy Cahn, Jule Styne
It's Easy to Remember	1956	Lorenz Hart, Richard Rodgers
It's Funny to Everyone but Me	1939	Jack Lawrence
It's Nice to Go Trav'ling	1957	Sammy Cahn, Jimmy Van Heusen
It's Only a Paper Moon	1950, 1960	Harold Arlen, Yip Harburg, Billy Rose
It's Only Money	1951	Sammy Cahn, Jule Styne
It's Over, It's Over, It's Over	1960	Matt Dennis, Don Stanford
It's Sunday	1983	Susan Birkenhead, Jule Styne
It's the Same Old Dream	1946, 1957	Sammy Cahn, Jule Styne
I've Been There	1979	Gordon Jenkins
I've Been to Town	1969	Rod McKuen
I've Got a Crush on You	1947, 1960, 1993	George Gershwin, Ira Gershwin.
I've Got a Home in That Rock	1945	Traditional
I've Got a Restless Spell	1940 (radio)	Nancy Lampe
I've Got My Eyes on You	1940	Cole Porter
I've Got My Love to Keep Me Warm	1960	Irving Berlin
I've Got the World on a String	1953, 1993	Harold Arlen, Ted Koehler
I've Got You Under My Skin	1956, 1963, 1993	Cole Porter
I've Grown Accustomed to Her Face	1962	Alan Jay Lerner, Frederick Loewe
I've Had My Moments	1956	Walter Donaldson, Gus Kahn
I've Heard That Song Before	1961	Sammy Cahn, Jule Styne
I've Lost My Heart Again	1940	Leo Robin
I've Never Been in Love Before	1963	Frank Loesser
Jeepers Creepers	1954	Johnny Mercer, Harry Warren
Jesus is a Rock (In a Weary Land)	1945	Traditional
Jingle Bells	1946, 1957	James Lord Pierpont
June in January	1942 (radio)	Ralph Rainger, Leo Robin
Just an Old Stone House	1945	Alec Wilder
Just as Though You Were Here	1942, 1974	John Benson Brooks, Eddie DeLange
Just Close Your Eyes	1943-8	John M. Elliot, Sam Mineo, Lewis Rodgers
Just for Now	1947	Dick Redmond
Just Friends	1959	Sam M. Lewis, John Klenner
Just in Time	1958	Betty Comden, Adolph Green, Jule Styne
Just One of Those Things	1954, 1961 (live)	Cole Porter
(Just One Way to Say) I Love You	1949	Irving Berlin
Just the Way You Are	1979	Billy Joel
Kiss Me Again	1944	Victor Herbert, Henry Martyn Blossom
Kisses and Tears	1949, 1950	Sammy Cahn, Jule Styne
L.A. Is My Lady	1984	Alan Bergman, Marilyn Bergman, Quincy Jones, Peggy Lipton
Là ci darem la mano	1946	Lorenzo Da Ponte, Wolfgang Amadeus Mozart
Lady Day	1969	Bob Gaudio, Jake Holmes
The Lady from Twentynine Palms	1939	Allie Wrubel
The Lady Is a Tramp	1956, 1993	Lorenz Hart, Richard Rodgers
The Lamp Is Low	1939	Peter DeRose, Mitchell Parish, Maurice Ravel
The Lamplighter's Serenade	1942	Hoagy Carmichael, Paul Francis Webster
The Last Call for Love	1942	Yip Harburg, Burton Lane, M. Cummings
The Last Dance	1958, 1960	Sammy Cahn, Jimmy Van Heusen
Last Night When We Were Young	1954, 1965	Harold Arlen, Yip Harburg
Laura	1947, 1957	Johnny Mercer, David Raksin
Lean Baby	1953	Roy Alfred, Billy May
Learn to Croon	1940 (radio)	Sam Coslow, Arthur Johnston
Learnin' the Blues	1955, 1962	Dolores Vicki Silvers
Leave It All to Me	1988	Paul Anka
Leaving on a Jet Plane	1970	John Denver
Let It Snow! Let It Snow! Let It Snow!	1950	Sammy Cahn, Jule Styne
Let Me Love You Tonight	1943-8	Mitchell Parish, René Touzet
Let Me Try Again	1973	Paul Anka, Sammy Cahn, Romvald Figuier, Michel Jourdan, Caravelli
Let There Be Love	1962 (television)	Ian Grant, Lionel Rand
Let Us Break Bread Together	1964	Roy Ringwald
Let's Do It, Let's Fall in Love	1959	Cole Porter
Let's Face the Music and Dance	1960, 1979	Irving Berlin
Let's Fall in Love	1960	Harold Arlen, Ted Koehler
Let's Get Away from It All	1941, 1957	Tom Adair, Matt Dennis
Let's Put Out the Lights (and Go to Sleep)	1958	Herman Hupfeld
Let's Start the New Year Right	1943	Irving Berlin
Let's Take An Old-Fashioned Walk	1949	Irving Berlin
Life is So Peculiar	1950	Johnny Burke, Jimmy Van Heusen
Life's a Trippy Thing	1970	Howard Greenfield, Linda Laurie
Light a Candle in the Chapel	1942	Duke Leonard, Ed G. Nelson, Harry Pease
Like a Sad Song	1976	John Denver
Like Someone in Love	1953	Johnny Burke, Jimmy Van Heusen
Lilly Belle	1945	Dave Franklin, Irving Taylor
Linda	1977	Jack Lawrence
The Little Drummer Boy	1964	Katherine Kennicott Davis, Henry Onorati, Harry Simeone
Little Girl Blue	1953	Lorenz Hart, Richard Rodgers
Little Green Apples	1968	Bobby Russell
A Little Learning is a Dangerous Thing	1947	D. Jacobs, Sy Oliver
London by Night	1950, 1957, 1962	Carroll Coates
Lonely Town	1957	Leonard Bernstein, Betty Comden, Adolph Green
Lonesome Cities	1969	Rod McKuen
The Lonesome Road	1956	Gene Austin, Nathaniel Shilkret
Long Ago (And Far Away)	1943-8	Ira Gershwin, Jerome Kern
A Long Night	1981	Loonis McGlohon, Alec Wilder
The Look of Love	1962	Sammy Cahn, Jimmy Van Heusen
Look Out for Jimmy Valentine	1967 (television)	Gus Edwards, Edward Madden
Look to Your Heart	1955	Sammy Cahn, Jimmy Van Heusen
Looking at the World Thru Rose Colored Glasses	1962	Tommie Malie, Jimmy Steiger
Looking for Yesterday	1940	Eddie DeLange, Jimmy Van Heusen
The Lord's Prayer	1949	Albert Hay Malotte
Lost in the Stars	1946, 1963	Maxwell Anderson, Kurt Weill
Love and Marriage	1955, 1965	Sammy Cahn, Jimmy Van Heusen
Love Is a Many-Splendored Thing	1964	Sammy Fain, Paul Francis Webster
Love Is Here to Stay	1955	George Gershwin, Ira Gershwin
Love Is Just Around the Corner	1962	Lewis E. Gensler, Leo Robin
(Love Is) The Tender Trap	1955, 1962	Sammy Cahn, Jimmy Van Heusen
Love Isn't Just for the Young	1963	Bernard Knee, Herbert L. Miller
Love Lies	1940	Ralph Freed, Joseph Meyer, Carl Sigman
Love Locked Out	1956	Max Kester, Ray Noble
Love Looks So Well On You	1959	Alan Bergman, Marilyn Bergman, Lew Spence
Love Makes Us Whatever We Want to Be	1982	Sammy Cahn, Jule Styne
Love Me	1951	Ned Washington, Victor Young
Love Me as I Am	1941	Frank Loesser, Louis Alter
Love Me Tender	1979	Elvis Presley, Vera Matson
Love Means Love	1950	Bonnie Lake, Carl Sigman
Love Walked In	1961	George Gershwin, Ira Gershwin
A Lovely Way to Spend an Evening	1943	Harold Adamson, Jimmy McHugh
Lover	1950, 1961	Lorenz Hart, Richard Rodgers
A Lover Is Blue	1940	Charles Carpenter, Jimmy Mundy, James Oliver Young,
Love's Been Good to Me	1969	Rod McKuen
Luck Be a Lady	1963, 1994	Frank Loesser
Luna Rossa (Blushing Moon)	1952	Vincenzo de Crescenzo, Renato Matassa, Antonio Viscione, Kermit Goell
Lush Life	1958	Billy Strayhorn
MacArthur Park	1979	Jimmy Webb
Mack the Knife	1984, 1986, 1994	Bertolt Brecht, Kurt Weill
Mad About You	1949	Ned Washington, Victor Young
Make Believe		Oscar Hammerstein II, Jerome Kern
Makin' Whoopee	1956	Walter Donaldson, Gus Kahn
Mama Will Bark	1951	Dick Manning
Mam'selle	1947, 1960	Mack Gordon, Edmund Goulding
A Man Alone	1969	Rod McKuen
The Man I Love	1957	George Gershwin, Ira Gershwin
The Man in the Looking Glass	1965	Bart Howard
Maria	1962	Leonard Bernstein, Stephen Sondheim
Marie	1940 (radio)	Irving Berlin
Maybe This Time	1995	Fred Ebb, John Kander
Maybe You'll Be There	1957	Rube Bloom, Sammy Gallop
Me and My Shadow	1962	Dave Dreyer, Al Jolson, Billy Rose
Mean to Me	1947	Fred E. Ahlert, Roy Turk
Meditation	1967	Antonio Carlos Jobim, Norman Gimbel, Newton Mendonça
Meet Me at the Copa	1950	Sammy Cahn, Axel Stordahl
Meet Me Tonight in Dreamland	1954 (radio)	Leo Friedman, Beth Slater Whitson
Melancholy Mood	1939	William Schumann, V. Knight
Melody of Love	1954	Hans Engelmann, Tom Glazer
Memories Are Made of This	1957 (television), 1988 (live recording)	Richard Dehr, Terry Gilkyson, Frank Miller
Memories of You	1956, 1961	Eubie Blake, Andy Razaf
Merry Christmas Little Angel	1975	unknown
Michael and Peter	1969	Bob Gaudio, Jake Holmes
Mighty Lak' a Rose	1945	Ethelbert Nevin., Frank Lebby Stanton
A Million Dreams Ago	1961	Eddie Howard, Dick Jurgens, Lew Quadling
Mind if I Make Love to You?	1956	Cole Porter
Mister Booze	1964	Sammy Cahn, Jimmy Van Heusen
Mistletoe and Holly	1957	Hank Sanicola, Frank Sinatra, Doc Stanford
Misty	1961	Johnny Burke, Erroll Garner
Moment to Moment	1965	Henry Mancini, Johnny Mercer
Moments in the Moonlight	1940	Richard Himber, Irving Gordon, Alvin Kaufman
Monday Morning Quarterback	1981	Don Costa, Pamela Phillips-Oland
Monique	1958	Elmer Bernstein, Sammy Cahn
Montmartre, Montmartre	1959	Cole Porter
Mood Indigo	1955	Barney Bigard, Duke Ellington, Irving Mills
Moody River	1968	Gary Bruce
The Moon Got in My Eyes	1965	Johnny Burke, Arthur Johnston
Moon Love	1965	Mack David, André Kostelanetz
Moon River	1964	Henry Mancini, Johnny Mercer
Moon Song	1965	Sam Coslow, Arthur Johnston
The Moon Was Yellow	1945, 1958, 1965	Fred E. Ahlert, Edgar Leslie
The Moon Won't Talk	1941 (radio)	unknown
Moonlight Becomes You	1965	Johnny Burke, Jimmy Van Heusen
Moonlight in Vermont	1957, 1994	John Blackburn, Karl Suessdorf
Moonlight Mood	1965	Harold Adamson, Peter DeRose
Moonlight on the Ganges	1961	Sherman Myers, Chester Wallace
Moonlight Serenade	1965	Glenn Miller, Mitchell Parish
More	1964	Nino Oliviero, Riz Ortolani
The More I See You	1983	Mack Gordon, Harry Warren
More Than You Know	1979	Edward Eliscu, Vincent Youmans, Billy Rose
The Most Beautiful Girl In The World	1966	Lorenz Hart, Richard Rodgers
Mr. Success	1958	Edwin Grienes, Hank Sanicola, Frank Sinatra
Mrs. Robinson	1969	Paul Simon
The Music Stopped	1943, 1946, 1947	Harold Adamson, Jimmy McHugh
My Baby Just Cares for Me	1966	Walter Donaldson, Gus Kahn
My Blue Heaven	1950, 1960	Walter Donaldson, George A. Whiting
My Buddy	1939	Walter Donaldson, Gus Kahn
My Cousin Louella	1947	Bernard Bierman, Jack Manus
My First Edition	1941	Carol Bailey
My Foolish Heart	1988	Ned Washington, Victor Young
My Funny Valentine	1953, 1994	Lorenz Hart, Richard Rodgers
My Girl	1952	Charles Freed
My Heart Stood Still	1963	Lorenz Hart, Richard Rodgers
My Kind of Girl	1962	Leslie Bricusse
My Kind of Town (Chicago Is)	1964, 1966 (live), 1974 (live), 1994	Sammy Cahn, Jimmy Van Heusen
My Love for You	1947	Abner Silver, Sid Wayne
My Memoirs	1941 (radio)	Ferguson, Greenough
My Melancholy Baby	1945	Ernie Burnett, George A. Norton
My One and Only Love	1953	Robert Mellin, Guy Wood
My Romance	1946, 1947	Lorenz Hart, Richard Rodgers
My Shawl	1945	Stanley Adams, Xavier Cugat
My Shining Hour	1979	Harold Arlen, Johnny Mercer
My Silent Love	1942	Edward Heyman, Isham Jones, Dana Suesse
My Sweet Lady	1970	John Denver
My Way	1969, 1994	Paul Anka, Claude François, Jacques Revaux
My Way Of Life	1968	Bert Kaempfert, Herbert Rehbein, Carl Sigman
Name It and It's Yours	1961	Sammy Cahn, Jimmy Van Heusen
Nancy (With the Laughing Face)	1944, 1945, 1963, 1977	Phil Silvers, Jimmy Van Heusen
Nature Boy	1948	Eden Ahbez
The Nearness of You	1947, 1960	Hoagy Carmichael, Ned Washington
Necessity	1954 (film)	Yip Harburg, Burton Lane
Neiani	1941	Sy Oliver, Axel Stordahl
New York, New York	1979	Fred Ebb, John Kander
Nevertheless (I'm in Love with You)	1950, 1960	Bert Kalmar, Harry Ruby
Nice 'n' Easy	1960	Alan Bergman, Marilyn Bergman, Lew Spence
Nice Work if You Can Get It	1956, 1962	George Gershwin, Ira Gershwin
Night (spoken)	1969	Rod McKuen
Night After Night	1949	Sammy Cahn, Axel Stordahl, Paul Weston
Night and Day	1942, 1947, 1956, 1961, 1977	Cole Porter
The Night Is Young and You're So Beautiful	1945	Irving Kahal, Billy Rose, Dana Suesse
The Night We Called it a Day	1942, 1947, 1957	Tom Adair, Matt Dennis
A Nightingale Sang in Berkeley Square	1962	Eric Maschwitz, Manning Sherwin
No One Ever Tells You	1956	Hub Atwood, Carroll Coates
No Orchids for My Lady	1948	Jack Strachey, Alan Stranks
Noah	1973	Joe Raposo
Nobody Wins	1973	Kris Kristofferson
None But the Lonely Heart	1946, 1947, 1959	Pëtr Il´ic Cajkovskij
Not as a Stranger	1955	Buddy Kaye, Jimmy Van Heusen
Not So Long Ago	1940	Clay A. Boland, Bickley Reichner
Nothing But the Best	1962	Johnny Rotella
Nothing in Common	1958	Sammy Cahn, Jimmy Van Heusen
Now Is the Hour	1962	Maewa Kaihau, Clement Scott, Dorothy Stewart.
O Little Town of Bethlehem	1947, 1957	Phillips Brooks, Lewis Redner
Ode to Billie Joe	1967 (television)	Bobbie Gentry
Oh Bess, Oh Where's My Bess?	1946	George Gershwin, DuBose Heyward
Oh, Babe, What Would You Say?	1975	Eileen Sylvia Smith
Oh How I Miss You Tonight	1962	Benny Davis, Joe Burke, Mark Fisher.
Oh Marie	1957 (television), 1988 (live recording)	Eduardo Di Capua
Oh! Look at Me Now	1941, 1956	Joe Bushkin, John DeVries
Oh, What a Beautiful Mornin'	1943	Oscar Hammerstein II, Richard Rodgers
Oh! What It Seemed to Be	1945, 1963	Bennie Benjamin, Frankie Carle, George David Weiss
Oh, You Crazy Moon	1965	Johnny Burke, Jimmy Van Heusen
Old MacDonald Had a Farm	1960	Traditional
Ol' Man River	1944, 1963	Oscar Hammerstein II, Jerome Kern
Old Devil Moon	1956, 1963	Yip Harburg, Burton Lane
An Old Fashioned Christmas	1964	Sammy Cahn, Jimmy Van Heusen
The Old Master Painter	1949	Haven Gillespie, Beasley Smith
Old School Teacher	1945	Willard Robison
The Oldest Established (Permanent Floating Crap Game in New York)	1963	Frank Loesser
On a Clear Day (You Can See Forever)	1966	Burton Lane, Alan Jay Lerner
On a Little Street in Singapore	1939	Billy Hill, Peter DeRose
On the Road to Mandalay	1957	Rudyard Kipling, Oley Speaks
On the Sunny Side of the Street	1961	Dorothy Fields, Jimmy McHugh
Once I Loved	1967	Ray Gilbert, Antonio Carlos Jobim, Vinicius de Moraes
Once in a While	1940	Michael Edwards, Bud Green
Once in Love with Amy	1948	Frank Loesser
(Once Upon a) Moonlight Night	1946	Irving Bibo, Sidney Clare
Once Upon a Time	1965	Lee Adams, Charles Strouse
One Finger Melody	1950	Kermit Goell, Al Hoffman, Fred Spielman
One for My Baby (and One More for the Road)	1947, 1958, 1993	Harold Arlen, Johnny Mercer
The One I Love (Belongs to Somebody Else)	1940, 1959, 1961	Isham Jones, Gus Kahn
One Love	1946	Leo Robin, David Rose
One Note Samba	1969	Antonio Carlos Jobim, Newton Mendonça
One Red Rose	1941 (radio)	Willard Moyle
The Only Couple on the Floor	1975	Irving Daine, Johnny Durrill
Only Forever	1940 (radio)	Johnny Burke, James Monaco
Only One to a Customer	1986	Carolyn Leigh, Jule Styne
Only the Lonely	1958	Sammy Cahn, Jimmy Van Heusen
Opening Theme	1940 (radio)	unknown
Orange	1956	Nelson Riddle
Our Love	1939	Buddy Bernier, Robert Emmerich, Larry Clinton
Our Love Affair	1940	Roger Freed, Roger Edens
Our Town	1955	Sammy Cahn, Jimmy Van Heusen
Out Beyond the Window (spoken)	1969	Rod McKuen
Out of Nowhere	1942 (radio)	Johnny Green, Edward Heyman
Over the Rainbow	1945	Harold Arlen, Yip Harburg
Pale Moon	1941	Frederic Knight Logan, Jesse G. M. Glick
Paper Doll	1961	Johnny S. Black
Paradise	1945	Nacio Herb Brown, Gordon Clifford
Pass Me By	1964	Cy Coleman, Carolyn Leigh
Peachtree Street	1950	Jimmy Saunders, Frank Sinatra, Leni Mason
Pennies from Heaven	1956, 1962	Johnny Burke, Arthur Johnston
People Will Say We're in Love	1943	Oscar Hammerstein II, Richard Rodgers
Pick Yourself Up	1962	Dorothy Fields, Jerome Kern
Please Be Kind	1962	Sammy Cahn, Saul Chaplin
Please Don't Talk About Me When I'm Gone	1961	Sidney Clare, Sam H. Stept
Pocketful of Miracles	1961	Sammy Cahn, Jimmy Van Heusen
Poinciana	1946, 1947	Buddy Bernier, Nat Simon
Polka Dots and Moonbeams	1940, 1961	Johnny Burke, Jimmy Van Heusen
Poor Butterfly	1967	John Golden, Raymond Hubbell
Poor You	1942	Yip Harburg, Burton Lane
Prairie Night	1941 (radio)	unknown
Pretty Colors	1968	Al Gorgoni, Chip Taylor
A Pretty Girl is Like a Melody	1942 (radio)	Irving Berlin
Prisoner of Love	1961	Russ Columbo, Clarence Gaskill, Leo Robin
P.S. I Love You	1956	Gordon Jenkins, Johnny Mercer
Purple	1956	Billy May
Put Your Dreams Away (For Another Day)	1945, 1957, 1963	Ruth Lowe, Paul Mann, Stephan Weiss
Quiet Nights of Quiet Stars	1967	Antonio Carlos Jobim, Gene Lees
Rain (Falling From The Skies)	1953	Gunther Finlay, Robert Mellin
Rain in My Heart	1968	Victoria Pike, Teddy Randazzo
Reaching for the Moon	1965	Irving Berlin
Red	1956	André Previn
Remember	1962, 1978	Irving Berlin
Remember Me in Your Dreams	1950	Hal David, Morty Nevins
The Right Girl for Me	1949	Betty Comden, Roger Edens, Adolph Green
Ring-a-Ding-Ding!	1960	Sammy Cahn, Jimmy Van Heusen
River Stay 'Way from My Door	1960	Matt Dixon, Harry M. Woods
Roses of Picardy	1962	Frederic Weatherly, Haydn Wood
The Saddest Thing of All	1974, 1975	Pierre Leroyer, Michel Legrand, Edward Ruault, Carl Sigman
Same Old Saturday Night	1955	Sammy Cahn, Frank Reardon
Same Old Song and Dance	1958	Sammy Cahn, Jimmy Van Heusen, Bobby Worth
Sand and Sea	1966	Gilbert Bécaud, Mack David, Maurice Vidalin
Santa Claus Is Coming to Town	1947	John Frederick Coots, Haven Gillespie
Satin Doll		Duke Ellington, Johnny Mercer, Billy Strayhorn
Satisfy Me One More Time	1974	Floyd Huddleston
Saturday Night (Is the Loneliest Night of the Week)	1944, 1958	Sammy Cahn, Jule Styne
Say Hello!	1981	Richard Behrke, Sammy Cahn
Say It	1940	Jimmy McHugh, Frank Loesser
Searching	1982, 1983	Sammy Cahn, Jule Styne
The Sea Song	1954	Dorothy Fields, Arthur Schwartz
The Second Time Around	1960, 1963,	Sammy Cahn, Jimmy Van Heusen
Secret Love	1964	Sammy Fain, Paul Francis Webster
See the Show Again	1994	Barry Manilow, Adrienne Anderson
Send in the Clowns	1973, 1976	Stephen Sondheim
Senorita (I Offer You the Moon)	1947	Nacio Herb Brown, Edward Heyman
Sentimental Baby	1960	Alan Bergman, Marilyn Bergman, Lew Spence
Sentimental Journey	1961	Les Brown, Arthur Green, Ben Homer
September in the Rain	1960	Al Dubin, Harry Warren
The September of My Years	1965	Sammy Cahn, Jimmy Van Heusen
September Song	1946, 1961, 1965	Maxwell Anderson, Kurt Weill
Serenade in Blue	1962	Mack Gordon, Harry Warren
Serenade of the Bells		Al Goodhart, Kay Twomey, Al Urbano
Shadows on the Sand	1940	Stanley Adams, Will Grosz
The Shadow of Your Smile	1966	Johnny Mandel, Paul Francis Webster
Shake Down the Stars	1940	Eddie DeLange, Jimmy Van Heusen
She Says	1969	Bob Gaudio, Jake Holmes
Sheila	1950	Christopher R. Hayward, Frank Sinatra, Robert B. Staver
She's Funny That Way	1944, 1960	Neil Moret, Richard A. Whiting
Should I?	1950, 1960	Arthur Freed, Nacio Herb Brown
Side by Side	1957 (television), 1988 (live recording)	Harry M. Woods
Silent Night	1945, 1957, 1991	Traditional
Silver	1956	Elmer Bernstein
Since Marie Has Left Paree	1964	Hy Glaser, Jerry Solomon
The Single Man	1969	Rod McKuen
A Sinner Kissed an Angel	1941	Mack David, Larry Shayne
The Sky Fell Down	1940	Louis Alter, Edward Heyman
Sleep Warm	1958	Alan Bergman, Marilyn Bergman, Lew Spence
Sleepy Time Gal	1958	Joseph R. Alden, Raymond B. Egan, Ange Lorenzo, Richard A. Whiting
On a Slow Boat to China	1957 (television)	Frank Loesser
Slow Dance	1945	Alec Wilder
Speak Low	1943-8	Ogden Nash, Kurt Weill
Snootie Little Cutie	1942	Bobby Troup
So Far	1947	Oscar Hammerstein II, Richard Rodgers
So in Love	1963	Cole Porter
So Long, My Love	1957	Sammy Cahn, Lew Spence
So They Tell Me	1946	J. Gale, Arthur Kent, Harold Mott
So You're the One	1941 (radio)	unknown
Softly As I Leave You	1964	Giorgio Calabrese, Tony De Vita, Hal Shaper.
Soliloquy	1946, 1955, 1963	Oscar Hammerstein II, Richard Rodgers
Some Enchanted Evening	1949, 1963, 1967	Oscar Hammerstein II, Richard Rodgers
Some of Your Sweetness (Got into My Heart)	1940 (radio)	G. Clayborn, J. Clayborn
Some Other Time (I Could Resist You)	1944	Sammy Cahn, Jule Styne
Some Other Time (We'll Catch Up)		Leonard Bernstein, Betty Comden, Adolph Green
Some Traveling Music (spoken)	1969	Rod McKuen
Somebody Loves Me	1940	Buddy DeSylva, George Gershwin, Ballard MacDonald
Someone to Light Up My Life	1969	Antonio Carlos Jobim, Gene Lees, Vinícius de Moraes
Someone To Watch Over Me	1945, 1954	George Gershwin, Ira Gershwin
Somethin' Stupid	1967	Carson Parks
Something	1970, 1979	George Harrison
Something Old, Something New	1946	Ramey Idriss, George Tibbles
Something Wonderful	1957, 1962	Oscar Hammerstein II, Richard Rodgers,
Something Wonderful Happens in Summer	1956, 1957	Joe Bushkin, John DeVries
Something's Gotta Give	1958	Johnny Mercer
Somewhere a Voice is Calling	1942	Eileen Newton, Arthur F. Tate
Somewhere Along the Way	1961	Kurt Adams, Sammy Gallop
Somewhere in the Night	1946	Mack Gordon, Josef Myrow
Somewhere in Your Heart	1964	Russell Faith, Clarence Keltner
Somewhere My Love (Lara's Theme)	1966	Maurice Jarre, Paul Francis Webster
The Song is Ended (but the Melody Lingers On)	1962	Irving Berlin, Beda Loehner
The Song Is You	1942, 1946, 1947, 1958, 1979	Oscar Hammerstein II, Jerome Kern
Song of the Sabia	1969	Chico Buarque, Norman Gimbel, Antonio Carlos Jobim
Song Sung Blue	1979	Neil Diamond
Song Without Words	1979	Gordon Jenkins
The Song's Gotta Come from the Heart	1946 (film)	Sammy Cahn, Jule Styne
Sonny Boy	1944 (radio)	Lew Brown, Buddy DeSylva, Ray Henderson, Al Jolson
Sorry	1949	Buddy Pepper, Richard A. Whiting
South of the Border	1953	Michael Carr, Jimmy Kennedy
South - To a Warmer Place	1981	Loonis McGlohon, Alec Wilder
S'posin'	1947, 1960	Paul Denniker, Andy Razaf
Spring Is Here	1947, 1958	Lorenz Hart, Richard Rodgers
Star	1968	Sammy Cahn, Jimmy Van Heusen
Stardust	1940, 1961	Hoagy Carmichael, Mitchell Parish
Stargazer	1976	Neil Diamond
Stars Fell on Alabama	1956	Mitchell Parish, Frank Perkins
Stars in Your Eyes	1945	Mort Greene, Ricardo López Méndez, Gabriel Ruiz (composer)
Stay with Me (Main Theme from The Cardinal)	1963	Carolyn Leigh, Jerome Moross
The Stars Will Remember	1947	Don Pelosi, Leo Towers
Stella by Starlight	1947	Ned Washington, Victor Young
Stompin' at the Savoy	1967 (television)	Benny Goodman, Edgar Sampson, Chick Webb
Stormy Weather	1944, 1959, 1984	Harold Arlen, Ted Koehler
Strange Music	1946, 1947	Edvard Grieg
Strangers in the Night	1966	Bert Kaempfert, Charles Singleton, Eddie Snyder
Street of Dreams	1942, 1979	Sam M. Lewis, Victor Young
(On the Island of) Stromboli	1949, 1964	K. Lane, Taylor
Style	1964	Sammy Cahn, Jimmy Van Heusen
The Summer Knows	1974	Alan Bergman, Marilyn Bergman, Michel Legrand
Summer Me, Winter Me	1979	Alan Bergman, Marilyn Bergman, Michel Legrand
Summer Wind	1966, 1993	Heinz Meier, Johnny Mercer
Sunday	1954	Chester Conn, Bennie Krueger, Ned Miller, Jule Styne
Sunday, Monday or Always	1943	Johnny Burke, Jimmy Van Heusen
Sunflower	1948	Mack David, Russ Morgan
Sunny	1967	Bobby Hebb
Sunrise in the Morning	1970	Paul Ryan
Sunrise Over Taxco	1941 (radio)	Elliot, Pardue
Sunshine Cake	1949	Johnny Burke, Jimmy Van Heusen
The Sunshine of Your Smile	1941	Leonard Cooke, Lillian Ray
Sure Thing	1949	Johnny Burke, Jimmy Van Heusen
The Surrey with the Fringe on Top	1945, 1980	Oscar Hammerstein II, Richard Rodgers
Sweet and Lovely	1983	Gus Arnheim, Neil Moret, Harry Tobias
Sweet Caroline	1974	Neil Diamond
Sweet Chariot	1963 (live recording)	Duke Ellington, Irving Mills
Sweet Lorraine	1946, 1977	Cliff Burwell, Mitchell Parish
The Sweetheart of Sigma Chi	1957 (radio)	Bryan Stokes, F. Dudleigh Vernor
Swinging on a Star	1964	Johnny Burke, Jimmy Van Heusen
Swingin' Down the Lane	1956	Isham Jones, Gus Kahn
Take a Chance	1953	David Raksin, Don Stanford
Take Me	1942, 1961	Rube Bloom, Mack David
Take Me Out to the Ball Game	1946 (film)	Jack Norworth, Albert Von Tilzer
Take My Love	1950	Joel Herron, Frank Sinatra, Jack Wolf
Take the A Train	1965 (television)	Billy Strayhorn
Taking a Chance on Love	1954	Vernon Duke, John Latouche, Ted Fetter
Talk to Me	1959	Eddie Snyder, Rudy Vallee, Stanley Kahan
Talk to Me Baby	1963	Robert E. Dolan, Johnny Mercer
Tammy	1962	Jay Livingston, Ray Evans
Tangerine	1962	Johnny Mercer, Victor Schertzinger
Tea for Two	1946 (radio), 1947	Irving Caesar, Vincent Youmans
Teach Me Tonight	1984	Sammy Cahn, Gene De Paul
Tell Her You Love Her	1957	Homer Denison, Hugh Halliday, Sol Parker
Tell Her (You Love Her Each Day)	1965	Samuel Ward, Charles Watkins
Tell Me at Midnight	1940	Clay A. Boland, Bickley Reichner
Tenderly	1980	Walter Gross, Jack Lawrence
Tennessee News Boy (The Newsboy Blues)	1952	Percy Faith, Dick Manning
Thanks for the Memory	1981	Leo Robin, Ralph Rainger
That Great Come and Get It Day	1954 (film)	Yip Harburg, Burton Lane
That Lucky Old Sun	1949	Haven Gillespie, Beasley Smith
That Old Black Magic	1946, 1961, 1975	Harold Arlen, Johnny Mercer
That Old Feeling	1947, 1960	Lew Brown, Sammy Fain
That's All	1961	Alan Brandt, Bob Haymes
That's For Me	1945	Oscar Hammerstein II, Richard Rodgers
That's How Much I Love You	1946	Eddy Arnold, Wally Fowler
That's How It Goes	1941 (radio)	L. Martin, M. Gentile
That's Life	1966	Kelly Gordon, Dean Kay
That's What God Looks Like to Me	1978, 1979	Lois Irwin, Lan O'Kun
Them There Eyes	1982	Maceo Pinkard, Doris Tauber, William Tracey
Theme from New York, New York	1979, 1993	Fred Ebb, John Kander
Theme and Variations	1945	Alec Wilder
Then I'll Be Tired of You	1957	Yip Harburg, Arthur Schwartz
Then Suddenly Love	1964	Roy Alfred, Paul Vance
There Are Such Things	1942, 1961	Stanley Adams, Abel Baer, George W. Meyer
There But for You Go I	1947	Alan Jay Lerner, Frederick Loewe
There Goes That Song Again	1943	Sammy Cahn, Jule Styne
There I Go	1941 (radio)	Weiser, Hy Zaret
There Used to Be a Ballpark	1973	Joe Raposo
There Will Never Be Another You	1961	Mack Gordon, Harry Warren
(There'll Be a) Hot Time in the Town of Berlin	1943-8	Joe Bushkin, John DeVries
There's a Flaw in My Flue	1956	Sammy Cahn, Jimmy Van Heusen
There's a Long Long Trail	1954 (radio), 1957 (television)	Alonzo Elliot, Stoddard King
There's a Small Hotel	1957	Lorenz Hart, Richard Rodgers
There's No Business Like Show Business	1946 (radio)	Irving Berlin
There's No You	1944, 1957	Tom Adair, Hal Hopper
There's Something Missing	1950, 1951	Rule, O'Brien, Bennie Benjamin, George David Weiss, Downey
These Boots Are Made for Walkin'	1966 (television)	Lee Hazlewood
These Foolish Things (Remind Me of You)	1945, 1961	Eric Maschwitz, Jack Strachey
They All Laughed	1979	George Gershwin, Ira Gershwin
They Came to Cordura	1958	Sammy Cahn, Jimmy Van Heusen
They Can't Take That Away from Me	1953, 1962, 1993	George Gershwin, Ira Gershwin
They Say It's Wonderful	1946	Irving Berlin
The Things I Love	1941 (radio)	H. Barlow, L. Harris, Peter Ilich Tchaikovsky
The Things We Did Last Summer	1946	Sammy Cahn, Jule Styne
This Can't Be Love	1949 (radio), 1958 (television)	Lorenz Hart, Richard Rodgers
This Happy Madness (Estrada Branca)	1969	Antonio Carlos Jobim, Gene Lees, Vinicius de Moraes
This Is All I Ask	1965	Gordon Jenkins
This Is My Love	1967	James Harbert
This Is My Song	1967	Charlie Chaplin
This Is No Dream	1939	Benny Davis, Tommy Dorsey, Ted Shapiro
This Is the Beginning of the End	1940	Mack Gordon
This Is the Night	1946	Louis Bellin, Redd Evans
This Love of Mine	1941, 1955	Barry Parker, Henry W. Sanicola, Frank Sinatra
This Nearly Was Mine	1963	Oscar Hammerstein II, Richard Rodgers
This Town	1967	Lee Hazlewood
This Was My Love	1959	Jim Harbert
Three Coins in the Fountain	1954, 1964	Sammy Cahn, Jule Styne
Tie a Yellow Ribbon Round the Ole Oak Tree	1974	L. Russell Brown, Irwin Levine
Till We Meet Again	1954 (radio)	Raymond B. Egan, Richard A. Whiting
Time After Time	1946, 1957	Sammy Cahn, Jule Styne
Tina	1960	Sammy Cahn, Jimmy Van Heusen
To Love a Child	1981	Hal David, Joe Raposo
To Love and Be Loved	1958	Sammy Cahn, Jimmy Van Heusen
Together	1962	Lew Brown, Buddy De Sylva, Ray Henderson
Tony Rome	1967 (television)	Lee Hazlewood
Too Close for Comfort	1958	Jerry Bock, Larry Holofcener, George David Weiss
Too Marvelous for Words	1956	Johnny Mercer, Richard A. Whiting
Too Romantic	1940	Johnny Burke, James Monaco
Trade Winds	1940	Cliff Friend, Charles Tobias
The Train	1969	Bob Gaudio, Jake Holmes
Triste	1969	Antonio Carlos Jobim
Try a Little Tenderness	1945, 1960	Jimmy Campbell and Reg Connelly, Harry M. Woods
The Twelve Days Of Christmas	1968	Traditional
Twin Soliloquies (Wonder How it Feels)	1963	Oscar Hammerstein II, Richard Rodgers
Two Hearts are Better Than One	1946	Oscar Hammerstein II, Jerome Kern
Two Hearts, Two Kisses (Make One Love)	1955	Henry Stone, Otis Williams
Two in Love	1941	Meredith Willson
Until the Real Thing Comes Along	1984	Sammy Cahn, Saul Chaplin, L.E. Freeman
Up, Up and Away	1967 (television)	Jimmy Webb
Violets for Your Furs	1941, 1953	Tom Adair, Matt Dennis
The Very Thought of You	1962	Ray Noble
Volare	1980 (live recording)	Franco Migliacci, Domenico Modugno
Wait for Me (Johnny Concho Theme)	1956	Nelson Riddle, Dok Stanford
Wait Till You See Her	1956	Lorenz Hart, Richard Rodgers
Walk Away	1973	Elmer Bernstein, Carolyn Leigh
Walking Down to Washington	1961	unknown
Walkin' in the Sunshine	1952	Bob Merrill
Wandering	1968	Gayle Caldwell
Was the Last Time I Saw You (The Last Time)	1943-8	Marjorie Goetschius, Edna Osser
Watch What Happens	1969	Jacques Demy, Norman Gimbel, Michel Legrand
Drinking Water (Agua de Beber)	1969	Antonio Carlos Jobim, Norman Gimbel, Vinicius de Moraes
Watertown	1969	Bob Gaudio, Jake Holmes
Wave	1969	Antonio Carlos Jobim
The Way You Look Tonight	1964	Dorothy Fields, Jerome Kern
We Just Couldn't Say Goodbye	1947	Harry M. Woods
We Kiss in a Shadow	1951	Oscar Hammerstein II, Richard Rodgers
We Open in Venice	1963	Cole Porter
We Three (My Echo, My Shadow, and Me)	1940	Nelson Cogane, Sammy Mysels, Dick Robertson
We Wish You the Merriest	1964	Les Brown
The Wedding of Lili Marlene	1949	Tommie Connor, Johnny Reine
Weep They Will	1955	Bill Carey, Carl T. Fischer
Well, Did You Evah!	1956	Cole Porter
We'll Be Together Again	1956	Carl T. Fischer, Frankie Laine
We'll Gather Lilacs in the Spring	1962	Ivor Novello
We'll Meet Again	1962	Hughie Charles, Ross Parker
We're Glad That We're Italian	1959 (live recording)	Sammy Cahn
We're Just a Kiss Apart	1949	Leo Robin, Jule Styne
What a Funny Girl (You Used to Be)	1969	Bob Gaudio, Jake Holmes
What Are You Doing the Rest of Your Life?	1974	Alan Bergman, Marilyn Bergman, Michel Legrand
What Do I Care for a Dame?	1957	Lorenz Hart, Richard Rodgers
What Is This Thing Called Love?	1955	Cole Porter
What Makes the Sunset?	1944	Sammy Cahn, Jule Styne
What Now My Love	1966, 1993	Gilbert Bécaud, Pierre Leroyer, Carl Sigman
What Time Does the Next Miracle Leave?	1979	Gordon Jenkins
Whatever Happened to Christmas?	1968	Jimmy Webb
What'll I Do	1947, 1962	Irving Berlin
What's New?	1958	Johnny Burke, Bob Haggart
What's Now is Now	1969	Bob Gaudio, Jake Holmes
When I Lost You	1962	Irving Berlin
When Daylight Dawns	1941 (radio)	Bea Huberdo
When I Stop Loving You	1954	Cates, Copeland, Green,
When I Take My Sugar to Tea	1960	Sammy Fain, Irving Kahal, Pierre Norman
When I'm Not Near the Girl I Love	1963	Yip Harburg, Burton Lane
When is Sometime?	1947	Johnny Burke, Jimmy Van Heusen
When Joanna Loved Me	1987 (live recording)	Jack Segal, Robert Wells
When Love Comes Again	1941	Gerry Deane, Lou Halmy
When No One Cares	1959	Sammy Cahn, Jimmy Van Heusen
When Sleepy Stars Begin to Fall	1941 (radio)	Sibyl Allen
When Somebody Loves You	1965	Sammy Cahn, Jimmy Van Heusen
When the Sun Goes Down	1950	Walter O'Keefe, Irvine C. Orton
When the Wind Was Green	1965	Henry Stinson
When the World Was Young	1961	Johnny Mercer, M. Philippe-Gerard, Angele Marie T. Vannier
When You Awake	1940, 1947	Henry Nemo
When Your Lover Has Gone	1944, 1955	Einar Aaron Swan
When You're Smiling	1950, 1960	Mark Fisher, Joe Goodwin, Larry Shay,
Where Are You?	1957	Harold Adamson, Jimmy McHugh
Where Do You Go?	1959	Arnold Sundgaard, Alec Wilder
Where Do You Keep Your Heart?	1940	Fred E. Ahlert, Al Stillman
Where is the One?	1947, 1957	Edwin Finckel, Alec Wilder
Where or When	1945, 1958, 1994	Lorenz Hart, Richard Rodgers
While the Angelus Was Ringing	1948	Jean Villard, Dick Manning
Whispering	1940	Richard Coburn, Vincent Rose, John Schonberger
White	1956	Victor Young
White Christmas	1944, 1947, 1954	Irving Berlin
Who	1940 (radio)	Oscar Hammerstein II, Otto Harbach, Jerome Kern
Who Told You I Cared?	1939	Bert Reisfeld, George Whiting
Who Wants to be a Millionaire?	1956	Cole Porter
Why Am I Still Dreaming?	1940 (radio)	unknown
Why Can't You Behave?	1948	Cole Porter
Why Remind Me?	1949	Doris Tauber, Sis Willner
Why Should I Cry Over You?	1953	Chester Conn, Ned Miller
Why Shouldn't I?	1945	Cole Porter
Why Shouldn't it Happen to Us?	1946	Mann Holiner, Alberta Nichols
Why Try to Change Me Now?	1952, 1959	Cy Coleman, Joseph A. McCarthy
Why Was I Born?	1947	Oscar Hammerstein II, Jerome Kern
Willow Weep for Me	1958	Ann Ronell
Winchester Cathedral	1966	Geoff Stephens
Winners	1973	Joe Raposo
Winter Wonderland	1949	Felix Bernard, Richard B. Smith
Wishing Will Make It So	1939	Buddy DeSylva
Witchcraft	1957, 1963, 1993	Cy Coleman, Carolyn Leigh
With Every Breath I Take	1956	Ralph Rainger, Leo Robin
Without a Song	1941, 1961	Edward Eliscu, Billy Rose, Vincent Youmans
Wives and Lovers	1964	Burt Bacharach, Hal David
The World Is in My Arms	1940	Yip Harburg, Burton Lane
World War None	1979	Gordon Jenkins
The World We Knew (Over and Over)	1967	Bert Kaempfert, Herbert Rehbein, Carl Sigman
Wrap Your Troubles In Dreams	1954	Harry Barris, Ted Koehler, Billy Moll
Ya Better Stop	1953	Cliff Ferre, Mark McIntyre
Yearning (Just For You)	1940	Joe Burke, Benny Davis
Yellow	1956	Jeff Alexander
Yellow Days	1967	Alan Bernstein, Alarcon Carrillo
Yes Indeed	1945 (radio), 1958 (TV), 1961	Sy Oliver
Yes Sir, That's My Baby	1966	Walter Donaldson, Gus Kahn
Yesterday	1969	John Lennon, Paul McCartney
Yesterdays	1961	Otto Harbach, Jerome Kern
You and I	1941	Meredith Willson
You and Me	1978, 1979	Peter Allen, Carole Bayer Sager
You and the Night and the Music	1960	Howard Dietz, Arthur Schwartz
You Are My Sunshine	1944 (radio)	Jimmie Davis, Charles Mitchell
You Are the Sunshine of My Life	1974, 1975	Stevie Wonder
You Are There	1967	Harry Sukman, Paul Francis Webster
You Are Too Beautiful	1945	Lorenz Hart, Richard Rodgers
You Brought a New Kind of Love to Me	1956, 1963	Pierre Connor, Sammy Fain, Irving Kahal
You Can Take My Word for It, Baby	1946	Ticker Freeman, Irving Taylor
You Cast a Spell Over Me	1940 (radio)	unknown
You Don't Remind Me	1950	Cole Porter
You Do Something to Me	1950, 1960	Cole Porter
You Forgot All the Words	1955	Bernie Wayne, E.H. Jay
You Go to My Head	1945, 1960	J. Fred Coots, Haven Gillespie
You Got the Best of Me	1941	Joy Font
You Lucky People, You	1941	Johnny Burke, Jimmy Van Heusen
You Make Me Feel So Young	1956, 1993	Mack Gordon, Josef Myrow
You Might Have Belonged to Another	1941	P. West, L. Harmon
You Must Believe In Spring	1982	Alan Bergman, Marilyn Bergman, Jacques Demy, Michel Legrand
You Must Have Been a Beautiful Baby	1959 (television)	Johnny Mercer, Harry Warren
You, My Love	1954	Mack Gordon, Jimmy Van Heusen
You Never Had It So Good	1964	Sammy Cahn, Jimmy Van Heusen
You Really Fill the Bill	1940	Warren Hull
You Turned My World Around	1974	Kim Carnes, Bert Kaempfert, Herbert Rehbein, David Ellingson
You Walk By	1940 (radio)	unknown
You Will Be My Music	1973	Joe Raposo
You'd Be So Easy to Love	1960	Cole Porter
You'd Be So Nice to Come Home To	1956	Cole Porter
You'll Always Be the One I Love	1957	Sunny Skylar, Ticker Freeman
You'll Get Yours	1955	Jimmy Van Heusen, Don Stanford
You'll Know it When it Happens	1946	J.J. Loeb, Carmen Lombardo
You'll Never Know	1943	Mack Gordon, Harry Warren
You'll Never Walk Alone	1945, 1963	Oscar Hammerstein II, Richard Rodgers
Young At Heart	1953, 1963	Carolyn Leigh, Johnny Richards
Younger Than Springtime	1967	Oscar Hammerstein II, Richard Rodgers
Your Cheatin' Heart	1952	Hank Williams
Your Love for Me	1956	Sol Parker
You're a Lucky Fellow, Mr. Smith	1964	Francis Burke, Hughie Prince, Don Raye
You're Breaking My Heart (All Over Again)	1940	James Cavanaugh, Arthur Altman, John Redmond
You're Cheatin' Yourself (If You're Cheatin' on Me)	1957	Al Hoffman, Dick Manning
You're Driving Me Crazy	1966	Walter Donaldson
You're Getting to Be a Habit With Me	1956	Al Dubin, Harry Warren
You're Gonna Hear from Me	1966	André Previn, Dory Previn
You're Lonely and I'm Lonely	1940	Irving Berlin
You're My Girl	1947	Sammy Cahn, Jule Styne
You're Nobody till Somebody Loves You	1961	James Cavanaugh, Russ Morgan, Larry Stock
You're Part of My Heart	1941 (radio)	Virginia Sloane
You're Sensational	1956	Cole Porter
You're Stepping on My Toes	1941 (radio)	Robert Terry
You're So Right (For What's Wrong in My Life)	1973	Victoria Pike, Teddy Randazzo, Roger Joyce
You're the One (For Me)	1951	Ned Washington, Victor Young
You're the Top	1944 (radio)	Cole Porter
Yours Is My Heart Alone	1940	Ludwig Herzer, Franz Lehár, Fritz Löhner-Beda
Zing! Went the Strings of My Heart	1960	James F. Hanley
Zip-A-Dee-Doo-Dah	1951	Ray Gilbert
