= The Columbia Years 1943–1952: The Complete Recordings =

Box set by Frank Sinatra
- Released: October 5, 1993
- Recorded: June 7, 1943–September 17, 1952
- Genre: Traditional pop
- Length: 860:25
- Label: Columbia Legacy Recordings/Sony Music
- Producer: Didier C. Deutsch* (See additional producer credits below)

Frank Sinatra chronology
Concepts (1992)	The Columbia Years 1943–1952: The Complete Recordings (1993)	Duets (1993)

Professional ratings
Review scores
Source	Rating
AllMusic	5/5 stars

The Columbia Years 1943–1952: The Complete Recordings is a 1993 box set album by American singer Frank Sinatra.

This twelve-disc set contains 285 songs Sinatra recorded during his nine-year career with Columbia Records.

== Track listing ==
=== Disc one ===
1. "Close to You" (Al Hoffman, Carl G. Lampl, James Livingston) - 3:17
2. "You'll Never Know" (Mack Gordon, Harry Warren) - 3:00
  Recorded on June 7, 1943
3. "Sunday, Monday or Always" (Johnny Burke, Jimmy Van Heusen) - 3:15
4. "If You Please" (Burke, Van Heusen) - 2:51
  Recorded on June 22, 1943
5. "People Will Say We're in Love" (Richard Rodgers, Oscar Hammerstein II) - 3:19
6. "Oh What a Beautiful Mornin'" (Rodgers, Hammerstein) - 2:55
  Recorded on August 5, 1943
7. "I Couldn't Sleep a Wink Last Night" (Harold Adamson, Jimmy McHugh) - 2:52
  Recorded on November 3, 1943
8. "A Lovely Way to Spend an Evening" (Adamson, McHugh) - 3:13
9. "The Music Stopped" (Adamson, McHugh) - 2:59
  Recorded on November 10, 1943
10. "If You Are But a Dream (Nat Bonx, Jack Fulton, Moe Jaffe) - 3:03
11. "Saturday Night (Is the Loneliest Night of the Week)" (Sammy Cahn, Jule Styne) - 2:43
12. "There's No You" - (Tom Adair, Hal Hopper) - 3:26
13. "White Christmas" (Irving Berlin) - 3:22
  Recorded on November 14, 1944
14. "I Dream of You (More Than You Dream of Me)" - (Marjorie Goetschius, Edna Osser) - 3:07
15. "I Begged Her" (Cahn, Styne) - 2:59
16. "What Makes the Sunset?" (Cahn, Styne) - 2:54
17. "I Fall in Love Too Easily" (Cahn, Styne) - 3:13
  Recorded on December 1, 1944
18. "Nancy (With the Laughing Face)" (Phil Silvers, Van Heusen) - 3:19
19. "The Cradle Song" (Johannes Brahms) - 3:06
20. "Ol' Man River" (Jerome Kern, Hammerstein II) - 4:00
21. "Stormy Weather" (Harold Arlen, Ted Koehler) - 4:13
22. "The Charm of You" (Cahn, Styne) - 2:59
  Recorded on December 3, 1944

=== Disc two ===
1. "Embraceable You" (George Gershwin, Ira Gershwin) - 3:16
2. "When Your Lover Has Gone" (Einar A. Swan) - 2:52
3. "Kiss Me Again" (Henry Blossom, Victor Herbert) - 2:45
4. "(I Got a Woman Crazy for Me) She's Funny That Way" (Neil Moret, Richard A. Whiting) - 3:20
  Recorded on December 19, 1944
5. "My Melancholy Baby" (Ernie Burnett, George Norton) - 3:08
6. "Where or When" (Rodgers, Lorenz Hart) - 3:13
7. "All the Things You Are" (Hammerstein II, Kern) - 3:00
8. "Mighty Lak' a Rose" (Ethelbert Nevin, Frank Stanton) - 3:23
  Recorded on January 29, 1945
9. "I Should Care" (Cahn, Axel Stordahl, Paul Weston) - 3:00
10. "Homesick, That's All" (Gordon Jenkins) - 3:22
11. "Dream (When You're Feeling Blue)" (Mercer) - 3:02
12. "A Friend of Yours" (Burke, Van Heusen) - 3:01
  Recorded on March 6, 1945
13. "Put Your Dreams Away (For Another Day)" (Ruth Lowe, Paul Mann, George David Weiss) - 3:00
14. "Over the Rainbow" (Arlen, E.Y. Harburg) - 3:16
15. "You'll Never Walk Alone" (Rodgers, Hammerstein II) - 3:25
16. "If I Loved You" (Rodgers, Hammerstein II) - 3:03
  Recorded on May 1, 1945
17. "Lily Belle" (Irving Taylor, D. Franklin) - 3:29
18. "Don't Forget Tonight Tomorrow" (L. Sherin, J. Milton) - 3:02
19. "I've Got a Home in That Rock" (Traditional) - 3:10
20. "Jesus Is a Rock in That Weary Land" (Traditional) - 3:19
  Recorded on May 16, 1945
21. "Stars in Your Eyes" (R. Lopez Mendez, Gabriel Ruiz, M. Greene) - 2:45
22. "My Shawl" (S. Adams, Xavier Cugat) - 3:15
  Recorded on May 24, 1945

=== Disc three ===
1. "Someone to Watch Over Me" (G. Gershwin, I. Gershwin) - 3:19
2. "You Go to My Head" (John Fred Coots, Haven Gillespie) - 3:00
3. "These Foolish Things (Remind Me of You)" (Jack Strachey, Harry Link, Holt Marvell) - 3:08
4. "I Don't Know Why (I Just Do)" (Fred E. Ahlert, Roy Turk) - 2:47
  Recorded on July 30, 1945
5. "The House I Live In (That's America to Me)" (Lewis Allan, Earl Robinson) - 3:20
6. "Day By Day" (Cahn, Axel Stordahl, Paul Weston) - 3:08
7. "Nancy (With the Laughing Face)" - 3:20
8. "You Are Too Beautiful" (Rodgers, Hart) - 3:01
  Recorded on August 22, 1945
9. "America the Beautiful" (Katherine Lee Bates, Samuel Ward) - 2:32
10. "Silent Night, Holy Night" (Joseph Mohr, Franz Gruber) - 3:14
11. "The Moon Was Yellow (And the Night Was Young)" (Ahlert, Edgar Leslie) - 2:58
12. "I Only Have Eyes for You" (Warren, Al Dubin) - 3:13
  Recorded on August 27, 1945
13. "The Old School Teacher" (Willard Robison) - 3:12
14. "Just An Old Stone House" (Alec Wilder) - 3:17
  Recorded on November 15, 1945
15. "Full Moon and Empty Arms" (Sergei Rachmaninoff, Ted Mossman, Buddy Kaye) - 3:13
16. "Oh! What It Seemed to Be" (George David Weiss, Bernie Benjamin, Frank Carle) - 2:59
17. "I Have But One Heart" (Marty Symes, J. Farrow) - 3:13
  Recorded on November 30, 1945
18. "I Don't Stand a Ghost of a Chance with You" (Bing Crosby, Ned Washington, Victor Young)
19. "Why Shouldn't I?" (Cole Porter)
20. "Try a Little Tenderness" (Jimmy Campbell, Reg Connelly, Harry Woods)
21. "Paradise" (Gordon Clifford, Nacio Herb Brown)
  Recorded on December 7, 1945
22. "All Through the Day" (Hammerstein II, Kern)
23. "One Love" (Leo Robin, D. Rose)
24. "Two Hearts Are Better Than One" (Johnny Mercer, Kern)
25. "How Cute Can You Be?" (Carl Fischer, Bill Carey)
  Recorded on February 3, 1946

=== Disc four ===
1. "From This Day Forward" (Leigh Harline, M. Greene)
2. "Where Is My Bess?" (G. Gershwin, I. Gershwin, DuBose Heyward)
3. "Begin the Beguine" (Porter)
4. "Something Old, Something New" (R. Idriss, G. Tibbles)
  Recorded on February 24, 1946
5. "They Say It's Wonderful" (Irving Berlin)
6. "That Old Black Magic" (Harold Arlen, Mercer)
7. "The Girl That I Marry" (Berlin)
8. "I Fall In Love with You Ev'ry Day" (Sam Stept)
9. "How Deep Is the Ocean (How Blue Is the Sky)" (Berlin)
10. "Home on the Range" (Traditional)
11. "The Song Is You" (Hammerstein II, Kern)
  Recorded on March 10, 1946
12. "Soliloquy (Parts 1 & 2)" (Rodgers, Hammerstein II)
13. "Somewhere In the Night" (Joseph Myrow, Gordon)
14. "Could'ja?" (Fischer, Carey)
15. "Five Minutes More" (Cahn, Styne)
  Recorded on May 28, 1946
16. "The Things We Did Last Summer" (Cahn, Styne)
17. "You'll Know When It Happens" (Carmen Lombardo, John Jacob Loeb)
18. "This Is the Night" (R. Evans, L. Bellin)
19. "The Coffee Song (They've Got an Awful Lot of Coffee in Brazil)" (Bob Hilliard, Dick Miles)
  Recorded on July 24, 1946
20. "Among My Souvenirs" (Leslie, H. Nicholls)
21. "I Love You" (Bob Wright, Chet Forrest, Edvard Grieg)
22. "September Song" (Kurt Weill, Maxwell Anderson)
23. "Blue Skies" (Berlin)
24. "Guess I'll Hang My Tears Out to Dry" (Cahn, Styne)
  Recorded on July 30, 1946

=== Disc five ===
1. "Adeste Fideles (O, Come All Ye Faithful)" (Traditional)
2. "Lost in the Stars" (Weill, Anderson)
3. "Jingle Bells" (J. S. Pierpont)
4. "Falling in Love with Love" (Rodgers, Hart)
  Recorded on August 8, 1946
5. "Hush-A-Bye Island" (Harold Adamson, Jimmy McHugh)
6. "So They Tell Me" (H. Mott, J. Gale, Arthur Kent)
7. "There's No Business Like Show Business" (Berlin)
8. "(Once Upon) A Moonlight Night" (Sidney Clare, Irving Bibo)
  Recorded on August 22, 1946
9. "Strange Music" (Wright, Forrest, Grieg)
10. "Poinciana (Song of the Tree)" (Buddy Bernier, Nat Simon)
11. "The Music Stopped" (Adamson, McHugh)
12. "Why Shouldn't It Happen to Us?" (Alberta Nichols, Mann Holiner)
  Recorded on October 15, 1946
13. "Time After Time" (Cahn, Styne)
14. "It's the Same Old Dream" (Cahn, Styne)
15. "I'm Sorry I Made You Cry" (N. J. Clesi)
  Recorded on October 24, 1946
16. "None But the Lonely Heart" (Peter Ilich Tchaikovsky, B. Westbrook)
17. "The Brooklyn Bridge" (Cahn, Styne)
18. "I Believe" (Cahn, Styne)
19. "I Got a Gal I Love (In North & South Dakota)" (Cahn, Styne)
  Recorded on October 31, 1946
20. "The Dum-Dot Song (I Put a Penny In the Gum Slot)" (J. Kay)
21. "All of Me" (Seymour Simons, Gerald Marks)
22. "It's All Up to You" (Cahn, Styne)
23. "My Romance" (Rodgers, Hart)
  Recorded on November 7, 1946

=== Disc six ===
1. "Always" (Berlin)
2. "I Want to Thank Your Folks" (Weiss, Benjamin)
3. "That's How Much I Love You" (Eddy Arnold, Wally Fowler, J. G. Hall)
4. "You Can Take My Word for It Baby" (Russ Freeman, Irving Taylor)
  Recorded on December 15, 1946
5. "Sweet Lorraine" (Mitchell Parish, Cliff Burwell)
  Recorded on December 17, 1946
6. "Always"
7. "I Concentrate on You" (Porter)
8. "My Love for You" (Harry Jacobson, Edward Heyman)
  Recorded on January 9, 1947
9. "Mam'selle" (Gordon, Edmund Goulding)
10. "Ain'tcha Ever Comin' Back" (Stordahl, Weston, Taylor)
11. "Stella By Starlight" (Washington, Young)
  Recorded on March 11, 1947
12. "There But For You Go I" (Alan Lerner, Frederick Loewe)
13. "Almost Like Being In Love" (Lerner, Loewe)
  Recorded on March 31, 1947
14. "Tea for Two" (Vincent Youmans, Irving Caesar)
15. "My Romance" (Rodgers, Hart)
  Recorded on April 25, 1947
16. "Have Yourself a Merry Little Christmas" (Ralph Blane, Hugh Martin)
17. "Christmas Dreaming (A Little Early This Year)" (Irving Gordon, L. Lee)
18. "The Stars Will Remember (So Will I)" (Don Pelosi, Leo Towers)
19. "It All Came True" (Sunny Skylar)
  Recorded on July 3, 1947
20. "That Old Feeling" (Lew Brown, Sammy Fain)
21. "If I Had You" (Campbell, Connelly, Ted Shapiro)
22. "The Nearness of You" (Hoagy Carmichael, Washington)
23. "One for My Baby (And One More for the Road)" (Arlen, Mercer)
  Recorded on August 11, 1947

=== Disc seven ===
1. "But Beautiful" (Van Heusen, Burke)
2. "A Fellow Needs a Girl" (Rodgers, Hammerstein II)
3. "So Far" (Rodgers, Hammerstein II)
  Recorded on August 17, 1947
4. "It All Came True"
  Recorded on September 23, 1947
5. "Can't You Just See Yourself?" (Cahn, Styne)
6. "You're My Girl" (Cahn, Styne)
7. "All of Me"
  Recorded on October 19, 1947
8. "I'll Make Up for Ev'rything" (R. Parker)
9. "Strange Music"
10. "Laura" (Mercer, David Raksin)
11. "Night and Day" (Porter)
  Recorded on October 22, 1947
12. "My Cousin Louella" (B. Bierman, J. Manus)
13. "We Just Couldn't Say Goodbye" (Woods)
14. "S'posin'" (Andy Razaf, Paul Denniker)
  Recorded on October 24, 1947
15. "Just for Now" (D. Redmond)
16. "None But the Lonely Heart"
17. "The Night We Called It a Day" (Matt Dennis, Tom Adair)
18. "The Song Is You"
  Recorded on October 26, 1947
19. "What'll I Do?" (Berlin)
20. "Poinciana (Song of the Tree)"
21. "(I Offer You the Moon) Senorita" (Heyman, Brown)
22. "The Music Stopped" (Adamson, McHugh)
  Recorded on October 29, 1947

=== Disc eight ===
1. "Mean to Me" (Ahlert, Turk)
2. "Spring Is Here" (Rodgers, Hart)
3. "Fools Rush In (Where Angels Fear to Tread)" (Mercer, Rube Bloom)
  Recorded on October 31, 1947
4. "When You Wake" (Henry Nemo)
5. "It Never Entered My Mind" (Rodgers, Hart)
6. "I've Got a Crush on You" (G. Gershwin, I. Gershwin)
  Recorded on November 5, 1947
7. "Body and Soul" (Johnny Green, Heyman, Robert Sour, Frank Eyton)
8. "I'm Glad There Is You" (Jimmy Dorsey, Paul Madeira Mertz)
  Recorded on November 9, 1947
9. "I Went Down to Virginia" (Dave Mann, R. Evans)
10. "If I Only Had a Match" (Arthur Johnston, L. Morris, George W. Meyer)
  Recorded on November 25, 1947
11. "If I Steal a Kiss" (Heyman, Brown)
12. "Autumn in New York" (Vernon Duke)
13. "Everybody Loves Somebody" (Taylor, Ken Lane)
  Recorded on December 4, 1947
14. "A Little Learnin' Is a Dangerous Thing, Part 1" (Sy Oliver, D. Jacobs)
15. "A Little Learnin' Is a Dangerous Thing, Part 2"
16. "Ever Homeward" (Cahn, Styne)
  Recorded on December 8, 1947
17. "But None Like You" (Ray Noble)
18. "Catana" (Ed DeLange, A. Newman)
  Recorded on December 26, 1947
19. "Why Was I Born?" (Hammerstein II, Kern)
20. "It Came Upon a Midnight Clear" (Richard S. Willis, Edmund H. Sears)
21. "O Little Town of Bethlehem" (Lewis H. Redner, Phillips Brooks)
22. "White Christmas" (Berlin)
23. "For Every Man There's a Woman" (Arlen, Robin)
  Recorded on December 28, 1947

=== Disc nine ===
1. "Help Yourself to My Heart" (B. Kaye, S. Timberg)
2. "Santa Claus Is Coming to Town" (John Fred Coots, Haven Gillespie)
  Recorded on December 28, 1947
3. "If I Forget You" (Caesar)
4. "Where Is the One?" (Wilder, E. Finckel)
5. "When Is Sometime?" (Van Heusen, Burke)
  Recorded on December 30, 1947
6. "It Only Happens When I Dance with You" (Berlin)
7. "A Fella with an Umbrella" (Berlin)
  Recorded on March 16, 1948
8. "Nature Boy" (Eden Ahbez)
  Recorded on April 10, 1948
9. "Sunflower" (David)
  Recorded on December 6, 1948
10. "Once In Love With Amy" (Frank Loesser)
  Recorded on December 14, 1948
11. "Once in Love With Amy"
12. "Why Can't You Behave?" (Porter)
13. "Bop! Goes My Heart" (Styne, W. Bishop)
  Recorded on December 15, 1948
14. "Comme Ci Comme Ca" (Joan Whitney, Alex Kramer, P. Dudan, B. Coquatrix)
15. "No Orchids for My Lady" (Jack Strachey, A. Stranks)
16. "While the Angelus Was Ringing (Les Trois Cloches)" (Dick Manning, J. Villard)
  Recorded on December 19, 1948
17. "If You Stub Your Toe On the Moon" (Van Heusen, Burke)
18. "Kisses and Tears" (Cahn, Styne)
  Recorded on January 4, 1949
19. "Some Enchanted Evening" (Rodgers, Hammerstein II)
20. "Bali Ha'i" (Rodgers, Hammerstein II)
  Recorded on February 28, 1949
21. "The Right Girl for Me" (Betty Comden, Adolph Green, Roger Edens)
22. "Night After Night" (Cahn, Stordahl, Weston)
  Recorded on March 3, 1949
23. "The Hucklebuck" (Alfred, Gibson)
24. "It Happens Every Spring" (Myrow, Gordon)
  Recorded on April 10, 1949

=== Disc ten ===
1. "Let's Take an Old-Fashioned Walk" (duet with Doris Day) (Berlin)
2. "(Just One Way to Say) I Love You" (Berlin)
  Recorded on May 6, 1949
3. "It All Depends On You" (Brown, Buddy DeSylva, Ray Henderson)
4. "Bye Bye Baby" (Robin, Styne)
5. "Don't Cry Joe (Let Her Go, Let Her Go, Let Her Go)" (Al Piantados, Joe Marsala)
  Recorded on July 10, 1949
6. "Every Man Should Marry" (Silver, Benny Davis)
7. "If I Ever Love Again" (R. Carlyle, D. Reynolds)
  Recorded on July 14, 1949
8. "We're Just a Kiss Apart" (Leo Robin, Jule Styne)
9. "Every Man Should Marry"
10. "The Wedding of Lili Marlene" (T. Connor, J. Reine)
  Recorded on July 21, 1949
11. "That Lucky Old Sun" (Gillespie, B. Smith)
12. "Mad About You" (Washington, Young)
13. "(On the Island of) Stromboli" (Taylor, Lane)
  Recorded on September 15, 1949
14. "The Old Master Painter" (Gillespie, Smith)
15. "Why Remind Me?" (D. Tauber, S. Willner)
  Recorded on October 30, 1949
16. "Sorry" (Richard Whiting, Anna Sosenko, Buddy Pepper)
17. "Sunshine Cake" (Van Heusen, Burke)
18. "(We've Got A) Sure Thing" (Van Heusen, Burke)
  Recorded on November 8, 1949
19. "God's Country" (Gillespie, Smith)
20. "Sheila" (Frank Sinatra, B. Hayward, R. Staver)
21. "Chattanoogie Shoe Shine Boy" (Harry Stone, Jack Stapp)
  Recorded on January 12, 1950
22. "Kisses and Tears"
23. "When the Sun Goes Down" (LeRoy Carr)
  Recorded on February 23, 1950
24. "American Beauty Rose" (R. Evans, Arthur Altman, David)
  Recorded on March 10, 1950

=== Disc eleven ===
1. "Peachtree Street" (Sinatra, L. Mason, J. Saunders)
  Recorded on April 8, 1950
2. "Should I (Reveal)" (Brown, Freed)
3. "You Do Something to Me" (Porter)
4. "Lover" (Rodgers, Hart)
  Recorded on April 14, 1950
5. "When You're Smiling (The Whole World Smiles With You)" (Joe Goodwin, Larry Shay, Marvin Fisher)
6. "It's Only a Paper Moon" (Arlen, Erwin 'Yip' Harburg, Billy Rose)
7. "My Blue Heaven" (Walter Donaldson, George Whiting)
8. "The Continental" (Herb Magidson, Con Conrad)
  Recorded on April 24, 1950
9. "Goodnight, Irene" (H. Ledbetter, J. Lomax)
10. "Dear Little Boy of Mine" (J. K. Brennan, Ernest R. Ball)
  Recorded on June 28, 1950
11. "Life Is So Peculiar" (Van Heusen, Burke)
  Recorded on August 2, 1950
12. "Accidents Will Happen" (Van Heusen, Burke)
13. "One Finger Melody" (Hoffman, Kermit Goell, Fred Spielman)
  Recorded on September 18, 1950
14. "Remember Me in Your Dreams" (David, Marty Nevins)
15. "If Only She'd Look My Way" (Ivor Novello, A. Melville)
16. "London By Night" (Carroll Coates)
17. "Meet Me at the Copa" (Cahn, Stordahl)
  Recorded on September 21, 1950
18. "Come Back to Sorrento (Torna A Surriento)" (Claude Aveling, Ernesto DeCurtis)
19. "April in Paris" (Duke, Harburg)
20. "I Guess I'll Have to Dream the Rest" (Mickey Stoner, Bud Green, Martin Block)
21. "Nevertheless (I'm In Love With You)" (Bert Kalmar, Harry Ruby)
  Recorded on November 5, 1950
22. "Let It Snow! Let It Snow! Let It Snow!" (Cahn, Styne)
  Recorded on October 9, 1950
23. "Take My Love" (Jack Wolf, Joel Herron, Sinatra)
24. "I Am Loved" (Porter)
25. "You Don't Remind Me" (Porter)
  Recorded on November 11, 1950
26. "Love Means Love" (Carl Sigman, Bonnie Lake)
27. "Cherry Pies 'Ought to Be You" (Porter)
  Recorded on December 11, 1950

=== Disc twelve ===
1. "Faithful" (Jimmy Kennedy, A. Alstone)
2. "You're the One" (Washington, Young)
3. "There's Something Missing" (Weiss, Benjamin, J. Rule, R. O'Brien, M. Downe)
  Recorded on January 16, 1951
4. "Hello, Young Lovers" (Rodgers, Hammerstein II)
5. "We Kiss in a Shadow" (Rodgers, Hammerstein II)
  Recorded on March 2, 1951
6. "I Whistle a Happy Tune" (Rodgers, Hammerstein II)
7. "I'm a Fool to Want You" (Wolf, Herron, Sinatra)
8. "Love Me" (Washington, Young)
  Recorded on March 27, 1951
9. "Mama Will Bark" (Manning)
10. "It's a Long Way (From Your House to My House)" (Sid Tepper, Roy Brodsky)
  Recorded on May 10, 1951
11. "Castle Rock" (Ervin Drake, J. Shirl, Al Sears)
12. "Farewell, Farewell to Love" (Wolf, George Siravo)
13. "Deep Night" (Rudy Vallée, Charlie Henderson)
  Recorded on July 19, 1951
14. "A Good Man Is Hard to Find" (Eddie Green)
  Recorded on October 16, 1951
15. "I Could Write a Book" (Rodgers, Hart)
16. "I Hear a Rhapsody" (George Fragos, Jack Baker, Dick Gasparre)
17. "Walking In the Sunshine" (B. Merrill)
  Recorded on January 7, 1952
18. "My Girl" (C. Freed)
19. "Feet of Clay" (Joan Whitney, Alex Kramer, Hy Zaret)
20. "Don't Ever Be Afraid to Go Home" (Sigman, Bob Hilliard)
  Recorded on February 6, 1952
21. "Luna Rossa (Blushing Moon)" (Goell, V. De Crescenzo, A. Vian)
22. "The Birth of the Blues" (Brown, DeSylva, Henderson)
23. "Azure-Te (Paris Blues)" (Wolf, Davis)
24. "Tennessee Newsboy (The Newsboy Blues)" (Percy Faith, Manning)
25. "Bim Bam Baby" (Sammy Mysels)
  Recorded on June 3, 1952
26. "Why Try to Change Me Now?" (Cy Coleman, Joseph McCarthy)
  Recorded on September 17, 1952

== Personnel ==
- Frank Sinatra - Vocals

== Production ==
- Executive Producer: Jerry Shulman
- Producer: Didier C. Deutsch
- Associate Producer: Mark Wilder
- Project Director: Gary Pacheco
- Associated Executive Producer: Ria Curley
- Liner notes: Will Friedwald
