= Take My Love =

"Take My Love" may refer to:

- Take My Love, a 1980 album from Nancy Wilson discography
- "Take My Love", a song by Frank Sinatra
- Take My Love, an album by Russian musical group Plazma
- "Take My Love", a song by Russian musical group Plazma from the eponymous album
- "Take My Love", a song by Swedish band Krokus from their album Hellraiser.
