= I'm a Fool to Want You =

1951 song by Frank Sinatra

1951 release as a Columbia Records 78, 39425.

1958 release as a Columbia 45 single reissue, 4-41133.

"I'm a Fool to Want You" is a 1951 song composed by Frank Sinatra, Jack Wolf, and Joel Herron. Frank Sinatra co-wrote the lyrics and released the song as a Columbia Records single. The ballad is considered a pop and jazz standard.

== Original recording ==
1951 sheet music cover, Barton Music, New York.

Frank Sinatra first recorded the song with the Ray Charles Singers on March 27, 1951, in an arrangement by Axel Stordahl in New York. It was the second song recorded at the sessions that began with "I Whistle a Happy Tune" and ended with "Love Me".

=== Background ===
It is commonly thought by many listeners that Sinatra was navigating his stormy marriage to Ava Gardner at the time, but Sinatra and Gardner didn't marry until November 7, 1951, nearly 8 months after the song was recorded. It is more likely that he was melancholy about his wife Nancy's refusal to grant him a divorce so he could marry Gardner and his guilt for the impact his very public affair with Gardner was having on his family, especially his three children. To complicate matters, his career was in a freefall and he and Nancy were both Catholics and the Church forbade divorce. His emotional rendering of the song is haunting and it instantly became one of the classic "saloon songs" in his repertoire along with "One for My Baby", "Angel Eyes", "Don't Worry 'bout Me", "In the Wee Small Hours of the Morning" and "Guess I'll Hang My Tears Out to Dry" among many others.

It would not have escaped Sinatra that his unbridled and uncontrollable passion for Gardner and the consequential collateral damage it caused his family, reputation, and career made him a fool, not only in his own eyes, but to the world. So, he felt the song was perfect for his current situation and, for him personally, somewhat cathartic. As Gay Talese wrote in his 1966 article for Esquire, "Frank Sinatra Has a Cold," "A friend who was in the studio when Sinatra recorded it recalled: 'Frank was really worked up that night. He did the song in one take, then turned around and walked out of the studio and that was that ...'" Writer Mark Steyn quotes longtime Sinatra arranger Nelson Riddle as saying, "It was Ava who taught him how to sing a torch song. That's how he learned. She was the greatest love of his life and he lost her."

=== Columbia Records releases ===
The song was released as a Columbia Records 10" 78 B side single in 1951 backed with "Mama Will Bark" (with Dagmar) as #39425, Matrix # CO-45185-1. The single reached #14 on the Billboard pop singles chart in a seven-week chart run beginning in June and #27 on Cashbox the same month in a 5-week chart run. "Mama Will Bark" reached #21. The song was re-released in 1954 as an A side Columbia single with "If I Forget You" as the B side. Columbia also released the song as part of an EP, 2559, which also featured "I Should Care", "I Could Write a Book", and "If You Are But a Dream".

== 1957 Capitol Records recording ==
Sinatra recorded a second version at the Capitol Records Tower in Hollywood on May 1, 1957, arranged and conducted by Gordon Jenkins, which was released in 1957 on the album Where Are You?. This album was Sinatra’s first stereo recording. Capitol also released the song as part of an EP, EAP-2-855, EBFI-855.

== Later album appearances ==
The Columbia recording appeared on the 1966 album Frank Sinatra's Greatest Hits: The Early Years, Volume Two. The song also appeared on the 1986 4-disc collection The Voice: Frank Sinatra, the Columbia Years (1943–1952) and the 1993 box-set album The Columbia Years 1943-1952: The Complete Recordings. The song also appeared on Frank Sinatra: The Best of the Columbia Years: 1943-1952 in 1995 and Frank Sinatra Sings His Greatest Hits in 1997 both on Columbia. In 2003, the song was included on the Sony collection The Essential Sinatra: The Columbia Years.

The song was featured on the 1992 Sinatra: Soundtrack to the CBS Mini-Series released on Reprise Records.

== Cover versions ==
The song has been recorded by more than 100 performers. Billie Holiday recorded a version of the song as the opening track for her 1958 album Lady in Satin.

An R&B interpretation of the song was recorded by Ketty Lester in late 1961. Though originally intended as the headline track, it was the single's flip-side, "Love Letters", that drove the double-sided record to peak at No. 5 on the Billboard Hot 100, and No. 2 on the R&B chart in early 1962.

In 2014, singer Angelina Jordan made her television acting debut in the season three finale of the series Lilyhammer, performing a jazz cover of the song.

Other recordings include a version by Bob Dylan, who used the track as the opening number for his 2015 album of standards, Shadows in the Night. Singer-songwriter Mitski recorded a cover that was in 2017 included on the 7-Inches for Planned Parenthood compilation box set.
