= The Voice: Frank Sinatra, the Columbia Years (1943–1952) =

Compilation album by Frank Sinatra
- Released: 1986
- Recorded: 1943–1952
- Genre: Traditional pop
- Label: Columbia

The Voice: Frank Sinatra, the Columbia Years is a four-disc compilation album by the American singer Frank Sinatra, released in 1986.

== Track listing ==
Disc 1:

1. The Nearness of You
2. If I Had You
3. Nevertheless
4. You Go to My Head
5. My Melancholy Baby
6. How Deep Is the Ocean?
7. Embraceable You
8. She's Funny That Way (I Got a Woman Crazy for Me)
9. For Every Man There's a Woman
10. I Don't Know Why (I Just Do)
11. Someone to Watch Over Me
12. Love Me
13. There's No Business Like Show-Business
14. The Song Is You
15. September Song
16. Oh, What a Beautiful Morning
17. They Say It's Wonderful
18. Bess, Oh Where Is My Bess?

Disc 2:

1. Saturday Night (Is the Loneliest Night in the Week)
2. Poinciana
3. Try a Little Tenderness
4. Autumn in New York
5. April in Paris
6. Dream
7. Nancy (With the Laughing Face)
8. Put Your Dreams Away
9. I'm Glad There Is You
10. Day by Day
11. Close to You
12. I'm a Fool to Want You
13. Where or When
14. I Could Write a Book
15. Why Was I Born?
16. Lost in the Stars
17. All the Things You Are
18. Ol' Man River

Disc 3:

1. Should I?
2. Birth of the Blues
3. Mean to Me
4. It All Depends on You
5. Deep Night
6. Sweet Lorraine
7. Castle Rock
8. Why Can't You Behave?
9. My Blue Heaven
10. S'posin'
11. You Can Take My Word for It, Baby
12. Blue Skies
13. The Continental
14. It's the Same Old Dream
15. Laura
16. Stormy Weather
17. I've Got a Crush on You
18. The House I Live In

Disc 4:

1. One for My Baby
2. I Should Care
3. These Foolish Things
4. I Guess I'll Have to Dream the Rest
5. It Never Entered My Mind
6. When Your Lover Has Gone
7. Body and Soul
8. That Old Feeling
9. I Don't Stand a Ghost of a Chance with You
10. There's No You
11. Guess I'll Hang My Tears Out to Dry
12. Why Try to Change Me Now?
13. All Through the Day
14. I Couldn't Sleep a Wink Last Night
15. Time After Time
16. But Beautiful
17. I Fall in Love Too Easily
18. The Brooklyn Bridge
