= Double Dynamite =

1951 film by Irving Cummings

- Original US cinema poster
- Directed by: Irving Cummings
- Written by: Melville Shavelson (screenplay); Harry Crane (additional dialogue)
- Based on: Story by Leo Rosten
- Produced by: Irving Cummings Jr. Irwin Allen (uncredited)
- Starring: Jane Russell; Groucho Marx; Frank Sinatra
- Cinematography: Robert De Grasse
- Edited by: Harry Marker
- Music by: Leigh Harline
- Production company: RKO Pictures
- Distributed by: RKO Pictures
- Release dates: December 25, 1951 (New York); February 3, 1952 (Los Angeles)
- Running time: 80 minutes
- Country: United States
- Language: English

Double Dynamite is a 1951 American musical comedy film directed by Irving Cummings and starring Jane Russell, Groucho Marx and Frank Sinatra. The screenplay was written by Melville Shavelson based on a story by Leo Rosten.

The film involves a bank teller suspected of embezzling who turns to a sardonic waiter for advice.

== Plot ==
Meek California Fidelity Trust teller Johnny Dalton asks his boss, J. L. McKissack, for a raise so that he can marry fellow teller Mildred "Mibs" Goodhue. Although Johnny's request is declined, Mibs wants to marry him anyway. Emile J. Keck, a friend and waiter at an Italian restaurant that they frequent, also urges Johnny to take a chance, even facetiously suggesting that he rob the bank where he works. When Johnny insists on waiting until they can afford to marry, Mibs is enraged.

Johnny spots two men attacking a third in an alley and intervenes. The victim, "Hot Horse" Harris, is a bookie. In gratitude, Harris gives Johnny $1,000, but Johnny refuses to accept it as anything but a loan. Harris bets the entire amount on a sure thing in a fixed race, placing the bet at the bookie joint run by his competitor. From the winnings, Johnny retains $5,000. Harris places two more bets for Johnny, both winners, bringing Johnny's total to $60,000. Harris has only $40,000 on hand, so he tells Johnny to collect the rest the next day. Johnny shares the good news with Emile, but Emile believes that Johnny followed his advice about the bank robbery.

The bank's auditors have discovered $75,000 missing. Fearing that he will be suspected of the crime, Johnny enlists Emile's help in hiding the money. Mibs does not believe Johnny's story. She is alone in his apartment when $20,000, the remainder of what Harris owes Johnny, is tossed through the door. Still believing that Johnny stole the money, she seeks Bob Pulsifer Jr., the lazy, lecherous son of the bank's founder, and offers it to him only if Bob will not inform the police about Johnny. However, he phones the police.

Emile poses as a millionaire and redeposits the remaining funds in Johnny's bank, hoping that it will be the last place where the police will look. This attracts the attention of R.B. Pulisfer, the reclusive head of the board of directors, who insists on meeting Emile, hoping for a donation to his charity. Emile registers at an exclusive hotel and maintains the millionaire ruse with Johnny's money. R.B. finds Emile refreshing, and their friendship helps to clear Johnny.

Mibs insists on driving Johnny to Mexico, but they are caught. They are surprised that the police know that Johnny had won the money. The police instead arrest Mibs, as the auditors have tracked the missing $75,000 to her. However, Johnny accidentally discovers by that Mibs' adding machine is malfunctioning. Mibs tells a man whom she thinks is a reporter about all of the expensive gifts that Johnny has given her, only to learn that the man actually works for the IRS.

Johnny's boss McKissack has been fired for falsely accusing Johnny and Mildred and takes Emile's waiter job.

== Cast ==
- Jane Russell as Mildred "Mibs" Goodhue
- Groucho Marx as Emile J. Keck
- Frank Sinatra as Johnny Dalton
- Don McGuire as Bob Pulsifer Jr.
- Howard Freeman as R. B. Pulsifer Sr.
- Nestor Paiva as "Hot Horse" Harris
- Frank Orth as Mr. Kofer
- Harry Hayden as J. L. McKissack
- William Edmunds as Mr. Baganucci, Emile's boss
- Russell Thorson as IRS agent
- Lou Nova as Santa Claus Lookout (uncredited)
- Ida Moore as Elderly Lady In Sewing Room (uncredited)
- George Chandler as Fur Coat Deliverer (uncredited)

== Production ==
The film was developed as The Pasadena Story. It is based on a story written by Leo Rosten that Michael Curtiz had purchased. Curtiz hired Mel Shavelson to write the script. In February 1948, Curtiz sold the story and script to Signet Productions, Irving Cummings' production company, and they tried to arrange release through Columbia. Signet eventually secured financing with RKO Pictures. It was Cummings' first directorial effort since 1944, as he had been ill, but it was also the last film that Cummings directed.

Jane Russell was under contract to Howard Hughes, who had just bought RKO Pictures. Frank Sinatra owed a film to the studio. Russell and Marx each sing a duet with Sinatra written by Jule Styne and Sammy Cahn. Marx and Sinatra sing "It's Only Money" and Russell and Sinatra deliver the romantic "Kisses and Tears".

Filming began on November 22, 1948, under the working title of It's Only Money, but Hughes changed the title to Double Dynamite as a reference to Russell's famous breasts. After filming ended on December 22, RKO closed the studio as it readjusted following Hughes' purchase of the company. Although filmed in 1948, Double Dynamite was held for several years after production and released in 1951.

== Reception ==
In a contemporary review for The New York Times, critic Howard Thompson wrote: "Whatever that sizzling title is supposed to mean, this thin little comedy is strictly a wet firecracker. The three stars are marking time, along with the audience, in a slow, dull and predictable tale ... Those behind the camera ... apparently were as long on determination as they were short of inspiration."

Critic Philip K. Scheuer of the Los Angeles Times wrote: "'Double Dynamite'—the significance of which, as a title, is indicated by, and limited to, newspaper ads and the billboards around town—is an RKO picture costarring such diverse catch-names as Jane Russell, Groucho Marx and Frank Sinatra, in that order. It does none of them justice in the sphere in which each is supposed to excel, though it naturally contains moments in which they appear to be on the verge of getting started."

== Home video ==
Double Dynamite was released on DVD on May 13, 2008, both individually and as part of a box set of Frank Sinatra films.
