= Andy Williams Sings Rodgers and Hammerstein =

Andy Williams Sings Rodgers And Hammerstein

Studio album by Andy Williams
- Released: February 1958
- Recorded: November 6, 1957; November 7, 1957; November 12, 1957
- Genre: Show tunes; traditional pop; vocal pop
- Length: 35:53
- Label: Cadence

Andy Williams chronology
Andy Williams (1958)	Andy Williams Sings Rodgers And Hammerstein (1958)	Two Time Winners (1959)

Alternate cover
- 1963 reissue

Andy Williams Sings Rodgers and Hammerstein is the second studio album by American pop singer Andy Williams and was orchestrated and conducted by Alvy West. It was released in February 1958 by Cadence Records and focuses upon songs composed by Richard Rodgers with lyrics by Oscar Hammerstein II.

When the album was reissued by Cadence in 1963, the Review Panel in the somewhat newly renamed Billboard magazine updated the rating it was given upon its initial release to reflect the fact that "Williams, a seller of stature," had become "increasingly hot, thanks to regular TV exposure and hits on his current label." Whereas the 1958 review yielded only a four-star rating, the 1963 reissue garnered the magazine's coveted Spotlight Pick, which was given to albums with the greatest sales potential.

The album was released on compact disc for the first time by Collectables Records on September 12, 2000, as tracks 13 through 24 on a pairing of two albums on CD with tracks 1 through 12 consisting of Williams's 1958 collection of Cadence Records singles that was simply entitled Andy Williams. Collectables included this CD in a box set entitled Classic Album Collection, Vol. 1, which contains 17 of his studio albums and three compilations and was released on June 26, 2001. Andy Williams Sings Rodgers and Hammerstein was included in a box set entitled Eight Classic Albums Box Set, which contains 7 of his studio albums, 1 compilation, and was released on November 9, 2012.

== Reception ==
Professional ratings
Review scores
Source	Rating
Allmusic	4/5 stars
The Billboard (1958)	4/5 stars
The Encyclopedia of Popular Music	3/5 stars

In AllMusic, William Ruhlmann wrote that Williams "wasn't really a rocker, even if he sometimes pretended to be one for commercial purposes at the behest of Cadence Records head Archie Bleyer" and that he "was allowed to show his true colors by recording a collection of Rodgers & Hammerstein songs from the musicals Oklahoma!, Carousel, South Pacific, and The King and I. The result was the birth of the Andy Williams his fans knew from then on." Ruhlmann felt that "Williams revealed his warm tenor with its touches of Mel Tormé's velvety tones on material he clearly felt comfortable with" and that his "buoyancy and sincerity as a singer were never better displayed than they were here."

Billboard gave a positive review, saying "he registers best on a bright, verveful reading of "Getting to Know You"

Variety noted "The Styling is smooth in the easy-going Williams manner and the selections are first rate"

Cashbox gave a positive review, saying it "finds [Williams] tastefully reading the songs of the two noted songwriters, described the album as a "sure-fire blockbuster"

== Track listing ==
All songs written by Richard Rodgers & Oscar Hammerstein II

=== Side one ===
1. "Some Enchanted Evening" – 4:19
2. "If I Loved You" – 2:25
3. "Getting to Know You" – 2:04
4. "This Nearly Was Mine" – 2:55
5. "Bali Ha'i" – 3:00
6. "I Have Dreamed" – 3:06

=== Side two ===
1. "People Will Say We're in Love" – 3:03
2. "Younger Than Springtime" – 3:33
3. "I Whistle a Happy Tune" – 1:50
4. "We Kiss in a Shadow" – 3:33
5. "The Surrey With the Fringe on Top" – 3:28
6. "Hello Young Lovers" – 2:44

== Personnel ==
- Alvy West – conductor, orchestration
- Andy Williams – vocals
