= It's Only Money (1951 song) =

Song performed by Frank Sinatra

"It's Only Money" is a song from the 1951 RKO Radio Pictures musical Double Dynamite, written by Jule Styne and Sammy Cahn and performed by Frank Sinatra and Groucho Marx.

The song's title was initially also the title song of the film, before RKO owner Howard Hughes changed the title to Double Dynamite as a reference to co-star Jane Russell's famous cleavage. The song is performed twice in the film: first in a scene where Sinatra and Marx are walking rapidly down a street, with Sinatra "trying to keep pace with Groucho Marx's trademark loping walk"; and then at the finale of the film, sung this time by Sinatra, Marx, and Russell.

The song was included in the 2002 compilation album Frank Sinatra in Hollywood 1940–1964. Billboard's review of this 6-CD set mentioned the inclusion of this "lesser known" song as one of the compilation's "more charming" moments.
