= Edna Osser =

American musician

Edna Osser (24 April 1919 – 6 April 2005) was an American lyricist. She wrote the lyrics of songs interpreted by Frank Sinatra, Perry Como, Doris Day, between others, such as I Dream Of You (More Than You Dream I Do) and I'll Always Be With You. Edna was married to orchestra leader Abraham “Glenn” Osser and wrote with him opening numbers and incidental music in Miss America Pageant. She died in Harrison, New York.

== Selected Songs ==
- I Dream Of You (More Than You Dream I Do) - (1944, with Marjorie Goetschius)
- I'll Always Be With You - (1945, with Marjorie Goetschius)
- The Last Time I Saw You - (1945, with Marjorie Goetschius)
- Ah Yes, There's Good Blues Tonight - (1946, with Glenn Osser)
- You're Diff'rent - (1949, with Marjorie Goetschius)

== Songbook ==
- There You Go: Sheet Music. 1945. Embassy Music Corp.
