= Sheila (Frank Sinatra song) =

1953 song by Frank Sinatra

1953 Columbia Records release as a 45 promo single.

"Sheila" is a 1953 song recorded and co-written by Frank Sinatra. The song was released as a single on Columbia Records.

== Background ==
The song was written in 1949 by Frank Sinatra, Chris(topher) "Bob" Hayward, and Robert Staver and published by Barton Music. The song was arranged by Axel Stordahl. The song was recorded with The Jeff Alexander Choir. Columbia released the song as a 45 and 78 single backed with the reissued "Day By Day" as 40565, Matrix # ZSP 36980, in 1953. The single did not chart. The single was also released as a white label Columbia Records DJ or promotional 45.

== Album appearances ==
The song appeared on the 1993 Frank Sinatra compilation album The Columbia Years 1943–1952: The Complete Recordings.

== Personnel ==
The song was recorded on January 12, 1950, in Hollywood. Two masters were made of the song. The personnel on the session were: Frank Sinatra (ldr), Axel Stordahl (con), Heine Beau, Leonard Hartman, Jules Kinsler, Babe Russin, Fred Stulce (sax), Ziggy Elman (t), Robert McGarity (tb), Jack Cave, Vincent De Rosa (frh), Allan Reuss (g), Philip Stephens (b), Ken Lane (p), Ann Mason (hrp), Ray Hagan (d), Sam Cytron, David Frisina, George Kast, Nick Pisani, Raoul Polikian, Mischa Russell (vn), Maurice Perlmutter, Gary White (vl), Cy Bernard (vc), Frank Sinatra (v), and The Jeff Alexander Choir (bkv).

== Sources ==
- Granata, Charles L. (1999). Sessions with Sinatra: Frank Sinatra and the Art of Recording. Chicago Review Press. ISBN 1-55652-509-5
- Phasey, Chris (1995). Francis Albert Sinatra: Tracked Down (Discography). Buckland Publications. ISBN 0-7212-0935-1
- Summers, Antony and Swan, Robbyn (2005). Sinatra: The Life. Doubleday. ISBN 0-552-15331-1
