= I Dream of You (More Than You Dream I Do) =

Song performed by Frank Sinatra

"I Dream of You (More Than You Dream I Do)" is a popular song.

It was written by Marjorie Goetschius and Edna Osser and published in 1944.

Charted versions were recorded by Tommy Dorsey and his orchestra, by Andy Russell, by Frank Sinatra, and by Perry Como.

The recording by Tommy Dorsey was made on November 14, 1944 and released by RCA Victor as catalog number 20-1608. It first reached the Billboard magazine charts on December 28, 1944 and lasted 8 weeks on the chart, peaking at #4. The flip side of this recording was also a big hit, "Opus No. 1."

The recording by Andy Russell was released by Capitol Records as catalog number 175. It first reached the Billboard magazine charts on December 21, 1944 and lasted 3 weeks on the chart, peaking at #5. The flip side of this recording was "Magic Is the Moonlight."

The recording by Frank Sinatra was made on December 1, 1944, released by Columbia Records as catalog number 36762). It first reached the Billboard magazine charts on January 18, 1945 and lasted 4 weeks on the chart, peaking at #7. This recording was a two-sided hit; the flip side of this recording was "Saturday Night (Is the Loneliest Night of the Week)."

The recording by Perry Como was made on December 8, 1944 and released by RCA Victor as catalog number 20-1629. It reached the Billboard magazine charts on January 18, 1945 and lasted 1 week on the chart, at #10. The flip side of this recording was "I'm Confessin' (that I Love You)." This recording was also released in the United Kingdom by His Master's Voice with the catalog number BD-1165. The flip side of this recording was "If You Were the Only Girl (in the World)"

== Other recorded versions ==
- Gene Bua (released 1960 by Warwick Records (United Kingdom) as catalog number 602, with the flip side "Willie"
- Georgia Carr (released by Capitol Records as catalog number 2277, with the flip side "I Let a Song Go Out of My Heart")
- Jimmy Dorsey and his orchestra (recorded November 21, 1944, released by Decca Records as catalog number 18637, with the flip side "Magic Is the Moonlight")
- Alma Cogan on her album, With You in Mind (1961)
- Other versions of the song have been recorded by Doris Day and Les Brown's orchestra, by Archie Lewis and The Geraldo Strings, Jerry Lewis, and by Johnny Mathis.
