= Take My Love (Frank Sinatra song) =

1950 song by Frank Sinatra

Single by Frank Sinatra
- B-side: "Come Back to Sorrento"
- Released: 1950
- Recorded: November 1950
- Genre: Pop
- Label: Columbia
- Songwriters: Frank Sinatra; Jack Wolf; Joel Herron

"Take My Love" is a 1950 pop song co-written and recorded by Frank Sinatra. The song was released as a Columbia Records A side single.

== Background ==
"Take My Love" was composed by Frank Sinatra, Jack Wolf, and Joel Herron in 1950. The melody is based on a motif from the 3rd Symphony in F Major by Johannes Brahms. Frank Sinatra released the song as an A side Columbia single in 1951 backed with "Come Back to Sorrento". Frank Sinatra co-wrote the lyrics to "Take My Love". He also co-wrote "I'm a Fool to Want You" with Jack Wolf and Joel Herron in 1951. The song was arranged by Axel Stordahl.

The song was released as a Columbia A side single as Catalog Number 39118, Master Number CO-44634-1, in three formats, as a 10" 78, 39118, as a 7" 33, 3–39118, and as a 7" 45, 4–39118. The single did not chart.

The song was recorded in November 1950. Frank Sinatra also performed the song on his television series.

== Album appearances ==
"Take My Love" appeared on the 1957 Frank Sinatra compilation album Adventures of the Heart on Columbia Records as CL 953.

The song appeared on the 1993 Columbia compilation collection Frank Sinatra: The Columbia Years 1943-1952: The Complete Recordings, the 2001 Columbia/Legacy album 1993 Frank Sinatra: Love Songs, and the 2004 album Frank Sinatra: Romantic Sinatra on the Blue Moon label.

== Personnel ==
The song was recorded on November 11, 1950, in New York. The personnel on the session were: Frank Sinatra (ldr), Axel Stordahl (con), Arthur Drelinger, Harold Feldman, Manny Gershman, Bernard Kaufman, Herman Schertzer (sax), Lee Castle, Dale McMickle, Johnny Owens (t), George Arus, Bill Rank, William Rausch (tb), John Barrows (frh), Matty Golizio (g), Frank Carroll (b), Elaine Vito Ricci (hrp), Johnny Blowers (d), Julius Brand, Julius Held, Maurice Hershaft, Harry Katzman, Milton Lomask, Raoul Polikian (vn), Solomon Deutsch, Isadore Zirr (vl), George Polikian (vc), Frank Sinatra (v).

== Sources ==
- Granata, Charles L. (1999). Sessions with Sinatra: Frank Sinatra and the Art of Recording. Chicago Review Press. ISBN 1-55652-509-5
- Phasey, Chris (1995). Francis Albert Sinatra: Tracked Down (Discography). Buckland Publications. ISBN 0-7212-0935-1
- Summers, Antony and Swan, Robbyn (2005). Sinatra: The Life. Doubleday. ISBN 0-552-15331-1
