= Peachtree Street (song) =

1950 song by Frank Sinatra

Single by Frank Sinatra and Rosemary Clooney
- B-side: "This Is the Night"
- Published: 1950
- Released: May 1950
- Recorded: April 8, 1950
- Genre: Traditional pop
- Length: 3:09
- Label: Columbia
- Composer: Leni Mason
- Lyricists: Frank Sinatra, Jimmy Saunders

1950 sheet music cover, Barton Music, New York.

"Peachtree Street" is a 1950 song co-written and recorded by Frank Sinatra in a duet with Rosemary Clooney. The song was released as a Columbia Records single.

== Background ==
Frank Sinatra co-wrote the song with Leni Mason and Jimmy Saunders. Mason composed the music while Sinatra and Saunders wrote the lyrics. The song was arranged by George Siravo

The song was released as an A side Columbia 10" 78 single, Catalog Number 38853, Matrix Number CO-43100-1 and as a 7" 33, 1-669. The B side was the re-issued "This Is the Night." Neither of the songs charted.

The subject of the song is a stroll down Peachtree Street in Atlanta, Georgia. Sinatra originally intended Dinah Shore to sing the duet with him. When Shore declined, Clooney was asked. The song was recorded on April 8, 1950.

The song features spoken asides by Sinatra and Clooney. Rosemary Clooney asks: "Say, Frank, you wanna take a walk?" Frank Sinatra replies: "Sure, sweetie, just pick a street." He noted how there were no peach trees on the street. She replied that they had to look back at the history of the street: "We'll have to go back a few years." In one of the asides, he noted that Clooney's real birthplace was Maysville, Kentucky. The song makes reference to an eventual marriage in the city of Atlanta. At the end, Sinatra asks whether she wants to carry him or call a cab. She whistles for a taxi.

== Album appearances ==
The song appeared on the 1993 Frank Sinatra Sony compilation album The Columbia Years 1943–1952: The Complete Recordings, Volume 11, the 1999 Concord Records release Rosemary Clooney: Songs from the Girl Singer: A Musical Autobiography, and the 2002 album Rosemary Clooney: Complete 1950-1952 Columbia Master Takes on the Jazz Factory label.

== Personnel ==
The song was recorded on April 8, 1950 in New York. The personnel on the session were: Frank Sinatra (ldr), George Siravo (con), Emmett Callen, Leonard Hartman, Al Klink, Babe Russin, Herman Schertzer (sax), Chris Griffin, Pinky Savitt, Richard Trent, Ruby Weinstein (t), George Arus, Robert Cutshall (tb), Allan Reuss (g), Philip Stephens (b), Ken Lane (p), Maurice Purtill (d), Rosemary Clooney, Frank Sinatra (v).
