= We Kiss in a Shadow =

Song
- Published: 1951
- Songwriter: Oscar Hammerstein II
- Composer: Richard Rodgers

"We Kiss in a Shadow" is a show tune from the 1951 Rodgers and Hammerstein musical, The King and I.

In this song, Tuptim and Lun Tha declare their love for each other, even though they fear that the King of Siam will learn of it.

In the original Broadway production it was performed by Doretta Morrow and Larry Douglas. In the 1956 film version it was sung by Reuben Fuentes, dubbing for Carlos Rivas, and Leona Gordon dubbing for Rita Moreno.

== Recorded versions ==
- June Christy
- Holly Cole
- Perry Como recorded on March 20, 1951
- Vic Damone recorded on May 2, 1958
- Sammy Davis Jr.
- Doris Day
- Martin Denny, Hypnotique, 1958
- Red Garland Trio
- Earl Grant
- Debbie Harwood, Soothe Me, 2004
- Ahmad Jamal, 1961, 1962
- André Kostelanetz
- Kate McGarry
- Dave McKenna
- Doretta Morrow and Larry Douglas on the original cast album, recorded on April 16, 1951
- Cliff Richard, 1961
- Sonny Rollins
- The San Francisco Gay Men's Chorus, 1981
- Neil Sedaka (Oh! Carol: The Complete Recordings (CD 2 of 8))
- Frank Sinatra recorded on March 2, 1951
- Barbra Streisand, The Broadway Album, 1985
- Andy Williams, Andy Williams Sings Rodgers and Hammerstein, 1958
- The Luvs (titled We Kiss in the Shadow) ,1965
