= Marjorie Goetschius =

American composer, pianist, cellist and singer

Marjorie Goetschius (23 September 1915 – 7 May 2001) was an American composer, pianist, cellist, and singer. She was born in Raymond, New Hampshire. Her songs were interpreted by popular singers such as Frank Sinatra and Ray Charles.

== Life ==
Marjorie Goetschius was the granddaughter of Maria Stefany, an opera singer, and Percy Goetschius, a music theorist and composer. She learned to play the piano at the age of five from her mother, Pauline Gaiser (1890–1975), who was a concert pianist. She was educated at Georgian Court College and by her grandparents. She attended the Juilliard School in New York City, where she received instruction from Bernard Wagenaar, James Friskin, and Joseph Schillinger.

Marjorie met her husband Emery Deutsch at the Juilliard School of Music. A composer of serious music for the concert hall, at Deutsch's suggestion Goetschius began composing popular songs. Her song "I Dream of You" stayed on the hit parade for 16 weeks in 1944–45. In addition she wrote several songs with violinist Jascha Heifetz, who used the pseudonym of Jim Hoyl. In 1954, Tony Martin launched "My Bambino", which Goetschius wrote as an adaptation of an Italian lullaby inspired by the birth of her son.

She composed music for piano and played cello and piano in orchestras and radio. Her songs were played by popular musicians such as Frank Sinatra, Ray Charles, Doris Day, Duke Ellington, Johnny Mathis, among others.

== Classical works ==
For piano:

- Sonata in B
- Theme & Variations
- Scherzo in Thirds
- Rondo
- Poetique
- Rhapsody in G

For violin:

- Lament
- Tango del Ensueno
- Valse Burlesque
- Nebuleuses

== Popular songs ==
- "I Dream of You (More Than You Dream I Do)" (1944)
- "I'll Always Be With You" (February 7, 1945)
- "Was the Last Time I Saw You (The Last Time)"
- "So Much in Love"
- "This Is My Confession"
