= I Whistle a Happy Tune =

Song
- Published: 1951
- Songwriters: Richard Rodgers; Oscar Hammerstein II

"I Whistle a Happy Tune" is a show tune from the 1951 Rodgers and Hammerstein musical, The King and I. It is sung by the Governess Anna Leonowens (originally played on Broadway by Gertrude Lawrence) to her son Louis after the curtain rises on Act One of the musical, to persuade him not to be afraid as they arrive in Siam to serve the King.

In the 1956 film version, it was sung by Marni Nixon (dubbing over Deborah Kerr) and Rex Thompson.

In the 1999 animated film version, it was sung by Christiane Noll, Adam Wylie, Charles Clark, Jeff Gunn, David Joyce and Larry Kenton.

== Notable recordings ==
- Julie Andrews - included in the album Rodgers & Hammerstein's The King And I (1992).
- Max Bygraves - included in the album 100 Golden Greats (1976).
- Barbara Cook - The King and I (1960).
- Bing Crosby - recorded the song on April 9. 1951 with Victor Young and His Orchestra.
- Elaine Paige - included in the album The King and I: 2000 London Cast Recording (2000)
- Jane Powell - for her album Something Wonderful (1956).
- Dinah Shore - included in the EP Hits From "The King And I" (1952).
- Frank Sinatra - recorded March 27, 1951 for Columbia Records with Axel Stordahl and His Orchestra.
- The Starlighters - recorded for Capitol Records (catalog No. 1481) (1951).
- Andy Williams released a version of the song on his 1958 album Andy Williams Sings Rodgers and Hammerstein.
- Julie Andrews performed it alongside large Muppet monsters on an episode of The Muppet Show.
- Grover and Cookie Monster performed it on an episode ofSesame Street in the 70s.
