= Mama Will Bark =

Single by Frank Sinatra and Dagmar
- B-side: "I'm a Fool to Want You"
- Recorded: May 10, 1951
- Genre: Traditional pop, Novelty
- Length: 2:55
- Label: Columbia
- Songwriter: Dick Manning
- Producer: Mitch Miller

"Mama Will Bark" is a novelty song written by Dick Manning and recorded as a duet between Frank Sinatra and Dagmar in 1951.

When buxom hostess Dagmar appeared on Sinatra's CBS-TV show on April 7, 1951, Columbia Records A&R head Mitch Miller became intrigued by the comic chemistry he perceived between the unlikely duo. With that in mind, songwriter Dick Manning (who would later compose such hits as "Fascination") penned "Mama Will Bark", which featured off-key talking/singing by Dagmar and sound effects of dogs barking. Miller produced the session on May 10, 1951, and the song was released the following month.

"Mama Will Bark" is commonly cited as an emblematic low point in Sinatra's troubled later years at Columbia. Many Sinatra fans call it his worst recording ever, and place the blame for it squarely on the head of Mitch Miller. In Will Friedwald's book Sinatra! The Song is You, Miller insisted that "nobody brings Sinatra in the studio [to do something] that he doesn't want to do. Then, he had the right to okay its release." Sinatra himself later said of the song: "The only good it did me was with the dogs." Nonetheless, the single (which did not receive an album release) was a hit, nearly reaching the Top 20 on the Billboard singles chart, peaking at #21. Many DJs "flipped over" the record in favor of the B-side, "I'm a Fool to Want You" (which reached #14 on the Billboard charts).
