= Concepts (album) =

Box set by Frank Sinatra
- Released: November 16, 1992
- Recorded: 1953–1960
- Genres: Traditional pop, vocal jazz
- Length: 14:07:45
- Label: Capitol

Frank Sinatra chronology
Sinatra Sings the Songs of Van Heusen & Cahn (1991)	Concepts (1992)	The Columbia Years 1943-1952: The Complete Recordings (1993)

Professional ratings
Review scores
Source	Rating
AllMusic	4/5 stars

Concepts is a 1992 sixteen-disc box set compilation of the American singer Frank Sinatra.

This sixteen CD set was the first major compilation from an entire era of Sinatra's career. This particular set contains every studio album from years with Capitol Records. It also includes the instrumental album Frank Sinatra Conducts Tone Poems of Color, which was new to compact disc with this set. However, it does not include any singles compilations or soundtracks Sinatra released on the label.

== Track listing ==
=== Disc one: Songs for Young Lovers (1954) & Swing Easy! (August 2, 1954) ===
1. "My Funny Valentine" (from Babes In Arms) (Richard Rodgers/Lorenz Hart; arr. by George Sivaro) (from Songs For Young Lovers) – 2:31
2. "The Girl Next Door" (Ralph Blane/Hugh Martin; arr. by Sivaro) (from Songs For Young Lovers) – 2:39
3. "A Foggy Day" (from A Damsel in Distress) (George Gershwin/Ira Gershwin; arr. by Sivaro) (from Songs For Young Lovers) – 2:41
4. "Like Someone in Love" (Jimmy Van Heusen/Johnny Burke; arr. by Nelson Riddle) (from Songs For Young Lovers) – 3:13
5. "I Get a Kick Out of You" (from Anything Goes) (Cole Porter; arr. by Sivaro) (from Songs For Young Lovers) – 2:56
6. "Little Girl Blue" (from Jumbo) (Rodgers/Hart; arr. by Sivaro) (from Songs For Young Lovers) – 2:54
7. "They Can't Take That Away from Me" (from Shall We Dance) (G. Gershwin/I. Gershwin; arr. by Sivaro) (from Songs For Young Lovers) – 1:59
8. "Violets for Your Furs" (Tom Adair/Matt Dennis; arr. by Sivaro) (from Songs For Young Lovers) – 3:07
9. "Just One of Those Things" (from Jubilee) (Porter; arr. by Nelson Riddle) (from Swing Easy!) – 3:14
10. "I'm Gonna Sit Right Down and Write Myself a Letter" (Fred E. Ahlert/Joe Young; arr. by Riddle) (from Swing Easy!) – 2:29
11. "Sunday" (Chester Conn/Benny Krueger/Ned Miller/Jule Styne; arr. by Riddle) (from Swing Easy!) – 2:31
12. "Wrap Your Troubles in Dreams" (Harry Barris, Ted Koehler/Billy Moll; arr. by Riddle) (from Swing Easy!) – 2:17
13. "Taking a Chance on Love" (Vernon Duke/Ted Fetter/John La Touche; arr. by Riddle) (from Swing Easy!) – 2:14
14. "Jeepers Creepers" (Harry Warren/Johnny Mercer; arr. by Riddle) (from Swing Easy!) – 2:24
15. "Get Happy" (from Summer Stock) (Harold Arlen/Koehler; arr. by Riddle) (from Swing Easy!) – 2:27
16. "All of Me" (from Meet Danny Wilson) (Gerald Marks/Seymour Simons; arr. by Riddle) (from Swing Easy!) – 2:08

=== Disc two: In the Wee Small Hours (April 25, 1955) ===
1. "In the Wee Small Hours of the Morning" (Bob Hilliard/David Mann; arr. by Nelson Riddle) – 3:02
2. "Mood Indigo" (Barney Bigard/Duke Ellington/Irving Mills; arr. by Riddle) – 3:32
3. "Glad to Be Unhappy" (from On Your Toes) (Richard Rodgers/Lorenz Hart; arr. by Riddle) – 2:39
4. "I Get Along Without You Very Well (Except Sometimes)" (Hoagy Carmichael/Jane Brown Thompson; arr. by Riddle) – 3:45
5. "Deep in a Dream" (Eddie DeLange/Jimmy Van Heusen; arr. by Riddle) – 2:51
6. "I See Your Face Before Me" (Howard Dietz/Arthur Schwartz; arr. by Riddle) – 3:27
7. "Can't We Be Friends?" (Paul James/Kay Swift; arr. by Riddle) – 2:50
8. "When Your Lover Has Gone" (Einar Aaron Swan; arr. by Riddle) – 3:12
9. "What Is This Thing Called Love?" (from Wake Up and Dream) (Cole Porter; arr. by Riddle) – 2:36
10. "Last Night When We Were Young" (Harold Arlen/Yip Harburg; arr. by Riddle) – 3:18
11. "I'll Be Around" (Alec Wilder; arr. by Riddle) – 3:01
12. "Ill Wind" (Arlen/Ted Koehler; arr. by Riddle) – 3:48
13. "It Never Entered My Mind" (from Higher and Higher) (Rodgers/Hart; arr. by Riddle) – 2:43
14. "Dancing on the Ceiling" (from Ever Green) (Rodgers/Hart; arr. by Riddle) – 3:00
15. "I'll Never Be The Same" (Gus Kahn/Matty Malneck/Frank Signorelli; arr. by Riddle) – 3:07
16. "This Love of Mine" (Sol Parker/Henry W. Sanicola Jr./Frank Sinatra; arr. by Riddle) – 3:35

=== Disc three: Songs for Swingin' Lovers! (March 5, 1956) ===
1. "You Make Me Feel So Young" (Josef Myrow/Mack Gordon; arr. by Nelson Riddle) – 2:57
2. "It Happened in Monterey" (Mabel Wayne/Billy Rose; arr. by Riddle) – 2:37
3. "You're Getting to Be a Habit with Me" (Harry Warren/Al Dubin; arr. by Riddle) – 2:19
4. "You Brought a New Kind of Love to Me" (Sammy Fain/Irving Kahal/Pierre Norman; arr. by Riddle) – 2:49
5. "Too Marvelous for Words" (Richard A. Whiting/Johnny Mercer; arr. by Riddle) – 2:32
6. "Old Devil Moon" (Burton Lane/E.Y. Harburg; arr. by Riddle) – 3:57
7. "Pennies from Heaven" (Arthur Johnston/Johnny Burke; arr. by Riddle) – 2:45
8. "Our Love Is Here to Stay" (from The Goldwyn Follies) (George Gershwin/Ira Gershwin; arr. by Riddle) – 2:42
9. "I've Got You Under My Skin" (from Born To Dance) (Cole Porter; arr. by Riddle) – 3:45
10. "I Thought About You" (Jimmy Van Heusen/Mercer; arr. by Riddle) – 2:31
11. "We'll Be Together Again" (Carl T. Fischer/Frankie Laine; arr. by Riddle) – 4:27
12. "Makin' Whoopee" (Walter Donaldson/Gus Kahn; arr. by Riddle) – 3:08
13. "Swingin' Down the Lane" (Isham Jones/Kahn; arr. by Riddle) – 2:54
14. "Anything Goes" (from Anything Goes) (Porter; arr. by Riddle) – 2:44
15. "How About You?" (Burton Lane/Ralph Freed; arr. by Riddle) – 2:45

=== Disc four: Frank Sinatra Conducts Tone Poems of Color (1956) ===
1. "White" (Norman Sickel; arr. by Victor Young) – 4:14
2. "Green" (Sickel; arr. by Gordon Jenkins) – 4:05
3. "Purple" (Sickel; arr. by Billy May) – 4:21
4. "Yellow" (Sickel; arr. by Jeff Alexander) – 2:38
5. "Gray" (Sickel; arr. by Alec Wilder) – 4:29
6. "Gold" (Sickel; arr. by Nelson Riddle) – 3:36
7. "Orange" (Sickel; arr. by Riddle) – 4:57
8. "Black" (Sickel; arr. by Young) – 3:58
9. "Silver" (Sickel; arr. by Elmer Bernstein) – 4:38
10. "Blue" (Sickel; arr. by Wilder) – 4:38
11. "Brown" (Sickel; arr. by Alexander) – 4:01
12. "Red" (Sickel; arr. by André Previn) – 3:57

=== Disc five: Close to You (1957) ===
1. "Close to You" (Al Hoffman/Carl G. Lampl/Jerry Livingston; arr. by Nelson Riddle) – 3:40
2. "P.S. I Love You" (Gordon Jenkins/Johnny Mercer; arr. by Riddle) – 4:24
3. "Love Locked Out" (Max Kester, Ray Noble; arr. by Riddle) – 2:45
4. "Everything Happens to me" (Adair, Dennis; arr. by Riddle) – 3:22
5. "It's Easy to Remember (And So Hard to Forget)" (from Mississippi) (Rodgers, Hart; arr. by Riddle) – 3:37
6. "Don't Like Goodbyes" (Arlen, Truman Capote; arr. by Riddle) – 4:52
7. "With Every Breath I Take" (Ralph Rainger, Leo Robin; arr. by Riddle) – 3:41
8. "Blame It on My Youth" (Edward Heyman, Oscar Levant; arr. by Riddle) – 3:00
9. "It Could Happen to You" (Burke, Van Heusen; arr. by Riddle) – 3:16
10. "I've Had My Moments" (Donaldson, Kahn; arr. by Riddle) – 3:50
11. "I Couldn't Sleep a Wink Last Night" (Harold Adamson, Jimmy McHugh; arr. by Riddle) – 3:28
12. "The End of a Love Affair" (Edward Redding; arr. by Riddle) – 4:09
13. "If It's the Last Thing I Do" (Sammy Cahn, Saul Chaplin; arr. by Riddle) – 4:00
14. "There's a Flaw in My Flue" (Burke, Van Heusen; arr. by Riddle) – 2:41
15. "Wait Till You See Her" (from By Jupiter) (Rodgers, Hart; arr. by Riddle) – 3:10

=== Disc six: A Swingin' Affair! (May 6, 1957) ===
1. "Night and Day" (from Gay Divorce) (Porter; arr. by Nelson Riddle) – 4:02
2. "I Wish I Were in Love Again" (from Babes In Arms) (Rodgers, Hart; arr. by Riddle) – 2:31
3. "I Got Plenty o' Nuttin'" (from Porgy and Bess) (G. Gershwin, I. Gershwin, DuBose Heyward; arr. by Riddle) – 3:13
4. "I Guess I'll Have to Change My Plan" (Schwartz, Dietz; arr. by Riddle) – 2:26
5. "Nice Work if You Can Get It" (from A Damsel in Distress) (G. Gershwin, I. Gershwin; arr. by Riddle) – 2:24
6. "Stars Fell on Alabama" (Frank Perkins, Mitchell Parish; arr. by Riddle) – 2:41
7. "No One Ever Tells You" (Hub Atwood, Carroll Coates; arr. by Riddle) – 3:28
8. "I Won't Dance" (Jerome Kern, Dorothy Fields; arr. by Riddle) – 3:27
9. "The Lonesome Road" (Nathaniel Shilkret, Gene Austin; arr. by Riddle) – 3:57
10. "At Long Last Love" (from You Never Know) (Porter; arr. by Riddle) – 2:27
11. "You'd Be So Nice to Come Home To" (from Something to Shout About) (Porter; arr. by Riddle) – 2:07
12. "I Got It Bad (and That Ain't Good)" (Ellington, Paul Francis Webster; arr. by Riddle) – 3:25
13. "From This Moment On" (from Out of This World & Kiss Me Kate) (Porter; arr. by Riddle) – 3:56
14. "If I Had You" (Jimmy Campbell, Reginald Connelly, Ted Shapiro; arr. by Riddle) – 2:39
15. "Oh! Look at Me Now" (Joe Bushkin, John DeVries; arr. by Riddle) – 2:50
16. "The Lady Is a Tramp" (from Babes In Arms) (Rodgers, Hart; arr. by Riddle) - 3:16

=== Disc seven: A Jolly Christmas from Frank Sinatra (September 21, 1957) ===
1. "Jingle Bells" (James Pierpont; arr. by Gordon Jenkins/Nelson Riddle) – 2:00
2. "The Christmas Song" (Mel Tormé, Robert Wells; arr. by Jenkins/Riddle) – 3:28
3. "Mistletoe and Holly" (Hank Sanicola, Sinatra, Doc Stanford; arr. by Jenkins/Riddle) – 2:18
4. "I'll Be Home for Christmas" (Kim Gannon, Walter Kent, Buck Ram; arr. by Jenkins/Riddle) – 3:11
5. "The Christmas Waltz" (Cahn, Styne; arr. by Jenkins/Riddle) – 3:03
6. "Have Yourself a Merry Little Christmas" (Blane, Martin; arr. by Jenkins/Riddle) – 3:29
7. "The First Nowell" (William B. Sandys; arr. by Jenkins/Riddle) – 2:44
8. "Hark! The Herald Angels Sing" (Felix Mendelssohn, Charles Wesley; arr. by Jenkins/Riddle) – 2:24
9. "O Little Town of Bethlehem" (Lewis H. Redner, Phillips Brooks; arr. by Jenkins/Riddle) – 2:06
10. "Adeste Fideles" ("O, Come All Ye Faithful") (John Francis Wade; arr. by Jenkins/Riddle) – 2:34
11. "It Came Upon the Midnight Clear" (Edmund Sears, Richard Storrs Willis; arr. by Jenkins/Riddle) – 2:51
12. "Silent Night" (Franz Gruber, Josef Mohr; arr. by Jenkins/Riddle) – 2:31
13. "White Christmas" (Irving Berlin; arr. by Jenkins/Riddle) – 2:37
14. "The Christmas Waltz" (alternate) (Cahn, Styne; arr. by Jenkins/Riddle) – 3:01

=== Disc eight: Where Are You? (September 2, 1957) ===
1. "Where Are You?" (Adamson, McHugh; arr. by Gordon Jenkins) – 3:30
2. "The Night We Called It a Day (Dennis, Adair; arr. by Jenkins) – 3:27
3. "I Cover the Waterfront" (Johnny Green, Edward Heyman; arr. by Jenkins) – 2:59
4. "Maybe You'll Be There" (Rube Bloom, Sammy Gallop; arr. by Jenkins) – 3:06
5. "Laura" (Mercer, David Raksin; arr. by Jenkins) – 3:27
6. "Lonely Town" (Leonard Bernstein, Betty Comden, Adolph Green; arr. by Jenkins) – 4:11
7. "Autumn Leaves" (Jacques Prévert, Mercer, Joseph Kosma; arr. by Jenkins) – 2:51
8. "I'm a Fool to Want You" (Sinatra, Jack Wolf, Joel Herron; arr. by Jenkins) – 4:50
9. "I Think of You" (Jack Elliott, Don Marcotte; arr. by Jenkins) – 3:03
10. "Where Is the One?" (Wilder, Edwin Finckel; arr. by Jenkins) - 3:12
11. "There's No You" (Adair, Hal Hopper; arr. by Jenkins) - 3:45
12. "Baby, Won't You Please Come Home" (Charles Warfield, Clarence Williams; arr. by Jenkins) - 2:57
13. "I Can Read Between the Lines" (Sid Frank, Ray Getzov; arr. by Nelson Riddle) – 2:43
14. "It Worries Me" (Fritz Schultz-Reichel, Carl Sigman; arr. by Riddle) – 2:53
15. "Rain (Falling from the Skies)" (Robert Mellin, Gunther Finlay; arr. by Riddle) – 3:25
16. "Don't Worry 'Bout Me" (Bloom, Koehler; arr. by Riddle) – 3:08

=== Disc nine: Come Fly with Me (January 6, 1958) ===
1. "Come Fly with Me" (Cahn, Van Heusen; arr. by Billy May) – 3:18
2. "Around the World" (Victor Young, Adamson; arr. by May) – 3:20
3. "Isle of Capri" (Will Grosz, Jimmy Kennedy; arr. by May) – 2:29
4. "Moonlight in Vermont" (Karl Suessdorf, John Blackburn; arr. by May) – 3:31
5. "Autumn in New York" (Duke; arr. by May) – 4:36
6. On the Road to Mandalay" (Oley Speaks, Rudyard Kipling; arr. by May) – 3:29
7. "Let's Get Away from It All" (Dennis, Adair; arr. by May) – 2:10
8. "April in Paris" (Duke, Harburg; arr. by May) – 2:50
9. "London By Night" (Carroll Coates; arr. by May) – 3:30
10. "Brazil" (Ary Barroso, Bob Russell; arr. by May) – 2:55
11. "Blue Hawaii" (Rainger, Robin; arr. by May) – 2:43
12. "It's Nice to Go Trav'ling" (Cahn, Van Heusen; arr. by May) – 3:49
13. "Chicago" (Fred Fisher; arr. by Nelson Riddle) – 2:14
14. "South of the Border" (Kennedy, Michael Carr; arr. by Riddle) – 2:50
15. "I Love Paris" (Porter; arr. by Riddle) – 1:49

=== Disc ten: Frank Sinatra Sings for Only the Lonely (September 8, 1958) ===
1. "Only the Lonely" (Cahn, Van Heusen; arr. by Nelson Riddle) - 4:10
2. "Angel Eyes" (Dennis, Earl Brent; arr. by Riddle) - 3:46
3. "What's New?" (Bob Haggart, Burke; arr. by Riddle) - 5:13
4. "It's a Lonesome Old Town" (Harry Tobias, Charles Kisco; arr. by Riddle) - 4:18
5. "Willow Weep for Me" (Ann Ronell; arr. by Riddle) - 4:19
6. "Goodbye" (Jenkins; arr. by Riddle) - 5:45
7. "Blues in the Night" (Arlen, Mercer; arr. by Riddle) - 4:44
8. "Guess I'll Hang My Tears Out to Dry" (Cahn, Styne; arr. by Riddle) - 4:00
9. "Ebb Tide" (Robert Maxwell, Carl Sigman; arr. by Riddle) - 3:18
10. "Spring is Here" (from I Married An Angel) (Rodgers, Hart; arr. by Riddle) - 4:47
11. "Gone with the Wind" (Allie Wrubel, Herb Magidson; arr. by Riddle) - 5:15
12. "One for My Baby (and One More for the Road)" (from The Sky's the Limit) (Arlen, Mercer; arr. by Riddle) - 4:23
13. "Sleep Warm" (Lew Spence, Marilyn Keith, Alan Bergman; arr. by Riddle) - 2:45
14. "Where or When" (from Babes In Arms) (Rodgers, Hart; arr. by Riddle) - 2:25

=== Disc eleven: Come Dance with Me! (January 5, 1959) ===
1. "Come Dance with Me" (Cahn, Van Heusen; arr. by Billy May/Heinie Beau) – 2:31
2. "Something's Gotta Give" (Mercer; arr. by May/Beau) – 2:38
3. "Just in Time" (Styne, Comden, Green; arr. by May/Beau) – 2:24
4. "Dancing in the Dark" (Schwartz, Dietz; arr. by May/Beau) – 2:26
5. "Too Close for Comfort" (Jerry Bock, Larry Holofcener, George David Weiss; arr. by May/Beau) – 2:34
6. "I Could Have Danced All Night" (Alan Jay Lerner, Frederick Loewe; arr. by May/Beau) – 2:40
7. "Saturday Night (Is the Loneliest Night of the Week)" (Cahn, Stynel; arr. by May/Beau) – 1:54
8. "Day In, Day Out" (Bloom, Mercer; arr. by May/Beau) – 3:25
9. "Cheek to Cheek" (Berlin; arr. by May/Beau) – 3:06
10. "Baubles, Bangles and Beads" (Robert Wright, George Forrest; arr. by May/Beau) – 2:46
11. "The Song Is You" (Jerome Kern, Hammerstein II; arr. by May/Beau) – 2:43
12. "The Last Dance" (Cahn, Van Heusen; arr. by May/Beau) – 2:11
13. "It All Depends on You" (Buddy DeSylva, Lew Brown, Ray Henderson; arr. by May/Beau) – 2:06
14. "Nothing in Common" (duet with Keely Smith) (Cahn, Van Heusen; arr. by May/Beau) – 2:32
15. "Same Old Song and Dance" (Cahn, Van Heusen, Bobby Worth; arr. by May/Beau) – 2:52
16. "How Are Ya' Fixed for Love?" (duet with Keely Smith) (Cahn, Van Heusen; arr. by May/Beau) – 2:25

=== Disc twelve: No One Cares (July 20, 1959) ===
1. "When No One Cares" (Cahn, Van Heusen; arr. by Gordon Jenkins) – 2:42
2. "A Cottage for Sale" (Larry Conley, Willard Robison; arr. by Jenkins) – 3:16
3. "Stormy Weather" (Arlen, Koehler; arr. by Jenkins) – 3:20
4. "Where Do You Go?" (Arnold Sundgaard, Wilder; arr. by Jenkins) – 2:34
5. "I Don't Stand a Ghost of a Chance with You" (Bing Crosby, Ned Washington, Young; arr. by Jenkins) – 3:16
6. "Here's That Rainy Day" (Burke, Van Heusen; arr. by Jenkins) – 3:34
7. "I Can't Get Started" (Duke, I. Gershwin; arr. by Jenkins) – 4:01
8. "Why Try to Change Me Now?" (Cy Coleman, Joseph Allan McCarthy; arr. by Jenkins) – 3:41
9. "Just Friends" (John Klenner, Sam M. Lewis; arr. by Jenkins) – 3:40
10. "I'll Never Smile Again" (Lowe; arr. by Jenkins) – 3:46
11. "None But the Lonely Heart" (Pyotr Il'yich Tchaikovsky, Bill Westbrook; arr. by Jenkins) – 3:41
12. "The One I Love (Belongs to Somebody Else)" (Jones, Kahn; arr. by Jenkins) – 3:05
13. "This Was My Love" (Jim Harbert; arr. by Jenkins) – 3:28
14. "I Could Have Told You" (Carl Sigman, Van Heusen; arr. by Jenkins) – 3:18
15. "You Forgot All the Words (While I Still Remember the Tune)" (Bernie Wayne, E.H. Jay; arr. by Jenkins) – 3:24

=== Disc thirteen: Nice 'n' Easy (July 25, 1960) ===
1. "Nice 'n' Easy" (Spence, A. Bergman, M. Bergman; arr. by Nelson Riddle) – 2:45
2. "That Old Feeling" (Lew Brown, Fain; arr. by Riddle) – 3:33
3. "How Deep Is The Ocean?" (Berlin; arr. by Riddle) – 3:15
4. "I've Got a Crush on You" (G. Gershwin, I. Gershwin; arr. by Riddle) – 2:16
5. "You Go To My Head" (J. Fred Coots, Haven Gillespie; arr. by Riddle) – 4:28
6. "Fools Rush In (Where Angels Fear to Tread)" (Bloom, Mercer; arr. by Riddle) – 3:22
7. "Nevertheless (I'm In Love With You)" (Bert Kalmar, Harry Ruby; arr. by Riddle) – 3:18
8. "She's Funny That Way" (Neil Moret, Richard A. Whiting; arr. by Riddle) – 3:55
9. "Try a Little Tenderness" (Jimmy Campbell, Reginald Connelly, Harry M. Woods; arr. by Riddle) – 3:22
10. "Embraceable You" (G. Gershwin, I. Gershwin; arr. by Riddle) – 3:24
11. "Mam'selle" (Gordon, Edmund Goulding; arr. by Riddle) – 2:48
12. "Dream" (Mercer; arr. by Riddle) – 2:57
13. "The Nearness of You" (Hoagy Carmichael, Washington; arr. by Riddle) - 2:44
14. "Someone to Watch over Me" (G. Gershwin, I. Gershwin; arr. by Riddle) - 2:57
15. "Day In, Day Out" (Bloom, Mercer; arr. by Riddle) - 3:07
16. "My One and Only Love" (Wood, Mellin; arr. by Riddle) - 3:12

=== Disc fourteen: Sinatra's Swingin' Session!!! (1961) ===
1. "When You're Smiling" (Mark Fisher, Joe Goodwin, Larry Shay; arr. by Nelson Riddle) – 2:00
2. "Blue Moon" (Rodgers, Hart; arr. by Riddle) – 2:51
3. "S'Posin" (Paul Denniker, Andy Razaf; arr. by Riddle) – 1:48
4. "It All Depends on You" (Buddy G. DeSylva, Lew Brown, Ray Henderson; arr. by Riddle) – 2:02
5. "It's Only a Paper Moon" (Arlen, Harburg, Rose; arr. by Riddle) – 2:19
6. "My Blue Heaven" (Donaldson, George A. Whiting; arr. by Riddle) – 2:03
7. "Should I?" (Arthur Freed, Nacio Herb Brown; arr. by Riddle) – 1:30
8. "September in the Rain" (Warren, Dubin; arr. by Riddle) – 2:58
9. "Always" (Berlin) (arr. by Riddle) – 2:17
10. "I Can't Believe That You're in Love with Me" (Clarence Gaskill, McHugh) (arr. by Riddle) – 2:25
11. "I Concentrate on You" (Porter) (arr. by Riddle) – 2:23
12. "You Do Something to Me" (Porter) (arr. by Riddle) – 1:33
13. "Sentimental Baby" (Spence, A. Bergman, M. Bergman) (arr. by Riddle) – 2:36
14. "Hidden Persuasion" (Wainwright Churchill III) (arr. by Riddle) – 2:25
15. "Ol' McDonald" (Traditional, A. Bergman, M. Bergman, Spence) (arr. by Riddle) – 2:41

=== Disc fifteen: Come Swing with Me! (1961) ===
1. "Day by Day" (Axel Stordahl, Paul Weston, Cahn) (arr. by Billy May) – 2:39
2. "Sentimental Journey" (Brown, Ben Homer, Bud Green) (arr. by Heinie Beau) – 3:26
3. "Almost Like Being in Love" (Loewe, Lerner) (arr. by May) – 2:02
4. "Five Minutes More" (Cahn, Styne) (arr. by May) – 2:36
5. "American Beauty Rose" (Mack David, Redd Evans, Arthur Altman) (arr. by Beau) – 2:22
6. "Yes Indeed!" (Sy Oliver) (arr. by May) – 2:35
7. "On the Sunny Side of the Street" (McHugh, Fields) (arr. by May) – 2:42
8. "Don't Take Your Love From Me" (Henry Nemo) (arr. by Beau) – 1:59
9. "That Old Black Magic" (Arlen, Mercer) (arr. by Beau) – 4:05
10. "Lover" (Rodgers, Hart) (arr. by Beau) – 1:53
11. "Paper Doll" (Johnny S. Black) (arr. by May) – 2:08
12. "I've Heard That Song Before" (Cahn, Styne) (arr. by May) – 2:33
13. "I Love You" (Harry Archer, Harlan Thompson) (arr. by May) – 2:28
14. "Why Should I Cry over You?" (Chester Conn, Ned Miller) (arr. by Nelson Riddle) – 2:41
15. "How Could You Do a Thing Like That to Me" (Tyree Glenn, Allan Roberts) (arr. by Riddle) – 2:44
16. "River, Stay 'Way from My Door" (Matt Dixon, Harry M. Woods) (arr. by Riddle) – 2:39
17. "I Gotta Right to Sing the Blues" (Arlen, Koehler) (arr. by Skip Martin) - 3:00

=== Disc sixteen: Point of No Return (March, 1962) ===
1. "(Ah, the Apple Trees) When the World Was Young" (Mercer, M. Philippe-Gerard, Angele Marie T. Vannier) (arr. by Axel Stordahl/Heinie Beau) - 3:48
2. "I'll Remember April" (Don Raye, Gene de Paul, Patricia Johnston) (arr. by Stordahl/Beau) - 2:50
3. "September Song" (Kurt Weill, Maxwell Anderson) (arr. by Stordahl/Beau) - 4:21
4. "A Million Dreams Ago" (Lew Quadling, Eddie Howard, Dick Jurgens) (arr. by Stordahl/Beau) - 2:41
5. "I'll See You Again" (Noël Coward) (arr. by Stordahl/Beau) - 2:44
6. "There Will Never Be Another You" (Gordon, Warren) (arr. by Stordahl/Beau) - 3:09
7. "Somewhere Along the Way" (Van Heusen (under "Kurt Adams" pseudonym), Sammy Gallop) (arr. by Stordahl/Beau) - 3:01
8. "It's a Blue World" (Bob Wright, Chet Forrest) (arr. by Stordahl/Beau) - 2:49
9. "These Foolish Things (Remind Me of You)" (Jack Strachey, Harry Link, Holt Marvell) (arr. by Stordahl/Beau) - 3:59
10. "As Time Goes By" (Herman Hupfeld) (arr. by Stordahl/Beau) - 3:17
11. "I'll Be Seeing You" (Fain, Irving Kahal) (arr. by Stordahl/Beau) - 2:47
12. "Memories of You" (Eubie Blake, Razaf) (arr. by Stordahl/Beau) - 3:53
13. "Day In, Day Out" (Rube Bloom, Mercer) (arr. by Stordahl/Beau) – 3:19
14. "Don't Make a Beggar of Me" (Al Sherman) (arr. by Stordahl/Beau) – 3:04
15. "Lean Baby" (Roy Alfred, Billy May) (arr. by Stordahl/Beau) – 2:34
16. "I'm Walking Behind You" (Billy Reid) (arr. by Stordahl/Beau) – 2:58

== Personnel ==
- Frank Sinatra - vocals
- Gordon Jenkins - arranger, conductor
- Heinie Beau - arranger
- Ted Allan - Photography
- Paul Atkinson - Reissue Producer
- Sid Avery - Photography
- Brad Benedict - Photo Research
- Sammy Cahn - Liner Notes
- Dave Cavanaugh - Producer
- William Claxton - Photography
- Will Friedwald - Liner Notes
- Voyle Gilmore - Producer
- Concetta Halstead - Design
- Gene Howard - Photography
- Skip Martin - Arranger, Conductor
- Billy May - Arranger, Conductor
- Bill Miller - Producer
- Nelson Riddle - Arranger, Conductor
- Norman Sickel - Poetry
- Keely Smith - Performer
- Tommy Steele - Art Direction
- Axel Stordahl - Arranger, Conductor
- Jimmy Van Heusen - Liner Notes
- Ken Veeder - Photography
- Larry Walsh - Remastering, Digital Remastering
- Pete Welding - Liner Notes, Compilation, Reissue Compilation
- Tim Weston - Design
- Bob Willoughby - Photography
