= Like Someone in Love (Ella Fitzgerald album) =

Studio album by Ella Fitzgerald
- Released: 1957
- Recorded: October 15 & 28, 1957
- Studios: Capitol Studios; Hollywood, CA
- Genres: Jazz; lounge
- Length: 68:29
- Label: Verve
- Producer: Norman Granz

Ella Fitzgerald chronology
Ella and Her Fellas (1957)	Like Someone in Love (1957)	One O'Clock Jump (1957)

Like Someone in Love is a 1957 studio album by the American jazz singer Ella Fitzgerald, with a studio orchestra arranged and conducted by Frank DeVol. This album represents a fine example of Ella's singing from this period, recorded at the same time as her albums with Louis Armstrong.

== History ==
The album was also recorded in the midst of her epic 'Songbooks' project, celebrating the composers of the 'Great American Songbook' and Broadway. The album features only four songs written by the composers featured in her 'Songbooks', instead concentrating on very famous ballads by lesser known writers. Some songs on the album were also recorded with Armstrong on the albums that they collaborated on from this period. Stan Getz is featured on tenor sax on four tracks, including "Midnight Sun" and "You're Blasé". Ted Nash plays the alto sax and solos. The cover photos are by Phil Stern.

== Reception ==
Professional ratings
Review scores
Source	Rating
AllMusic	3/5 stars
Encyclopedia of Popular Music	5/5 stars
The Penguin Guide to Jazz	4/4 stars

Writing for AllMusic, music critic Scott Yanow wrote of the album: "Most of the songs are veteran standards... her voice was so strong and appealing during this era that all of her recordings from the mid- to late '50s are enjoyable and easily recommended".

== Track listing ==
For the 1957 Verve album Someone in Love, Verve MGV-4004

Side one:

1. "There's a Lull in My Life" (Mack Gordon, Harry Revel) – 3:23
2. "More Than You Know" (Edward Eliscu, Billy Rose, Vincent Youmans) – 3:14
3. "What Will I Tell My Heart?" (Irving Gordon, Jack Lawrence, Peter Tinturin) – 3:27
4. "I Never Had A Chance" (Irving Berlin) – 2:44
5. "Close Your Eyes" (Bernice Petkere) – 2:54
6. "We'll Be Together Again" (Carl T. Fischer, Frankie Laine) – 3:18
7. "Then I'll Be Tired Of You" (Yip Harburg, Arthur Schwartz) – 3:10
8. "Like Someone in Love" (Johnny Burke, Jimmy Van Heusen) – 3:07

Side two:

1. "Midnight Sun" (Sonny Burke, Lionel Hampton, Johnny Mercer) – 3:54
2. "I Thought About You" (Mercer, Van Heusen) – 2:51
3. "You're Blasé" (Ord Hamilton, Bruce Sievier) – 3:55
4. "Night Wind" (Lew Pollack, Bob Rothberg) – 3:16
5. "What's New?" (Johnny Burke, Bob Haggart) – 3:04
6. "Hurry Home" (Buddy Bernier, Bob Emmerich, Joseph Meyer) – 4:37
7. "How Long Has This Been Going On?" (George Gershwin, Ira Gershwin) – 5:48

Bonus Tracks; Issued on the 1991 Verve CD re-issue Like Someone in Love, Verve 314-511 524-2

16. "I'll Never Be The Same" (Gus Kahn, Matty Malneck, Frank Signorelli) – 4:23
17. "Lost in a Fog" (Dorothy Fields, Jimmy McHugh) – 3:59
18. "Everything Happens to Me" (Tom Adair, Matt Dennis) – 3:51
19. "So Rare" (Jerry Herst, Jack Sharpe) – 3:34

Tracks 1–11 recorded October 15, 1957, in Hollywood, Los Angeles

Tracks 12–19 recorded October 28, 1957, in Hollywood, Los Angeles

== Personnel ==
- Ella Fitzgerald – vocals
- Frank DeVol – arranger, conductor
- Stan Getz – saxophone
