= Hello, Love (Ella Fitzgerald album) =

Hello Love

Studio album by Ella Fitzgerald
- Released: 1959
- Recorded: July 24, 1957, & March 25, 1959
- Genre: Jazz
- Length: 39:47
- Label: Verve
- Producer: Norman Granz

Ella Fitzgerald chronology
Porgy & Bess (1958)	Hello Love (1959)	Get Happy! (1959)

Professional ratings
Review scores
Source	Rating
AllMusic	3.5/5 stars

Hello Love is a 1959 studio album by the American jazz singer Ella Fitzgerald, recorded over two sessions in 1957 and 1959.

The album focuses on well known songs not included in Fitzgerald's epic Songbooks project, and several of the songs are tunes that she had recently recorded in duet with Louis Armstrong.

== Track listing ==
For the 1959 Verve LP release, Verve VS-4034; re-issued in 2004 on CD, Verve 0602498625811

Side One:

1. "You Go to My Head" (John Frederick Coots, Haven Gillespie) – 4:38
2. "Willow Weep for Me" (Ann Ronell) – 4:03
3. "I'm Thru with Love" (Gus Kahn, Fud Livingston, Matty Malneck) – 3:48
4. "Spring Will Be a Little Late This Year" (Frank Loesser) – 3:20
5. "Everything Happens to Me" (Tom Adair, Matt Dennis) – 3:55
6. "Lost in a Fog" (Dorothy Fields, Jimmy McHugh) – 4:04

Side Two:

1. "I've Grown Accustomed to His Face" (Alan Jay Lerner, Frederick Loewe) – 3:07
2. "I'll Never Be the Same" (Kahn, Malneck, Frank Signorelli) – 4:27
3. "So Rare" (Jerry Herst, Jack Sharpe) – 3:37
4. "Tenderly" (Walter Gross, Jack Lawrence) – 3:12
5. "Stairway to the Stars" (Malneck, Mitchell Parish, Signorelli) – 2:54
6. "Moonlight in Vermont" (John Blackburn, Karl Suessdorf) – 3:20

== Personnel ==
- Ella Fitzgerald – vocals
- Frank DeVol – arranger, conductor
- Milt Bernhart – trombone
- George Roberts
- Lloyd Ulyate
- Pete Candoli – trumpet
- Harry "Sweets" Edison
- Ray Linn
- George Werth
- Clint Neagley – alto saxophone
- Ben Webster – tenor saxophone
- Bert Gassman – oboe
- Arnold Koblentz
- Gordon Schoneberg
- Skeets Herfurt – woodwind
- Joseph J. Koch
- Ernest Romersa
- Norm Herzberg – bassoon
- Kenneth Lowman
- Jack Marsh
- Martin Ruderman – flute
- Sylvia Ruderman
- Milt Holland – percussion
- Barney Kessel – guitar
- Abe Luboff – double bass
- Joe Mondragon
- Philip Stephens
- Alvin Stoller – drums
- Arnold Ross – piano
- Dorothy Remsen – harp
