= Songs for Swingin' Lovers! =

Studio album by Frank Sinatra
- Released: March 5, 1956
- Recorded: October 1955–January 1956
- Studio: Capitol Studio A (Hollywood)
- Genres: Swing; traditional pop; jazz
- Length: 43:59
- Label: Capitol
- Producer: Voyle Gilmore

Frank Sinatra chronology
In the Wee Small Hours (1955)	Songs for Swingin' Lovers! (1956)	This Is Sinatra! (1956)

Songs for Swingin' Lovers! is the tenth studio album by American singer Frank Sinatra, and his fourth for Capitol Records. It was arranged by Nelson Riddle and released in March 1956 on LP and January 1987 on CD. It was the first album ever to top the UK Albums Chart, which was published for the first time on 22 July 1956.

== Production ==
This album was arranged by Nelson Riddle, and took a different tack after In the Wee Small Hours (1955), recording existing pop standards in a hipper, jazzier fashion, revealing an overall exuberance in the vein of Songs for Young Lovers and Swing Easy!.

An additional track, "Memories of You", was recorded during the sessions but ultimately left off the album. As a slow ballad, it was deemed inappropriate on an album of "swinging" uptempo numbers since the album already included the ballad "We'll Be Together Again". While Sinatra would re-record the song with Axel Stordahl in 1961 for the album Point of No Return, the 1956 recording with Riddle would remain unreleased until its inclusion on The Longines Symphonette album Sinatra Like Never Before (SYS-5637), released in September 1973 as a bonus LP in the 10-album boxed set Sinatra, The Works. The 1956 recording eventually reached a wider audience when released on The Capitol Years compilation in 1990.

The original cover had Sinatra facing away from the young couple, but in 1957 Capitol altered the cover with a new image of Sinatra facing the couple. Most CD releases have retained the new cover, though Apple Music uses the original.

== Legacy ==
Professional ratings
Review scores
Source	Rating
AllMusic	5/5 stars
Encyclopedia of Popular Music	5/5 stars
Uncut	5/5 stars

In 2000, the album was inducted into the Grammy Hall of Fame, and ranked number 306 on Rolling Stone magazine's list of the 500 greatest albums of all time in 2003, and 308 in 2012 revised list. Sinatra aficionados often rank it his best or second-best album (to In the Wee Small Hours) and many music critics consider it one of the greatest albums of its era.

In 2000 it was voted number 100 in Colin Larkin's All Time Top 1000 Albums.

The LP was the first number one album in the UK. It was knocked off the top after two weeks by Carousel (the 1956 movie's soundtrack).

In 2025, Uncut ranked it at number 18 in their list of "The 500 Greatest Albums of the 1950s". Contributor Nick Hasted wrote that Sinatra countered rock and roll "with some hip teenage exuberance from the spirited end of the songbook", elaborating:

"Elvis Presley's self-titled debut album was released, like Songs for Swingin' Lovers, in March 1956, with "Heartbreak Hotel" heading to No 1 and Little Richard also climbing the charts, as rock'n'roll conquered young America. Though Sinatra may have thought it beneath him, his record effectively answered the new sound. While the truly conservative singer Pat Boone neutered "Tutti Frutti" for cleaned-up chart action, the rhythmic roar of Riddle's orchestra let Sinatra reform his own musical kingdom with sleek contemporary lines, purring power and sexy intimacy, making hoary standards sound freshy minted. "I've Got You Under My Skin" is, in its way, as rock'n'roll as anything released that year."

== Releases ==
Songs for Swingin' Lovers! was released in March 5, 1956 on LP and January 1987 on CD. In February 2014, Mobile Fidelity Sound Lab released a hybrid disc (SACD + CD) of the album. The original 1956 front cover art was re-used for this issue.

== Track listing ==
Side 1
No.	Title	Writer(s)	Length
1.	"You Make Me Feel So Young"	Josef Myrow; Mack Gordon	2:57
2.	"It Happened in Monterey"	Mabel Wayne; Billy Rose	2:36
3.	"You're Getting to Be a Habit with Me"	Harry Warren; Al Dubin	2:19
4.	"You Brought a New Kind of Love to Me"	Sammy Fain; Irving Kahal; Pierre Norman	2:48
5.	"Too Marvelous for Words"	Richard A. Whiting; Johnny Mercer	2:29
6.	"Old Devil Moon"	Burton Lane; E.Y. Harburg	3:56
7.	"Pennies from Heaven"	Arthur Johnston; Johnny Burke	2:44
8.	"Love Is Here to Stay"	George Gershwin; Ira Gershwin	2:42

Side 2
No.	Title	Writer(s)	Length
9.	"I've Got You Under My Skin"	Cole Porter	3:43
10.	"I Thought About You"	Jimmy Van Heusen; Mercer	2:30
11.	"We'll Be Together Again"	Carl T. Fischer; Frankie Laine	4:26
12.	"Makin' Whoopee"	Walter Donaldson; Gus Kahn	3:06
13.	"Swingin' Down the Lane"	Isham Jones; Kahn	2:54
14.	"Anything Goes"	Porter	2:43
15.	"How About You?"	Lane; Ralph Freed	2:45
Total length:			43:59

== Charts ==
=== Weekly charts ===
Weekly chart performance for Songs for Swingin' Lovers!
Chart (1956)	Peak position
UK Albums (Official Charts)	1
US Billboard 200	2

Chart (2021–2026)	Peak position
Croatian International Albums (HDU)	34
US Top Jazz Albums (Billboard)	7
US Top Traditional Jazz Albums (Billboard)	5

=== Monthly charts ===
Monthly chart performance for Songs for Swingin' Lovers!
Chart (2026)	Peak position
German Jazz Albums (Offizielle Top 100)	9

== Certifications ==
Region	Certification	Certified units/sales
United Kingdom (BPI)	Gold	100,000^{*}
United States (RIAA)	Gold	500,000^{^}
^{*} Sales figures based on certification alone.^{^} Shipments figures based on certification alone.
