= The Best of the Capitol Years (Frank Sinatra album) =

Compilation album by Frank Sinatra
- Released: November 3, 1992
- Recorded: April 30, 1953 – April 13, 1960
- Genre: Traditional pop, vocal jazz
- Length: 58:51
- Label: Capitol

Frank Sinatra chronology
Sinatra: Soundtrack To The CBS Mini-Series (1992)	The Best of the Capitol Years (1992)	Concepts (1992)

The Best of the Capitol Years is a 1992 compilation album by American singer Frank Sinatra, consisting of 20 tracks selected from the three-CD box set The Capitol Years, released two years earlier.

== Track listing ==
1. "I've Got the World on a String" (Harold Arlen, Ted Koehler) - 2:13
2. "South of the Border" (Jimmy Kennedy, Michael Carr) - 2:52
3. "I Get a Kick Out of You" (Cole Porter) - 2:52
4. "Young at Heart" (Carolyn Leigh, Johnny Richards) - 2:50
5. "Three Coins in the Fountain" (Sammy Cahn, Jule Styne) - 3:07
6. "What Is This Thing Called Love?" (Porter) - 2:34
7. "In the Wee Small Hours of the Morning" (Bob Hilliard, David Mann) - 3:00
8. "Learnin' the Blues" (Dolores Silvers) - 3:04
9. "Love and Marriage" (Cahn, Jimmy Van Heusen) - 2:38
10. "(Love Is) The Tender Trap" (Cahn, Van Heusen) - 3:00
11. "You Make Me Feel So Young" (Josef Myrow, Mack Gordon) - 2:58
12. "I've Got You Under My Skin" (Porter) - 3:46
13. "(How Little It Matters) How Little We Know" (Leigh, Phillip Springer) - 2:40
14. "The Lady Is a Tramp" (Richard Rodgers, Lorenz Hart) - 3:15
15. "Night and Day" (Porter) - 4:02
16. "Witchcraft" (Leigh, Cy Coleman) - 2:55
17. "All the Way" (Cahn, Van Heusen) - 2:55
18. "Come Fly with Me" (Cahn, Van Heusen) - 3:20
19. "High Hopes" (Cahn, Van Heusen) - 2:45
20. "Nice 'n' Easy" (Alan and Marilyn Bergman, Lew Spence) - 2:44
