= Sinatra: Soundtrack to the CBS Mini-Series =

Compilation album by Frank Sinatra
- Released: October 20, 1992
- Recorded: November 23, 1931 – September 19, 1979
- Genre: Traditional pop, vocal jazz
- Length: 105:51
- Label: Reprise

Frank Sinatra chronology
Sinatra Sings the Songs of Van Heusen & Cahn (1991)	Sinatra: Soundtrack to the CBS Mini-Series (1992)	The Best of the Capitol Years (1992)

Sinatra: Soundtrack To The CBS Mini-Series is a 1992 double disc compilation album by American singer Frank Sinatra.

== Track listing ==
=== Disc one ===
1. "Where the Blue of the Night (Meets the Gold of the Day)" (Bing Crosby, Roy Turk, Fred E. Ahlert)
2. "Temptation" (Nacio Herb Brown, Arthur Freed)
3. "All or Nothing at All" (Jack Lawrence,
4. "Shake Down the Stars" (Ed DeLange, Jimmy Van Heusen)
5. "Without a Song" (Billy Rose, Vincent Youmans, Edward Eliscu)
6. "Street of Dreams" (Victor Young, Sam M. Lewis)
7. "I'll Be Seeing You" (Sammy Fain, Irving Kahal)
8. "I'll Never Smile Again" (Ruth Lowe)
9. "Sing, Sing, Sing (With a Swing)" (Louis Prima)
10. "Where or When" (Richard Rodgers, Lorenz Hart)
11. "Stormy Weather" (Harold Arlen, Ted Koehler)
12. "Our Love Affair" (Roger Edens, Arthur Freed)
13. "I Fall In Love Too Easily" (Sammy Cahn, Jule Styne)
14. "The Hucklebuck" (Roy Alfred, Andy Gibson, Charlie Parker)
15. "Fairy Tale" (Jay Livingston, Jo Stafford)

=== Disc two ===
1. "Lover Man (Oh, Where Can You Be?)" (Jimmy Davis, Ram Ramirez)
2. "You Go to My Head" (J. Fred Coots, Haven Gillespie)
3. "I'm a Fool to Want You" (Frank Sinatra, Jack Wolf, Joel Herron)
4. "It Was a Very Good Year" (Ervin Drake)
5. "Autumn in New York" (Vernon Duke)
6. "It All Depends on You" (B.G. DeSylva, Lew Brown, Ray Henderson)
7. "They Can't Take That Away from Me" (George Gershwin, Ira Gershwin)
8. "Come Fly with Me" (Cahn, Van Heusen)
9. "High Hopes" (Cahn, Van Heusen)
10. "One for My Baby (And One More for the Road)" (Arlen, Johnny Mercer)
11. "You Make Me Feel So Young" (Josef Myrow, Mack Gordon)
12. "That's Life" (Dean Kay Thompson, Kelly Gordon)
13. "All the Way" (Cahn, Van Heusen)
14. "New York, New York" (Fred Ebb, John Kander)
15. "My Way" (Paul Anka, Claude Francois, Jacques Revaux, Gillies Thibaut)
