= The Reprise Collection =

Box set by Frank Sinatra
- Released: November 23, 1990
- Recorded: December 19, 1960–October 30, 1986
- Genre: Traditional pop
- Length: 272:57
- Label: Reprise

Frank Sinatra chronology
Capitol Collector's Series (1989)	The Reprise Collection (1990)	The Capitol Years (1990)

Professional ratings
Review scores
Source	Rating
Allmusic	4.5/5 stars

The Reprise Collection is a 1990 box set by the American singer Frank Sinatra.

Released to coincide with Sinatra's 75th birthday, this four-disc set has an abundance of classic Sinatra performances from his career with Reprise Records, spanning the years 1960 to 1986.

A single disc version called Sinatra Reprise: The Very Good Years was released in 1991.

== Track listing ==
=== Disc one ===
1. "Let's Fall in Love" (Harold Arlen, Ted Koehler) - 2:11
  Recorded on December 19, 1960
2. "You'd Be So Easy to Love" (Cole Porter) - 2:24
3. "The Coffee Song (They've Got An Awful Lot of Coffee in Brazil)" (Bob Hilliard, Dick Miles) - 2:51
  Recorded on December 20, 1960
4. "Zing! Went the Strings of My Heart" (James F. Hanley) - 2:48
5. "The Last Dance" (Sammy Cahn, Jimmy Van Heusen) - 2:46
6. "The Second Time Around" (Cahn, Van Heusen) – 3:03
7. "Tina" (Cahn, Van Heusen) - 2:54
  Recorded on December 21, 1960
8. "Without a Song" (Vincent Youmans, Billy Rose, Edward Eliscu) – 3:39
  Recorded on May 2, 1961
9. "It Started All Over Again" (Carl T. Fischer, Bill Carey) – 2:32
  Recorded on May 3, 1961
10. "Love Walked In" (George Gershwin, Ira Gershwin) – 2:19
  Recorded on May 18, 1961
11. "You're Nobody till Somebody Loves You" (James Cavanaugh, Russ Morgan, Larry Stock) – 4:09
  Recorded on May 23, 1961
12. "Don't Take Your Love from Me" (Henry Nemo) - 4:05
  Recorded on November 21, 1961
13. "Come Rain or Come Shine" (Arlen, Johnny Mercer) – 4:06
14. "Night and Day" (Porter) – 3:37
  Recorded on November 22, 1961
15. "All Alone" (Irving Berlin) – 2:42
  Recorded on January 15, 1962
16. "What'll I Do?" (Berlin) – 3:15
  Recorded on January 17, 1962
17. "I Get a Kick Out of You" (Porter) – 3:14
  Recorded on April 10, 1962
18. "Don'cha Go 'Way Mad" (Jimmy Mundy, Al Stillman, Illinois Jacquet) – 3:12
  Recorded on April 11, 1962
19. "A Garden in the Rain" (James Dyrenforth, Carroll Gibbons) – 3:24
  Recorded on June 12, 1962
20. "A Nightingale Sang in Berkeley Square" (Eric Maschwitz, Manning Sherwin) – 3:54
  Recorded on June 13, 1962
21. "Please Be Kind" (Saul Chaplin, Cahn) – 2:43
  Recorded on October 2, 1962

=== Disc two ===
1. "Pennies from Heaven" (Johnny Burke, Arthur Johnston) - 3:27
  Recorded on October 3, 1962
2. "Me And My Shadow" [with Sammy Davis Jr.] (Dave Dreyer, Al Jolson, Billy Rose) - 3:06
  Recorded on October 22, 1962
3. "I Have Dreamed" (Oscar Hammerstein II, Richard Rodgers) - 2:57
  Recorded on February 19, 1963
4. "America the Beautiful" (Katherine Lee Bates, Samuel Ward) - 2:21
5. "California" (Cahn, Van Heusen) – 3:37
  Recorded on February 20, 1963
6. "Soliloquy" (Hammerstein, Rodgers) - 8:06
  Recorded on February 21, 1963
7. "Luck Be a Lady" (Frank Loesser) - 5:14
  Recorded on July 25, 1963
8. "Here's to the Losers" (Jack Segal, Robert Wells) - 3:04
  Recorded on July 31, 1963
9. "The Way You Look Tonight" (Jerome Kern, Dorothy Fields) - 3:22
  Recorded on January 27, 1964
10. "My Kind of Town" (Cahn, Van Heusen) - 3:08
  Recorded on April 8, 1964
11. "The Best Is Yet to Come" (Cy Coleman, Carolyn Leigh) - 2:54
12. "Fly Me To The Moon" (Bart Howard) - 2:49
  Recorded on June 9, 1964
13. "September Song" (Maxwell Anderson, Kurt Weill) - 3:30
  Recorded on April 13, 1965
14. "It Was a Very Good Year" (Ervin Drake) - 4:27
15. "This Is All I Ask" (Gordon Jenkins) - 3:03
  Recorded on April 22, 1965
16. "I'll Only Miss Her When I Think of Her" (Cahn, Van Heusen) - 2:51
  Recorded on August 23, 1965
17. "Love and Marriage" (Cahn, Van Heusen) - 2:12
  Recorded on October 21, 1965
18. "Moonlight Serenade" (Glenn Miller, Mitchell Parish) – 3:26
  Recorded on November 29, 1965
19. "I Wished on the Moon" (Dorothy Parker, Ralph Rainger)- 2:53
20. "Oh, You Crazy Moon" (Burke, Van Heusen) - 3:13
  Recorded on November 30, 1965

=== Disc three ===
1. "I've Got You Under My Skin" (Porter) – 3:43
2. "The Shadow of Your Smile" (Johnny Mandel, Paul Francis Webster) – 2:31
3. "Street of Dreams" (Victor Young, Samuel Lewis) – 2:16
4. "You Make Me Feel So Young" (Mack Gordon, Joe Myrow) – 3:21
  Recorded live at the Sands Hotel, January–February, 1966
5. "Strangers in the Night" (Bert Kaempfert, Charles Singleton, Eddie Snyder) – 2:25
  Recorded on April 11, 1966
6. "Summer Wind" (Heinz Meier, Hans Bradtke, Mercer) – 2:53
7. "All or Nothing at All" (Arthur Altman, Jack Lawrence) – 3:57
  Recorded on May 16, 1966
8. "That's Life" (Kelly Gordon, Dean Kay) – 3:10
  Recorded on October 18, 1966
9. "I Concentrate on You" (Porter) – 2:32
10. "Dindi" (Ray Gilbert, Antonio Carlos Jobim, Aloysio de Oliveria) – 3:25
  Recorded on January 30, 1967
11. "Once I Loved (O Amor em Paz)" (Jobim, Gilbert, Vinícius de Moraes) – 2:37
12. "How Insensitive (Insensatez)" (Jobim, Norman Gimbel, de Moraes) – 3:15
13. "Drinking Again" (Mercer, Doris Tauber) – 3:13
14. "Somethin' Stupid" [with Nancy Sinatra] (Carson Parks) – 2:45
  Recorded on February 1, 1967
15. "All I Need Is the Girl" (Stephen Sondheim, Jule Styne) – 5:01
16. "Indian Summer" (Victor Herbert, Al Dubin) – 4:14
  Recorded on December 11, 1967
17. "My Way" (Paul Anka, Claude François, Jacques Revaux, Gilles Thibault) – 4:35
  Recorded on December 30, 1968
18. "Wave" (Jobim) – 3:25
  Recorded on February 11, 1969
19. "A Man Alone" (Rod McKuen) - 3:47
  Recorded on March 20, 1969
20. "Forget to Remember" (Victoria Pike, Teddy Randazzo) - 2:58
  Recorded on August 18, 1969

=== Disc four ===
1. "There Used to Be a Ballpark" (Joe Raposo) – 3:34
  Recorded on June 22, 1973
2. "What Are You Doing the Rest of Your Life?" (Alan Bergman, Marilyn Bergman, Michel Legrand) – 4:05
  Recorded on May 21, 1974
3. "Just as Though You Were Here" (John Benson Brooks, Eddie DeLange) - 4:22
  Recorded on September 24, 1974
4. "The Lady Is a Tramp" (Rodgers, Hart) - 2:56
  Recorded live at Madison Square Garden, October 13, 1974
5. "Empty Tables" (Van Heusen, Mercer) - 2:48
6. "Send in the Clowns" (Sondheim) - 3:36
  Recorded on February 5, 1976
7. "I Love My Wife" (Coleman, Michael Stewart) - 3:10
  Recorded on November 12, 1976
8. "Nancy (With the Laughing Face)" (Phil Silvers, Van Heusen) - 2:28
9. "Emily" (Johnny Mandel, Mercer) - 3:00
10. "Sweet Lorraine" (Cliff Burwell, Mitchell Parish) - 2:22
  Recorded on March 14, 1977
11. "My Shining Hour" (Arlen, Mercer) - 3:23
12. "More Than You Know" (Eliscu, Rose, Youmans) - 3:25
  Recorded on September 17, 1979
13. "The Song Is You" (Hammerstein, Kern) - 2:40
  Recorded on September 18, 1979
14. "Theme from New York, New York" (Fred Ebb, John Kander) - 3:26
  Recorded on September 19, 1979
15. "Something" (George Harrison) - 4:43
  Recorded on December 3, 1979
16. Medley: "The Gal That Got Away"/"It Never Entered My Mind" (Arlen, I. Gershwin)/(Rodgers, Hart) - 5:50
  Recorded on April 8, 1981
17. "A Long Night" (Alec Wilder, Loonis McGlohon) - 3:44
  Recorded on July 20, 1981
18. "Here's to the Band" (Sharman Howe, Alfred Nittoli, Artie Schroeck) - 4:09
  Recorded on January 25, 1983
19. "It's Sunday" (Susan Birkenhead, Styne) - 3:26
  Recorded on February 28, 1983
20. "Mack the Knife" (Marc Blitzstein, Bertolt Brecht, Kurt Weill) - 4:52
  Recorded on October 30, 1986

== Personnel ==
- Frank Sinatra - vocals
- Nancy Sinatra
- Sammy Davis Jr.
- Antonio Carlos Jobim - vocals, guitar
- Don Costa - arranger, conductor
- Ernie Freeman
- Neal Hefti
- Gordon Jenkins
- Quincy Jones
- Skip Martin
- Billy May
- Sy Oliver
- Marty Paich
- Nelson Riddle
- Felix Slatkin
- Torrie Zito
- Morris Stoloff
- Count Basie and his orchestra
- Woody Herman and his orchestra
