= Jerry Herst =

- Born: Jerome Philip Herst; May 28, 1909; Chicago, Illinois, U.S.
- Died: November 27, 1990 (aged 81); Alameda, California, U.S.
- Education: Northwestern University; University of California, Berkeley; University of California, Hastings College of Law; Conservatoire de Paris
- Occupations: Lawyer, Songwriter
- Years active: 1930s–1975
- Known for: Composer of So Rare (1937)
- Spouse: Jeanne Lucille Taylor (m. 1947)

Jerome Philip Herst (May 28, 1909, in Chicago, Illinois – November 27, 1990, in Alameda, California), known as Jerry Herst, was a lawyer and a songwriter best known for his collaborations with Jack Sharpe on a number of compositions, notably "So Rare", a much-recorded song that was published in 1937.

== Early life ==
In 1909, was born in Chicago to Abraham and Dora Schwartz. On December 24, 1947, he married Jeannde Lucille Taylor.

== Education ==
His early education was in Townsend Hall in New York, followed by Western Military, in Alton Illinois. He attended college at Northwestern University and University of California, Berkeley. In 1934, he received his JD from University of California, Hastings College of Law, San Francisco. He studied music at the Conservatoire de Paris, and later studied composition privately with Joseph Schillinger, Mario Castelnuovo-Tedesco and Alexandre Tansman.

== Career ==
=== Music ===
While in college and law school he performed as a radio and night club performer.

A version of his co-composition "So Rare" released by Jimmy Dorsey in 1957 was a #2 hit in the United States, but it has been recorded by numerous artists including Carl Ravell and his Orchestra (1937), Gus Arnheim and his Coconut Grove Orchestra (1937), Guy Lombardo and his Royal Canadians (1937), Andy Williams (1959), Ella Fitzgerald (1960) and Ray Conniff (1965).

Herst has five compositions listed at the performing rights organisation ASCAP, four of which are collaborations with Jack Sharpe. "So Rare", "World Stands Still" and "What Did You Do It For" are by Herst and Sharpe. "We'll Get A Bang Out Of Life" was written by Herst and Sharpe with the bandleader Anson Weeks and was recorded by Kay Kyser and His Orchestra (1938). A number of other compositions by Jerry Herst – including further collaborations with Jack Sharpe – are listed at the US Copyright Office.

In addition to Jack Sharpe, he collaborated with such names as Al Jacobs, Felton Kaufmann, and Richard O’Kreamer.

=== Legal ===
Practiced law from 1935 to 1942. He served as a referee and hearing officer for the State of California Office of Administrative Procedure from 1947 to 1975. Served as an administrative law judge for the State of California until his retirement in 1975

=== Military ===
Was on active duty in the USNR, World War II. Served in the United States Naval Reserves as Judge Advocate General Court Martial, 12 Naval District (1942–1946), Senior Judge Advocate until his retirement.

== Compositions ==
=== Songs ===
- So Rare (with Jack Sharpe)
- The Call of Tarzan
- The Darling of the Campus
- As Long As I Still Have You – 1931 (with Al Jacobs)
- We’ll Get a Bang Out of Life – 1938 (with Jack Sharpe)
- Shower of Kisses
- Meand’rin
- Mud in Your Eye (with Felton Kauffman)

=== Instrumental works ===
- A Child’s Garden (suite for symphonic orchestra)
- The Golden Spike (overture)

Miscellaneous – numerous ballets and wind quintet

=== Musicals ===
- The Musical Adventures of Tom Sawyer
- The Legend of Bret Harte
- Ozma of Oz
