= Three Little Girls in Blue =

1946 film by H. Bruce Humberstone

- Theatrical release poster
- Directed by: H. Bruce Humberstone
- Screenplay by: Valentine Davies
- Adaptation by: Brown Holmes; Lynn Starling; Robert Ellis; Helen Logan
- Based on: Three Blind Mice; 1938 play by Stephen Powys
- Produced by: Mack Gordon
- Starring: June Haver; George Montgomery; Vivian Blaine; Celeste Holm; Vera-Ellen; Frank Latimore
- Cinematography: Ernest Palmer; Charles G. Clarke
- Edited by: Barbara McLean
- Music by: Mack Gordon; Josef Myrow
- Production company: 20th Century-Fox
- Distributed by: 20th Century-Fox
- Release date: September 3, 1946
- Running time: 93 minutes
- Language: English
- Budget: $2,335,000
- Box office: $3 million (US and Canada rentals)

Three Little Girls in Blue is a 1946 American Technicolor musical comedy film directed by H. Bruce Humberstone and starring June Haver, George Montgomery, Vivian Blaine, Celeste Holm, Vera-Ellen, and Frank Latimore. The 20th Century-Fox film was adapted from Stephen Powys' 1938 play Three Blind Mice and featured songs with music by Josef Myrow and lyrics by Mack Gordon. The score is notable for the first appearance of the song "You Make Me Feel So Young".

== Plot ==
In 1902 Red Bank, New Jersey, sisters of modest means Pam, Liz, and Myra Charters inherit a chicken farm from their aunt. They soon discover that the windfall is not quite enough to finance their dreams of attracting and marrying millionaires. Reasoning that if one of them catches a rich husband, the other two will thereafter find it easier to do the same, they decide to pool their inheritances. Pam poses as a wealthy heiress, Liz poses as her social secretary, and Myra poses as her maid.

The three go to Atlantic City, check into a luxurious hotel, and promptly meet millionaire Steve Harrington. When Steve sends a bottle of champagne to Pam, Myra meets Mike, a waiter who becomes taken with her. A third man, Steve's friend Van Damm Smith, ostensibly another millionaire, joins in the following day when the girls' plot to interest Steve by pretending to be drowning goes awry. Steve and Van both court Pam, while Myra and Mike fall in love. Although ostensibly pursuing Pam, Steve begins to be attracted to Liz. Van proposes to Pam; however, she tells him the truth about her plan to marry a rich man and he in turn reveals that he is not really rich and is also scheming to marry a rich woman. The two call off their romance, deciding to stick to their plans of marrying money. Van helps Pam by telling Steve that she is in love with him; Steve proposes to Pam and she accepts.

The couples are all sorted out after a trip to Harrington's family home in Maryland, with some help from Steve's sister Miriam. Steve finally realizes he is in love with Liz, Van and Pam decide they would rather be with one another, and Mike and Myra are married.

== Cast ==
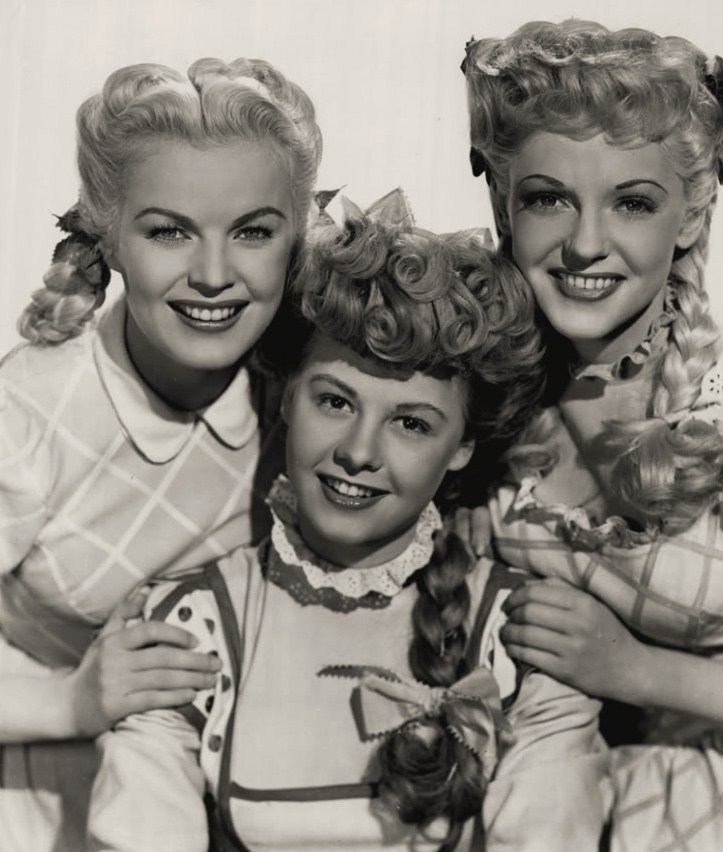
June Haver, Vera-Ellen, and Vivian Blaine in a publicity still for Three Little Girls in Blue

- June Haver as Pam Charters
- George Montgomery as Van Damm Smith
- Vivian Blaine as Liz Charters
- Celeste Holm as Miriam Harrington
- Vera-Ellen as Myra Charters
- Frank Latimore as Steve Harrington
- Charles Smith as Mike Bailey (uncredited)

== Production ==
Production on this movie began in November 1945 and was completed in February 1946, over 100 days of shooting at a cost of $2,335,000. The main cast members were all on contract to Fox; Celeste Holm made her Hollywood film debut as Miriam Harrington.

It was reported 20th Century-Fox wanted Broadway actor/dancer Harold Lang for the role of Vera-Ellen's boyfriend Mike but he had to refuse because of stage commitments. His replacement was Charles Smith.

=== Screenplay ===
Valentine Davies adapted the screenplay from the play Three Blind Mice which was credited to Stephen Powys, the professional alias of Guy Bolton. (Note: "Stephen Powys" was a pseudonym used by Virginia de Lanty, Bolton's wife; however, Three Blind Mice is generally considered to be the work of Bolton himself.) Fox had acquired the American rights to the play in 1937, first making a non-musical 1938 movie (also called Three Blind Mice). (Note: The play itself was not staged until early 1938 in London.) It was adapted as the movie musical Moon Over Miami in 1941 before being tapped again five years later as the basis for Three Little Girls in Blue. The plot—three fortune-hunting sisters encounter humorous difficulties—was scarcely altered; even the character names are largely unchanged from the play. The locale was shifted to Atlantic City and the timeframe moved to 1902, reflecting a turn-of-the-century theme popular in musicals at the time.

=== Music ===
Mack Gordon, who also produced the film, wrote the lyrics and Josef Myrow composed most of the songs for Three Little Girls in Blue, including "On the Boardwalk (in Atlantic City)", "Somewhere in the Night", and "You Make Me Feel So Young". Initially, Gordon thought "You Make Me Feel So Young" too modern for the 1902 setting, but when Darryl F. Zanuck heard all the music played, he insisted on using it three times in the movie.

"This Is Always", composed by Harry Warren with lyrics by Gordon, was sung by Haver and Ben Gage (singing for Montgomery) in production, but the number did not make the final cut. This duet for Haver and Montgomery was set on the beach at night. It was presumably deleted because it had close-ups of Montgomery, who reportedly had demanded a salary increase after production had started. The outtake remains in the trailer. The song was nominated for the Academy Award for Best Original Song, but its nomination was revoked shortly after nominations were announced because the song did not appear in the finished film.

"If You Can't Get a Girl in the Summertime", playing in the background while Haver and Montgomery dance, was not written for the film but was composed in 1915 by Harry Tierney with lyrics by Bert Kalmar.

Several of the main roles were not sung by the actors portraying them. Vera-Ellen's singing voice was dubbed by Carol Stewart, Ben Gage dubbed for George Montgomery, Bob Scott sang for Frank Latimore, and Del Porter for Charles Smith.

== Release ==
Three Little Girls in Blue premiered at the Apollo Theatre in Atlantic City on September 3, 1946, opened in New York on September 26, and opened across the United States in October. It was one of six films to earn over $3 million for Fox in 1946.

=== Reviews ===
Bosley Crowther of The New York Times gave the film a reserved but positive review, calling it "just a sprightly, happy show"; Holm and Vera-Ellen were singled out for praise, as was the score. The industry paper Film Daily also discounted the story but praised the score and the production; this review, too, took note of the performances of Holm and Vera-Ellen.
