= On the Boardwalk (In Atlantic City) =

Song by June Haver Vivian Blaine Vera-Ellen
- Released: 1946
- Length: 3:41
- Composer: Josef Myrow
- Lyricist: Mack Gordon

"On the Boardwalk (In Atlantic City)" is a song from the 1946 musical film Three Little Girls in Blue sung by June Haver, Vivian Blaine and Vera-Ellen.

== History ==
The song has been covered by artists including Dick Haymes, Al Alberts and The Charioteers. The Charioteers cover reached No. 12 on the charts. The song remains a summer classic in Philadelphia, its metropolitan area, and at the Jersey Shore.

In the beginning of the 1980 film, Atlantic City starring Burt Lancaster and Susan Sarandon, the song is played when Dave and Chrissie enter Resorts, and during the credits.

The song describes Atlantic City during its heyday in the early-to-mid 20th-century. The song makes reference to a number of longtime Atlantic City features including the rolling chairs and the boardwalk. The salt-water air (the Jersey Shore's temperatures are cooler than the city during the summer and made Atlantic City an especially popular attraction prior to air conditioning being widespread) is also mentioned.
