= This Love of Mine =

1941 song by Tommy Dorsey

Single by Tommy Dorsey and His Orchestra with Frank Sinatra

from the album Frank Sinatra discography#Compilation albums
- A-side: "Neiani"
- Released: July 11, 1941
- Genre: pop
- Length: 3:40
- Label: RCA Victor
- Composers: Sol Parker; Hank Sanicola
- Lyricist: Frank Sinatra

1941 sheet music cover, Embassy Music, New York

"This Love of Mine" is a popular American song that was first recorded in 1941 by Tommy Dorsey and his orchestra, with a vocal by Frank Sinatra. Sinatra wrote the words and Sol Parker and Hank Sanicola wrote the music. The recording reached #3 on the Billboard pop singles chart in 1941.

== Background ==
The Tommy Dorsey recording was released as a 78 RCA Victor B side single, 27508-B, with Frank Sinatra on vocals backed with "Neiani", which did not chart. "This Love of Mine" reached #3 on the Billboard pop singles chart in 1941–42 in a chart run of 24 weeks. Sinatra re-recorded the song with Nelson Riddle in 1955 for the In The Wee Small Hours album.

The song was copyrighted on August 11, 1941 by Embassy Music. Frank Sinatra wrote the lyrics. The music was composed by Sol Parker and Hank Sanicola.

== Other recordings ==
The song became a pop and jazz standard that has been recorded by other performers. Artists who have recorded the song include:

- Little Anthony & the Imperials
- Count Basie
- Shirley Bassey for her album Shirley Bassey (1961)
- Michael Bublé
- Ray Charles
- Freddy Cole
- Wes Montgomery
- Ray Conniff for his album "Just Kiddin' Around with Billy Butterfield (1963)
- Bing Crosby - Songs I Wish I Had Sung the First Time Around (1956)
- Sammy Davis Jr. for the album Mood to Be Wooed (1958)
- Bill Doggett
- Mike Elliott
- Ray Ellis
- Ferrante and Teicher
- Ella Fitzgerald
- Nancy Sinatra
- Al Martino
- Marian McPartland
- Frank Morgan - Mood Indigo (1989)
- Tony Mottola
- Sonny Rollins
- Keely Smith for her album Keely Sings Sinatra (2001).
- Van Morrison
- Dinah Washington - for her album Unforgettable (1961)
- Lawrence Welk
- Alex Amen

== Album appearances ==
The song appears on the following Frank Sinatra albums:

- In the Wee Small Hours (1955)
- This Love of Mine (1969)
- Concepts (1992)
- The Capitol Years (1998)
- Frank Sinatra & the Tommy Dorsey Orchestra (1998)
- Gold Collection (2001)
- All or Nothing at All (2002)

== Sources ==
- Granata, Charles L. (1999). Sessions with Sinatra: Frank Sinatra and the Art of Recording. Chicago Review Press. ISBN 1-55652-509-5
- Phasey, Chris (1995). Francis Albert Sinatra: Tracked Down (Discography). Buckland Publications. ISBN 0-7212-0935-1
- Summers, Antony and Swan, Robbyn (2005). Sinatra: The Life. Doubleday. ISBN 0-552-15331-1
