= In the Wee Small Hours =

1955 studio album by Frank Sinatra

Studio album by Frank Sinatra
- Released: April 25, 1955
- Recorded: March 1, 1954 ("Last Night When We Were Young"); February 8 – March 4, 1955
- Studios: KHJ, Hollywood
- Genres: Vocal jazz; traditional pop
- Length: 49:52
- Language: English
- Label: Capitol
- Producer: Voyle Gilmore

Frank Sinatra chronology
Swing Easy! (1954)	In the Wee Small Hours (1955)	Songs for Swingin' Lovers! (1956)

In the Wee Small Hours is the ninth studio album by the American singer Frank Sinatra, released on April 25, 1955, by Capitol Records. Produced by Voyle Gilmore with arrangements by Nelson Riddle, the album's songs deal with themes such as introspection, melancholy, lost love, failed relationships, depression and night life; as such, it has been called one of the first concept albums. The cover artwork reflects these themes, portraying Sinatra alone at night on an eerie and deserted city street awash in blue-tinged street lights.

The album was a commercial success, cementing Sinatra's career resurgence after releasing a string of hit singles and two prior albums with Capitol, and winning an Academy Award for his role in the 1953 film From Here to Eternity. In the Wee Small Hours peaked at number two on the US Billboard 200 chart, where it stayed for 18 weeks, becoming Sinatra's highest-charting album since Songs by Sinatra in 1947. It was issued as two 10-inch LP discs, but also as one 12-inch record LP, making it one of the first of its kind in the pop field. It was also issued as four four-song 45 rpm EP discs sold in cardboard sleeves with the same cover as the LPs. The success of the album helped popularize the 12-inch LP in popular music, and the 10-inch format quickly fell into obsolescence.

Critically acclaimed since its initial release, Rolling Stone ranked it number 100 on their list of The 500 Greatest Albums of All Time in 2003, dropping it to number 101 in the 2012 revision and to number 282 in the 2020 update; it maintained its ranking of 282 in the 2023 update as well. Sinatra would successfully continue recording "concept" albums with later releases such as Songs for Swingin' Lovers! (1956), Where Are You? (1957), Only the Lonely (1958) and No One Cares (1959).

== Background ==
By the early 1950s, Sinatra saw his career in decline, his teen "bobby soxer" audience having lost interest in him as he entered his late 30s. In 1951, he went so far as to attempt suicide, according to one author. Later that year, a second season of The Frank Sinatra Show was aired on CBS, but failed to receive the same positive reception the first season had, with its host having lost his previous energy. Later, Sinatra was dropped from Columbia.

Against the wishes of his colleagues, on March 14, 1953, vice president of A&R at Capitol Alan Livingston signed Sinatra to a seven-year deal. The deal proved to be a success; later that year in August, Sinatra appeared as Private Angelo Maggio in the film From Here to Eternity. The film was successful and his performance was acclaimed, winning the Academy Award for Best Supporting Actor and the Golden Globe Award for Best Supporting Actor. With this new popularity, he recorded two 10-inch LP albums, Songs for Young Lovers and Swing Easy!, which both peaked at number three on the Billboard album chart, with the latter reaching number five on the UK Album Charts. His performance as the lead character in The Man with the Golden Arm earned him nominations for Best Actor at the Academy Awards and the BAFTA awards.

=== Relationship troubles ===
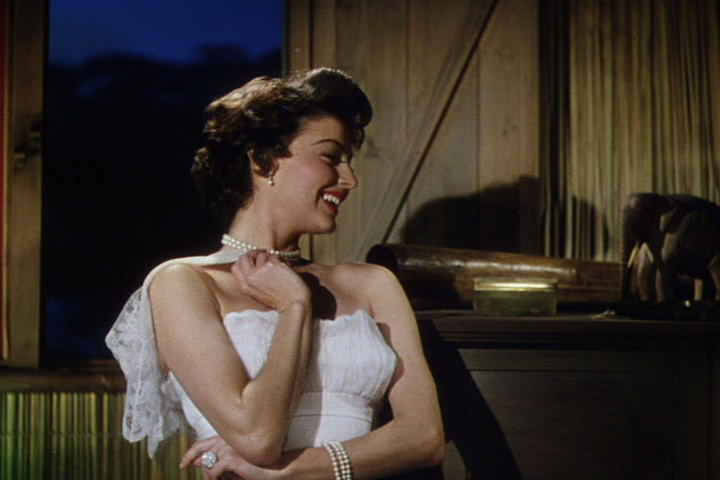
Ava Gardner, Sinatra's second wife, provided inspiration for the album

By the time he recorded In the Wee Small Hours, Sinatra witnessed the end of several relationships. He and his first wife, Nancy Barbato, separated on Valentine's Day 1950. While still married, he began a relationship with Ava Gardner. After he and Barbato divorced in October 1951, he married Gardner ten days later. But they were both jealous of the other's extramarital affairs. The relationship deteriorated during the recording of Songs for Young Lovers.

Gardner left Sinatra two months after the release of From Here to Eternity, divorcing in 1957. She said, "We don't have the ability to live together like any normal married couple." It is assumed that this album's grouping of "love gone bad" songs, and Sinatra's poignant renderings, were a direct result of Sinatra's failing relationship with Gardner, to the point that these are called "Ava Songs".

Riddle credited Sinatra's loss of Gardner with his ability to sing the type of songs contained in this album. The failure of this relationship did not shatter Sinatra but instead caused him to sing more emotionally. In the midst of these personal disturbances, Sinatra began selecting songs for a new album. He would rehearse each one of them reiteratively at home with Bill Miller, his pianist.

== Recording ==
Sinatra's vision for the album distinguished him from many other pop acts of the time, most of whom put out records that were little more than collections of already released singles. He created a firm distinction between songs intended as singles for radio airplay and for jukeboxes, and those songs he intended to package together in an album. Thus, the sessions intended for album releases tended to be more serious, with a focus on artistic experimentation rather than strict commercial success.

In the Wee Small Hours was recorded before stereophonic technology, but the fidelity of this monophonic album feels "warm" to modern ears. The album was recorded in five sessions at KHJ Studios, Hollywood. These sessions took place on February 8, 16, and 17, and April 1 and 4, and would start at 8:00 P.M., continuing till past midnight. The sessions were recorded in Studio C, located downstairs, which was a smaller studio designed to record small ensembles. The first four songs recorded specifically for this album ("Can't We Be Friends", "Dancing on the Ceiling", "Glad to Be Unhappy", "I'll Be Around") were not recorded with any brass or strings, but were sparsely arranged. Although the arrangements were Riddle's, there was no need for a conductor, so pianist Bill Miller managed from his instrument.

Set against his then-current relationship troubles, Sinatra set out to record "angst-ridden" songs involving lost love. Sinatra was very tense during the recording of the album, reportedly breaking down and crying after the master take of "When Your Lover Has Gone". Rita Kirwan of Music magazine witnessed one of the sessions, and her account goes thus:

Sinatra takes a gulp of the lukewarm coffee remaining in the cup most recently handed to him, and then he lifts the inevitable hat from his head a little, and plops it right back, almost as if he wanted to relieve the pressure from the hat band. The studio empties fast; just music stands and chairs remain. Sinatra flops onto one of the chairs, crosses his legs, and hums a fragment of one of the songs he's been recording. He waves to the night janitor now straightening up the studio, and says: "Jeez, what crazy working hours we got. We both should've been plumbers, huh?"

Nelson Riddle commented on Sinatra's work ethic and its effect on Riddle's arrangements and the studio orchestra:

You have to be right on mettle all the time. The man, himself, somehow draws everything out of you, and he has the same effect on the boys in the band. They know he means business, so they pull everything out."

Sinatra was meticulous about the quality of the sessions for In the Wee Small Hours. Guitarist George Van Eps recalls that Sinatra stopped a session after singing only a few notes because he felt his voice did not have "the right sound" at the time. The session was rescheduled for the following night, and Van Eps felt it "was perfect." Sinatra also carefully sequenced the songs, with input from Miller and Riddle, for the LP he personally referred to as "the Ava album."

Sinatra's voice was maturing at this point, and he had matured musically regarding intonation and vocal shading. He had also become more comfortable with improvising rhythmically within the confines of Riddle's arrangements. Slight technical imperfections by Sinatra have been found in this recording, but the overall emotional effect compensates completely, so that the listener attributes any shortcomings to the sincere human expressions of the singer.

=== Songs ===
With the exception of the title track, the songs are from the Great American Songbook. "Can't We Be Friends?" opens with a set of chords on minimalist guitar. Sinatra's interpretation runs from placid to profligate. "Dancing on the Ceiling" is among the songs recorded with only a small group. It is a rarity among Riddle arrangements; he rarely created scores for small jazz ensembles.

"Deep in a Dream" is identified by critic Will Friedwald as an example of Sinatra's ability to interpret songs in that the song could easily be delivered as "detached" or "hysterical", but Sinatra finds the perfect balance. The song was considered for inclusion in Trilogy: Past Present Future but did not make the final cut. "Glad to Be Unhappy" was a forgotten song until Sinatra brought it into popular consciousness. In this album it receives small-group jazz treatment.

"I Get Along Without You Very Well" is an "exquisitely ironic" piece written by Hoagy Carmichael with lyrics based on a poem by Jane Brown Thompson. Although Sinatra's relationship with Gardner ended badly, author James Kaplan suggests this song set the album's mood of "capitulation, not retaliation". "I See Your Face Before Me" was Nelson Riddle's favorite and was the first song he arranged: he created a setting for it while at Ridgefield High School. The arrangement for "I'll Be Around" is a musical pun in that the celesta plays a circular riff. "I'll Never Be the Same" uses a "wind chime" motif, which came from Riddle's appreciation of French impressionist music. He uses this same mini-theme briefly in "It Never Entered My Mind" and in "Gone With the Wind" from the 1958 album Frank Sinatra Sings for Only the Lonely. "Ill Wind" features extended jazz solos by Harry Edison and Skeets Herfurt.

The title track came about by happenstance. Composers Bob Hilliard and David Mann were in New York City to visit a publisher. They spotted Sinatra and Riddle and decided to show them their new composition "In the Wee Small Hours of the Morning." Sinatra liked the song and wanted to use it immediately. Sinatra recorded "It Never Entered My Mind" in 1947 for Columbia. It was part of the Rodgers and Hart Broadway show Higher and Higher. Ironically, this song, which was a long-time resident in Sinatra's repertoire, was cut from the film version, Sinatra's cinematic debut.

Recorded nearly a year before all other selections, "Last Night When We Were Young" was difficult, according to Riddle, because about thirty takes were used. The recording uses a "low-key" coda, emphasizing strings and horns, and a brief guitar solo. Sinatra was involved in the production and felt that the guitar solo needed to be slowed considerably. He held Riddle and the musicians in high esteem, so he talked with guitarist George Van Eps about the change, then discussed it separately with Riddle. Van Eps commented, "Frank was loaded with things like that." The finale is a "cataclysmic climax." Sinatra recorded the song with an arrangement by Gordon Jenkins for the album September of My Years (1965). Last Night was written for the movie Metropolitan (1935) but was cut from the final version, appearing only as an instrumental during the credits. The song includes advanced harmonic progressions and a juxtaposition of chromaticism and octave leaps.

In addition to "Ill Wind", "Mood Indigo" by Duke Ellington is the purest jazz song on the album. A motif developed by Riddle became the descending riff in Sinatra's hit "Witchcraft". Sinatra would include a blues-based selection such as this on each of his "downbeat" albums.

"This Love of Mine" was recorded by Sinatra in 1941 when he was with the Tommy Dorsey orchestra. In this 1955 version Sinatra gives a more mature reading to the lyrics. Riddle brings a rich arrangement to the harmonically simple song, which assists the mood presented in the album. "What Is This Thing Called Love?" is noted by Charles Granata for its "most expressive vocal shading". Sinatra's voice approaches the bass range at times, and the interpretation is noted for the lyrical liberties Sinatra takes with Porter's lyrics. The song was recorded in 21 takes. "When Your Lover Has Gone" had a great effect on Lester Young. Young asked record store clerk Bob Sherrick to "Let me hear something by my man, Frank." In the Wee Small Hours had been recently released, and Sherrick played this song for Young. Young left the record shop muttering to himself that he had to record it himself on his next session.

== Artwork ==
The cover artwork is designed to set the mood for the music. It shows Sinatra alone after dark on an eerie and deserted street awash in blue-tinged street lights, reflecting the album's themes of introspection, lost love, failed relationships, depression and night life. It is significant that Sinatra is depicted alone, as loneliness during the "Wee Small Hours" is a theme of the album. Rather than at a rakish angle, Sinatra's snap-brim fedora hat is pushed back, suggesting resignation and openness. The artwork is reminiscent of film noir poster art and hardboiled/pulp fiction book covers.

== Themes ==
Themes of loss, and love's bittersweet relationship to loss, pervade the album. Yet the ending tone is not one of despair, but of hope and survival as made possible by cathartic reflection. Perhaps given as kindly advice by a person of experience, Jonathan Schwartz believes the album refrains from being "mushy" but instead presents the material in a stately manner. Sinatra's next album, Songs for Swingin' Lovers!, seems to follow up on this promise by depicting an individual who is "free to enjoy women again". These two albums well represent the "heartbroken/ hedonistic duality" of Sinatra's persona in the mid-1950s.

== Releases ==
Sinatra intended the album to be his first 12-inch LP, but it was initially released as a two-volume set, each set containing eight songs, as a set of 2 ten-inch LPs (Capitol H-581 PT1 and PT2) and as a set of two 45 rpm EP sets, each of 2 discs. The album was released in April 1955. Taken as a whole, the collection is Sinatra's first truly full-length album. Capitol record executives were concerned that an entire album of "dark" material would disaffect the record-buying public. It peaked at number 2 on the Billboard 200, where it remained for 18 weeks, the longest time Sinatra had held a spot in the top-ten at the time, and also his highest-charting album since Songs by Sinatra. On September 6, 2002, it was certified Gold by the RIAA, meaning it had shifted over 500,000 units.

In 1992, the label reissued the CD with all 16 tracks. In 1998 the album was remastered using 20-bit technology under Larry Walsh's supervision at Capitol Recording Studios. Since 1998, recognizing Sinatra's enduring worldwide popularity, In the Wee Small Hours has been reissued several times on vinyl, compact disc, and digital download.

== Reception ==
=== Popular reception ===
The album was popular on its release. In the United States the album was listed at number two at its peak and appeared on the charts for eighteen weeks. In August 1962 it re-entered the Billboard album charts.

=== Critical reception ===
Professional ratings
Review scores
Source	Rating
AllMusic	5/5 stars
Rolling Stone	5/5 stars
Encyclopedia of Popular Music	5/5 stars
Uncut	5/5 stars

Since its release, In the Wee Small Hours has been regarded as one of Sinatra's best, often ranked with Songs for Swingin' Lovers! (1956) and Frank Sinatra Sings for Only the Lonely (1958). It is also considered by many to be one of the best vocal jazz releases of all time. It received immediate critical acclaim on its release.

In 2000, it was voted number 359 in Colin Larkin's All Time Top 1000 Albums. Stephen Thomas Erlewine commented in AllMusic that the album had an authentic melancholy mood, and is "one of Sinatra's most jazz-oriented performances". Another critic called the album "...perhaps the definitive musical evocation of loneliness". Jazz historian Scott Yanow described the album as "Sinatra often mourning lost love and sounding a bit desolate but ultimately hopeful." Writing for The New Yorker, Andy Friedman credits In the Wee Small Hours with changing the purpose of an LP from a mere collection of singles into an art form capable of high literature.

=== Accolades ===
Publication	Accolade	Year	Rank
Gear	The 100 Greatest Albums of the Century	1999	
Blender	The 100 Greatest American Albums of All Time	2002	54
Rolling Stone	The 500 Greatest Albums of All Time	2003	100
Rolling Stone	The 500 Greatest Albums of All Time	2012	101
Rolling Stone	The 500 Greatest Albums of All Time	2020	282
Rolling Stone	The 500 Greatest Albums of All Time	2023	282
1001 Albums You Must Hear Before You Die	1001 Albums You Must Hear Before You Die	2005	
Time	The All-TIME 100 Albums	2006	
Mojo	100 Records That Changed the World	2007	11
Platendraaier	Top 30 Albums of the 50s	2016	7

== Legacy ==
The album marked a turning point for Sinatra, the beginning of Sinatra's "mature" singing style, carrying with it both depth of emotive expression and willingness to experiment rhythmically. Sinatra's relationship with Gardner had previously largely been unaccepted by the general public. John Rockwell believes it was this album, because of the genuine emotional palette on display, that changed the perception of the "validity" of the ill-fated romance.

Charles Granata opines that this album of ballads best defines Sinatra and the era in which it was recorded. Based largely on Sinatra's reputation, this album helped change the "tough guy" image, allowing for a larger range of acceptable emotional responses from men, which might previously have been perceived as for wimps. Directly before Sinatra's funeral service, songs from "the Ava album" were played by a trio led by Bill Miller.

The title track, "In the Wee Small Hours of the Morning", has been recorded by a number of artists following Sinatra's version, including Johnny Hartman, Astrud Gilberto, Lou Rawls, Carly Simon, Art Blakey, Count Basie and His Orchestra, Andy Williams, Wes Montgomery, Ruby Braff, Jamie Cullum, John Mayer, Susan Wong, Curtis Stigers (on his 2009 album Lost in Dreams) and many others.

In his autobiography, B.B. King writes of how he was a "Sinatra nut" and went to bed every night listening to In the Wee Small Hours. In Marvin Gaye's biography Divided Soul, the album is cited as a favorite and an inspiration for his posthumously released "ballad" album Vulnerable along with Billie Holiday's Lady in Satin. Claus Ogerman considered In the Wee Small Hours to be "the pinnacle of everything in pop music." Elvis Costello included it on his list of essential albums, highlighting "Dancing on the Ceiling" and "When Your Lover Has Gone." Tom Waits placed it first on a list of favorite albums, calling it "Actually, the very first 'concept' album. The idea being you put this record on after dinner and by the last song you are exactly where you want to be. Sinatra said that he's certain most baby boomers were conceived with this as the soundtrack."

=== Cover artwork ===
In the Wee Small Hours' cover artwork has been subject to many interpretations and homages over the years.

Andy Williams' 1959 album Lonely Street features Williams posing for the cover art of his album in a similar fashion as Sinatra did for In the Wee Small Hours; the release also features a recording of Williams performing "In the Wee Small Hours of the Morning". Tom Waits has named In the Wee Small Hours one of his favourite albums. His second album, The Heart of Saturday Night, released in 1974, features a cover artwork painted by Lynn Lascaro that is based on In the Wee Small Hours'. When Harry Nilsson's 1973 album A Little Touch of Schmilsson in the Night was reissued in 1988, its title was updated to A Touch More Schmilsson in the Night and a new cover artwork was painted by Steve Russell, based on In the Wee Small Hours'.

The New Bomb Turks' 1993 split 7-inch vinyl with Sinister Six features a black and white photo manipulation of In the Wee Small Hours' original album artwork. Subsonics' 1993 album Good Violence features a new interpretation of In the Wee Small Hours' cover art, painted by band members Buffi Aguero and Ronald Skutt, but with Sinatra holding a syringe instead of a cigarette.

In the Wee Small Hours' album cover appears in the 2001 Cameron Crowe film Vanilla Sky during the final scene when Tom Cruise's character David Aames jumps off a building and sees his life flashing by. Kurt Elling's 2007 album Nightmoves' cover art features Elling posing for a photograph with the same pose as Sinatra did on In the Wee Small Hours; the release also features a recording of Elling performing "In the Wee Small Hours of the Morning". Ogham Waite and The Amphibian Jazz Band's 2011 live album Live at the Gilman House features a cover art painted by Darrell Tutchton that is based on In the Wee Small Hours'.

Canadian-American ambient rock band Vision Eternel also based the cover artwork of their 2020 concept extended play For Farewell of Nostalgia on In the Wee Small Hours', this one features an illustration by American painter Michael Koelsch. Willie Nelson's 2021 release That's Life has a cover art painted by Paul Mann that is again based on In the Wee Small Hours.

== Track listing ==
Side 1
No.	Title	Writer(s)	Length
1.	"In the Wee Small Hours of the Morning"	Bob Hilliard and David Mann	3:00
2.	"Mood Indigo"	Barney Bigard, Duke Ellington and Irving Mills	3:30
3.	"Glad to Be Unhappy"	Richard Rodgers and Lorenz Hart	2:35
4.	"I Get Along Without You Very Well"	Hoagy Carmichael	3:42
5.	"Deep in a Dream"	Eddie DeLange and Jimmy Van Heusen	2:49
6.	"I See Your Face Before Me"	Howard Dietz and Arthur Schwartz	3:24
7.	"Can't We Be Friends?"	Paul James and Kay Swift	2:48
8.	"When Your Lover Has Gone"	Einar Aaron Swan	3:10

Side 2
No.	Title	Writer(s)	Length
1.	"What Is This Thing Called Love?"	Cole Porter	2:35
2.	"Last Night When We Were Young"	Harold Arlen and Yip Harburg	3:17
3.	"I'll Be Around"	Alec Wilder	2:59
4.	"Ill Wind"	Harold Arlen and Ted Koehler	3:46
5.	"It Never Entered My Mind"	Richard Rodgers and Lorenz Hart	2:42
6.	"Dancing on the Ceiling"	Richard Rodgers and Lorenz Hart	2:57
7.	"I'll Never Be the Same"	Gus Kahn, Matty Malneck and Frank Signorelli	3:05
8.	"This Love of Mine"	Sol Parker, Henry W. Sanicola, Jr. and Frank Sinatra	3:33

2007 re-release bonus tracks
No.	Title	Writing	Length
17.	"Three Coins in the Fountain"	Jule Styne and Sammy Cahn	3:08
18.	"Young at Heart"	Johnny Richards and Carolyn Leigh	2:55

== Complete personnel ==
- Frank Sinatra – vocals
- Nelson Riddle – arranger, conductor
- Voyle Gilmore – producer
- John Palladino – audio engineer

Tracks	Recording	Personnel
Tracks 1, 4, 8, 16:	February 17, 1955 – Capitol recording session KHJ Studios 8–11:30 p.m.	Felix Slatkin, Paul Shure, Harry Bluestone, Mischa Russell, Erno Neufeld, Marshall Sosson, Alex Beller, Victor Bay, Walter Edelstein, Henry Hill, Nathan Ross, David Frisina (vln); Alvin Dinkin, Paul Robyn, David Sterkin, Stanley Harris (via); Eleanor Slatkin, Kurt Reher, Edgar Lustgarten, Ray Kramer (vlc); Kathryn Julye (harp); Bill Miller (p), George Van Eps (g); Mike Rubin, Morty Corb (b); Lou Singer (d); Nelson Riddle (arr/cond).
Tracks 2, 6, 9, 12:	(February 16, 1955 – Capitol recording session KHJ Studios 8–11:30 p.m.)	Harry Edison (tpt); Mahlon Clark, Skeets Herfurt, Champ Webb, Babe Russin, Ted Nash (sax/wwd); Felix Slatkin, Paul Shure, Harry Bluestone, Mischa Russell (vln); Alvin Dinkin, Eleanor Slatkin (via); Kathryn Julye (hp); Bill Miller (p); Paul Smith (vlc); George Van Eps (g); Phil Stephens (b); Alvin Stoller (d); Nelson Riddle (arr/cond).
Tracks 3, 7, 11, 14	(February 8, 1955 – Capitol recording session KHJ Studios 8:30 p.m. – 12 m.)	Frank Sinatra with Rhythm Section Conducted by Bill Miler Bill Miller (p); Paul Smith (vlc); George Van Eps (g); Phil Stephens (b); Alvin Stoller (d); Nelson Riddle (arr).
Tracks 5, 13, 15:	(March 4, 1955 – Capitol recording session KHJ Studios)	John Cave, Vincent DeRosa, Joseph Eger, Richard Perissi (fr-h); Arthur Gleghorn, Louella Howard, Jules Kinsler, George Poole (fl); Felix Slatkin, Paul Shure, Harry Bluestone, Mischa Russell, Marshall Sosson, Nathan Ross, Victor Bay, Alex Beller (vln); Eleanor Slatkin, Cy Bernard, Edgar Lustgarten, Armand Kaproff, Ray Kramer, Joseph Saxon, Kurt Reher, James Arkatov (vlc); Kathryn Julye (harp); Bill Miller (p); George Van Eps (g); Phil Stephens (b); Lou Singer (d); Nelson Riddle (arr/cond).
Track 10:	(March 1, 1954 – Capitol recording session KHJ Studios 8 p.m. – 12 m)	Joe Howard, Tommy Pederson (tbn); John Graas, John Cave (fr-h); Harry Klee, James Williamson, Champ Webb, Mahlon Clark, Mort Friedman, Bart Caldarell (sax/wwd); Alex Beller, Victor Bay, Walter Edelstein, Nathan Ross, Felix Slatkin, Paul Shure, Mischa Russell, Harry Bluestone, Eudice Shapiro, Paul Nero, George Kast (vln); Paul Robyn, Maxine Johnson, Stanley Harris (via); Cy Bernard, Eleanor Slatkin, Edgar Lustgarten (vlc); Kathryn Julye, Ann Mason Stockton (harp); Bill Miller (p); Bobby Gibbons (g); Joe Comfort, Eddie Gilbert (b); Frank Carlson (d); Nelson Riddle (arr/cond).

== Charts ==
=== Weekly charts ===
Chart performance for In the Wee Small Hours
Chart (2025)	Peak position
Croatian International Albums (HDU)	19

Chart (2026)	Peak position
Swedish Jazz Albums (Sverigetopplistan)	19

=== Monthly charts ===
Chart (2025)	Peak position
German Jazz Albums (Offizielle Top 100)	4

== Certifications ==
Region	Certification	Certified units/sales
United Kingdom (BPI)	Silver	60,000^{‡}
United States (RIAA)	Gold	500,000^{^}
^{^} Shipments figures based on certification alone.^{‡} Sales+streaming figures based on certification alone.

== See also ==
- Album era
- List of songs introduced by Frank Sinatra
