= The Capitol Years (1990 Frank Sinatra album) =

Compilation album by Frank Sinatra
- Released: December 13, 1990
- Recorded: April 2, 1953–March 6, 1962
- Genre: Traditional pop
- Length: 224:06
- Label: Capitol

Frank Sinatra chronology
The Reprise Collection (1990)	The Capitol Years (1990)	Sinatra Reprise: The Very Good Years (1991)

Professional ratings
Review scores
Source	Rating
AllMusic	4.5/5 stars

The Capitol Years is a 1990 compilation album of the U.S. singer Frank Sinatra. Released to coincide with Sinatra's 75th birthday, this three-disc set has an abundance of classic Sinatra performances from his career with Capitol Records, which spanned the years 1953 to 1961.

A single disc version called The Best of the Capitol Years was released in 1992.

== Track listing ==
=== Disc one ===
1. "I've Got the World on a String" (Harold Arlen, Ted Koehler) - 2:10
  Recorded on April 30, 1953
2. "Lean Baby" (Roy Alfred, Billy May) - 2:33
  Recorded on April 2, 1953
3. "I Love You" (Harry Archer, Harlan Thompson) - 2:27
4. "South of the Border" (Jimmy Kennedy, Michael Carr) – 2:50
  Recorded on April 30, 1953
5. "From Here to Eternity" (Freddie Karger, Robert Wells) - 2:59
  Recorded on May 2, 1953
6. "They Can't Take That Away from Me" (George Gershwin, Ira Gershwin) - 1:57
  Recorded on November 5, 1953
7. "I Get a Kick Out of You" (Cole Porter) - 2:53
  Recorded on November 6, 1953
8. "Young at Heart" (Carolyn Leigh, Johnny Richards) - 2:59
  Recorded on December 9, 1953
9. "Three Coins in the Fountain" (Jule Styne, Sammy Cahn) - 3:04
  Recorded on March 1, 1954
10. "All of Me" (Gerald Marks, Seymour Simons) - 2:07
11. "Taking a Chance on Love" (Vernon Duke, Ted Fetter, John Latouche) - 2:19
  Recorded on April 19, 1954
12. "Someone to Watch Over Me" (G. Gershwin, I. Gershwin) - 2:56
  Recorded on September 23, 1954
13. "What Is This Thing Called Love?" (Porter) - 2:35
  Recorded on February 16, 1955
14. "In the Wee Small Hours of the Morning" (Bob Hilliard, David Mann) - 2:59
  Recorded on February 17, 1954
15. "Learnin' the Blues" (Delores Vicki Silvers) - 3:00
  Recorded on March 23, 1955
16. "Our Town" (Cahn, Jimmy Van Heusen) - 3:15
17. "Love and Marriage" (Cahn, Van Heusen) - 2:38
  Recorded on August 15, 1955
18. "(Love Is) The Tender Trap" (Cahn, Van Heusen) - 2:57
  Recorded on September 13, 1955
19. "Weep They Will" (Bill Carey, Carey Fischer) - 3:16
  Recorded on October 17, 1955
20. "I Thought About You" (Van Heusen, Johnny Mercer) – 2:30
21. "You Make Me Feel So Young" (Josef Myrow, Mack Gordon) – 2:57
22. "Memories of You" (Andy Razaf, Eubie Blake) - 2:53
  Recorded on January 9, 1956
23. "I've Got You Under My Skin" (Porter) - 3:43
  Recorded on January 12, 1956
24. "Too Marvelous for Words" (Mercer, Richard A. Whiting) - 2:27
  Recorded on January 16, 1956
25. "Don't Like Goodbyes" (Harold Arlen, Truman Capote) - 4:50
  Recorded on March 8, 1956
26. "(How Little It Matters) How Little We Know" (Leigh, Philip Springer) - 2:39
  Recorded on April 5, 1956

=== Disc two ===
1. "Hey! Jealous Lover" (Sammy Cahn, Kay Twomey, Bee Walker) - 2:21
  Recorded on April 9, 1956
2. "You're Sensational" (Porter) - 2:16
  Recorded on April 5, 1956
3. "Close to You" (Al Hoffman, Carl G. Lampl, Jerry Livingston) - 3:56
  Recorded on November 1, 1956
4. "Stars Fell on Alabama" (Mitchell Parish, Frank Perkins) - 2:35
5. "I Got Plenty Of Nothing" (G. Gershwin, I. Gershwin, Dubose Heyward) - 3:14
  Recorded on November 15, 1956
6. "I Wish I Were in Love Again" (Richard Rodgers, Lorenz Hart) - 2:28
  Recorded on November 20, 1956
7. "The Lady Is a Tramp" (Rodgers, Hart) - 3:14
8. "Night and Day" (Porter) - 3:59
9. "The Lonesome Road" (Gene Austin, Nat Shilkret) - 3:53
10. "If I Had You" (Jimmy Campbell, Reginald Connelly, Ted Shapiro) - 2:35
  Recorded on November 26, 1956
11. "Where Are You?" (Harold Adamson, Jimmy McHugh) – 3:30
12. "I'm a Fool to Want You" (Frank Sinatra, Jack Wolf, Joel Herron) – 4:51
  Recorded on May 1, 1957
13. "Witchcraft" (Cy Coleman, Carolyn Leigh) - 2:52
14. "Something Wonderful Happens in Summer" (Joe Bushkin, John DeVries) - 3:12
  Recorded on May 20, 1957
15. "All the Way" (Cahn, Van Heusen) - 2:52
16. "Chicago (That Toddlin' Town)" (Fred Fisher) - 2:12
  Recorded on August 13, 1957
17. "Let's Get Away from It All" (Matt Dennis, Tom Adair) – 2:11
  Recorded on October 1, 1957
18. "Autumn in New York" (Vernon Duke) – 4:37
  Recorded on October 3, 1957
19. "Come Fly with Me" (Cahn, Van Heusen) – 3:19
  Recorded on October 8, 1957
20. "Everybody Loves Somebody" (Sam Coslow, Ken Lane, Irving Taylor) - 3:42
21. "It's the Same Old Dream" (Cahn, Styne) - 3:02
  Recorded on November 25, 1957
22. "Put Your Dreams Away (For Another Day)" (Ruth Lowe, Paul Mann, George David Weiss) - 3:12
  Recorded on December 11, 1957
23. "Here Goes" (Otto Cesana, Cahn) - 2:42
  Recorded on March 3, 1958
24. "Angel Eyes" (Earl Brent, Matt Dennis) - 3:44
  Recorded on May 29, 1958

=== Disc three ===
1. "Ebb Tide" (Robert Maxwell, Carl Sigman) - 3:18
2. "Guess I'll Hang My Tears Out to Dry" (Cahn, Styne) - 3:59
3. "Only the Lonely" (Cahn, Van Heusen) - 4:31
  Recorded on May 29, 1958
4. "One For My Baby (And One More For The Road)" (Arlen, Mercer) - 4:04
  Recorded on June 26, 1958
5. "To Love and Be Loved" (Cahn, Van Heusen) - 2:56
6. "I Couldn't Care Less" (Cahn, Van Heusen) - 2:58
  Recorded on October 15, 1958
7. "The Song Is You" (Oscar Hammerstein II, Jerome Kern) - 2:42
8. "Just In Time" (Betty Comden, Adolph Green, Styne) - 2:23
  Recorded on December 9, 1958
9. "Saturday Night (Is the Loneliest Night of the Week)" (Cahn, Styne) - 1:54
  Recorded on December 22, 1958
10. "Come Dance With Me" (Cahn, Van Heusen) - 2:59
  Recorded on December 23, 1958
11. "French Foreign Legion" (Aaron Schroeder, Guy Wood) - 2:01
  Recorded on December 29, 1958
12. "The One I Love (Belongs to Somebody Else)" (Isham Jones, Gus Kahn) - 3:03
13. "Here's That Rainy Day" (Johnny Burke, Van Heusen) - 4:19
  Recorded on March 25, 1959
14. "High Hopes" (Cahn, Van Heusen) - 2:42
  Recorded on May 8, 1959
15. "When No One Cares" (Cahn, Van Heusen) - 2:42
16. "I'll Never Smile Again" (Ruth Lowe) - 3:43
  Recorded on May 14, 1959
17. "I've Got a Crush on You" (G. Gershwin, I. Gershwin) - 2:16
18. "Embraceable You" (G. Gershwin, I. Gershwin) - 3:23
  Recorded on March 3, 1960
19. "Nice 'N' Easy" (Alan Bergman, Marilyn Keith, Lew Spence) - 2:45
  Recorded on April 13, 1960
20. "I Can't Believe That You're In Love With Me" (Clarence Gaskill, McHugh) - 2:25
  Recorded on August 23, 1960
21. "On the Sunny Side of the Street" (Dorothy Fields, McHugh) - 2:41
  Recorded on March 20, 1961
22. "I've Heard That Song Before" (Cahn, Styne) - 2:30
  Recorded on March 21, 1961
23. "Almost Like Being In Love" (Alan Jay Lerner, Frederick Loewe) - 2:02
  Recorded on March 22, 1961
24. "I'll Be Seeing You" (Sammy Fain, Irving Kahal) - 2:46
  Recorded on September 11, 1961
25. "I Gotta Right to Sing the Blues" (Arlen, Koehler) - 2:58
  Recorded on March 6, 1962

== Personnel ==
- Frank Sinatra – vocals
- Gordon Jenkins – arranger, conductor
- Skip Martin – arranger
- Billy May – arranger, conductor
- Nelson Riddle – arranger, conductor
- Felix Slatkin – conductor
- Axel Stordahl – conductor
- Heinie Beau – arranger
- Ron Furmanek – box set compiler and producer

== Charts ==
Chart performance for The Capitol Years
Chart (1991)	Peak position
Australian Albums (ARIA)	79
US Billboard 200	126
