= Jack Sharpe (songwriter) =

American songwriter and music publishing executive

John Rufus Sharpe III (October 31, 1909 – April 23, 1996) was an American songwriter, music publishing executive and author. He is best known for "So Rare", published in 1937, which he wrote with composer Jerry Herst.

Sharpe was born in Berkeley, California, United States, the first of two children of John Rufus Sharpe Jr. and Regina Franvell Walshe. Although his father was not known to be musically inclined, that was not the case with his mother. She achieved some local renown for her operatic singing and she passed her love of music to her son. Sharpe was distantly related to the singer and entertainer Judy Canova.

"So Rare" was a #2 hit in 1957 for Jimmy Dorsey, but it has been recorded by numerous artists including Carl Ravell and his Orchestra (1937), Gus Arnheim and his Coconut Grove Orchestra (1937), Guy Lombardo and his Royal Canadians (1937), Andy Williams (1959), Ella Fitzgerald (1960) and Ray Conniff (1965). Sharpe and Herst have four collaborations listed at the performing rights organisation ASCAP, including "So Rare", and a number of other Herst-Sharpe songs are listed at the US Copyright Office.

Sharpe wrote the lyrics to "The Dream Peddler's Serenade" (1950), composed by Johnny Mercer and recorded by Margaret Whiting.

He authored at least one novel, Hogar, Lord of the Asyr (1987), published in New American Library's Signet imprint under his full name of John Rufus Sharpe III.

In the mid-1960s, Sharpe formed Rondo Music, and by 1967 he was General Manager of the George E. Primrose Music Co, Mill Valley, California. In 1970 he married Josephine Tumminia, an opera singer who had recorded with the Jimmy Dorsey Orchestra in 1937. At the time of his death he had last resided in San Mateo, California, but he died in Santa Cruz County.
