= I'm Thru with Love =

Song by Gus Kahn, Matty Malneck and Fud Livingston

"I'm Thru with Love" or "I'm Through with Love" is a jazz standard, written by Gus Kahn, Matty Malneck, Fud Livingston. It was first recorded in 1931 by Henry Busse and His Orchestra, with a vocal refrain by Richard Barry. It was recorded the same year by Bing Crosby, Lee Morse and Her Blue Grass Boys and Gene Austin. Dinah Shore first recorded it in July 1941, with an orchestra conducted by Lou Bring, and 10 years later with Henri René's orchestra in 1951. Sarah Vaughan recorded it in July 1947 with George Treadwell's Orchestra. Bobby Van performed it in the 1953 musical comedy film "The Affairs of Dobie Gillis". Carmen McRae recorded the tune for her 1957 album After Glow. Ella Fitzgerald recorded it on 25 March 1959 for her album Hello Love. It was sung by actress Marilyn Monroe in the 1959 movie Some Like it Hot. Diahann Carroll performed the song in the 1984 Dynasty episode "The Nightmare", in the 1995 Woody Allen film Everyone Says I Love You and Kirsten Dunst as Mary Jane performed it in Spider-Man 3 (2007). It was also famously sung by Carl "Alfalfa" Switzer in the Our Gang short "Reunion in Rhythm".
