= Capitol Collectors Series (Frank Sinatra album) =

Compilation album by Frank Sinatra
- Released: July 26, 1989
- Recorded: April 30, 1953 – March 1960
- Genre: Traditional pop, vocal jazz
- Length: 56:10
- Label: Capitol

Frank Sinatra chronology
All-Time Greatest Dorsey/Sinatra Hits, Vol. 1-4 (1988)	Capitol Collectors Series (1989)	The Reprise Collection (1990)

Professional ratings
Review scores
Source	Rating
AllMusic	4.5/5 stars

Capitol Collectors Series is a 1989 compilation album by American singer Frank Sinatra.

== Track listing ==
CD
No.	Title	Writer(s)	Length
1.	"I'm Walking Behind You"	Billy Reid	2:57
2.	"I've Got the World on a String"	Harold Arlen, Ted Koehler	2:10
3.	"From Here to Eternity"	Freddy Karger, Robert Wells	2:59
4.	"South of the Border"	Jimmy Kennedy, Michael Carr	2:47
5.	"Young at Heart"	Johnny Richards, Carolyn Leigh	2:50
6.	"Don't Worry 'bout Me"	Rube Bloom, Koehler	3:08
7.	"Three Coins in the Fountain"	Jule Styne, Sammy Cahn	3:03
8.	"Melody of Love (with Ray Anthony)"	Hans Engelmann, Tom Glazer	3:05
9.	"Learnin' the Blues"	Dolores Vicki Silvers	3:00
10.	"Same Old Saturday Night"	Frank Reardon, Cahn	2:28
11.	"Love and Marriage"	Cahn, Jimmy Van Heusen	2:37
12.	"(Love Is) The Tender Trap"	Cahn, Van Heusen	2:57
13.	"(How Little It Matters) How Little We Know"	Phillip Springer, Leigh	3:22
14.	"Hey Jealous Lover"	Cahn, Kay Twomey, Bee Walker	2:41
15.	"Can I Steal a Little Love?"	Phil Tuminello	2:31
16.	"All the Way"	Cahn, Van Heusen	2:54
17.	"Chicago (That Toddlin' Town)"	Fred Fisher	2:10
18.	"Witchcraft"	Cy Coleman, Leigh	2:53
19.	"High Hopes"	Cahn, Van Heusen	2:50
20.	"Nice 'n' Easy"	Alan Bergman, Marilyn Bergman, Lew Spence	2:47
Total length:			56:09
