= Stephen Holden =

American writer and critic (born 1941)

- Born: July 18, 1941 (age 85); United States
- Education: Yale University
- Occupations: Writer; critic; poet
- Awards: Grammy Award for Best Album Notes

Stephen Holden (born July 18, 1941) is an American writer, poet, and music and film critic.

== Biography ==
Holden earned a Bachelor of Arts degree in English from Yale University in 1963. He worked as a photo editor and staff writer. Eventually, he became an A&R executive for RCA Records before turning to writing pop music reviews and related articles for Rolling Stone magazine, Blender, The Village Voice, The Atlantic, and Vanity Fair, among other publications. He first achieved prominence with his 1970s Rolling Stone work, during which he tended to cover singer-songwriters and traditional pop artists. He joined the staff of The New York Times in 1981 and subsequently became one of the newspaper's leading theatre and film critics.

Holden's experiences as a journalist and executive at RCA led him to write the satirical novel Triple Platinum, published by Dell Books in 1980. He is the recipient of the 1986 Grammy Award for Best Album Notes for the liner notes he wrote for The Voice: The Columbia Years, a Frank Sinatra anthology. His poetry has been featured in The New Yorker and is included in the anthology The New Yorker Book of Poems.

In the mid-1990s, Holden became a second-string film critic, moving to first-string by 2000.

Holden has appeared on 60 Minutes, 20/20, and Entertainment Tonight, and has provided commentaries on National Public Radio.

== See also ==
- New Yorkers in journalism
