= Sinatra Reprise: The Very Good Years =

Compilation album by Frank Sinatra
- Released: March 26, 1991
- Recorded: December 21, 1960–September 19, 1979
- Genre: Traditional pop
- Length: 66:54
- Label: Reprise

Frank Sinatra chronology
The Capitol Years (1990)	Sinatra Reprise: The Very Good Years (1991)	Sinatra Sings the Songs of Van Heusen & Cahn (1991)

Professional ratings
Review scores
Source	Rating
Allmusic	5/5 stars

Sinatra Reprise: The Very Good Years is a 1991 single disc compilation taken from the four disc box set The Reprise Collection, a 1990 box set by the American singer Frank Sinatra. For many years, this was the only collection of Sinatra's Reprise work on one disc until 2008's collection Nothing But The Best. The Very Good Years reached #98 on the Billboard Top 200 album charts in 1991.

== Track listing ==
1. "The Last Dance" (Sammy Cahn, Jimmy Van Heusen) – 2:46
2. "Night and Day" (Cole Porter) – 3:37
3. "I Get a Kick Out of You" (Porter) – 3:14
4. "Luck Be a Lady" (Frank Loesser) – 5:14
5. "The Way You Look Tonight" (Jerome Kern, Dorothy Fields) – 3:22
6. "My Kind of Town" (Cahn, Van Heusen) – 3:08
7. "The Best Is Yet to Come" (Cy Coleman, Carolyn Leigh) – 2:54
8. "Fly Me To The Moon (In Other Words)" (Bart Howard) – 2:49
9. "It Was a Very Good Year" (Ervin Drake) – 4:27
10. "Love and Marriage" (Cahn, Van Heusen) – 2:12
11. "I've Got You Under My Skin" (live at the Sands Hotel, 1966) (Porter) – 3:43
12. "Strangers in the Night" (Bert Kaempfert, Charles Singleton, Eddie Snyder) – 2:25
13. "Summer Wind" (Heinz Meyer, Hans Bradtke, Johnny Mercer) – 2:53
14. "All or Nothing at All" (Arthur Altman, Jack Lawrence) – 3:57
15. "That's Life" (Kelly Gordon, Dean Kay) – 3:10
16. "My Way" (Paul Anka, Claude François, Jacques Revaux, Gilles Thibault) – 4:35
17. "The Lady Is a Tramp" (live at Madison Square Garden, October 13, 1974) (Rodgers, Hart) – 2:56
18. "Send in the Clowns" (Stephen Sondheim) – 3:36
19. "Nancy (With the Laughing Face)" (Phil Silvers, Van Heusen) – 2:28
20. "Theme from New York, New York" (Fred Ebb, John Kander) – 3:26

== Personnel ==
- Frank Sinatra - vocals
- Nelson Riddle - arranger, conductor
- Don Costa
- Gordon Jenkins
- Billy May
- Ernie Freeman
- Quincy Jones
- Neal Hefti
- Bill Miller - pianist, conductor
- Count Basie and his Orchestra
- Woody Herman and his Orchestra
