= I'm Gonna Sit Right Down and Write Myself a Letter =

1935 song by Fred E. Ahlert and Joe Young

Single by Fats Waller & His Rhythm
- B-side: "You've Been Taking Lessons in Love"
- Released: May 29, 1935
- Recorded: May 8, 1935
- Studio: Victor Studios, New York
- Genre: popular
- Length: 3:33
- Label: Victor
- Composer: Fred E. Ahlert
- Lyricist: Joe Young

Fats Waller & His Rhythm singles chronology
"You're So Darn Charming" (1935)	"I'm Gonna Sit Right Down and Write Myself a Letter" (1935)	"Thief in the Night" (1935)

"I'm Gonna Sit Right Down and Write Myself a Letter" is a 1935 popular song with music by Fred E. Ahlert and lyrics by Joe Young. It has been recorded many times, and has become a standard of the Great American Songbook. It was popularized by Fats Waller, who recorded it in 1935 at the height of his fame.

It is one of several songs from the Harlem Renaissance featured in the Broadway musical Ain't Misbehavin'. The lyrics are addressed to a lover and say that the singer is going to write a letter and pretend that it is a love letter from the lover.

American Public Media's business-news program, Marketplace, uses a portion of Fats Waller's version to open its weekly letters-from-listeners segment.

== Recordings ==
The song had a major revival in 1957 in a Coral recording (on April 3) by Billy Williams with orchestra directed by Dick Jacobs. It reached No. 3 on the Billboard magazine charts. A reported million-seller, it was awarded a gold record. This version is included on the soundtrack of 1998 film You've Got Mail.

The song was recorded by Frank Sinatra for his 1954 album Swing Easy; by Bing Crosby for his 1957 LP Bing with a Beat; and again by Sinatra in 1962 for his collaborative album with Count Basie, Sinatra–Basie: An Historic Musical First.

Among other versions are recordings by The Boswell Sisters, Connee Boswell, Nat King Cole, Scatman Crothers, Gregory Isaacs, Barry Manilow, Dean Martin, Anne Murray, Willie Nelson, Linda Scott, Shakin' Stevens, Al Bowlly, Sarah Vaughan, Ella Mae Morse, and The Mills Brothers.

Don Cherry, best known for "Band of Gold", his 1955 mega hit, released a version of 'Letter' in 1957 on a Coronet 78 (an Australian label), working with Ray Conniff and his Orchestra. On the flip side was So Rare.

Charlie Gracie (mostly known for his 1957 No. 1 hit "Butterfly" on Cameo Record label #105—45rpm) recorded "I'm Gonna Sit Right Down and Write Myself a Letter" (Cadillac Record label #141—45 rpm). The flip side of the record was a song written by Gracie, "Boogie Woogie Blues". Gracie's version was released in 1953.

Bill Haley & His Comets recorded a rock and roll version of the song in 1957.

Fabian recorded his version of the song in 1960 on Chancellor Records.

In 1973 Cleo Laine included the song as her opening song on the album I Am a Song and sang on stage during her subsequent tour.

Comedian Larry Storch recorded and released the song on Roulette records.

New Jersey entertainer Uncle Floyd (aka Floyd Vivino) has covered this song in his live performances as well as recording it.

Madeleine Peyroux also covered this song on her debut album Dreamland (1996).

Tony Danza released a version in 2002.

In 2012 Paul McCartney covered it on his album of standards, Kisses on the Bottom and chose one of its lines as the title.
