= Violets for Your Furs =

Song by Matt Dennis and Tom Adair

"Violets for your Furs"

Single by Tommy Dorsey and His Orchestra (vocal refrain by Frank Sinatra)
- B-side: "Somebody Loves Me"
- Released: November 1941
- Label: Victor
- Songwriters: Tom Adair and Matt Dennis

"Violets for Your Furs" is a 1941 song written by Matt Dennis with words by Tom Adair, and first recorded in that year by Tommy Dorsey's orchestra with vocals by Frank Sinatra. The song describes the wearing of violets with furs on an evening in Manhattan. Note: A friend's father told her that he wrote the song, "Violets for her furs" while living in Manhattan for his bride-to-be, Sophia. His name was Robert Proctor. The song is said to be about Lana Turner, who was involved with Sinatra at the time. Turner often wore flowers pinned to her furs.

== Selected recordings ==
- Frank Sinatra — Songs for Young Lovers (1954)
- Beverly Kenney — Come Swing with Me (1956)
- John Coltrane — Coltrane (1957)
- Jutta Hipp — Jutta Hipp with Zoot Sims (1957)
- Billie Holiday — Lady in Satin (1958)
- Chet Baker — Chet Baker with Fifty Italian Strings (1959)
- J.R. Monterose — The Message (1959)
