= Sinatra Sings the Songs of Van Heusen & Cahn =

Compilation album by Frank Sinatra
- Released: November 12, 1991
- Recorded: December 19, 1960 – November 11, 1968
- Genre: Traditional pop
- Length: 53:29
- Label: Reprise

Frank Sinatra chronology
| Sinatra Reprise: The Very Good Years (1991) | Sinatra Sings the Songs of Van Heusen & Cahn (1991) | Sinatra: Soundtrack To The CBS Mini-Series (1992) |

Professional ratings
Review scores
| Source | Rating |
|---|---|
| Allmusic | 2.5/5 stars |

Sinatra Sings the Songs of Van Heusen & Cahn is a 1991 compilation album by Frank Sinatra. It comprises his renditions of songs, written by Jimmy Van Heusen and Sammy Cahn.

== Track listing ==
1. "Ring-a-Ding Ding!" (Jimmy Van Heusen, Sammy Cahn)
2. "The Last Dance" (Van Heusen, Cahn)
3. "Imagination" (Van Heusen, Johnny Burke)
4. "Polka Dots and Moonbeams" (Van Heusen, Burke)
5. "It's Always You" (Van Heusen, Burke)
6. "Indiscreet" (Van Heusen, Cahn)
7. "Come Waltz with Me" (Van Heusen, Cahn)
8. "The Look of Love" (Van Heusen, Cahn)
9. "(Love Is) The Tender Trap" (Van Heusen, Cahn)
10. "Come Blow Your Horn" (Van Heusen, Cahn)
11. "Call Me Irresponsible" (Van Heusen, Cahn)
12. "All the Way" (Van Heusen, Cahn)
13. "Swinging on a Star" (Van Heusen, Burke)
14. "My Kind of Town" (Van Heusen, Cahn)
15. "I Like to Lead When I Dance" (Van Heusen, Cahn)
16. "The September of My Years" (Van Heusen, Cahn)
17. "I'll Only Miss Her When I Think of Her" (Van Heusen, Cahn)
18. "Come Fly with Me" (Van Heusen, Cahn)
19. "Love and Marriage" (Van Heusen, Cahn)
20. "Moonlight Becomes You" (Van Heusen, Burke)
21. "Oh, You Crazy Moon" (Van Heusen, Burke)
22. "Star!" (Van Heusen, Cahn)

Tracks 1–2, 6–12, 14-19 and 22 written by Jimmy Van Heusen & Sammy Cahn.

Tracks 3–4, 13, 20 and 21 written by Jimmy Van Heusen & Johnny Burke.
