= Wrap Your Troubles in Dreams (song) =

1931 popular song by Harry Barris

"Wrap Your Troubles in Dreams", also known as "Wrap Your Troubles in Dreams (and Dream Your Troubles Away)", is a popular song written by Harry Barris with lyrics by Ted Koehler and Billy Moll, published in 1931.

The original 1931 popular hit recording was made by Bing Crosby with the Gus Arnheim Orchestra on March 2, 1931 for Victor Records, but the song has become a standard, recorded by many other artists since. Bing Crosby recorded the song four times over his career as well as performing its film debut in the Mack Sennett short, One More Chance (1931). An outtake from one of the sessions, recorded on June 9, 1939, was preserved by blooper compiler Kermit Schafer in which Bing has his most famous "blowup" when he continues singing ad-lib and occasionally risqué words perfectly in tune.

“Life’s really funny that way.
Sang the wrong melody
We’ll play it back
See what it sounds like, hey-hey.
“They cut out eight bars,
the dirty bastards.
I didn’t know which eight bars,
he was gonna cut.
Why don’t somebody tell me
these things around here?
Holy Christ, I’m going off my nut.”

That outtake was presented in the PBS American Masters episode Bing Crosby Rediscovered.

Imogene Coca performed this song in an episode of Your Show of Shows while dressed as a hobo; the audience reaction was so favorable that she encored her version in the last episode of the variety series, making this the only song she performed in two different episodes of Your Show of Shows.

== Other notable recordings ==
- 1931: Louis Armstrong - recorded November 4, 1931 for Okeh Records, catalog No. 41530.
- 1931: Mildred Bailey - recorded September 15, 1931 for Brunswick Records (6184).
- 1942: Erskine Hawkins and His Orchestra (vocal by Jimmy Mitchelle) - reached the No. 23 position in the Billboard charts in 1942.
- 1946: Georgia Gibbs
- 1947: Frankie Laine. He also sang it in the film Rainbow 'Round My Shoulder (1952).
- 1954: Frank Sinatra for his album Swing Easy!
- 1958: Dean Martin for his Sleep Warm album.
- 1960: Sue Raney in her Songs for a Raney Day album.
- 1961: Sarah Vaughan - for her album The Divine One.
- 1963: Bill Evans, for his album Interplay.
- 1964: Tony Bennett included in his album Who Can I Turn To.
- 1974: Barbra Streisand included in the soundtrack The Way We Were: Original Soundtrack Recording.
- 1982: Alberta Hunter in The Glory of Alberta Hunter
- 2002: June Christy on Cool Christy (2002)
