= Fud Livingston =

American jazz musician

Joseph Anthony "Fud" Livingston (April 10, 1906 – March 25, 1957) was an American jazz clarinetist, saxophonist, arranger, and composer.

== Career ==
In the 1920s, he performed with Ben Pollack and served as his arranger (to summer 1925, and again summer 1926 – autumn 1927), with the California Ramblers (autumn 1925), Jean Goldkette (from late 1925), and played on the 1928 Brunswick recording of "Room 1411" as a member of Benny Goodman's group Benny Goodman's Boys, which also featured Glenn Miller, Jimmy McPartland, Bud Freeman, and Pollack.

He worked with Fred Elizalde in London in 1929, then returned to New York City to record with the Frank Trumbauer Orchestra for OKeh Record Co. on July 22, 1930 and later that same week with Paul Whiteman and his Orchestra on Columbia Phonograph Co., adding alto sax to the tenor sax and clarinet he had played on the previous session.

Livingston replaced Trumbauer for a second stint in Whiteman's orchestra (August 1932–September 1933), which included numerous recordings for the Victor Talking Machine Co., with recording session notes from that period showing Livingston as arranger as well as playing tenor sax and clarinet, featuring on several solos.

Later in the 1930s he worked with Benny Goodman (1934), Jimmy Dorsey (1935–37), Bob Zurke, and Pinky Tomlin (1940). He essentially stopped writing and arranging at this point, though he occasionally performed in small-time venues in New York in the 1950s. He never recorded as a leader.

== Compositions ==
His compositions included "Feelin' No Pain" (1927), recorded by Red Nichols and Lud Gluskin, "Imagination", "Humpty Dumpty", recorded by Frankie Trumbauer with Bix Beiderbecke, "Harlem Twist" with Chauncey Morehouse, "Sax Appeal", recorded by B.A. Rolfe, and the jazz standard "I'm Thru with Love" (1931), co-written with Matty Malneck and Gus Kahn.
