= Anson Weeks =

American pianist (1896–1969)

Anson Weeks (February 14, 1896, Oakland, California – February 7, 1969, Sacramento, California) was an American pianist and the leader of a popular west coast dance band from the late 1920s through the 1960s, primarily in San Francisco. He made his first recording in Oakland on February 7, 1925, but it was not issued.

He formed his first band in 1924 and had key hotel jobs in Oakland and Sacramento. By the late 1920s he led a popular regional orchestra and started recording for Columbia in 1928. He garnerered favorable attention in late 1931 on the "Lucky Strike Magic Carpet" radio program. His vocalists included Art Wilson, Harriet Lee, Donald Novis, Bob Crosby, Carl Ravazza, Kay St. Germaine, and Bob Gage. In 1932, he signed with Brunswick and recorded prolifically for them through 1935. During this time, his was one of Brunswick's premier bands and was nationally popular. He later did a session for Decca in 1937.

Weeks was involved in an auto accident in 1941 and was out of the band business for several years, starting up again in the late 1940s. He signed with the local Fantasy label in the early 1950s and did a series of dance albums (Dancin' With Anson) that were quite popular regionally (and were still in the catalog through the 1970s).

His songs include "I'm Writing You This Little Melody" (theme song), "I'm Sorry Dear", "Senorita", "That Same Old Dream", and "We'll Get A Bang Out Of Life".

== Death ==
He died in Sacramento, California, in 1969, one week before his 73rd birthday.

== Bibliography ==
- American Dance Bands on Record and Film (1915-1942), first edition, Compiled by Richard J. Johnson & Bernard H. Shirley, Rustbooks, 2009
