= Swing Easy! =

- 12" LP

Studio album by Frank Sinatra
- Released: August 2, 1954
- Recorded: April 7, April 19, 1954
- Studios: Capitol, 5515 Melrose Ave, Hollywood
- Genres: Vocal jazz; traditional pop
- Length: 19:17
- Label: Capitol
- Producer: Voyle Gilmore

Frank Sinatra chronology
Songs for Young Lovers (1954)	Swing Easy! (1954)	In the Wee Small Hours (1955)

Professional ratings
Review scores
Source	Rating
Allmusic	4.5/5 stars
Encyclopedia of Popular Music	5/5 stars
Uncut	4/5 stars

Swing Easy! is the eighth studio album by Frank Sinatra. It was released in 1954 as a 10" album (Capitol H-528) and consisted of only eight songs, as each side of the record only allowed approximately fourteen minutes of music.

In 2000 it was voted number 368 in Colin Larkin's All Time Top 1000 Albums.

== Background ==
The album was Sinatra's second for Capitol and the first to feature arrangements by Nelson Riddle (Riddle had merely conducted on Songs for Young Lovers). As its title implies, the record concentrates on up-tempo swingers done with a light touch. Again, the songs were all standards -- "Just One of Those Things," "Wrap Your Troubles in Dreams," "All of Me"—which the singer felt benefited from the new thematic setting, new arrangements, and his increasingly playful and textured vocal style.

In 1955, the eight songs were combined with the eight songs from the 10" album Songs for Young Lovers on a new, 16 song, 12" LP (Capitol W-587) called Swing Easy!, featuring the Swing Easy! cover but including a miniature inset of the Songs for Young Lovers cover. In 1960, the 1954, 8 song, 10" album was re-released as a 12-song, 12" LP (Capitol W-1429) with four additional songs added to expand the running time: "Lean Baby", "I Love You", "How Could You Do A Thing Like That To Me?", and "Why Should I Cry Over You?".

== Original album track listing ==
=== Side one ===
1. "Just One of Those Things" (Cole Porter)
2. "I'm Gonna Sit Right Down (And Write Myself a Letter)" (Fred E. Ahlert, Joe Young)
3. "Sunday" (Chester Conn, Benny Krueger, Ned Miller, Jule Styne)
4. "Wrap Your Troubles in Dreams" (Harry Barris, Ted Koehler, Billy Moll)

=== Side two ===
1. "Taking a Chance on Love" (Vernon Duke, Ted Fetter, John Latouche)
2. "Jeepers Creepers" (Harry Warren, Johnny Mercer)
3. "Get Happy" (Ted Koehler, Harold Arlen)
4. "All of Me" (Gerald Marks, Seymour Simons)

== Expanded LP track listing ==
1. "Jeepers Creepers" (Harry Warren, Johnny Mercer)
2. "Taking a Chance on Love" (Vernon Duke, Ted Fetter, John Latouche)
3. "Wrap Your Troubles in Dreams" (Harry Barris, Ted Koehler, Billy Moll)
4. "Lean Baby" (Roy Alfred, Billy May)
5. "I Love You" (Harry Archer, Harlan Thompson)
6. "I'm Gonna Sit Right Down (And Write Myself a Letter)" (Fred E. Ahlert, Joe Young)
7. "Get Happy" (Ted Koehler, Harold Arlen)
8. "All of Me" (Seymour Simons, Gerald Marks)
9. "How Could You Do a Thing Like That to Me" (Tyree Glenn, Allan Roberts)
10. "Why Should I Cry Over You?" (Chester Conn, Nathan "Ned" Miller)
11. "Sunday" (Chester Conn, Benny Krueger, Nathan "Ned" Miller, Jule Styne)
12. "Just One of Those Things" (Cole Porter)

== Certifications ==
Region	Certification	Certified units/sales
United Kingdom (BPI)	Gold	100,000^{*}
^{*} Sales figures based on certification alone.

== Complete personnel ==
- Frank Sinatra – vocals
- Nelson Riddle – arranger, conductor
