= Carl Ravazza =

American violinist, vocalist and bandleader

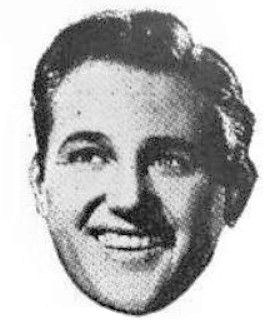
Carl Ravazza, c. 1943

Carl Ravazza (July 21, 1910 – July 28, 1968), also known professionally as Carl Ravell, was an American violinist, vocalist and bandleader.

Born in Alameda, California, Ravazza was a violinist who also started singing when he was in the Anson Weeks Orchestra. He was later the lead violinist with Tom Coakley when he took over that band upon Coakley's retirement from the music business. The Carl Ravazza or Carl Ravell Orchestra, with the theme song "Vieni Su", performed mainly in hotel venues in several cities in the United States. Ravazza later became a solo singer, settling in Reno, Nevada where he co-founded the Nevada Entertainment Agency in 1960.

Ravazza's 1937 version of "So Rare" may be the earliest recording of the song, although it is unclear whether it was the first released version. Recorded on June 4, 1937, it was released under the name of Carl Ravell and His Orchestra.
