= I'll Never Be the Same =

"I'll Never Be The Same" is a popular song based on an instrumental called "Little Buttercup" written by Matty Malneck and Frank Signorelli. After several musicians had recorded the instrumental version, lyrics were written by Gus Kahn. The completed song was introduced in 1932 by Mildred Bailey and Paul Whiteman; their version rose to number fourteen on the charts. The same year, Guy Lombardo recorded the song; his version rose to number eight. It is ranked 210 in JazzStandards.com's listing of the 1000 most-frequently recorded jazz standard compositions.

== Notable recordings ==
- Adelaide Hall, with Art Tatum included on piano - (1932)
- Mildred Bailey, with Paul Whiteman and his Orchestra - (1932)
- Guy Lombardo and His Royal Canadians - (1932)
- Billie Holiday, with Teddy Wilson and Lester Young - (1937)
- Artie Shaw and His Orchestra - (1945)
- Frank Sinatra for the album In the Wee Small Hours - (1955)
- Louis Armstrong, accompanied by Oscar Peterson: Louis Armstrong Meets Oscar Peterson - (1957)
- Coleman Hawkins for the album The Hawk Relaxes - (1961)
