= Songs for Young Lovers =

Studio album by Frank Sinatra
- Released: January 4, 1954
- Recorded: November 5–6, 1953
- Studios: Capitol Studios, Hollywood
- Genres: Vocal jazz; traditional pop
- Length: 21:42
- Label: Capitol
- Producer: Voyle Gilmore

Frank Sinatra chronology
Sing and Dance with Frank Sinatra (1950)	Songs for Young Lovers (1954)	Swing Easy! (1954)

Professional ratings
Review scores
Source	Rating
Allmusic	4.5/5 stars
Encyclopedia of Popular Music	4/5 stars
Uncut	4/5 stars

Songs for Young Lovers is the seventh studio album by Frank Sinatra and his first on Capitol Records. It was issued as an 8-song, 10" album (Capitol H-488) and as a 45 rpm EP set, but it was the first Sinatra "album" not to have a 78 rpm multi-disc-album release. In 2002, it was one of 50 recordings chosen that year by the Library of Congress to be added to the National Recording Registry.

== Background ==
Prior to his switch to Capitol, Sinatra had already begun to change his sound. His experience in the nightclubs of Las Vegas had given him a more mature, jazzy sound that did not lose its intimacy. Additionally, his resounding success in From Here to Eternity infused him with renewed confidence. Sinatra now sings with assuredness born of the experience of survival. He convinced his new producer Voyle Gilmore to record the charts that he had performed at the Riviera and the Sands. The arrangements were usually performed by eight musicians when Sinatra performed live, but for the recording eleven musicians were used, possibly indicating orchestration had been reduced for the concerts.

== Recording ==
The tracks were conducted by Nelson Riddle, the sessions for this album and the preceding singles ("I've Got the World on a String" and "From Here to Eternity") initiating a long-standing collaboration between the arranger and singer that would continue for the next twenty years. All the arrangements were by one of Sinatra's Columbia Records arrangers, George Siravo, except for "Like Someone in Love", which Riddle arranged. Sinatra was using Siravo's charts in his contemporaneous night club appearances, and the studio musicians were surprised by the worn condition of the charts, which differed from the new music pages typically distributed at such a recording session.

Songs For Young Lovers followed a formula similar to Sinatra's previous releases for Columbia – rather than compiling a potentially inconsistent set of former hits, a set of newly recorded songs would be arranged around a specific theme or concept. This time around, the singer had more artistic freedom, and producer Voyle Gilmore was supportive of the album's consistent format. In addition, the state-of-the-art Capitol studios were capable of producing a more detailed sound, which gave Riddle more freedom in his arrangements and orchestrations.

== Release ==
The album was originally released in January 1954. The album art features a young couple taking a private stroll in the dark, with Sinatra leaning against a lamp-post in the foreground. In 1955, the eight songs were combined with the eight songs from the 10" album Swing Easy! on a new, 16 song, 12" LP (Capitol W-587) called Swing Easy!, featuring the Swing Easy! cover but including a miniature inset of the Songs for Young Lovers cover.

In 1962, the 1954, 8-song, 10" album was released as a 12-song, 12" LP (Capitol W-1432) with four extra songs added: "Someone To Watch Over Me", "My One And Only Love", "It Worries Me", and "I Can Read Between the Lines". The cover of the new album included both previous album covers. In 1971 it was re-issued as a ten track album under the name My One and Only Love.

== Impact ==
Nelson Riddle was influenced by Siravo's arrangements, and how well they fit Sinatra. Both arrangers knew that the arrangements should provide interest, but never overshadow the singer. Whereas Siravo was rooted in swing, Riddle would break from those confinements. As Riddle received credit and Siravo received none, Siravo came to resent the slight. Riddle, although in no way responsible for the lack of due credit, was later to send personal apologies.

In 2002, it was one of 50 recordings chosen that year by the Library of Congress to be added to the National Recording Registry.

== Original album track listing ==
=== Side One ===
1. "My Funny Valentine" (Richard Rodgers, Lorenz Hart) – 2:31
2. "The Girl Next Door" (Ralph Blane, Hugh Martin) – 2:38
3. "A Foggy Day" (George Gershwin, Ira Gershwin) – 2:39
4. "Like Someone in Love" (Jimmy Van Heusen, Johnny Burke) – 3:10

=== Side Two ===
1. "I Get a Kick Out of You" (Cole Porter) – 2:55
2. "Little Girl Blue" (Rodgers, Hart) – 2:54
3. "They Can't Take That Away from Me" (George Gershwin, Ira Gershwin) – 1:58
4. "Violets for Your Furs" (Tom Adair, Matt Dennis) – 3:05

== Expanded LP track listing ==
1. "The Girl Next Door" (Ralph Blane, Hugh Martin) – 2:38
2. "They Can't Take That Away from Me" (George Gershwin, Ira Gershwin) – 1:58
3. "Violets for Your Furs" (Tom Adair, Matt Dennis) – 3:05
4. "Someone to Watch Over Me" (George Gershwin, Ira Gershwin) – 2:56
5. "My One and Only Love" (Guy Wood, Robert Mellin) – 3:11
6. "Little Girl Blue" (Richard Rodgers, Lorenz Hart) – 2:54
7. "Like Someone in Love" (Jimmy Van Heusen, Johnny Burke) – 3:10
8. "A Foggy Day" (George Gershwin, Ira Gershwin) – 2:39
9. "It Worries Me" (Bix Reichner, Reichel Schulz, Carl Sigman) – 2:52
10. "I Can Read Between the Lines" (Sid Frank, Ramon Getzov) – 2:47
11. "I Get a Kick Out of You" (Cole Porter) – 2:55
12. "My Funny Valentine" (Richard Rodgers, Lorenz Hart) – 2:31

== Personnel ==
- Frank Sinatra – vocals
- Nelson Riddle – conductor, arranger (for "Like Someone In Love")
- George Siravo – arranger (for all songs except "Like Someone In Love")
- Hollywood String Quartet
