= So Rare =

Single by Jimmy Dorsey with Orchestra and Chorus

from the album The Fabulous Jimmy Dorsey
- B-side: "Sophisticated Swing"
- Released: January 1957
- Recorded: November 11, 1956
- Studio: Capitol, New York City
- Genre: Big band
- Length: 2:30
- Label: Fraternity
- Songwriters: Jerry Herst (composer), Jack Sharpe (lyricist)

"So Rare" is a popular song published in 1937 by composer Jerry Herst and lyricist Jack Sharpe. It became a no. 2 chart hit for Jimmy Dorsey in 1957.

The version by Carl Ravell and his Orchestra, from a session on 4 June 1937, was the earliest recording of the song, although it is unclear whether it was the first released version. The earliest popular versions of "So Rare" were the 1937 releases by Guy Lombardo and his Royal Canadians and by Gus Arnheim and his Coconut Grove Orchestra.

Before it had been recorded or even published, Fred Astaire had sung "So Rare" on his radio show The Packard Hour. This was the recollection of Jess Oppenheimer, then a writer for the show, who recommended the song on behalf of his friend Jerry Herst, then an "aspiring songwriter". According to Oppenheimer, this led to "So Rare" being "snapped up by a publisher who heard it on the program".

Since 1937, "So Rare" has been recorded by numerous artists, but it notably became a late-career hit in 1957 for Jimmy Dorsey, reaching #2 on Billboard magazine's pop charts, and #4 on the R&B singles chart. Recorded on 11 November 1956 and released on the Cincinnati label Fraternity, Jimmy Dorsey's version, which had a decidedly rhythm and blues feel unlike the earlier versions, became the highest-charting song by a big band during the first decade of the rock and roll era. Credited on the label to "Jimmy Dorsey with Orchestra and Chorus", the vocals are by the Artie Malvin Singers. Billboard ranked this version as the No. 5 song for 1957.

Less than two months after "So Rare" became a hit, Jimmy Dorsey died from lung cancer.

== Recorded versions ==
- Carl Ravell and his Orchestra (1937)
- Henry King & His Orchestra (1937)
- Gus Arnheim and his Coconut Grove Orchestra (1937)
- Jimmy Ray & the Southern Serenaders (1937)
- Guy Lombardo and his Royal Canadians (1937)
- Carroll Gibbons And The Savoy Hotel Orpheans (1937)
- Josephine Bradley and her Ballroom Orchestra (1937)
- Edgar Hayes Quintet (1942)
- Vera Lynn (1952)
- Marian McPartland and George Shearing (1953)
- Toots Thielmans (c.1955)
- Bing Crosby (1957)
- Jimmy Dorsey (1957)
- The Kirchin Band & The Bandits (1957)
- Frank Chacksfield & his Orchestra (1958)
- Don Cherry (1958)
- Jimmy Carroll Orchestra (195?)
- Andy Williams (1959)
- Dick Richards & his Orchestra (1959)
- Bobby Byrne And The Alumni Orchestra (1959)
- Ella Fitzgerald (1960)
- Mavis Rivers (1960)
- Esquivel y su Orquesta (1960)
- Mose Allison (1961)
- King Curtis (1961)
- Bill Black (1962)
- Chet Atkins (1964)
- Ray Conniff (1965)
- The Mills Brothers (1967)
- The Voices of East Harlem (1974)
- Joe Pass and Jimmy Rowles (1981)
- Beegie Adair (2009)

== See also ==
- Billboard year-end top 50 singles of 1957
- List of CHUM number-one singles of 1957
