= Matty Malneck =

American songwriter

- Born: December 9, 1903; Newark, New Jersey, U.S.
- Died: February 25, 1981 (aged 77); Hollywood, California, U.S.
- Genres: Jazz, swing
- Occupation(s): Musician, songwriter
- Instrument: Violin
- Years active: 1920s–1940s

Matthew Michael "Matty" Malneck (December 9, 1903 – February 25, 1981) was an American jazz violinist, songwriter, and arranger.

== Career ==
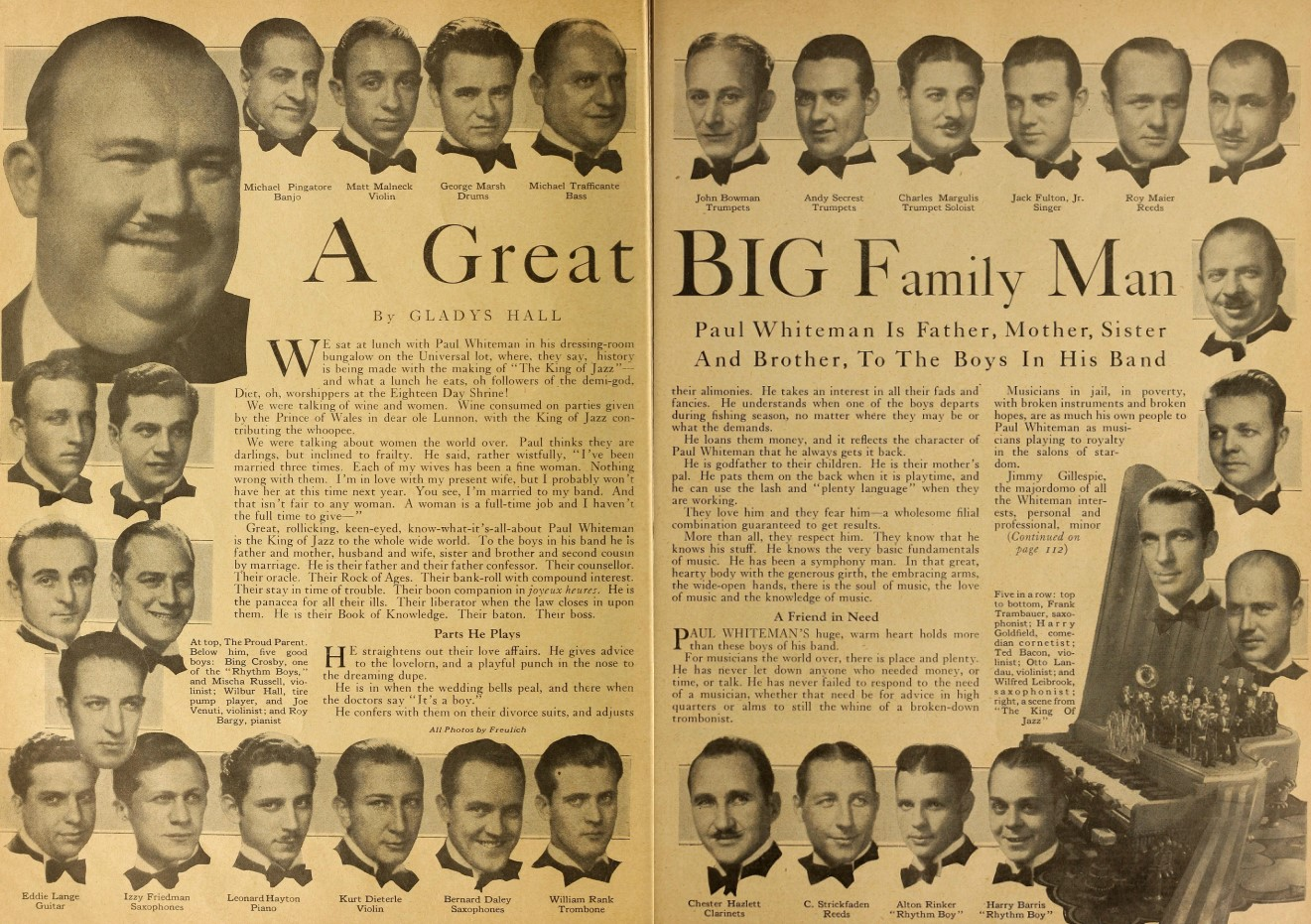
Paul Whiteman Orchestra - Motion Picture, June 1930

Born in 1903, Malneck's career as a violinist began when he was age 16. He was a member of the Paul Whiteman orchestra from 1926 to 1937 and during the same period recorded with Mildred Bailey, Annette Hanshaw, Frank Signorelli, and Frankie Trumbauer. He led a big band that recorded for Brunswick, Columbia, and Decca. His orchestra provided music for The Charlotte Greenwood Show on radio in the mid-1940s and Campana Serenade in 1942–1943.

A newspaper article published September 19, 1938, noted that having only one brass instrument in Malneck's eight-instrument group was "unique for swing" as were the $3,000 harp and a drummer who played on "an old piece of corrugated paper box". The group played in the film St. Louis Blues (1939) and You're in the Army Now (1941). Malneck announced he was changing the group's name to Matty Malneck and His St. Louis Blues Orchestra.

Malneck's credits as a songwriter have overshadowed his contributions as a performer. He composed songs which became hits, such as "Eeny Meeny Miney Mo" (1935) and "Goody Goody" (1936; both with lyrics by Johnny Mercer), "I'll Never Be the Same" (1932; music by Malneck & Frank Signorelli, lyrics by Gus Kahn), and "I'm Thru With Love" (1931; music by Malneck & Fud Livingston, lyrics by Kahn).
