= You Make Me Feel So Young =

Song
- Published: 1946 by Bregman, Vocco & Conn
- Composer: Josef Myrow
- Lyricist: Mack Gordon

"You Make Me Feel So Young" is a 1946 popular song composed by Josef Myrow, with lyrics written by Mack Gordon. It was introduced in the 1946 musical film Three Little Girls in Blue, where it was sung by the characters and performed by Vera-Ellen and Charles Smith (with voices dubbed by Carol Stewart and Del Porter).

== Other recordings ==
Several artists have covered the song, including:

- Frank Sinatra on Songs for Swingin' Lovers! (1956) and on Sinatra at the Sands (1966). The song was performed frequently throughout his career.
- Ella Fitzgerald
- Helen Reddy
- Michael Bublé
- Angelina Jordan
