= Josef Myrow =

Russian-born composer (1910–1987)

Josef Myrow (February 18, 1910 – December 24, 1987 in Los Angeles, California) was a Russian-born composer, known for his work in film scores in the 1940s and 1950s. He was twice nominated for an Academy Award: in 1947 for the song "You Do" from the film Mother Wore Tights and in 1950 for "Wilhelmina" from the film Wabash Avenue. Both songs were written with Mack Gordon. Other notable compositions include "Autumn Nocturne" (lyrics later added by Kim Gannon) and "You Make Me Feel So Young" (again with Mack Gordon).

He also wrote, with Robert Mills, "C A P Is on the Go", the official song of the Civil Air Patrol, the United States Air Force Auxiliary.

He died from the effects of Parkinson's disease in late 1987. He was married to Beatrice Myrow.
