= The Real Complete Columbia Years V-Discs =

Compilation album by Frank Sinatra
- Released: November 25, 2003
- Recorded: October 17, 1943– December 6, 1948
- Genre: Traditional pop
- Length: 209:52
- Label: Jazz Factory

Frank Sinatra chronology
| Classic Duets (2002) | The Real Complete Columbia Years V-Discs (2003) | The Platinum Collection (2004) |

The Real Complete Columbia Years V-Discs is a 2003 compilation album by the American singer Frank Sinatra. The 3-CD compilation includes four transcription discs pressed for Armed Forces Radio Service but not released on The Columbia Years 1943-1952: The V-Discs. The first album is also included in this collection.

== Track listing ==
Disc one
| No. | Title | Writer(s) | Length |
|---|---|---|---|
| 1. | "I Only Have Eyes for You" | Al Dubin, Harry Warren | 3:58 |
| 2. | "Kiss Me Again" | Henry Martyn Blossom, Victor Herbert | 2:41 |
| 3. | "(There'll Be A) Hot Time in the Town of Berlin" | Joe Bushkin, John DeVries | 2:28 |
| 4. | "The Music Stopped" | Harold Adamson, Jimmy McHugh | 2:58 |
| 5. | "I Couldn't Sleep a Wink Last Night" | Harold Adamson, Jimmy McHugh | 3:00 |
| 6. | "The Way You Look Tonight" | Dorothy Fields, Jerome Kern | 2:41 |
| 7. | "I'll Be Around" | Alec Wilder | 1:40 |
| 8. | "You've Got a Hold on Me" | Alan Jay Lerner, Frederick Loewe | 2:32 |
| 9. | "A Lovely Way to Spend an Evening" | Harold Adamson, Jimmy McHugh | 3:10 |
| 10. | "(I Got A Woman Crazy For Me) She's Funny That Way" | Richard A. Whiting, Neil Moret | 2:14 |
| 11. | "Speak Low" | Ogden Nash, Kurt Weill | 2:21 |
| 12. | "Close to You" | Jerry Livingston, Carl Lampl, Al Hoffman | 3:13 |
| 13. | "My Shining Hour" | Harold Arlen, Johnny Mercer | 2:26 |
| 14. | "Long Ago (And Far Away)" | George Gershwin, Jerome Kern | 2:37 |
| 15. | "Some Other Time" | Sammy Cahn, Jule Styne | 2:37 |
| 16. | "Come Out, Come Out, Wherever You Are" | Sammy Cahn, Jule Styne | 2:02 |
| 17. | "Put Your Dreams Away (For Another Day)" | Ruth Lowe, Paul Mann, George David Weiss | 1:30 |
| 18. | "And Then You Kissed Me" | Sammy Cahn, Jule Styne | 3:05 |
| 19. | "All the Things You Are" | Oscar Hammerstein II, Jerome Kern | 2:52 |
| 20. | "All of Me" | Gerald Marks, Seymour Simons | 1:42 |
| 21. | "Nancy (With the Laughing Face)" | Phil Silvers, Jimmy Van Heusen | 3:38 |
| 22. | "Mighty Lak' a Rose" | Frank Lebby Stanton, Ethelbert Nevin | 3:43 |
| 23. | "Falling in Love With Love" | Lorenz Hart, Richard Rodgers | 2:39 |
| 24. | "Cradle Song (Brahms' Lullaby)" | Johannes Brahms | 2:48 |
| 25. | "I'll Follow My Secret Heart" | Noël Coward | 2:35 |

Disc two
| No. | Title | Writer(s) | Length |
|---|---|---|---|
| 1. | "Someone to Watch Over Me" | George Gershwin, Ira Gershwin | 2:10 |
| 2. | "There's No You" | Tom Adair, Hal Hopper | 2:43 |
| 3. | "Let Me Love You Tonight" | Mitchell Parish, René Touzet | 2:43 |
| 4. | "Just Close Your Eyes" | John M. Elliot, Sam Mineo, Lewis Rodgers | 1:39 |
| 5. | "If You Are but a Dream" | Moe Jaffe, Jack Fulton, Nat Bronx | 3:06 |
| 6. | "Saturday Night (Is the Loneliest Night in the Week)" | Sammy Cahn, Jule Styne | 2:46 |
| 7. | "I Begged Her" | Sammy Cahn, Jule Styne | 3:02 |
| 8. | "What Makes the Sunset?" | Sammy Cahn, Jule Styne | 2:57 |
| 9. | "The Charm of You" | Sammy Cahn, Jule Styne | 3:02 |
| 10. | "When Your Lover Has Gone" | Einar Aaron Swan | 2:55 |
| 11. | "None But the Lonely Heart" | Pyotr Ilyich Tchaikovsky, Arthur Westbrook | 3:28 |
| 12. | "Ol' Man River" | Oscar Hammerstein II, Jerome Kern | 4:11 |
| 13. | "Over the Rainbow" | Arlen, Yip Harburg | 3:17 |
| 14. | "You'll Never Walk Alone" | Oscar Hammerstein II, Richard Rodgers | 3:27 |
| 15. | "Stars in Your Eyes" | Mort Greene, Ricardo López Méndez, Gabriel Ruiz (composer) | 2:47 |
| 16. | "My Shawl" | Xavier Cugat, Pedro Berrios, Stanley Adams | 3:17 |
| 17. | "Someone to Watch Over Me" | George Gershwin, Ira Gershwin | 3:22 |
| 18. | "You Go to My Head" | J. Fred Coots, Haven Gillespie | 3:02 |
| 19. | "These Foolish Things" | Harry Link, Holt Marvell, Jack Strachey | 3:10 |
| 20. | "I Don't Know Why (I Just Do)" | Fred E. Ahlert, Roy Turk | 2:47 |
| 21. | "Homesick, That's All" | Gordon Jenkins | 3:14 |
| 22. | "The Night Is Young and You're So Beautiful" | Dana Suesse, Irving Kahal, Billy Rose | 2:12 |
| 23. | "Aren't You Glad You're You" | Johnny Burke, James Van Heusen | 2:08 |
| 24. | "You Brought a New Kind of Love to Me" | Sammy Fain, Irving Kahal, Pierre Connor | 1:34 |

Disc three
| No. | Title | Writer(s) | Length |
|---|---|---|---|
| 1. | "I'll Never Smile Again" | Ruth Lowe | 3:26 |
| 2. | "Without a Song" | Edward Eliscu, Rose, Vincent Youmans | 2:20 |
| 3. | "Oh! What It Seemed to Be" | Bennie Benjamin, Frankie Carle, George David Weiss | 2:56 |
| 4. | "Old School Teacher" | Willard Robison | 3:24 |
| 5. | "White Christmas" | Irving Berlin | 3:14 |
| 6. | "My Romance" | Lorenz Hart, Richard Rodgers | 3:14 |
| 7. | "The Song Is You" | Oscar Hammerstein II, Jerome Kern | 3:35 |
| 8. | "Should I? (Reveal)" | Nacio Herb Brown, Arthur Freed | 2:26 |
| 9. | "Oh Bess, Oh Where's My Bess?" | George Gershwin, DuBose Heyward | 3:09 |
| 10. | "Soliloquy" | Oscar Hammerstein II, Richard Rodgers | 8:09 |
| 11. | "I Fall in Love With You Ev'ry Day" | Sam H. Stept | 1:47 |
| 12. | "They Say It's Wonderful" | Irving Berlin | 2:38 |
| 13. | "You Are Too Beautiful" | Lorenz Hart, Richard Rodgers | 2:54 |
| 14. | "Come Rain or Come Shine" | Harold Arlen, Johnny Mercer | 2:28 |
| 15. | "One for My Baby (and One More for the Road)" | Harold Arlen, Johnny Mercer | 3:07 |
| 16. | "Stormy Weather" | Harold Arlen, Ted Koehler | 3:55 |
| 17. | "Sunflower" | Mack David | 3:04 |
| 18. | "If You Are But a Dream" | Bonx, Fulton, Jaffe | 3:46 |
| 19. | "Strange Music" | Robert B. Wright, George Forrest, Edvard Grieg | 3:27 |
| 20. | "Cradle Song (Brahms' Lullaby)" | Johannes Brahms | 2:37 |
| 21. | "Dick Haymes, Dick Todd and Como" | Burke, Cahn, Van Heusen | 2:40 |
| 22. | "Don't Forget Tonight, Tomorrow" | Jay Milton, Ukie Sherin | 2:28 |
| 23. | "Was the Last Time I Saw You (The Last Time)" | Marjorie Goetschius, Edna Osser | 2:59 |

== Personnel ==
- Frank Sinatra – vocals
- Axel Stordahl – conductor
- Tommy Dorsey – conductor

== See also ==
- V-Disc Recordings, Jo Stafford
