= Frank Sinatra in Hollywood 1940–1964 =

Frank Sinatra in Hollywood 1940-1964

Compilation album by Frank Sinatra
- Released: May 21, 2002
- Recorded: 1940–1964
- Genre: Traditional pop
- Length: 363:39
- Label: Rhino / Reprise

Frank Sinatra chronology
Greatest Love Songs (2002)	Frank Sinatra in Hollywood 1940-1964 (2002)	Classic Duets (2002)

Professional ratings
Review scores
Source	Rating
AllMusic	4.5/5 stars

Frank Sinatra in Hollywood 1940–1964 is a 2002 compilation album by the American singer Frank Sinatra. The box set collates songs that Sinatra recorded for films made by Paramount, MGM, Columbia, RKO, Universal, Warner Bros., United Artists, and 20th Century Fox, between 1940 and 1964.

== Track listing ==
=== Disc one ===
From "Las Vegas Nights" (PARAMOUNT, 03/28/1941) :

- 1. "Delores" (outtake) - (Louis Alter, Frank Loesser) - 3:25

^{(rec. 11/24/1940, Frank Sinatra, The Pied Pipers, Tommy Dorsey And His Orchestra)}

- 2. "I'll Never Smile Again" - (Ruth Lowe) - 3:14

^{(rec. 11/24/1940, Frank Sinatra, Jo Stafford, The Pied Pipers, Tommy Dorsey And His Orchestra)}

From "Ship Ahoy" (MGM, 05/15/1942)

- 3. Radio Spot for "Ship Ahoy" (Excerpt) - 2:09

^{(Aired circa 1942, Frank Sinatra)}

- 4. "Moonlight Bay" - (Edward Madden, Percy Wenrich) - 2:43

^{(rec. 12/29/1941, Frank Sinatra, The Pied Pipers, Mixed Chorus, Tommy Dorsey And His Orchestra)}

- 5. "Poor You" - (Yip Harburg, Burton Lane) - 5:47

^{(rec. 12/16/1941, Frank Sinatra, Red Skelton, Virginia O'Brien, Eleanor Powell, Tommy Dorsey And His Orchestra)}

- 6. "The Last Call for Love" - (Marcus Cummings, Harburg, Lane) - 2:27

^{(rec. 12/16/1941, Frank Sinatra, Jo Stafford, The Pied Pipers, Tommy Dorsey And His Orchestra)}

- 7. "Blue Skies" (outtake) - (Irving Berlin) - 2:57

^{(rec. 12/15/1941, Frank Sinatra, Ziggy Elman (Trumpet), Band Chorus, Tommy Dorsey And His Orchestra)}

- 8. Finale : "The Last Call for Love" - 1:18

^{(rec. 01/30/1942, Frank Sinatra, The Pied Pipers, Mixed Chorus, Tommy Dorsey And His Orchestra)}

From "Reveille with Beverly" (COLUMBIA, 02/04/1943)'

- 9. "Night and Day" - (Cole Porter) - 3:13

^{(rec. 09/17/1942, Frank Sinatra, The Columbia Pictures Orchestra, Morris Stoloff)}

From "Higher and Higher" (RKO, 12/11/1943)

- 10. "I Couldn't Sleep a Wink Last Night" - (Harold Adamson, Jimmy McHugh) - 2:13

^{(rec. 09/08/1943, Frank Sinatra, Stanley Wrightsman (Piano), The RKO Radio Studio Orchestra, Constantin Bakaleinikoff)}

- 11. "The Music Stopped" - (Adamson, McHugh) - 3:01

^{(rec. 09/01/1943, Frank Sinatra, The RKO Radio Studio Orchestra, Constantin Bakaleinikoff)}

- 12. "I Saw You First" - (Adamson, McHugh) - 1:43

^{(rec. 08/24/1943, Frank Sinatra, Marcy McGuire, The RKO Radio Studio Orchestra, Constantin Bakaleinikoff)}

- 13. "A Lovely Way to Spend an Evening" (w/ Orch.) - (Adamson, McHugh) - 3:12

^{(rec. 09/08/1943, Frank Sinatra, The RKO Radio Studio Orchestra, Constantin Bakaleinikoff)}

- 14. "A Lovely Way to Spend an Evening" (w/ Piano) - (Adamson, McHugh) - 1:48

^{(rec. 09/08/1943, Frank Sinatra, Stanley Wrightsman (Piano))}

- 15. "You're on Your Own" - (Adamson, McHugh) - 2:31

^{(rec. 08/24/1943, Frank Sinatra, Dooley Wilson, Mel Tormé, Marcy McGuire, Michèle Morgan, Victor Borge, The RKO Radio Studio Orchestra, Constantin Bakaleinikoff)}

- 16. "You're on Your Own" (Reprise) - (Adamson, McHugh) - 0:57

^{(rec. 08/24/1943, Frank Sinatra, The RKO Radio Studio Orchestra, Constantin Bakaleinikoff)}

- 17. Finale: "I Saw You First"/"A Lovely Way to Spend an Evening"/"The Music Stopped" - (Adamson, McHugh) - 1:30

^{(rec. 09/01/1943 & 09/08/1943, Frank Sinatra, Marcy McGuire, Barbara Hale, Chorus, The RKO Radio Studio Orchestra, Constantin Bakaleinikoff)}

From "Your Hit Parade Extra" (Presented by Lucky Strike, 1943)

- 18. "Stardust" - (Hoagy Carmichael, Mitchell Parish) - 2:33

^{(rec. circa 1943, Frank Sinatra, The Hit Paraders, The Hit Parade Orchestra, Mark Warnow)}

From "The Road To Victory" (a.k.a. "The Shining Future") (WARNER BROS., 05/18/1944)

- 19. "(There'll Be A) Hot Time in the Town of Berlin (When the Yanks Go ...)" - (Joe Bushkin, John DeVries) - 1:53

^{(rec. 03/04/1944, Frank Sinatra, The Warner Bros. Studio Orchestra, Leo Forbstein)}

From "The All-Star Bond Rally" (20th CENTURY-FOX, 04/25/1945)

- 20. "Saturday Night (Is the Loneliest Night of the Week)" - (Sammy Cahn, Jule Styne) - 2:05

^{(rec. 11/08/1943, Frank Sinatra, Harry James And His Orchestra)}

From "Step Lively" (RKO, 06/24/1944)

- 21. "Come Out, Come Out, Wherever You Are" - (Sammy Cahn, Jule Styne) - 2:02

^{(rec. 01/31/1944, Frank Sinatra, Gloria DeHaven, Chorus, The RKO Radio Studio Orchestra, Constantin Bakaleinikoff)}

- 22. "As Long as There's Music" - (Cahn, Styne) - 2:02

^{(rec. 01/31/1944, Frank Sinatra, The RKO Radio Studio Orchestra, Constantin Bakaleinikoff)}

- 23. "Where Does Love Begin?" - (Cahn, Styne) - 2:15

^{(rec. 02/21/1944, Frank Sinatra, Anne Jeffreys, The RKO Radio Studio Orchestra, Constantin Bakaleinikoff)}

- 24. "Some Other Time" - (Cahn, Styne) - 1:34

^{(rec. 02/24/1944, Frank Sinatra, The RKO Radio Studio Orchestra, Constantin Bakaleinikoff)}

- 25. "Some Other Time" (Ft. Gloria DeHaven) - (Cahn, Styne) - 3:14

^{(rec. 02/24/1944, Frank Sinatra, Gloria DeHaven, The RKO Radio Studio Orchestra, Constantin Bakaleinikoff)}

- 26. "And Then You Kissed Me" (Outtake) - (Cahn, Styne) - 2:07

^{(rec. 02/24/1944, Frank Sinatra, The RKO Radio Studio Orchestra, Constantin Bakaleinikoff)}

- 27. Finale: "As Long as There's Music"/"Some Other Time"/"As Long as There's Music" - (Cahn, Styne) - 4:37

^{(rec. 02/25/1944, Frank Sinatra, Gloria DeHaven, George Murphy, Chorus, RKO Radio Studio Orchestra, C. Bakaleinikoff)}

=== Disc two ===
From "Anchors Aweigh" (MGM, 07/19/1945)

- 1. "We Hate to Leave" (Cahn, Styne) - 1:49

^{(rec. 06/13/44, Frank Sinatra, Gene Kelly, The M-G-M Studio Chorus, The M-G-M Studio Orchestra, George Stoll)}

- 2. "The Cradle Song" - (Brahms' Lullaby) (Johannes Brahms) - 1:35

^{(rec. 06/4/44, Frank Sinatra, The M-G-M Studio Orchestra, George Stoll)}

- 3. "I Begged Her" - (Cahn, Styne) - 3:26

^{(rec. 06/14/44, Frank Sinatra, Gene Kelly, The M-G-M Studio Orchestra, George Stoll)}

- 4. "If You Knew Susie Like I Know Susie" - (Buddy DeSylva, Joseph Meyer) - 2:00

^{(rec. 06/13/44, Frank Sinatra, Gene Kelly, The M-G-M Studio Orchestra, George Stoll)}

- 5. "What Makes the Sunset?" - (Cahn, Styne) - 3:33

^{(rec. 06/30/44, Frank Sinatra, The M-G-M Studio Orchestra, George Stoll)}

- 6. "The Charm of You" - (Cahn, Styne) - 2:18

^{(rec. 08/18/44, Frank Sinatra, The M-G-M Studio Orchestra, George Stoll)}

- 7. "I Fall in Love Too Easily" - (Cahn, Styne) - 1:38

^{(rec. 09/05/44, Frank Sinatra, The M-G-M Studio Orchestra, George Stoll)}

From "The House I Live In" (RKO, 1945)

- 8. Acceptance Speech for Receiving an Honorary Academy Award - 2:54

^{(rec. 03/07/46, Frank Sinatra)}

- 9. "The House I Live In" - (Lewis, Robinson) - 3:22

^{(rec. 05/08/45, Frank Sinatra, The RKO Radio Studio Orchestra, Axel Stordahl)}

- 10. "If You Are But a Dream" - (Nat Bonx, Jack Fulton, Moe Jaffe) - 2:12

^{(rec. 05/08/45, Frank Sinatra, The RKO Radio Studio Orchestra, Axel Stordahl)}

From "A Thousand and One Nights" (COLUMBIA, 07/20/1945)

- 11. "All or Nothing at All" - (Arthur Altman, Jack Lawrence) - 1:36

^{(rec. 04/26/45, Frank Sinatra, The Columbia Pictures Orchestra, Morris Stoloff)}

From "Till the Clouds Roll By" (MGM, 12/04/1946)

- 12. "Ol' Man River" - (Oscar Hammerstein II, Jerome Kern) - 3:00

^{(rec. 03/18/46, Frank Sinatra, The M-G-M Studio Chorus, The M-G-M Studio Orchestra, Lennie Hayton)}

From "It Happened in Brooklyn" (MGM 04/04/1947)

- 13. "Whose Baby Are You?" - (Cahn, Styne) - 0:57

^{(rec. 07/18/46, Frank Sinatra, André Previn (Piano))}

- 14. "The Brooklyn Bridge" - (Cahn, Styne) - 2:42

^{(rec. 06/06/46, Frank Sinatra, The M-G-M Studio Orchestra, Johnny W. Green)}

- 15. "The Brooklyn Bridge" (alternate ending/outtake) - (Cahn, Styne) - 1:05

^{(rec. 06/06/46, Frank Sinatra, The M-G-M Studio Orchestra, Johnny W. Green)}

- 16. "Invention #1" - (Johann Sebastian Bach) 2:15

^{(rec. 06/04/46, Frank Sinatra, Kathryn Grayson, School Children, The M-G-M Studio Orchestra, Johnny W. Green)}

- 17. "I Believe" - (Cahn, Styne) - 3:50

^{(rec. 10/21/46, Frank Sinatra, Jimmy Durante, Bobby Long, The M-G-M Studio Orchestra, Johnny W. Green)}

- 18. "Time After Time" - (Cahn, Styne) - 1:50

^{(rec. 09/17/46, Frank Sinatra, André Previn (Piano), The M-G-M Studio Orchestra, Johnny W. Green)}

- 19. "The Song's Gotta Come from the Heart" - (Cahn, Styne) - 4:17

^{(rec. 09/26/46, Frank Sinatra, Jimmy Durante (Vocal, Piano), The M-G-M Studio Orchestra, Johnny W. Green)}

- 20. "Otchi-Tchor-Ni-Ya" (Outtake) - (Traditional) - 0:43

^{(rec. 09/26/46, Frank Sinatra, The M-G-M Studio Orchestra, Johnny W. Green)}

- 21. "La Ci Darem la Mano" - (from Don Giovanni) (Wolfgang Amadeus Mozart) - 3:20

^{(rec. 07/18/46, Frank Sinatra, Kathryn Grayson, André Previn (Piano), The M-G-M Studio Orchestra, Johnny W. Green)}

- 22. "It's the Same Old Dream" - (Cahn, Styne) - 1:52

^{(rec. 09/23/46, Frank Sinatra, André Previn (Piano), The Starlighters, The M-G-M Studio Orchestra, Johnny W. Green)}

- 23. "It's the Same Old Dream" (Reprise) - (Cahn, Styne) - 2:36

^{(rec. 09/23/46, Frank Sinatra, André Previn (Piano), The Starlighters, The M-G-M Studio Orchestra, Johnny W. Green)}

- 24. Finale : "The Brooklyn Bridge" - (Cahn, Styne) - 0:51

^{(rec. 10/09/46, Frank Sinatra, The M-G-M Studio Orchestra, Johnny W. Green)}

- 25. Presentation of Modern Screen Magazine's Award for "Most Popular Film Star Of 1946" - 2:04

^{(rec. 10/09/46, Frank Sinatra, Louis B. Mayer)}

From "The Miracle of the Bells" (RKO, 03/16/1948)

- 26. "Ever Homeward" (A Capella) - (Cahn, Styne) - 1:32

^{(rec. 08/19/47 & 08/20/47, Frank Sinatra)}

- 27. Promotional Spot for "The Chapel of Four Chaplains" and "The Miracle Of The Bells" - 1:45

^{(rec. 03/18/48, Frank Sinatra)}

From "The Kissing Bandit" (MGM, 01/28/1949)

- 28. "If I Steal a Kiss" - (Nacio Herb Brown, Edward Heyman) - 3:06

^{(rec. 05/08/47, Frank Sinatra, The M-G-M Studio Orchestra, George Stoll)}

- 29. "Senorita" - (Brown, Heyman) - 2:15

^{(rec. 06/28/47, Frank Sinatra, Kathryn Grayson, The M-G-M Studio Chorus, The M-G-M Studio Orchestra, George Stoll)}

- 30. "Siesta" - (Brown, Earl Brent) - 2:06

^{(rec. 05/27/47, Frank Sinatra, The M-G-M Studio Chorus, The M-G-M Studio Orchestra, George Stoll)}

- 31. "What's Wrong With Me?" - (Brown, Heyman) - 1:29

^{(rec. 02/26/48, Frank Sinatra, Kathryn Grayson, The M-G-M Studio Orchestra, George Stoll)}

- 32. "We're on Our Way" (Outtake) - (Brown, Brent) - 2:59

^{(rec. 05/08/47, Frank Sinatra, J. Carrol Naish, The M-G-M Studio Orchestra, George Stoll)}

- 33. Finale : "If I Steal a Kiss" - (Brown, Heyman) - 1:24

^{(rec. 06/28/47, Frank Sinatra, Kathryn Grayson, The M-G-M Studio Orchestra, George Stoll)}

=== Disc three ===
- 1. Promotional interview discussing The Kissing Bandit and Take Me Out to the Ball Game - 3:16

^{(rec. 1949, Frank Sinatra, Dick Simmons)}

From "Take Me Out to the Ball Game" (MGM, 03/09/1949)

- 2. "Take Me Out to the Ball Game" - (Jack Norworth, Albert Von Tilzer) - 2:02

^{(rec. 07/22/48, Frank Sinatra, Gene Kelly, The M-G-M Studio Orchestra, Adolph Deutsch)}

- 3. "Yes, Indeedy" - (Betty Comden, Roger Edens, Adolph Green) - 3:16

^{(rec. 07/22/48, Frank Sinatra, Gene Kelly, Jules Munshin, The M-G-M Studio Chorus, The M-G-M Studio Orchestra, Adolph Deutsch )}

- 4. "O'Brien to Ryan to Goldberg" - (Comden, Edens, Green) - 4:02

^{(rec. 07/23/48, Frank Sinatra, Gene Kelly, Jules Munshin, The M-G-M Studio Orchestra, Adolph Deutsch)}

- 5. "The Right Girl for Me" - (Comden, Edens, Green) - 2:56

^{(rec. 08/12/48, Frank Sinatra, The M-G-M Studio Orchestra, Adolph Deutsch)}

- 6. "Boys and Girls Like You and Me" (Outtake) - (Oscar Hammerstein II, Richard Rodgers) - 3:26

^{(rec. 08/12/48, Frank Sinatra, The M-G-M Studio Orchestra, Adolph Deutsch)}

- 7. "It's Fate, Baby It's Fate" - (Comden, Edens, Green) - 3:13

^{(rec. 08/12/48, Frank Sinatra, Betty Garrett, The M-G-M Studio Orchestra, Adolph Deutsch)}

- 8. "Strictly U.S.A." - (Edens) - 3:21

^{(rec. 10/15/48, Frank Sinatra, Gene Kelly, Jules Munshin, Betty Garrett, Esther Williams, Dick Lane, Tommy Dugan, The M-G-M Studio Chorus, The M-G-M Studio Orchestra, Adolph Deutsch)}

- 9. Finale : "Strictly U.S.A." - (Edens) - 2:19

^{(rec. 10/15/48, Frank Sinatra, Gene Kelly, Jules Munshin, Betty Garrett, Esther Williams, Judy Matson, The M-G-M Studio Chorus, The M-G-M Studio Orchestra, Adolph Deutsch)}

From "On the Town" (MGM, 12/08/1949)

- 10. "New York, New York" (full length version) - (Comden, Green) - 4:07

^{(rec. 05/03/49, Frank Sinatra, Gene Kelly, Jules Munshin Ralph Brewster, Charles Pavalato, Marvin Bailey, Bill Lee, Harry Stanton, The M-G-M Studio Orchestra, Lennie Hayton)}

- 11. "Come Up to My Place" - (Leonard Bernstein, Comden, Green) - 2:53

^{(rec. 03/03/49, Frank Sinatra, Betty Garrett, The M-G-M Studio Orchestra, Lennie Hayton)}

- 12. "You're Awful" - (Comden, Edens, Green) - 3:18

^{(rec. 03/24/49, Frank Sinatra, Betty Garrett, The M-G-M Studio Orchestra, Lennie Hayton)}

- 13. "Count on Me" - (Comden, Edens, Green) - 3:33

^{(rec. 03/24/49, Frank Sinatra, Jules Munshin, Ann Miller, Betty Garrett, Alice Pearce, The M-G-M Studio Chorus, The M-G-M Studio Orchestra, Lennie Hayton)}

- 14. "Pearl of the Persian Sea" - (Comden, Edens, Green) - 2:07

^{(rec. 03/24/49, Frank Sinatra, Gene Kelly, Jules Munshin, The M-G-M Studio Orchestra, Lennie Hayton)}

- 15. "On the Town" - (Comden, Edens, Green) - 5:43

^{(rec. 03/23/49, Frank Sinatra, Gene Kelly, Jules Munshin, Ann Miller, Vera-Ellen, Betty Garrett, The M-G-M Studio Orchestra, Lennie Hayton)}

From "Double Dynamite" (RKO, 12/25/1951)

- 16. "It's Only Money" (Ft. Groucho Marx) - (Cahn, Styne) - 1:31

^{(rec. 01/28/49, Frank Sinatra, Groucho Marx, The RKO Radio Studio Orchestra, Constantin Bakaleinikoff)}

- 17. "Kisses and Tears" (Ft. Jane Russel) - (Cahn, Styne) - 3:29

^{(rec. 12/2/48, Frank Sinatra, Jane Russell, The RKO Radio Studio Orchestra, Constantin Bakaleinikoff)}

- 18. Finale : "It's Only Money" (Ft. Groucho Marx & Jane Russel) - (Cahn, Styne) - 1:08

^{(rec. 01/31/49, Frank Sinatra, Groucho Marx, Jane Russell, The RKO Radio Studio Orchestra, Constantin Bakaleinikoff)}

From "Meet Danny Wilson" (UNIVERSAL, 04/01/1952)

- 19. Promotional Spot for Meet Danny Wilson - 0:24

^{(rec. 1951, Frank Sinatra)}

- 20. "All of Me" - (Gerald Marks, Seymour Simons) - 1:31

^{(rec. 06/13/51, Frank Sinatra, Ken Lane (Piano), The Universal Studio Orchestra, Joseph Gershenson)}

- 21. "How Deep Is the Ocean?" - (Berlin) - 1:55

^{(rec. 06/13/51, Frank Sinatra, Ken Lane (Piano), The Universal Studio Orchestra, Joseph Gershenson)}

- 22. "You're a Sweetheart" - (Adamson, McHugh) - 2:21

^{(rec. 06/13/51, Frank Sinatra, Ken Lane (Piano), The Universal Studio Orchestra, Joseph Gershenson)}

- 23. "She's Funny That Way" (Edited version) - (Neil Moret, Richard A. Whiting) - 1:32

^{(rec. 06/13/51, Frank Sinatra, Ken Lane (Piano), Manny Klein (Trumpet), The Universal Studio Orchestra, Joseph Gershenson)}

- 24. "A Good Man Is Hard to Find" - (Eddie Green) - 2:58

^{(rec. 06/13/51, Frank Sinatra, Shelley Winters, Ken Lane (Piano), The Universal Studio Orchestra, Joseph Gershenson)}

- 25. "Lonesome Man Blues" (Edited version) - (Sy Oliver) - 1:29

^{(rec. 06/21/51, Frank Sinatra, Danny Welton (Harmonica), The Universal Studio Orchestra, Joseph Gershenson)}

- 26. "That Old Black Magic" - (Harold Arlen, Johnny Mercer) - 2:39

^{(rec. 06/13/51, Frank Sinatra, Ken Lane (Piano), The Universal Studio Orchestra, Joseph Gershenson)}

- 27. "I've Got a Crush on You" - (George Gershwin, Ira Gershwin) - 1:53

^{(rec. 07/11/51, Frank Sinatra, Ken Lane (Piano), The Ebonaires, The Universal Studio Orchestra, Joseph Gershenson)}

- 28. "When You're Smiling (The Whole World Smiles With You)" - (Mark Fisher, Joe Goodwin, Larry Shay) - 1:52

^{(rec. 06/13/51, Frank Sinatra, Ken Lane (Piano), The Universal Studio Orchestra, Joseph Gershenson)}

=== Disc four ===
From "From Here to Eternity" (COLUMBIA, 08/05/1953)

- 1. "From Here to Eternity"/"Re-Enlistment Blues" (Instrumental) - (Fred Karger, Robert Wells) - 2:54

^{(rec. 1953, The Columbia Pictures Orchestra, Morris Stoloff)}

- 2. Acceptance Speech for Receiving the "Academy Award for Best Supporting Actor" - 1:17

^{(rec. 03/25/54, Frank Sinatra)}

- 3. "From Here to Eternity" - (Karger, Wells) - 3:01

^{(rec. 05/02/53, Frank Sinatra, Orchestra, Nelson Riddle)}

From "Three Coins in the Fountain" (20th CENTURY-FOX, 05/12/1954)

- 4. Interview Discussing "Three Coins in The Fountain" & "Young At Heart" - 3:08

^{(rec. 05/06/54, Frank Sinatra, Louella Parsons)}

- 5. "Three Coins in the Fountain" (Capitol Records master) - (Cahn, Styne) - 3:04

^{(rec. 03/01/54, Frank Sinatra, Orchestra, Nelson Riddle)}

From "Young at Heart" (WARNER BROS. 12/16/1954)

- 6. "Young at Heart" (Capitol Records master) - (Carolyn Leigh, Johnny Richards) - 2:51

^{(rec. 12/09/53, Frank Sinatra, Orchestra, Nelson Riddle)}

- 7. "Someone to Watch Over Me" (Alternate Mix, w/orchestra) - (G. Gershwin, I. Gershwin) - 2:21

^{(rec. 07/12/54, Frank Sinatra, Bill Miller (Piano), The Warner Bros. Studio Orchestra, Ray Heindorf)}

- 8. "Just One of Those Things" (w/Jazz Quartet) - (Porter) - 2:08

^{(rec. 07/13/54 & 07/14/54, Frank Sinatra, Bill Miller (Piano), Jazz Quartet)}

- 9. "One for My Baby (and One More for the Road)" (Piano, Vocal) - (Arlen, Mercer) - 3:40

^{(rec. 08/11/54, Frank Sinatra, Bill Miller (Piano))}

- 10. "You, My Love" (Alternate Mix) - (Mack Gordon, Jimmy Van Heusen) - 2:13

^{(rec. 08/25/54, Frank Sinatra, Doris Day, The Warner Bros. Studio Orchestra, Ray Heindorf)}

From "Finian's Rainbow" (Unreleased) (Distributors Corp. Of America, 1954)

- 11. "Necessity" - (Harburg, Lane) - 2:42

^{(rec. 12/10/54, Frank Sinatra, Orchestra, Lynn Murray)}

- 12. "Ad Lib Blues" (Ft. Louis Armstrong) - (Traditional) - 1:56

^{(rec. 11/20/54, Frank Sinatra, Louis Armstrong, Jazz Trio, Orchestra, Lynn Murray)}

- 13. "That Great Come-And-Get-It Day" - (Harburg, Lane) - 2:11

^{(rec. 11/20/54, Frank Sinatra, Children's Chorus, Orchestra, Lynn Murray)}

- 14. "Necessity" (Scat Version) - (Harburg, Lane) - 0:26

^{(rec. 12/10/54, Frank Sinatra, Orchestra, Lynn Murray)}

- 15. "If This Isn't Love" - (Harburg, Lane) - 2:20

^{(rec. 12/09/54, Frank Sinatra, Children's Chorus, Orchestra, Lynn Murray)}

- 16. "Old Devil Moon" - (Harburg, Lane) - 8:00

^{(rec. 12/02/54, Frank Sinatra, Ella Logan, The Jazz All Stars (Red Norvo, Ray Brown, Herb Ellis, Oscar Peterson, Frank Flynn), Orchestra, Lynn Murray)}

- 17. "Old Devil Moon" (Reprise) (Piano, Vocal) - (Harburg, Lane) - 0:24

^{(rec. 11/20/54, Frank Sinatra, Oscar Peterson (Piano))}

- 18. "Necessity" (Ft. Ella Fitzgerald) - (Harburg, Lane) - 3:01

^{(rec. 11/20/54, Frank Sinatra, Ella Fitzgerald, The Oscar Peterson Trio, Orchestra, Lynn Murray)}

- 19. Finale:"How Are Things in Glocca Morra?" (Ft. Ella Logan) - (Harburg, Lane) - 1:00

^{(rec. 11/20/54, Frank Sinatra, Ella Logan, Chorus, Orchestra, Lynn Murray)}

From "Not as a Stranger" (UNITED ARTISTS, 06/28/1955)

- 20. "Not as a Stranger" - (Buddy Kaye, Van Heusen) - 2:46

^{(rec. 03/04/55, Frank Sinatra, Orchestra, Nelson Riddle)}

From "Guys and Dolls" (Samuel Goldwyn, 11/03/1955)

- 21. "The Oldest Established (Permanent Floating Crap Game in New York)" - (Loesser) - 3:01

^{(rec. 03/01/55, Frank Sinatra, Stubby Kaye, Johnny Silver, Chorus, Orchestra, Jay Blackton)}

- 22. "Guys and Dolls" - (Loesser) - 3:28

^{(rec. 03/01/55, Frank Sinatra, Stubby Kaye, Johnny Silver, Orchestra, Jay Blackton)}

- 23. "Adelaide" - (Loesser) - 3:19

^{(rec. 03/11/55, Frank Sinatra, Orchestra, Jay Blackton)}

- 24. "Sue Me" - (Loesser) - 2:56

^{(rec. 03/09/55, Frank Sinatra, Vivian Blaine, Orchestra, Jay Blackton)}

From "The Tender Trap" (MGM, 11/04/1955)

- 25. "(Love Is) The Tender Trap" (Main Title) - (Cahn, Van Heusen) - 3:09

^{(rec. 07/27/55, Frank Sinatra, The M-G-M Studio Orchestra, Jeff Alexander)}

- 26. "(Love Is) The Tender Trap" (Piano, Vocal) - (Cahn, Van Heusen) - 3:10

^{(rec. 07/15/55, Frank Sinatra, Bill Miller (Piano))}

- 27. "(Love Is) The Tender Trap" (End Title) - (Cahn, Van Heusen) -0:48

^{(rec. 07/27/55, Frank Sinatra, David Wayne, Celeste Holm, Debbie Reynolds, Betty Noyes, Barbara Allen, Dorothy McCarty, The M-G-M Studio Orchestra, Jeff Alexander)}

=== Disc five ===
From "Carousel" (20th CENTURY-FOX, 02/16/1956)

- 1. "Soliloquy" (Outtake) - (Hammerstein, Rodgers) - 8:25

^{(rec. 02/23/55, Frank Sinatra, Orchestra, Richard Jones)}

From "The Man with the Golden Arm" (UNITED ARTISTS, 01/1956)

- 2. "The Man With the Golden Arm" - (Cahn, Van Heusen) - 3:23

^{(rec. 10/31/55, Frank Sinatra, Orchestra, Nelson Riddle)}

From "Johnny Concho" (UNITED ARTISTS, 07/1956)

- 3. Johnny Concho Theme : "Wait For Me" - (Nelson Riddle, Dok Stanford) - 2:52

^{(rec. 04/05/56, Frank Sinatra, Loulie Jean Norman, Orchestra, Nelson Riddle)}

From "High Society" (MGM, 07/17/1956)

- 4. Promotional Spots for "High Society" - 1:16

^{(rec. 1956, Frank Sinatra, Bing Crosby)}

- 5. "Who Wants to Be a Millionaire?" (Alt. Mix) - (Porter) - 2:01

^{(rec. 01/20/56, Frank Sinatra, Celeste Holm, The M-G-M Studio Orchestra, Johnny W. Green)}

- 6. "You're Sensational" - (Porter) - 3:09

^{(rec. 01/20/56, Frank Sinatra, The M-G-M Studio Orchestra, Johnny W. Green)}

- 7. "Well, Did You Evah!" (Ft. Bing Crosby) (Alt. Mix) - (Porter) - 3:39

^{(rec. 01/17/56, Frank Sinatra, Bing Crosby, The M-G-M Studio Orchestra, Johnny W. Green)}

- 8. "Mind if I Make Love to You?" (Alt. Mix) - (Porter) - 2:17

^{(rec. 01/20/56, Frank Sinatra, The M-G-M Studio Orchestra, Johnny W. Green)}

From "The Joker is Wild" (PARAMOUNT, 10/1957)

- 9. "All the Way" (Version 1) - (Cahn, Van Heusen) - 2:05

^{(rec. 10/03/56, Frank Sinatra, The Paramount Studio Orchestra, Walter Scharf)}

- 10. "I Cried for You (Now It's Your Turn to Cry Over Me)" - (Gus Arnheim, Arthur Freed, Abe Lyman) - 1:35

^{(rec. 10/03/56, Frank Sinatra, The Paramount Studio Orchestra, Walter Scharf)}

- 11. "If I Could Be With You (One Hour Tonight)" - (Henry Creamer, Turner Layton) - 1:17

^{(rec. 10/03/56, Frank Sinatra, The Paramount Studio Orchestra, Walter Scharf)}

- 12. "At Sundown" - (Walter Donaldson) - 1:44

^{(rec. 10/03/56, Frank Sinatra, The Paramount Studio Orchestra, Walter Scharf)}

- 13. "All the Way" (Version 2) - (Cahn, Van Heusen) - 2:09

^{(rec. 10/03/56, Frank Sinatra, The Paramount Studio Orchestra, Walter Scharf)}

- 14. Medley: "Out of Nowhere"/"Swingin' on a Star" - (Johnny Green, Heyman)/(Johnny Burke, Van Heusen) - 1:45

^{(rec. 11/19/56 & 11/20/56, Frank Sinatra, The Paramount Studio Orchestra, Walter Scharf)}

- 15. Medley: "Naturally"/"Ah, So Pure"/"Naturally" - (Harry Barris, Joseph McCarthy, Friedrich Van Flotow) - 1:56

^{(rec. 11/19/56 & 11/20/56, Frank Sinatra, The Paramount Studio Orchestra, Walter Scharf)}

- 16. "All the Way" (Parody) - (Cahn, Van Heusen) - 1:09

^{(rec. 11/19/56 & 11/20/56, Frank Sinatra, The Paramount Studio Orchestra, Walter Scharf)}

- 17. "Chicago (That Toddlin' Town)" (Capitol Records master) - (Fred Fisher) - 2:13

^{(rec. 08/13/57, Frank Sinatra, Orchestra, Nelson Riddle)}

From "Pal Joey" (COLUMBIA, 10/25/1957)

- 18. Promotional Spots for "Pal Joey" (Kim Novak, Frank Sinatra) - 0:49

^{(rec. 1957, Frank Sinatra, Kim Novak)}

- 19. "I Didn't Know What Time It Was" - (Rodgers, Lorenz Hart) - 2:47

^{(rec. 05/23/57, Frank Sinatra, The Columbia Pictures Orchestra, Morris Stoloff)}

- 20. "There's a Small Hotel" - (Rodgers, Hart) - 2:16

^{(rec. 06/14/57, Frank Sinatra, The Columbia Pictures Orchestra, Morris Stoloff)}

- 21. "I Could Write a Book" - (Rodgers, Hart) - 2:17

^{(rec. 06/14/57, Frank Sinatra, Trudy Erwin, The Columbia Pictures Orchestra, Morris Stoloff)}

- 22. "The Lady is a Tramp" - (Rodgers, Hart) - 3:14

^{(rec. 05/23/57, Frank Sinatra, The Columbia Pictures Orchestra, Morris Stoloff)}

- 23. "Bewitched, Bothered and Bewildered" (Capitol Records master) - (Rodgers, Hart) - 3:39

^{(rec. 08/13/57, Frank Sinatra, Orchestra, Nelson Riddle)}

- 24. Finale: "Dream Sequence"/"What Do I Care for a Dame?"/"I Could Write a Book" - (George Duning) (Rodgers, Hart) - 5:57

^{(rec. 09/25/57, Frank Sinatra, The Columbia Pictures Orchestra, Morris Stoloff)}

=== Disc six ===
From "Kings Go Forth" (UNITED ARTISTS, 07/1958)

- 1. "Monique" (Capitol Records master) - (Bernstein, Cahn) - 3:17

^{(rec. 05/29/58, Frank Sinatra, Orchestra, Felix Slatkin)}

From "Some Came Running" (MGM 12/18/1958)

- 2. "To Love and Be Loved" (Capitol Records master) - (Cahn, Van Heusen) - 2:58

^{(rec. 10/15/58, Frank Sinatra, Orchestra, Nelson Riddle)}

From "A Hole in the Head" (UNITED ARTISTS, 07/15/1959)

- 3. Promotional Spots for "A Hole in the Head" - 1:47

^{(rec. 1959, Frank Sinatra)}

- 4. "All My Tomorrows" (Capitol Records master) - (Cahn, Van Heusen) - 3:14

^{(rec. 12/29/58, Frank Sinatra, Orchestra, Nelson Riddle)}

- 5. "High Hopes" (Ft. Eddie Hodges) - (Cahn, Van Heusen) - 2:11

^{(rec. 02/12/59, Frank Sinatra, Eddie Hodges, Orchestra, Nelson Riddle)}

From "Can-Can" (20th CENTURY-FOX, 03/09/1960)

- 6. Main Title: "Can-Can/Montmart’" - (Porter) 3:02

^{(rec. 09/01/59, Frank Sinatra, Maurice Chevalier, 20TH Century Fox Chorus, 20TH Century Fox Studio Orchestra, Nelson Riddle)}

- 7. "I Love Paris" (full length version/outtake) - (Porter) 3:40

^{(rec. 10/13/59, Frank Sinatra, Maurice Chevalier, 20TH Century Fox Studio Orchestra, Nelson Riddle)}

- 8. "C'est Magnifique" - (Porter) - 2:01

^{(rec. 08/27/59, Frank Sinatra, 20TH Century Fox Studio Orchestra, Nelson Riddle)}

- 9. "Let's Do It (Let's Fall in Love)" (Ft. Shirley MacLaine) - (Porter) - 2:48

^{(rec. 09/22/59, Frank Sinatra, Shirley MacLaine, 20TH Century Fox Studio Orchestra, Nelson Riddle)}

- 10. "It's All Right With Me" - (Porter) - 4:16

^{(rec. 08/27/59, Frank Sinatra, 20TH Century Fox Studio Orchestra, Nelson Riddle)}

From "Advise and Consent" (COLUMBIA, 06/06/1962)

- 11. "Heart of Mine" (Alt. Mix, w/Orchestra) - (Jerry Fielding, Ned Washington) - 2:18

^{(rec. 09/18/61, Frank Sinatra, The Columbia Pictures Orchestra, Jerry Fielding)}

From "Come Blow Your Horn" (PARAMOUNT, 06/05/1963)

- 12. Promotional Spot for "Come Blow Your Horn" 0:58

^{(rec. 1963, Frank Sinatra)}

- 13. "Come Blow Your Horn" (Cahn, Van Heusen) 4:51

^{(rec. 10/25/62, Frank Sinatra, The Paramount Studio Orchestra, Nelson Riddle)}

From "The Victors" (COLUMBIA 12/1963)

- 14. "Have Yourself a Merry Little Christmas" - (Ralph Blane, Hugh Martin) - 3:32

^{(rec. 07/16/63, Frank Sinatra, The Wally Stott Chorus, The Wally Stott Orchestra, The Columbia Pictures Orchestra, Gus Levene)}

From "Paris When It Sizzles" (PARAMOUNT, 04/1964)

- 15. "The Girl Who Stole the Eiffel Tower" - (Richard Quine, Riddle) - 1:38

^{(rec. 03/13/63, Frank Sinatra, William Holden (Narration), The Paramount Studio Orchestra, Nelson Riddle)}

From "Robin and the 7 Hoods" (WARNER BROS., 06/24/1964)

- 16. "My Kind of Town (Chicago Is)" - (Cahn, Van Heusen) - 2:58

^{(rec. 11/13/63, Frank Sinatra, The Warner Bros. Studio Orchestra, Nelson Riddle)}

- 17. "I Like to Lead When I Dance" (Reprise Records master) - (Cahn, Van Heusen) - 4:08

^{(rec. 04/08/64, Frank Sinatra, The Warner Bros. Studio Orchestra, Nelson Riddle)}

- 18. "Mister Booze" (Reprise Records master) - (Cahn, Van Heusen) - 5:17

^{(rec. 04/10/64, Frank Sinatra, Bing Crosby, Dean Martin, Sammy Davis Jr., The Warner Bros. Studio Chorus, The Warner Bros. Studio Orchestra, Nelson Riddle)}

- 19. "Style" (Alt. Mix) - (Cahn, Van Heusen) - 4:29

^{(rec. 12/03/63, Frank Sinatra, Dean Martin, Bing Crosby, The Warner Bros. Studio Orchestra, Nelson Riddle)}

- 20. Finale : "Don't Be a Do-Badder" - (Cahn, Van Heusen) - 1:11

^{(rec. 10/18/63, Frank Sinatra, Dean Martin, Sammy Davis Jr., The Warner Bros. Studio Orchestra, Nelson Riddle)}

- 21. Bonus : "Don't Be a Do-Badder" (Vocal Tracking Session) - (Cahn, Van Heusen) - 5:28

^{(rec. 10/18/63, Frank Sinatra, Dean Martin, Sammy Davis Jr., The Warner Bros. Studio Orchestra, Nelson Riddle)}

== Credits ==
Produced by Charles L. Granata & Didier C. Deutsch.

Grammy-Nominated Liner Notes by Will Friedwald, with Granata, Deutsch, Leonard Maltin and Scott Allen Nollen.
