= The Columbia Years 1943–1952: The V-Discs =

Compilation album by Frank Sinatra
- Released: 1994 (box); June 16, 1998 (jewel)
- Recorded: 1943–1945
- Genre: Traditional pop
- Length: 145:12
- Label: Columbia

Frank Sinatra chronology
Duets (1993)	The Columbia Years 1943–1952: The V-Discs (1994)	Sinatra Saga (1994)

Professional ratings
Review scores
Source	Rating
AllMusic	3/5 stars

The Columbia Years 1943–1952: The V-Discs is a 1994 compilation album by the American singer Frank Sinatra. It was released as a "long box" box set in 1994 and re-released in a jewel box size in 1998.

The two-CD set contains recordings from V-Discs that were sent to troops during World War II. The V-Discs were the only recordings that the musician's union allowed Sinatra to record during the session musicians strike between 1942 and 1944 and he took full advantage, knowing that although the records would not be sold, it would keep him in the public ear, and allow him to perfect his technique.

Although a heavy set, it does not contain every V-disc Sinatra recorded. A more complete set did not become available until 2003 with the release of The Real Complete Columbia Years V-Discs.

== Track listing ==
=== Disc one ===
No.	Title	Writer(s)	Length
1.	"I Only Have Eyes for You"	Harry Warren, Al Dubin	3:43
2.	"Kiss Me Again"	Victor Herbert, Henry Blossom	2:39
3.	"(There'll Be A) Hot Time in the Town of Berlin"	Joe Bushkin, John DeVries	2:26
4.	"The Music Stopped"	Jimmy McHugh, Harold Adamson	2:56
5.	"I Couldn't Sleep a Wink Last Night"	McHugh, Adamson	2:58
6.	"The Way You Look Tonight"	Jerome Kern, Dorothy Fields	2:38
7.	"I'll Be Around"	Alec Wilder	1:38
8.	"You've Got a Hold On Me"	Frederick Loewe, Alan Jay Lerner	2:30
9.	"A Lovely Way to Spend an Evening"	McHugh, Adamson	3:07
10.	"(I Got a Woman Crazy For Me) She's Funny That Way"	Neil Moret, Richard A. Whiting	2:11
11.	"Speak Low"	Kurt Weill, Ogden Nash	2:18
12.	"Close to You"	Al Hoffman, Jerry Livingston, Carl Lampl	3:11
13.	"My Shining Hour"	Harold Arlen, Johnny Mercer	2:23
14.	"Long Ago and Far Away"	Jerome Kern, Ira Gershwin	2:43
15.	"Some Other Time"	Jule Styne, Sammy Cahn	2:34
16.	"Come Out, Come Out, Wherever You Are"	Styne, Cahn	2:00
17.	"Put Your Dreams Away (For Another Day)"	Ruth Lowe, Paul Mann, Stephen Weiss	1:27
18.	"And Then You Kissed Me"	Styne, Cahn	3:03
19.	"All the Things You Are"	Kern, Oscar Hammerstein II	2:50
20.	"All of Me"	Gerald Marks, Seymour Simons	1:39
21.	"Nancy (With the Laughing Face)"	Jimmy Van Heusen, Phil Silvers	3:37
22.	"Mighty Lak' a Rose"	Ethelbert Nevin, Frank Lebby Stanton	3:42
23.	"Falling in Love with Love"	Richard Rodgers, Lorenz Hart	2:37
24.	"Cradle Song (Brahms' Lullaby)"	Johannes Brahms	2:45
25.	"I'll Follow My Secret Heart"	Noël Coward	2:36
26.	"There's No You"	Hal Hopper, Tom Adair	2:41
27.	"Someone to Watch Over Me"	George Gershwin, Ira Gershwin	2:08
Total length:			71:00

=== Disc two ===
No.	Title	Writer(s)	Length
1.	"Let Me Love You Tonight"	Mitchell Parish, Rene Touzet	2:40
2.	"Just Close Your Eyes"	Jack Elliott, Sam Mineo, Lewis Rodgers	1:36
3.	"If You Are But a Dream" (previously unreleased)	Moe Jaffe, Jack Fulton, Nat Bonx	3:43
4.	"Strange Music" (previously unreleased)	Edvard Grieg, adapted by Robert Wright, George Forrest	3:25
5.	"Cradle Song (Brahms' Lullaby)" (previously unreleased)	Brahms	2:35
6.	"Dick Haymes, Dick Todd and Como" (previously unreleased)	Van Heusen, Johnny Burke, Cahn	2:38
7.	"None But the Lonely Heart"	Tchaikovsky, Bill Westbrook	3:26
8.	"Ol' Man River"	Kern, Hammerstein	4:10
9.	"Homesick, That's All"	Gordon Jenkins	3:12
10.	"The Night is Young and You're So Beautiful"	Dana Suesse, Irving Kahal, Billy Rose	2:09
11.	"Aren't You Glad You're You"	Van Heusen, Burke	2:05
12.	"You Brought a New Kind of Love to Me"	Sammy Fain, Kahal, Pierre Norman Connor	1:35
13.	"I'll Never Smile Again"	Ruth Lowe	3:24
14.	"Without a Song"	Vincent Youmans, Rose, Edward Eliscu	2:19
15.	"Was the Last Time I Saw You (The Last Time)" (previously unreleased)	Edna Osser, Marjorie Goetschius	3:00
16.	"Don't Forget Tonight, Tomorrow" (previously unreleased)	Leo "Ukie" Sherin, Jay Milton	2:27
17.	"Oh! What it Seemed to Be"	Bennie Benjamin, George David Weiss, Frank Carle	2:55
18.	"Over the Rainbow"	Harold Arlen, E.Y. Harburg	3:15
19.	"Where is My Bess"	G. Gershwin, DuBose Heyward, I. Gershwin	3:06
20.	"My Romance"	Kern, Hammerstein	3:13
21.	"The Song is You"	Rodgers, Hart	3:34
22.	"I Fall in Love With You Ev'ry Day"	Sam H. Stept	1:45
23.	"They Say It's Wonderful"	Irving Berlin	2:36
24.	"You Are Too Beautiful"	Rodgers, Hart	2:52
25.	"Come Rain or Come Shine"	Arlen, Mercer	2:26
26.	"Stormy Weather"	Arlen, Ted Koehler	4:06
Total length:			74:12

== Personnel ==
- Frank Sinatra – vocals, all tracks
- The Bobby Tucker Singers – vocals, Disc 1 tracks 1, 6, & 12
- Raymond Paige and his orchestra – music, Disc 2 tracks 3–6
- The Pied Pipers (June Hutton, Hal Hopper, Chuck Lowry, Clark Yocum) – vocals, Disc 2 tracks 13 & 16
- Tommy Dorsey – trombone, "I'll Never Smile Again"
- Dinah Shore – vocal duet, Disc 2 tracks 10 & 20
- Axel Stordahl
  - Disc 1: arranger, all tracks except tracks 5 & 7; conductor, all tracks
  - Disc 2: arranger & conductor, tracks 1, 2, 7–12, 14–26
- Alec Wilder – arranger, Disc 1 tracks 5 & 7
