= Classic Duets =

Compilation album by Frank Sinatra
- Released: November 5, 2002
- Recorded: 1950s–1960s
- Genre: Traditional pop
- Length: 59:20
- Label: Capitol Records

Frank Sinatra chronology
Frank Sinatra in Hollywood 1940-1964 (2002)	Classic Duets (2002)	The Real Complete Columbia Years V-Discs (2003)

Professional ratings
Review scores
Source	Rating
AllMusic	link

Classic Duets is a 2002 compilation album by Frank Sinatra.

Given his enormous talent and unparalleled musical history—not to mention the healthy, suffer-no-fools ego they inspired—it is hardly surprising that duets are relatively few and far between in Frank Sinatra's catalog, his smash duet on "Somethin' Stupid" with daughter Nancy notwithstanding. But in the heyday of the TV variety show, the star-hosted format virtually demanded musical cross-pollination, a tradition that carried over from radio. It's that fertile, largely unexplored territory that this rewarding, 21-track anthology explores in conjunction with the PBS special of the same name.

== Track listing ==
1. "The Birth of the Blues" (Ray Henderson, Buddy G. DeSylva, Lew Brown) (with Louis Armstrong) - 3:23
2. "I'll Never Smile Again" (Ruth Lowe) (with The Hi-Lo's) - 2:10
3. "Can't We Be Friends?" (Paul James, Kay Swift) (with Ella Fitzgerald) - 3:04
4. Medley: "You Make Me Feel So Young"/"Them There Eyes"/"A Foggy Day"/"I've Got You Under My Skin"/"Taking a Chance on Love"/"They Can't Take That Away From Me"/"All of Me"/"Daddy"/"I Can't Give You Anything but Love, Baby"/"You Must Have Been a Beautiful Baby" (Josef Myrow, Mack Gordon)/(Maceo Pinkard, Doris Tauber, William Tracey)/(George Gershwin, Ira Gershwin)/(Cole Porter)/(Vernon Duke, John La Touche, Ted Fetter)/(G. Gershwin, I. Gershwin)/(Gerald Marks, Seymour Simons)/(Bob Troup)/(Jimmy McHugh, Dorothy Fields)/(Harry Warren, Johnny Mercer) (with Dinah Shore) - 5:50
5. "Nice Work If You Can Get It" (G. Gershwin, I. Gershwin) (with Peggy Lee) - 2:31
6. "Side by Side" (Gus Kahn, Harry M. Woods) (with the Tri-Tones) - 2:14
7. "Something's Gotta Give" (Mercer) (with the McGuire Sisters) - 2:16
8. "If I Loved You" (Richard Rodgers, Oscar Hammerstein II) (with Shirley Jones) - 3:26
9. "Together (Wherever We Go)" (Jule Styne, Stephen Sondheim) (with Dean Martin and Bing Crosby) - 3:44
10. "High Hopes" (Sammy Cahn, Jimmy Van Heusen) (with the Kids) - 2:43
11. Medley: "Sunday, Monday or Always"/"On a Slow Boat to China"/"Saturday Night (Is the Loneliest Night of the Week)"/"Memories Are Made of This"/"The Girl That I Marry"/"Innamorata"/"I've Got a Crush on You"/"Oh, Marie"/"Don't Cry, Joe (Let Her Go, Let Her Go, Let Her Go)" (Van Heusen, Johnny Burke)/(Frank Loesser)/(Cahn, Jule Styne)/(Terry Gilkyson, Richard Dehr, Frank Miller)/(Irving Berlin)/(Warren, Jack Brooks)/(G. Gershwin, I. Gershwin)/(Eduardo di Capua)/(Joe Marsala) (with Dean Martin) - 4:49
12. "Me and My Shadow" (Al Jolson, Billy Rose, Dave Dreyer) (with Sammy Davis Jr.) - 2:38
13. "September Song" (Kurt Weill, Maxwell Anderson) (with Bing Crosby) - 1:57
14. "You're the Top" (Porter) (with Ethel Merman) - 1:39
15. "I Can't Believe That You're in Love with Me" (Clarence Gaskill, McHugh) (with Louis Prima and Keely Smith) - 1:05
16. Harold Arlen Medley: "As Long as I Live"/"It's Only a Paper Moon"/"One for My Baby (and One More for the Road)"/"Ac-Cent-Tchu-Ate the Positive"/"Stormy Weather"/"Get Happy"/"Between the Devil and the Deep Blue Sea" (Harold Arlen, Ted Koehler)/(Arlen, E.Y. Harburg, Rose)/(Arlen, Mercer)/(Arlen, Mercer)/(Arlen, Koehler)/(Arlen, Koehler) (with Lena Horne) - 3:59
17. "You Make Me Feel So Young (Old)" (with Nancy Sinatra) - 1:55
18. Medley: "Witchcraft"/"Love Me Tender" + Reprise (Cy Coleman, Carolyn Leigh)/(George R. Poulton, Ken Darby) (with Elvis Presley) - 2:15
19. "Love Is Here to Stay" (G. Gershwin, I. Gershwin) (with Peggy Lee) - 2:22
20. Medley: "Moonlight in Vermont"/"I May Be Wrong" (Jack Blackburn, Karl Suessdorf)/(Harry Ruskin) (with Ella Fitzgerald) - 4:33
21. "Put Your Dreams Away (For Another Day)" (Lowe, Paul Mann, Stephen Weiss) (with Ella Fitzgerald) - 0:44
