= Classic Sinatra: His Greatest Performances 1953–1960 =

Classic Sinatra: His Great Performances 1953–1960

Compilation album by Frank Sinatra
- Released: March 28, 2000
- Recorded: 1953–1960
- Genre: Traditional pop; jazz
- Length: 59:40
- Label: Capitol

Frank Sinatra chronology
Sinatra '57 in Concert (1999)	Classic Sinatra: His Great Performances 1953–1960 (2000)	Super Hits (2000)

Professional ratings
Review scores
Source	Rating
AllMusic	4.5/5 stars

Classic Sinatra: His Great Performances 1953–1960 is a 2000 compilation album by Frank Sinatra, containing twenty tracks he recorded for Capitol Records.

== Track listing ==
1. "I've Got the World on a String" (Harold Arlen, Ted Koehler) - 2:10
2. "I Get a Kick Out of You" (Cole Porter) - 2:54
3. "They Can't Take That Away from Me" (George Gershwin, Ira Gershwin) - 1:58
4. "My Funny Valentine" (Richard Rodgers, Lorenz Hart) - 2:31
5. "Young at Heart" (Carolyn Leigh, Johnny Richards) - 2:51
6. "Someone to Watch Over Me" (G. Gershwin, I. Gershwin) - 2:56
7. "In the Wee Small Hours of the Morning" (David Mann, Bob Hilliard) - 3:01
8. "I've Got You Under My Skin" (Porter) - 3:43
9. "You Make Me Feel So Young" (Josef Myrow, Mack Gordon) - 2:56
10. "It Happened in Monterey" (Mabel Wayne, Billy Rose) - 2:36
11. "Oh! Look at Me Now" (Joe Bushkin, John DeVries) - 2:49
12. "Night and Day" (Porter) - 4:00
13. "Witchcraft" (Cy Coleman, Leigh) - 2:53
14. "The Lady Is a Tramp" (Rodgers, Hart) - 3:16
15. "All the Way" (Sammy Cahn, Jimmy Van Heusen) - 2:53
16. "Come Fly with Me" (Cahn, Van Heusen) - 3:18
17. "Put Your Dreams Away (For Another Day)" (Paul Mann, Stephan Weiss, Ruth Lowe) - 3:13
18. "One for My Baby (and One More for the Road)" (Arlen, Johnny Mercer) - 4:26
19. "Come Dance with Me" (Cahn, Van Heusen) - 2:31
20. "Nice 'N' Easy" (Alan Bergman, Marilyn Bergman, Lew Spence) - 2:44

== Personnel ==
- Frank Sinatra - vocals
- Nelson Riddle - arranger, conductor
- Billy May
- Bill Miller - pianist

== Certifications ==
Region	Certification	Certified units/sales
United Kingdom (BPI)	Gold	100,000^{^}
United States (RIAA)	2× Platinum	2,000,000^{^}
^{^} Shipments figures based on certification alone.
