= Sinatra '57 in Concert =

Live album by Frank Sinatra
- Released: April 6, 1999
- Recorded: June 9, 1957
- Genres: Vocal jazz; traditional pop
- Length: 56:07
- Label: Artanis

Frank Sinatra chronology
Lucky Numbers (1998)	Sinatra '57 in Concert (1999)	Classic Sinatra: His Greatest Performances 1953-1960 (2000)

Professional ratings
Review scores
Source	Rating
AllMusic	4/5 stars
Christgau's Consumer Guide	A−

Sinatra '57 in Concert is a 1999 live album by the American singer Frank Sinatra. It is a complete recording of a concert performed at the Seattle Civic Auditorium on June 9, 1957. Arranger Nelson Riddle conducted the 26-piece orchestra at the event.

== Production history ==
The album was first released as a bootleg before being digitally remastered and officially released by Artanis Entertainment Group, based on a recording made by Wally Heider. The restored version was released on a 24-karat gold CD and "virgin vinyl" audiophile LP. Each numbered album included a 16-page pamphlet featuring an introduction by actor Kelsey Grammer and liner notes penned by Will Friedwald, the author of Sinatra: The Song is You.

== Track listing ==
The album contains 19 tracks:

1. Introduction - "You Make Me Feel So Young" (Mack Gordon, Josef Myrow) - 3:46
2. "It Happened in Monterey" (Billy Rose, Mabel Wayne) - 2:23
3. "At Long Last Love" (Cole Porter) - 2:15
4. "I Get a Kick Out of You" (Porter) - 2:49
5. "Just One of Those Things" (Porter) - 3:02
6. "A Foggy Day" (George Gershwin, Ira Gershwin) - 3:31
7. "The Lady is a Tramp" (Richard Rodgers, Lorenz Hart) - 3:18
8. "They Can't Take That Away from Me" (G. Gershwin, I. Gershwin) - 1:40
9. "I Won't Dance" (Dorothy Fields, Oscar Hammerstein II, Otto Harbach, Jimmy McHugh) - 3:26
10. Sinatra Dialogue - 4:52
11. "When Your Lover Has Gone" (Enir A. Swan) - 2:53
12. "Violets for Your Furs" (Tom Adair, Matt Dennis) - 3:34
13. "My Funny Valentine" (Rodgers, Hart) - 2:44
14. "Glad to Be Unhappy" (Rodgers, Hart) - 1:37
15. "One for My Baby (and One More for the Road)" (Harold Arlen, Johnny Mercer) - 4:01
16. "(Love Is) The Tender Trap" (Sammy Cahn, Jimmy Van Heusen) - 4:12
17. "Hey! Jealous Lover" (Cahn, Kay Twomey, Bee Walker) - 2:21
18. "I've Got You Under My Skin" (Porter) - 3:15
19. "Oh! Look at Me Now" (Joe Bushkin, John DeVries) - 3:12

== Personnel ==
- Frank Sinatra – vocals
- Nelson Riddle – conductor
- Bill Miller – piano
- Al Viola – guitar
- Irving Cottler – drums
