= A Swingin' Affair! =

Studio album by Frank Sinatra
- Released: May 6, 1957
- Recorded: November 15 – 28, 1956
- Studio: Capitol Studio A (Hollywood)
- Genres: Vocal jazz, traditional pop
- Length: 45:31 (original 15-track album)
- Label: Capitol
- Producer: Voyle Gilmore

Frank Sinatra chronology
Close to You (1957)	A Swingin' Affair! (1957)	Where Are You? (1957)

Professional ratings
Review scores
Source	Rating
Allmusic	5/5 stars
Encyclopedia of Popular Music	5/5 stars
Uncut	5/5 stars

A Swingin' Affair! is the twelfth studio album by Frank Sinatra. It is sometimes mentioned as the sequel to Songs for Swingin' Lovers.

"The Lady Is a Tramp" was bumped from the original album and replaced with "No One Ever Tells You", which had been recorded months earlier. Later, "The Lady is a Tramp" appeared on the soundtrack for Pal Joey. It was restored to the album for the compact disc release.

== Track listing ==
1. "Night and Day" (Cole Porter) – 3:58
2. "I Wish I Were in Love Again" (Richard Rodgers, Lorenz Hart) – 2:27
3. "I Got Plenty o' Nuttin'" (DuBose Heyward, George Gershwin, Ira Gershwin) – 3:09
4. "I Guess I'll Have to Change My Plan" (Arthur Schwartz, Howard Dietz) – 2:23
5. "Nice Work If You Can Get It" (G. Gershwin, I. Gershwin) – 2:20
6. "Stars Fell on Alabama" (Frank Perkins, Mitchell Parish) – 2:37
7. "No One Ever Tells You" (Hub Atwood, Carroll Coates) – 3:23
8. "I Won't Dance" (Jerome Kern, Jimmy McHugh, Oscar Hammerstein II, Otto Harbach, Dorothy Fields) – 3:21
9. "The Lonesome Road" (Nat Shilkret, Gene Austin) – 3:53
10. "At Long Last Love" (Porter) – 2:23
11. "You'd Be So Nice to Come Home To" (Porter) – 2:03
12. "I Got It Bad (And That Ain't Good)" (Duke Ellington, Paul Francis Webster) – 3:21
13. "From This Moment On" (Porter) – 3:50
14. "If I Had You" (Jimmy Campbell, Reginald Connelly, Ted Shapiro) – 2:35
15. "Oh! Look at Me Now" (Joe Bushkin, John DeVries) – 2:48
  CD reissue bonus track not included on the original 1957 release:
16. "The Lady Is a Tramp" (Rodgers, Hart) – 3:14

== Chart positions ==
Chart	Year	Peak position
UK Albums Chart	1957	1
