= Oh! Look at Me Now (album) =

Studio album LP by Bobby Darin
- Released: October 1962
- Recorded: 1962
- Genre: Vocal pop
- Length: 31:38
- Label: Capitol
- Producer: Tom Morgan

Bobby Darin chronology
Things and Other Things (1962)	Oh! Look at Me Now (1962)	You're the Reason I'm Living (1963)

Oh! Look at Me Now is a studio album by the American singer Bobby Darin, released in October 1962 by Capitol, his first for the label. and arranged by Billy May. The album features a collection of old standards arranged with an upbeat, contemporary sound.

The album debuted on the Billboard Top LPs chart in the issue dated November 17, 1962, and remained on the chart for six weeks, peaking at number 100.

The album was released on compact disc by EMI on December 11, 2001, paired with Darin's 1964 album From Hello Dolly to Goodbye Charlie. Eight of the 12 songs were released as part of the 1995 CD Spotlight on Bobby Darin. Oh! Look at Me Now was included in a box set entitled Four Classic Albums Plus Box Set, which contains 3 of his studio albums, 1 compilation, and was released on July 1, 2016.

== Reception ==
Professional ratings
Review scores
Source	Rating
AllMusic	3/5 stars
New Record Mirror	4/5 stars
The Encyclopedia of Popular Music	3/5 stars
Disc	3/5 stars

In his Allmusic review, critic JT Griffith wrote "The classic Billy May arrangements make the album one of Darin's most swinging albums and a surefire favorite with fans who have discovered him from the Swingers soundtrack."

Billboard believed "The fine Billy May arrangements, employing mainly strings on the softies and swinging brass on the upbeaters, is most reminiscent of Sinatra and the selection of standard tunes"

Cashbox in its Popular Picks of the Week Reviews stated that "Billy May has come up with some first-rate backings for the distinctive Darin sound"

New Record Mirror noted "Magnificent maestro Billy May takes credit for the romping arrangements and just how he manages to maintain such a high standards"

Hunter Nigel of Disc mentions that the album "features a fairish bunch of standards"

Variety noted that Darin "has a strong swinging vocal beat on the uptempo numbers and a pleasing mellow sound on the softer ballad items"

American Record Guide describes the album as "an above-average one" and noted "Whatever his true personality, he is certainly poised and sure, and this is evident in his singing-which is good"

In The Show I'll Never Forget, Sean Manning describes the album as "a wonderful Sinatra-school album.

== Track listing ==
No.	Title	Writer(s)	Length
1.	"All by Myself"	Irving Berlin	3:05
2.	"My Buddy"	Walter Donaldson; Gus Kahn	2:34
3.	"There's a Rainbow 'Round My Shoulder"	Al Jolson; Dave Dreyer; Billy Rose	2:40
4.	"Roses of Picardy"	Frederic Weatherly; Haydn Wood	2:11
5.	"You'll Never Know"	Harry Warren; Mack Gordon	2:55
6.	"Blue Skies"	Irving Berlin	2:32
7.	"Always"	Irving Berlin	2:21
8.	"You Made Me Love You"	James V. Monaco; Joseph McCarthy	2:51
9.	"A Nightingale Sang in Berkeley Square"	Eric Maschwitz; Manning Sherwin	3:02
10.	"I'm Beginning to See the Light"	Duke Ellington; Don George; Johnny Hodges; Harry James	2:18
11.	"Oh! Look at Me Now"	Joe Bushkin; John DeVries	2:43
12.	"The Party's Over"	Jule Styne; Betty Comden; Adolph Green	2:26
Total length:			31:38

== Charts ==
Chart peaks for Oh! Look at Me Now
Chart (1962)	Peak position
U.S. Top LPs (Billboard)	100

== Personnel ==
- Bobby Darin – vocals
- Billy May – arranger, conductor
- Tom Morgan – producer
