= All That Jazz (Ella Fitzgerald album) =

Studio album by Ella Fitzgerald
- Released: 1990
- Recorded: March 15–16, 20–22, 1989, Group IV Studios, Hollywood
- Genre: Jazz
- Length: 60:47
- Label: Pablo
- Producer: Norman Granz

Ella Fitzgerald chronology
Easy Living (1986)	All That Jazz (1990)

Professional ratings
Review scores
Source	Rating
AllMusic	1/5 stars
The Penguin Guide to Jazz Recordings	2/4 stars

All That Jazz was the final studio album by vocalist Ella Fitzgerald, released in 1990. Fitzgerald's performance on this album won her the Grammy Award for Best Jazz Vocal Performance, Female, at the 33rd Grammy Awards.

Reviewing the album in The New York Times, music critic Stephen Holden wrote, "Although the voice of the first lady of song has lost much of its heavenly sweetness, the years have not seriously undermined many of her other qualities, most particularly her rhythmic acuity."

== Track listing ==
For the 1992 Pablo CD Issue, PACD-2310-938-2

1. "Dream a Little Dream of Me" (Milton Adolphus, Gus Kahn) – 5:00
2. "My Last Affair" (Haven Johnson) – 4:34
3. "Baby, Don't You Quit Now" (Johnny Mercer, Jimmy Rowles) – 5:09
4. "Oh! Look at Me Now" (Joe Bushkin, John DeVries) – 5:10
5. "Jersey Bounce" (Tiny Bradshaw, Buddy Feyne, Edward Johnson, Bobby Plate) – 3:44
6. "When Your Lover Has Gone" (Einar Aaron Swan) – 5:00
7. "That Old Devil Called Love" (Doris Fisher, Allan Roberts) – 4:49
8. "All That Jazz" (Benny Carter, Al Stillman) – 4:04
9. "Just When We're Falling in Love" (Robbins' Nest) (Illinois Jacquet, Bob Russell, Lucky Thompson) – 5:24
10. "Good Morning Heartache" (Ervin Drake, Dan Fisher, Irene Higginbotham) – 5:28
11. "Little Jazz" (Roy Eldridge, Buster Harding) – 5:37
12. "The Nearness of You" (Hoagy Carmichael, Ned Washington) – 7:09

== Personnel ==
- Ella Fitzgerald – vocals
- Kenny Barron – piano
- Mike Wofford – piano
- Ray Brown – double bass
- Benny Carter – alto saxophone
- Harry "Sweets" Edison – trumpet
- Clark Terry – trumpet
- Al Grey – trombone
- Bobby Durham – drums
- Angel Balestier – engineer
- Kevin Welsh - 2nd engineer
