= Super Hits (Frank Sinatra album) =

Compilation album by Frank Sinatra
- Released: August 22, 2000
- Recorded: 1944–1951
- Genre: Traditional pop; jazz
- Length: 30:03
- Label: Sony

Frank Sinatra chronology
Classic Sinatra: His Greatest Performances 1953–1960 (2000)	Super Hits (2000)	Robin and the 7 Hoods (2000)

Professional ratings
Review scores
Source	Rating
AllMusic	3.5/5 stars

Super Hits is a 2000 compilation album by American singer Frank Sinatra.

== Track listing ==
1. "Begin the Beguine" (Cole Porter)
2. "Nancy (With the Laughing Face)" (Phil Silvers, Jimmy Van Heusen)
3. "The Coffee Song (They've Got An Awful Lot of Coffee In Brazil)" (Bob Hilliard, Dick Miles)
4. "One for My Baby (and One More for the Road)" (Harold Arlen, Johnny Mercer)
5. "Dream (When You're Feeling Blue)" (Mercer)
6. "Saturday Night (Is the Loneliest Night of the Week)" (Sammy Cahn, Jule Styne)
7. "Home on the Range" (Brewster M. Higley, Daniel E. Kelley)
8. "Nature Boy" (Eden Ahbez)
9. "Sunshine Cake" (Johnny Burke, Van Heusen)
10. "Castle Rock" [Single Version] (Ervin Drake, Al Sears, J. Shirl)

== Personnel ==
- Frank Sinatra – vocals
- Paula Kelly
- Harry James – trumpet
- Axel Stordahl – arranger, conductor
