= Sinatra Saga, Vol. 2 =

Live album by Frank Sinatra
- Released: 1994
- Recorded: May 29, 1975 – January 23, 1986
- Genre: Vocal jazz; traditional pop
- Label: Bravura Music

Frank Sinatra chronology
Sinatra Saga (1994)	Sinatra Saga, Vol. 2 (1994)	Sinatra & Sextet: Live in Paris (1994)

Sinatra Saga, Vol. 2 is a 1994 live album by American singer Frank Sinatra.

== Track listing ==
1. "I Sing the Songs (I Write the Songs)" (Bruce Johnston) - 3:20
  Recorded at the Westchester Premiere Theater, Tarrytown, New York, September 27, 1976
2. "The Best Is Yet To Come" (Cy Coleman, Carolyn Leigh) - 3:35
3. "Come Rain or Come Shine" (Harold Arlen, Johnny Mercer) - 3:25
  Recorded at the Metropolitan Center, Boston, Massachusetts, June 7, 1981
4. "Change Partners" (Irving Berlin) - 3:04
  Recorded at the Lloyd Norble Center, Norman, Oklahoma, January 23, 1986
5. "I Can't Get Started" (Vernon Duke, Ira Gershwin) - 4:11
  Recorded at the Resorts International, Atlantic City, New Jersey, November 24, 1979
6. "For Once in My Life" (Ron Miller, Orlando Murden) - 2:56
  Recorded at the Westchester Premiere Theater, Tarrytown, New York, September 26, 1976
7. "I See Your Face Before Me" (Howard Dietz, Arthur Schwartz) - 2:30
  Recorded at the Royal Albert Hall, London, England, May 29, 1975
8. "Just the Way You Are" (Billy Joel) - 3:21
  Recorded at the Resorts International, Atlantic City, New Jersey, November 21, 1979
9. "See the Show Again" (Barry Manilow) - 3:35
  Recorded at The Tonight Show, Burbank, California, November 14, 1977
10. "It's All Right with Me" (Cole Porter) - 2:58
  Recorded at the Lloyd Norble Center, Norman, Oklahoma, January 23, 1986
11. "For the Good Times" (Kris Kristofferson) - 5:09
  Recorded at the Resorts International, Atlantic City, New Jersey, November 25, 1979
12. "Pennies from Heaven" (Johnny Burke, Arthur Johnston) - 4:15
  Recorded at the Century Plaza Hotel, Los Angeles, California, May 19, 1981
13. "Empty Tables" (Mercer, Jimmy Van Heusen) - 4:38
14. "Never Gonna Fall in Love Again" (Eric Carmen) - 3:23
  Recorded at the Westchester Premiere Theater, Tarrytown, New York, September 26, 1976
15. "The Song Is You" (Jerome Kern, Oscar Hammerstein II) - 3:14
  Recorded at the Resorts International, Atlantic City, New Jersey, November 21, 1979
16. "Angel Eyes" (Matt Dennis, Earl Brent) - 3:28
  Recorded at the Metropolitan Center, Boston, Massachusetts, June 7, 1981
17. "They All Laughed" (George Gershwin, I. Gershwin) - 2:19
  Recorded at the Resorts International, Atlantic City, New Jersey, November 19, 1979
18. "You and Me (We Wanted It All)" (Peter Allen, Carole Bayer Sager) - 3:49
  Recorded at the Metropolitan Center, Boston, Massachusetts, June 7, 1981
19. "Here's to the Band" (Artie Schroeck, Sharman Howe, Alfred Nittoli) - 4:27
  Recorded at the Lloyd Norble Center, Norman, Oklahoma, January 23, 1986
20. "My Way" (Paul Anka, Claude Francois, Jacques Revaux, Gilles Thibaut) - 5:24
  Recorded at the Resorts International, Atlantic City, New Jersey, November 19, 1979
