= Sinatra Saga =

Live album by Frank Sinatra
- Released: 1994
- Recorded: 1953–1987
- Genre: Vocal jazz, traditional pop
- Length: 69 min.
- Label: Bravura Music

Frank Sinatra chronology
The Columbia Years 1943–1952: The V-Discs (1994)	Sinatra Saga (1994)	Sinatra Saga, Vol. 2 (1994)

Sinatra Saga is a live album by Frank Sinatra, containing 2 discs of him performing live on stage from the 1950s to the 1980s.

== Track listing ==
=== Disc one ===
1. "When You're Smiling" (Mark Fisher, Joe Goodwin, Larry Shay)
2. "Don't Worry 'bout Me" (Rube Bloom, Ted Koehler)
3. "The Birth of the Blues" (Buddy G. DeSylva, Lew Brown)
  Recorded at the Opera House Theater, Blackpool, England, July 26, 1953
4. "Three Coins in the Fountain" (Jule Styne, Sammy Cahn)
  Recorded at the Melbourne Town Hall, Melbourne, Australia, January 19, 1955
5. "You Make Me Feel So Young" (Josef Myrow, Mack Gordon)
6. "I Won't Dance" (Jerome Kern, Oscar Hammerstein, Otto Harbach)
7. "The Lady is a Tramp" (Richard Rodgers, Lorenz Hart)
  Recorded at the Seattle Civic Auditorium, Seattle, Washington, June 9, 1957
8. "Just One of Those Things" (Cole Porter)
9. "Dancing in the Dark" (Arthur Schwartz, Howard Dietz)
10. "Night and Day" (Porter)
  Recorded at the Melbourne Stadium, Melbourne, Australia, March 31, 1959
11. "My Funny Valentine" (Rodgers, Hart)
12. "In the Still of the Night" (Porter)
13. "April in Paris" (Vernon Duke, E.Y. Harburg)
14. "Too Marvelous for Words" (Richard A. Whiting, Johnny Mercer)
  Recorded at the Hibya Park, Tokyo, Japan, April 20, 1962
15. "Ol' Man River" (Kern, Hammerstein II)
  Recorded at the Theatre Manzoni, Milan, Italy, May 25, 1962
16. "I've Got You Under My Skin" (Porter)
17. "I Only Have Eyes for You" (Harry Warren, Al Dubin)
18. "Luck Be a Lady" (Frank Loesser)
  Recorded at the Kiel Opera House, St. Louis, Missouri, June 20, 1965
19. "I've Got You Under My Skin" (Ballad Version)
  Recorded at the Friends of the Liberty, February 12, 1967
20. "That's Life" (Kelly Gordon, Dean Thompson)
21. "Moonlight in Vermont" (Karl Suessdorf, John Blackburn)
  Recorded at the Oakland Coliseum, Oakland, California, May 22, 1968

=== Disc two ===
1. "All I Need is the Girl" (Stephen Sondheim, Styne)
2. "I Have Dreamed" (Rodgers, Hammerstein II)
  Recorded at the Oakland Coliseum, Oakland, California, May 22, 1968
3. "You Will Be My Music" (Joe Raposo)
4. "My Kind of Town" (Cahn, Jimmy Van Heusen)
5. "There Used to Be a Ballpark" (Raposo)
  Recorded at the Carnegie Hall, New York City, New York, April 8, 1974
6. "All By Myself" (Eric Carmen)
  Recorded at the Sabre Room, Hickory Hills, Illinois, May 13, 1976
7. "Maybe This Time" (Fred Ebb, John Kander)
  Recorded at the Caesar's Palace, Las Vegas, Nevada, May 5, 1978
8. "Lover, Come Back to Me" (Sigmund Romberg, Hammerstein II)
  Recorded at the Caesar's Palace, Las Vegas, Nevada, January 12, 1978
9. "It Had to Be You" (Isham Jones, Gus Kahn)
10. "Street of Dreams" (Victor Young, Sam M. Lewis)
11. Medley: "The Gal That Got Away"/"It Never Entered My Mind" (Harold Arlen, Ira Gershwin)/(Rodgers, Hart)
  Recorded at the Resorts International, Atlantic City, New Jersey, November 20, 1979
12. "When Joanna Loved Me" (Robert Wells, Jack Segal)
  Recorded at the Maksoud Plaza Hotel, São Paulo, Brazil, August 15, 1981
13. "Summer Wind" (Heinz Meyer, Hans Bradtke, Mercer)
  Recorded at the Golden Nugget, Las Vegas, Nevada, October 25, 1986
14. "Only One to a Customor" (Carolyn Leigh, Styne)
  Recorded at the Golden Nugget, Las Vegas, Nevada, December 27, 1986
15. "More Than You Know" (Billy Rose, Edward Eliscu, Vincent Youmans)
16. "Where or When" (Rodgers, Hart)
17. "Mack the Knife" (Marc Blitzstein, Bertold Brecht, Kurt Weill)
18. "Theme from New York, New York" (Ebb, Kander)
  Recorded at the Golden Nugget, Las Vegas, Nevada, October 25, 1986

== Personnel ==
- Frank Sinatra - vocals
- Bill Miller - pianist and conductor
- Vincent Falcone Jr. - conductor
- Al Viola - guitarist
- Irv Cottler - drums
