= Wiegenlied (Brahms) =

1868 song composed by Johannes Brahms

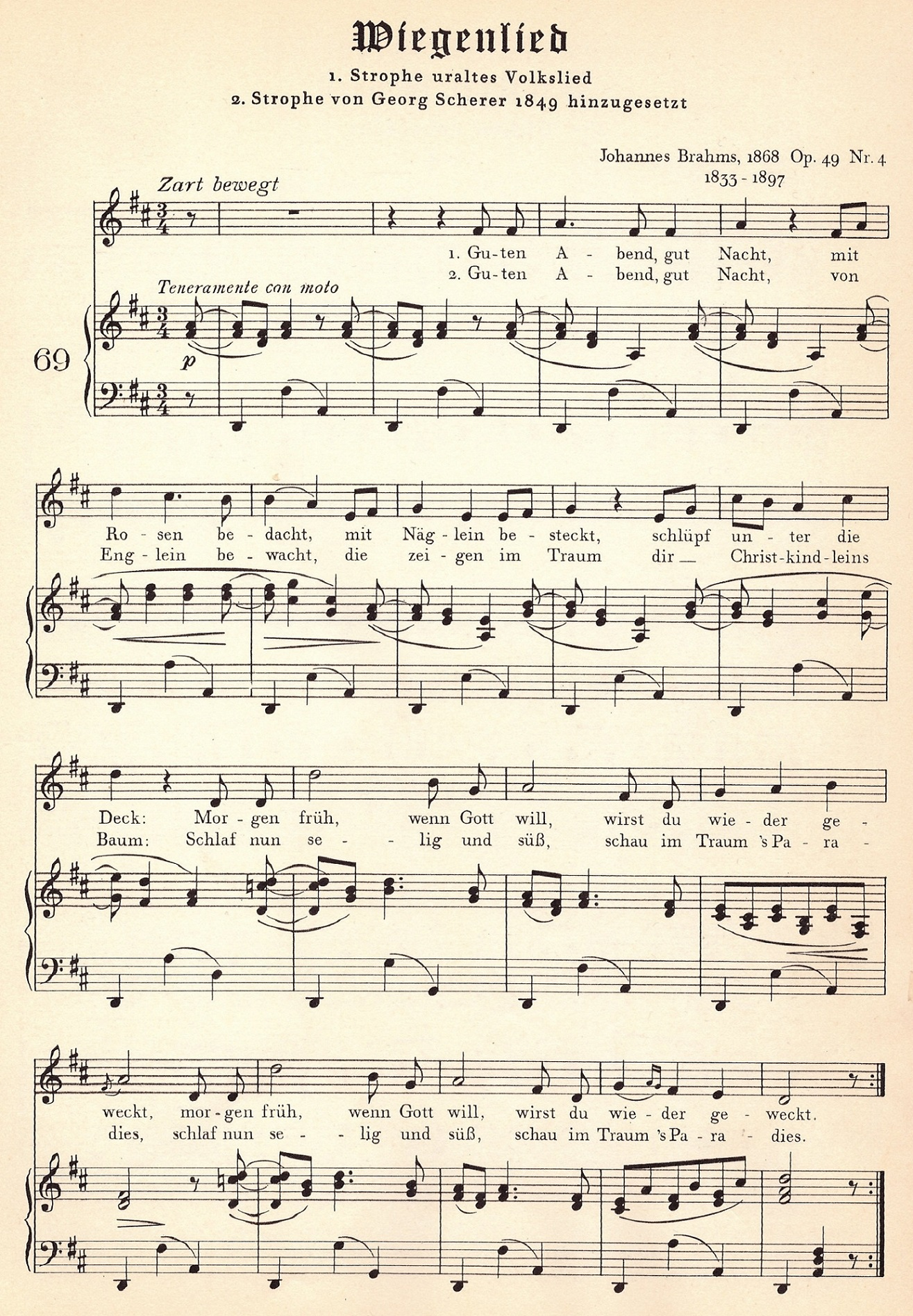

Song

"Wiegenlied", Op. 49, No. 4
Ernestine Schumann-Heink, singing with an orchestral accompaniment (1915)

"Wiegenlied" ("Lullaby"; "Cradle Song"), Op. 49, No. 4, is a lied for voice and piano by Johannes Brahms which was first published in 1868. It is one of the composer's most famous pieces.

== History ==
Brahms based the music of his "Wiegenlied" partially on "S'Is Anderscht", a duet by Alexander Baumann published in the 1840s. The cradle song was dedicated to Brahms's friend, Bertha Faber, on the occasion of the birth of her second son. Brahms had been in love with her in her youth and constructed the melody of the "Wiegenlied" to suggest, as a hidden counter-melody, a song she used to sing to him. Simrock published Brahms's Op. 49 in November 1868. The lullaby was first performed in public on 22 December 1869 in Vienna by Luise Dustmann (singer) and Clara Schumann (piano).

== Song ==
The song has been described as deceptively simple. In its original publication, it only had a single verse.

=== Lyrics ===
The lyrics are from Des Knaben Wunderhorn, a collection of German folk poems:

Guten Abend, gut' Nacht,
mit Rosen bedacht,
mit Näglein besteckt,
schlupf' unter die Deck':
Morgen früh, wenn Gott will,
wirst du wieder geweckt.

— First edition (1868)
Translation:

Good evening, good night,
With roses covered,
With cloves adorned,
Slip under the covers.
Tomorrow morning, if God wills,
you will wake once again.

Later, Brahms adapted a second verse from an 1849 poem by Georg Scherer:

Guten Abend, gut' Nacht,
von Englein bewacht,
die zeigen im Traum
dir Christkindleins Baum:
schlaf nun selig und süß,
schau im Traum 's Paradies.

— Georg Scherer (1849)
Translation:

Good evening, good night.
By angels watched,
Who show you in your dream
the Christ-child's tree.
Sleep now blissfully and sweetly,
see paradise in your dreams.

=== Melody ===
In 1877, Brahms based the second theme of the first movement of his Second Symphony on the lullaby's tune. The melody is first introduced in bar 82 and continues to develop throughout the movement.

== Reception ==
The "Wiegenlied" is one of Brahms's most popular songs.

=== Arrangements ===
"Guten Abend, gute Nacht"
Played on a music box

In 1922, Australian pianist and composer Percy Grainger arranged the "Wiegenlied" as one of his "Free Settings of Favorite Melodies" for solo piano. This study was characterized by much use of suspensions and arpeggiation, with the first statement of the melody placed in the tenor range of the keyboard. This last practice was a favorite one of Grainger.

=== Cultural references ===
A 1936 biographical film of Brahms with Albert Florath as the composer, took its title from the opening lines of this song, Guten Abend, gute Nacht.

Wendy Cope's poem "Brahms Cradle Song" refers to this song.

=== Cultural interpretations ===
In an article published in 2005, Karen Bottge analysed Brahms's "Wiegenlied" as an expression of the maternal voice, basing her reflections on writings by theorists such as Friedrich Kittler, Michel Chion, Gilles Deleuze, Félix Guattari, and Theodor W. Adorno.

=== Recordings ===
Recordings include:

- 1958 Joni James – recorded for her album Among My Souvenirs.
- 1962 Elisabeth Schwarzkopf (soprano) and Gerald Moore on Testament Records (UK) 1206.
- 1989 Anne Sofie von Otter (mezzo-soprano) and Bengt Forsberg (piano) on Deutsche Grammophon 429727.
- 1994 Kenny G – recorded as instrumental "Brahms Lullaby" for his album Miracles: The Holiday Album.
- 2013 Bernarda Fink (mezzo-soprano) and Roger Vignoles (piano).

Recordings of Brahms's "Wiegenlied"
Rec.	Singer	V. type	Instr.	I. type	Cond. (arr.)	Time	Issuer	Released
1915	Schumann-Heink, Ernestine	contralto	unknown	orchestra	unknown	2:06	Nimbus	July 1990
1935-02-26	Schumann, Elisabeth	soprano	Reeves, George	piano	—	1:35	Naxos	May 2006
1937-03-11	Schumann, Elisabeth	soprano	unknown	orchestra	Goehr, Walter	1:59	Naxos	May 2006
1941-05-23	Crosby, Bing	vocals (Note: English version: "Brahms's Lullaby" (translated by Natalia Macfarren).)	Trotter orchestra	orchestra	Trotter, John Scott	2:46	MCA	1993
1954-06-16	Crosby, Bing	vocals	Cole Trio	jazz trio	Cole, Buddy	1:27	MCA	1993
1941-11-12	Lehmann, Lotte	soprano	Ulanowsky, Paul	piano	—	2:17	Eklipse	July 1993
1943-12-12	Lehmann, Lotte	soprano	San Francisco Symphony	orchestra	Monteux, Pierre	2:07	Eklipse	July 1993
1947-12-22	Lehmann, Lotte	soprano	unknown	orchestra	Armbruster, Robert	2:43	Naxos	November 2007
1948-08-05	Lehmann, Lotte	soprano	unknown	orchestra	Ormandy, Eugene	3:12	Eklipse	July 1993
1950-02-12	Lehmann, Lotte	soprano	Walter, Bruno	piano	—	1:47	Eklipse	September 1995
1944-12-03	Sinatra, Frank (Note: Sinatra also sang Brahms's "Cradle Song" on V-Discs: recorded 8 July 1944 (two takes of Axel Stordahl's arrangement, released on The Columbia Years 1943–1952: The V-Discs and The Real Complete Columbia Years V-Discs) and 23 October 1944 (Raymond Paige's arrangement).)	vocals	35 instrumentalists	orchestra	Stordahl, Axel	3:06	Columbia	5 October 1993
1953-02-03	Clooney, Rosemary	vocals (Note: English lyrics, "Close Your Eyes", by William Engvick.)	Faith orchestra	orchestra	Faith, Percy	2:43	Columbia	February 1953
1979-11	Fischer-Dieskau, Dietrich	baritone	Barenboim, Daniel	piano	—	1:24	DG	1983
2001-04	—		Lane, Piers	piano	(Grainger, Percy)	3:41	Hyperion	June 2002

== Sources ==
- Albin, Steve (21 November 2018). "Frank Sinatra Discography: The Columbia Years, 1942–1946". www.jazzdiscography.com.
- Arnim, Achim von, ed. (1808). "Kinderlieder: Anhang zum Wunderhorn" [Children's songs: Appendix to the Wunderhorn]. Des Knaben Wunderhorn: Alte deutsche Lieder [The boy's magic horn: old German songs] (in German). Vol. III. Heidelberg: Mohr und Zimmer. pp. 1–103.
- Berry, Paul (2014). "Ch. 1: Old Melodies, New Identities". Brahms Among Friends: Listening, Performance, and the Rhetoric of Allusion. AMS Studies in Music. OUP. pp. 41–72. ISBN 9780199982646.
- Bottge, Karen (2005). "Brahms's "Wiegenlied" and the Maternal Voice". 19th-Century Music. 28 (3): 185–213. doi:10.1525/ncm.2005.28.3.185.
- Crossland, Ken; Macfarlane, Malcolm (2013). "Appendix A: Rosemary Clooney on Record". Late Life Jazz: The Life and Career of Rosemary Clooney. New York: OUP. pp. 187–220. ISBN 978-0-19-979857-5.
- Forsling, Göran (2007). "CD Review: Elisabeth Schumann – Lieder Recordings 1930–1938". www.musicweb-international.com.
- Forsling, Göran (2008). "CD Review: Lotte Lehmann: Lieder Recordings, Vol. 6 – 1947 & 1949". www.musicweb-international.com.
- Liebergen, Patrick M., ed. (2005). "Wiegenlied (Lullaby): Johannes Brahms". Singer's Library of Song: A Vocal Anthology of Masterworks and Folk Songs from the Medieval Era Through the Twentieth Century. Alfred Music. pp. 48–52. ISBN 978-0-7390-3659-4.
- Macfarlane, Malcolm, ed. (23 January 2020). "A Bing Crosby Discography – part 1b: Commercial Recordings – The Decca Years". BING magazine. International Club Crosby.
- Ould, Barry Peter (2002). Percy Grainger: Rambles and Reflections (Media notes). Piers Lane (piano). Hyperion. CDA67279.
- Schmidt, August [in German] (14 May 1844). "Revue: im Stich erschienener Musikalien. Gebirgs-Bleameln, sechs Lieder in österreichischer Mundart für eine oder zwei Singstimmen mit Begleitung des Pianoforte, nach National-Melodien gedichtet und herausgegeben von Alexander Baumann. II. Heft. (3. Werk.) Wien bei Anton Diabelli & Comp" [Review of engraved music publications: Gebirgs-Bleameln, six songs in Austrian dialect for one or two singing voices, with pianoforte accompaniment, written after national melodies and published by Alexander Baumann, 2nd volume (Op. 3). Vienna: Anton Diabelli & Co.]. Allgemeine Wiener Musik-Zeitung (in German). IV (58). Vienna: Mechetti: 231–232.
- Swafford, Jan (1999). Johannes Brahms: A Biography. Vintage Books. ISBN 978-0-679-74582-2.
- Taller, Ellen (2017). "Johannes Brahms: Eine Sinfonie aus der Sommerfrische" [Johannes Brahms: a symphony from summer freshness]. www.sinfonia-engiadina.ch (in German).
