= Artanis Entertainment Group =

American media group

- Founded: 1999
- Genre: Reissues of Frank Sinatra recordings
- Country of origin: United States
- Location: Burbank, California

Artanis Entertainment Group is an American media group specialising in reissues of archival material. The company was founded by Frank Sinatra and Warner Bros. Records to make films and the name comes from Sinatra's surname spelled backwards. The company was reactivated as a record label following Sinatra's death in 1998, releasing several archived live concerts that had been previously unreleased.

== History ==
=== Films ===
Artanis Productions, Inc. produced the Sinatra-starring films None but the Brave (1965) and The First Deadly Sin (1980), and the TV movie Contract on Cherry Street (1977).

=== Record label ===
Artanis Entertainment Group was founded in 1999 by Sinatra's family. The name of the label is "Sinatra" spelled backwards. The new label grew out of a deal between Warner Bros. Records and Reprise Records (Sinatra's label), creating the new Artanis label. As part of the deal, the family moved the record company to Warner's headquarters in Burbank, California.

The label's first two reissues in 1999 were The Summit, a previously unreleased live recording from a 1962 set by Sinatra, Dean Martin, and Sammy Davis Jr., and Sinatra '57 in Concert, a remastered recording of Sinatra's June 9, 1957 concert in Seattle. Later releases include Robin and the 7 Hoods (1964) and The Sinatra Family Wish You a Merry Christmas (1968).
