= Sinatra & Sextet: Live in Paris =

Live album by Frank Sinatra
- Released: March 22, 1994
- Recorded: June 5, 1962
- Genre: Vocal jazz; traditional pop
- Length: 74:04
- Label: Reprise

Frank Sinatra chronology
Sinatra Saga, Vol. 2 (1994)	Sinatra & Sextet: Live in Paris (1994)	The Song Is You (1994)

Professional ratings
Review scores
Source	Rating
Allmusic	4.5/5 stars

Sinatra & Sextet: Live in Paris is a live album by American singer Frank Sinatra, recorded in 1962 but not released until 1994. The album was released by Reprise Records.

An earlier, non-commercial edition of this concert was released in late 1992, albeit with two fewer songs than the 25 in this set. It was only the third live album ever officially released of Sinatra, after 1966's Sinatra at the Sands and 1974's The Main Event – Live.

It was his first concert he ever performed in Paris. The album is unique in that it is an entire unedited concert of Sinatra.

== Background ==
That spring Sinatra was on a World Tour for Children, playing benefit concerts that would raise money for handicapped children in Europe and Asia. It eventually extended to thirty dates in two months, starting on April 15 in Mexico City and ending June 17 in Monte Carlo. The concert which makes up the album was recorded on June 5, towards the end of the tour.

Guitarist Al Viola stated in the liner notes of the album that, since the band was gathered on such short notice, they never rehearsed with Sinatra for the tour. Much of the band had already performed with him on previous albums with the same arrangements, so he never felt rehearsals were necessary.

The performance was introduced by Charles Aznavour, who declares in French, Frank Sinatra, Paris belongs to you!

== Track listing ==
1. Introduction by Charles Aznavour – 1:04
2. "Goody Goody" (Matty Malneck, Johnny Mercer) – 1:11
3. "Imagination" (Johnny Burke, Jimmy Van Heusen) – 2:25
4. "At Long Last Love" (Cole Porter) – 2:12
5. "Moonlight in Vermont" (John Blackburn, Karl Suessdorf) – 3:33
6. "Without a Song" (Vincent Youmans, Billy Rose, Edward Eliscu) – 2:36
7. "Day In, Day Out" (Rube Bloom, Mercer) – 2:35
8. "I've Got You Under My Skin" (Porter) – 2:49
9. "I Get a Kick Out of You" (Porter) – 2:58
10. "The Second Time Around" (Sammy Cahn, Van Heusen) – 2:41
11. "Too Marvelous for Words" (Mercer, Richard A. Whiting) – 1:37
12. "My Funny Valentine" (Richard Rodgers, Lorenz Hart) – 2:49
13. "In the Still of the Night" (Porter) – 3:18
14. "April in Paris" (Vernon Duke, E.Y. Harburg) – 2:30
15. "You're Nobody till Somebody Loves You" (Page Cavanaugh, Russ Morgan, Larry Stock) – 3:53
16. "They Can't Take That Away from Me" (George Gershwin, Ira Gershwin) – 1:48
17. "Chicago (That Toddlin' Town)" (Fred Fisher) – 2:07
18. "Night and Day" (Porter) – 4:19
19. "I Could Have Danced All Night" (Alan Jay Lerner, Frederick Loewe) – 2:43
20. "One for My Baby (and One More for the Road)" (Harold Arlen, Mercer) – 5:45
21. "A Foggy Day" (G. Gershwin, I. Gershwin) – 2:15
22. "Ol' Man River" (Oscar Hammerstein II, Jerome Kern) – 3:33
23. "The Lady Is a Tramp" (Rodgers, Hart) – 3:44
24. "I Love Paris" (Porter) – 1:39
25. "Nancy (With the Laughing Face)" (Phil Silvers, Van Heusen) – 2:14
26. "Come Fly with Me" (Cahn, Van Heusen) – 3:00

== Personnel ==
- Frank Sinatra - Vocals
- Bill Miller - Piano
- Al Viola - Guitar
- Ralph Peña - Bass
- Irv Cottler - Drums
- Emil Richards - Vibraphone
- Harry Klee - Alto Saxophone, Flute
