= Greatest Love Songs (Frank Sinatra album) =

Compilation album by Frank Sinatra
- Released: January 15, 2002
- Recorded: November 5, 1953–April 11, 1966, 1999
- Genre: Traditional pop; jazz
- Length: 60:19
- Label: Reprise
- Producer: Sonny Burke

Frank Sinatra chronology
Love Songs (2001)	Greatest Love Songs (2002)	Frank Sinatra in Hollywood 1940-1964 (2002)

Professional ratings
Review scores
Source	Rating
Allmusic	4/5 stars

Greatest Love Songs is a 2002 compilation album by American singer Frank Sinatra, containing 22 love songs.

== Track listing ==
1. "My Funny Valentine" (Richard Rodgers, Lorenz Hart) - 2:31
2. "What Is This Thing Called Love?" (Cole Porter) - 2:35
3. "Like Someone in Love" (Jimmy Van Heusen, Johnny Burke) - 3:10
4. "I've Got a Crush on You" (George Gershwin, Ira Gershwin) - 2:16
5. "Let's Fall in Love" (Harold Arlen, Ted Koehler) - 2:11
6. "You'd Be So Easy to Love" (Porter) - 2:24
7. "Fly Me to the Moon (In Other Words)" (Bart Howard) - 2:30
8. "In the Blue of Evening" (Tom Montgomery, Tom Adair, Al D'Artega) - 4:03
9. "Moonlight Serenade" (Glenn Miller, Mitchell Parish) - 3:26
10. "I'm Getting Sentimental Over You" (George Bassman, Ned Washington) - 3:42
11. "In the Still of the Night" (Porter) - 3:25
12. "You and the Night and the Music" (Arthur Schwartz, Howard Dietz) - 2:36
13. "Don't Take Your Love from Me" (Henry Nemo) - 4:05
14. "I Hadn't Anyone Till You" (Ray Noble) - 3:44
15. "My Heart Stood Still" (Rodgers, Hart) - 3:06
16. "The Very Thought of You" (Noble) - 3:34
17. "The Way You Look Tonight" (Dorothy Fields, Jerome Kern) - 3:22
18. "You Brought a New Kind of Love to Me" (Sammy Fain, Irving Kahal, Pierre Norman Connor) - 2:38
19. "Night and Day" (Porter) - 3:37
20. "Come Rain or Come Shine" (Arlen, Johnny Mercer) - 4:06
21. "All the Way" [with Celine Dion] (Heusen, Sammy Cahn) - 3:53
22. "Strangers in the Night" (Bert Kaempfert, Charles Singleton, Eddie Snyder) - 2:25

== Personnel ==
- Frank Sinatra - vocals
- Count Basie and his Orchestra
- Nelson Riddle - arranger, conductor
- Don Costa
- Robert Farnon
- Sy Oliver
- Johnny Mandel
