= V-Disc Recordings, Jo Stafford =

Compilation album by Jo Stafford
- Released: August 18, 1998
- Recorded: 1940s
- Label: Collector's Choice

Professional ratings
Review scores
Source	Rating
Allmusic	4/5 stars

V-Disc Recordings is a compilation album by Jo Stafford released in 1998.

The V-Disc program began in June 1941 and continued until May 1949. It was a way for United States service people stationed overseas to have access to the music that was currently popular "at home". Musicians and recording artists made these special recordings strictly for those serving overseas and they were made and distributed by the Armed Forces Radio. Jo Stafford produced 20 V-Discs for the entertainment of those in the military during this time; this album is a compilation of the V-Disc recordings she made.

== Track listing ==
No.	Title	Writer(s)	Length
1.	"I Didn't Know About You"	Duke Ellington, Bob Russell	3:17
2.	"Gee, It's Good to Hold You"	Doris Fisher, Alan Roberts	2:48
3.	"That's for Me"	Oscar Hammerstein II, Richard Rodgers	2:48
4.	"Carry Me Back to Old Virginia"	James A. Bland	3:26
5.	"Baby, Won't You Please Come Home"	Charles Warfield, Clarence Williams	5:31
6.	"Bakery Blues"	Traditional	4:47
7.	"Alone Together"	Howard Dietz, Arthur Schwartz	3:21
8.	"Haunted Heart"	Howard Dietz, Arthur Schwartz	2:57
9.	"For You"	Joe Burke, Al Dubin	4:45
10.	"When the Red, Red Robin Comes Bob, Bob, Bobbin' Along"	Harry M. Woods	1:58
11.	"I Remember You"	Johnny Mercer, Victor Schertzinger	3:17
12.	"Blue Moon"	Lorenz Hart, Richard Rodgers	4:57
13.	"Tumbling Tumbleweeds"	Bob Nolan	2:58
14.	"When Our Hearts Were Young and Gay"	Rob Goellner, Ted Grouya	3:20
15.	"Yesterdays"	Otto Harbach, Jerome Kern	2:19
16.	"I'll Be Seeing You"	Sammy Fain, Irving Kahal	2:31
17.	"Tallahassee"	Edgar Hayes, Manny Kurtz, Irving Mills	2:25
18.	"So Right Tonight"	Bill Haley, Bobby Hayes	2:51
19.	"Manhattan Serenade"	Harold Adamson, Louis Alter	3:22
20.	"Yes, Indeed!"	Sy Oliver	3:36
