= Road to Victory (1944 film) =

The Road to Victory
- Starring: Bing Crosby; Cary Grant; Frank Sinatra; Dennis Morgan; Jack Carson; Benny Goodman; Harry James; Herbert Marshall
- Release date: May 18, 1944
- Running time: 10 minutes
- Country: United States
- Language: English

The Road to Victory is a 1944 short film from Warner Brothers notable for the appearance of Bing Crosby, a major singing and movie star, Cary Grant, a major actor in motion pictures, and Frank Sinatra, a young singer who would soon become a movie star himself. The short also featured Benny Goodman and Harry James. The movie was intended to promote the U.S. Fifth War Loan and was an edited and truncated re-release of The Shining Future from the same year.

Sinatra sings "Hot Time in the Town of Berlin" and Crosby sings "The Road to Victory" (written by Frank Loesser).

== See also ==
- Hot Time in the Town of Berlin
