= It Happened in Monterey =

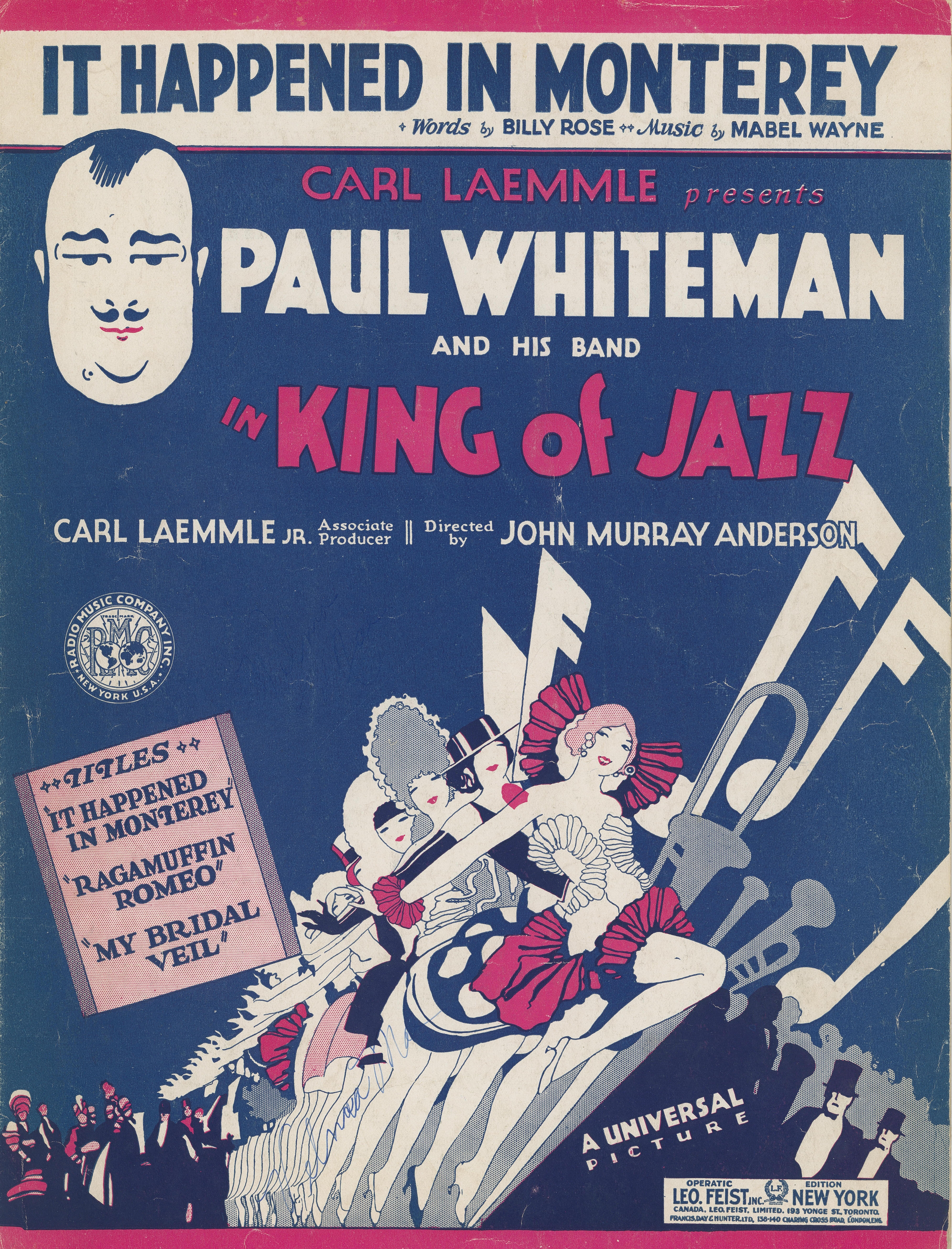
- Sheet music cover from the 1930 film

Song by Paul Whiteman and his orchestra
- Published: 1930 by Leo Feist, Inc.
- Composer: Mabel Wayne
- Lyricist: Billy Rose

"It Happened in Monterey" or "It Happened in Monterrey" is a 1930 traditional pop song composed as a waltz by Mabel Wayne, with lyrics by Billy Rose and performed by Paul Whiteman and his orchestra. It was written for the 1930 musical film King of Jazz, and was subsequently covered several times in short succession including by the Regent Club Orchestra, George Olsen and Ruth Etting. It fell out of popularity until Frank Sinatra re-recorded it for both his 1956 Capitol release Songs for Swingin' Lovers! and his 1957 live album Sinatra '57 in Concert. The song entered the public domain on January 1, 2026. (Note: Under R186042.)

== Background ==
Performance of the song in King of Jazz (1930)

"It Happened in Monterey" was written for the 1930 musical film King of Jazz. The film featured Paul Whiteman and his orchestra, while the song, written in waltz time, was composed by Mabel Wayne, with lyrics by Billy Rose. Though the lyrics refer to the city of Monterrey in "Old Mexico", the song title was misspelled, leading to popular references to the city of Monterey, California. The song was performed by John Boles and Jeanette Loff in the film. The song appears in a sequence of disparate musical performances, each introduced by a caption card, that appear between the two main production numbers.

The Paul Whiteman Orchestra then recorded the song for Columbia Records on March 21, 1930, featuring vocals by Jack Fulton. This recording features significant solos for flute and piccolo performed by Bernie Daly. The recording was a hit. Researcher Joel Whitburn estimates that this record would have charted at number 2 in April 1930.

== Recorded versions ==
The song was covered several times following the appearance in King of Jazz, including by George Olsen and Vincent Lopez. Other popular versions were by the Regent Club Orchestra on Brunswick Records, and Ruth Etting. Bing Crosby sang the song with Whiteman's orchestra in a performance at the Seattle Civic Auditorium, which was broadcast nationwide live via the Columbia Broadcasting System in April 1930. Mel Tormé recorded it in 1946 in a then-contemporary 4/4 swing arrangement with his Mel-Tones and Sonny Burke and his orchestra on the Musicraft Records label.

In 1955, the song was recorded in its original waltz form by Perry Como, and then further popularized by a 1956 Frank Sinatra recording, which, like the earlier Tormé recording, gave the song a 4/4 swing arrangement. Sinatra included it on his 1956 Capitol release Songs for Swingin' Lovers!, an album that featured arrangements by Nelson Riddle. Biographer John Frayn Turner writes: "'It Happened in Monterey'... had never sounded like that before or since". Biographer Spencer Leigh notes the "looseness of his phrasing in the second chorus". Sinatra began performing it live. It features as the second track on his 1957 live album Sinatra '57 in Concert, and also appeared on the original UK pressing of Come Fly with Me as a replacement track for the banned "On the Road to Mandalay".

Bing Crosby and Rosemary Clooney included the song in their 1958 album Fancy Meeting You Here with updated lyrics.

== In popular culture ==
Actor Al Pacino lip-synced the Sinatra version of the song in the final scene of the 1997 film The Devil's Advocate.

In 2006 Doug Gamble, a corporate and humor writer, penned new lyrics for the song as a way of promoting the city of Monterey, California.
