= Oh! Look at Me Now =

1941 single by Joe Bushkin

Single by Tommy Dorsey and His Orchestra with Frank Sinatra, Connie Haines, and The Pied Pipers
- A-side: "You Might Have Belonged to Another"
- Published: 1941
- Released: January 17, 1941
- Recorded: January 6, 1941
- Genre: Traditional pop
- Length: 3:15
- Label: Victor
- Composer: Joe Bushkin
- Lyricist: John DeVries

"Oh! Look at Me Now" is a 1941 song composed by Joe Bushkin, with lyrics by John DeVries. It is strongly associated with Frank Sinatra, who first recorded it with Tommy Dorsey and his orchestra, in an arrangement by Sy Oliver. Sinatra re-recorded the song for his 1957 A Swingin' Affair!, this time arranged and conducted by Nelson Riddle.

== Notable recordings ==
- Frank Sinatra – with Tommy Dorsey, October 24, 1940, with Tommy Dorsey, Connie Haines and The Pied Pipers, January 6, 1941, A Swingin' Affair! (1957), Sinatra '57 in Concert (1999)
- Bing Crosby recorded the song in 1954 for use on his radio show and it was subsequently included in the box set The Bing Crosby CBS Radio Recordings (1954-56) issued by Mosaic Records (catalog MD7-245) in 2009.
- Bobby Darin – for his album Oh! Look at Me Now (1962).
- Nancy Wilson – But Beautiful (1969)
- Ella Fitzgerald – All That Jazz (1989)
