= Moonlight in Vermont (song) =

1944 popular music song

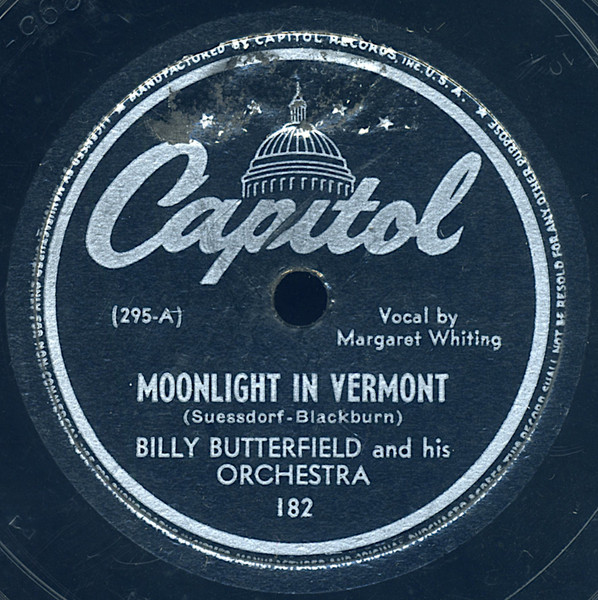
- Original 1944 single release

Song
- Released: 1944
- Genre: Popular music
- Composer: Karl Suessdorf
- Lyricist: John Blackburn

"Moonlight in Vermont" is a popular song about the U.S. state of Vermont, written by John Blackburn (lyrics) and Karl Suessdorf (music) and published in 1944. It was introduced by Margaret Whiting in a 1944 recording.

== Background ==
The lyrics are unusual in that they do not rhyme. John Blackburn, the lyricist, has been quoted as saying, "After completing the first 12 bars of the lyric, I realized there was no rhyme and then said to Karl, 'Let’s follow the pattern of no rhyme throughout the song.' It seemed right." The lyrics are also unconventional in that each verse (not counting the bridge) is a haiku.

The song is considered an unofficial state song of Vermont and is frequently played as the first dance song at Vermont wedding receptions.

== Recorded versions ==
"Moonlight in Vermont" has been covered by numerous other artists over the years, including:

- Johnny Smith recorded a version of the song in 1952 with Stan Getz, later the title track on a 1956 album
- Jo Stafford, with Paul Weston and his Orchestra, on a 1956 album called Ski Trails, issued by Columbia Records
- The Gerry Mulligan Quartet recorded a version in 1953 with Chet Baker
- Ella Fitzgerald and Louis Armstrong released a version on their 1956 album, Ella and Louis
- Billie Holiday covered the song in January 1957 for her 1958 Verve album Songs for Distingué Lovers
- Frank Sinatra covered the song for his 1958 studio album Come Fly With Me, and performed it regularly live. It appears on his live albums Sinatra Saga, Sinatra & Sextet: Live in Paris, Frank Sinatra with the Red Norvo Quintet: Live in Australia, 1959, Sinatra: Vegas and Live at the Meadowlands. Additionally, it appears as a duet with Linda Ronstadt on his 1994 album Duets II.
- Sam Cooke covered the song on his self titled 1958 debut album
- Mel Tormé covered the song for his 1960 album "Swingin' on the Moon" (Verve Records)
- Bobby Womack covered the song on his 1969 album Fly Me to the Moon
- Willie Nelson covered the song for his 1978 album Stardust
- Seth Macfarlane covered the song in his 2014 album Holiday for Swing!
