= Hot Time in the Town of Berlin =

"(There'll Be a) Hot Time in the Town of Berlin (When the Yanks Go Marching In)"
- Sheet music cover

Song
- Published: 1943
- Songwriter(s): Joe Bushkin, John DeVries

"(There'll Be a) Hot Time in the Town of Berlin (When the Yanks Go Marching In)" is a 1943 song with music and lyrics by Joe Bushkin and John DeVries, published by Barton Music Corp.

The cover illustration for the sheet music was designed by Albert Barbelle and features Uncle Sam's arm and hand painting over the word 'Berlin' in the title with red paint.

== Recordings ==
The song was originally recorded by Bing Crosby and the Andrews Sisters on June 30, 1944 and reached number one on the top 100 U.S. songs of 1944. The Crosby / Andrews Sisters version was later used on the soundtrack of the 1977 film Tracks.

The song was introduced on Frank Sinatra's CBS radio show and became popular due to its patriotic lyrics, swinging rhythm, and its orchestral arrangement. It would later appear as war propaganda in the Warner Bros. short film, Road to Victory, where it was performed by Sinatra himself.
