= Put Your Dreams Away (For Another Day) =

1943 song

"Put Your Dreams Away (For Another Day)" is a 1943 song written by Ruth Lowe, Paul Mann, and Stephan Weiss.

Frank Sinatra first recorded the song for commercial release by Columbia Records on May 1, 1945, having previously recorded it for a V-Disc and his radio show on May 24, 1944. It was during this period that Sinatra used "Put Your Dreams Away" as the closing theme song for his radio series.

He recorded the song again for Capitol Records on December 11, 1957, and again for Reprise Records on April 30, 1963 (for the album Sinatra's Sinatra, a set of re-recordings of songs he originally recorded for Columbia and Capitol.) For the 1965 album A Man and His Music, a spoken-word introduction was overdubbed by Sinatra onto the 1963 recording, in which the singer praised his theme song for having come a long way with him - "all the way from nowhere to somewhere."

The song was played at Sinatra's funeral. Lowe had also written Sinatra's first hit (as a vocalist with the Tommy Dorsey orchestra), "I'll Never Smile Again".

== Other recordings ==
- The Hi-Lo's - for their album The Hi-Lo's, I Presume (1955).
- Barry Manilow - Manilow Sings Sinatra (1998)
- Carol Kidd - A Place in My Heart (1999).
