= V-Disc =

American record label for U.S. military personnel (1943–1949)

- V-Disc 39A, "Moonlight Serenade", by Glenn Miller and His Orchestra, November 1943
- Founded: 1943
- Founder: U.S. government
- Defunct: 1949
- Genre: Jazz, swing, pop
- Country of origin: U.S.

V-Disc ("V" for Victory) was a record label that was formed in 1943 to provide records for U.S. military personnel. Captain Robert Vincent supervised the label from the Special Services division.

Many popular singers, big bands, and orchestras recorded V-discs.

== History ==
Under the leadership of James Caesar Petrillo, the American Federation of Musicians (AFM) was involved in the 1942–44 musicians' strike in which there was a recording ban on four recording companies. On October 27, 1943 George Robert Vincent convinced Petrillo to allow the union's musicians to make records for the military as long as the discs were not sold and the masters were disposed of. Musicians who had contracts with different record labels were now able to record together for this nonprofit enterprise. A group consisting of Louis Armstrong, Coleman Hawkins, and Art Tatum recorded concerts that were released as V-Discs. Captain Vincent ran the program from the Special Services Division. Artists and repertoire responsibilities were handled by Steve Sholes and Walt Heebner, both of RCA Victor, Morty Palitz of Decca Records, and Tony Janak of Columbia Records. The program started for the Army, but soon music was provided for the Navy and Marines.

Many V-Discs contained spoken-word introductions by bandleaders and musicians wishing good luck and prayers for the soldiers. Glenn Miller in December 1943, introduced a record by saying, "This is Captain Glenn Miller speaking for the Army Air Force's Training Command Orchestra and we hope that you soldiers of the Allied forces enjoy these V-Discs that we're making just for you." The Jubilee series, hosted by comedian Ernie "Bubbles" Whitman, was provided for black servicemen. The banter between Whitman and guests sometimes ventured into risque and racial humor, including the use of the ethnic slur "ofay" to refer to whites. In addition to a window into black entertainment styles, the Jubilee series chronicled the development of swing music on the cusp of bebop. V-disc recordings provide important archives of the Billy Eckstine Orchestra and the International Sweethearts of Rhythm. The "V" stands for "Victory" although Vincent said the "V" stood for "Vincent".

The V-Disc program ended in 1949. Audio masters and stampers were destroyed. Leftover V-Discs at bases and on ships were discarded. On some occasions, the FBI and the Provost Marshal's Office confiscated and destroyed V-Discs that servicemen had smuggled home. An employee at a Los Angeles record company served a short prison sentence for the illegal possession of over 2,500 V-Discs.

== See also ==
- The Columbia Years 1943–1952: The V-Discs – Frank Sinatra collection
- The Real Complete Columbia Years V-Discs – Sinatra collection
- V-Disc Recordings, Jo Stafford
