= All of Me (jazz standard) =

1931 jazz standard by Gerald Marks and Seymour Simon

Song
- Published: 1931 by Irving Berlin, Inc.
- Genre: Jazz; swing
- Songwriters: Gerald Marks, Seymour Simons

"All of Me"
1931 recording featuring Ruth Etting

"All of Me" is a popular song and jazz standard written by Gerald Marks and Seymour Simons in 1931.

== Composition and characteristics ==
Gerald Marks and Seymour Simons wrote the "All of Me" words and music in 1931. It has an ABAC structure, and is written in the key of B-flat major. There is a 20-bar introductory verse, but this is routinely omitted.

"The melody [...] combines the contradictory possibilities of the song. The downward thrusts of the opening phrases hint at emotional despair while the closing line, with its repeated high notes, seems almost jubilant." It is usually performed at a medium tempo. The harmony is relatively straightforward, and has served as the basis for Lennie Tristano's "Line Up", Warne Marsh's "Background Music", and Bill Dobbins's "Lo Flame".

In 2000, "All of Me" was given the Towering Song Award by the Songwriters Hall of Fame.

== Successful recordings ==
"All of Me" first came to public awareness when a performance by Belle Baker was broadcast over the radio in 1931. Paul Whiteman and His Orchestra recorded the song on December 1 that year, with vocalist Mildred Bailey; this went to the top of the US pop charts. Within weeks, another two versions were in the charts, with a Louis Armstrong rendition also reaching No. 1, and Ben Selvin and His Orchestra peaking at No. 19. The song was used in the 1932 film Careless Lady. In the view of critic Ted Gioia, the definitive version was sung by Billie Holiday in 1941: "she staked a claim of ownership that no one has managed to dislodge in subsequent years". Two years later, Lynne Sherman's recording with Count Basie and His Orchestra reached No. 14 in the charts.

Frank Sinatra recorded several versions of "All of Me". His 1948 release peaked at No. 21. He also sang it in the film Meet Danny Wilson, which may have helped Johnnie Ray's rendition up to No. 12 in the charts that year. Willie Nelson's recording of the song was included in his Stardust album and reached No. 3 on the Hot Country Songs chart in 1978.

== See also ==
- List of 1930s jazz standards
