= Seymour Simons =

American musician

- Born: January 14, 1896; Detroit, Michigan, United States
- Died: February 12, 1949 (aged 53) Detroit, Michigan, United States
- Genres: Jazz
- Occupations: Musician; composer; orchestra leader; radio producer
- Instrument: Piano

Seymour Simons (January 14, 1896 – February 12, 1949) was an American pianist, composer, orchestra leader, and radio producer.

== Biography ==
Simons, born January 14, 1896, in Detroit, Michigan, wrote student operas at the University of Michigan. He originally trained in engineering and went to work as a research engineer at a Detroit motor plant. But when the First World War intervened, he instead found himself in aeronautical research.

Simons returned to Detroit after service in World War I and built a reputation as a pianist and songwriter, providing material for stage stars Nora Bayes and Elsie Janis. In 1919, he wrote "Just Like a Gypsy" with Bayes, who, in addition to being a popular entertainer, was already a songwriter best known for "Shine on Harvest Moon", written with her performer/husband Jack Norworth in 1910. "Just Like a Gypsy" was recorded in 1941 by Maxine Sullivan and in 1946 by Peggy Lee.

A collaboration in 1926 with Richard A. Whiting produced “Hello, Baby,” recorded by Ruth Etting, and the popular “Breezin’ Along With the Breeze”, in conjunction with Haven Gillespie, which was first recorded by Josephine Baker, used in the film Pete Kelly's Blues (1955), and sung by Lucille Ball and Desi Arnaz in their 1954 film, The Long, Long Trailer. The trio also collaborated on "(I'm In Love With You) Honey" which was performed in the 1945 film Her Highness and the Bellboy. With Gus Kahn, Simons wrote “Just Can’t Be Bothered with Me” (1929) and “Sweetheart of My Student Days” (1930).

Simons worked in radio production and booking from 1928 to 1932 and led an orchestra on the radio in the early ‘30s. In 1931, he collaborated with Gerald Marks on his biggest hit, “All of Me”, which has maintained its popularity over the years. It featured in the 1984 movie All of Me, starring Steve Martin and Lily Tomlin, and in 2000 won the “Towering Song” award given by the Songwriters Hall of Fame.
