= Gerald Marks =

American composer

- Born: October 13, 1900; Saginaw, Michigan, U.S.
- Died: January 27, 1997 (aged 96); New York City, U.S.
- Occupation: Composer

Gerald Marks (October 13, 1900 – January 27, 1997) was an American composer of popular music. He was best known for the 1931 song "All of Me", which he co-wrote with Seymour Simons and has been recorded about 2,000 times. He also wrote the songs "That's What I Want for Christmas" for the film Stowaway starring Shirley Temple, and "Is It True What They Say About Dixie?" recorded by Al Jolson and Rudy Vallee. The success of "All of Me" led him to become a member of ASCAP, and he remained active in the organization for decades, serving on its board of directors from 1970 to 1981.

Marks was married to Edna Berger, a successful newspaperwoman and labor organizer.
