= I'll Never Smile Again =

1939 song by Ruth Lowe

Single by Tommy Dorsey and His Orchestra with Frank Sinatra and the Pied Pipers
- B-side: "Marcheta"
- Published: November 27, 1939 by Sun Music Co., Inc., New York
- Released: June 7, 1940
- Recorded: May 23, 1940
- Genre: Jazz
- Length: 3:12
- Label: Victor 26628
- Songwriter: Ruth Lowe

"I'll Never Smile Again"

Single by The Platters

from the album Remember When?
- B-side: "You Don't Say"
- Published: Sun Music, Inc.
- Released: July 7, 1961
- Recorded: 1961
- Genre: R&B
- Length: 2:53
- Label: Mercury
- Songwriter: Ruth Lowe

The Platters singles chronology
"If I Didn't Care" (1961)	"I'll Never Smile Again" (1961)	"You'll Never Know" (1961)

"I'll Never Smile Again" is a 1939 song which became a 1940 Billboard chart-topper by Tommy Dorsey written by Ruth Lowe. It has been recorded by many other artists since, becoming a jazz and pop standard.

The most successful and best-known million selling single version of the song was recorded by Tommy Dorsey and His Orchestra, with vocals provided by Frank Sinatra and The Pied Pipers. Tommy Dorsey has a solo on trombone during the break and as a coda near the end of the song. This recording was released as a Victor 78, 26628A, in 1940. This version was number one on Billboard's first "National List of Best Selling Retail Records"—the first official national music chart—on July 27, 1940, staying at the top spot for 12 weeks until October 12, 1940. The tune was inducted into the Grammy Hall of Fame in 1982. Tommy Dorsey and Frank Sinatra performed the song in the 1941 Paramount Pictures musical Las Vegas Nights. The Dorsey and Sinatra recording was also released as a V-disc in February, 1946 by the U.S. War Department for the armed forces.

Ruth Lowe personally presented the song to Tommy Dorsey. Percy Faith performed it first live on radio broadcasts on the Canadian Broadcasting Corporation. Glenn Miller made the first recording and was the first to release it. The composition had its copyright renewed in 1966, and it will enter the American public domain on January 1, 2035.

== Versions ==
- Glenn Miller was the first to record and release the song on RCA Bluebird Records with Ray Eberle on vocals. He recorded the song on February 19, 1940, and released it on April 12.
- The Ink Spots recorded the song in August 1940, which was just a few months after the first release of the song.
- In 1940, the song was also recorded by Tony Martin, Elton Britt, Ginny Simms, and Oscar Rabin
- The song appears on the 1954 Dave Brubeck Quartet live album Jazz at the College of the Pacific.
- Billie Holiday recorded the song in 1959, the last year of her life, on the posthumous album Last Recording.
- The Platters brought the song back to the top 40 in 1961, when their version went to #25 on the Hot 100 and #17 on the Hot R&B Sides chart. In Canada it reached #21.
- Al Hirt released a version in 1962 on his Trumpet and Strings
- Bill Evans released it on his 1963 album, Interplay
- Jo Stafford, who had sung background on the Sinatra bestseller as an original Pied Piper, covered it in her 1963 studio album saluting Dorsey hits.
- Frank Sinatra re-recorded it for his 1959 No One Cares album. This re-recording omitted the celeste and was dominated by a lush string orchestra. Sinatra then made a second re-recording of the song in 1965 for the double album A Man and His Music, this time complete with a faithful reproduction of the celeste and choral accompaniment which characterized the 1940 recording that was arranged by Fred Stulce.
- The song was also covered by popular Australian rock group Daddy Cool, who scored an Australian Top 20 hit with their version, which was released as a single in July 1972, shortly before the group broke up; they also performed it at their farewell concert in Melbourne, Australia in August 1972, which was recorded and subsequently released as a double-album in 1973.

== See also ==
- List of number-one singles of 1940 (U.S.)

== Sources ==
- Peter Jennings, Until I Smile At You: How one girl's heartbreak electrified Frank Sinatra's fame! (Victoria, BC, Canada: Castle Carrington, 2020).
- Peter J. Levinson, Tommy Dorsey: Livin' in a Great Big Way: a Biography (Cambridge, MA: Da Capo Press, 2005). ISBN 978-0-306-81111-1
- Robert L. Stockdale, Tommy Dorsey: On The Side (Metuchen, NJ: The Scarecrow Press, 1995). ISBN 978-0-8108-2951-0
