= One for My Baby (and One More for the Road) =

1943 song written by Harold Arlen and Johnny Mercer

- Sheet music cover

Song
- Published: 1943 by Edwin H Morris & Co.
- Genre: Traditional Pop
- Composer: Harold Arlen
- Lyricist: Johnny Mercer

"One for My Baby (and One More for the Road)" is a song written by Harold Arlen and Johnny Mercer for the movie musical The Sky's the Limit (1943) and first performed in the film by Fred Astaire.

== Background ==
Harold Arlen described the song as "another typical Arlen tapeworm" – a "tapeworm" being the trade slang for any song which went over the conventional 32-bar length. He called it "a wandering song. [Lyricist] Johnny [Mercer] took it and wrote it exactly the way it fell. Not only is it long – fifty-eight bars – but it also changes key. Johnny made it work." In the opinion of Arlen's biographer, Edward Jablonski, the song is "musically inevitable, rhythmically insistent, and in that mood of 'metropolitan melancholic beauty' that writer John O'Hara finds in all of Arlen's music."

The song was further popularized by Frank Sinatra. Sinatra recorded the song several times during his career: in 1947 with Columbia Records, in 1954 for the film soundtrack album Young at Heart, in 1958 for Frank Sinatra Sings for Only the Lonely, in 1962 for Sinatra & Sextet: Live in Paris, in 1966 for Sinatra at the Sands and finally, in 1993, for his Duets album. At a Johnny Carson-hosted Rat Pack concert at the Kiel Opera House in St. Louis in 1965, Sammy Davis Jr., backed by Quincy Jones conducting the Count Basie Orchestra, performed the song imitating the styles of successively Fred Astaire, Nat King Cole, Billy Eckstine, Vaughn Monroe, Tony Bennett, Mel Tormé, Frankie Laine, Louis Armstrong, an inebriated Dean Martin, and Jerry Lewis. Bennett, the last surviving of those imitated, continued to perform the song until his retirement in 2021 at the age of 95. During his final concert performances, at Radio City Music Hall, Bennett's performance of 'One For My Baby' was deemed a "highlight of his set" that "went from daring [due to the circumstances] to sublime".

== Recordings ==
Many renditions of "One for My Baby (and One More for the Road)" have been performed. The following is a list of notable/well-known versions that have been recorded thus far:

- Fred Astaire (1943) – 4:59 – Available on Somewhere Over the Rainbow: The Golden Age of Hollywood Musicals and Hollywood's Best: The 40s
- Johnny Mercer (1946) – 3:09 – Available on Capitol Collector's Series
- Frank Sinatra (1947) – 3:07 – Available on The Essential Frank Sinatra: The Columbia Years
- Cab Calloway (1951) – 3:20 – As a single, with Shot Gun Boogie; available on Hi-De-Ho and Other Movies (2004)
- Frank Sinatra (1954) – 4:05 – Recorded for the soundtrack to the film Young at Heart; available on Frank Sinatra in Hollywood 1940–1964
- Tony Bennett (1957) – 3:10 – A chart single, recorded live; a later studio version appeared in 1992 on Perfectly Frank
- Billie Holiday (1957) – 5:42 – Available on Songs for Distingué Lovers
- Fred Astaire (1959) – 3:02 – Available originally on Now [Kapp 1165 / 3049]
- Ella Fitzgerald (1960) – 4:18 – Available on Ella Fitzgerald Sings Songs from Let No Man Write My Epitaph
- Etta James (1961) – 3:26 – Available on The Second Time Around
- Wes Montgomery (1961) – 7:38 – Available on SO Much Guitar!
- Oberia Martin (1963) - 2:12 - Keith Records (Keith 6505) single B-side
- Frank Sinatra (1966) – 4:40 – (live version) – Available on Sinatra at the Sands
- Sammy Davis Jr. (1967) – 10:20 – On the live album That's All!
- Willie Nelson (1979) – 2:36 – Available on Willie & Leon: One For the Road
- Rosemary Clooney (1983) – 3:46 – On Rosemary Clooney Sings the Music of Harold Arlen
- Nana Mouskouri (2005) – 3:15 – Available on I'll Remember You

== In film and television ==
- The song was by sung by Maggie Rogers on The Late Show with Stephen Colbert on April 1, 2026. She snuck in the name "Stephen" to suit the occasion – "And, Stephen, I know you're getting ready to close" reminiscent of when the same
- song was by sung by Bette Midler to Johnny Carson on the penultimate night of The Tonight Show Starring Johnny Carson (May 21, 1992). It earned Midler that year's Emmy Award for Outstanding Individual Performance in a Variety or Music Program. The lyrics were adapted by Marc Shaiman to suit the occasion – such as "And, John, I know you're getting anxious to close".
- Beverly Garland performs the song in Season 1, Episode 13 of the 1959 American television series The Twilight Zone.
- Jane Russell performs the song in the 1952 film-noir Macao.
- Ida Lupino performs the song in the 1948 film-noir Road House.
