= Ruth Lowe =

Canadian pianist and songwriter (1914–1981)

- Born: August 12, 1914; Toronto, Ontario, Canada
- Died: January 4, 1981 (aged 66)
- Occupations: Pianist, songwriter
- Instrument: Piano

Ruth Lowe (August 12, 1914 – January 4, 1981) was a Canadian pianist and songwriter. She composed the first Billboard top 80 song "I'll Never Smile Again".

== Early life ==
Born in Toronto but raised in Glendale, California, Lowe returned to her birth country of Canada as a young woman and began working as a pianist. In 1936, Lowe was working in the 'Song Shop' in Toronto when Ina Ray Hutton brought her all-female band (the Melodears) to town. Her piano player had taken ill, and Hutton was frantically trying to locate a good-looking blonde lady replacement. Lowe auditioned, and became the regular pianist in Ina Ray's band. At age 23 in 1938, Lowe married Harold Cohen, a Chicago music publicist. It was a happy marriage that only lasted one year until Cohen's death of kidney failure during an operation in 1939. In her deep grief, Lowe returned to live in Toronto. In her apartment, she composed "I'll Never Smile Again".

== Songwriter ==
The song "I'll Never Smile Again" was first heard on the Canadian Broadcasting Corporation's (CBC) radio program Music By Faith, in an arrangement by Canadian musician Percy Faith, who would soon go on to fame in the US and the world. Approximately a year later, Lowe passed a copy of the tune to a guitarist in the Tommy Dorsey band, Carmen Mastren, hoping to have Dorsey hear the tune. Dorsey initially passed on the song, giving it to Glenn Miller, but then had it arranged for his young singer, Frank Sinatra, and the Pied Pipers. It was an early, major hit song for Sinatra. Lowe wrote the lyrics for another Frank Sinatra hit, "Put Your Dreams Away (For Another Day)". She and her son Tom Sandler wrote the song "Take Your Sins to the River" for The Travellers.

== Personal life and legacy ==
In 1945, Lowe married Nathan Sandler and the union produced two sons, Tommy and Stephen.

Lowe died of cancer in 1981. "I'll Never Smile Again" was inducted into the Grammy Hall of Fame in 1982.

In 2020, Until I Smile at You: How One Girl’s Heartbreak Electrified Frank Sinatra’s Fame!, a biography written by Peter Jennings with Tom Sandler, Lowe’s son, was published by Castle Carrington Publishing.

In 2021, Ruth's Wonderful Song, a children's book biography by Jennings, was published by Tellwell Talent.

in 2022, Canadian writer and filmmaker Jamila Pomeroy optioned and began development of a screen adaptation of Until I Smile at You.
