= John DeVries =

American lyricist, interior designer and illustrator

John DeVries (December 2, 1915 – April 17, 1992) was an American lyricist, interior designer and illustrator.

He was born in Wayne, Pennsylvania in 1915. Collaborating with the pianist Joe Bushkin, he wrote the lyrics for many songs, the most famous being "Oh! Look at Me Now", a hit for Frank Sinatra in 1941. They also wrote "There'll be a Hot Time in the Town of Berlin" later during the Second World War when they were in the army; it was recorded by several artists. DeVries also wrote songs with Eddie Condon, including "Wherever There's Love," which Lee Wiley sang.

He was an interior designer for celebrated New Yorkers, and for jazz clubs in New York, including Eddie Condon's on 54th Street in the 1970s. He was an illustrator for advertising and for books and music publishing, including album covers.
