= Joe Bushkin =

American jazz pianist

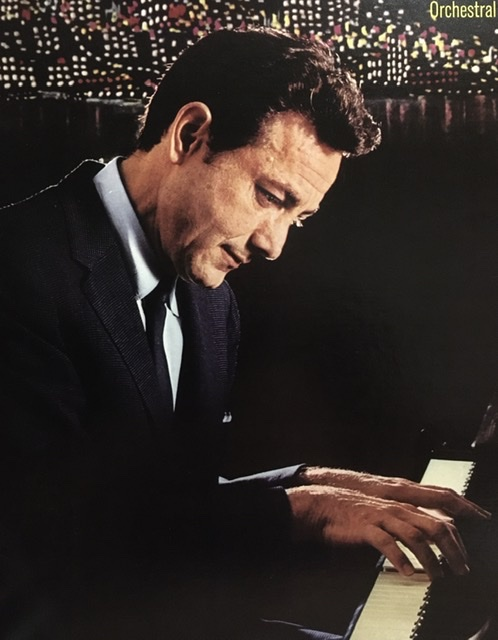

Background information
- Born: Joseph Bushkin; November 7, 1916; New York City, New York, U.S.
- Died: November 3, 2004 (aged 87) Santa Barbara, California, U.S.
- Genres: Jazz, swing
- Instruments: Piano, trumpet

Joseph Bushkin (November 7, 1916 – November 3, 2004) was an American jazz pianist.

== Life and career ==
Born in New York City, Bushkin began his career by playing trumpet and piano with New York City dance bands, including Frank LaMare's Band at the Roseland Ballroom in Brooklyn. He joined Bunny Berigan's band in 1935, played with Eddie Condon from 1936 to 1937, and with Max Kaminsky and Joe Marsala, before rejoining Berigan in 1938. He then left to join Muggsy Spanier's Ragtime Band in 1939.

From the late 1930s through to the late 1940s, he also worked with Tommy Dorsey and Eddie Condon on records, radio and television. He worked on the soundtrack of Road to Morocco (1942), starring Bing Crosby, and several commercial sessions. Wartime United States army air corp turned him back into a trumpeter; he also recorded with Lester Young on piano and directed music for Moss Hart’s morale-booster Winged Victory on Broadway for six months before serving in the South Pacific. After his service in World War II he worked with Louis Armstrong, Bud Freeman and Benny Goodman.

Bushkin performed with Louis Armstrong and his All Stars with Velma Middleton singing vocals for the ninth Cavalcade of Jazz concert held at Wrigley Field in Los Angeles. The concert was produced by Leon Hefflin, Sr. on June 7, 1953. Also featured that day were Roy Brown and his Orchestra, Don Tosti and His Mexican Jazzmen, Earl Bostic, Nat "King" Cole, and Shorty Rogers and his Orchestra.

His best-known composition might be "Oh! Look at Me Now", with John DeVries, written when he worked in Tommy Dorsey's band in 1941. That song became Frank Sinatra's second hit and one of his most enduring songs, right after "Polka Dots and Moonbeams."

One of Bushkin's television appearances was on a thirty-minute Judy Garland musical special produced for the General Electric Theater which aired on April 8, 1956, on the CBS Television Network. According to Coyne Steven Sanders, author of the book Rainbow's End: The Judy Garland Show, Bushkin was a last-minute replacement for the classic pianist Leonard Pennario. On that program, he accompanied Garland on piano as she sang "Last Night When We Were Young" and "Life Is Just a Bowl of Cherries."

In his 60s, Bushkin's semi-retirement was ended by an offer from Bing Crosby for them to tour together in 1976 and 1977; Bushkin also appeared on Crosby's 1975 Christmas TV special with Fred Astaire. He also performed in a concert series at New York's St. Regis hotel in 1984 that celebrated his 50 years in show business.

== Personal life ==
He married Francice Oliver Netcher, elder sister of socialite Mollie Wilmot. The couple had four daughters (Mrs. Nina Judson, Mrs. Maria Stave, Mrs. Tippy Bushkin, and Mrs. Christina Merrill). They lived in Santa Barbara, California, on a ranch.

Joe Bushkin died of pneumonia in Santa Barbara, California, in 2004. His widow died in 2011, aged 91.

== Discography ==
- 1950 I Love a Piano (Atlantic)
- 1950 Piano Moods - Joe Bushkin (Columbia)
- 1951 After Hours with Joe Bushkin (Columbia)
- 1954 Piano and Rhythm (Royal)
- 1955 The Jazz Keyboards, compilation with Lennie Tristano, Marian McPartland, Bobby Scott (Savoy)
- 1956 A Fellow Needs a Girl (Capitol)
- 1956 Midnight Rhapsody (Capitol) (No. 14 US)
- 1956 At Twilight with Eddie Heywood (Epic)
- 1957 Skylight Rhapsody (Capitol)
- 1957 Bushkin Spotlights Berlin (Capitol)
- 1958 Blue Angels (Capitol)
- 1958 Nightsounds (Capitol)
- 1958 I Get a Kick Out of Porter (Capitol)
- 1958 Piano After Midnight with Buck Clayton (Fontana/Epic)
- 1959 Listen to the Quiet (Capitol)
- 1964 In Concert, Town Hall (Reprise)
- 1966 Night Sounds San Francisco with Marty Paich (Decca)
- 1977 Play It Again Joe (United Artists)
- 1979 The World Is Waiting with Mel Powell (Commodore)

With Ruth Brown

- Ruth Brown (Atlantic, 1957)

Joe bushkin and his swinging strings.Dar'ling (for Tallulah)/Portrait of Tallulah No2 Columbia records cat# 3-39214 7inch Lp. Date?
