= Frank Sinatra's recorded legacy =

Frank Sinatra's musical career began in the swing era in 1935, and ended in 1995, although he did briefly retire in 1971, before returning to music in 1973. Sinatra is one of the most influential music artists of the 20th century, and has sold 150 million records worldwide, making him one of the best-selling music artists of all-time. Rock critic Robert Christgau called Sinatra "the greatest singer of the 20th century". In addition to his music career, Sinatra was also a successful film actor, having won the Academy Award for Best Supporting Actor for his role as Private Angelo Maggio in From Here to Eternity (1953).

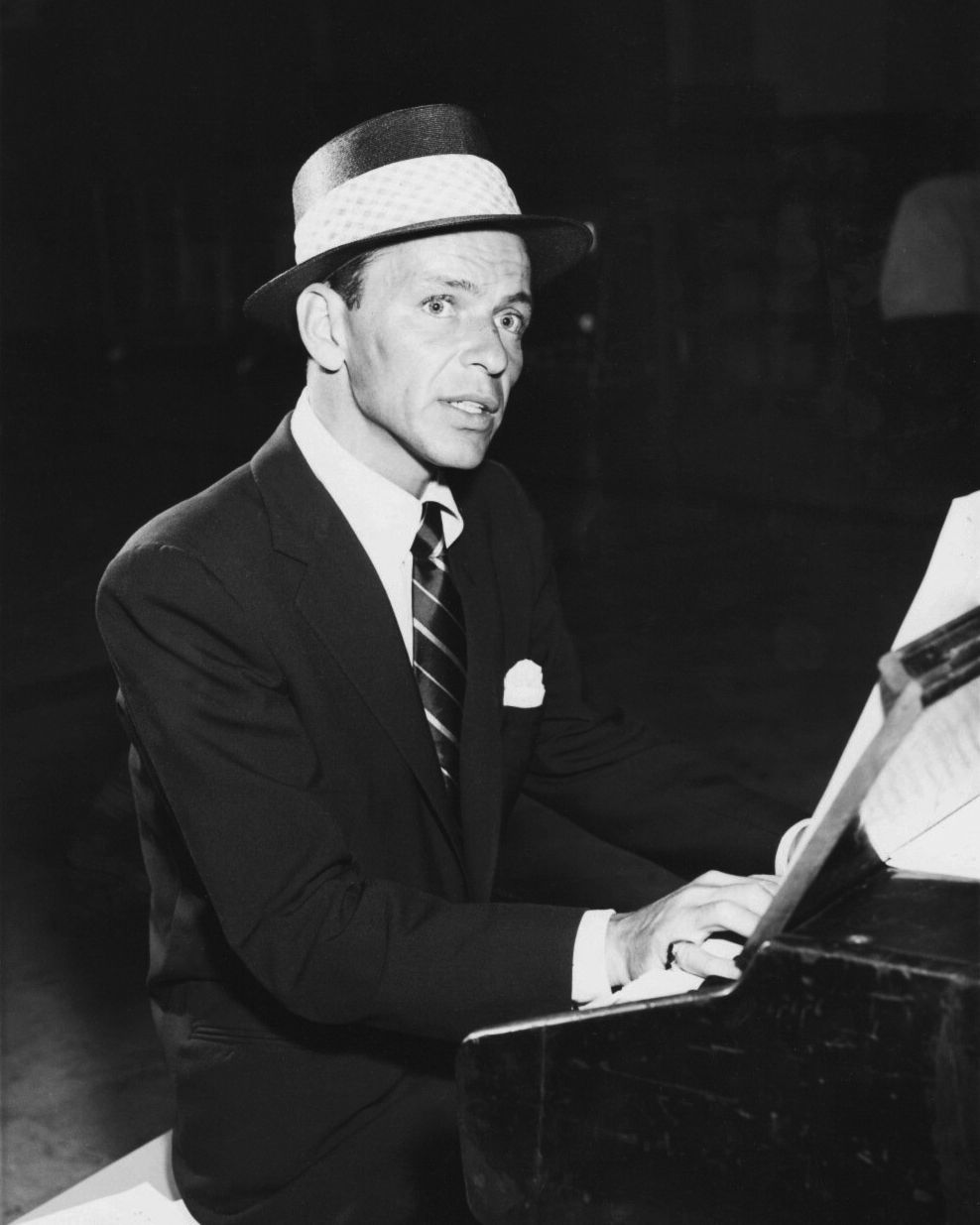
Sinatra in 1955

== Influences ==
Sinatra's vocal style represented a strong departure from the "crooning" style of his idol, Bing Crosby. Sinatra's generation represented the first generation of children that had grown up in the era of the microphone, and the amplification of sound enabled singers to sing in a much softer, personal and nuanced style. However Sinatra, as he himself once noted, sang more, by which he meant that he introduced a bel canto sound to the tradition begun by Crosby. And, more importantly, he might be said to have brought the Crosby tradition to artistic completion, taking it to levels of intensity and depth of feeling that, because of the displacement of the Crosby – Sinatra tradition by rock and roll and subsequent genres, are unlikely to be achieved again.

Two other great performers of the 1930s and 1940s were significant influences on Sinatra: Billie Holiday and Mabel Mercer. Sinatra regularly heard "Lady Day" in New York clubs in the 1940s and learned from her the importance of authenticity of emotion. From Mercer he learned the importance of the element of "story" in a song. For Sinatra a song is a three- to four-minute narrative — sometimes even the story of himself, his own life, his own heartaches, his own feelings of buoyancy — and this is why Ella Fitzgerald could say of him, "With Frank, it's always this little guy, telling this ... story." The archetypal examples of the Sinatra song as story could later be found in two selections from his 1958 Capitol album, Frank Sinatra Sings For Only The Lonely: "Angel Eyes" and "One For My Baby (And One More For The Road)".

== Sinatra's voice ==
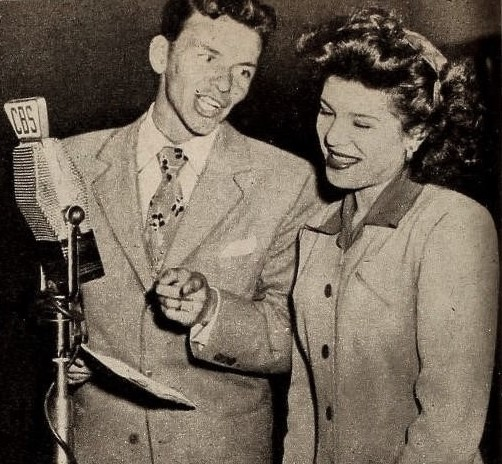
Sinatra with Eileen Barton in 1945

Sinatra made a point of studying Tommy Dorsey's trombone playing as a means of cultivating a more free-flowing vocal style — he noticed that Dorsey used a small airhole at the side of his mouth to sneak breaths when playing. Sinatra would employ a similar technique, and so be able to hold notes for incredibly long durations. In addition to this, Sinatra started to jog and swim underwater to develop his lung capacity — which enabled him to continue a musical phrase through a stanza without pausing, or breaking the note, for breath. Sinatra's legato-style of singing/phrasing took pop singing in new directions when most singers of the 1940s were keen to emulate Bing Crosby.

As happens with many singers, Sinatra suffered at least one period of major vocal difficulty, which he remedied with the help of Metropolitan Opera baritone Robert Merrill.

As a song-stylist, Sinatra's jazz-infused approach to singing seemed to occur with the end of the "Big Band" era and ushering in of an era that favored the vocalist and made him/her the focus, not the bandleader and his band.

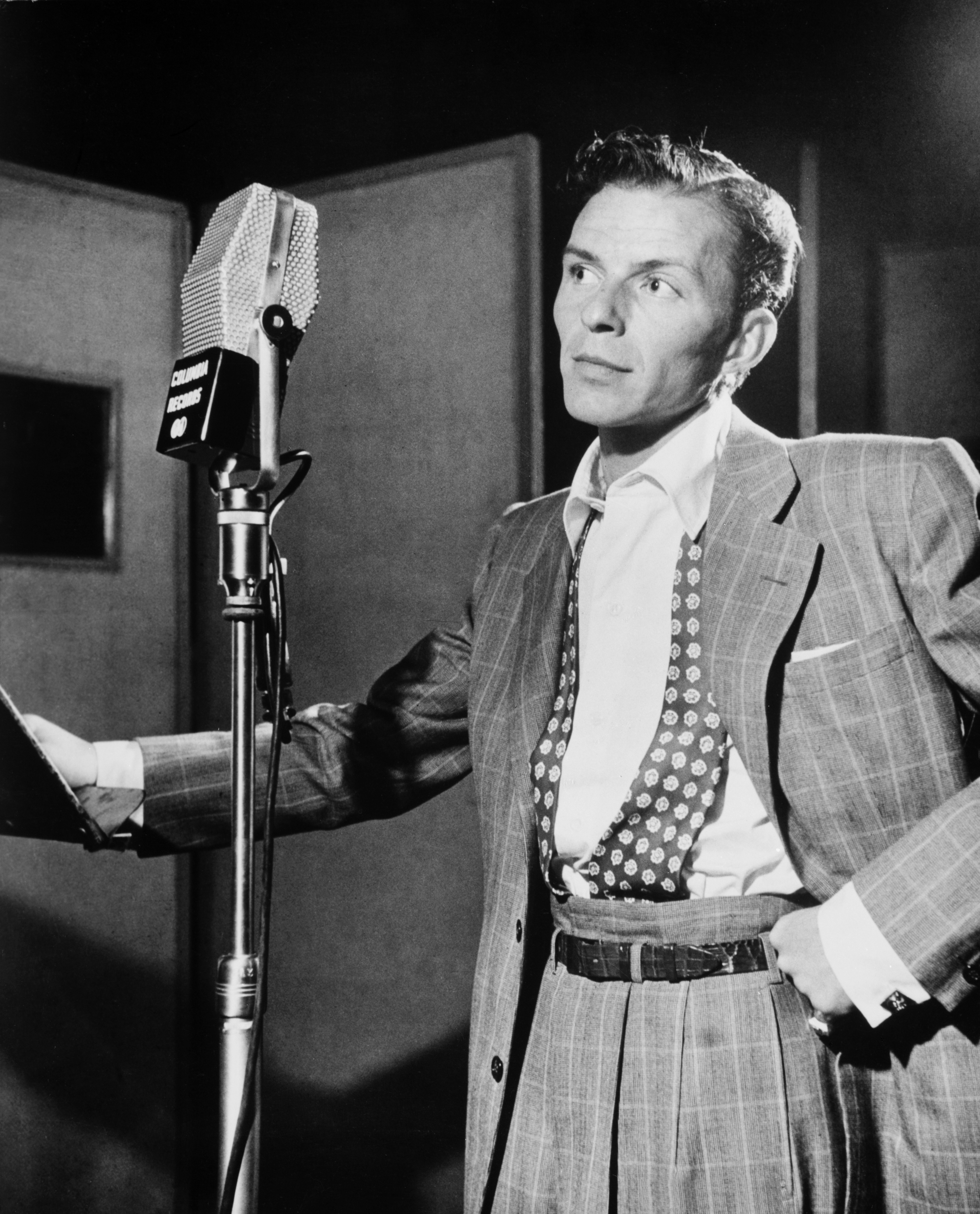
Sinatra at Liederkranz Hall in New York City in ca. 1947

According to music critic Henry Pleasants "The voice itself was a typical Italian light baritone with a two octave range from G to G, declining, as it darkened in later years, to F to F and with greater potential at the top than he was commonly disposed to exploit. He could and sometimes did depress the larynx and 'cover' as classical singers do, to sustain a full rounded tone in moving up the scale. On his recording 'Day by Day,' for example he gives out with full-voiced, admirably focused D's and E's and even lands a briefly held but confident high G just before the end." His early recordings found him singing in near-tenor range, hitting a high F on "All or Nothing At All" (1939) or "Where's My Bess" (1946), whilst being equally adept in the lower register, the low E on his 1962 recording of "Ol' Man River" being a prime example of such. His phrasing was also impeccable, getting to the heart of a song by emphasizing words and lines in ways that made a song more personal, whilst his ability to hold notes, sing above or behind the beat and rest on a note were hallmarks of a singer fully in command of his instrument.

== Sinatra as a conductor ==
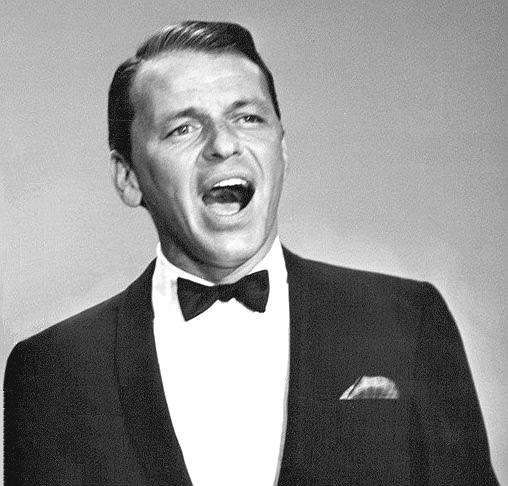
Sinatra in 1962

Between 1946 and 1983, Sinatra conducted seven albums and occasionally conducted live orchestras on stage. His first recordings on which he wielded the baton were instigated by producer Mitch Miller, who approached Columbia boss Maine Sachs to request that Sinatra conduct some of the work of Alec Wilder, later released as Frank Sinatra Conducts The Music Of Alec Wilder. In 1956, Sinatra recorded the first album in the Capitol Records tower, not as a vocalist, but as a conductor on the album Frank Sinatra Conducts Tone Poems of Color. In 1957 and 1959, he conducted albums for Peggy Lee — The Man I Love — and Dean Martin — Sleep Warm — the latter, charting inside Billboard's Top 40. A lesser-known project for his own label, Reprise, entitled Frank Sinatra Conducts Music from Pictures and Plays remains relatively obscure, and it was 20 years before Sinatra conducted in a studio again, for Sylvia Syms on the album Syms by Sinatra, which featured the final arrangements of Don Costa. The following year Sinatra conducted for trumpeter Charles Turner on the album What's New?.

== Genres ==
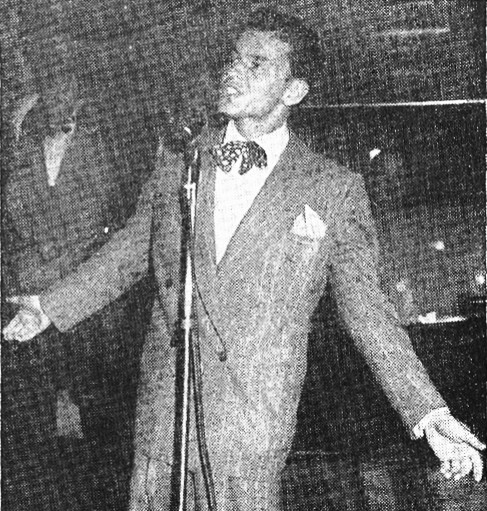
Sinatra in a Billboard ad in 1945

Sinatra would certainly have been considered a 'pop' singer before the rock and roll era, and the epithets 'traditional pop" or more specifically "classic pop" have perhaps been coined to describe Sinatra's style. In addition, Sinatra would and did tackle several styles and genres of music throughout his career, with differing degrees of success.

There still exists a debate as to whether Sinatra was a jazz singer. He certainly performed with many of the finest jazz musicians and, in fact, headlined the Newport Jazz Festival and toured with the Red Norvo Quintet. There are very few occasions when Sinatra was recorded scat singing, but minor nuances and slight deviations from the vocal line are a hallmark of the material he recorded, and he was also known for his impeccable jazz timing and phrasing. Indeed, it is impossible to imagine the Sinatra after 1953 without the influence of jazz. It is no accident that he would be Lester Young's ideal singer in the band Young had hoped to lead, nor that Miles Davis identified Sinatra's phrasing as an influence on his own. The list of Sinatra's jazz admirers is long and stellar, including such figures as Count Basie, Stan Getz, Oscar Peterson and Jaco Pastorius.

== Songs and albums ==
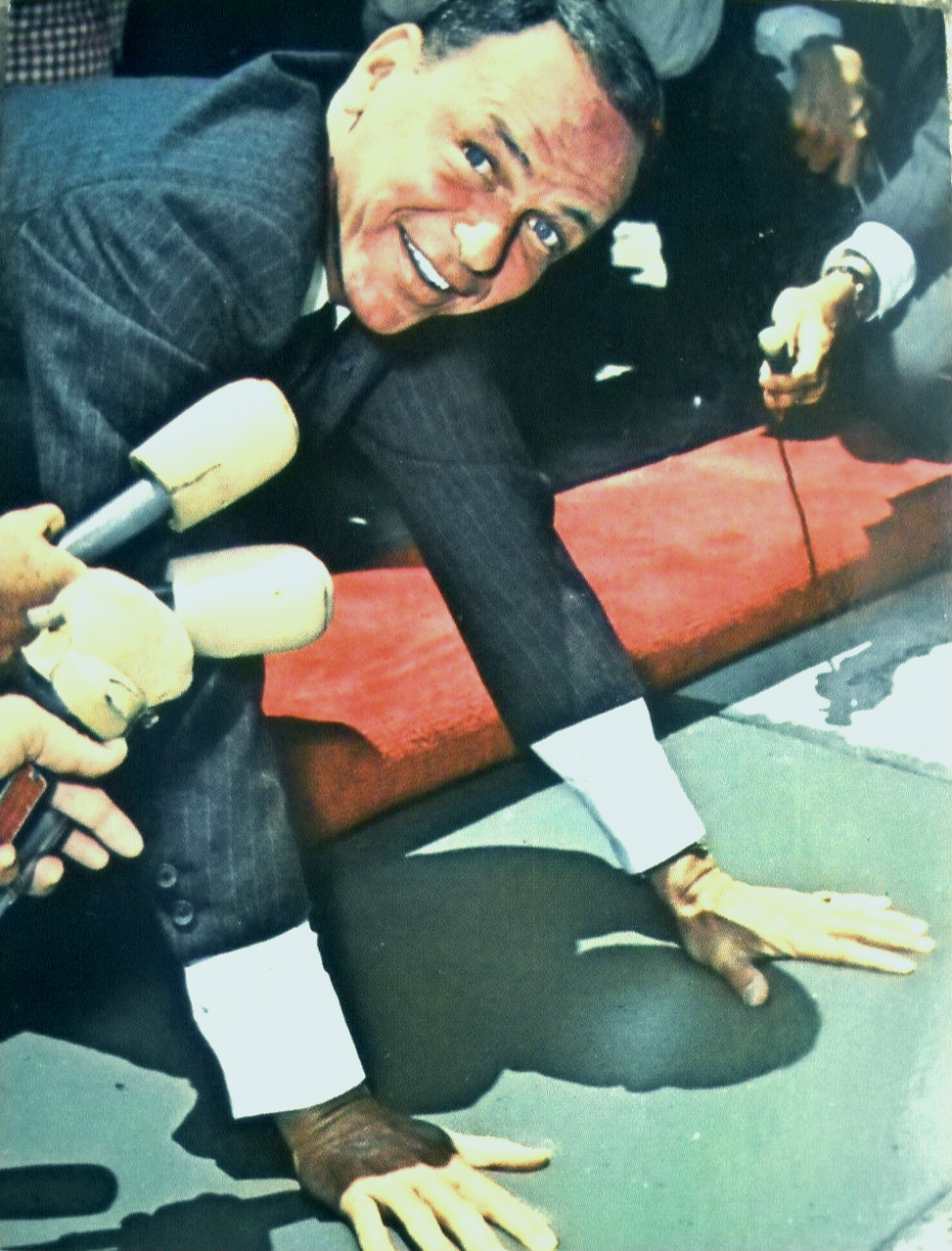
Sinatra at the Grauman's Chinese Theatre in 1965

Sinatra left a vast legacy of recordings, from his very first sides with the Harry James orchestra in 1939, the vast catalogs at Columbia in the 1940s, Capitol in the 1950s, and Reprise from the 1960s onwards, up to his 1994 album Duets II.

Some of his best known recorded songs include:

- Great American Songbook entries such as "Night and Day", "I've Got You Under My Skin", and "Fly Me To The Moon"
- Comic numbers such as "Love and Marriage" (used as the theme for American television comedy Married... with Children)
- Torch songs such as "One for My Baby", "Angel Eyes", and "Drinking Again"
- "It Was a Very Good Year" and "Summer Wind", which capture his mid-1960s persona of sentimental nostalgia
- "That's Life", "My Way", and "New York, New York", which convey his late-stage attitude of bombastic defiance.

Three of his songs made No. 1 on the Billboard Hot 100 after the advent of the rock and roll era: "Learnin' the Blues" (1955), "Strangers in the Night" (1966), and "Somethin' Stupid" (1967), the last a duet with daughter Nancy.

Of all his many albums, Sinatra at the Sands, recorded live in Las Vegas in 1966, with Sinatra in his prime, backed by Count Basie's big band, remains his most popular and is still a big seller. Whether in nightclubs, casinos, arenas, or stadiums, Sinatra was one of the most mesmeric entertainers of the twentieth century, capable of turning the largest venue into a simulacrum of an intimate club. There are, however, few recordings or videos of his concerts. In addition to the Sands performance with Basie, three performances of Sinatra at the very peak of his career were captured: With Red Norvo Quintet: Live In Australia, 1959, Sinatra '57 in Concert, a performance in Seattle with an orchestra conducted by Nelson Riddle and Sinatra & Sextet: Live in Paris, recorded in June 1962.

Sinatra is also credited with putting out perhaps the first concept album. 1955's In the Wee Small Hours is the prime example: a set of songs specifically recorded for the album, using only ballads, organized around a central mood of late-night isolation and aching lost love (supposedly due to his separation from Ava Gardner), with a now-classic album cover reflecting the theme. Rolling Stone magazine later named In the Wee Small Hours as No. 100 on its list of the 500 best albums of all time, an impressive showing given that its rankings reflect the outlook of the rock generation.

The following year's Songs For Swingin' Lovers took an alternate tack, recording existing pop standards in a hipper, jazzier fashion, revealing an overall exuberance; Rolling Stone placed it No. 306 on the above list.

It was the advent of the long-playing record that opened the door to these famous concept albums of the 1950s, but Sinatra's first efforts in this direction go back to the Columbia years and The Voice, when the 78 rpm disc made "album" less of a metaphor than it would become with the single-disc LPs of the 1950s. The Voice of Frank Sinatra was released on March 4, 1946 — it was re-issued as a 10" record in 1958. Four more albums would follow over the next five years, as would a Christmas album and a project in which Sinatra conducted the songs of Alec Wilder.

Other notable Sinatra albums include Where Are You? from 1957, which was his first stereo album and his first album recorded with Gordon Jenkins, Frank Sinatra Sings for Only the Lonely (1958), a bleak, introspective album, which Sinatra later claimed was his finest work.

The lavish The Concert Sinatra (1963) offered re-recordings of "Ol' Man River" and "You'll Never Walk Alone", backed by a 73-piece orchestra. 1965's September of My Years, according to critic Stephen Holden "summed up the punchy sentimentality of a whole generation of American men". Francis Albert Sinatra & Antonio Carlos Jobim (1967) was a late foray into bossa nova, with Antonio Carlos Jobim.

1973's comeback album Ol' Blue Eyes Is Back was Sinatra's first album after being away from recording for three years; 1980's Trilogy: Past Present Future was an ambitious triple album using three arrangers that attempted to portray the past, present, and future of his career.

1981's She Shot Me Down is sometimes considered the last great Sinatra album. A collection of what Sinatra called "saloon songs", it includes Alec Wilder's "A Long Night".

Speaking to Robin Douglas-Home in 1961, Sinatra said, with regards to the making of his many concept albums, "First I pick the mood for an album, and perhaps pick a title. Or perhaps it might be that I had that title and then picked the mood to fit it... Then I get a shortlist of maybe sixty possible songs and out of these I pick twelve to record. Next comes the pacing of the album, which is vitally important... Once we choose songs that will be in a particular album, I'll sit with Bill Miller, my pianist, and find the proper key. Then I will meet with the orchestrator... Usually we wind up doing it the way the arranger feels it should be done, because he understands more than I do about it..."

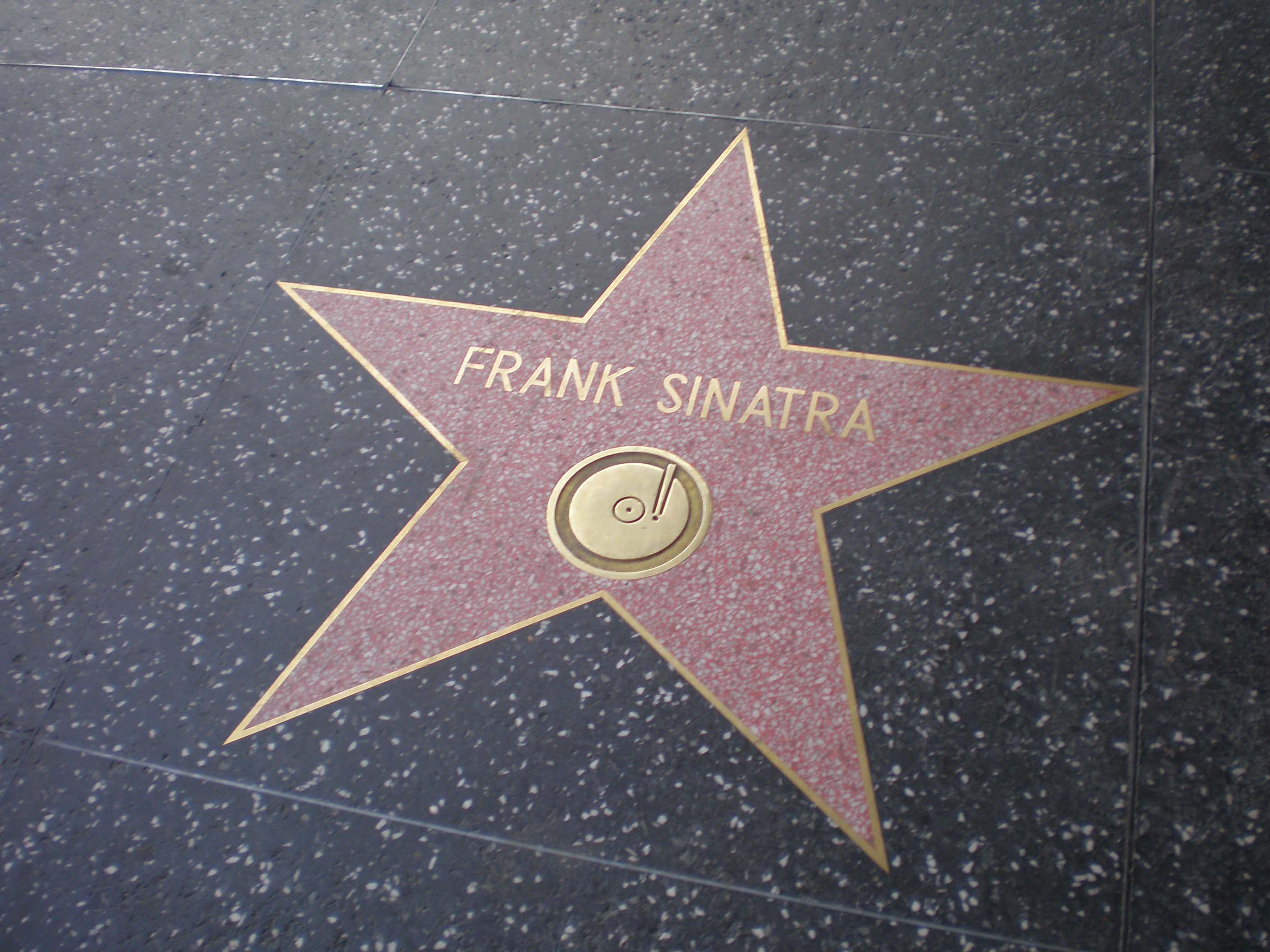
Sinatra's star for music on the Hollywood Walk of Fame

== Charts and hits ==
Frank Sinatra holds the unique distinction of singing on the first Billboard No. 1 single, "I'll Never Smile Again" (1940) — which sold 900,000 copies — and had the first ever No. 1 album in the UK, Songs For Swingin' Lovers (July 28, 1956). This same album is also the only album to chart among the UK top twenty singles, peaking at No. 12 on June 15, 1956. In 1959, the album Come Dance with Me! also entered the UK singles chart peaking at No. 30 the same week it would start a 30-week run on the album chart, going as high as No. 2.

From his first released single in 1940 — as the singer with Tommy Dorsey's band — to the 1980 release of "Theme from New York, New York", Frank Sinatra had 209 hits on Billboard's pop singles charts. Of those, 127 made the Top Twenty, 70 made the Top Ten and 10 reached the No. 1 position — "I'll Never Smile Again" (1940), "There Are Such Things" (1942), "In the Blue of the Evening" (1943), "All or Nothing at All" (1944), "Oh What It Seemed To Be" (1945), "Five Minutes More" (1946), "Mam'selle" (1947), "Learning the Blues" (1955), "Strangers in the Night" (1966) and "Somethin' Stupid" (1967).

Of Sinatra's 56 Top Twenty albums on Billboard's pop album charts, 42—including soundtracks — reached the Top Ten and 6 made the No. 1 position — The Voice of Frank Sinatra (1946), Come Fly With Me (1958), Frank Sinatra Sings for Only the Lonely (1958), Come Dance with Me! (1959), Nice 'n' Easy (1960) and Strangers in the Night (1966). He also has the longest time span of charting Top Ten albums on the Billboard album chart, 62 years with The Voice of Frank Sinatra going to No. 1 in 1946, and Nothing But the Best going to No. 2 in 2008.

Sinatra's 1958 album Frank Sinatra Sings for Only the Lonely spent 120 weeks on Billboard's album chart, peaking at No. 1. His next album, Come Dance with Me! (1959) spent 140 weeks on Billboard, peaking at No. 2.

"My Way" (1969) is the longest charting U.K. single of all time, with 122 weeks spent on the chart, peaking at number 5. The single re-entered the chart 8 times between 1970 and 1972. A 1995 re-release spent 2 weeks on the chart.

In the UK, 42 Sinatra albums have made the Top Ten. Fifty-four Sinatra albums have made the Top Twenty, the longest charting of those albums being the 1997 compilation My Way: The Very Best of Frank Sinatra, which, to date, has charted for 128 weeks achieving 5 x platinum status. Six of Sinatra's albums reached the No. 1 position on the UK album chart, with a further five peaking at No. 2.

== See also ==
- Alphabetical list of songs recorded by Frank Sinatra
- Frank Sinatra discography
- List of Frank Sinatra's awards and accolades
