= Star vehicle =

Film which is produced for a specific movie star

In the motion picture industry, a star vehicle (or simply vehicle) is a film written or produced for a specific star, either to further their career or simply to profit from their current popularity. It is designed to optimally display that star's particular talents or personal appeal. The term is also applied to stage plays and television programs. In some cases, a performer may produce their own star vehicle as self-promotion or a vanity project.

== History ==
Richard Dyer, who extensively studied the phenomenon of movie stars, defined the vehicle phenomenon in his 1979 book Stars:

The vehicle might provide a character of the type associated with the star (e.g. Monroe's "dumb blonde" roles, Garbo's melancholic romantic roles); a situation, setting or generic context associated with the star (e.g. Garbo in relationships with married men, Wayne in westerns); or opportunities for the star to do their "thing" (most obviously in the case of musical stars – e.g. a wistful solo number for Judy Garland, an extended ballet sequence for Gene Kelly – but also, for instance, opportunities to display Monroe's body and wiggle walk [and] scenes of action in Wayne's films).

Under the old studio system, vehicles were sometimes created for a promising young, inexperienced, or imported actor who had signed a long-term contract with a major studio. By showcasing that actor's talents, the vehicle was an attempt to create another bankable star bound to the studio until their contract expired.

== Usage ==
Musicals and music-themed films have commonly used the star vehicle format to capitalize on the popularity of their performer. Among the earliest examples is The Jazz Singer (1927), which drew on the popularity of Al Jolson. Elvis Presley was perhaps the most prolific star vehicle performer, featured in 25 films between 1956 and 1969. While Presley's films were a commercial success, they mostly failed to attract critical acclaim, being made primarily as a platform for his musical performances. On the other hand, Frank Sinatra is noted as a performer whose filmography strengthened his musical popularity and critical credibility. Although his first leading-role film, Meet Danny Wilson (1952), did not perform well, his acting career reached a turnaround in the non-musical From Here to Eternity (1953), from which he went on to make over 40 musical and non-musical films.
