= The Man and His Music (TV program) =

- DVD cover
- Genre: Television special
- Based on: Frank Sinatra's music
- Written by: Paul Keyes
- Directed by: Clark Jones
- Creative director: Bob Keene
- Starring: Frank Sinatra; Count Basie
- Music by: Count Basie Orchestra; Don Costa Orchestra
- Country of origin: United States
- Original language: English

Production
- Producers: Paul Keyes; Joe Kay
- Production location: The Burbank Studios
- Editor: Bill Breshears
- Running time: 60 minutes
- Production company: Bristol Productions

Original release
- Network: NBC
- Release: November 22, 1981

The Man and His Music is a 1981 NBC television special by American singer Frank Sinatra. The special is based solely on selections from the more than 100 albums record by Sinatra. Count Basie and his orchestra joined Sinatra for two numbers. The special was released to video on March 31, 1992.

== Background ==
Producer Paul Keyes said that Sinatra originally wanted to do a live concert from Carnegie Hall, but Keyes talked him out of that idea, explaining to Sinatra that the expenses associated with such a production would be huge. Instead, Keyes suggested to Sinatra they film the special at The Burbank Studios with no audience present. The set list was picked from the 100-plus albums Sinatra has recorded, and his performance was backed by a 50-piece orchestra that featured a string ensemble of 30 musicians. Count Basie and his orchestra played with him for two tunes, "The Best Is Yet to Come" and "Pennies from Heaven". The show was filmed in October 1981, and was then broadcast on NBC on November 22, 1981. The special was released to video on March 31, 1992.

== Set list ==
1. "A Lovely Way to Spend an Evening" [Instrumental]
2. "Nice 'n' Easy"
3. "The One I Love (Belongs to Somebody Else)"
4. "Pennies from Heaven"
5. "I Loved Her"
6. "The Girl from Ipanema" (with Tony Mottola)
7. "At Long Last Love"
8. "Something"
9. "Monday Morning Quarterback"
10. "The Best Is Yet to Come"
11. "(We Had a) Good Thing Going (Going Gone)"
12. "Say Hello"
13. "I Get a Kick Out of You"
14. "Theme from New York, New York"
15. "Thanks for the Memory"

== Personnel ==
- Frank Sinatra – Vocals
- Don Costa – Conductor
- Vincent Falcone Jr. – Piano
- Tony Mottola – Guitar
- Gene Cherico – Bass
- Irv Cottler – Drums
- Count Basie and His Orchestra

== Reception ==
The special performed poorly in the Nielsen Ratings, only placing 48 out of 65, and according to Kitty Kelley, NBC refused to renew Sinatra's contract for any more options for television specials or shows. Music critic John O'Connor wrote in The New York Times that the special "provided the acclaimed performer with one of his most tasteful and effective showcases ... Sinatra is at the top of his form and obviously enjoying himself". O'Connor also noted how at the end of the special, Sinatra "carefully and generously gives credits to the composers and arrangers, saying at the end, 'I hope tonight you marveled along with me at the many talents behind the songs'".

Yardena Arar from the Associated Press wrote that "there are no frills on this hour-long show, no pretty girls, no location shooting, no comedians, no studio audience, no canned laughter, no applause ... what remains is simple and elegant ... Sinatra, impeccable in black tie, chats briefly about each of 14 tunes culled from the albums he's done over the years ... and then it really is just that: the man and his music". She also highlighted the "one eminently appropriate guest - Count Basie and his orchestra," who performed two songs with Sinatra.

American journalist Kay Gardella of the New York Daily News recalls talking to producer Paul Keyes, who goes back with Sinatra a long time, and Keyes telling her how he originally met Sinatra when he was just 14-years-old in Portland, Maine, trying to get his autograph at a venue where Sinatra was playing with Tommy Dorsey and his band. In her review of the special, she said it "struck a nostalgic note ... with Sinatra's albums shown in big blowups in the background, and a fluid set ... which created a free and open framework in which Sinatra can work". She especially liked his performance of "Something", and complimented Tony Mottola on guitar, who accompanied Sinatra on "The Girl from Ipanema". Overall, she said "Sinatra looks terrific, and visually, it's different and good TV".

British author John Frayn Turner wrote in his 2004 book, Frank Sinatra, that "Count Basie and his orchestra accompanied Sinatra in a distinguished manner ... the two men clearly loved one another – musically and platonically – so that the result was really forgone". In a personal commentary about Sinatra, Turner said that "he has enriched our existence, given us great joy ... as long as Sinatra is singing, our world is secure". In a contemporary review of the video that was released, Heather Phares from AllMusic said "Sinatra's voice isn't quite at its peak and some of the song selections haven't aged well, his renditions of "Something," "Thanks for the Memory," and "Theme From 'New York, New York'" are still impressive, and fans will still want the last chapter of The Man and His Music in their collections".

== See also ==
- Frank Sinatra: A Man and His Music (1965 television special)
- Frank Sinatra's recorded legacy
