= Sylvia Is! =

Studio album by Sylvia Syms with Kenny Burrell
- Released: 1965
- Recorded: August 11 & 13, 1965
- Studio: Van Gelder Studio, Englewood Cliffs, New Jersey
- Genre: Jazz
- Length: 41:21
- Label: Prestige; PR 7439
- Producer: Cal Lampley

Sylvia Syms chronology
The Fabulous Sylvia Syms (1964)	Sylvia Is! (1965)	For Once in My Life (1967)

Kenny Burrell chronology
Guitar Forms (1965)	Sylvia Is! (1965)	The Tender Gender (1966)

Sylvia Is! is an album by vocalist Sylvia Syms with guitarist Kenny Burrell recorded in 1965 and released on the Prestige label.

== Reception ==
Professional ratings
Review scores
Source	Rating
Allmusic	3/5 stars

Allmusic awarded the album 3 stars stating "Sylvia Syms was one of the top cabaret singers, uplifting a wide variety of interesting songs throughout her career... because Syms does not improvise, this CD reissue is more for fans of cabaret than for followers of jazz".

== Track listing ==
1. "As Long as I Live" (Harold Arlen, Ted Koehler) – 3:04
2. "More Than You Know" (Edward Eliscu, Billy Rose, Vincent Youmans) – 4:02
3. "(I'm Afraid) The Masquerade Is Over" (Herb Magidson, Allie Wrubel) – 3:12
4. "How Insensitive" (Norman Gimbel, Antônio Carlos Jobim) – 3:51
5. "Smile" (Charlie Chaplin) – 3:43
6. "If You Could See Me Now" (Tadd Dameron, Carl Sigman) – 3:34
7. "Meditation" (Gimbel, Jobim) – 3:21
8. "Cuando Te Fuiste de Mi" (Robert Lee Manrique) – 3:54
9. "God Bless the Child" (Billie Holiday, Arthur Herzog, Jr.) – 2:55
10. "Wild Is the Wind" (Dimitri Tiomkin, Ned Washington) – 3:04
11. "You Are Always in My Heart" (Ernesto Lecuona, Kim Gannon) – 3:48
12. "Brazil" (Ary Barroso, Bob Russell) – 2:53
- Recorded at Van Gelder Studio in Englrewood Cliffs, New Jersey on August 11, 1965 (tracks 1–3, 5, 6 & 9) – and August 13, 1965 (tracks 4, 7, 8 & 10–12)

== Personnel ==
- Sylvia Syms – vocals
- Kenny Burrell – guitar
- Milt Hinton – bass
- Osie Johnson – drums
- Bucky Pizzarelli – guitar (tracks 4, 7, 8 & 10–12)
- Willie Rodriguez – percussion (tracks 4, 7, 8 & 10–12)
