= Frank Sinatra Conducts Music from Pictures and Plays =

Studio album by Frank Sinatra
- Released: 1962
- Recorded: July 1962, KHJ Studios, Hollywood
- Genre: Jazz
- Length: 43:59
- Label: Reprise
- Producer: Voyle Gilmore

Frank Sinatra chronology
Sleep Warm (1958)	Frank Sinatra Conducts Music from Pictures and Plays (1962)	Syms by Sinatra (1982)

Frank Sinatra Conducts Music from Pictures and Plays is a 1962 studio album conducted by Frank Sinatra, and arranged by Harry Sukman.

This was the first album that Sinatra conducted for his new record label, Reprise Records.

Professional ratings
Review scores
Source	Rating
Allmusic	link

== Track listing ==
1. "All the Way" (Sammy Cahn, Jimmy Van Heusen) – 4:14
2. "An Affair to Remember (Our Love Affair)" (Harry Warren, Leo McCarey, Harold Adamson) – 4:05
3. "Laura" (David Raksin, Johnny Mercer) – 4:21
4. "Tammy" (Jay Livingston, Ray Evans) – 2:38
5. "Moon River" (Henry Mancini, Mercer) – 4:29
6. "Exodus" (Ernest Gold) – 3:36
7. "Little Girl Blue" (Richard Rodgers, Lorenz Hart) – 4:57
8. "Maria" (Leonard Bernstein, Stephen Sondheim) – 3:58
9. "Something Wonderful" (Rodgers, Oscar Hammerstein II) – 4:38
10. "I've Grown Accustomed to Her Face" (Alan Jay Lerner, Frederick Loewe) – 4:38
11. "The Girl That I Marry" (Irving Berlin) – 4:01
12. "If Ever I Would Leave You" (Lerner, Loewe) – 3:57

== Personnel ==
- Frank Sinatra – conductor
