= For Once in My Life (Sylvia Syms album) =

Studio album by Sylvia Syms
- Released: 1967
- Recorded: March 9 and April 18, 1967
- Studio: Van Gelder Studio, Englewood Cliffs, NJ
- Genre: Jazz
- Length: 30:35
- Label: Prestige; PR 7489
- Producer: Cal Lampley

Sylvia Syms chronology
Sylvia Is! (1965)	For Once in My Life (1967)	Love Lady (1970)

For Once in My Life is an album by American vocalist Sylvia Syms recorded in 1967 and released on the Prestige label.

== Reception ==
Professional ratings
Review scores
Source	Rating
Allmusic	3/5 stars

Allmusic awarded the album 3 stars stating "The renditions are mostly pretty brief and instantly forgettable. Not one of Sylvia Syms' more significant sets".

== Track listing ==
1. "Vaya con Dios" (Inez James, Buddy Pepper, Larry Russell) – 4:05
2. "Who (Will Take My Place)?" (Charles Aznavour, Herbert Kretzmer) – 3:20
3. "You Don't Have to Say You Love Me" (Pino Donaggio, Vito Pallavicini, Vicki Wickham, Simon Napier-Bell) – 2:52
4. "You Don't Know What Love Is" (Gene de Paul, Don Raye) – 4:07
5. "Games That Lovers Play" (Larry Kusic, James Last, Günter Loose, Eddie Snyder) – 2:50
6. "For Once in My Life" (Ron Miller, Orlando Murden) – 2:45
7. "Solitaire" (Steve Allen, Erroll Garner) – 1:55
8. "Yesterday" (Lennon–McCartney) – 3:15
9. "I Will Wait for You" (Jacques Demy, Norman Gimbel, Michel Legrand) – 2:26
10. "Don't Take Your Love from Me" (Henry Nemo) – 3:00
- Recorded at Van Gelder Studio in Englewood Cliffs, New Jersey on March 9, 1967 (tracks 1, 5 & 9) and April 18, 1967 (tracks 2–4, 6–8 & 10)

== Personnel ==
- Sylvia Syms – vocals
- Jerome Richardson – flute, alto flute (tracks 1, 5 & 9)
- Johnny "Hammond" Smith – organ
- Gene Bertoncini (tracks 1, 5 & 9), Bucky Pizzarelli (tracks 1, 5 & 9), Thornel Schwartz (tracks 2–4, 6–8 & 10)

– guitar

- Sam Bruno (tracks 1, 5 & 9), Charles Wellsley (tracks 2–4, 6–8 & 10) – bass
- Bobby Rosengarden (tracks 1, 5 & 9), John Harris (tracks 2–4, 6–8 & 10) – drums
- Richie "Pablo" Landrum – congas (tracks 2–4, 6–8 & 10)
