= Syms by Sinatra =

Studio album by Sylvia Syms
- Released: 1982
- Genre: Jazz
- Length: 38:27
- Label: Reprise
- Producer: Frank Sinatra, Don Costa

Sylvia Syms chronology
She Loves to Hear the Music (1978)	Syms by Sinatra (1982)	Then Along Came Bill: A Tribute to Bill Evans (1989)

Frank Sinatra chronology
Frank Sinatra Conducts Music from Pictures and Plays (1962)	Syms by Sinatra (1982)	Whats New? (1983)

Syms by Sinatra is a 1982 album by Sylvia Syms, arranged by Don Costa, and conducted by Frank Sinatra.

== Track listing ==
1. "Hooray for Love" (Harold Arlen, Leo Robin)
2. "All My Tomorrows" (Sammy Cahn, Jimmy Van Heusen)
3. "By Myself" (Arthur Schwartz, Howard Dietz)
4. "You Go to My Head" (J. Fred Coots, Haven Gillespie)
5. "Close Enough for Love" (Johnny Mandel, Paul Williams)
6. "Them There Eyes" (Maceo Pinkard, William Tracey, Doris Tauber)
7. "Someone to Light Up My Life" (Antônio Carlos Jobim, Gene Lees, Vinicius de Moraes)
8. "I Thought About You" (Johnny Mercer, Van Heusen)
9. "You Must Believe in Spring" (Alan Bergman, Marilyn Bergman, Michel Legrand, Jacques Demy)
10. "Old Devil Moon" (E.Y. Harburg, Burton Lane)

== Personnel ==
- Sylvia Syms - vocals
- Frank Sinatra - conductor
- Don Costa - arranger
- Vincent Falcone Jr.
