= Sleep Warm =

Studio album by Dean Martin
- Released: March 2, 1959
- Recorded: October 13–15, 1958
- Studios: 1750 N. Vine Street, Hollywood
- Genre: Easy listening
- Length: 37:04
- Label: Capitol
- Producer: Lee Gillette

Dean Martin chronology
Pretty Baby (1957)	Sleep Warm (1959)	A Winter Romance (1959)

Frank Sinatra chronology
The Man I Love (1957)	Sleep Warm (1958)	Frank Sinatra Conducts Music From Pictures And Plays (1962)

Professional ratings
Review scores
Source	Rating
Allmusic	4/5 stars

Sleep Warm is the fourth studio album by Dean Martin for Capitol Records in three sessions between October 13, 1958 and October 15, 1958 with arrangements by Pete King and orchestra conducted by Frank Sinatra. Described in the liner notes as a "beguiling set of lullabies for moderns," the selections follow a "bedtime" concept with several of the song titles containing the words "dream" and/or "sleep."

The completed album was released March 2, 1959. In 1965 Capitol Records re-released an 11-track version of Sleep Warm under the title Dean Martin Sings/Sinatra Conducts.

== Track listing ==
=== LP ===
Capitol Records Catalog Number (S) T-1150

==== Side A ====
Track	Song title	Written by	Recording date	Session information	Time
1.	"Sleep Warm"	Lew Spence, Marilyn Keith and Alan Bergman	October 14, 1958	Session 7333; Master 30400	3:51
2.	"Hit the Road to Dreamland"	Harold Arlen and Johnny Mercer	October 15, 1958	Session 7266; Master 30150	2:51
3.	"Dream"	Johnny Mercer	October 13, 1958	Session 7322; Master 30354	3:20
4.	"Cuddle Up a Little Closer"	Karl Hoschna and Otto Harbach	October 13, 1958	Session 7322; Master 30357	3:12
5.	"Sleepy Time Gal"	Ange Lorenzo, Richard A. Whiting, Joseph R. Alden and Raymond B. Egan	October 15, 1958	Session 7266; Master 30147	2:51
6.	"Good Night Sweetheart"	Ray Noble, Jimmy Campbell and Reg Connelly	October 13, 1958	Session 7322; Master 30356	3:10

==== Side B ====
Track	Song title	Written by	Recording date	Session information	Time
1.	"All I Do Is Dream of You"	Nacio Herb Brown and Arthur Freed	October 15, 1958	Session 7266; Master 30149	2:46
2.	"Let's Put Out the Lights (And Go To Sleep)"	Herman Hupfeld	October 14, 1958	Session 7333; Master 30401	2:45
3.	"Dream a Little Dream of Me"	Wilbur Schwandt, Fabian Andre and Gus Kahn	October 13, 1958	Session 7322; Master 30355	3:16
4.	"Wrap Your Trouble in Dreams (And Dream Your Troubles Away)"	Ted Koehler, Harry Barris and Billy Moll	October 15, 1958	Session 7266; Master 30148	2:59
5.	"Goodnight, My Love"	Mack Gordon and Harry Revel	October 14, 1958	Session 7333; Master 30403	3:03
6.	"Brahms' Lullaby"	Public Domain	October 14, 1958	Session 7333; Master 30402	3:00

=== Compact Disc ===
1996 Capitol Compact Disc Catalog Number 7243 8 37500 2 3

==== 2005 Collectors' Choice Music reissue added four more tracks to the twelve tracks on the original Capitol LP. Catalog Number WWCCM06022. ====
Track	Song title	Written by	Recording date	Session information	Time
1.	"The Sailor's Polka"	Jerry Livingston and Mack David	September 15, 1951	Session 2309; Master 9020-6	2:02
2.	"Humdinger"	Edna Lewis and Irving Fields	May 15, 1959	Session 7757; Master 31691-11	2:21
3.	"Baby Obey Me"	Jay Livingston and Ray Evans	April 28, 1950	Session 1726; Master 5923-3	2:37
4.	"Zing-A Zing-A-Boom"	Black-Out e Ze Maria and Glen Moore	March 3, 1950	Session 1646; Master 5605-4	2:16

== Personnel ==
- Dean Martin: Vocals.
- Frank Sinatra: Conductor.
- Pete King: Arranger
- Benjamin Barrett: Contractor.
- Alfred Viola: Guitar.
- Joseph G. 'Joe' Comfort: Bass.
- Alvin A Stoller: Drums (Sessions 7322 and 7333).
- William Richmond: Drums (Session 7266).
- Ken Lane: Piano.
- William Miller: Piano.
- Elizabeth Greensporn: Cello.
- Edgar 'Ed' Lustgarten: Cello (Session 7322).
- Kurt Reher: Cello (Session 7333).
- Eleanor Aller Slatkin (Session 7266).
- Kathryn Julye: Harp (Sessions 7322 and 7266).
- Stella Castellucci: Harp (Session 7333).
- Alvin Dinkin: Viola (Sessions 7322 and 7266).
- Louis Kievman: Viola (Session 7322).
- Alexander Neiman: Viola (Session 7333).
- Paul Robyn: Viola (Session 7333 and 7266).
- Victor Arno: Violin.
- Harry Bluestone: Violin (Session 7322).
- Jacques Gasselin: Violin (Session 7322).
- James Getzoff: Violin (Session 7333).
- Seymour Kramer: Violin (Session 7322).
- Carl LaMagna: Violin (Session 7322).
- Daniel 'Dan' Lube: Violin.
- Amerigo Marino: Violin.
- Alexander 'Alex' Murray: Violin (Session 7333).
- Erno Neufeld: Violin (Session 7333).
- Louis Raderman: Violin (Session 7266).
- Paul C. Shure: Violin.
- Felix Slatkin: Violin (Session 7266).
- Marshall Sosson: Violin (Session 7266).
- Gerald Vinci: Violin (Sessions 7333 and 7266).
- Jack Cave: French Horn (Sessions 7322 and 7333).
- Gus Bivona: Saxophone (Session 7266).
- Herman C. Gunkler: Saxophone (Sessions 7322 and 7333).
- Dale Issenhuth: Saxophone.
- Jules Jacob: Saxophone.
- Abraham E. Most: Saxophone.
- Theodore M. 'Ted' Nash: Saxophone (Sessions 7322 and 7333).
- Wilbur Schwartz: Saxophone (Session 7266).
- Frances L. 'Joe' Howard: Trombone (Session 7266).
- Murray McEachern: Trombone (Session 7266).
- George M. Roberts: Bass trombone (Session 7266).
- Frank F. Beach: Trumpet (Session 7266).
- Conrad Gozzo: Trumpet (Session 7266).
- Dale McMickle: Trumpet (Session 7266).
- Edwin L 'Buddy' Cole: Piano.
- Julian C. 'Matty' Matlock: Clarinet.
- Charles T. 'Chuck' Gentry: Saxophone.
- Edward R. Miller: Saxophone.
- Elmer R. 'Moe' Schneider: Trombone.
- Charles Richard 'Dick' Cathcart: Trumpet.
