= Theme from New York, New York =

1977 single by Liza Minnelli

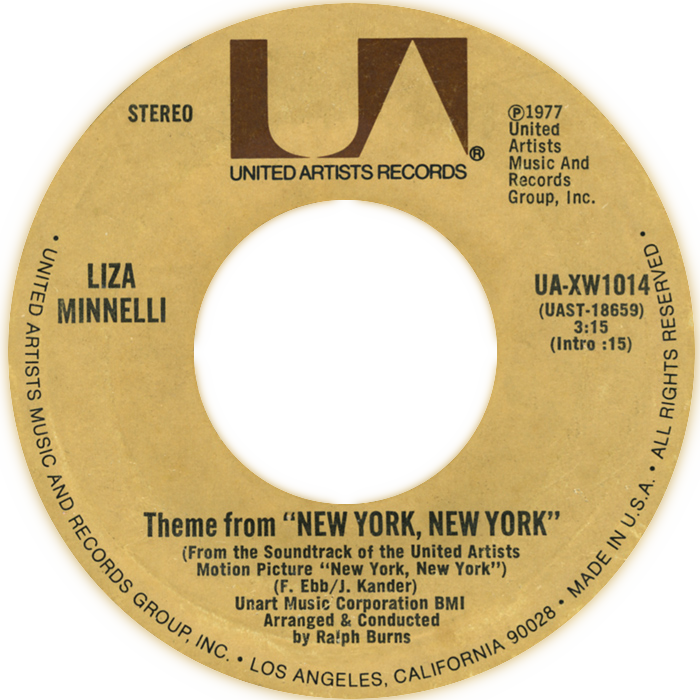
- US vinyl label

Single by Liza Minnelli

from the album New York, New York
- B-side: "Hazoy" (Ralph Burns and His Orchestra)
- Released: June 21, 1977
- Genre: Swing; show tune; jazz
- Length: 3:16
- Label: United Artists
- Composer: John Kander
- Lyricist: Fred Ebb
- Producer: Ralph Burns

"Theme from New York, New York" (often abbreviated to "New York, New York") is the theme song from the Martin Scorsese musical film New York, New York (1977), composed by John Kander, with lyrics by Fred Ebb. Liza Minnelli performs the song during the finale of the film. It was nominated for the Golden Globe Award for Best Original Song.

Two years later, Frank Sinatra covered the song, and it became closely identified with both him and New York City.

== History ==
Composer John Kander and lyricist Fred Ebb attributed the song's success to Robert De Niro, who rejected their original theme for the film because it was "too weak". They had been asked to write a handful of songs for New York, New York. When they were ready, Kander & Ebb played the songs for Martin Scorsese, Liza Minnelli and De Niro. After the recital, De Niro pulled Scorsese aside and convinced him the title song needed to be stronger.

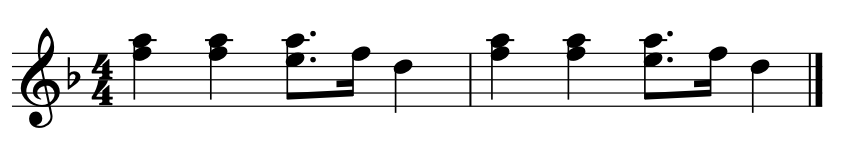
Opening vamp of "New York, New York"

The original lyrics begin, "They always say it's a nice place to visit, but I wouldn't want to live here." The melody of the discarded song is also completely different. Kander & Ebb banged out a replacement in "a very short time...and in great anger". The new song, "Theme from New York, New York", begins with one of Kander's famous vamps, this one derived from the ragtime practice of putting the melody underneath a repeated note. Liza Minnelli's performance was released as a single from the soundtrack album and peaked at number 104 on the Billboard chart.

== Frank Sinatra version ==
"Theme from New York, New York"

Single by Frank Sinatra

from the album Trilogy: Past Present Future
- B-side: "That's What God Looks Like to Me"
- Released: April 1980
- Recorded: September 19, 1979
- Genre: Jazz
- Length: 3:26
- Label: Reprise
- Composer: John Kander
- Lyricist: Fred Ebb
- Producer: Sonny Burke

Frank Sinatra singles chronology
"Night and Day" (1977)	"Theme from New York, New York" (1980)	"You and Me (We Wanted It All)" (1980)

Frank Military, a longtime associate and former employee of Frank Sinatra's publishing company, was adept at choosing songs for the singer. Military sent Sinatra a record of "New York, New York" and kept checking in with his secretary to see if he listened to it. Sinatra eventually gave the sheet music to his pianist, Vinnie Falcone, and in October 1978, he began performing it in a medley with "New York, New York" from the 1944 musical On the Town.

He hired Don Costa to create a medley of "Autumn in New York", "The Sidewalks of New York", and "Theme from New York, New York" as an overture for his act, entering to Kander's vamp. Audiences loved "New York, New York" so much that he kept moving it later into the set, which he was still closing with "My Way". It was through those performances that Sinatra developed the massive rallentando that defines his interpretation of the song and is immortalized on record. By 1980, "New York, New York" had become the closer for his performances.

Sinatra recorded the song for his triple album Trilogy: Past Present Future (1980). Don Costa received a Grammy nomination for the energetic orchestration. Sinatra occasionally performed the song live with Minnelli as a duet. Having known him all her life, Minnelli referred to Sinatra as "Uncle Frank", and teasingly pointed out that his signature song had been written for her.

Sinatra's recording peaked at number 32 on June 14, 1980, becoming his final Top 40 hit. It was also an Adult Contemporary hit, reaching number 10 in the US and number 2 in Canada. In Mexico, it reached number 1 on Notitas Musicales' Hit Parade chart in December 1981, remaining in that position for three fortnights. The song made a minor showing in the UK (number 59); however, it recharted several years later and reached number 4 in 1986. The song was nominated for a Grammy Award for Best Pop Vocal Performance, Male.

Sinatra made two more studio recordings of the song in 1981 (for his NBC TV special The Man and His Music) and 1993 (for Capitol Records). The latter recording was edited into a duet with Tony Bennett for Sinatra's Duets album.

== Lyrics ==
The first two lines of the song are:

Start spreadin' the news, I'm leavin' today
I want to be a part of it: New York, New York.

The song concludes with the lines:

If I can make it there, I'm gonna make it anywhere,
It's up to you, New York, New York.

Minnelli's original recording of the song (also used in the Tony Bennett version in Duets) uses the following closing line:

If I can make it there, I'll make it anywhere,
Come on, come through, New York, New York.

Frank Sinatra altered some of Ebb's lyrics during the recording process, likely as a mistake. During the climax, Ebb's original list of superlative titles runs, "king of the hill, head of the list, cream of the crop, and the top of the heap", which rhymes with "the city that doesn't sleep". Sinatra rendered the titles as "A-number-one, top of the list, king of the hill, A-number-one". Ebb was not fond of the revision but was deeply grateful to Sinatra for giving them an "enormous hit".

== Charts ==
Liza Minnelli version

Chart (1977)	Peak position
US Billboard Bubbling Under the Hot 100	104

Frank Sinatra version

Chart (1980–1981)	Peak position
Canada RPM Adult Contemporary	2
Mexico (Hit Parade)	1
UK	59
US Billboard Hot 100	32
US Billboard Adult Contemporary	10
US Cash Box Top 100	35

Chart (1986)	Peak position
Ireland (IRMA)	4
UK	4

== Certifications ==
Certifications for Frank Sinatra version
Region	Certification	Certified units/sales
Denmark (IFPI Danmark)	Gold	45,000^{‡}
New Zealand (RMNZ)	Gold	15,000^{‡}
United Kingdom (BPI)	Gold	500,000^{‡}
^{‡} Sales+streaming figures based on certification alone.

== Legacy ==
The song has been embraced as a celebration of New York City, and is often heard at New York City social events, such as weddings and bar mitzvahs. Many sports teams in New York City have played this song in their arenas/stadiums, but the New York Yankees are the most prominent example. It has been played over the loudspeakers at both the original and current Yankee Stadiums at the end of every Yankee home game since July 1980. Originally, Sinatra's version was played after a Yankees win, and the Minnelli version after a loss. However, due to complaints from Minnelli about her version being associated with losses, the Sinatra version was heard regardless of the game's outcome until the 2025 season, when the Yankees retired the use of Sinatra's version after home losses, opting instead to rotate different songs. Sinatra's version of the song has been traditionally played over loudspeakers at the start of the NYC Marathon on the Verrazzano-Narrows bridge since at least 2010.

Sinatra's version of the song is played, immediately after "Auld Lang Syne", every January 1 since 2004 after the Times Square Ball drops in New York, except for 2026 when a patriotic ball drop occurred, followed by The Star-Spangled Banner by the late Whitney Houston & The Florida Orchestra.

By the mid-1980s, the song was ubiquitous as the theme in commercials for Kraft's Philadelphia Cream Cheese.

While collaborating with Queen on the soundtrack to Highlander, director Russell Mulcahy begged Freddie Mercury to record "New York, New York". The singer obliged and his 30-second performance appears in the film just before the climax.

Liza Minnelli performed the song live during the July 4, 1986 ceremony marking the rededication of the Statue of Liberty after extensive renovations.

Minnelli also performed it on September 21, 2001 at Shea Stadium during the seventh-inning stretch. It was the first game in New York after the attacks on the World Trade Center. The Mets beat the Braves with a dramatic home run by Mike Piazza. It is known as the "9/11 game".

In 2004, "New York, New York" ranked #31 on AFI's 100 Years...100 Songs survey of top tunes in American cinema.

In the 2005 Arrested Development episode "Queen for a Day" Tobias Fünke starts singing the song in presence of Minnelli's character Lucille Austero, causing her to roll her eyes and complain that "everyone thinks they're Frank Sinatra."

From the 2005 season until 2020, at the Richmond County Bank Ballpark following Staten Island Yankees games, the Sinatra version was heard regardless of the game's outcome, and was formerly heard at Shea Stadium at the end of New York Mets games after the September 11, 2001 attack. Previously, Mets fans felt it was a "Yankee song", and began booing it when it was played. It first had snippets of the song played after World Series home runs by Ray Knight and Darryl Strawberry during Game 7 of the 1986 World Series. The song is also sometimes played at New York Knicks games and was played following their victory in the 2026 NBA Finals. The Sinatra version is played at the end of every New York Rangers game at Madison Square Garden. It was played at the opening faceoff of Game 7 of the 1994 Stanley Cup Final at the Garden.

The song has also been the post parade song for the Belmont Stakes from 1997 to 2009, and since 2011. Sinatra's version of the song has been played at the end of all four Super Bowls that the New York Giants have won to date, as well as before kickoff of Super Bowl XLVIII, while Minnelli's version was heard after the Giants' Super Bowl XXXV loss. Following the New York Liberty winning the 2024 WNBA Finals, Nike created an advert featuring the Statue of Liberty with the song playing in the background.

In 2013, the 1979 recording by Frank Sinatra was inducted into the Grammy Hall of Fame.

The song was the musical basis for Jimmy Picker's 1983 three-minute animated short, Sundae in New York, which won the Oscar for Best Short Film (Animated) that year, with a likeness of then-mayor Ed Koch somewhat stumbling through the song, with clay caricatures of New York-based celebrities (including Alfred E. Neuman) and finishing the song with "Basically, I think New York is very therapeutic. Hey, an apple a day is... uh... great for one's constitution!" and burying his face in a big banana split with "THE END" written on his bald head. (Koch used the same rallentando climax Sinatra used, albeit with one big difference: "A-number one, top of the list, king of the hill..." followed by his impression of Groucho Marx completing, "...and incidentally a heckuva nice guy!") In 2013, an organist played "New York, New York" as the final song of Koch's funeral.

== Parodies ==
- Swedish comedy group Galenskaparna och After Shave made a version of the song in 1985, "Borås, Borås", about Borås (the mail order center of Sweden).
- Martin Short sang a parody, "North Pole, North Pole", in the 2006 film The Santa Clause 3: The Escape Clause.
- Stephen Colbert sang a parody of the song on the 10 June 2014 episode of The Colbert Report. His version mocked New York Governor Andrew Cuomo's and California Governor Jerry Brown's wager on the result of the Stanley Cup Final between the New York Rangers and the Los Angeles Kings.
- Professional wrestling team The New Day sang a parody on an episode of WWE Raw the night after they won the Tag Team Championships at SummerSlam in 2015 at the Barclays Center in Brooklyn.
- Michael Feinstein often sings parody lyrics regarding his hatred of this song in concert.
- The animated series The Simpsons has parodied the song in multiple episodes. The 1990 episode "Dancin' Homer" features the song "Capital City", an ode to the state capital of the unnamed state the titular family lives in performed by Tony Bennett (who also performed the original song). The song is also parodied in the 2019 episode "D'oh Canada" as "Upstate New York", a deprecating look at the northern part of the state sung by Homer Simpson.
- Jewish song parody group Rechnitzer Rejects recorded a version of the song in Yiddish called Boro Park.
- In the French TV program Les Guignols, it was parodied in a skit about Osama bin Laden.
- In 2019, YouTuber and American actress Liza Koshy made a version of the song into an unofficial anthem of the Dollar Store, ironically shot in a 99 Cents Only Stores store.

== See also ==
- "I Love L.A." by Randy Newman
- "I Left My Heart in San Francisco" by Tony Bennett, who also covered "New York, New York" in a duet with Sinatra.
- "My Kind of Town", composed by Jimmy Van Heusen and Sammy Cahn
- "New York, New York' from On the Town
- "Sweet Home Chicago" by Robert Johnson
- "City of Excuses" by Joseph Gunnar is a "realistic" take on New York.
