= List of awards and nominations received by Frank Sinatra =

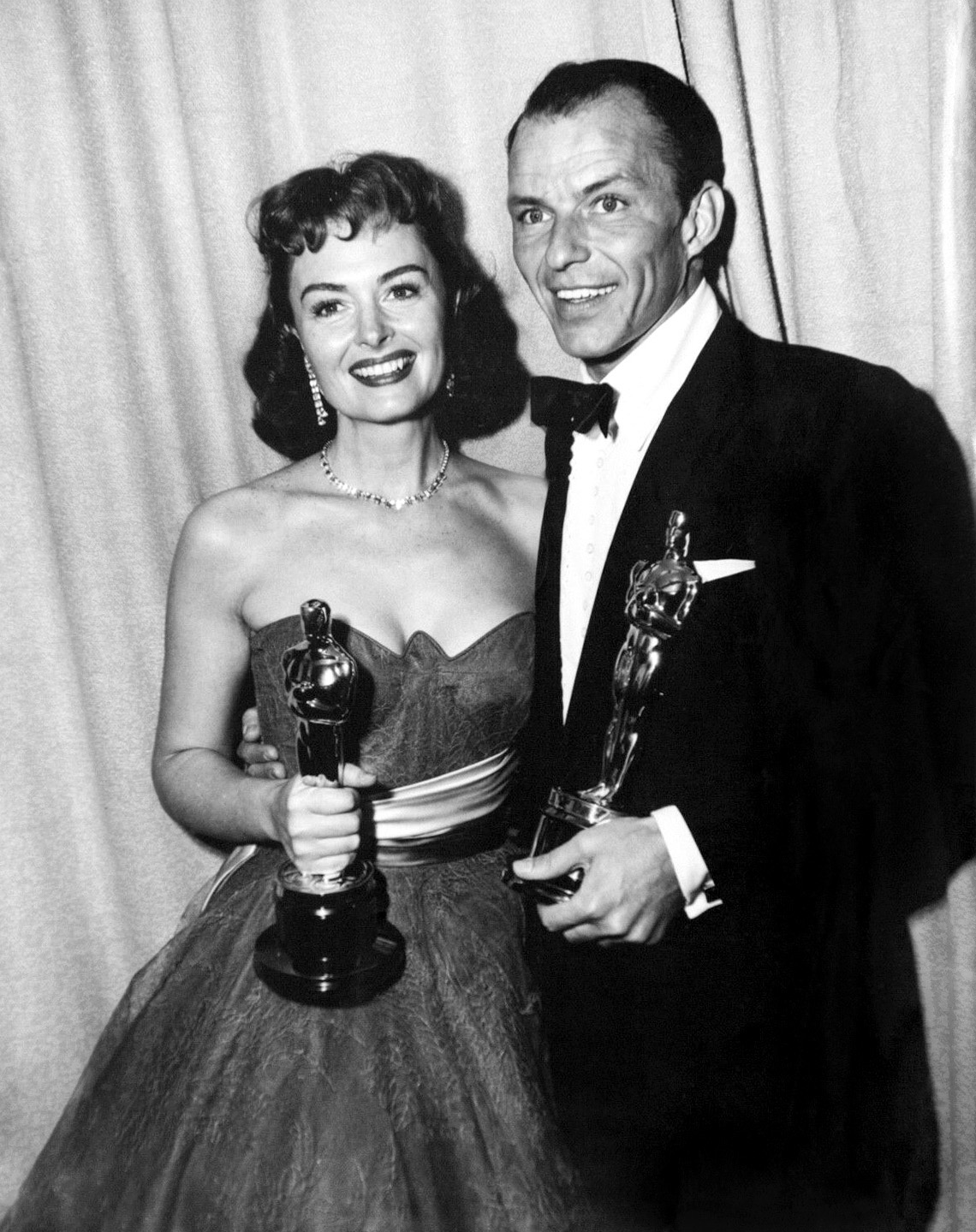
For his performance in From Here to Eternity, Sinatra (at right, beside co-star Donna Reed) received the Academy Award for Best Supporting Actor.

This article contains a list of awards and accolades won by and awarded to Frank Sinatra.

== Awards and honors ==
Presidential Medal of Freedom

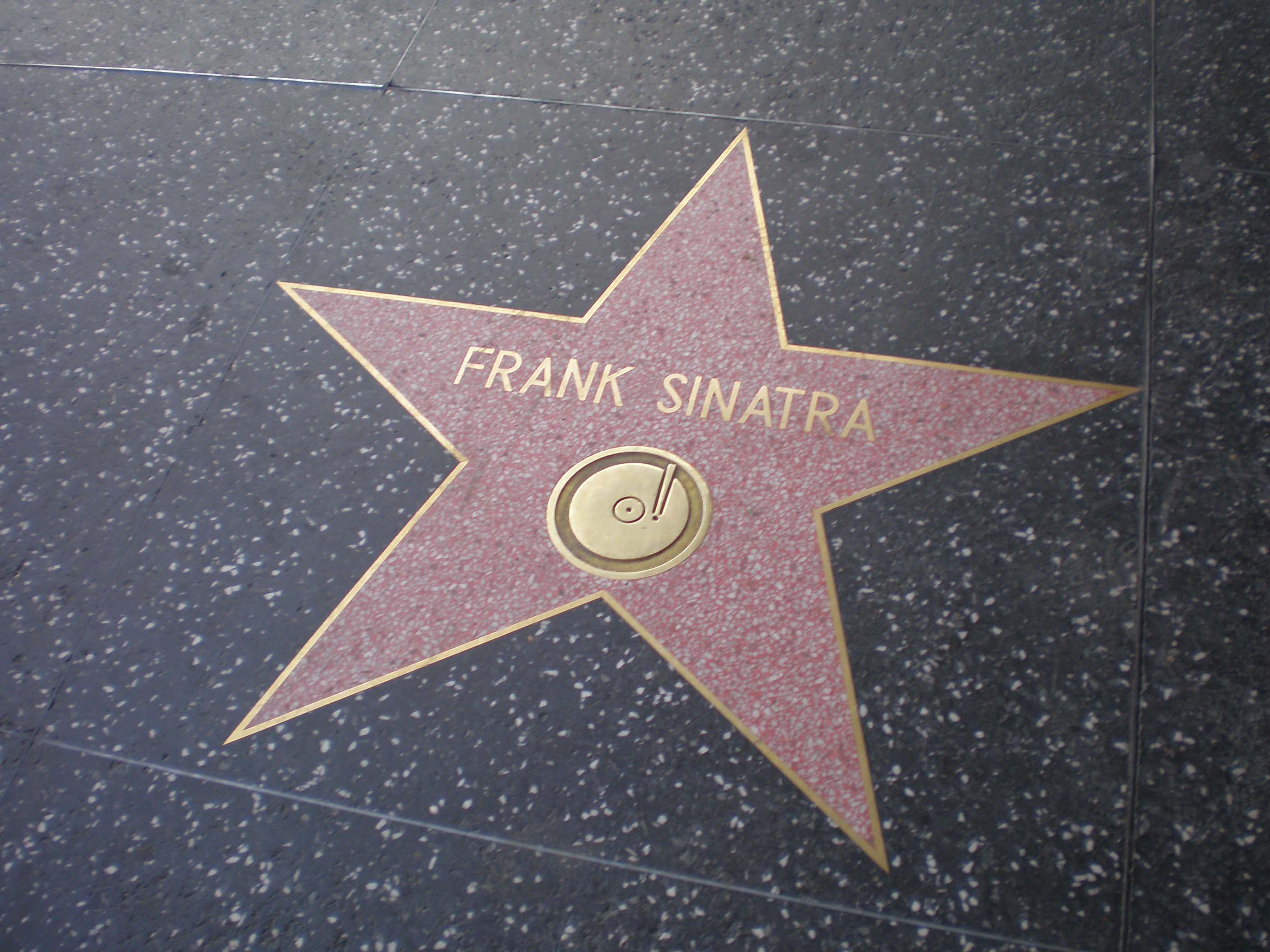
Sinatra's music star on the Hollywood Walk of Fame.

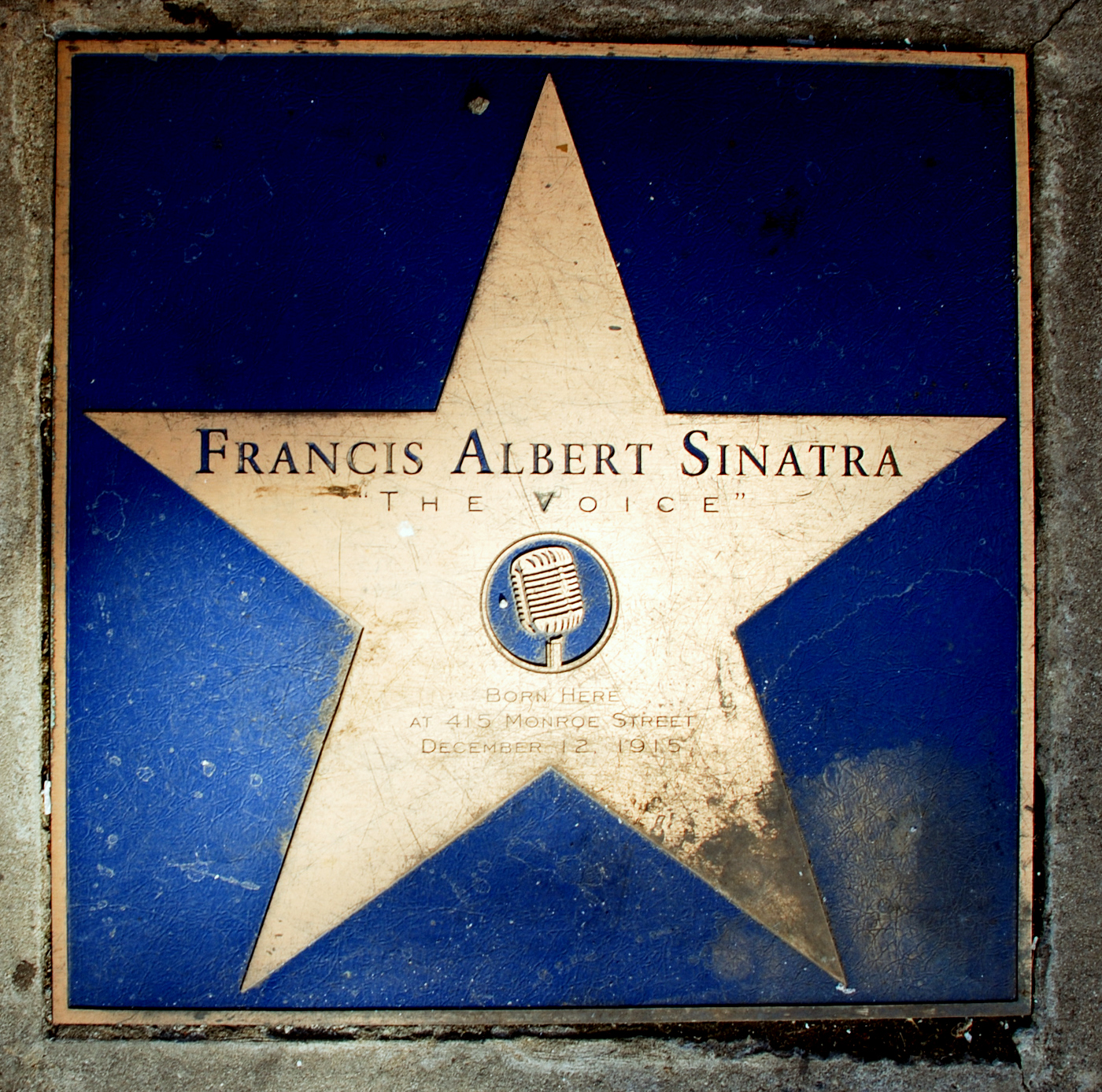
Sidewalk star in front of Sinatra's birthplace.

- 1954 Academy Award winner – Best Supporting Actor
- 13-time Grammy Award winner
- four-time Golden Globe Award winner
- 1966 Peabody Award winner
- 1971 Cecil B. DeMille Award winner
- Medal of Honour of the State of Israel (1972)
- Screen Actors Guild Life Achievement Award (1972)
- Honorary Citizen of Chicago (1975)
- Scopus Award from the American Friends of the Hebrew University of Jerusalem (1976)
- Honorary Doctorate litterarum humanarum (University of Nevada, Las Vegas, 1976)
- Grand Officer of the Order of Merit of the Italian Republic (1979)
- American Society of Composers, Authors and Publishers Pied Piper Award (Las Vegas, 1979)
- Johnny Mercer Award from the Songwriters Hall of Fame (1980)
- Big Band and Jazz Hall of Fame (class of 1980)
- National Broadcasters Hall of Fame (class of 1982)
- Kennedy Center for the Performing Arts Medal of Honor Award (1983)
- Honorary Doctorate of Fine Arts (Loyola Marymount University – 1984)
- Austrian Cross of Honour for Science and Art, 1st class (1984)
- Presidential Medal of Freedom (1985)
- Honorary Doctor of Engineering from the Stevens Institute of Technology (1985)
- NAACP Lifetime Achievement Award (1987)
- Society of Singers Lifetime Achievement Award (1990)
- Ella Award (1990)
- Distinguished Life Achievement Award (Honorary Award for lifetime achievement) of the American Cinema Awards (1992)
- Career Achievement Award (Palm Springs International Film Festival, 1993)
- Gaming Hall of Fame (class of 1997)
- Congressional Gold Medal (presented posthumously in 1998)
- American Music Award of Merit (1998)
- Named as the "Greatest Voice of the 20th Century" by BBC Radio 2 (2001)
- Each year on Sinatra's birthday, (December 12), the Empire State Building lights up with blue lights in reference to Sinatra's nickname, "Ol' Blue Eyes".
- Honorary membership of Alpha Phi Delta
- Three stars on the Hollywood Walk of Fame:
  - For Motion pictures at 1600 Vine Street
  - For Recording at 1637 Vine Street
  - For Television at 6538 Hollywood Blvd.
- Hit Parade Hall of Fame. (class of 2007)
- New Jersey Hall of Fame (class of 2008).
- Star on the Las Vegas Walk of Stars (2010).
- America Award in memory of the Italy-USA Foundation in 2015.
- Asteroid 7934 Sinatra named in his honor.

=== Film industry awards ===
Year	Nomination	Work	Won?
Academy Awards
1946	Honorary Award	The House I Live In	Yes
1954	Best Supporting Actor	From Here to Eternity	Yes
1955	Best Actor	The Man with the Golden Arm	No
1970	The Jean Hersholt Humanitarian Award	Humanitarian Award	Yes
American Cinema Awards
1992	Lifetime Achievement		Yes
BAFTA Awards
1955	Best Foreign Actor	The Man With the Golden Arm	No
1956	Best Foreign Actor	Not as a Stranger	No
Golden Apple Award
1946	Least Cooperative Actor		Yes
1951	Least Cooperative Actor		Yes
1974	Least Cooperative Actor		Yes
1977	Male Star of the Year		Yes
Golden Globes
1946	Special Award for film that "Promoted International Understanding"	The House I Live In	Yes
1954	Golden Globe Award for Best Supporting Actor - Motion Picture	From Here to Eternity	Yes
1958	Golden Globe Award for Best Actor - Motion Picture Musical or Comedy	Pal Joey	Yes
1963	Golden Globe Award for Best Actor - Motion Picture Musical or Comedy	Come Blow Your Horn	No
1971	Cecil B. DeMille Award	Lifetime Achievement	Yes
Laurel Award
1958	Golden Laurel for Top Male Musical Performance	Pal Joey	Yes
1958	Top Male Star		3rd place
1959	Golden Laurel for Top Male Dramatic Performance	Some Came Running	Yes
1959	Top Male Star		2nd place
1960	Golden Laurel for Top Male Musical Performance	Can-Can	Yes
1960	Top Male Star		3rd place
1961	Top Male Star		13th place
1962	Golden Laurel for Top Action Performance	The Devil at 4 O'Clock	2nd place
1962	Top Male Star		13th place
1963	Golden Laurel for Top Action Performance	The Manchurian Candidate	2nd place
1963	Top Male Star		6th place
1964	Top Male Star		10th place
1966	Golden Laurel for Top Action Performance	Von Ryan's Express	5th place
1967	Top Male Star		11th place
NYFCCs
1955	Best Actor	The Man With the Golden Arm	No
Palm Springs International Film Festival
1992	The Desert Palm	Lifetime Achievement	Yes
Screen Actors Guild Awards
1972	Lifetime Achievement	Lifetime Achievement	Yes

=== Academy Awards ===
Preceded by Anthony Quinn for Viva Zapata!	Academy Award for Best Supporting Actor; 1953 for From Here to Eternity	Succeeded by Edmond O'Brien for The Barefoot Contessa
Preceded by George Jessel	Jean Hersholt Humanitarian Award; 1970	Succeeded by Rosalind Russell
Preceded by Bob Hope; 34th Academy Awards	"Oscars" host 35th Academy Awards	Succeeded by Jack Lemmon; 36th Academy Awards
Preceded by John Huston, David Niven, Burt Reynolds, and Diana Ross; 46th Academy Awards	"Oscars" host 47th Academy Awards (with Sammy Davis, Jr., Bob Hope, and Shirley MacLaine)	Succeeded by Goldie Hawn, Gene Kelly, Walter Matthau, George Segal, and Robert Shaw; 48th Academy Awards

Nominated – Academy Award for Best Actor

- The Man with the Golden Arm (1955)

Nominated – Academy Award for Best Original Song

- "I Couldn't Sleep a Wink Last Night" from the motion picture Higher and Higher
- Composed by Jimmy McHugh with lyrics by Harold Adamson (sung by Frank Sinatra) (1943)

Nominated – Academy Award for Best Original Song

- "I Fall in Love too Easily" from the motion picture Anchors Aweigh
- Composed by Sammy Cahn with lyrics by Jule Styne (sung by Frank Sinatra) (1945)

Academy Award for Best Original Song

- "Three Coins in the Fountain" from the motion picture Three Coins in the Fountain
- Composed by Sammy Cahn with lyrics by Jimmy Van Heusen (sung by Frank Sinatra) (1954)

Nominated – Academy Award for Best Original Song

- "(Love Is) The Tender Trap" from the motion picture The Tender Trap
- Composed by Sammy Cahn with lyrics by Jimmy Van Heusen (sung by Frank Sinatra) (1955)

Academy Award for Best Original Song

- "All the Way" from the motion picture The Joker Is Wild
- Composed by Sammy Cahn with lyrics by Jimmy Van Heusen (sung by Frank Sinatra) (1957)

Academy Award for Best Original Song

- "High Hopes" from the motion picture A Hole in the Head
- Composed by Sammy Cahn with lyrics by Jimmy Van Heusen (sung by Frank Sinatra) (1959)

Nominated – Academy Award for Best Original Song

- "My Kind of Town" from the motion picture Robin and the 7 Hoods
- Composed by Sammy Cahn with lyrics by Jimmy Van Heusen (sung by Frank Sinatra) (1964)

=== Television industry awards ===
Year	Nomination	Work	Won?
Emmy Awards
1956	Best Male Singer		No
1969	Outstanding Variety or Musical Program	Francis Albert Sinatra Does His Thing	No
1970	Outstanding Variety or Musical Program – Variety and Popular Music	Sinatra	No
1973	Outstanding Comedy-Variety, Variety or Music Special	Ol' Blue Eyes is Back	No
Peabody Awards
1966		A Man and His Music	Yes

=== Down Beat Polls ===
- Readers' poll Male Singer of the Year sixteen times between 1941 and 1966
- Readers' poll Personality of the Year six times between 1954 and 1959
- Critics' poll Male Singer of the Year twice, in 1955 and 1957.

=== Grammy Awards ===
The Grammy Awards began in 1958, after two peaks of Sinatra's recording career had already happened, but Sinatra still won eleven Grammy Awards – his work was nominated over 30 times – in his career and has been presented with the Grammy Hall of Fame Award along with the Academy's highest honours, their Lifetime, and Legend Awards. With three wins he is one of only five artists and groups who have won the Grammy Award for Album of the Year more than once as the main credited artist.

Year	Nominated work	Award	Result
May 4, 1959 (1st Grammy Awards)	"Witchcraft"	Record of the Year	Nominated
May 4, 1959 (1st Grammy Awards)	"Come Fly with Me" and "Witchcraft"	Vocal Performance, Male	Nominated
May 4, 1959 (1st Grammy Awards)	Come Fly with Me	Album of the Year	Nominated
May 4, 1959 (1st Grammy Awards)	Frank Sinatra Sings for Only the Lonely	Album of the Year	Nominated
May 4, 1959 (1st Grammy Awards)	Frank Sinatra Sings for Only the Lonely	Best Recording Package	Won
November 29, 1959 (2nd Grammy Awards)	Come Dance with Me!	Album of the Year	Won
November 29, 1959 (2nd Grammy Awards)	Come Dance with Me!	Vocal Performance, Male	Won
November 29, 1959 (2nd Grammy Awards)	Come Dance with Me!	Special Award: Artists & Repertoire Contribution	Won
November 29, 1959 (2nd Grammy Awards)	"High Hopes"	Record of the Year	Nominated
1961 (3rd Grammy Awards)	"Nice 'n' Easy"	Record of the Year	Nominated
1961 (3rd Grammy Awards)	"Nice 'n' Easy"	Best Vocal Performance Single Record or Track, Male	Nominated
1961 (3rd Grammy Awards)	"Nice 'n' Easy"	Best Performance by a Pop Single Artist	Nominated
1961 (3rd Grammy Awards)	Nice 'n' Easy	Album of the Year	Nominated
1961 (3rd Grammy Awards)	Nice 'n' Easy	Best Vocal Performance Album, Male	Nominated
1962 (4th Grammy Awards)	"The Second Time Around"	Record of the Year	Nominated
1966 (8th Grammy Awards)	September of My Years	Album of the Year	Won
1966 (8th Grammy Awards)	"It Was a Very Good Year"	Best Vocal Performance, Male	Won
1966 (8th Grammy Awards)		Grammy Lifetime Achievement Award	Won
1967 (9th Grammy Awards)	"Strangers in the Night"	Record of the Year	Won
1967 (9th Grammy Awards)	"Strangers in the Night"	Best Vocal Performance, Male	Won
1967 (9th Grammy Awards)	A Man and His Music	Album of the Year	Won
1968 (10th Grammy Awards)	"Somethin' Stupid" (duet with Nancy Sinatra)	Record of the Year	Nominated
1968 (10th Grammy Awards)	Francis Albert Sinatra & Antonio Carlos Jobim	Album of the Year	Nominated
1968 (10th Grammy Awards)	Francis Albert Sinatra & Antonio Carlos Jobim	Best Vocal Performance, Male	Nominated
1970 (12th Grammy Awards)	"My Way"	Best Contemporary Vocal Performance, Male	Nominated
1979 (21st Grammy Awards)		Grammy Trustees Award	Won
1981 (23rd Grammy Awards)	"Theme from New York, New York"	Record of the Year	Nominated
1981 (23rd Grammy Awards)	"Theme from New York, New York"	Best Pop Vocal Performance, Male	Nominated
1981 (23rd Grammy Awards)	Trilogy: Past Present Future	Album of the Year	Nominated
1987 (29th Grammy Awards)	Portrait of an Album	Grammy Award for Best Long Form Music Video	Nominated
1995 (37th Grammy Awards)		Grammy Legend Award	Won
1995 (37th Grammy Awards)	Duets	Best Traditional Pop Vocal Performance	Nominated
1996 (38th Grammy Awards)	Duets II	Best Traditional Pop Vocal Performance	Won
1997 (39th Grammy Awards)	"My Way" (duet with Luciano Pavarotti)	Best Pop Collaboration with Vocals	Nominated
2001 (43rd Grammy Awards)	"All the Way" (duet with Celine Dion)	Best Pop Collaboration with Vocals	Nominated

=== Playboy Awards ===
- Jazz All-Star Poll Male Vocalist of the Year seven times between 1957 and 1964.

=== NME Awards ===
Year	Nominee / work	Award	Result
1955	Himself	World's Outstanding Singer	Won
1955	Himself	Outstanding American Male Singer	Won
1956	Himself	Outstanding American Male Singer	Won
1956	Himself	Outstanding Popular Singer in World	Won
