= Frank Sinatra filmography =

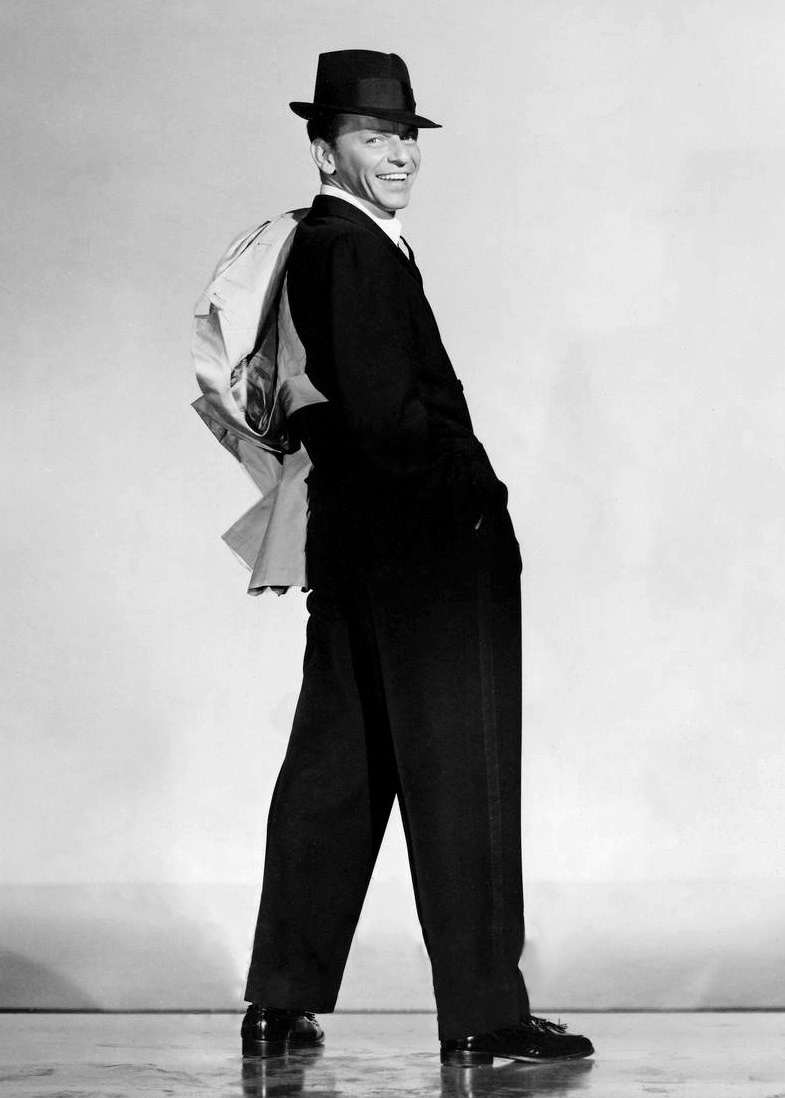
Sinatra in a publicity still for Pal Joey, 1957. According to Sinatra biographer Lew Irwin, the photo captured "the pose for which Sinatra is perhaps best remembered—the rakishly tilted head, the raincoat over his shoulder, the famous grin."

Frank Sinatra (1915–1998) was an American singer, actor, and producer who was one of the most popular and influential musical artists of the 20th century. Over the course of his acting career he created a body of work that one biographer described as being "as varied, impressive and rewarding as that of any other Hollywood star".

Sinatra began his career as a singer, initially in his native Hoboken, New Jersey, but increasing success led to a contract to perform on stage and radio across the United States. One of his earliest film roles was in the 1935 short film Major Bowes' Amateur Theatre of the Air, a spin off from the Major Bowes Amateur Hour radio show. He appeared in a full-length film in an uncredited cameo singing performance in Las Vegas Nights, singing "I'll Never Smile Again" with Tommy Dorsey's The Pied Pipers. His work with Dorsey's band also led to appearances in the full-length films Las Vegas Nights (1941) and Ship Ahoy (1942). As Sinatra's singing career grew, he appeared in larger roles in feature films, several of which were musicals, including three alongside Gene Kelly: Anchors Aweigh (1945), On the Town (1949) and Take Me Out to the Ball Game (1949). As his acting career developed further, Sinatra also produced several of the films in which he appeared, and directed one—None but the Brave—which he also produced and in which he starred.

Sinatra's film and singing careers had declined by 1952, when he was out-of-contract with both his record company and film studio. In 1953, he re-kindled his film career by targeting serious roles: he auditioned for—and won—a role in From Here to Eternity for which he won the Academy Award for Best Supporting Actor and the Golden Globe for Best Supporting Actor – Motion Picture. Other serious roles followed, including a portrayal of an ex-convict and drug addict in The Man with the Golden Arm, for which he was nominated for the Academy Award for Best Actor and the British Academy Film Award for the Best Actor in a Leading Role.

Sinatra received numerous awards for his film work. He won the Golden Globe for Best Actor – Motion Picture Musical or Comedy for Pal Joey (1957), and was nominated in the same category for Come Blow Your Horn (1963). Three of the films in which Sinatra appears, The House I Live In (1945), The Manchurian Candidate (1962) and From Here to Eternity (1953)—have been added to the Library of Congress's National Film Registry. The House I Live In—a film that opposes anti-Semitism and racism—was awarded a special Golden Globe and Academy Award. In 1970, at the 43rd Academy Awards, Sinatra was presented with the Jean Hersholt Humanitarian Award; the following year he was awarded the Golden Globe 'Cecil B. DeMille' Award.

== As actor ==
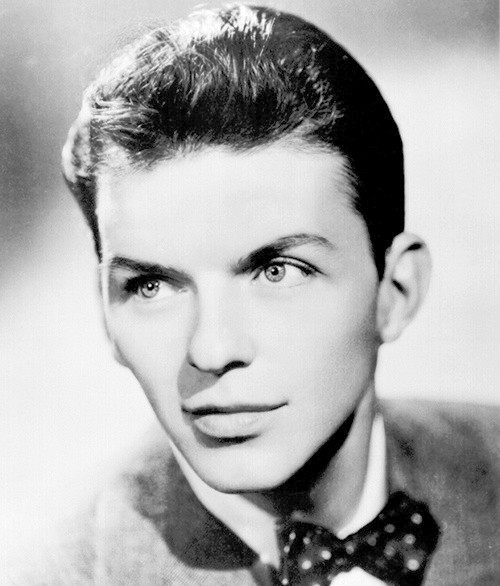
Publicity photo of Sinatra, c. 1943

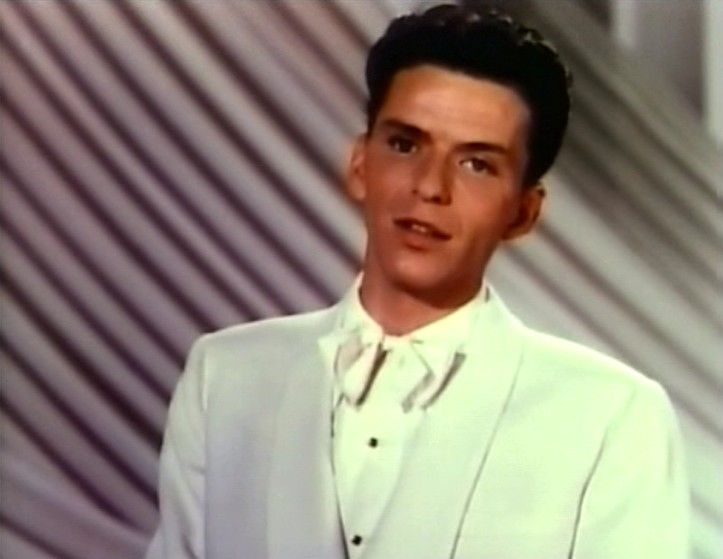
Sinatra in Till the Clouds Roll By (1946)

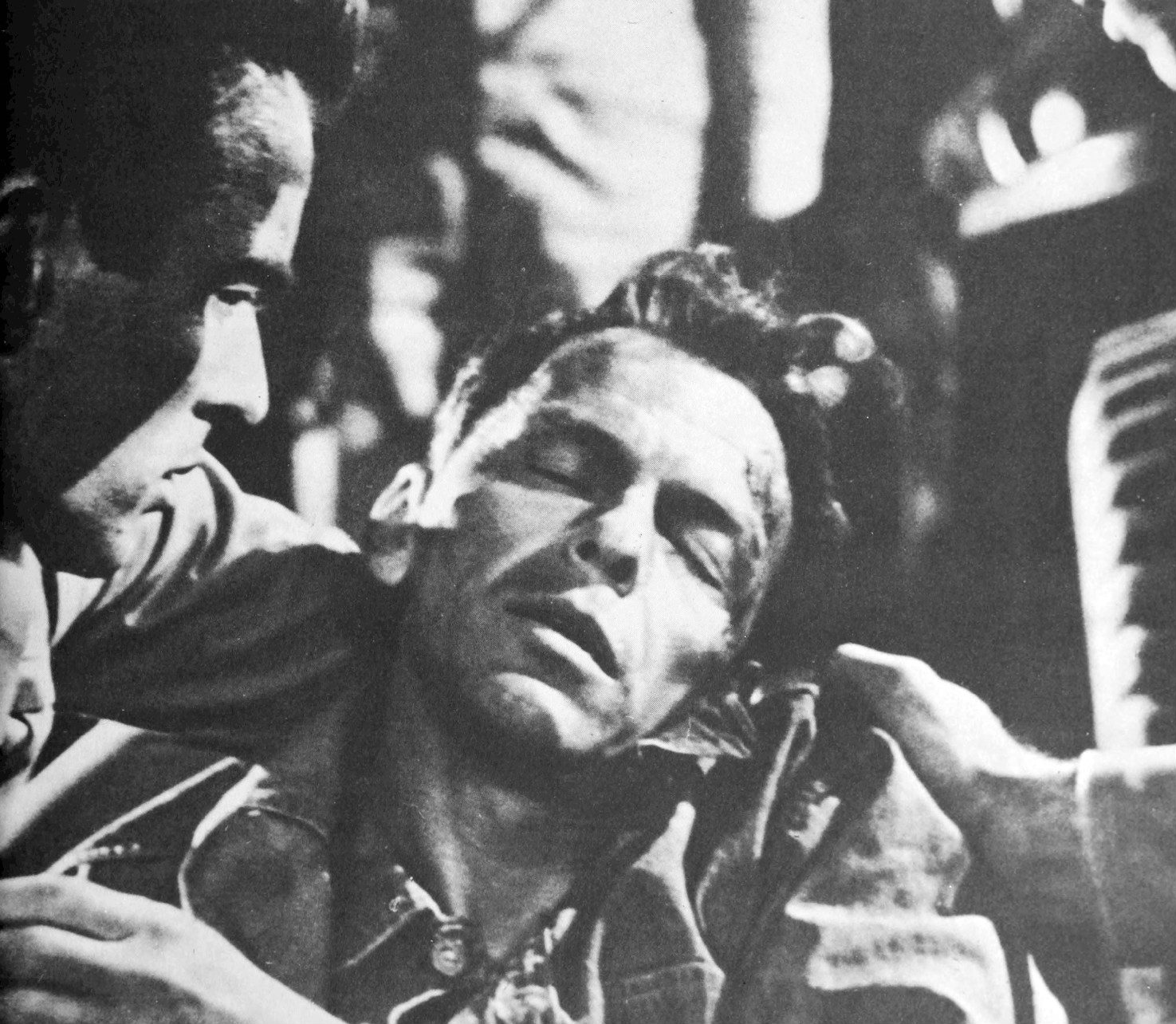
Sinatra as Maggio in From Here to Eternity (1953)

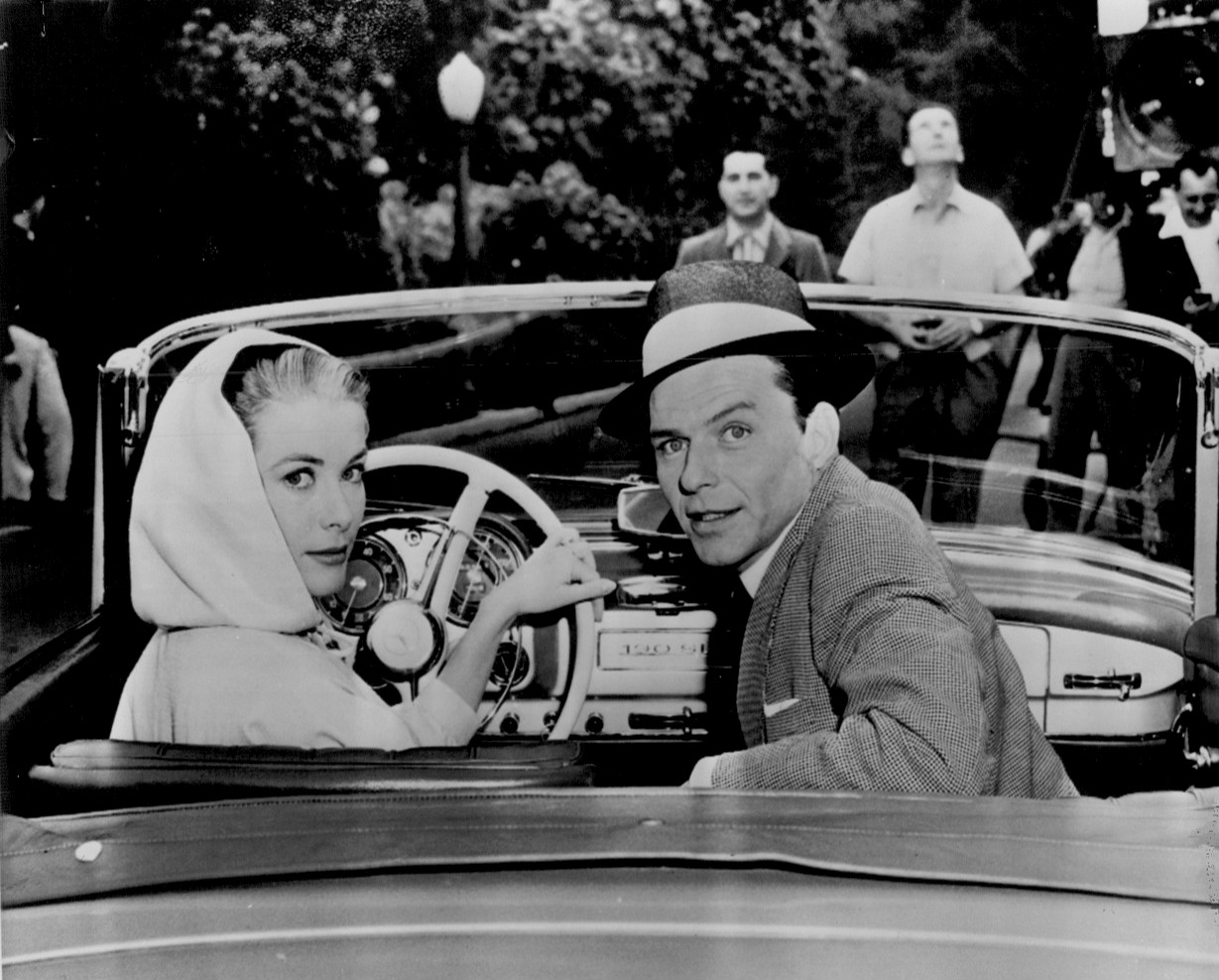
Sinatra and Grace Kelly on the set of High Society (1956)

Sinatra in 1957
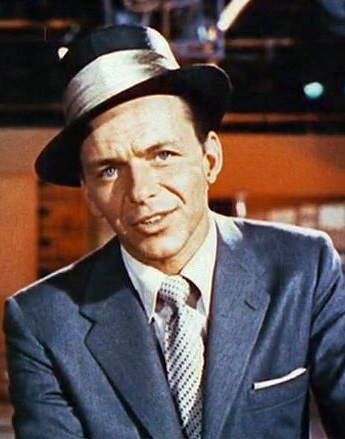
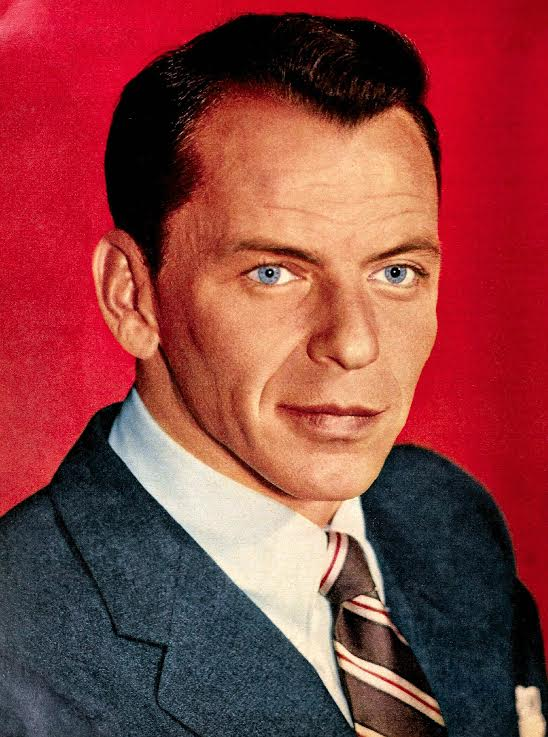

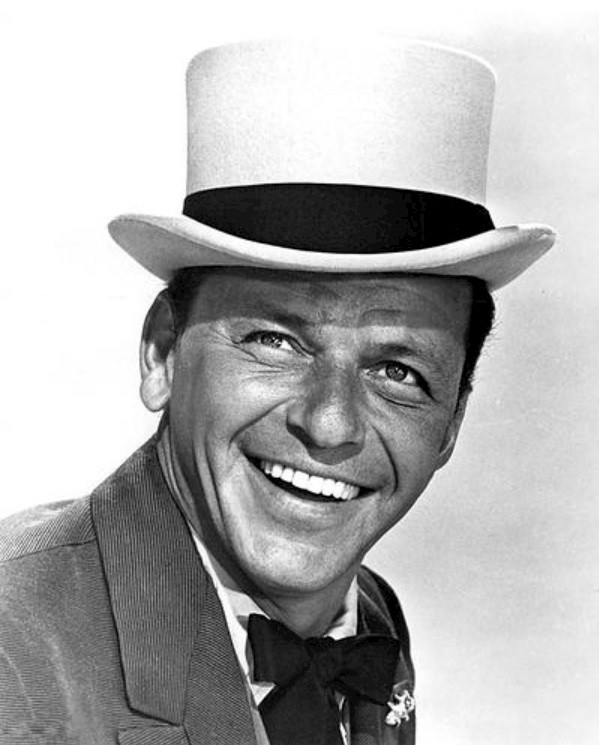
Sinatra in 4 for Texas (1963)

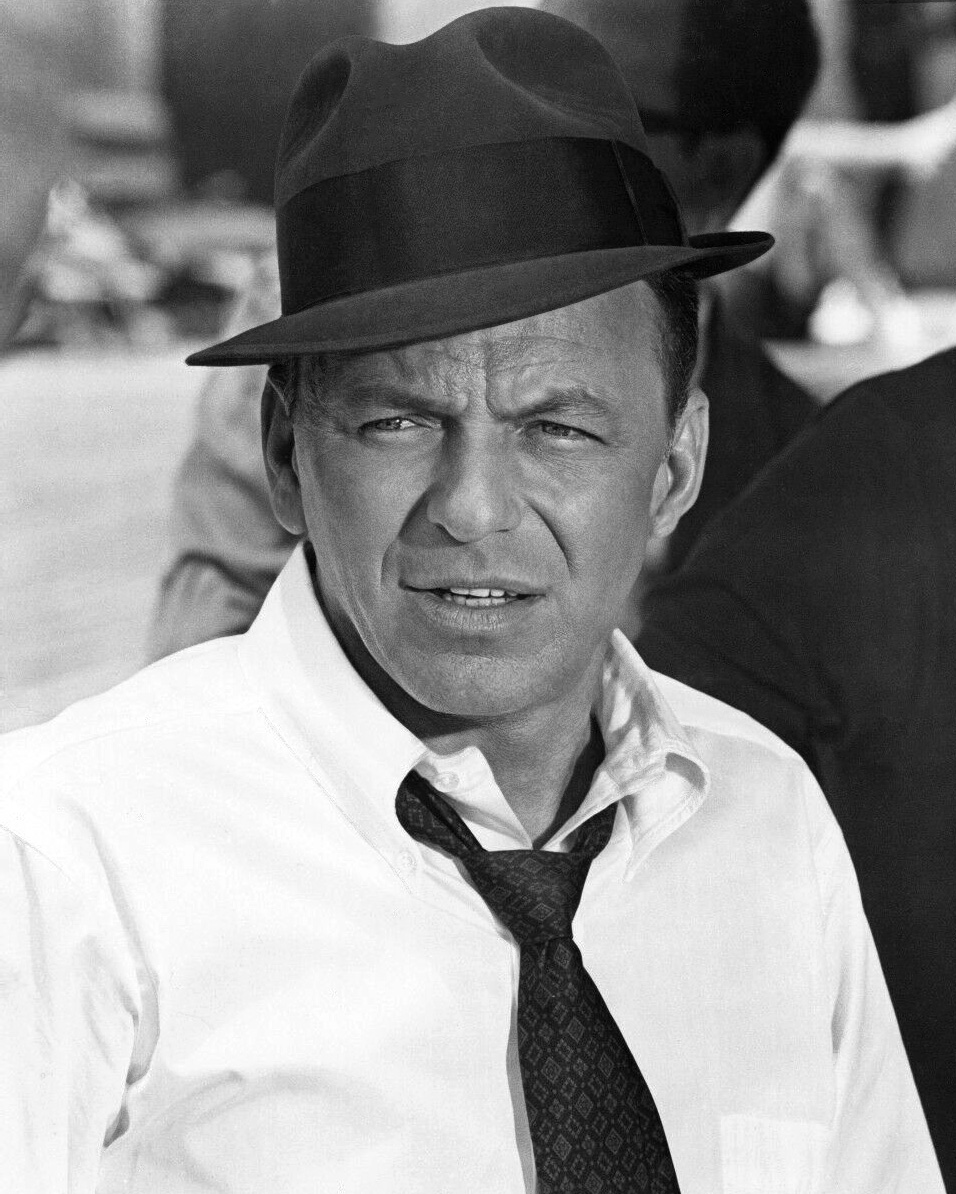
Sinatra as the title character in Tony Rome (1967)

Title	Year	Role	Notes	Ref.
Las Vegas Nights	1941	Singer - Tommy Dorsey's Band	Uncredited	
Ship Ahoy	1942	Singer - Tommy Dorsey's Band	Uncredited	
Reveille with Beverly	1943	Himself		
Higher and Higher	1943	Himself		
Step Lively	1944	Glenn Russell		
Anchors Aweigh	1945	Clarence Doolittle		
Till the Clouds Roll By	1946	Himself	Cameo	
It Happened in Brooklyn	1947	Danny Webson Miller		
The Miracle of the Bells	1948	Father Paul		
The Kissing Bandit	1949	Ricardo		
Take Me Out to the Ball Game	1949	Dennis Ryan		
On the Town	1949	Chip		
Double Dynamite	1951	Johnny Dalton		
Meet Danny Wilson	1952	Danny Wilson		
From Here to Eternity	1953	Angelo Maggio	Academy Award for Best Supporting Actor	
Suddenly	1954	John Baron		
Young at Heart	1954	Barney Sloan		
Not as a Stranger	1955	Alfred Boone		
Guys and Dolls	1955	Nathan Detroit		
The Tender Trap	1955	Charlie Y. Reader		
The Man with the Golden Arm	1955	Frankie Machine		
Meet Me in Las Vegas	1956	Man at Slot Machine	Uncredited	
High Society	1956	Mike Connor		
Johnny Concho	1956	Johnny Concho		
Around the World in 80 Days	1956	Saloon Pianist	Cameo	
The Pride and the Passion	1957	Miguel		
The Joker Is Wild	1957	Joe E. Lewis		
Pal Joey	1957	Joey Evans		
Kings Go Forth	1958	1st Lt. Sam Loggins		
Some Came Running	1958	Dave Hirsh		
A Hole in the Head	1959	Tony Manetta		
Never So Few	1959	Capt. Tom Reynolds		
Can-Can	1960	François Durnais		
Ocean's 11	1960	Danny Ocean		
Pepe	1960	Himself	Cameo	
The Devil at 4 O'Clock	1961	Harry		
Sergeants 3	1962	First-Sergeant Mike Merry		
The Road to Hong Kong	1962	Astronaut	Uncredited, Cameo	
The Manchurian Candidate	1962	Major Bennett Marco		
The List of Adrian Messenger	1963	Gypsy	Cameo	
Come Blow Your Horn	1963	Alan Baker		
4 for Texas	1963	Zack Thomas		
Paris When It Sizzles	1964	Singer	Voice, Uncredited	
Robin and the 7 Hoods	1964	Robbo		
None but the Brave	1965	Chief Pharmacist Mate		
Von Ryan's Express	1965	Colonel Joseph L. Ryan		
Marriage on the Rocks	1965	Dan Edwards		
Cast a Giant Shadow	1966	Vince Talmadge	Cameo	
Assault on a Queen	1966	Mark Brittain		
The Oscar	1966	Himself	Cameo	
The Naked Runner	1967	Sam Laker		
Tony Rome	1967	Tony Rome		
The Detective	1968	Det. Sgt. Joe Leland		
Lady in Cement	1968	Tony Rome		
Dirty Dingus Magee	1970	Dingus Billy Magee		
That's Entertainment!	1974	Himself	Co-Host	
That's Entertainment, Part II	1976	–	Archive Footage	
Contract on Cherry Street	1977	Det. Insp. Frank Hovannes	Television movie	
The First Deadly Sin	1980	Det. Sgt. Edward Delaney		
Cannonball Run II	1983	Himself	Cameo	
Who Framed Roger Rabbit	1988	Singing Sword	Cameo; voice only	
Young at Heart	1995	Fictional version of Himself	Television movie	

== As producer ==
Year	Title	Notes	Ref.
1956	Johnny Concho		
1959	A Hole in the Head	Executive producer	
1962	Sergeants 3		
1964	Robin and the 7 Hoods		
1965	None but the Brave		
1966	Assault on a Queen	Executive producer	
1980	The First Deadly Sin	Executive producer	

== As director ==
Year	Title	Notes	Ref.
1965	None but the Brave	Also produced and starred	

== Shorts ==
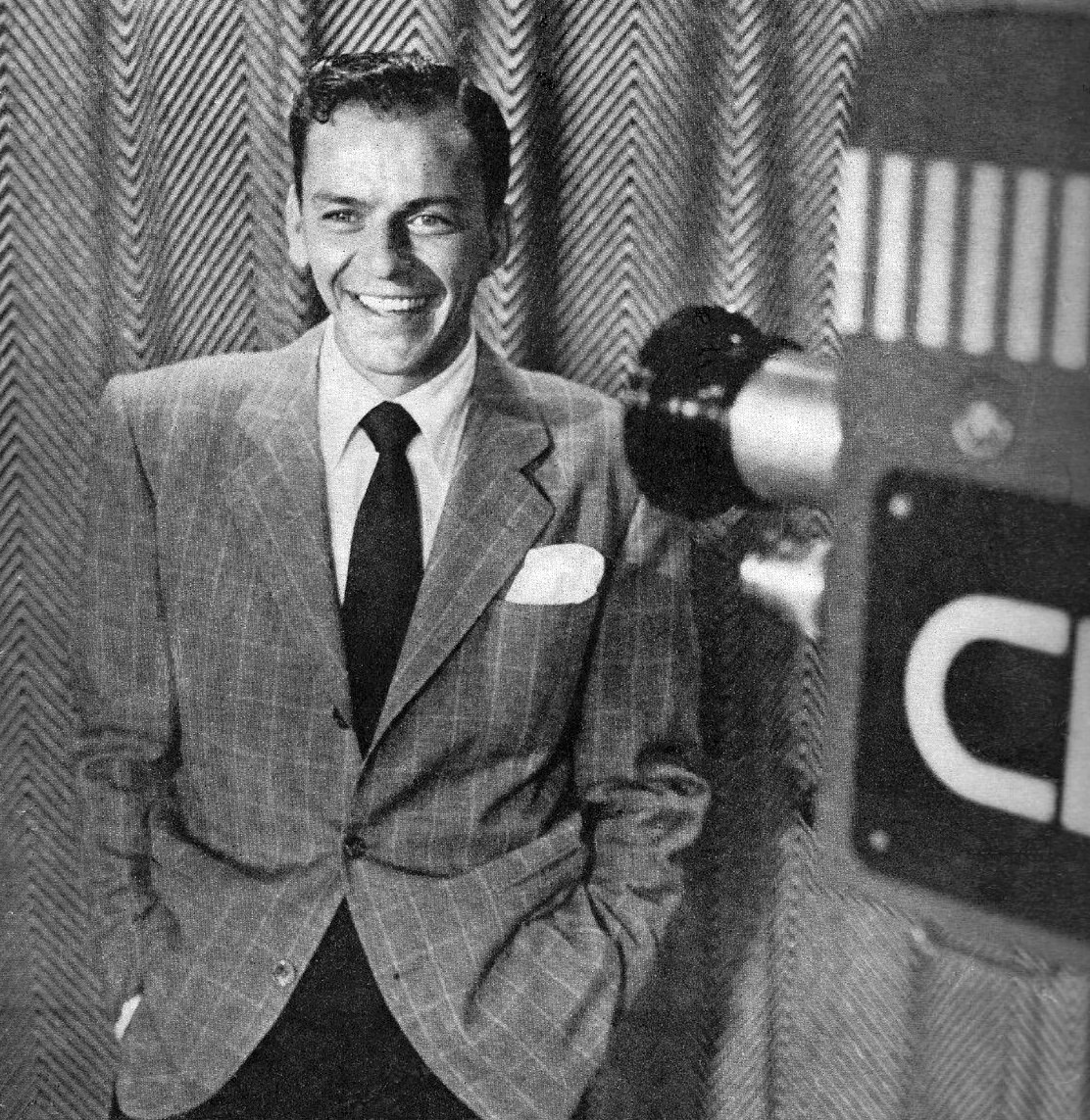
Sinatra in November 1950

Title	Year	Role	Notes	Ref.
Major Bowes' Amateur Theatre of the Air	1935	Himself	Performed in blackface	
The Shining Future	1944	Himself	Running time, 20 minutes	
Road to Victory	1944	Himself	Edited version of The Shining Future. Running time, 10 minutes.	
Show Business at War	1944	–	Running time, 17 minutes	
The House I Live In	1945	Himself	Running time, 10 minutes	
The All-Star Bond Rally	1945	Himself	Running time, 19 minutes	
Lucky Strike Salesman's Movie 48-A	1948	Himself	Running time, 10 minutes	
Hollywood Night Life	1952	–	Running time, 9 minutes	
Invitation to Monte Carlo	1959	Himself	Running time, 46 minutes	
Sinatra in Israel	1962	Narrator	Running time, 22.5 minutes	
Will Rogers Hospital Trailer	1965	Narrator / Himself	Running time, 2.5 minutes	

== See also ==
- List of awards and nominations received by Frank Sinatra

== Notes and references ==
=== Sources ===
- Green, Paul (2014). Jeffrey Hunter: The Film, Television, Radio and Stage Performances. Jefferson, NC: McFarland & Company. ISBN 978-0-7864-7868-2.
- Irwin, Lew (1997). Sinatra: A Life Remembered. Philadelphia, PA: Courage Books. ISBN 0-7624-0397-7.
- Knight, Timothy (2010). Sinatra: Hollywood His Way. Philadelphia, PA: Running Press Book Publishers. ISBN 978-0-7624-4174-7.
- O'Brien, Daniel (1998). The Frank Sinatra Film Guide. London: Batsford Books. ISBN 978-0-7134-8418-2.
- Quinlan, David (2000). Quinlan's Film Stars. London: Batsford. ISBN 978-0-7134-8651-3.
- Raymond, Emilie (2015). Stars for Freedom: Hollywood, Black Celebrities, and the Civil Rights Movement. Washington, DC: University of Washington Press. ISBN 978-0-295-80607-5.
- Ringgold, Gene; McCarty, Clifford (1973). The Films of Frank Sinatra. New York, NY: Citadel Press. ISBN 978-0-8065-0384-4.
