= Sylvia Syms (singer) =

American jazz singer (1917–1992)

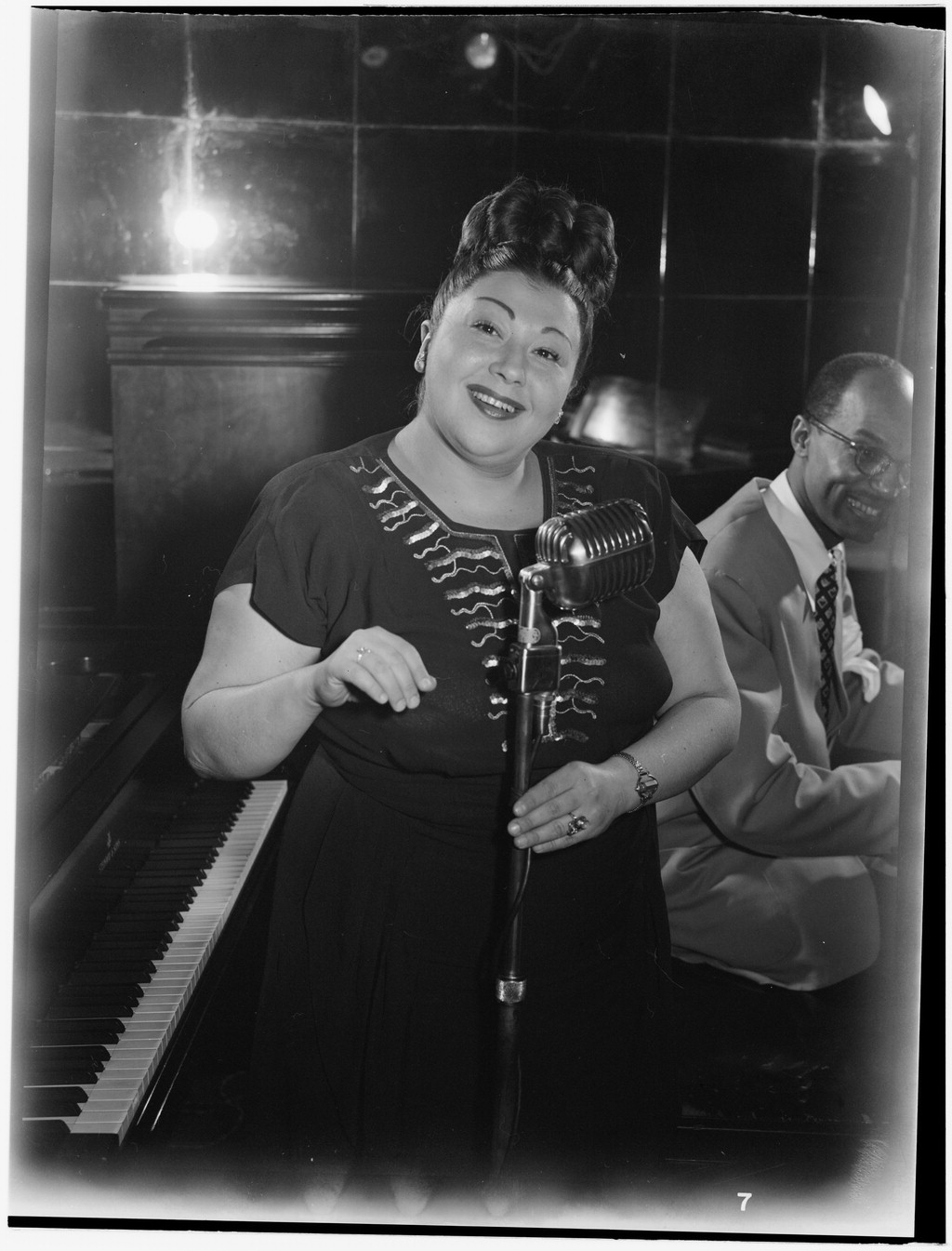
- Sylvia Syms, c. 1946

Background information
- Born: Sylvia Blagman; December 2, 1917; Brooklyn, New York, U.S.
- Died: May 10, 1992 (aged 74) Manhattan, New York City
- Genres: Jazz
- Occupation: Singer

Sylvia Syms (December 2, 1917 – May 10, 1992) was an American jazz singer. One music journalist noted that she was "One of America's most distinguished cabaret and jazz singers with a profound appreciation of lyrics".

== Biography ==
Syms was born Sylvia Blagman in Brooklyn, New York. As a child, she had polio. As a teenager, she went to jazz nightclubs on New York's 52nd Street and received informal training from Billie Holiday. She made her debut in 1941 at Kelly's Stable.

In 1948, performing at the Cinderella Club in Greenwich Village, she was seen by Mae West, who gave her a part in a show she was doing. Among others who observed her in nightclubs was Frank Sinatra who considered her the "world's greatest saloon singer." Sinatra conducted her 1982 album, Syms by Sinatra.

She was signed to a contract by Decca Records, having her major success with a recording of "I Could Have Danced All Night" in 1956, which sold over one million copies and was awarded a gold disc. Syms made regular appearances at the Carlyle in Manhattan. At times, impromptu, while enjoying a cocktail in the bar of the Carlyle, she would walk on stage and perform with the cabaret's other regular, Bobby Short.

Syms had a lung removed around 1972. The operation did not stop her from performing as Bloody Mary in the Rodgers and Hammerstein musical South Pacific at the Chateau de Ville Dinner Theater.

She died of a heart attack while on stage in the Oak Room at the Algonquin Hotel in New York City on May 10, 1992. She was 74 years old.

== Discography ==
Year	Title	Label
1952	Songs By [10" version]	Atlantic
1954	After Dark [10"]	Version Records
1954	Sylvia Sings [EP]	Atlantic
1955	Songs By [12" version]	Atlantic
1956	Sylvia Syms Sings	Decca
1957	Songs of Love	Decca
1959	Torch Song	Columbia
1961	That Man	Kapp
1964	Fabulous	20th Century Fox
1965	Sylvia Is!	Prestige
1967	For Once in My Life	Prestige
1968	In A Sentimental Mood (reissue of 1964 'Fabulous' LP)	Movietone
1970	Love Lady	Stanyan
1976	Lovingly	Atlantic
1978	She Loves to Hear the Music	A&M
1982	Syms by Sinatra	Reprise
1984	A Jazz Portrait of Johnny Mercer	DRG
1989	Then Along Came Bill	DRG
1992	You Must Believe in Spring	Elba
2004	The Columbia Years	Columbia

== Films ==
- The Goldbergs (1950)
- The Blue Veil (1951)
- Night Without Sleep (1952)
- It Happens Every Thursday (1953)
- Some of My Best Friends Are... (1971)
- Born to Win (1971)

== Television ==
- Eddie Condon's Floor Show – 1949
- The Tonight Show – 1954
- The Tonight Show – 1955
- The Tonight Show – 1956
- The VIP Show of the Year – Sep 9, 1956
- The Tonight Show – October 1956
- Stars of Jazz – Dec 17, 1956
- Art Ford's All-Star Jazz Party – 1958
- Playboy's Penthouse – Sep 23, 1961
- Playboy's Penthouse – Apr 21, 1962
- The Merv Griffin Show – 1962
- The Merv Griffin Show – 1963
- The Tonight Show – Sep 17, 1963
- The Mike Douglas Show – 1965
- The Merv Griffin Show – Jun 29, 1966
- Donald O'Connor Show – Oct 21, 1968
- The Merv Griffin Show – 1969
- The Mike Douglas Show – 1969
- The Mike Douglas Show – Aug 9, 1970
- The Tonight Show – Aug 6, 1972
- The Mike Douglas Show – Aug 11, 1974
- The Merv Griffin Show – 1974
- The Tonight Show – Feb 25, 1975
- The Merv Griffin Show – 1978
- The Dick Cavett Show – Nov 16, 1978
- Dinah! – Nov 17, 1978
- Over Easy – Nov 24, 1978
- Over Easy – May 23, 1980
- Glenn Miller: A Moonlight Serenade – Dec 1, 1984
- American Masters: The Long Night of Lady Day – Aug 3, 1986
- Buddy Barnes Live at Studio B – 1986
