= Reprise Records =

American record label

- Parent company: Warner Music Group
- Founded: 1960 (original); 1987 (relaunch)
- Founder: Frank Sinatra
- Defunct: 1976 (original) (Note: Despite the label dissolving in 1976, Neil Young remained signed to it until the release of his 1982 album Trans, which saw him signed to Geffen Records until he rejoined the reactivated label in time to release his 1988 album This Note's for You following a rocky tenure with Geffen that saw lawsuits. Young remains signed with Reprise to this day, a tenure bested only by founder Frank Sinatra, who, from 1976 to 1982 shared the label with Young and then was its sole artist until 1987.)
- Distributors: Warner Records (United States); Warner Music Group (international); Rhino Entertainment Company (re-issues)
- Genre: Various
- Country of origin: United States
- Official website: repriserecords.com

Reprise Records is an American record label founded in 1960 by Frank Sinatra. It is owned by Warner Music Group, and operates through Warner Records, one of its flagship labels.

Artists currently signed to Reprise Records include Green Day, Enya, Michael Bublé, Eric Clapton, Stevie Nicks, Neil Young, Deftones, Lindsey Buckingham, Josh Groban, Disturbed, Idina Menzel, My Chemical Romance, Gerard Way, Dwight Yoakam, Never Shout Never, and Billy Strings.

== Company history ==
=== Beginnings ===
"Tricolor" label, used by Reprise until 1968. (Label to the Kinks' Something Else.)

Reprise Records was formed in 1960 by Frank Sinatra in order to allow more artistic freedom for his own recordings, because of dissatisfaction with Capitol Records, and after trying to buy Norman Granz's Verve Records. The first album Sinatra released on Reprise was Ring-a -Ding-Ding! Soon thereafter, he garnered the nickname "The Chairman of the Board". As CEO of Reprise, Sinatra recruited several artists for the fledgling label, such as fellow Rat Pack members Dean Martin and Sammy Davis Jr. The original roster from 1961 to 1963 included Bing Crosby, Jo Stafford, Rosemary Clooney, Duke Ellington, Nancy Sinatra, Esquivel, and stand-up comedian Redd Foxx. The original Reprise LP label had four different logos, depending on the genre: a riverboat for Pop records (pictured), a cherub for Jazz records, an owl for Spoken Word/Comedy records, and a picture of Sinatra for his records.

Square Reprise Records logo used from 1968 to 2002

"Two-tone orange" label used by Reprise during the Warner Bros.-Seven Arts merger from 1968 to 1969. (Label to Jimi Hendrix's Smash Hits.) After the Kinney National Company took over Warner Bros. in 1969, the orange tone at the top of the label was changed to the same tone as on the rest of the label, the W7 box logo was removed and the circled :r logo (an artistic representation of a repeat symbol in music notation) became a boxed logo without the "Reprise" designation.

One of the label's founding principles under Sinatra's leadership was that each artist would have full creative freedom, and at some point complete ownership of their work, including publishing rights. This is the reason why recordings of early Reprise artists (Dean Martin, Jimi Hendrix, the Kinks, etc.) are (in most cases) currently distributed through other labels. In Martin's case, his Reprise recordings were out of print for nearly 20 years before a deal was struck with Capitol Records. Reprise continued to reissue the Sinatra catalog until 2013 when it was sold to Capitol.

=== Sale to Warner Bros. ===
In August 1963, as part of a film deal, Warner Bros. purchased Reprise (which had been losing money) from Frank Sinatra, who nonetheless retained a 1/3 interest in the label until the end of the year. Many of the older artists on the label were dropped by Warner Bros. Records. Reprise president Mo Ostin was retained as the head of the label and he went on to play a very significant role in the history of the Warner group of labels over the next four decades. Warner-Reprise executives began targeting younger acts, beginning by securing the American distribution rights to the Pye Records recordings by the Kinks in 1964. Reprise soon added teen-oriented pop acts like Dino, Desi & Billy to the roster. As well, Sinatra's own daughter Nancy (who began recording for the label in 1961) was retained by Ostin, becoming a major pop star from late 1965. The label moved almost exclusively to rock-oriented music in the late 1960s, although Frank Sinatra continued to record for the label until the 1980s.

Through direct signings or distribution deals, by the 1970s the Reprise roster grew to include Lee Hazlewood, Jill Jackson, Jimi Hendrix, the early Joni Mitchell recordings, Neil Young, the Electric Prunes, Donna Loren, Arlo Guthrie, Norman Greenbaum, Tom Lehrer, Kenny Rogers and The First Edition, Tiny Tim, Ry Cooder, Captain Beefheart, John Sebastian, Family, the early 1970s recordings by Frank Zappa and the Mothers, Gram Parsons, Emmylou Harris, Nico's Desertshore, the Fugs, Jethro Tull, Pentangle, T. Rex, the Meters, John Cale, Gordon Lightfoot, Michael Franks, Richard Pryor, Al Jarreau, Fleetwood Mac, Fanny, and the Beach Boys.

=== Dormancy ===
Red label, used by Reprise throughout the 1980s. (Label to Neil Young's Decade.)

In 1976, the Reprise label was deactivated by Warner Bros. and all of its roster (except Frank Sinatra and Neil Young) were moved to the main Warner Bros. label. Although older catalog albums continued to be manufactured with the Reprise logo, and albums by the Beach Boys on Brother Records were issued in the Reprise catalog numbering sequence, aside from Sinatra and Young (and the Sylvia Syms album Syms by Sinatra, which Sinatra conducted and co-produced) there were no new releases on Reprise for several years.

=== Revival and Reprise today (1985–present) ===
In late 1985, some copies of the Dream Academy's hit single "Life in a Northern Town" were pressed on the Warner Bros. label bearing the Reprise logo. 1986 saw releases bearing Reprise labels from the Dream Academy as well as Dwight Yoakam. In summer 1987, Warner Bros. Records chairman Mo Ostin and label president Lenny Waronker officially announced the reactivation of Reprise, including its own separate promotions department, and former Warner Bros. Vice President of Promotion Rich Fitzgerald was appointed as label vice president. In the time since, Warner Bros. has often elevated the stature of Reprise to the rank of secondary parent label, as many of its subsidiary labels (such as Straight and Kinetic) have had their records released in conjunction with Reprise.

As of 2017, it is home to such artists as Enya, Michael Bublé, Eric Clapton, Green Day, Stevie Nicks, Neil Young, Deftones, Josh Groban, Disturbed, Idina Menzel, Tom Petty and the Heartbreakers, Gerard Way and Never Shout Never.

It was formerly home to Jimi Hendrix and the Barenaked Ladies' catalogs in the U.S. When the Bee Gees back catalog was remastered by Rhino Records in the 2000s, their CDs were issued under the Reprise label (they appeared on sister labels Atco and Warner Bros. in the past).

Neil Young stated in a documentary about his life that Charles Manson was turned down by Reprise.

In 2010, Reprise opened a country music division, operating as part of Warner Music Group Nashville, featuring Blake Shelton, the JaneDear Girls, Michelle Branch and Frankie Ballard as part of its roster.

In September 2011, several layoffs took place at Reprise Records and other Warner labels.

In 2017, Reprise released Enya's albums on vinyl. Some of them were pressed on this format for the first time.

== Publications ==
- Hard Rope & Silken Twine (1974), written by The Incredible String Band, illustrated by Wayne Anderson

== Labels ==
- 143 Records (1999–2001)
- Bizarre Records (1968–1972)
- Big Brother Records (2008–present)
- BME Recordings (2004–present)
- Brother Records (1970–1977)
- Chrysalis Records (1969–1972)
- Cold Chillin' Records (1988–1993; select releases)
- DiscReet Records (1973–1979)
- Elementree Records (1995–2000)
- Giant Records (1990–2001; select releases)
- Grand Jury Records (1990–1993)
- In Bloom Records (1998–2000)
- Kinetic Records (1992–2000)
- Straight Records (1968–1972)
- Sire Records (1977–2000: select releases)
- Vapor Records (1995–present; currently active)

== Parent organizations ==
- (1960–1968) Independent
- (1968–1969) Warner Bros.-Seven Arts
- (1969–1972) Kinney National Company
- (1972–1990) Warner Communications
- (1990–2001) Time Warner
- (2001–2003) AOL Time Warner
- (2004–present) Warner Music Group

== See also ==
- List of record labels
- Warner Records
