= List of songs recorded by Doris Day =

Songs recorded by Doris Day
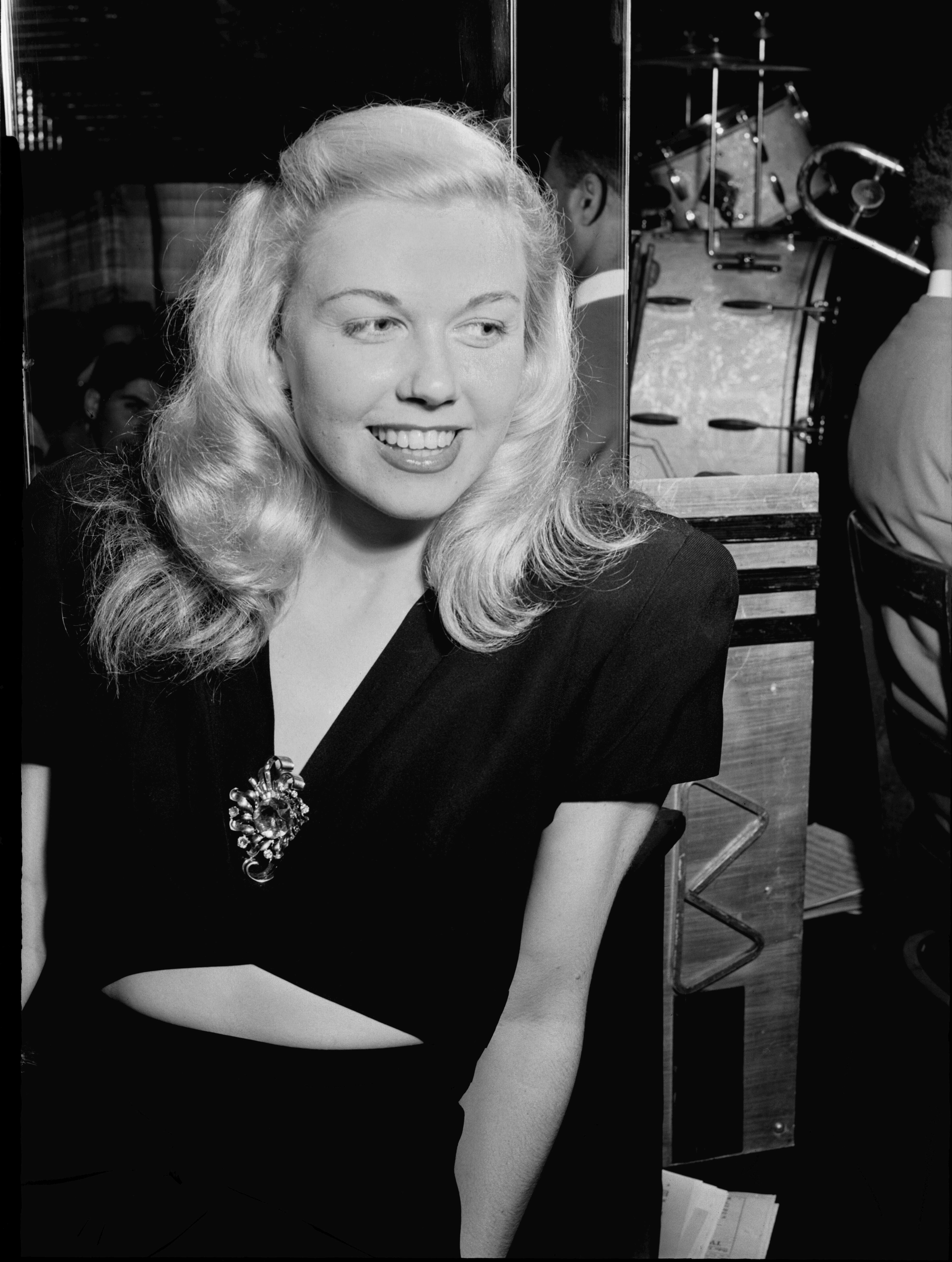
- Day at the Aquarium Jazz Club, New York (1946)
- Released songs: 439

This is a partial list of Doris Day's recorded songs. Note that if no album name is given, the song was only issued as a single; if an album name is given, the song was only released as an album, unless it is stated that the song was released both as a single and on an album. All recordings were released by Columbia Records in the United States, except for those tracks included on The Love Album, and two songs which never were released in the US until incorporated in a compact disc album called "The 1960s Singles" in 2002: "Let the Little Girl Limbo" and "Oo-Wee Baby." Doris Day's hits in the UK between 1955 and 1958 were released on Philips Records.

Song	Music by	Lyrics by	Recording date	Notes
A
"Abide with Me"	William H. Monk	Henry F. Lyte	July 11, 1962	from the album You'll Never Walk Alone
"Again"	Lionel Newman	Dorcas Cochran	March 23, 1949 #1 Charted Hit in 1949	(with John Rarig's orch. and The Mellomen) several other versions charted; Doris Day's was highest-charting version at #2 on Billboard chart
"Ain't We Got Fun?"	Richard A. Whiting	Raymond B. Egan; Gus Kahn	November 13, 1951 TOP 10 ALBUM IN 51	(duet with Danny Thomas, Paul Weston's orchestra) released both as single and on the album I'll See You in My Dreams
"Ain't We Got Fun?"	Richard A. Whiting	Raymond B. Egan; Gus Kahn	February 20, 1953	with the Norman Luboff Choir from the album By the Light of the Silvery Moon
"All Alone"	Irving Berlin		June 6, 1967	from the album The Love Album
"All I Do is Dream of You"	Nacio Herb Brown	Arthur Freed	May 2, 1961	from the album I Have Dreamed
"All through the Day"	Jerome Kern	Oscar Hammerstein II	March 6, 1946 TOP 10 HIT IN 1946	(with Les Brown's Band of Renown)
"Another Go Around"	Noël Regney; Gloria Shayne		May 13, 1965	(with Mort Garson's orchestra)
"Anything You Can Do"	Irving Berlin		October 8, 1962	(duet with Robert Goulet) from the album Annie Get Your Gun
"Any Way the Wind Blows"	Joseph Hooven; Marilyn Hooven	William Dunham	January 12, 1959 TOP 40 HIT	(with Frank DeVol's orchestra)
"Are You Lonesome Tonight?"	Lou Handman	Roy Turk	June 6, 1967	from the album The Love Album
"Aren't You Glad You're You?	Jimmy Van Heusen	Johnny Burke	September 15, 1945 TOP 10 CHARTED HIT	(with Les Brown's Band of Renown]
"As Long As He Needs Me"	Lionel Bart		October 29, 1963	from the album Love Him
"At Last"	Harry Warren	Mack Gordon	September 15, 1964	from the album Doris Day's Sentimental Journey
"At the Café Rendezvous"	Jule Styne	Sammy Cahn	May 13, 1949	(with John Rarig's orchestra)
"Au Revoir Is Goodbye with a Smile"	Mort Garson	Bob Hilliard	June 18, 1965	(with Mort Garson's orchestra)
"Autumn Leaves"	Joseph Kosma	French: Jacques Prévert; English: Johnny Mercer	September 21, 1956	from the album Day by Day
B
"Baby Doll"	Harry Warren	Johnny Mercer	September 12, 1951	(with Paul Weston's orchestra)
"Be a Child at Christmas Time"	Martin Broones	William A. Luce	June 17, 1964	from The Doris Day Christmas Album
"Before I Loved You"	Joan Whitney; Alex Kramer		March 14, 1950	(with George Wyle orchestra)
"Be Mine Tonight (Noche De Ronda)"	Maria Teresa Lara	Spanish: Maria Teresa Lara; English: Sunny Skylar	November 9, 1964	from the album Latin for Lovers
"Be My Little Baby Bumble Bee"	Henry I. Marshall	Stanley Murphy	January 30, 1953	with the Norman Luboff Choir and Paul Weston's orchestra released both as a single and on the album By The Light Of The Silvery Moon
"Be Still and Know"			July 13, 1962	from the album You'll Never Walk Alone
"The Best Thing for You"	Irving Berlin		September 13, 1950	
"Be True to Me (Sabor A Mi)"	Alarcon Carillo	Spanish: Alarcon Carillo; English: Mel Mitchell	November 5, 1964	from the album Latin for Lovers
"Bewitched, Bothered & Bewildered"	Richard Rodgers	Lorenz Hart	May 13, 1949 #1 HIT	(with John Rarig's orchestra) released both as a single and on the album You're My Thrill, later issued on Day Dreams; 1,000,000+ sales; #1 on Cash Box chart and in Australia
"The Black Hills of Dakota"	Sammy Fain	Paul Francis Webster	July 16, 1953	released both as a single (#7 in the U.K.) and on the album, Calamity Jane
"Blame My Absent-Minded Heart"	Jule Styne	Sammy Cahn	April 15, 1949	(with John Rarig's orchestra)
"Bless This House"	Helen Taylor; May H. Morgan		July 13, 1962	from the album You'll Never Walk Alone
"Bluebird on Your Windowsill"	Elizabeth Clarke; Robert Mellin		September 14, 1949	(with George Siravo orchestra)
"Blues in the Night"	Harold Arlen	Johnny Mercer	November 19, 1957	from the album Hooray for Hollywood (Vol. 1)
"The Blue Train"	Jim Harbert; Paul Manning		January 25, 1950	(with Jim Harbert's orchestra)
"Bright and Shiny"	Bob Sherman; Dick Sherman		December 23. 1960	from the album Bright and Shiny
"A Bushel and a Peck"	Frank Loesser		September 13, 1950 TOP 20 HIT IN 1950	(with David Rose's orchestra)
"But Beautiful"	Jimmy Van Heusen	Johnny Burke	September 26, 1956	from the album Day by Day
"But Not for Me"	George Gershwin	Ira Gershwin	September 26, 1956	from the album Day by Day
"By the Light of the Silvery Moon"	Gus Edwards	Edward Madden	February 13, 1953	with the Norman Luboff Choir from the album of the same name
C
"Canadian Capers"	Gus Chandler; Bert White; Henry Cohen		January 7, 1949 TOP 20 HIT	(with John Rarig's orchestra) (see also "Cuttin' Capers" below)
"Candy Lips"	Fred Rose		December 5, 1952 TOP 20 HIT	(duet with Johnnie Ray, Paul Weston's orchestra)
"Can't Help Falling in Love"	George David Weiss; Hugo Peretti; Luigi Creatore)		October 29, 1963	from the album Love Him
"Caprice"	Larry Marks		November 4, 1966	
"Catch the Bouquet"	Fred Spielman	Hans Haller	May 13, 1965	(with Mort Garson's orchestra)
"Cheek to Cheek"	Irving Berlin		October 16, 1957	from the album Hooray for Hollywood (Vol. 1)
"The Children's Marching Song (Nick Nack Paddy Whack)"	traditional		July 14, 1964	(with Jimmy Joyce and the Children's Chorus) from the album With a Smile and a Song
"A Chocolate Sundae on a Saturday Night"	Hal David; Fred Wise; Al Frisch		November 6, 1947	
"Choo Choo Train (Ch-Ch-Foo)"	Marc Fontenoy	Marc Fontenoy; Jack Lawrence	1953	
"Christmas Present"	Sydney Robin		June 18, 1964	from The Doris Day Christmas Album
"The Christmas Song (Chestnuts Roasting on an Open Fire)"	Mel Tormé	Bob Wells	August 29, 1946	(with Les Brown's Band of Renown)
"The Christmas Song (Chestnuts Roasting on an Open Fire)"	Mel Tormé	Bob Wells	June 16, 1964	from The Doris Day Christmas Album
"Christmas Story"	Walsh		September 11, 1950	released both as single and on the album On Moonlight Bay
"The Christmas Waltz"	Jule Styne	Sammy Cahn	June 18, 1964	from The Doris Day Christmas Album
"The Circus is on Parade"	Richard Rodgers	Lorenz Hart	1962	(with Jimmy Durante and Martha Raye) from Billy Rose's Jumbo
"Clap Yo' Hands"	George Gershwin	Ira Gershwin	December 19, 1960	from the album Bright and Shiny
"Close Your Eyes"	Bernice Petkere		August 27, 1957	from the album Day by Night
"Close Your Eyes"	Bernice Petkere		December 16, 1961	(with the André Previn Trio) from the album Duet
"The Comb and Paper Polka"	Hugo Hollander; Michael Feahy		August 31, 1950	(with Frank Yankovic & his Yanks)
"Come to Baby, Do!"	Inez James; Sidney Miller		September 6, 1945 Hit the charts at #13	(with Les Brown's Band of Renown)
"Come to Baby, Do!"	Inez James; Sidney Miller		September 21, 1964	from the album Doris Day's Sentimental Journey
"Confess"	Bennie Benjamin; George David Weiss		November 21, 1947 TOP 10 HIT B/W LOVE SOMEBODY	(duet with Buddy Clark, George Siravo orchestra) (also done by Patti Page)
"Control Yourself"	André Previn	Dory Langdon Previn	November 30, 1961	(with the André Previn Orchestra) from the album Duet
"Crazy Rhythm"	Joseph Meyer; Roger Wolfe Kahn; Irving Caesar		July 25, 1950	(duet with Gene Nelson & The Page Cavanaugh Trio) released both as single and on the album Tea for Two
"Cuddle up a Little Closer"	Karl Hoschna	Otto Harbach	March 30, 1951	(with Paul Weston's orchestra) released both as single and on the album On Moonlight Bay
"Cuttin' Capers"	Gus Chandler; Bert White; Henry Cohen	Earl Burnett; Ralph Blane; Harry Warren	November 29, 1958	from the album Cuttin' Capers
D
"Daffa Down Dilly"	Jim Harbert; Charlene Harbert		January 25, 1960	(with Jim Harbert's orchestra)
"Dansero"	Richard Hayman; Lee Daniels; Sol Parker		November 9, 1964	from the album Latin for Lovers
"Darn That Dream"	Jimmy Van Heusen	Eddie De Lange	May 26, 1950	from the album Day Dreams
"Day by Day"	Axel Stordahl; Paul Weston	Sammy Cahn	January 16, 1946	(with Les Brown's Band of Renown)#15 on charts
"Day by Day"	Axel Stordahl; Paul Weston	Sammy Cahn	September 21, 1956	from the album of the same name
"Daydreaming"	André Previn	Dory Langdon Previn	December 16, 1961	(with André Previn's orchestra) from the album Duet
"The Deadwood Stage (Whip-Crack-Away)"			August 27, 1953	released both as a single and on the album, Calamity Jane
"Deck the Halls with Boughs of Holly"			June 10, 1959	(with Frank De Vol's orchestra) unreleased until its inclusion on the Bear Family box set Que Sera, Sera in 1996
"The Deevil, Devil, Divil"	Carl Sigman	Bob Russell; Lee Kaydan	March 27, 1946	(with Les Brown's Band of Renown)
"Do Do Do"	George Gershwin	Ira Gershwin	July 14, 1950	(with Axel Stordahl's orchestra) released both as a single and on the album Tea for Two
"Doin' What Comes Naturally"	Irving Berlin		October 8, 1962	from the album Annie Get Your Gun
"Domino"	Louis Ferrari	French: Jacques Plante; English: Don Raye	October 4, 1951	(with Paul Weston's orchestra)
"Do Not Disturb"	Ben Raleigh	Mark Barkan	June 18, 1965	(with Mort Garson's orchestra)
"Don't Take Your Love From Me"	Henry Nemo		September 17, 1956	from the album Day by Day
"Do Re Mi"	Richard Rodgers	Oscar Hammerstein II)	July 14, 1964	(with Jimmy Joyce and the Children's Chorus) from the album With a Smile and a Song
"Dream a Little Dream of Me"	Officially credited to Fabian Andre and Wilbur Schwandt; claimed by Milton Adolphus in some sources	Gus Kahn	August 23, 1957	from the album Day by Night
E
"Easy to Love"	Cole Porter		November 12, 1957	from the album Hooray for Hollywood (Vol. 1)
"Enjoy Yourself (It's Later Than You Think)"	Carl Sigman	Herb Magidson	January 13, 1950 TOP 20 HIT	(with George Wyle's orchestra)
"The Everlasting Arms"	Martin Broones	Paul Francis Webster	September 11, 1950	(with the Norman Luboff Choir)
"The Everlasting Arms"	Martin Broones	Paul Francis Webster	December 22, 1959	(with Harry Zimmerman's orchestra) from the album What Every Girl Should Know
"Everybody Loves a Lover"	Robert Allen	Richard Adler	May 12, 1958 TOP 10 HIT	(with Frank DeVol's orchestra)
"Everybody Loves My Baby"	Jack Palmer	Spencer Williams	November 18, 1954	from the album Love Me or Leave Me
"Every Little Movement (Has a Meaning All Its Own)"	Karl Hoschna	Otto Harbach	March 30, 1951	(with the Norman Luboff Choir and Paul Weston's orchestra) released both as a single and on the album On Moonlight Bay
"Every Now and Then (You Come Around)"	Eddie Snyder; Richard Ahlert		January 21, 1966	(with Mort Garson's orchestra)
"Everywhere You Go"	Larry Shay; Mark Fisher	Joe Goodwin	March 23, 1949	(with the Mellomen and John Rarig's orchestra)
F
"A Faded Summer Love"	Phil Baxter		June 6, 1967	from the album The Love Album
"Falling"	Bruce Johnston; Don Wyatt		January 25, 1960	(with Jim Harbert's orchestra)
"Falling in Love Again"	Frederick Hollander	Sammy Lerner	December 16, 1961	(with the André Previn Orchestra) from the album Duet
"A Fellow Needs a Girl"	Richard Rodgers	Oscar Hammerstein II	December 11, 1959	(with Harry Zimmerman's orchestra) from the album What Every Girl Should Know
"Fine and Dandy"	Kay Swift	Paul James (James Warburg)	December 8, 1950	(with the Norman Luboff Choir and the Buddy Cole Quartet) released both as a single and on the album Lullaby of Broadway
"Fit as a Fiddle (And Ready for Love)"	Arthur Freed; Al Goodhart (or Goodheart)		November 18, 1958	from the album Cuttin' Capers
"Fly Me to the Moon (In Other Words)"	Bart Howard		November 5, 1964	from the album Latin for Lovers
"A Foggy Day"	George Gershwin	Ira Gershwin	October 29, 1957	from the album Hooray for Hollywood (Vol. 2)
"Fools Rush In (Where Angels Fear to Tread)"	Rube Bloom	Johnny Mercer	December 16, 1961	(with the André Previn Orchestra) from the album Duet
"For All We Know"	J. Fred Coots	Sam M. Lewis	June 9, 1967	from the album The Love Album
"A Full Time Job"	Gerry Teifer		October 16, 1952 TOP 20 HIT in U.S.; #11 in U.K.	(duet with Johnnie Ray, Paul Weston's orchestra)
"Funny"	Hal Shaper; Antonio DeVito; Giorgio Calabrese		November 5, 1963	from the album Love Him
G
"The Game of Broken Hearts"	Don Larkin; Sally Clark; Eddie McMullen		October 19, 1949	(as "Doris Day with her Country Cousins")
"Gently Johnny"	Kay Twomey; Fred Wise; Ben Weisman		February 9, 1952	(duet with Guy Mitchell, Paul Weston's orchestra)
"Get Out and Get Under the Moon"	Larry Shay	Charles Tobias; William Jerome	November 25, 1958	from the album Cuttin' Capers
"Getting to Know You"	Richard Rodgers	Oscar Hammerstein II)	July 7, 1964	(with Jimmy Joyce and the Children's Chorus) from the album With a Smile and a Song
"Give a Little Whistle"	Leigh Harline	Ned Washington	July 10, 1964	(with Jimmy Joyce and the Children's Chorus) from the album With a Smile and a Song
"Give Me Time"	Alec Wilder		December 16, 1961	(with the André Previn Orchestra) from the album Duet
"The Glass Bottom Boat"	Joe Lubin		January 21, 1966	(with Mort Garson's orchestra)
"Gone with the Wind"	Allie Wrubel	Herbert Magidson	September 17, 1956	from the album Day by Day
"Gotta Feelin'"			December 23, 1960	from the album Bright and Shiny
"A Guy Is a Guy"	Oscar Brand		July 2, 1952 #1 on Billboard chart; #2 on Cash Box chart; MILLION SELLER	(with Paul Weston's orchestra)
"The Gypsy in My Soul"	Clay Boland	Moe Jaffe	September 17, 1956	from the album Day by Day
H
"Happy Talk"	Richard Rodgers	Oscar Hammerstein II	December 19, 1960	from the album Bright and Shiny
"Have Yourself A Merry Little Christmas"	Hugh Martin; Ralph Blane		June 16, 1964	from The Doris Day Christmas Album
"He'll Have to Cross the Atlantic"	Jule Styne	Sammy Cahn	May 17, 1945	(with Les Brown's Band of Renown)
"Hello, My Lover, Goodbye"	John W. Green	Edward Heyman	September 21, 1956	from the album Day by Day
"Here in My Arms"	Richard Rodgers	Lorenz Hart	July 14, 1950	(with Axel Stordahl's orchestra) released both as single and on the album Tea for Two
"Here We Go Again"	Joe Seneca		January 25, 1960	(with Jim Harbert's orchestra)
"He's Home For a Little While"	Ted Shapiro	Kermit Goell	February 1, 1945	(with Les Brown's Band of Renown)
"He's So Married"	Jimmie Dodd	Will Fowler	August 15, 1958	with Frank De Vol and his Orchestra
"Hey There"	Jerry Ross	Richard Adler	NEVER RELEASED AS A SINGLE; briefly featured in film, PAJAJA GAME;	
"High Hopes"	Jimmy Van Heusen	Sammy Cahn	July 14, 1964 FEATURED IN THE FILM, "ANTZ"	(with Jimmy Joyce and the Children's Chorus) from the album With a Smile and a Song
"Hold Me in Your Arms"	Ray Heindorf; Don Pippin	Charles Henderson	September 24, 1954	from the album Young at Heart
"Hoop-Dee-Doo"	Milton De Lugg	Frank Loesser	March 14, 1950 #4 on Cash Box chart; #17 on Billboard chart	(with the Mellomen and George Wyle's orchestra)
"Hooray for Hollywood"	Richard A. Whiting	Johnny Mercer	November 19, 1957	from the album Hooray for Hollywood (Vol. 1)
"How Insensitive"	Antônio Carlos Jobim	Portuguese: Vinícius de Moraes; English: Norman Gimbel	November 9, 1964	from the album Latin for Lovers
"A Hundred Years from Today"	Victor Young	Ned Washington; Joe Young	December 17, 1959	(with Harry Zimmerman's orchestra) from the album What Every Girl Should Know
I
"I Believe in Dreams"	Jim Harbert		May 3, 1961	from the album I Have Dreamed
"I Can Do Without You"			August 5, 1953	(duet with Howard Keel) from the album, Calamity Jane
"I Didn't Know What Time It Was"	Richard Rodgers	Lorenz Hart	June 17, 1949	from the album Day Dreams
"I Didn't Slip, I Wasn't Pushed, I Fell"	George Wyle	Edward Pola	March 14, 1950 TOP 20 HIT	(with the Mellomen, George Wyle orchestra)
"I Don't Wanna Be Kissed (By Anyone But You)"	Harold Spina	Jack Elliott	November 30, 1949	(with George Siravo orchestra)
"I Don't Want to Walk Without You"	Jule Styne	Frank Loesser	1965	(medley with "I Had the Craziest Dream") from the album Doris Day's Sentimental Journey
"I Feel Like a Feather in the Breeze"	Harry Revel	Mack Gordon	November 29, 1958	from the album Cuttin' Capers
"If I Can Help Somebody"	A. Bazel Androzzo		July 12, 1962	from the album You'll Never Walk Alone
"If I Could Be with You"	James P. Johnson	Henry Creamer		from the album Day Dreams
"If I Give My Heart to You"	Jimmy Brewster; Jimmie Crane; Al Jacobs		July 27, 1954 #2 on Cash Box chart; #3 on Billboard chart; #4 in U.K.	(with The Mellomen, Frank De Vol's orchestra) (also done by Denise Lor)
"If I Had My Life to Live Over"	Larry Vincent; Henry Tobias; Moe Jaffe		May 25, 1967	from the album The Love Album
"If I Were a Bell"	Frank Loesser		September 28, 1950 TOP 20 HIT	(with George Siravo orchestra)
"If You Were the Only Girl"	Nat D. Ayer	Clifford Grey	January 30, 1953	from the album By the Light of the Silvery Moon
"If You Will Marry Me"	Roz Gordon		December 15, 1948	(with Buddy Clark, Mitchell Ayres' orchestra)
"I Got Lost in His Arms"	Irving Berlin		October 8, 1962	from the album Annie Get Your Gun
"I Got the Sun in the Morning"	Irving Berlin		March 27, 1946 TOP 10 HIT	(with Les Brown's Band of Renown)Charted at #2
"I Got the Sun in the Morning"	Irving Berlin		1960	from the album Show Time
"I Got the Sun in the Morning"	Irving Berlin		October 8, 1962	from the album Annie Get Your Gun
"I Hadn't Anyone Till You"	Ray Noble		September 26, 1956	from the album Day by Day
"I Had the Craziest Dream"	Harry Warren	Mack Gordon	November 5, 1957	from the album Hooray for Hollywood (Vol. 1)
"I Had the Craziest Dream"	Harry Warren	Mack Gordon	September 21, 1964	(medley with "I Don't Want to Walk Without You") from the album Doris Day's Sentimental Journey
"I Have Dreamed"	Richard Rodgers	Oscar Hammerstein II	May 5, 1961	from the album of the same name
"I Know That You Know"	Vincent Youmans	Anne Caldwell	July 25, 1950	(duet with Gene Nelson & The Page Cavanaugh Trio) released both as a single and on the album Tea for Two
"I'll Always Be with You"	Marjorie Goetschius; Edna Osser		February 7, 1945	(with Les Brown's Band of Renown)
"I'll Be Around"	Alec Wilder		May 26, 1950 TOP 20 HIT	(with Axel Stordahl's orchestra)
"I'll Be Home for Christmas"	Walter Kent		June 18, 1964	from The Doris Day Christmas Album
"I'll Buy That Dream"	Allie Wrubel	Herb Magidson	May 2, 1961	from the album I Have Dreamed
"I'll Forget You"	Ernest R. Ball; Annelu Burns		January 30, 1953	from the album By the Light of the Silvery Moon
"I'll Never Slip Around Again"	Floyd Tillman		October 19, 1949	(as "Doris Day with her Country Cousins")
"I'll Never Smile Again"	Ruth Lowe		September 15, 1964	from the album Doris Day's Sentimental Journey
"I'll Never Stop Loving You"	Nicholas Brodzsky	Sammy Cahn	December 1, 1954 TOP 10 HIT; Oscar-nominated	(with Percy Faith's orchestra) released both as a single and on the album Love Me or Leave Me; 1,000,000+ sales
"I'll Remember April"	Gene DePaul	Patricia Johnston; Don Raye	October 22, 1957	from the album Hooray for Hollywood (Vol. 1)
"I'll See You in My Dreams"	Isham Jones	Gus Kahn	November 13, 1951 TOP 10 ALBUM HIT	(with the Norman Luboff Choir and Paul Weston's orchestra) released both as a single and on the album of the same name
"I'll String Along with You"	Harry Warren	Al Dubin	December 28, 1948	(duet with Buddy Clark, George Siravo orchestra)
"I Love Paris"	Cole Porter		February 11, 1960	from the album Show Time
"I Love the Way You Say Goodnight"	George Wyle	Edward Pola	August 21, 1950 TOP 30 HIT	(with the Norman Luboff Choir and the Buddy Cole Quartet) released both as a single and on the album Lullaby of Broadway
"Imagination"	Jimmy Van Heusen	Johnny Burke	December 2, 1947	(with George Siravo orchestra) released both as a single and on the album Day Dreams
"I'm an Indian Too"	Irving Berlin		October 8, 1962	from the album Annie Get Your Gun
"I May Be Wrong (But I Think You're Wonderful)"	Henry Sullivan	Harry Ruskin	January 25, 1950	(with Harry James orchestra) released both as a single and on the album Young Man with a Horn
"I'm Beginning to Miss You"	Irving Berlin		December 29, 1948	(with John Rarig's orchestra)
"I'm Beginning to See the Light"	Duke Ellington; Don George; Johnny Hodges; Harry James		September 21, 1964	from the album Doris Day's Sentimental Journey
"I'm Confessin' (That I Love You)"	Doc Daugherty; Al J. Neiburg; Ellis Reynolds		June 17, 1949	(with John Rarig's orchestra and The Mellomen) released both as a single and on the album You're My Thrill, later issued on Day Dreams
"I'm Forever Blowing Bubbles"	John Kellette	"Jaan Kenbrovin" (James Kendis, James Brockman, and Nat Vincent)	March 30, 1951	(duet with Jack Smith, with the Norman Luboff Choir) released both as a single and on the album On Moonlight Bay
"I'm In Love"	Jule Styne	Sammy Cahn	July 7, 1948 from her first film, ROMANCE ON THE HIGH SEAS	(duet with Buddy Clark)
"I'm in the Mood for Love"	Jimmy McHugh	Dorothy Fields	1952	
"I'm Not at All in Love"	Jerry Ross	Richard Adler	June 14, 1957	from the album The Pajama Game
"I'm Still Sitting under the Apple Tree"	Jule Styne	Sammy Cahn	June 11, 1947	
"I'm Sitting on Top of the World"	Ray Henderson	Sam M. Lewis; Joe Young	November 29, 1958	from the album Cuttin' Capers
"In a Shanty in Old Shanty Town"	Ira Schuster; Jack Little	Joe Young	December 8, 1950	(with the Norman Luboff Choir and the Buddy Cole Quartet) released both as a single and on the album Lullaby of Broadway
"The Inch-worm"	Frank Loesser		July 10, 1964	(with Jimmy Joyce and the Children's Chorus) from the album With a Smile and a Song
"I Need Thee Every Hour"			July 11, 1962	from the album You'll Never Walk Alone
"In the Garden"		C. Austin Miles	July 12, 1962	from the album You'll Never Walk Alone
"In the Moon Mist"		Jack Lawrence	January 16, 1946	(with Les Brown's Band of Renown)
"In the Still of the Night"	Cole Porter		October 22, 1957	from the album Hooray for Hollywood (Vol. 1)
"Instant Love"	M. Drake, Spielman		May 12, 1958	Single. Frank De Vol and His Orchestra. Instant Love was the B-side to Everybody Loves a Lover
"I Only Have Eyes for You"	Harry Warren	Al Dubin	July 14, 1950	(with Axel Stordahl's orchestra) released both as a single and on the album Tea for Two
"I Remember You"	Victor Schertzinger	Johnny Mercer	September 21, 1956 CONSIDERED DORIS DAY BEST RECORDED SONG	from the album Day by Day
"I Remember You"	Victor Schertzinger	Johnny Mercer	September 11, 1964	from the album Doris Day's Sentimental Journey
"I Said My Pajamas (and Put on My Pray'rs)"	George Wyle	Edward Pola	January 13, 1950 TOP 20 HIT	(with George Wyle orchestra)
"I See Your Face Before Me"	Arthur Schwartz	Howard Dietz	August 23, 1957	from the album Day by Night
"It All Depends on You"	Ray Henderson	Buddy G. DeSylva; Lew Brown	December 7, 1954	from the album Love Me Or Leave Me
"It Could Happen to You"	Jimmy Van Heusen	Johnny Burke	1946 TOP 10 HIT	(with Les Brown's Band of Renown)
"It Could Happen to You"	Jimmy Van Heusen	Johnny Burke	September 11, 1964	from the album Doris Day's Sentimental Journey
"It Had to Be You"	Isham Jones	Gus Kahn	November 9, 1951	(with Paul Weston's orchestra) released both as a single and on the album I'll See You in My Dreams
"It Happened at the Festival of Roses"	Al Goodhart (or Goodheart); Dick Manning		September 14, 1949	(with George Siravo orchestra)
"It Might as Well Be Spring"	Richard Rodgers	Oscar Hammerstein II	October 22, 1957	from the album Hooray for Hollywood (Vol. 2)
"It's a Great Feeling"	Jule Styne	Sammy Cahn	May 13, 1949 TOP 30 HIT; Oscar-nominated	(with the Mellomen and John Rarig's orchestra)
"It's a Lovely Day Today"	Irving Berlin		September 28, 1950	(with George Siravo orchestra)
"It's a Quiet Town in Cross-Bone County"	Harold Spina	Bob Russell	December 29, 1947	(with The Modernaires)
"It's Been a Long, Long Time"	Jule Styne	Sammy Cahn	September 15, 1964	from the album Doris Day's Sentimental Journey
"It's Better to Conceal Than Reveal"	Leo Robin		May 15, 1949	(duet with Dinah Shore, Hugo Winterhalter's orchestra)
"It's Easy to Remember"	Richard Rodgers	Lorenz Hart	October 22, 1957	from the album Hooray for Hollywood (Vol. 1)
"It's Magic"	Jule Styne	Sammy Cahn	November 12, 1947 from ROMANCE ON THE HIGH SEAS	(with George Siravo orchestra); 1,000,000+ sales; #2 on Billboard chart, Oscar-nominated
"It's Magic"	Jule Styne	Sammy Cahn	June 4, 1952	with Percy Faith and his Orchestra on the album Hooray for Hollywood (Vol. 2)
"It's the Sentimental Thing to Do"	Marvin Fisher	Roy Alfred	December 2, 1947	
"It's You or No One"	Jule Styne	Sammy Cahn	July 7, 1948 from ROMANCE ON THE HIGH SEAS	
"It Takes Time"	Arthur Korb		February 27, 1947 FIRST RECORDED SINGLE FOR COLUMBIA RECORDS/BACKED WITH "PETE"	
"I've Got My Love to Keep Me Warm"	Irving Berlin		October 16, 1957	from the album Hooray for Hollywood (Vol. 2)
"I've Grown Accustomed to His Face"	Frederick Loewe	Alan Jay Lerner	February 18, 1960	from the album Show Time
"I've Never Been in Love Before"	Frank Loesser		September 13, 1950 TOP 20 HIT	(with David Rose's orchestra)
"I've Only Myself to Blame"	Redd Evans; Dave Mann		December 2, 1947	(with George Siravo orchestra) released both as a single and on the album Day Dreams
"I Want to Be Happy"	Vincent Youmans	Irving Caesar	July 25, 1950	(with The Page Cavanaugh Trio) released both as a single and on the album Tea for Two
"I Want to Be Happy"	Vincent Youmans	Irving Caesar	December 20, 1960	from the album Bright and Shiny
"I Wish I Had a Girl"	Grace Leboy Kahn	Gus Kahn	November 13, 1951	(with the Norman Luboff Choir) released both as a single and on the album I'll See You in My Dreams
J
"Julie"	Leith Stevens	Tom Adair	August 10, 1956 TOP 40 HIT/NOMINATED FOR ACADEMY AWARD	title theme from the film of the same name, starring Doris Day and Louis Jourdan
"Just an Old Love of Mine"	Dave Barbour; Peggy Lee		June 11, 1947	
"Just Blew in from the Windy City"	Sammy Fain	Paul Francis Webster	July 16, 1953	from the album, Calamity Jane
"Just One Girl"	Lyn Udall	Karl Kennett	February 13, 1953	with the Norman Luboff Choir from the album By The Light Of The Silvery Moon
"Just One of Those Things"	Cole Porter		December 4, 1950	(with the Frank Comstock orchestra) released both as a single and on the album Lullaby of Broadway
"Just One of Those Things"	Cole Porter		1954	from the album Young at Heart
K
"Keep Smilin', Keep Laughin', Be Happy"			December 23, 1960	from the album Bright and Shiny
"King Chanticleer"	Nat D. Ayer	Seymour Brown	January 30, 1953	with the Norman Luboff Choir from the album By the Light of the Silvery Moon
L
"The Lady's in Love with You"	Burton Lane	Frank Loesser	November 13, 1958	from the album Cuttin' Capers
"The Lamp Is Low"	Peter de Rose; Bert Shefter based on a composition by Maurice Ravel	Mitchell Parish	August 30, 1957	from the album Day by Night
"The Last Mile Home"	Walter Kent; Walton Farrar		June 24, 1949	(with John Rarig's orchestra)
"The Last Time I Saw You"	Marjorie Goetschius; Edna Osser		September 15, 1945	(with Les Brown's Band of Renown)
"Let It Snow! Let It Snow! Let It Snow!"	Jule Styne	Sammy Cahn	June 18, 1964	from The Doris Day Christmas Album
"Let Me Call You Sweetheart"	Leo Friedman	Beth Slater Whitson	May 25, 1967	from the album The Love Album
"Let No Walls Divide"	Martin Broones	William A. Luce	May 3, 1961	from the album An All Star Christmas: "We Wish You the Merriest"
"Let the Little Girl Limbo"	Barry Mann; Cynthia Weil		March 11, 1963 NEVER RELEASED	(with Jack Nitzsche's orchestra) not released in US until compiled in a CD album called The 1960s Singles in 2002
"Let's Face the Music and Dance"	Irving Berlin		October 16, 1957	from the album Hooray for Hollywood (Vol. 2)
"Let's Fly Away"	Cole Porter		November 13, 1958	from the album Cuttin' Capers
"Let's Take an Old-Fashioned Walk"	Irving Berlin		May 6, 1949 TOP 20 HIT	(duet with Frank Sinatra, Ken Lane Singers, Axel Stordahl's orchestra)
"Let's Take a Walk Around the Block"	Harold Arlen	Ira Gershwin; Edgar Yipsel Harburg	November 18, 1958	from the album Cuttin' Capers
"Let's Walk That-a-Way"	Kay Twomey; Fred Wise; Ben Weisman		December 5, 1952	(duet with Johnnie Ray, Paul Weston's orchestra)#4 hit in U.K. 1953
"Life Is Just a Bowl of Cherries"	Ray Henderson	Buddy G. DeSylva; Lew Brown	May 25, 1967	from the album The Love Album
"The Lilac Tree"	George H. Gartlan		July 14, 1964	(with Jimmy Joyce and the Children's Chorus) from the album With a Smile and a Song
"Little Girl Blue"	Richard Rodgers	Lorenz Hart	1962	from the film Billy Rose's Jumbo
"A Little Kiss Goodnight"	Bob Merrill		February 9, 1952 TOP 20 HIT	(duet with Guy Mitchell, Paul Weston's orchestra)
"A Load of Hay"	Michael Feahy; Howard Barnes; Ethelbert Nevin		August 21, 1950	(with The Page Cavanaugh Trio)
"Lollipops and Roses"	Tony Velona		October 29, 1963	from the album Love Him
"The Lord's Prayer"			July 11, 1962	from the album You'll Never Walk Alone
"Losing You"	Jean Renard	Carl Sigman	October 29, 1963	from the album Love Him
"Love Him"	Barry Mann; Cynthia Weil		November 5, 1963	from the album of the same name
"Love Is Here to Stay"	George Gershwin	Ira Gershwin	November 1, 1957	from the album Hooray for Hollywood (Vol. 1)
"Love Me in the Daytime"			January 12, 1959; TOP 40 HIT	RELEASED as a single following minor hit on ANYWAY THE WIND BLOWS;
"Love Me or Leave Me"	Walter Donaldson	Gus Kahn	December 7, 1954 Top 20 hit in the U.K.; #1 TOP SELLING LP OF 1955 in U.S.	from the album of the same name
"Lover Come Back"	Alan Spilton; Frank DeVol		November 21, 1961	(with Frank DeVol's orchestra)
"Love Somebody"	Joan Whitney; Alex Kramer		November 21, 1947	(duet with Buddy Clark, George Siravo orchestra); 1,000,000+ sales #1 HIT RECORD
"Love Ya"	Peter De Rose	Charles Tobias	March 30, 1951	(duet with Jack Smith, Paul Weston's orchestra) released both as a single and on the album On Moonlight Bay
"Lullaby of Broadway"	Harry Warren	Al Dubin	December 8, 1950	(with the Norman Luboff Choir and the Buddy Cole Quartet) from the album of the same name
"Lullaby of Broadway"	Harry Warren	Al Dubin	December 28, 1950	(with Harry James and his orchestra)
M
"Make Someone Happy"	Jule Styne	Adolph Green; Betty Comden	December 20, 1960	from the album Bright and Shiny with Neal Hefti and His Orchestra
"Makin' Whoopee!"	Walter Donaldson	Gus Kahn	November 9, 1951	(duet with Danny Thomas) released both as a single and on the album I'll See You in My Dreams
"Makin' Whoopee!"	Walter Donaldson	Gus Kahn	November 25, 1958	from the album Cuttin' Capers
"Mama, What'll I Do"	Vaughn Horton		November 30, 1949	(with Ray Noble's orchestra)
"Ma Says, Pa Says"	Josef Marais		October 16, 1952 TOP 20 HIT	(duet with Johnnie Ray, Paul Weston's orchestra)
"Mean to Me"	Fred E. Ahlert	Roy Turk	c. December 1954	from the album Love Me or Leave Me
"Meditation"	Antônio Carlos Jobim	Portuguese: Newton Mendonça; English: Norman Gimbel	November 2, 1964	from the album Latin for Lovers
"Me Too (Ho Ha! Ho Ha!)"	Harry M. Woods	Charles Tobias; Al Sherman	November 29, 1958	from the album Cuttin' Capers
"Mister Tap Toe"	Terry Gilkyson; Richard Dehr; Frank Miller		October 16, 1952 TOP 10 HIT on Billboard chart	(with the Norman Luboff Choir and Paul Weston's orchestra)
"Mood Indigo"	Duke Ellington; Irving Mills; Barney Bigard		December 11, 1959	(with Harry Zimmerman's orchestra) from the album What Every Girl Should Know
"Moonglow"	Will Hudson; Irving Mills	Eddie De Lange	August 30, 1957	from the album Day by Night
"Moonshine Lullaby"	Irving Berlin		October 8, 1962	from the album Annie Get Your Gun
"Moon Song"	Arthur Johnston	Sam Coslow	August 23, 1957	from the album Day by Night
"More"	Riz Ortolani; Nino Oliviero	Norman Newell	October 29, 1963	from the album Love Him
"The More I See You"	Harry Warren	Mack Gordon	September 21, 1964	from the album Doris Day's Sentimental Journey
"Move Over, Darling"	Terry Melcher; Hal Kantor; Joe Lubin		August 30, 1963 TOP 50 HIT (#8 IN THE UK)	(with Jack Nitsche's orchestra)
"My Buddy"	Walter Donaldson	Gus Kahn	November 9, 1951	(with Paul Weston's orchestra) released both as single and on the album I'll See You in My Dreams
"My Darling, My Darling"	Frank Loesser		October 5, 1948 #7 on Billboard chart	(duet with Buddy Clark, George Siravo orchestra) biggest-selling version was by Jo Stafford and Gordon MacRae
"My Dream Is Yours"	Harry Warren	Ralph Blane	April 19, 1949 TOP 20 HIT	(with George Siravo orchestra)
"My Dreams Are Getting Better All The Time"	Vic Mizzy	Manny Curtis	April 25, 1945 #1 HIT	(with Les Brown's Band of Renown); 1,000,000+ sales
"My Kinda Love"	Louis Alter	Jo Trent	December 17, 1959	(with Harry Zimmerman's orchestra) from the album What Every Girl Should Know
"My Love and Devotion"	Milton Carson		1952 #10 UK HIT	(with Percy Faith's orchestra)
"My Number One Dream Came True"	Les Brown	Bud Green	June 20, 1946	(with Les Brown's Band of Renown)
"My Ship"	Kurt Weill	Ira Gershwin	May 3, 1961	from the album I Have Dreamed
"My One and Only Love"	Guy Wood	Robert Mellin	December 16, 1961	(with the André Previn Orchestra) from the album Duet
"My Romance"	Richard Rodgers	Lorenz Hart	1962	from the film Billy Rose's Jumbo
"My Young and Foolish Heart"	Al Lewis; Murray Mencher; Charles Tobias		February 27, 1947	
N
"Nearer My God to Thee"	Lowell Mason	Sarah F. Adams	July 11, 1962	from the album You'll Never Walk Alone
"Never Look Back"	Chilton Price		December 4, 1954	released both as single and on the album Love Me or Leave Me
"Nice Work if You Can Get It"	George Gershwin	Ira Gershwin	October 16, 1957	from the album Hooray for Hollywood (Vol. 2)
"Night and Day"	Cole Porter		November 19, 1957	from the album Hooray for Hollywood (Vol. 1)
"Night Life"	Willie Nelson; Paul Buskirk; Walt Breeland		November 5, 1963	from the album Love Him
"The Night We Called it A Day"	Matt Dennis	Tom Adair	August 30, 1957	from the album Day by Night
"Nobody's Heart"	Richard Rodgers	Lorenz Hart	November 30, 1961	(with the André Previn Orchestra) from the album Duet
"Nobody's Sweetheart"	Elmer Schoebel; Billy Meyers	Ernie Erdman; Gus Kahn	November 13, 1951	(with the Norman Luboff Choir) released both as single and on the album I'll See You in My Dreams
"No Two People"	Frank Loesser		August 4, 1952 TOP 20 HIT	(duet with Donald O'Connor, Paul Weston's orchestra)
"Not Only Should You Love Him"	Leo Robin		December 22, 1959	(with Harry Zimmerman's orchestra) from the album What Every Girl Should Know
"(Now & Then There's) A Fool Such as I"	Bill Trader		November 5, 1963	from the album Love Him
"(Where Are you) Now That I Need You"	Frank Loesser		March 23, 1949 TOP 20 HIT	(with The Mellomen)
O
"Oh, But I Do"	Arthur Schwartz	Leo Robin	November 5, 1957	from the album Hooray for Hollywood (Vol. 2)
"Oh, How I Miss You Tonight"	Joe Burke; Mark Fisher	Benny Davis	June 9, 1967	from the album The Love Album
"Ohio"	Leonard Bernstein	Betty Comden; Adolph Green	February 18, 1960	from the album Show Time
"Oh Me! Oh My! Oh You!"	Vincent Youmans	Ira Gershwin	July 25, 1950	(duet with Gene Nelson & The Page Cavanaugh Trio) released both as single and on the album Tea for Two
"Oh What a Beautiful Dream"	Joe Hooven; Marilyn Hooven	By Dunham	May 2, 1961	from the album I Have Dreamed
"Once-a-Year Day"	Jerry Ross	Richard Adler	June 14, 1957	(with John Raitt and Ensemble) from the album The Pajama Game
"The One I Love (Belongs to Somebody Else)"	Isham Jones	Gus Kahn	November 9, 1951	(with Paul Weston's orchestra) released both as single and on the album I'll See You in My Dreams
"On Moonlight Bay"	Percy Wenrich	Edward Madden	March 23, 1951	(with the Norman Luboff Choir) released both as a single and on the album of the same name
"On the Street Where You Live"	Frederick Loewe	Alan Jay Lerner	February 11, 1960	from the album Show Time
"On the Sunny Side of the Street"	Jimmy McHugh	Dorothy Fields	December 20, 1960	from the album Bright and Shiny
"Oops"	Harry Warren	Johnny Mercer	September 12, 1951 TOP 40 HIT	(with Paul Weston's orchestra)
"Oo-Wee Baby"	Barry Mann; Cynthia Weil		June 12, 1964	(with Thomas E. Oliver's orchestra) not released in US until compiled in CD album called The 1960s Singles in 2002
"Orange Colored Sky"	Milton De Lugg; William Stein		August 21, 1950 TOP 50 HIT	(with the Page Cavanaugh Trio)
"Our Day Will Come"	Mort Garson	Bob Hilliard	November 5, 1964	from the album Latin for Lovers
"Over and Over Again"	Richard Rodgers	Lorenz Hart	1962	from the film Billy Rose's Jumbo
"Over the Rainbow"	Harold Arlen	E.Y. Harburg	November 5, 1957	from the album Hooray for Hollywood (Vol. 1)
P
"Papa, Won't You Dance with Me?"	Jule Styne	Sammy Cahn	September 3, 1947 TOP 20 HIT; BIG SELLER	(with Lou Bring orchestra)
"The Party's Over"	Jule Styne	Betty Comden; Adolph Green	October 30, 1956	(with Frank De Vol's orchestra)
"Pennies from Heaven"	Arthur Johnston	Johnny Burke	November 12, 1957	from the album Hooray for Hollywood (Vol. 2)
"People Will Say We're in Love"	Richard Rodgers	Oscar Hammerstein II	February 25, 1960	from the album Show Time
"A Perfect Understanding"	Fred Spielman	Milton Drake	February 7, 1959	(with Frank DeVol's orchestra)
"Perhaps, Perhaps, Perhaps"	Osvaldo Farrés	Spanish: Osvaldo Farrés; English: Joe Davis	November 5, 1964 FEATURED IN SEVERAL FILMS IN 2007 2008 AND 2009	(with Mort Garson's orchestra) from the album Latin for Lovers
"Periwinkle Blue"	Jerry Livingston	Paul Francis Webster	May 3, 1961	from the album I Have Dreamed
"Pete"	Lanny Grey FIRST SINGLE RELEASE FOR COLUMBIA RECORDS B/W "IT TAKES TIME"		February 27, 1947	
"Pillow Talk"	Buddy Pepper; Inez James		July 23, 1959	(with Jack Marshall's Orchestra)
"Please Don't Eat the Daisies"	Joe Lubin		January 7, 1960	(with Bill Marx's orchestra)
"Please Don't Talk About Me When I'm Gone"	Sam H. Stept	Sidney Clare	December 4, 1950	(with the Frank Comstock orchestra) released both as single and on the album Lullaby of Broadway
"Por Favor"	Joe Sherman; Noël Regney		November 9, 1964	from the album Latin for Lovers
"Powder Your Face with Sunshine"	Carmen Lombardo; Stanley Rochinski		December 28, 1948	(duet with Buddy Clark, George Siravo's orchestra)Top 20 hit in 1949
"Pretty Baby"	Tony Jackson; Egbert Van Alstyne	Gus Kahn	November 12, 1947	(with George Siravo's orchestra) Often erroneously shown w/Harry James as bandleader
"The Prodigal Son"			July 12, 1962	from the album You'll Never Walk Alone
"Pumpernickel"	Sam Coslow		September 5, 1950	(with Frank Yankovic & his Yanks)
"Put 'em in a Box, Tie 'em with a Ribbon"	Jule Styne	Sammy Cahn	November 26, 1947 from ROMANCE ON THE HIGH SEAS	(with George Siravo's orchestra)
Q
"Quicksilver"	Irving Taylor; George Wyle; Eddie Pola		October 19, 1949	(as "Doris Day with her Country Cousins"); Top 20 Billboard hit
"Quiet Nights of Quiet Stars"	Antonio Carlos Jobim	Gene Lees	November 2, 1964	from the album Latin for Lovers
R
"Rainbow's End"	Denis King; John Junkin		May 25, 1964	(with Jack Nitsche's orchestra)
"Ready, Willing and Able"	Floyd Huddleston; Dick Gleason; Al Rinker		October 8, 1954	from the album Young at Heart #7 on U.K. charts
"A Red Kiss on a Blue Letter"	Redd Evans; Roger Genger; George Lang		February 7, 1945	(with Les Brown's Band of Renown)
"Remind Me"	Jerome Kern	Dorothy Fields	November 30, 1961	(with the André Previn Orchestra) from the album Duet
"Ridin' High"			December 19, 1960	from the album Bright and Shiny
"The River Seine"	Guy La Forge	(English) Allan Roberts; Alan Holt	September 14, 1949	(with George Siravo orchestra)
S
"Sam, the Old Accordion Man"	Walter Donaldson		December 7, 1954	from the album Love Me or Leave Me
"Save a Little Sunbeam (for a Rainy, Rainy Day)"	Irving Gordon		November 30, 1949	(with Ray Noble orchestra)
"Say Something Nice About Me"	Sam Stept		September 3, 1947	
"Scarlet Ribbons (For Her Hair)"	Evelyn Danzig	Jack Segal	July 12, 1962	from the album You'll Never Walk Alone
"Secret Love"	Sammy Fain	Paul Francis Webster	August 5, 1953	released both as a single and on the album, Calamity Jane; 1,000,000+ sales; charted at #1 in the U.S. and U.K.; Grammy Hall of Fame Award 1999
"Send Me No Flowers"	Burt Bacharach	Hal David	September 11, 1964	(with Mort Garson's orchestra)
"Sentimental Journey"	Les Brown; Ben Homer	Bud Green	November 20, 1944	(with Les Brown's Band of Renown); 5,000,000+ sales, #1 on charts
"Sentimental Journey"	Les Brown; Ben Homer	Bud Green	September 11, 1964	from the album Doris Day's Sentimental Journey Grammy Hall of Fame 1998
"Serenade in Blue"	Harry Warren	Mack Gordon	September 15, 1964	from the album Doris Day's Sentimental Journey
"Seven and a Half Cents"	Jerry Ross	Richard Adler	June 14, 1957	(with Jack Straw and Ensemble) from the album The Pajama Game
"Shaking the Blues Away"	Irving Berlin		c. December 1954	from the album Love Me Or Leave Me
"Shanghai"	Milton De Lugg	Bob Hilliard	May 15, 1951 #7 on Billboard chart; #9 on Cash Box chart	(with the Norman Luboff Choir and Paul Weston's orchestra)
"Should I Surrender?"	Adam Ross; William Landau		November 21, 1961	(with Frank DeVol's orchestra)
"Silver Bells"	Jay Livingston	Ray Evans	September 28, 1950	(with George Siravo orchestra)
"Silver Bells"	Jay Livingston	Ray Evans	June 17, 1964	from The Doris Day Christmas Album
"Since I Fell for You"	Buddy Johnson		November 5, 1963	from the album Love Him
"Singin' in the Rain"	Nacio Herb Brown	Arthur Freed	December 20, 1960	from the album Bright and Shiny
"Sleepy Baby"	Martin Broones	Paul Francis Webster	July 7, 1964	(with Jimmy Joyce and the Children's Chorus) from the album With a Smile and a Song
"Sleepy Lagoon"	Eric Coates	Jack Lawrence	June 6, 1967	from the album The Love Album
"Slightly Out of Tune (Desafinado)"	Antônio Carlos Jobim	Portuguese: Newton Mendonça; English: Jon Hendricks; Jesse Cavanagh	November 2, 1964	from the album Latin for Lovers
"Small Talk"	Jerry Ross	Richard Adler	June 14, 1957	(duet with John Raitt) from the album The Pajama Game
"Snowfall"	Claude Thornhill	Ruth Thornhill	June 17, 1964	from The Doris Day Christmas Album
"Snuggled on Your Shoulder"	Carmen Lombardo	Joe Young	May 25, 1967	from the album The Love Album
"Soft as the Starlight"	Joe Lubin; Jerome Howard		August 30, 1957	from the album Day by Night
"Softly, as I Leave You"	Hal Shaper; Antonio DeVita; Giorgio Calabrese		October 29, 1963	from the album Love Him
"Somebody Loves Me"	George Gershwin	Buddy DeSylva; Ballard McDonald	December 4, 1950	(with the Frank Comstock orchestra) released both as a single and on the album Lullaby of Broadway
"Someday I'll Find You"	Noël Coward		May 5, 1961	from the album I Have Dreamed
"Someone Else's Roses"	Howard Barnes, Harold Fields and Joseph Roncoroni (credited as Milton Carson)		December 31, 1947	(with George Siravo orchestra) from the film My Dream Is Yours
"Someone Like You"	Harry Warren	Ralph Blane	December 31, 1947	(with George Siravo orchestra) from the film My Dream Is Yours
"Something Wonderful"	Richard Rodgers	Oscar Hammerstein II	December 22, 1950	(with Harry Zimmerman's orchestra) from the album What Every Girl Should Know
"Sometimes I'm Happy"	Vincent Youmans	Irving Caesar	June 17, 1949	from the album You're My Thrill, later issued on Day Dreams
"The Song is You"	Jerome Kern	Oscar Hammerstein II	September 17, 1956	from the album Day by Day
"Soon"	Richard Rodgers	Lorenz Hart	October 29, 1957	from the album Hooray for Hollywood (Vol. 2)
"Sooner or Later"	Charles Wolcott	Ray Gilbert	August 28, 1946	(with Les Brown's Band of Renown)Charted at #13
"Sorry"	Gene DePaul	Johnny Mercer	November 4, 1966	
"Stardust"	Hoagy Carmichael	Mitchell Parish	1965	Unable to locate the original recording date. The song appears on the British import compilation Sentimental Journey, 1965 and the compilation album Love & Magic, 2001
"Stars Fell on Alabama"	Frank Perkins	Mitchell Parish	August 27, 1957	from the album Day by Night
"Stay on the Right Side, Sister"	Rube Bloom	Ted Koehler	November 18, 1954	from the album Love Me Or Leave Me
"Stay with the Happy People"			December 19, 1960	from the album Bright and Shiny
"Steppin' Out with My Baby"	Irving Berlin		November 10, 1958	from the album Cuttin' Capers
"Street of Dreams"	Victor Young	Sam M. Lewis	May 25, 1967	from the album The Love Album
"Sugarbush"	Josef Marais		February 7, 1952 TOP TEN CHARTED HIT; #1 ON JUKEBOX HITS; #8 in U.K.	(duet with Frankie Laine, with the Norman Luboff Choir); Based on a traditional Afrikaans song by the name of Suikerbossie; 1,000,000+ sales
"Summer Has Gone"	Gene DiNovi; Bill Comstock		November 2, 1964	from the album Latin for Lovers
"The Surrey With the Fringe on Top"	Richard Rodgers	Oscar Hammerstein II	February 11, 1960	from the album Show Time
"Swinging on a Star"	Jimmy Van Heusen	Johnny Burke	July 10, 1964	(with Jimmy Joyce and the Children's Chorus) from the album With a Smile and a Song
T
"Tacos, Enchiladas and Beans"			November 21, 1947	
"Teacher's Pet"	Joe Lubin		November 1, 1957 TOP 40 HIT	(with Frank De Vol's orchestra)
"Tea for Two"	Vincent Youmans	Irving Caesar	July 14, 1950	(with Axel Stordahl's orchestra) released both as a single and on the album Tea for Two;
"Tell Me, Tell Me, Dreamface"	Duke Ellington	Don George	February 27, 1947	
"Tell Me (Tell Me Why)"	Max Kortlander	J. Will Callahan	March 23, 1951	(with Paul Weston's orchestra) released both as a single and on the album On Moonlight Bay
"Ten Cents A Dance"	Richard Rodgers	Lorenz Hart	December 30, 1954	from the album Love Me Or Leave Me
"Ten Thousand Four Hundred And Thirty-Two Sheep"	Jule Styne	Sammy Cahn	October 23, 1950	(with David Rose's orchestra)
"That Certain Party"	Walter Donaldson	Gus Kahn	October 10, 1948	(duet with Buddy Clark)
"That Old Black Magic"	Harold Arlen	Johnny Mercer	November 12, 1957	from the album Hooray for Hollywood (Vol. 2)
"That Old Feeling"	Sammy Fain	Lew Brown	December 29, 1948	from the album You're My Thrill, later issued on Day Dreams
"That's the Way He Does It"	Buddy Pepper; Inez James		September 3, 1947	(with Lou Bring orchestra)
"There Once Was a Man"	Jerry Ross	Richard Adler	June 14, 1957	(duet with John Raitt) from the album The Pajama Game
"There's A Rising Moon"	Sammy Fain	Paul Francis Webster	September 24, 1954	from the album Young at Heart
"There's Good Blues Tonight"	Edna Osser; Glenn Osser		February 25, 1946	(with Les Brown's Band of Renown)
"There's No Business Like Show Business"	Irving Berlin		1962 Also recorded in 1948 with Frank Sinatra as a duet	(duet with Robert Goulet, Franz Allers Orchestra) from the album Annie Get Your Gun
"There They Are"	Carter Wright; Donald Borzage	Paul Francis Webster	January 21, 1946	(with Mort Garson's orchestra)
"There Will Never Be Another You"	Harry Warren	Mack Gordon	September 26, 1956	from the album Day by Day
"They Say It's Wonderful"	Irving Berlin		February 18, 1960	from the album Show Time
"They Say It's Wonderful"	Irving Berlin		October 8, 1962	(duet with Robert Goulet) from the album Annie Get Your Gun
"This Can't Be Love"	Richard Rodgers	Lorenz Hart	1962	from the film Billy Rose's Jumbo
"Thoughtless"	Carl Lampl	Buddy Kaye	December 29, 1947	(with The Modernaires)
"Three Coins in the Fountain"	Jule Styne	Sammy Cahn	October 22, 1957	from the album Hooray for Hollywood (Vol. 2)
"Till the End of Time"	Buddy Kaye; Ted Mossman		May 17, 1945	(with Les Brown's Band of Renown) #3 charted hit
"Till We Meet Again"	Richard Whiting	Raymond B. Egan	March 23, 1951	released both as a single and on the album On Moonlight Bay
"Till My Love Comes to Me"	Based on Mendelssohn's "On Wings of Song"	Paul Francis Webster	September 24, 1954	from the album Young at Heart
"Time to Say Goodnight"	John Rotella		May 2, 1961	from the album I Have Dreamed
"'Tis Harry I'm Plannin' to Marry"	Sammy Fain	Paul Francis Webster	July 16, 1953	from the album, Calamity Jane
"Too Marvelous For Words"	Richard A. Whiting	Johnny Mercer	January 25, 1950	(with Harry James Quintet) released both as a single and on the album Young Man with a Horn
"Toyland"	Victor Herbert	Glen McDonough	June 16, 1964	from The Doris Day Christmas Album
"Twinkle and Shine"			December 23, 1960	from the album Bright and Shiny
"Twinkle Lullaby"	Joe Lubin		August 30, 1963	(with Jack Nitsche's orchestra)
U
"Under a Blanket of Blue"	Jerry Livingston	Al J. Neiburg; Marty Symes	August 23, 1957	from the album Day by Night
V
"Very Good Advice"	Sammy Fain	Bob Hilliard	February 28, 1951	(with the Four Hits and Leith Stevens's orchestra)
"A Very Precious Love"	Sammy Fain	Paul Francis Webster	November 19, 1957	(with Frank De Vol's orchestra) Charted at #16 in U.K., 1958
"The Very Thought Of You"	Ray Noble		January 25, 1950	(with Harry James and his orchestra) released both as a single and on the album Young Man with a Horn
W
"Wait Till You See Him"	Richard Rodgers	Lorenz Hart	December 16, 1961	(with the André Previn Orchestra) from the album Duet
"Walk with Him"			July 11, 1962	from the album You'll Never Walk Alone
"The Way You Look Tonight"	Jerome Kern	Dorothy Fields	November 12, 1957	from the album Hooray for Hollywood (Vol. 1)
"We'll Be Together Again"	Carl T. Fischer	Frankie Laine	November 5, 1945	(with Les Brown's Band of Renown)
"We'll Love Again"	Jay Livingston	Ray Evans	May 3, 1961 Also featured in the film, THE MAN WHO KNEW TOO MUCH (February 24, 1956)	from the album I Have Dreamed
"What Does a Woman Do?"	Allie Wrubel	Maxwell Anderson	December 22, 1959	(with Harry Zimmerman's orchestra) from the album What Every Girl Should Know
"What Does a Woman Do?"	Allie Wrubel	Maxwell Anderson	January 7, 1960	(with Bill Marx's orchestra)
"Whatever Will Be, Will Be (Que Sera, Sera)"	Jay Livingston	Ray Evans	February 24, 1956	(with Frank De Vol's orchestra); 1,000,000+ sales; charted at #1 in the U.K., Australia & France, and #2 in the U.S.; Grammy Hall of Fame 2012
"Whatever Will Be, Will Be (Que Sera, Sera)"	Jay Livingston	Ray Evans	July 7, 1964	(with Jimmy Joyce and the Children's Chorus) from the album With a Smile and a Song
"What Every Girl Should Know"	David Holt	Robert Wells	December 11, 1959	(with Harry Zimmerman's orchestra) from the album of the same name
"What's the Use of Wond'rin'?"	Richard Rodgers	Oscar Hammerstein II	December 11, 1959	(with Harry Zimmerman's orchestra) from the album What Every Girl Should Know
"When I Fall in Love"	Victor Young	Edward Heyman	May 6, 1952 TOP 10 HIT	(with the Norman Luboff Choir and Percy Faith's orchestra)
"When I Grow Too Old to Dream"	Sigmund Romberg	Oscar Hammerstein II	May 5, 1961	from the album I Have Dreamed
"When I'm Not Near the Boy I Love"	Burton Lane	E.Y. Harburg	February 11, 1960	from the album Show Time
"When the Red, Red Robin (Comes Bob, Bob, Bobbin' Along)"	Harry M. Woods		1953/4	from the album, The Voice of Your Choice. With Paul Weston and His Orchestra
"When You're Smiling"	Larry Shay; Mark Fisher	Joe Goodwin	December 17, 1959	(with Harry Zimmerman's orchestra) from the album What Every Girl Should Know
"When Your Lover Has Gone"			December 29, 1948	from the album You're My Thrill, later issued on Day Dreams
"White Christmas"	Irving Berlin)		June 17, 1964	from The Doris Day Christmas Album
"Who Are We to Say (Obey Your Heart)"	Sigmund Romberg	Gus Kahn	December 16, 1961	(with the André Previn Orchestra) from the album Duet
"Who Knows What Might Have Been?"	Jule Styne	Adolph Green; Betty Comden	November 21, 1961	(with Frank DeVol's orchestra)
"The Whole World Is Singing My Song"	Vic Mizzy	Manny Curtis	June 20, 1946 TOP 20 HIT	(with Les Brown's Band of Renown)Charted at #6
"Why Can't I?"	Richard Rodgers	Lorenz Hart	1962	(with Martha Raye) from the film Billy Rose's Jumbo
"Why Don't We Do this More Often?"	Allie Wrubel	Charles Newman	November 13, 1958	from the album Cuttin' Capers
"Winter Wonderland"	Felix Bernard	Richard B. Smith	June 16, 1964	from The Doris Day Christmas Album
"With a Smile and a Song"	Frank Churchill	Larry Morey	July 7, 1964	(with Jimmy Joyce and the Children's Chorus) from the album of the same name
"With a Song in My Heart"	Richard Rodgers	Lorenz Hart	January 27, 1950 from Top Ten Albums of 1950	(with Harry James Quintet) released both as a single and on the album Young Man with a Horn
"A Woman's Touch"			July 17, 1953	from the album, Calamity Jane
"A Wonderful Guy"	Richard Rodgers	Oscar Hammerstein II	February 18, 1960	from the album Show Time
"Wonderful One"	Ferde Grofé; Paul Whiteman	Theodora Morse)	June 9, 1967	from the album The Love Album
"Would I Love You, Love You, Love You"	Harold Spina	Bob Russell	December 28, 1950 TOP 10 Billboard Hit	(with Harry James and his orchestra)
"Wrap Your Troubles in Dreams (And Dream Your Troubles Away)"	Harry Barris	Billy Moll; Ted Koehler	August 27, 1957	from the album Day by Night
Y
"Yes"	André Previn	Dory Langdon Previn	November 30, 1961	(with the André Previn Orchestra) from the album Duet
"You Are My Sunshine"	Jimmie Davis; Charles Mitchell; Paul Rice		September 5, 1950	(with Frank Yankovic & his Yanks)
"You Can Have Him"	Irving Berlin		May 15, 1949	(duet with Dinah Shore, Hugo Winterhalter's orchestra)
"You Can't Get A Man with A Gun"	Irving Berlin		October 8, 1962	from the album Annie Get Your Gun
"You Can't Have Everything"	Harry Revel	Mack Gordon	December 17, 1959	(with Harry Zimmerman's orchestra) from the album What Every Girl Should Know
"You Do Something to Me"	Cole Porter		August 27, 1957	from the album Day by Night
"You Go to My Head"	J. Fred Coots	Haven Gillespie	March 2, 1949	(with George Siravo orchestra) released both as a single and on the album You're My Thrill, later issued on Day Dreams
"You'll Never Know"	Harry Warren	Mack Gordon	November 5, 1957	from the album Hooray for Hollywood (Vol. 2)
"You'll Never Walk Alone"	Richard Rodgers	Oscar Hammerstein II	July 13, 1962	from the album of the same name
"You Love Me"	Jule Styne	Sammy Cahn	September 13, 1950	(with David Rose's orchestra)
"You Made Me Love You (I Didn't Want To Do It)"	James V. Monaco	Joseph McCarthy	November 18, 1954	from the album Love Me Or Leave Me
"You My Love"	Jimmy Van Heusen	Mack Gordon	September 24, 1954	from the album Young at Heart
"You're Getting to Be a Habit with Me"	Harry Warren	Al Dubin	December 4, 1950	(with the Frank Comstock orchestra) released both as single and on the album Lullaby of Broadway
"You're My Thrill"	Jay Gorney	Sidney Clare	May 13, 1949	(with The Mellomen) released both as single and on the album You're My Thrill, later issued on Day Dreams
"Your Eyes Have Told Me So"	Walter Blaufuss	Gustave Kahn; Egbert Van Alstyne	February 13, 1953	from the album By The Light Of The Silvery Moon
"You Should Have Told Me"	Bobby Barnes; Lewis Bellin; Redd Evans		August 29, 1946	(with Les Brown's Band of Renown)
"You Stepped Out of a Dream"	Nacio Herb Brown	Gus Kahn	May 5, 1961	from the album I Have Dreamed
"You Was"	Sonny Burke	Paul Francis Webster	December 15, 1948	(duet with Buddy Clark, Mitchell Ayres orchestra)
"You Won't Be Satisfied (Until You Break My Heart)"	Teddy Powell; Larry Stock		November 5, 1945 #4 HIT OF 1946	(with Les Brown's Band of Renown)
Z
"Zip-a-dee-doo-dah"	Allie Wrubel	Ray Gilbert	July 10, 1964	(with Jimmy Joyce and the Children's Chorus) from the album With a Smile and a Song
