= Cuttin' Capers =

"Cuttin' Capers" may refer to:

- "Cuttin' Capers" (song), a popular tune written by Earl Burtnett, Gus Chandler, Bert White, and Henry Cohen in 1915
- Cuttin' Capers (album), a 1959 Doris Day album
