= What Every Girl Should Know (album) =

Studio album by Doris Day
- Released: March 21, 1960
- Recorded: December 1959
- Genre: Pop
- Label: Columbia

Doris Day chronology
| Listen to Day (1959) | What Every Girl Should Know (1960) | Show Time (1960) |

Professional ratings
Review scores
| Source | Rating |
|---|---|
| Allmusic | 2.5/5 stars |

What Every Girl Should Know is an album recorded by Doris Day in December, 1959 and issued by Columbia Records on March 21, 1960 as catalog number CS-8234. Doris Day was backed by Harry Zimmerman's Orchestra.

The album was combined with Day's 1961 album, I Have Dreamed, on a compact disc, issued in 2001.

== Track listing ==
The tracks on the album were:

| No. | Title | Writer(s) | Date recorded | Length |
|---|---|---|---|---|
| 1. | "What Every Girl Should Know" | Robert Wells, David Jack Holt | December 11, 1959 | 3:01 |
| 2. | "Mood Indigo" | Duke Ellington, Irving Mills, Barney Bigard | December 11, 1959 | 3:53 |
| 3. | "When You're Smiling" | Mark Fisher, Larry Shay, Joe Goodwin | December 17, 1959 | 2:38 |
| 4. | "A Fellow Needs a Girl" | Oscar Hammerstein II, Richard Rodgers | December 11, 1959 | 3:11 |
| 5. | "My Kinda Love" | Jo Trent, Louis Alter | December 17, 1959 | 2:45 |
| 6. | "What's the Use of Wond'rin'?" | Oscar Hammerstein II, Richard Rodgers | December 11, 1959 | 2:36 |
| 7. | "Something Wonderful" | Oscar Hammerstein II, Richard Rodgers | December 22, 1959 | 2:51 |
| 8. | "A Hundred Years from Today" | Ned Washington, Victor Young, Joe Young | December 17, 1959 | 3:34 |
| 9. | "You Can't Have Everything" | Mack Gordon, Harry Revel | December 17, 1959 |
| 10. | "Not Only Should You Love Him" | Sid Robin | December 22, 1959 |
| 11. | "What Does a Woman Do?" | Allie Wrubel, Maxwell Anderson | December 22, 1959 |
| 12. | "The Everlasting Arms" | Paul Francis Webster, Martin Broones | December 22, 1959 |

== Personnel ==
- Doris Day - vocals
- Harry Zimmerman - conductor
- Ted Coconis - artwork
