= Love Him =

"Love Him" can refer to:

- Love Him (album), a 1963 Doris Day album
  - "Love Him" (song), the album's title track, a lyrical variation of "Love Her" by Barry Mann and Cynthia Weil
