= You're My Thrill (Doris Day album) =

Studio album by Doris Day
- Released: August 1, 1949
- Label: Columbia

Doris Day chronology
You're My Thrill (1949)	Young Man with a Horn (1950)

You're My Thrill is the debut album by Doris Day, issued on August 1, 1949 by Columbia Records as catalog number CL-6071, as a 10" LP. At the same time, Columbia issued it as an album set of 78 rpm records as C-189.

== Legacy information ==
One of the tracks, "Bewitched, Bothered & Bewildered", was also issued as a single (Columbia catalog number 38698, 7" LP 1-480), reaching #9 on the Billboard chart in 1950. While the author of Discovering Doris states that "each [track] had been previously available on four 78-rpm singles," this is incorrect; all eight selections on You're My Thrill were newly released with the album itself, and the single release of "Bewitched" was spun off after the fact and not released until February 1950. Columbia 38698/1-480 combined "Bewitched" with "Imagination," a track recorded in 1947 and previously released on Columbia 38423.

In 1951, Columbia issued this album as a boxed set of 45 rpm records as B-189. On June 13, 1955, the same tracks and 4 others were reissued in the form of a 12" LP, Day Dreams, catalog number CL-624.

On May 31, 2004 the album was reissued, combined with Young at Heart, as a compact disc by Sony BMG Music Entertainment. (In fact, though the CD was entitled You're My Thrill/Young at Heart, the four tracks that were added to You're My Thrill when it was retitled Day Dreams were included, as well as four extra tracks not included in either album originally.)

== Reception ==
Initial critical response to You're My Thrill was quite positive. In a September 17, 1949 review of the album, Billboard wrote "This package should prove to the doubtful that Dodo righteously is one of the greats. She wraps up the eight beautiful standards in her own intimate, throaty style, setting a warm, soft-lights-and-sweet-music mood. [...] Few singers [...] have been able to transfer a sexy sound to wax, as Doris does."

== Track listing ==
You're My Thrill track listing
No.	Title	Writer(s)	Performed with	Length
1.	"You're My Thrill"	Jay Gorney, Sidney Clare	John Rarig & Orchestra	2:56
2.	"Bewitched, Bothered and Bewildered"	Richard Rodgers, Lorenz Hart	The Mellowmen, John Rarig & Orchestra	2:43
3.	"I'm Confessin' (That I Love You)"	Doc Daugherty, Al J. Neiburg, Ellis Reynolds	The Mellowmen, John Rarig & Orchestra	2:45
4.	"Sometimes I'm Happy"	Vincent Youmans, Irving Caesar	The Mellowmen, John Rarig & Orchestra	2:36
5.	"You Go to My Head"	J. Fred Coots, Haven Gillespie	George Siravo & Orchestra	2:52
6.	"I Didn't Know What Time It Was"	Richard Rodgers, Lorenz Hart	The Mellowmen, John Rarig & Orchestra	3:05
7.	"When Your Lover Has Gone"	Einar Aaron Swan	John Rarig & Orchestra	2:58
8.	"That Old Feeling"	Sammy Fain, Lew Brown	John Rarig & Orchestra	3:03
