= Young at Heart (1954 film) =

1955 film by Gordon Douglas

- Theatrical release poster
- Directed by: Gordon Douglas
- Screenplay by: Lenore J. Coffee; Julius J. Epstein; Liam O'Brien (adaptation)
- Story by: Fannie Hurst
- Based on: Sister Act; 1937 story in Hearst's International Cosmopolitan by Fannie Hurst
- Produced by: Henry Blanke
- Starring: Doris Day; Frank Sinatra; Gig Young; Ethel Barrymore
- Cinematography: Ted D. McCord
- Edited by: William H. Ziegler
- Music by: Ray Heindorf
- Production company: Arwin Productions
- Distributed by: Warner Bros. Pictures
- Release date: December 1954
- Running time: 117 minutes
- Country: United States
- Language: English
- Box office: $2.5 million (US)

Young at Heart is a 1954 American musical film starring Doris Day and Frank Sinatra, and directed by Gordon Douglas. Its supporting cast includes Gig Young, Ethel Barrymore, Alan Hale Jr., and Dorothy Malone. The picture was the first of five films that Douglas directed involving Sinatra, and was a remake of the 1938 film Four Daughters.

== Plot ==
When songwriter Alex Burke enters the lives of the musical Tuttle family, each of the three daughters falls for him. The family lives in the fictional town of Strafford, Connecticut. Alex's personality is a match for Laurie Tuttle, and they are seemingly made for each other.

When a friend of Alex's, Barney Sloan, comes to the Tuttle home to help with some musical arrangements, complications arise. Barney's bleak outlook on life couldn't be any more contradictory to Alex's, and Laurie tries to change his negative attitude. Meanwhile, Laurie's two other sisters, Fran, who is engaged to Bob, and Amy, have feelings for Alex.

The family welcomes Barney into their lives, but a feeling of genuine self-worth escapes him, though he is falling in love with Laurie. Alex proposes to Laurie, and she accepts, which causes Fran to finally marry Bob, and devastates Amy. Aunt Jessie is seemingly the only one who knows Amy loves Alex.

When Laurie goes to see Barney about attending the wedding, he tells her he loves her, and that Amy loves Alex, but Laurie doesn't believe him until she goes home and sees Amy crying. She then leaves Alex at the altar, and elopes with Barney.

At Christmas, Laurie and Barney go home for the holiday. Laurie tells Amy how much she loves Barney, and that she is pregnant, though she hasn't told him yet. Amy has since fallen in love with Ernie.

Alex is also there for the holiday, and has found success. With a black cloud perpetually hanging over his head, Barney decides to go with Bob to take Alex to the train. He drops Bob off at the store, and after dropping Alex at the train, he decides to kill himself, feeling that Laurie would be better off with Alex, as he would be a better provider.

Barney drives into oncoming traffic during a snowstorm, with his windshield wipers off. He survives, and, with a newfound affirmation of life, finally writes the song he had been working on, finding his self-esteem in the arms of Laurie and their new baby.

== Cast ==
- Doris Day – Laurie Tuttle
- Frank Sinatra – Barney Sloan
- Gig Young – Alex Burke
- Ethel Barrymore – Jessie Tuttle
- Dorothy Malone – Fran Tuttle
- Elisabeth Fraser – Amy Tuttle
- Robert Keith – Gregory Tuttle
- Alan Hale Jr. – Robert Neary
- Lonny Chapman – Ernest "Ernie" Nichols

== Score and soundtrack ==
When this film was released, the conductor Ray Heindorf was not given credit, because of the new ruling at that time that stated that he had to be credited as a "Music Supervisor and conducted by" policy, which he disliked. This is one of the Warner musicals that bears no credit to any composer or conductor.

Songs from the soundtrack were released as an album by Frank Sinatra and Doris Day, also titled Young at Heart. An abridged EP entitled Frank Sinatra Sings Songs from "Young at Heart" peaked at #11 on Billboard's "Best Selling EP's" chart while the single reached #2 and was considered Sinatra's comeback single after several years away from the top of the pop singles chart. So popular was the song "Young at Heart" that the film was also titled Young at Heart, having had no title until the song's success. The song's popularity led to its being used not only for the title, but also for music over the opening and closing credits.
