= Bright and Shiny =

Studio album by Doris Day
- Released: March 20, 1961
- Genre: Traditional pop
- Length: 31:04
- Label: Columbia

Doris Day chronology
Show Time (1960)	Bright and Shiny (1961)	I Have Dreamed (1961)

Professional ratings
Review scores
Source	Rating
Allmusic	2.5/5 stars
New Record Mirror	4/5

Bright and Shiny is an album released by Columbia Records, featuring Doris Day backed by Neal Hefti's orchestra, on March 20, 1961. It was released in two forms; a monaural LP (catalog number CL-1614) and a stereophonic LP (catalog number CS-8414). A song of the same name was composed especially for this album.

The album was combined with Day's 1959 album, Cuttin' Capers, on a compact disc, issued on November 13, 2001 by Collectables Records.

== Track listing ==
No.	Title	Writer(s)	Length
1.	"Bright and Shiny"	Bob Sherman, Dick Sherman	2:34
2.	"I Want to Be Happy"	Vincent Youmans, Irving Caesar	2:18
3.	"Keep Smilin', Keep Laughin', Be Happy"	Lou Singer	2:56
4.	"Singin' in the Rain"	Nacio Herb Brown, Arthur Freed	2:36
5.	"Gotta Feelin'"	Andy Prince	2:09
6.	"Happy Talk"	Richard Rodgers, Oscar Hammerstein II	3:00
7.	"Make Someone Happy"	Jule Styne, Betty Comden, Adolph Green	3:25
8.	"Ridin' High"	Cole Porter	2:01
9.	"On the Sunny Side of the Street"	Jimmy McHugh, Dorothy Fields	2:39
10.	"Clap Yo' Hands"	George Gershwin, Ira Gershwin	2:59
11.	"Stay with the Happy People"	Bob Hilliard, Jule Styne	2:12
12.	"Twinkle and Shine"	By Dunham	2:15
