= With a Smile and a Song (album) =

Studio album by Doris Day
- Released: October 19, 1964
- Recorded: July 7–14, 1964
- Genre: Children's music
- Label: Columbia
- Producer: Allen Stanton

Doris Day chronology
The Doris Day Christmas Album (1964)	With a Smile and a Song (1964)	Latin for Lovers (1965)

With a Smile and a Song is an album featuring Doris Day and Jimmy Joyce And His Children's Chorus, released by Columbia Records in 1964. It is an anthology of children's classics such as "Getting to Know You" and "Give a Little Whistle". Their recording of "High Hopes", a song popularized by Frank Sinatra, went on to feature in the soundtrack of the animated film Antz.

It was issued as a monophonic album (catalog number CL-2266) and a stereophonic album (catalog number CS-9066). Allyn Ferguson arranged and conducted the album.

== Track listing ==
1. "Give a Little Whistle" (Leigh Harline, Ned Washington) - 2:07
2. "The Children's Marching Song (Nick Nack Paddy Whack)" - 1:54
3. "Getting to Know You" (Richard Rodgers, Oscar Hammerstein II) - 3:05
4. "Zip-a-dee-doo-dah" (Allie Wrubel, Ray Gilbert) - 1:57
5. "The Lilac Tree" (George H. Gartlan) - 2:02
6. "High Hopes" (Jimmy Van Heusen, Sammy Cahn) - 2:17
7. "Do-Re-Mi" (Richard Rodgers, Oscar Hammerstein II) - 2:21
8. "Whatever Will Be, Will Be (Que Sera, Sera)" (Jay Livingston, Ray Evans) (1964 Remake)
9. "The Inch-worm" (Frank Loesser)
10. "Swinging on a Star" (Jimmy Van Heusen, Johnny Burke)
11. "Sleepy Baby" (Martin Broones, Paul Francis Webster)
12. "With a Smile and a Song" (Leigh Harline, Frank Churchill)
