= You'll Never Walk Alone (Doris Day album) =

Studio album by Doris Day
- Released: September 17, 1962
- Label: Columbia
- Producer: Irving Townsend, Jim Harbert

Doris Day chronology
Duet (1962)	You'll Never Walk Alone (1962)	Billy Rose's Jumbo (1962)

You'll Never Walk Alone is an album recorded by Doris Day with Jim Harbert's Orchestra. It was released on September 17, 1962 on Columbia Records. It contains mostly songs of a religious or spiritual nature. On April 23, 2007, it was released together with Hooray for Hollywood, Volume I, as a compact disc by Sony BMG Music Entertainment.

== Track listing ==
Track #	Song	Songwriter(s)
1	"If I Can Help Somebody"	Alma Bazel Androzzo
2	"Nearer My God to Thee"	Sarah Flower Adams, Lowell Mason
3	"The Prodigal Son"	Martin Broones, William Aubert Luce
4	"Abide with Me"	Henry Francis Lyte, William Henry Monk
5	"Bless This House"	Helen Taylor, May H. Morgan
6	"You'll Never Walk Alone"	Richard Rodgers, Oscar Hammerstein II
7	"In the Garden"	C. Austin Miles
8	"Walk with Him"	Henry Vars, William Dunham
9	"Scarlet Ribbons (For Her Hair)"	Evelyn Danzig, Jack Segal
10	"Be Still and Know"	William Aubert Luce
11	"I Need Thee Every Hour"	Annie Hawks, Robert Lowry
12	"The Lord's Prayer"	Albert Hay Malotte

== Personnel ==
- Buddy Cole - piano
- Jim Harbert - arranger, conductor
- Leo Fuchs - photography
