= I Have Dreamed (Doris Day album) =

Studio album by Doris Day
- Released: August 14, 1961
- Recorded: May 2–5, 1961
- Genre: Pop
- Label: Columbia

Doris Day chronology
Bright and Shiny (1961)	I Have Dreamed (1961)	Duet (1962)

Professional ratings
Review scores
Source	Rating
Allmusic	2.5/5 stars
New Record Mirror	4/5

I Have Dreamed is an album recorded by Doris Day in May 1961 and issued by Columbia Records on August 14, 1961, as catalog number CS 8460. Doris Day was backed by Jim Harbert's Orchestra and the cover photography was by Leo Fuchs.

As the name suggests, many of the songs have titles or lyrics referring to dreaming.

An interesting excerpt from the Richard Rodgers Wikipedia page: "After Doris Day recorded "I Have Dreamed" in 1961, he wrote to her and her arranger, James Harbert, that theirs was the most beautiful rendition of his song he had ever heard".

== Chart performance ==
The album debuted on Billboard magazine's 150 Best-Selling Monoraul LP's chart in the issue dated October 8, 1961, peaking at No. 97 during an eight-week run on the chart.

== Track listing ==
1. "I Believe in Dreams" (Jim Harbert) (recorded on May 3, 1961)
2. "I'll Buy That Dream" (Herb Magidson, Allie Wrubel) (recorded on May 2, 1961)
3. "My Ship" (Ira Gershwin, Kurt Weill) (recorded on May 3, 1961) – 4:10
4. "All I Do Is Dream of You" (Arthur Freed, Nacio Herb Brown) (recorded on May 2, 1961) – 3:16
5. "When I Grow Too Old to Dream" (Oscar Hammerstein II, Sigmund Romberg) (recorded on May 5, 1961) – 3:03
6. "We'll Love Again" (Ray Evans, Jay Livingston) (recorded on May 3, 1961) – 4:16
7. "I Have Dreamed" (Oscar Hammerstein II, Richard Rodgers) (recorded on May 5, 1961) – 3:13
8. "Periwinkle Blue" (Paul Francis Webster, Jerry Livingston) (recorded on May 3, 1961)
9. "Some Day I'll Find You" (Noël Coward) (recorded on May 5, 1961)
10. "You Stepped Out of a Dream" (Gus Kahn, Nacio Herb Brown) (recorded on May 5, 1961)
11. "Oh What a Beautiful Dream" (By Dunham, Joe Hooven, Marilyn Hooven) (recorded on May 2, 1961)
12. "Time to Say Goodnight" (John Rotella) (recorded on May 2, 1961)

The album was combined with Day's other album, What Every Girl Should Know, and released on compact disc, issued in 2001.

== Charts ==
Chart (1961)	Peak position
US 150 Best-Selling Monoraul LP's	97
