= Young at Heart (Doris Day and Frank Sinatra album) =

Soundtrack album by Doris Day and Frank Sinatra
- Released: November 1, 1954
- Genre: Traditional pop
- Label: Columbia

Doris Day chronology
Calamity Jane (1953)	Young at Heart (1954)	Love Me or Leave Me (1955)

Frank Sinatra chronology
Swing Easy (1954)	Young at Heart (1954)	In the Wee Small Hours (1955)

Young at Heart was a 10" LP album released by Columbia Records as catalog number CL-6331, on November 1, 1954, containing songs sung by Doris Day and Frank Sinatra from the soundtrack of the movie Young at Heart. The UK version, released by Philips Records as catalog number BBR 8040, featured 5 Doris Day songs (excluding "Just One of Those Things") and 3 Sinatra tracks (replacing "Someone to Watch Over Me" with "You Can Take My Word For It Baby" and "I'm Glad There Is You", which were not featured in the film).

The album debuted on Billboard magazine's Best-Selling Pop LP's chart in the issue dated February 5, 1955, peaking at number 15.

On May 31, 2004 the album was reissued, combined with You're My Thrill, as a compact disc by Sony BMG Music Entertainment. (In fact, though the CD was entitled "You're My Thrill/Young at Heart," the four added tracks that were added to "You're My Thrill" when it was retitled "Day Dreams" were included, as well as four extra tracks not included in either album originally.)

== Track listing ==
(see and)

1. "Till My Love Comes to Me" (Paul Francis Webster, based on Mendelssohn's "On Wings of Song") (Doris Day)
2. "Ready, Willing and Able" (Floyd Huddleston, Al Rinker, Dick Gleason) (Doris Day)
3. "Hold Me in Your Arms" (Ray Heindorf, Charles Henderson, Don Pippin) (Doris Day)
4. "Someone to Watch Over Me" (George Gershwin, Ira Gershwin) (Frank Sinatra)
5. "Just One of Those Things" (Cole Porter) (Doris Day)
6. "There's A Rising Moon" (Sammy Fain, Paul Francis Webster) (Doris Day)
7. "One For My Baby (And One More For The Road)" (Harold Arlen, Johnny Mercer) (Frank Sinatra)
8. "You My Love" (Mack Gordon/Jimmy Van Heusen) (Doris Day)
