= Day by Night =

Studio album by Doris Day
- Released: November 11, 1957
- Genre: Traditional pop
- Label: Columbia

Doris Day chronology
The Pajama Game (1957)	Day by Night (1957)	Hooray for Hollywood (1958)

Professional ratings
Review scores
Source	Rating
Allmusic	3/5 stars

Day by Night was a Doris Day album released on November 11, 1957 by Columbia Records, It was released in two versions, catalog number CL-1053 (Mono) and CS-8089 (Stereo), though the stereo version was only released in 1959. It was a follow-up to her extremely successful album, Day by Day, released the previous year.

The album was combined with Day's 1956 album, Day by Day, on a compact disc, issued on November 14, 2000 by Collectables Records.

== Track listing ==
1. "I See Your Face Before Me" (Howard Dietz, Arthur Schwartz)
2. "Close Your Eyes" (Bernice Petkere)
3. "The Night We Called it a Day" (Matt Dennis, Tom Adair)
4. "Dream a Little Dream of Me" (Fabian Andre, Wilbur Schwandt, Gus Kahn)
5. "Under a Blanket of Blue" (Jerry Livingston, Al J. Neiburg, Marty Symes)
6. "You Do Something to Me" (Cole Porter)
7. "Stars Fell on Alabama" (Frank Perkins, Mitchell Parish)
8. "Moon Song" (Arthur Johnston, Sam Coslow)
9. "Wrap Your Troubles in Dreams" (Harry Barris, Billy Moll, Ted Koehler)
10. "Soft as the Starlight" (Joe Lubin, Jerome Howard)
11. "Moonglow" (Will Hudson, Irving Mills, Eddie DeLange)
12. "The Lamp Is Low" (Maurice Ravel, Peter de Rose, Parish, Bert Shefter)
