= Latin for Lovers =

Studio album by Doris Day
- Released: March 22, 1965
- Recorded: November 2–9, 1964
- Label: Columbia
- Producer: Allen Stanton

Doris Day chronology
With a Smile and a Song (1964)	Latin for Lovers (1965)	Doris Day's Sentimental Journey (1965)

Professional ratings
Review scores
Source	Rating
Allmusic	3/5 stars

Latin for Lovers was a Doris Day album, mostly composed of songs originating in Latin America, released by Columbia Records on March 22, 1965, as a monophonic LP (catalog number CL-2310) and a stereophonic album (catalog number CS-9110).

Although "Fly Me to the Moon" was not of Latin-American origin, it was an early song adapted to the bossa nova dance then becoming popular, and so associated at the time with Latin America.

A Columbia 45RPM single, #4-43278, was released to coincide with the album. It featured How Insensitive as the A-side and Meditation as the B-side. Neither song charted.

The songs were arranged by Mort Garson, who also conducted the orchestra.

The album was reissued in 2001, combined with Doris Day's Sentimental Journey, as a CD.

== Track listing ==
1. "Corcovado" (Antônio Carlos Jobim, Gene Lees) (recorded November 2, 1964) - 2:54
2. "Fly Me to the Moon (In Other Words)" (Bart Howard) (recorded November 5, 1964) - 2:33
3. "Meditation"(Antônio Carlos Jobim, Newton Mendonça, Norman Gimbel) (recorded November 2, 1964) - 2:54
4. "Dansero" (Richard Hayman, Lee Daniels, Sol Parker) (recorded November 9, 1964) - 2:22
5. "Summer Has Gone" (Gene DiNovi, Bill Comstock) (recorded November 2, 1964) - 2:16
6. "How Insensitive" (Antônio Carlos Jobim, Vinícius de Moraes, Norman Gimbel) (recorded November 9, 1964) - 3:39
7. "Slightly Out of Tune (Desafinado)" (Antônio Carlos Jobim, Newton Mendonça, Jon Hendricks, Jesse Cavanagh) (recorded November 2, 1964) - 2:49
8. "Our Day Will Come" (Mort Garson, Bob Hilliard) (recorded November 5, 1964) - 2:40
9. "Be True to Me (Sabor a Mí)" (Mel Mitchell, Alarcon Carillo) (recorded November 5, 1964) - 3:04
10. "Perhaps, Perhaps, Perhaps (Quizás, Quizás, Quizás)" (Osvaldo Farrés, Joe Davis) (recorded November 5, 1964) - 2:31
11. "Be Mine Tonight (Noche De Ronda)" (Maria Teresa Lara, Sunny Skylar) (recorded November 9, 1964) - 3:22
12. "Por Favor" (Joe Sherman, Noel Sherman) (recorded November 9, 1964) - 2:22
