= Day by Day (Doris Day album) =

Studio album by Doris Day
- Released: December 17, 1956
- Recorded: 1956
- Genre: Pop
- Length: 38:27
- Label: Columbia

Doris Day chronology
Day Dreams (1955)	Day by Day (1956)	The Pajama Game (1957)

Professional ratings
Review scores
Source	Rating
Allmusic	4/5 stars

Day by Day is a Doris Day album released by Columbia Records on December 17, 1956. The title is an obvious pun, both meaning "on a daily basis" (as implied in the song title) and "(Doris) Day, in the daytime" (and thus leading to a later album entitled Day by Night). The album was issued as Columbia catalog CL-942.

All tracks have vocals by Day accompanied by Paul Weston's orchestra.

The album was combined with Day's 1957 album, Day by Night, on a compact disc, issued on November 14, 2000 by Collectables Records.

== Chart performance ==
The album debuted on Billboard magazine's Best-Selling LP's chart in the issue dated February 9, 1957, peaking at No. 11 during a six-week run on the chart.

== Track listing ==
1. "The Song Is You" (Jerome Kern, Oscar Hammerstein II) - 3:19
2. "Hello, My Lover, Goodbye" (Johnny Green, Edward Heyman) - 3:38
3. "But Not for Me" (George and Ira Gershwin) - 2:38
4. "I Remember You" (Victor Schertzinger, Johnny Mercer) - 4:02
5. "I Hadn't Anyone Till You" (Ray Noble) - 3:04
6. "But Beautiful" (Jimmy Van Heusen, Johnny Burke) - 3:24
7. "Autumn Leaves" (Joseph Kosma, Jacques Prévert, Johnny Mercer) - 3:03
8. "Don't Take Your Love from Me" (Henry Nemo) - 3:24
9. "There Will Never Be Another You" (Harry Warren, Mack Gordon) - 2:43
10. "Gone with the Wind" (Herbert Magidson, Allie Wrubel) - 2:47
11. "The Gypsy in My Soul" (Clay Boland, Moe Jaffe) - 3:02
12. "Day by Day" (Axel Stordahl, Paul Weston, Sammy Cahn) - 3:23

== Charts ==
Chart (1957)	Peak position
US Billboard Best-Selling LP's	11
