= On Moonlight Bay (album) =

Soundtrack album by Doris Day
- Released: July 2, 1951
- Label: Columbia

Doris Day chronology
Lullaby of Broadway (1951)	On Moonlight Bay (1951)	I'll See You in My Dreams (1951)

On Moonlight Bay is a Doris Day album (released July 2, 1951) featuring songs from the movie of the same name. It was issued by Columbia Records as a 10" LP album, catalog number CL-6186 and as a 78 rpm 4 disc set, catalog number C-267.

The album debuted on Billboard magazine's Best-Selling Popular Record Albums chart in the issue dated August 3, 1951, peaking at No. 3 during an eighteen-week run on the chart.

The album was combined with Day's 1953 album, By the Light of the Silvery Moon, on a compact disc, issued on January 30, 2001, by Collectables Records. Gordon MacRae is not featured on the album, as he was a property of Capitol records and wasn't allowed to sing on this Columbia recording. James Emmons, a contract singer handled by Doris Day's husband, was used in his place on two songs... "Cuddle up a Little Closer" and "Till We Meet Again".

== Track listing ==
1. "On Moonlight Bay" (Percy Wenrich/Edward Madden) (with the Norman Luboff Choir)
2. "Till We Meet Again" (Richard A. Whiting/Raymond B. Egan) (duet with James Emmons)
3. "Love Ya" (Peter DeRose/Charles Tobias) (duet with Jack Smith)
4. "Christmas Story" (Pauline Walsh)
5. "I'm Forever Blowing Bubbles" (John Kellette/Jaan Kenbrovin^{†}) (duet with Jack Smith and the Norman Luboff Choir)
6. "Cuddle up a Little Closer" (Karl Hoschna/Otto Harbach) (duet with James Emmons)
7. "Every Little Movement (Has a Meaning All Its Own)" (Karl Hoschna/Otto Harbach) (with the Norman Luboff Choir)
8. "Tell Me (Why Nights Are So Lonely)" (J. Will Callahan/Max Kortlander)

^{†}Joint pseudonym for James Kendis, James Brockman, and Nat Vincent.

== Charts ==
Chart (1951)	Peak position
US Billboard Best-Selling Popular Record Albums	3
