= Day Dreams (Doris Day album) =

Studio album by Doris Day
- Released: June 13, 1955
- Label: Columbia

Doris Day chronology
Love Me or Leave Me (1955)	Day Dreams (1955)	Day by Day (1956)

Professional ratings
Review scores
Source	Rating
Allmusic	3/5 stars

Day Dreams is the title of a Doris Day album released by Columbia Records on June 13, 1955. The catalog number was CL-624. Eight of the twelve tracks had previously been issued as a 10" LP under the title You're My Thrill.

== Track listing ==
1. "You're My Thrill" (Jay Gorney, Sidney Clare)
2. "Bewitched, Bothered and Bewildered" (Richard Rodgers, Lorenz Hart)
3. "Imagination" (Jimmy Van Heusen, Johnny Burke)
4. "I've Only Myself to Blame" (Redd Evans, Dave Mann)
5. "I'm Confessin' (That I Love You)" (Doc Daugherty, Al J. Neiburg, Ellis Reynolds)
6. "Sometimes I'm Happy" (Vincent Youmans, Irving Caesar)
7. "You Go to My Head" (J. Fred Coots, Haven Gillespie)
8. "I Didn't Know What Time It Was" (Rodgers, Hart)
9. "If I Could Be with You (One Hour Tonight)" (James P. Johnson, Henry Creamer)
10. "Darn That Dream" (Jimmy Van Heusen, Eddie DeLange)
11. "When Your Lover Has Gone" (Einar Aaron Swan)
12. "That Old Feeling" (Sammy Fain, Lew Brown)
