= Hooray for Hollywood (album) =

Studio album by Doris Day
- Released: February 24, 1958
- Genre: Pop
- Label: Columbia

Doris Day chronology
Day by Night (1957)	Hooray for Hollywood (1958)	Cuttin' Capers (1959)

Hooray for Hollywood is a two-album set recorded by Doris Day, released by Columbia Records. Frank De Vol arranged and conducted the orchestra for the recordings. All but one of the songs were recorded between October and November 1957. The collection was to originally feature Day's recording of "A Very Precious Love", but this was released as a single and replaced on the album with the 1952 re-recording of "It's Magic".

The two-album set was released by Columbia under the catalog number C2L-5 on February 24, 1958. It was subsequently reissued as two separate volumes in both monaural and stereophonic versions as indicated below.

== Record 1 ==
The first record was reissued by Columbia as Hooray For Hollywood - Vol. 1 on October 20, 1958. The catalog number of the mono version was CL-1128, and of the stereo version, CS-8066. On April 23, 2007 it was released, together with You'll Never Walk Alone, as a compact disc by Sony BMG Music Entertainment.

=== Track listing ===
1. "Hooray for Hollywood" (Richard A. Whiting, Johnny Mercer) - 2:31
2. "Cheek to Cheek" (Irving Berlin) - 2:42
3. "It's Easy to Remember" (Richard Rodgers, Lorenz Hart) - 3:02
4. "The Way You Look Tonight" (Jerome Kern, Dorothy Fields) - 3:24
5. "I'll Remember April" (Gene DePaul, Patricia Johnston, Don Raye)
6. "Blues in the Night" (Harold Arlen, Mercer) - 3:46
7. "Over the Rainbow" (Arlen, E.Y. Harburg) - 3:37
8. "Our Love Is Here to Stay" (George Gershwin, Ira Gershwin) - 3:47
9. "In the Still of the Night" (Cole Porter) - 2:58
10. "Night and Day" (Porter) - 3:17
11. "You'd Be So Easy to Love" (Porter) - 2:47
12. "I Had the Craziest Dream" (Harry Warren, Mack Gordon) - 3:42

== Record 2 ==
The second record was reissued by Columbia as Hooray For Hollywood - Vol. 2 on January 19, 1959. The catalog number of the mono version was CL-1129, and of the stereo version, CS-8067.

=== Track listing ===
1. "I've Got My Love to Keep Me Warm" (Irving Berlin) - 3:19
2. "Soon" (George Gershwin, Ira Gershwin) - 3:00
3. "That Old Black Magic" (Harold Arlen, Johnny Mercer) - 2:42
4. "You'll Never Know" (Harry Warren, Mack Gordon)
5. "A Foggy Day" (G. Gershwin, I. Gershwin) - 3:30
6. "It's Magic" (Jule Styne, Sammy Cahn) (1952 Re-recording) (with Percy Faith and his Orchestra)
7. "It Might as Well Be Spring" (Richard Rodgers, Oscar Hammerstein II) - 3:39
8. "Nice Work if You Can Get It" (G. Gershwin, I. Gershwin) - 2:52
9. "Three Coins in the Fountain" (Styne, Cahn) - 3:17
10. "Let's Face the Music and Dance" (Berlin) - 3:11
11. "Pennies from Heaven" (Arthur Johnston, Johnny Burke) - 3:32
12. "Oh, But I Do" (Arthur Schwartz, Leo Robin)

The version of "It's Magic" on this album was recorded a number of years previous to this project and only exists as a mono mix.
