= The Gypsy in My Soul =

1934 popular song

"The Gypsy in My Soul" is a popular song written for the 50th anniversary of the University of Pennsylvania Mask and Wig show in 1937 by two Penn graduates, Clay Boland and Moe Jaffe. Boland wrote the music and Jaffe the lyrics. Although both men had long since graduated, it had become the practice at the time for professionals, rather than students, to compose songs for the show.

Although the song did not become a big hit at the time it was written, it has become a classic over the decades, particularly in the jazz repertoire, as it has been recorded by over 100 artists.

== Recorded versions ==
- Louis Armstrong
- Mildred Bailey with Red Norvo's Orchestra recorded on December 19, 1945 and released on Crown 104
- Shirley Bassey on her The Bewitching Miss Bassey (1959)
- Charlie Byrd - instrumental
- June Christy
- Rosemary Clooney - At Long Last (with the Count Basie Orchestra) (1998)
- Perry Como - for his album Saturday Night with Mr. C (1958)
- Bing Crosby recorded the song in 1955 for use on his radio show and it was subsequently included in the box set The Bing Crosby CBS Radio Recordings (1954-56) issued by Mosaic Records (catalog MD7-245) in 2009.
- Johnny Dankworth - Too Cool for the Blues (2010)
- Sammy Davis Jr. with orchestra conducted by Jack Pleis recorded on August 3, 1956 and released on Decca's Sammy Swings (1957)
- Doris Day with orchestra conducted by Paul Weston recorded in 1956 and released on the Columbia album Day by Day
- Connie Evingson
- Ella Fitzgerald on her Verve release Get Happy!
- Eydie Gorme
- Al Hirt on his album, Live at Carnegie Hall (1965)
- Jay and the Americans
- Shirley MacLaine - Live at the Palace
- Melissa Manchester
- Marian McPartland
- Liza Minnelli
- Anita O'Day - An Evening with Anita O'Day (1956)
- Patti Page
- Oscar Peterson - instrumental
- André Previn - instrumental
- Bud Shank and Bob Cooper - instrumental
- Jeri Southern The Dream's on Jeri (1998)
- Jo Stafford with the Art Van Damme Trio recorded on September 30, 1956 and released on the Columbia album Once Over Lightly
- Bobby Troup
- Margaret Whiting with Frank DeVol's Orchestra recorded December 23, 1947 and released on Capitol 15038
- Joe Williams
- Lester Young, Roy Eldridge & "Sweets" Edison - instrumental
- Howard Blake - as an organ trio instrumental, recorded in 1966 with a short guitar solo by John McLaughlin, on the album 'That Hammond Sound'
