= Give a Little Whistle =

Single by Cliff Edwards & Dickie Jones

from the album Pinocchio (Original Motion Picture Soundtrack)
- Released: 1940
- Recorded: 1939
- Genre: Soundtrack
- Length: 1:38
- Songwriters: Leigh Harline, Ned Washington

"Give a Little Whistle" is a song written by Leigh Harline and Ned Washington for Walt Disney's 1940 adaptation of Pinocchio. The original version was sung by Cliff Edwards in the character of Jiminy Cricket and Dickie Jones in the character of Pinocchio, and is teaching how to whistle in the film. It is one of two original songs to not appear in Disney's 2022 live-action remake of the film, along with "Little Wooden Head".

== Other versions ==
- Glenn Miller - recorded January 15, 1940 with vocals by Marion Hutton
- June Christy - on her 1960 album The Cool School.
- Doris Day - included on her 1964 album With a Smile and a Song.
- Julie London - for her 1967 album Nice Girls Don't Stay for Breakfast
