= I'm in Love with a Wonderful Guy =

1949 musical song

Song
- Published: 1949
- Composer: Richard Rodgers
- Lyricist: Oscar Hammerstein II

"I'm in Love with a Wonderful Guy" is a show tune from the 1949 Rodgers and Hammerstein musical South Pacific. It was first introduced by Mary Martin in the original Broadway production and sung by Mitzi Gaynor in the 1958 film adaptation.

In the show, Nellie sings this song after being convinced that, despite the fact that Emile killed a man accidentally in a fight, there is good in him—and so she is elated to be in love with him.

Rodgers and Hammerstein were as inspired by Mary Martin's personality as they were by the character of Nellie Forbush to write this song. They introduced it to Martin one night at Joshua Logan's house fine-tuning the script. Hammerstein wrote this song to express the exuberance of Nellie's character at this point in the show, which carried over to Martin's performance. Martin was so thrilled that when she sang it on stage, she performed cartwheels on the stage at every turn of "I'm in love."

== Other recordings ==
- Hit recordings in 1949 were by Margaret Whiting (No. 12 in the Billboard charts), Fran Warren (#17) and by Dinah Shore (#22).
- On September 22, 1952, Diana Miller with Varietéorkestern Cond.: Åke Jelving, recorded the song in Stockholm. It was released on the 78 rpm record His Master's Voice X 7829.
- In 1960, Doris Day recorded the song in her album Show Time.
- Keely Smith performed the song for the Reprise Musical Repertory Theatre version of "South Pacific" in 1963.
- In 1967, Blossom Dearie recorded the song for her album Soon It's Gonna Rain.
- In 2009, by Nellie McKay on her album Normal as Blueberry Pie – A Tribute to Doris Day.

== In popular culture ==
- In 1953, Mary Martin sang the song before a live television audience of 60 million (broadcast live over the NBC and CBS networks) as part of The Ford 50th Anniversary Show.
- In 1979's "Trust Me", the second episode of television series Benson, the song is partially performed by Caroline McWilliams (as Marcy Hill) while dancing balletically around the kitchen.
- The song is featured in the 2008 video game Fallout 3 and reprised in the 2015 video game Fallout 4. According to the game's credits, the recording was recorded by Tex Beneke's orchestra in 1949. Tex Beneke's album, Here's To the Ladies (Who Sang With the Band), adds the featured vocalist as Claire Chatwin.
- The chorus of the song is performed a cappella by Megan Mullally's character Karen Walker on the sitcom Will & Grace season 6, episode 23 ("I Do, Oh, No, You Di-in't").
- The first scene in the 2015 television series Crazy Ex-Girlfriend is Rachel Bloom's character, Rebecca, performing in the chorus of her camp production of South Pacific during this song. Ten years later, once she sees Josh Chan, the chorus of "I'm in love" repeats in her head when she sees him.
