= Lullaby of Broadway (album) =

Soundtrack album by Doris Day
- Released: March 5, 1951
- Recorded: December 4–8, 1950
- Label: Columbia

Doris Day chronology
Tea for Two (1950)	Lullaby of Broadway (1951)	On Moonlight Bay (1951)

Lullaby of Broadway was a 10-inch LP album of songs performed by Doris Day, released on March 5, 1951, under catalog number CL-6168. The songs were taken from the soundtrack of the movie of the same name, in which she starred.

== Chart performance ==
The album debuted on Billboard magazine's Best-Selling Popular Record Albums chart in the issue dated March 30, 1951, peaking at No. 2 during a twenty-four-week run on the chart, becoming her longest charting album.

== Track listing ==
1. "Lullaby of Broadway" (Harry Warren, Al Dubin) (with the Norman Luboff Choir and the Buddy Cole Quartet) (recorded December 8, 1950) - 2:29
2. "Fine and Dandy" (Kay Swift, Paul James^{†}) (with the Norman Luboff Choir and the Buddy Cole Quartet) (recorded December 8, 1950) - 2:49
3. "In a Shanty in Old Shanty Town" (Ira Schuster, Jack Little/Joe Young) (with the Norman Luboff Choir and the Buddy Cole Quartet) (recorded December 8, 1950) - 2:55
4. "Somebody Loves Me" (George Gershwin, Buddy DeSylva, Ballard MacDonald) (with the Frank Comstock Orchestra) (recorded December 4, 1950) - 2:49
5. "Just One of Those Things" (Cole Porter) (with the Frank Comstock Orchestra) (recorded December 4, 1950)
6. "You're Getting to Be a Habit with Me" (Warren, Dubin) (with the Frank Comstock Orchestra) (recorded December 4, 1950)
7. "I Love the Way You Say Goodnight" (Edward Pola, George Wyle) (with the Norman Luboff Choir and the Buddy Cole Quartet) (recorded December 8, 1950)
8. "Please Don't Talk About Me When I'm Gone" (Sam H. Stept, Sidney Clare) (with the Frank Comstock Orchestra) (recorded December 4, 1950)

^{†}Paul James was the pseudonym of Swift's husband James Warburg.

- This album, combined with Tea for Two, was reissued in compact disc form in 2001.

== Charts ==
Chart (1951)	Peak position
US Billboard Best-Selling Popular Record Albums	2
