= You Should Have Told Me =

Song by Doris Day
- Published: 1946
- Recorded: 1946
- Songwriter(s): Lewis Bellin; Redd Evans; Bob Cavanaugh

"You Should Have Told Me" is a popular song. Credits for its authorship are generally given to Lewis Bellin, Redd Evans and Bob Cavanaugh by ASCAP, the royalty collection agency.

The song was published in 1946, and it was recorded that year by Doris Day, with Les Brown and his Band of Renown.
