= Show Time (Doris Day album) =

Studio album by Doris Day
- Released: July 11, 1960
- Genre: Pop
- Label: Columbia

Doris Day chronology
What Every Girl Should Know (1960)	Show Time (1960)	Bright and Shiny (1961)

Professional ratings
Review scores
Source	Rating
Allmusic	3/5 stars

Show Time is a Doris Day album, primarily consisting of well-known songs from Broadway musicals, released by Columbia Records on July 11, 1960, as a monaural LP album, catalog number CL-1470, and a stereophonic LP album, catalog number CS-8261. Axel Stordahl was the conductor and the cover photographer was Bob Willoughby.

The album was combined with Day's 1963 album, Love Him, on a compact disc, issued on November 14, 2000 by Collectables Records.

== Track listing ==
No.	Title	Writer(s)	Musical	Length
1.	"Show Time"	Joe Lubin		3:04
2.	"I Got the Sun in the Morning"	Irving Berlin	Annie Get Your Gun	3:47
3.	"Ohio"	Leonard Bernstein, Betty Comden, Adolph Green	Wonderful Town	3:02
4.	"I Love Paris"	Cole Porter	Can Can	3:09
5.	"When I'm Not Near the Boy I Love"	Burton Lane, E.Y. Harburg	Finian's Rainbow	2:35
6.	"People Will Say We're in Love"	Richard Rodgers, Oscar Hammerstein II	Oklahoma!	2:51
7.	"I've Grown Accustomed to His Face"	Frederick Loewe, Alan Jay Lerner	My Fair Lady	3:11
8.	"The Surrey with the Fringe on Top"	Rodgers, Hammerstein II	Oklahoma!	2:43
9.	"They Say It's Wonderful"	Berlin	Annie Get Your Gun	2:57
10.	"A Wonderful Guy"	Rodgers, Hammerstein II	South Pacific	2:14
11.	"On the Street Where You Live"	Loewe, Lerner	My Fair Lady
12.	"The Sound of Music" (With Frank DeVol and his Orchestra)	Rodgers, Hammerstein II	The Sound of Music
13.	""Show Time" (reprise)"
