= A Hundred Years from Today =

1933 American popular song

"A Hundred Years from Today" is a popular song published in 1933 with music by Victor Young and lyrics by Ned Washington and Joe Young. The song was included in the London production of Lew Leslie's Blackbirds of 1934.

A recording of "A Hundred Years from Today" by Ethel Waters accompanied by Benny Goodman & His Orchestra was very popular in 1933.

== Other recordings ==
- Jack Teagarden recorded at least four versions of it, the first on November 11, 1933 for Brunswick Records (catalog No. 6716A) which is featured on his album King of the Blues Trombone (1963), another recorded for Decca Records on May 26, 1941 (catalog No. 4317B) that omits the verse, and one in his last album A Hundred Years from Today (1963). The first is sung by Teagarden in the style of smooth singers of the time, the last is bluesy.
- Glen Gray and the Casa Loma Orchestra (vocal by Lee Wiley), recorded February 24, 1934 for Brunswick Records (catalog No.6775).
- Sarah Vaughan - recorded on April 30, 1946 for Musicraft Records (catalog No. 15072).
- Frankie Laine - for his album Mr. Rhythm (1954).
- Joni James covered the song as part of her 1956 songbook album Joni Sings Songs by Victor Young, Songs by Frank Loesser.
- Lee Wiley - in her album A Touch of the Blues (1958).
- Barbara Dane - on Livin' With The Blues (1959)
- Johnnie Ray - for his album A Sinner Am I (1959).
- Doris Day - included in her album What Every Girl Should Know (1960)
- Dean Martin - for his album Cha Cha de Amor (1962)
- Rosemary Clooney - a single release for Reprise Records (1963).
- Frank Sinatra recorded it on the 1984 album L.A. Is My Lady.
- Seth MacFarlane - for his album Blue Skies (2022).
