= The Love Album (Doris Day album) =

Studio album by Doris Day
- Released: 1994
- Recorded: 1967, 1970 (bonus tracks)
- Label: Concord
- Producer: Don Genson

Doris Day chronology
Doris Day's Sentimental Journey (1965)	The Love Album (1994)	My Heart (2011)

Professional ratings
Review scores
Source	Rating
The Encyclopedia of Popular Music	4/5 stars

The Love Album is an album compiled from tracks recorded by Doris Day during three studio sessions arranged and conducted by Sid Feller in Hollywood in 1967, but not released until 1994.

In 2006, the album was reissued in CD form, with extra tracks taken from a Doris Day television special recorded in 1971.

== Track listing ==
1. "For All We Know" (J. Fred Coots, Sam M. Lewis)
2. "Snuggled On Your Shoulder" (Carmen Lombardo, Joe Young)
3. "Are You Lonesome Tonight" (Lou Handman, Roy Turk)
4. "Wonderful One" (Ferde Grofé, Paul Whiteman, Theodora Morse)
5. "Street of Dreams" (Victor Young, Sam M. Lewis)
6. "Oh How I Miss You Tonight" (Joe Burke, Mark Fisher, Benny Davis)
7. "Life Is Just a Bowl of Cherries" (Ray Henderson, Buddy G. DeSylva, Lew Brown)
8. "All Alone" (Irving Berlin)
9. "Faded Summer Love" (Phil Baxter)
10. "Sleepy Lagoon" (Eric Coates, Jack Lawrence)
11. "If I Had My Life to Live Over" (Larry Vincent, Henry Tobias, Moe Jaffe)
12. "Let Me Call You Sweetheart" (Leo Friedman, Beth Slater Whitson)
13. "Both Sides Now" (bonus track)
14. "It's Magic" (bonus track)
15. "Sentimental Journey" (bonus track)
