= I Had the Craziest Dream =

1942 song by Harry Warren and Mack Gordon

"I Had The Craziest Dream"

Single by Harry James Orchestra, vocal Helen Forrest
- B-side: A Poem Set to Music
- Published: October 16, 1942 by Twentieth Century Music Corp.
- Released: October 10, 1942
- Recorded: July 23, 1942
- Studio: Los Angeles, CA
- Genre: swing
- Length: 3:23
- Label: Columbia 36659
- Composer: Harry Warren
- Lyricist: Mack Gordon

Harry James Orchestra, vocal Helen Forrest singles chronology
"Mister Five By Five" (1942)	"I Had The Craziest Dream" (1942)	"I've Heard That Song Before" (1942)

"I Had the Craziest Dream" is a popular song which was published in 1942. The music was written by Harry Warren, the lyrics by Mack Gordon.

== Background ==
The song was introduced by Harry James and his orchestra, with vocals by Helen Forrest, in the film Springtime in the Rockies (1942).

== Chart performance ==
James and Forrest recorded the song for Columbia Records (catalog No. 36659) on July 23, 1942 and their recording topped the Billboard charts during a 22-week stay. On the Harlem Hit Parade chart it peaked at number four.

== Other recordings ==
- 1942 Tony Martin recorded the song with Victor Young and His Orchestra for Decca Records (catalog No.4394A) on July 19, 1942.
- 1943 Vera Lynn - a single release.
- 1953 The Skylarks - their recording was a #28 hit,
- 1956 Helen Forrest - included in the album Miss Helen Forrest – Voice of the Name Bands.
- 1956 Lita Roza - for her album Love Is the Answer.
- 1957 Doris Day included the song on her album Hooray for Hollywood (1958).
- 1957 Perry Como - for his album We Get Letters.
- 1958 Nat King Cole - his recording was eventually included in a compilation album called The Unforgettable Nat Cole Sings The Great Songs! in 1966.
- 1965 Al Hirt released a version on his album, They're Playing Our Song.
- 1965 Doris Day - Doris Day's Sentimental Journey.
- 1967 Astrud Gilberto reached #31 on Billboard's Easy listening survey with her remake.

== In popular culture ==
The song was featured in the first Hit Kit, the U.S. Army's version of successful radio show Your Hit Parade.
