= The Doris Day Christmas Album =

Studio album by Doris Day
- Released: September 14, 1964
- Genre: Christmas music
- Label: Columbia

Doris Day chronology
Love Him (1963)	The Doris Day Christmas Album (1964)	With a Smile and a Song (1964)

The Doris Day Christmas Album is a 1964 album of Christmas songs performed by Doris Day. She performed with an orchestra conducted by Pete King. The album was released by Columbia Records on September 14, 1964, as a monophonic LP album (catalog number CL-2226) and a stereophonic LP album (catalog CS-9026). Critics from Billboard at the time noted that the songs "leave the listener with a slight tingle at the back of the neck."

Professional ratings
Review scores
Source	Rating
Allmusic	3/5 stars

== Track listing ==
1. "Silver Bells" (Jay Livingston, Ray Evans)
2. "I'll Be Home for Christmas" (Kim Gannon, Walter Kent, Buck Ram)
3. "Snowfall" (Claude Thornhill, Ray Charles)
4. "Toyland" (Victor Herbert, Glen MacDonough)
5. "Let It Snow! Let It Snow! Let It Snow!" (Sammy Cahn, Jule Styne)
6. "Be a Child at Christmas Time" (Martin Broones, William A. Luce)
7. "Winter Wonderland" (Felix Bernard, Richard B. Smith)
8. "The Christmas Song (Chestnuts Roasting on an Open Fire)" (Mel Tormé, Bob Wells)
9. "Christmas Present" (Sydney Robin)
10. "Have Yourself a Merry Little Christmas" (Hugh Martin, Ralph Blane)
11. "The Christmas Waltz" (Sammy Cahn, Jule Styne)
12. "White Christmas" (Irving Berlin)
