= Duet (Doris Day and André Previn album) =

Studio album by Doris Day/André Previn
- Released: February 22, 1962
- Recorded: 1961
- Genre: Jazz
- Length: 47:40
- Label: Columbia
- Producer: Irving Townsend

Doris Day chronology
I Have Dreamed (1961)	Duet (1962)	You'll Never Walk Alone (1962)

André Previn chronology
André Previn and J. J. Johnson (1962)	Duet (1962)	4 to Go! (1963)

Professional ratings
Review scores
Source	Rating
AllMusic	4.5/5 stars

Duet is a collaborative album by Doris Day and the André Previn trio, with songs arranged by Previn. The album was issued by Columbia Records (8552) in both monaural (catalog number CL-1752) and stereophonic (catalog number CS-8552) versions on February 22, 1962. Doris Day selected the songs.

== Track listing ==
1. "Close Your Eyes" (Bernice Petkere) – 3:14
2. "Fools Rush In (Where Angels Fear to Tread)" (Rube Bloom, Johnny Mercer) – 3:55
3. "Yes" (André Previn, Dory Langdon Previn) – 3:28
4. "Nobody's Heart" (Richard Rodgers, Lorenz Hart) – 3:57
5. "Remind Me" (Jerome Kern, Dorothy Fields) – 4:03
6. "Who Are We to Say (Obey Your Heart)" (Sigmund Romberg, Gus Kahn) – 3:04
7. "Daydreaming" (André Previn, Dory Langdon Previn) – 3:11
8. "Give Me Time" (Alec Wilder) – 3:31
9. "Control Yourself" (André Previn, Dory Langdon Previn) – 3:00
10. "Wait Till You See Him" (Richard Rodgers, Lorenz Hart) – 3:08
11. "My One and Only Love" (Guy Wood, Robert Mellin) – 3:43
12. "Falling in Love Again" (Sammy Lerner, Frederick Hollander) – 2:55

== Personnel ==
- Doris Day - vocals

The André Previn trio

- André Previn - piano
- Red Mitchell - double bass
- Frank Capp -drums
