= Doris Day's Sentimental Journey =

Studio album by Doris Day
- Released: July 12, 1965
- Recorded: November 11–21, 1964
- Genre: Jazz
- Label: Columbia
- Producer: Allen Stanton

Doris Day chronology
Latin for Lovers (1965)	Doris Day's Sentimental Journey (1965)	The Love Album (1994)

Professional ratings
Review scores
Source	Rating
AllMusic	4/5 stars
Record Mirror	4/5 stars

Doris Day's Sentimental Journey is a studio album by American singer Doris Day, released by Columbia Records on July 12, 1965 as a monophonic LP (catalog number CL-2360) and a stereophonic album (catalog number CS-9160). This was Day's final album for Columbia, and her last album of previously unissued material until 1994.

The album gets its title from Doris Day's first big hit, "Sentimental Journey," which she performed as a part of the band Les Brown and His Band of Renown in 1945, and was re-recorded for this album. Other tracks on the album consist mostly of pop standards, principally composed in the 1940s, approximately contemporaneously with the title track.

Liner notes on the album were written by George T. Simon who was the author of "The Feeling of Jazz". The album's tracks are performed by the Mort Garson Orchestra, which Mort Garson arranged and conducted. All of the album tracks are medium to slow tempo. The album was produced by Allen Stanton and the cover photography was by Frank Bez.

Though this was her last Columbia album, Day would continue to record for Columbia through mid-1967, issuing singles in 1966 and '67 and recording a number of tracks in 1967 for a projected new album. However, the planned album was shelved, and Day subsequently left Columbia (and essentially the recording industry) in 1967. Day's next release was not until 1994, and consisted of tracks from the shelved 1967 sessions.

Doris Day's Sentimental Journey was reissued on CD in 2001, combined with Latin for Lovers, which had been recorded earlier the same month.

== Track listing ==
1. "The More I See You" (Mack Gordon, Harry Warren) (recorded on September 21, 1964)
2. "At Last" (Mack Gordon, Harry Warren) (recorded on September 15, 1964)
3. "Come to Baby, Do!" (Inez James, Sidney Miller) (recorded on September 21, 1964)
4. "I Had the Craziest Dream" (Mack Gordon, Harry Warren)/"I Don't Want to Walk Without You" (Frank Loesser, Jule Styne) (recorded on September 21, 1964)
5. "I'll Never Smile Again" (Ruth Lowe) (recorded on September 15, 1964)
6. "I Remember You" (Victor Schertzinger, Johnny Mercer) (remake recorded on September 11, 1964)
7. "Serenade in Blue" (Harry Warren, Mack Gordon) (recorded on September 15, 1964)
8. "I'm Beginning to See the Light" (Duke Ellington, Don George, Johnny Hodges, Harry James) (recorded on September 21, 1964)
9. "It Could Happen to You" (Johnny Burke, Jimmy Van Heusen) (recorded on September 11, 1964)
10. "It's Been a Long, Long Time" (Jule Styne, Sammy Cahn) (recorded on September 15, 1964)
11. "Sentimental Journey" (Les Brown, Ben Homer, Bud Green) (remake recorded on September 11, 1964)
