= Fine and Dandy =

1930 popular song by Kay Swift and James Warburg

"Fine and Dandy" is a popular song from the 1930 Broadway musical of the same name.

== Composition ==
The music was written by Kay Swift, the lyrics by Paul James (a pseudonym of James Paul Warburg). The song was published in 1930.

The song was introduced in the musical of the same name in 1930, by the characters Joe Squibb and Nancy Ellis. It has since become a pop and jazz standard. A take-off using the same chord structure but a different melodic line was recorded by Woody Herman and called "Keen and Peachy".

== Recordings ==
- 1930 Arden-Ohman Orchestra (vocal by Frank Luther)
- 1930 the Dorsey Brothers Orchestra (vocal: Scrappy Lambert)
- 1950 Louis Armstrong and His All Stars - recorded on April 26, 1950 for Decca Records, catalog No. 27189.
- 1951 Doris Day - included in the album Lullaby of Broadway.
- 1955 Ralph Gari - included in the album Ralph Gari - EmArcy (MG-36019) https://archive.org/details/lp_ralph-gari_ralph-gari/disc1/01.06.+Fine+And+Dandy.mp3
- 1955 Anita O'Day - for her album, This Is Anita (1955)
- 1956 Bing Crosby recorded the song in 1956 for use on his radio show and it was subsequently included in the box set The Bing Crosby CBS Radio Recordings (1954-56) issued by Mosaic Records (catalog MD7-245) in 2009.
- 1957 Eydie Gormé - for her album Eydie Gormé.
- 1958 Jane Russell - included on her album Jane Russell.
- 1964 Barbra Streisand recorded it for her album, People.

== In popular culture ==
New York weatherman Tex Antoine used this as his theme music for many years.

The tune was used by Art Metrano (as the Great Metrano) in his act, which consisted of an inept magician performing inane tricks while chanting the refrain over and over.

The arcade game Blueprint uses this song as one of the level soundtracks, starting with the first level.

The Newhart Season 4 episode "Will the Real Dick Loudon Please Shut Up?" ends with a quick song and dance performance.
