= Young Man with a Horn (soundtrack) =

Soundtrack album by Doris Day
- Released: 1950
- Label: Columbia

Doris Day chronology
You're My Thrill (1949)	Young Man with a Horn (1950)	Tea for Two (1950)

Young Man with a Horn is an album that was released by Columbia Records in 1950. It features trumpeter Harry James and singer Doris Day performing songs initially recorded for the soundtrack of the film of the same name.

== Background and recording ==
The film Young Man with a Horn was loosely based on the life of Bix Beiderbecke. The soundtrack was played by trumpeter Harry James and his orchestra. Doris Day, who appears in the film, also sang on some of the album's tracks.

== Release and reception ==
Young Man with a Horn was released by Columbia Records in 1950 as the 10-inch LP CL-6106. According to Billboard, on February 3, 1950, Columbia held an advance screening of the film in Hollywood, along with playback of the new record, for Columbia distributors and dealers, hosted by James and his wife, Betty Grable. Billboard prognosticated, "Disks will get heavy exploitation thru the pic tie-up coincidental to the film's general release."

It was enormously successful commercially, spending 11 weeks at the No. 1 spot on Billboard's album charts, albeit non-consecutively. Day and James shared the 5 percent royalty for album sales.

== Track listing ==
(All tracks with Harry James, specified ones with Doris Day)

1. "I May Be Wrong (But I Think You're Wonderful)" (Harry Ruskin/Henry Sullivan) (Doris Day) - 3:01
2. "The Man I Love" (George Gershwin/Ira Gershwin) - 3:05
3. "The Very Thought Of You" (Ray Noble) (Doris Day) - 3:00
4. "Melancholy Rhapsody" (Sammy Cahn/Ray Heindorf) - 2:59
5. "Get Happy" (Harold Arlen/Ted Koehler) - 2:56
6. "Too Marvelous For Words" (Richard A. Whiting/Johnny Mercer) (Doris Day) 3:17
7. "Limehouse Blues" (Philip Braham/Douglas Furber)
8. "With a Song in My Heart" (Richard Rodgers/Lorenz Hart) (Doris Day) - 3:07

This album was expanded into a 12" version in 1954, Columbia CL 582, and currently available compact disc adding the following tracks:

1. "Would I Love You" (B. Russell/Harold Spina) (Doris Day with Harry James)
2. "Pretty Baby" (Gus Kahn/Van Alstyne/Jackson) (Doris Day without Harry James)
3. "I Only Have Eyes for You" (Al Dubin/Harry Warren) (Doris Day with Harry James)
4. "Lullaby of Broadway" (Al Dubin/Harry Warren) (Doris Day with Harry James)

== Credits ==
- Milton Ager Composer
- Harold Arlen Composer
- Ben Bernie Composer
- Philip Braham Composer
- Sammy Cahn Composer
- Hoagy Carmichael Dub Mixing
- Buddy Cole Piano
- James Cook Sax (Tenor)
- Corky Corcoran Sax (Tenor)
- Michael Curtiz Director
- Doris Day Vocals
- Howard Dietz Composer
- Kirk Douglas Dub Mixing, Trumpet
- Al Dubin Composer
- Ziggy Elmer Trombone
- J. Filmore Composer
- Douglas Furber Composer
- George Gershwin Composer
- Ira Gershwin Composer
- Franz Gruber Composer
- Lorenz Hart Composer
- Ray Heindorf Composer, Musical Direction
- Harry James Composer, Musical Direction, Trumpet
- Harry James & His Orchestra Performer, Primary Artist
- Gus Kahn Composer
- Ted Koehler Composer
- Ted McCord Photography
- Bruce McDonald Piano
- Johnny Mercer Composer
- Ray Noble Composer
- Maceo Pinkard Composer
- Bob Poland Sax (Baritone)
- Cole Porter Composer
- Tony Rizzi Guitar
- Richard Rodgers Composer
- Archie Rosate Clarinet
- Harry Ruskin Composer
- Babe Russin Sax (Tenor)
- Willie Smith Sax (Alto)
- Max Steiner Composer, Primary Artist
- Bob Stone Bass
- Henry Sullivan Composer
- Swift Composer
- Traditional Composer
- Egbert VanAlstyne Composer
- Jerry Wald Producer
- William Wallace Set Decoration
- Richard A. Whiting Composer
- Fred Witing Composer
- Stanley Wrightsman Piano
