= Love Me or Leave Me (Doris Day album) =

Soundtrack album by Doris Day
- Released: May 2, 1955
- Genre: Pop
- Label: Columbia

Doris Day chronology
Young at Heart (1954)	Love Me or Leave Me (1955)	Day Dreams (1955)

Love Me or Leave Me is a Doris Day album based on the soundtrack of the film of the same name. It was released monaurally by Columbia Records as catalog number CL-710 on May 2, 1955, in both LP as well as 45-EP formats and became her best-selling album to date, spending 28 weeks on the Billboard magazine album chart and reaching the #1 position. The best-selling album of Day's career, it ranks #16 of all albums produced between 1955 and 1996.

For the 1963 re-release of the picture and subsequent re-release of the record, instead of going back to the actual soundtrack recordings recorded in Hollywood specifically for the film and remixing for Stereo, producers took the original monaural New York session tapes and electronically synthesized a stereo signal. Thirty years later, producers finally went back to the original pre-recorded and post-recorded music stems and remixed for true stereo from sources that will lock to picture.

For the 1993 CD, in the opening track, the vocal starts out in one channel exclusively and then rapidly pans to the center where it remains throughout the rest of the stereo material on the album, which includes as a bonus, several of the original monaural New York session masters featuring different arrangements.

Like most so-called "soundtrack" albums of the period, the tracks featured hereon are in most cases not the exact performances recorded for the film, and which lock to picture. In this type of scenario, often arrangements will differ from the slight to the great compared to the film performance, and the key and/or tempo may be adjusted up or down accordingly as well for a greater impact on records.

Even though the audio portion of a great many film performances would have been recorded at Hollywood-based sessions as the technical requirements were many, the companion performances intended for release on records is often recorded in New York, where the best studios for records are often found and for which the technical requirements are considerably fewer than for film.

Professional ratings
Review scores
Source	Rating
Allmusic	4.5/5 stars

== Track listing (LP and cassette) ==
Recording dates listed in this section refer to the performances recorded stereophonically in Hollywood in mid-to-late 1954 and included in remixed stereo versions on the 40th anniversary CD listed below. With three exceptions indicated with *, these performances are not included on this release. The performances included here were recorded monaurally in New York in the late Winter and early Spring of 1955 from which an electronic stereo LP was engineered seven years later.

1. "It All Depends on You" (Ray Henderson, Buddy DeSylva, Lew Brown) (Recorded December 7, 1954) - 2:02
2. "You Made Me Love You (I Didn't Want to Do It)" (James V. Monaco, Joseph McCarthy) (Recorded November 18, 1954) - 2:29
3. "Stay on the Right Side, Sister" (Ted Koehler, Rube Bloom) (Recorded November 18, 1954) - 1:00
4. "Mean to Me" (Fred E. Ahlert, Roy Turk) (Recorded December 7, 1954) - 2:12
5. "Everybody Loves My Baby" (Jack Palmer, Spencer Williams) (Recorded November 18, 1954) - 1:11
6. "Sam, the Old Accordion Man" (Walter Donaldson) (Recorded December 7, 1954) - 2:06
7. "Shaking the Blues Away" (Irving Berlin) (recorded December 30, 1954) - 3:30
8. "Ten Cents a Dance" (Richard Rodgers, Lorenz Hart) (Recorded December 31, 1954) - 1:57
9. "I'll Never Stop Loving You" (Sammy Cahn, Nicholas Brodzsky) (Recorded December 1, 1954) - 1:55
10. "Never Look Back" (Chilton Price) (Recorded December 4, 1954) - 2:26
11. "At Sundown" (Donaldson) (Recorded December 7, 1954) - 1:31
12. "Love Me or Leave Me" (Donaldson, Gus Kahn) (Recorded December 7, 1954) - 2:14

== Track listing 40th anniversary CD and 2009 Download Album ==
Unlike in the LP and cassette editions, all tracks hereon save those marked with * are original soundtrack performances recorded in Hollywood in mid-to-late 1954. Songs marked with an * are performances recorded in New York in early 1955 and taken from the original monaural LP master. The 2009 download-only album adds the original Finale and Exit Music to the mix.

1. Overture
2. It All Depends on You
3. You Made Me Love You (I Didn't Want to Do It)
4. Stay on the Right Side, Sister
5. Everybody Loves My Baby (But My Baby Don't Love Nobody but Me)
6. Mean to Me
7. Sam, the Old Accordion Man
8. Shaking the Blues Away
9. MEDLEY:What Can I Say After I Say I'm Sorry - I Cried for You - My Blue Heaven - Ten Cents A Dance
10. I'll Never Stop Loving You
11. Never Look Back
12. At Sundown
13. Love Me or Leave Me
14. Finale
15. I'll Never Stop Loving You*
16. Ten Cents a Dance (Short Version)*
17. Love Me or Leave Me (Version 1)*
