= Cuttin' Capers (album) =

Studio album by Doris Day
- Released: March 9, 1959
- Genre: Pop
- Label: Columbia

Doris Day chronology
Hooray for Hollywood (1958)	Cuttin' Capers (1959)	Listen to Day (1960)

Professional ratings
Review scores
Source	Rating
Allmusic	2.5/5 stars

Cuttin' Capers is a Doris Day album issued by Columbia Records, as catalog # CL-1232 in monaural and CS-8078 in stereo, on March 9, 1959. Frank De Vol was the conductor and Hal Adams was the cover photographer.

The album was combined with Day's 1961 album, Bright and Shiny, on a compact disc, issued on November 13, 2001 by Collectables Records.

== Track listing ==
1. "Cuttin' Capers" (Joe Lubin) - 2:42
2. "Steppin' Out with My Baby" (Irving Berlin) - 2:01
3. "Makin' Whoopee!" (Walter Donaldson, Gus Kahn) - 3:38
4. "The Lady's in Love with You" (Burton Lane, Frank Loesser) - 2:20
5. "Why Don't We Do This More Often?" (Allie Wrubel, Charles Newman) - 3:00
6. "Let's Take a Walk Around the Block" (Harold Arlen, Ira Gershwin, Edgar Yipsel Harburg) - 2:40
7. "I'm Sitting on Top of the World" (Ray Henderson, Sam M. Lewis, Joe Young) - 2:20
8. "Get Out and Get Under the Moon" (Larry Shay, Charles Tobias, William Jerome) - 2:51
9. "Fit as a Fiddle (And Ready for Love)" (Arthur Freed, Al Goodhart, Al Hoffman)
10. "Me Too (Ho Ha! Ho Ha!)" (Al Sherman, Charles Tobias, Harry M. Woods)
11. "I Feel Like a Feather in the Breeze" (Mack Gordon, Harry Revel)
12. "Let's Fly Away" (Cole Porter)
