= By the Light of the Silvery Moon (album) =

Soundtrack album by Doris Day
- Released: March 13, 1953
- Label: Columbia

Doris Day chronology
I'll See You in My Dreams (1951)	By the Light of the Silvery Moon (1953)	Calamity Jane (1953)

By the Light of the Silvery Moon is a Doris Day album (released March 13, 1953) featuring songs from the movie of the same name. It was issued by Columbia Records as a 10" long-playing record, catalog number CL-6248 and as a 45 rpm EP set, B-334.

== Chart performance ==
The album debuted on Billboard magazine's Best-Selling Popular Record Albums chart in the issue dated April 25, 1953, peaking at No. 4 during a fourteen-week run on the chart.

== Compact Disc ==
The album was combined with Day's 1951 album, On Moonlight Bay, on a compact disc, issued on January 30, 2001, by Collectables Records.

== Track listing ==
1. "By the Light of the Silvery Moon" (Gus Edwards/Edward Madden) (with the Norman Luboff Choir)
2. "Your Eyes Have Told Me So" (Walter Blaufuss/Gustave Kahn/Egbert Van Alstyne)
3. "Just One Girl" (Lyn Udall/Karl Kennett) (with the Norman Luboff Choir)
4. "Ain't We Got Fun?" (Richard A. Whiting/Raymond B. Egan/Gus Kahn) (with the Norman Luboff Choir)
5. "If You Were the Only Girl" (Nat D. Ayer/Clifford Grey)
6. "Be My Little Baby Bumble Bee" (Henry I. Marshall/Stanley Murphy) (with the Norman Luboff Choir)
7. "I'll Forget You" (Ernest Ball/Annelu Burns)
8. "King Chanticleer" (Nat D. Ayer/Seymour Brown) (with the Norman Luboff Choir)

== Charts ==
Chart (1953)	Peak position
US Billboard Best-Selling Pop Albums	4
