= Canadian Capers =

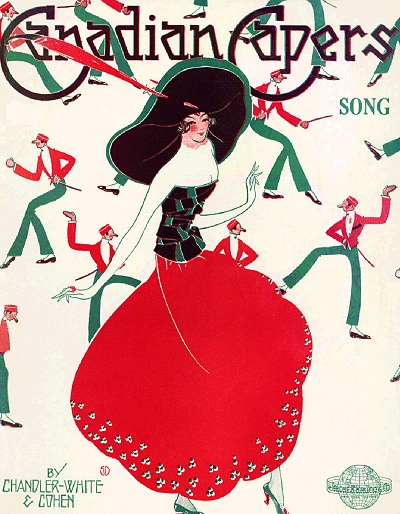
Sheet music cover, 1921

"Canadian Capers" is a popular tune, written by Gus Chandler, Bert White, and Henry Cohen with words by Earl Burtnett in 1915. The tune has been recorded by many people over the years. A recording by Paul Whiteman was very popular in 1921.

An updated set of lyrics with the title "Cuttin' Capers" were written in 1949 by Ralph Blane and Harry Warren, for the Doris Day musical film My Dream Is Yours. Doris Day also made a commercial recording of the song for Columbia Records in June 1949 and this reached No. 15 in the Billboard charts.

Janet Seidel included the song on her album Doris & Me (2001).
