= Love Him (album) =

Studio album by Doris Day
- Released: December 16, 1963
- Recorded: November–December, 1963
- Genre: Pop
- Label: Columbia; CL 2131; CS 8931
- Producer: Terry Melcher

Doris Day chronology
Annie Get Your Gun (1963)	Love Him (1963)	The Doris Day Christmas Album (1964)

Love Him was a Doris Day album recorded in October and November, 1963 and released by Columbia Records on December 16, 1963. It was produced by Day's son Terry Melcher and issued as both a monophonic LP (catalog number CL-2131) and a stereophonic LP (catalog number CS-8931). The album was arranged and conducted by Tommy Oliver, and it was her first LP in over a year.

== Chart performance ==
The album debuted on Billboard magazine's Top LP's chart in the issue dated March 14, 1964, peaking at No. 102 during an eight-week run on the chart. It debuted on Cashbox magazine's Top 100 Albums chart in the issue dated February 15, 1964, peaking at No. 32 during a twelve-week run on the chart. On the magazine's Top 50 Stereo chart, the album peaked at a higher No. 24 during its shorter six-week run on the chart.

== Reception ==
The initial Cashbox magazine review said that "Doris Day directs her attention at a tender, sentimental program of romantic standards and newies on this new release."

William Ruhlmann on AllMusic stated that Love Him represented a whole new approach, he also said that her son "seemed to want to demonstrate that Day could sing a broader range of material than Columbia had been giving her, and she responded by throwing herself into performances of songs that had greater depth than those she usually sang."

== Compact disc ==
The album was combined with Day's 1960 album, Show Time, on a compact disc, issued on November 14, 2000 by Collectables Records.

== Track listing ==
Track listing for Love Him:
No.	Title	Writer(s)	Length
1.	"More (Theme from the film Mondo Cane)"	Riz Ortolani, Nino Oliviero, Norman Newell	2:45
2.	"Can't Help Falling in Love"	George David Weiss, Hugo Peretti, Luigi Creatore	2:38
3.	"Since I Fell for You"	Buddy Johnson	4:34
4.	"Losing You"	Carl Sigman, Jean Renard	3:46
5.	"(Now & Then There's) A Fool Such as I"	Bill Trader	2:55
6.	"As Long as He Needs Me (from the Broadway musical production Oliver!)"	Lionel Bart	4:02
7.	"Night Life"	Willie Nelson, Paul Buskirk, Walt Breeland	4:34
8.	"Funny"	Larry Holofcener, Edward N. Scott	2:45
9.	"Softly, as I Leave You"	Hal Shaper, Antonio De Vita, Giorgio Calabrese	3:04
10.	"Lollipops and Roses"	Tony Velona	2:50
11.	"Love Him"	Barry Mann, Cynthia Weil	2:14

== Charts ==
Chart peaks for Love Him
Chart (1964)	Peak position
US Billboard Top LPs	102
US Cashbox Top 100 Albums	32
US Cashbox Top 50 Stereo	24
