= George Siravo =

American musician (1916–2000)

George Siravo (October 2, 1916, Staten Island, New York – February 28, 2000, Medford, Oregon) was an American composer, arranger, conductor, saxophonist, and clarinetist.

He began his career playing reeds with the Cliquot Club Eskimos and later was a member of the orchestras of led by Glenn Miller, Gene Krupa, Charlie Barnet, and Jan Savitt. He played alto saxophone in the first Glenn Miller orchestra, appearing on the 1937 recording "Community Swing".

In the 1940s, he became a staff arranger for Columbia Records and worked with Frank Sinatra, Doris Day, Tony Bennett, Connie Boswell, Vic Damone, and Artie Shaw.

He orchestrated two of Frank Sinatra's 1950s albums: Sing and Dance with Frank Sinatra and Songs for Young Lovers with Nelson Riddle. He arranged Doris Day's "It's Magic" and Tony Bennett's "Who Can I Turn To?" He also recorded instrumental albums under his own name, such as Seductive Strings by Siravo, which featured trumpeter Doc Severinsen. He orchestrated the 1947 Universal International film Something in the Wind starring Deanna Durbin and Donald O'Connor.

== Sources ==
- Flower, John (1972). Moonlight Serenade: a bio-discography of the Glenn Miller Civilian Band. New Rochelle, NY: Arlington House. ISBN 0-87000-161-2.
- Miller, Glenn (1943). Glenn Miller's Method for Orchestral Arranging. New York: Mutual Music Society. ASIN: B0007DMEDQ
- Simon, George Thomas (1980). Glenn Miller and His Orchestra. New York: Da Capo paperback. ISBN 0-306-80129-9.
- Simon, George Thomas (1971). Simon Says. New York: Galahad. ISBN 0-88365-001-0.
- Schuller, Gunther (1991). The Swing Era: The Development of Jazz, 1930–1945, Vol. 2. New York: Oxford University Press. ISBN 0-19-507140-9.
- Kernfeld, Barry Dean (2002). The New Grove Dictionary of Jazz. Second edition. Three volumes. London: Macmillan Publishers.
