= Ned Washington =

American lyricist (1901–1976)

Background information
- Born: Edward Michael Washington; August 15, 1901; Scranton, Pennsylvania, U.S.
- Died: December 20, 1976 (aged 75) Beverly Hills, California, U.S.
- Occupation: Lyricist

Ned Washington (born Edward Michael Washington, August 15, 1901 – December 20, 1976) was an American lyricist born in Scranton, Pennsylvania.

== Life and career ==
Washington was nominated for 11 Academy Awards from 1940 to 1962. He won the Best Original Song award twice, in 1940 for "When You Wish Upon a Star" in Pinocchio and in 1952 for "High Noon (Do Not Forsake Me, Oh My Darlin')" in High Noon.

Washington had his roots in vaudeville as a master of ceremonies. Having started his songwriting career with Earl Carroll's Vanities on Broadway in the late 1920s, he joined the ASCAP in 1930. In 1934, he was signed by MGM and relocated to Hollywood, eventually writing full scores for feature films. During the 1940s, he worked for a number of studios, including Paramount, Warner Bros., Disney, and Republic.

During these tenures, he collaborated with many of the great composers of the era, including Hoagy Carmichael, Victor Young, Max Steiner, and Dimitri Tiomkin.

With Leigh Harline, he contributed most of the melodic songs that distinguished the Pinocchio soundtrack, including "When You Wish Upon a Star".

He also served as a director of the ASCAP from 1957 until 1976, the year he died of a heart ailment.

Washington is a member of the Songwriters Hall of Fame. His grave is located in Culver City's Holy Cross Cemetery. He was posthumously honored as a Disney Legend, in 2001.

== Songs ==
Some of Washington's songwriting credits include:

- Theme for the film 5 Card Stud (music by Maurice Jarre, 1968) was sung in the movie by Dean Martin.
- "Town Without Pity" (music by Dimitri Tiomkin, 1961), was sung in the movie of the same name by Gene Pitney.
- "Rawhide" (music by Dimitri Tiomkin, 1958) was sung in the TV show by Frankie Laine.
- "Night Passage" (music by Dimitri Tiomkin), two songs, "Follow the River" and "You Can't Get Far Without a Railroad" both were sung in the epoymous film by James Stewart.
- "The 3:10 to Yuma" (music by George Duning, 1957) was sung in the movie by Frankie Laine.
- "Wild Is the Wind" (music by Dimitri Tiomkin, 1956) was sung in the movie by Johnny Mathis.
- "Gunfight at the O.K. Corral" (music by Dimitri Tiomkin, 1956) was sung in the movie by Frankie Laine.
- "Wichita", music by Hans J. Salter
- "The High and the Mighty" (music by Dimitri Tiomkin, 1954) (Deleted from the final "cut" of the movie, but nominated anyway for the Best Song at the 27th Academy Awards; also deleted from the recent "restoration" by Batjac)
- Lyrics from the musical numbers in the film Let's Do It Again, 1953.
- "Take the High Ground!", (music by Dimitri Tiomkin, 1953)
- "Return to Paradise" from the film Return to Paradise, (music by Dimitri Tiomkin), 1953
- "High Noon (Do Not Forsake Me, Oh My Darlin')" in the film High Noon, sung by Tex Ritter. (music by Dimitri Tiomkin) 1952
- "My Foolish Heart" (music by Victor Young, 1950)
- "Mad About You", from the film Gun Crazy (music by Victor Young, 1950)
- "Don't Call It Love", from the film I Walk Alone, with Allie Wrubel, music by Victor Young, 1948
- "On Green Dolphin Street" (music by Bronislau Kaper, 1947)
- "Stella by Starlight" (music by Victor Young), 1944), recorded by Ella Fitzgerald on her Verve album Clap Hands, Here Comes Charlie!, also covered by Thelonious Monk, Miles Davis, and Chet Baker
- "Baby Mine", "Pink Elephants on Parade", and "When I See an Elephant Fly" for Dumbo (music by Frank Churchill and Oliver Wallace, 1941), the first sung in the movie by Betty Noyes (uncredited); nominated for an Academy Award for Best Song at the 14th Academy Awards and the second by the character Dandy (Jim) Crow, voiced by Cliff Edwards (uncredited), also known as "Ukulele Ike".
- "When You Wish Upon a Star" for Pinocchio (music by Leigh Harline, 1940), sung in the movie by the character Jiminy Cricket, voiced by Cliff Edwards, also known as "Ukulele Ike", won the Academy Award for Best Song at the 13th Academy Awards.
- "Give a Little Whistle", from the film Pinocchio (music by Leigh Harline, 1940)
- "The Nearness of You" (with Hoagy Carmichael, 1938) written for Gladys Swarthout for the film Romance in the Dark
- "Cosi Cosa" (with Bronislaw Kaper & Walter Jurmann, 1935) sung by Allan Jones in the film A Night at the Opera.
- "A Hundred Years from Today", (music by Victor Young, 1933)
- "Smoke Rings" (music by H. Eugene Gifford, 1932)
- "I'm Gettin' Sentimental Over You" (music by George Bassman, 1932), used by Tommy Dorsey as his theme song
- "I Don't Stand a Ghost of a Chance with You" (music by Victor Young, 1932), recorded by Ella Fitzgerald on her Pablo release Digital III at Montreux.
- "Singin' in the Bathtub" (with Herb Magidson; music by Michael H. Cleary, 1929)
