= Larry Shay =

American songwriter (1897–1988)

Larry Shay (né Lawrence Fredrick Schaetzlein; 10 August 1897 Chicago – 22 February 1988 Newport Beach, California) was an American songwriter.

Shay was born in Chicago, Illinois. While still young, he studied the piano at the Bush Conservatory of Music in Chicago. He eventually moved to New York City to become a songwriter. His first composition was "Do You, Don't You, Will You, Won't You," published in 1923. In 1925 he joined ASCAP (American Society of Composers, Authors and Publishers), and remained a member for 63 years. In 1929 he co-authored his most famous song, "When You're Smiling" (As with many other of his songs, this was a collaboration with Joe Goodwin and Mark Fisher; see Shay, Fisher, and Goodwin).

In the 1930s, Metro-Goldwyn-Mayer hired him to become their music director and Shay and his wife Doris moved from New York to Hollywood. In that capacity, he hired Bing Crosby, who was paid $50 a day by MGM for his first picture.

He published over 300 songs in his life. He died in Newport Beach, California. He had a daughter.
