= "By" Dunham =

American film producer and songwriter

- Born: William Donaldson Dunham; May 2, 1910; New York City, U.S.
- Died: April 12, 2001 (aged 90); Encinitas, California, U.S.
- Occupations: Songwriter; film producer
- Years active: 1960s

William D. "By" Dunham (May 2, 1910 – April 12, 2001) was an American songwriter and film producer.

Born William Donaldson Dunham in New York City, Dunham wrote songs for the films of many major stars, including John Wayne ("McLintock!"), Randolph Scott ("Seven Men From Now"), and three Bob Hope films: Boy, Did I Get a Wrong Number!, I'll Take Sweden, and Alias Jesse James. He also wrote the lyrics to the theme song for the Flipper television series, and for the 1995 revival series The New Adventures of Flipper.

His other films included The Young Swingers, Surf Party, and Wild on the Beach, the last of which he also produced.

Dunham died in Encinitas, California.
