= Presenting Lily Mars =

1943 film by Norman Taurog

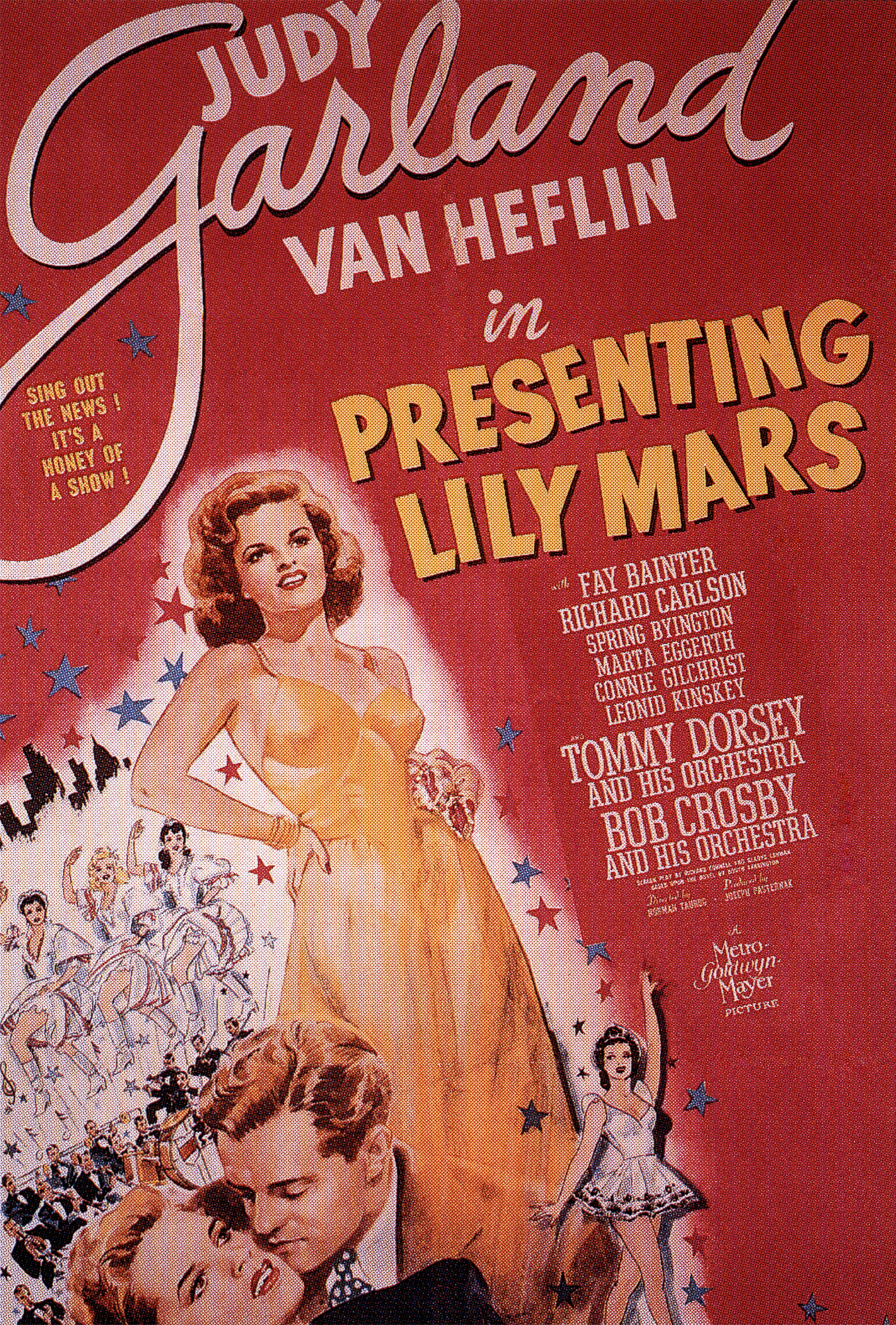
- Theatrical release poster
- Directed by: Norman Taurog
- Written by: Jack Mintz (comedy construction)
- Screenplay by: Richard Connell; Gladys Lehman
- Based on: Presenting Lily Mars; 1933 novel by Booth Tarkington
- Produced by: Joe Pasternak
- Starring: Judy Garland; Van Heflin
- Cinematography: Joseph Ruttenberg
- Edited by: Albert Akst
- Music by: George Stoll
- Production company: Metro-Goldwyn-Mayer
- Distributed by: Loew's Inc.
- Release date: April 29, 1943
- Running time: 104 minutes
- Country: United States
- Language: English
- Budget: $1,045,000
- Box office: $3,255,000

Presenting Lily Mars is a 1943 American musical comedy film directed by Norman Taurog, produced by Joe Pasternak, starring Judy Garland and Van Heflin, and based on the 1933 novel by Booth Tarkington. The film is often cited as Garland's first film playing an adult role. However, the issue is complicated by the delay in this film's release caused by reshooting the finale, and Garland's brutal work schedule—she was filming Girl Crazy and For Me and My Gal at the same time. Also, in Little Nellie Kelly, released in 1940, she plays her character's mother, dying in childbirth. Tommy Dorsey and Bob Crosby appear with their orchestras.

== Plot ==
Lily Mars is a 19-year-old girl from small town Indiana, who aspires to become an actress on Broadway. She visits her next-door neighbor Mrs. Mimi Thornway hoping her son John, who is a Broadway producer, will give her a part in his latest touring production. However, John refuses to meet with her, and as Lily listens on, he calls her an amateur. Lily then steals John's play Let Me Dream and phones him to arrive at her house to retrieve it. There, Lily performs a rendition of Lady Macbeth's soliloquy. Unmoved by Lily's performance, John harshly criticizes it before she returns his play.

Lily antagonizes John once more outside of Mrs. Thornway's window, as playwright Owen Vail and Russian actress Isobel Rebay look on. John, in frustration, gives Lily free tickets to his play and promises to spank her if he sees her again. After the play, Owen invites Lily to the afterparty, where John chases Lily around until she performs an impromptu swing number. Lily peacefully leaves and returns to her bedroom in tears. In response, Lily's mother encourages her to leave for New York.

In New York, Lily sneaks into a Broadway theater and watches a rehearsal for John's play. Lily falls asleep during the rehearsals, and she is discovered by Frankie, a charwoman who too dreamed of becoming an actress. Frankie encourages Lily to pursue her dreams. The next day, during rehearsals, Lily tries dancing with the show's chorus line until she faints from hunger. Moved by Lily's determination, John takes her to lunch and allows her into the chorus line. He also arranges her living accommodation at a boardinghouse.

Meanwhile, Isobel complains about the play's third act and senses John's growing affection towards Lily. As Owen and John rewrite the act one night, Lily arrives in John's office and suggests her own ending. John and Owen incorporate Lily's revisions into the third act. Despite Owen's warning that he is growing too close to Lily, nevertheless, John casts her as a chambermaid.

Two weeks later, John and Lily attend a nightclub where Lily performs a number on the club's stage. There, she imitates Isobel's accent, as Isobel recoils in embarrassment and leaves the club. The next day, Isobel quits the play and John cast Lily as her replacement, as he has fallen in love with her. As Lily rehearses her part, she phones her family and invites them to the opening night. However, John decides Lily is miscast and rehires Isobel.

Lily leaves the theater, feeling discouraged and returns to her apartment where her family has arrived. Motivated by her family's encouragement, Lily returns to the theater and makes her debut performance. John thanks Lily for returning, and writes his next show When There's Music for her. Lily, now a star in her own right, performs a musical number with Tommy Dorsey and his orchestra.

== Cast ==
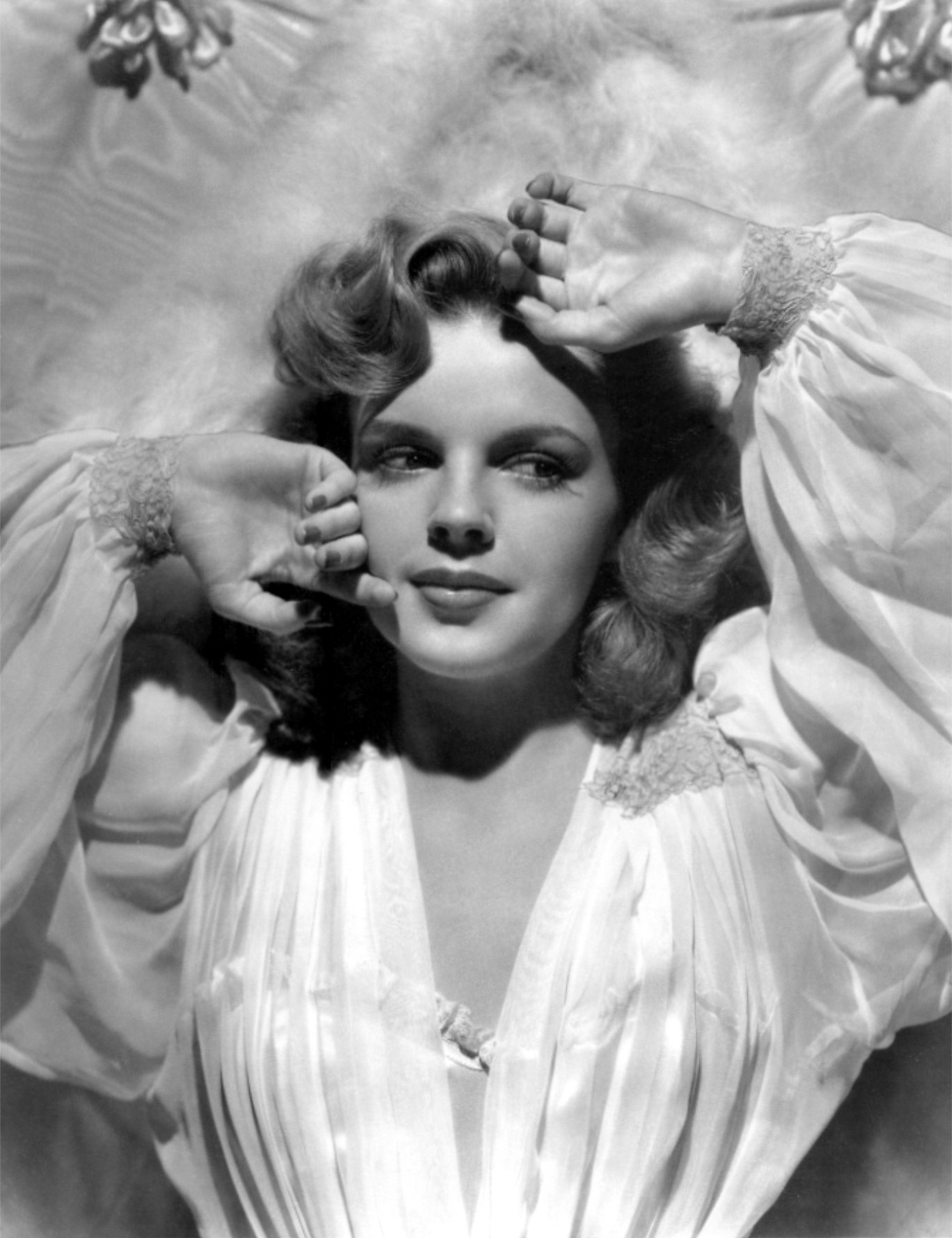
Garland was given the Hollywood "glamor treatment" for this role, as seen in this promotional image for the film.

- Judy Garland as Lily Mars
- Van Heflin as John Thornway
- Fay Bainter as Mrs. Thornway
- Richard Carlson as Owen Vail
- Spring Byington as Mrs. Flora Mars
- Marta Eggerth as Isobel Rekay
- Connie Gilchrist as Frankie
- Leonid Kinskey as Leo
- Patricia Barker as Poppy
- Janet Chapman as Violet
- Annabelle Logan as Rosie
- Douglas Croft as Davey
- Ray McDonald as Charlie Potter
- Lew Payton as Thornway's Butler
- Charles Walters as Lily's Dance Partner in Finale (uncredited)
- Lillian Yarbo as Rosa, Isobel's maid (uncredited))

== Soundtrack ==
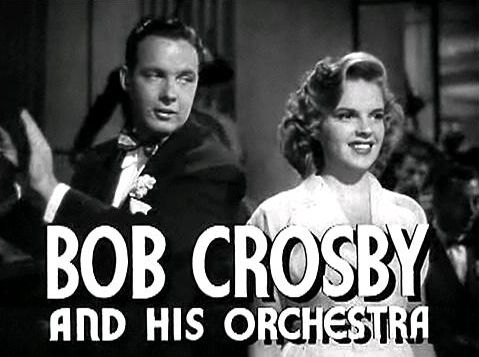
Bob Crosby and Garland in trailer for this film

The soundtrack includes:

- "Every Little Movement (Has a Meaning All Its Own)" (music by Karl Hoschna, lyrics by Otto Harbach, 1910)
- "When I Look At You" (music by Paul Francis Webster, lyrics by Walter Jurmann, 1943)
- "Tom, Tom The Piper's Son" (music by Burton Lane, lyrics by Yip Harburg, 1943)
- "Three O'Clock in the Morning" (music by Julián Robledo, lyrics by Theodora Morse, 1921)
- "Broadway Rhythm" (music by Nacio Herb Brown, lyrics by Arthur Freed, 1935), featuring Tommy Dorsey and His Orchestra.

The finale, "Where There's Music", originally included parts of "St. Louis Blues", "In the Shade of the Old Apple Tree", and "It's a Long Way to Tipperary", which were deleted from the final version.

== Reception ==
According to MGM records the film earned $2,216,000 in the US and Canada and $1,039,000 elsewhere, resulting in a profit of $1,211,000.

A review in The New York Times praised Judy Garland's "blithe talents" but concluded: "For all its sweetness, Presenting Lily Mars is uninviting fare; it is glorified monotony. Perhaps M-G-M should let Miss Garland grow up and stay that way."
