= The Girl of My Dreams (film) =

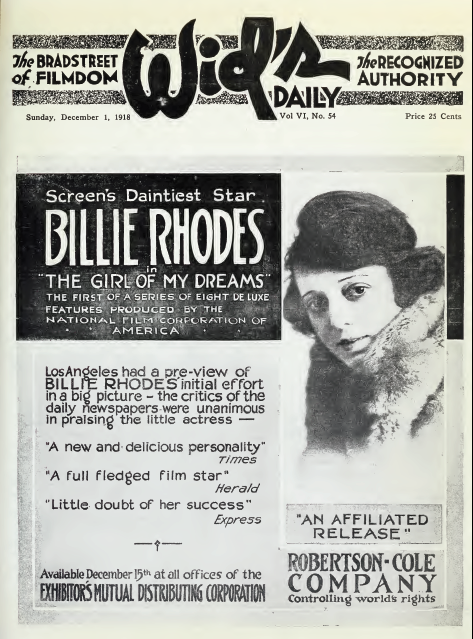
- Directed by: Louis Chaudet (assistant:Scott Beal)
- Based on: The Girl of My Dreams book by Wilbur Daniels, Otto Hauerbach (Otto Harbach), music by Karl L. Hoschna c.1911
- Produced by: National Film Corporation of America
- Starring: Billie Rhodes
- Cinematography: Walter L. Griffin
- Music by: George W. Benyon
- Distributed by: Exhibitors Mutual Distributing Company; Robertson-Cole Corporation
- Release date: December 15, 1918
- Running time: 6 reels
- Country: USA
- Language: Silent..English titles

The Girl of My Dreams is a lost 1918 American silent romance film directed by Louis Chaudet and starring Billie Rhodes. It was adapted from the 1911 Broadway musical The Girl of My Dreams.

== Cast ==
- Billie Rhodes - The Weed
- Jack McDonald - George Bassett
- Lamar Johnstone - Kenneth Stewart (*as Lamar Johnston)
- Golda Madden - Madelin Stewart
- Jane Keckley - Ma Williams
- Frank MacQuarrie - Pa Williams
- Ben Suslow - Jed Williams (*as Benjamin Suslow)
- Leo Pierson - Ralph Long
