= She Didn't Say Yes =

1931 song

Song
- Published: 1931 by T.B. Harms Company
- Songwriters: Jerome Kern and Otto Harbach

"She Didn't Say Yes" is a 1931 song composed by Jerome Kern, with lyrics by Otto Harbach.

It was written for the show The Cat and the Fiddle (1931) and introduced by Bettina Hall. A popular recording in 1932 was by Leo Reisman & His Orchestra (vocal by Frank Luther). Other 1931/1932 recordings were by Chick Bullock, Smith Ballew and Ben Selvin.

The Cat and the Fiddle was filmed in 1934 and "She Didn't Say Yes" was performed in the film by Jeanette MacDonald.

== Other notable recordings ==
- Ella Fitzgerald - Ella Fitzgerald Sings the Jerome Kern Songbook (1963)
- Steve Lawrence & Eydie Gormé - for their album Cozy (1961).
- Peggy Lee - recorded September 23, 1946, for Capitol Records.
- Margaret Whiting - Margaret Whiting Sings the Jerome Kern Songbook (1960)
- Harold Macmillan - In 1962, the British prime minister quoted several lines from the song in his conference speech, mocking the supposed indecisiveness of a political opponent. The satirical magazine Private Eye took a recording of his words, put a backing track to it, and published it as a disc.
- Al Bowlly
