= Leila McIntyre =

American actress (1882–1953)

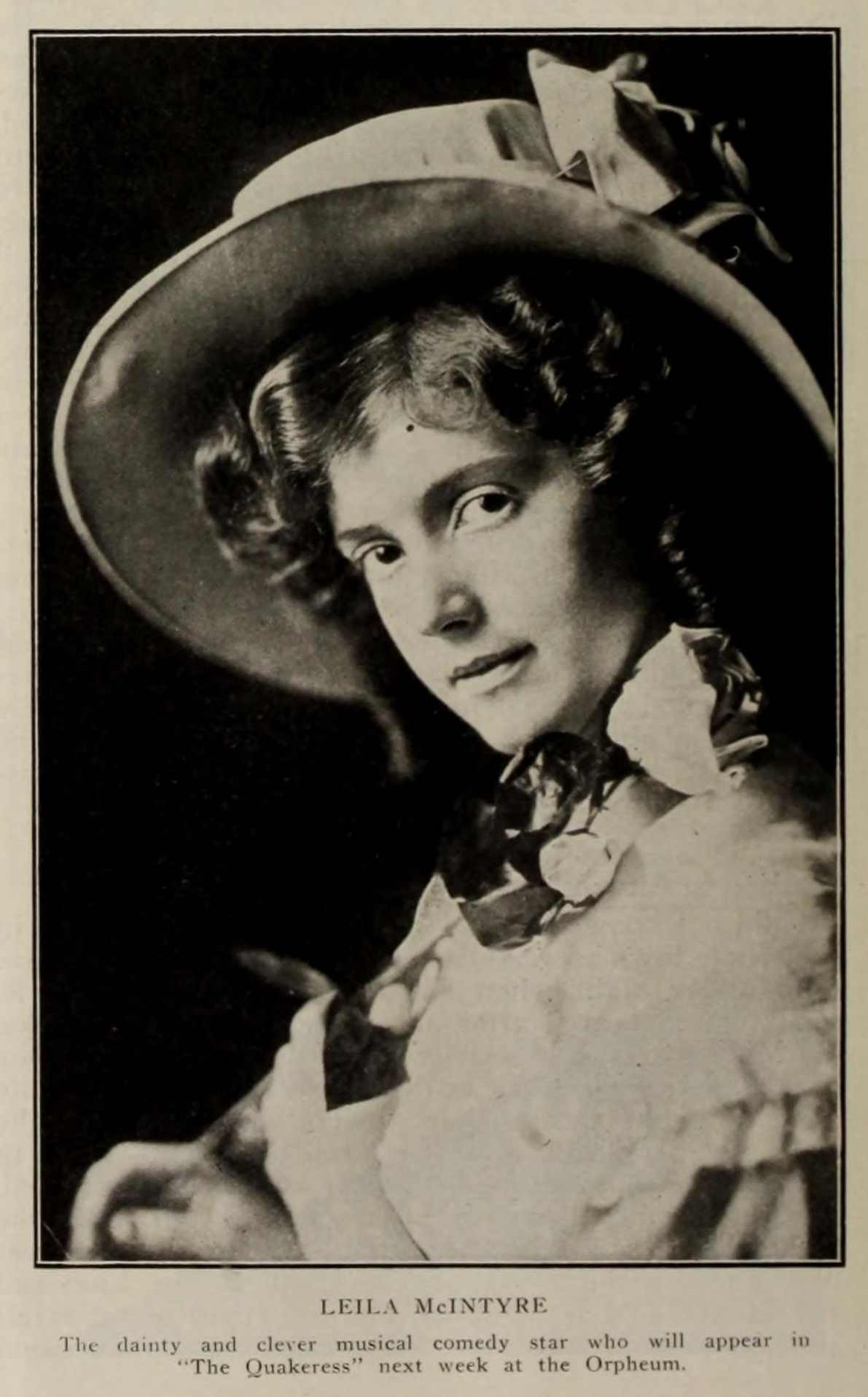
- McIntyre in Town Talk, August 28, 1909
- Born: December 20, 1882; Vermont, U.S.
- Died: January 9, 1953 (aged 70); Los Angeles, California, U.S.
- Occupation: Actress
- Years active: 1903–1946
- Spouse: John Hyams (m. 1904; died 1940)
- Children: Leila Hyams

Leila McIntyre (December 20, 1882 – January 9, 1953) was an American actress and vaudeville performer.

== Early life ==
Leila McIntyre was from Vermont, She was on stage from childhood.

== Career ==
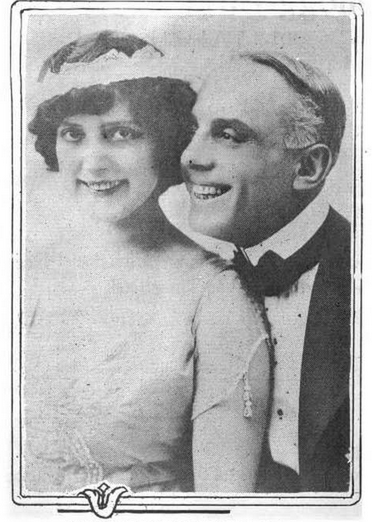
Leila McIntyre and John Hyams, from a 1917 publication.

Leila McIntyre was a vaudeville performer, first as half of Linton & McIntyre, "The Chattering Chums", and finding fame as part of the Hyams & McIntyre comedy team with her husband, John Hyams. She appeared in several Broadway productions, including Mother Goose (1903), A Little of Everything (1904), York State Folks (1905), The Girl of My Dreams (1911) and The Dancing Duchess (1914). In a review of The Girl of My Dreams, the New York Times noted that McIntyre had "a pretty saucer-eyed innocent stare and quavering treble" suited to her ingenue role.

Leila McIntyre appeared in almost forty films, usually in small roles, including twice as Mary Todd Lincoln, in The Plainsman (1936) and in The Prisoner of Shark Island (1936). She was also seen in Hurricane (1929), On the Level (1930), Marriage on Approval (1933), Her Secret (1933), Private Worlds (1935), Murder in the Fleet, Mr. Cinderella (1936), Pick a Star (1937), The Housekeeper's Daughter (1939) and Captain Eddie (1945). Her last film role was in The Hoodlum Saint (1946).

== Personal life ==
Leila McIntyre married fellow actor John Hyams, in 1904. Their daughter, Leila Hyams (1905–1977), also became an actress. Leila McIntyre was widowed in 1940. She died in 1953, aged 70 years, in Los Angeles, California.

== Filmography ==
Year	Title	Role	Notes
1929	Hurricane	Mrs. Stevens	
1930	On the Level	Mom Whalen	
1931	City Lights	Flower Shop Assistant	Uncredited
1932	Forbidden		Uncredited
1933	Footlight Parade	Mother in 'Honeymoon Hotel'	Uncredited
1933	Marriage on Approval	Mary MacDonald	
1933	Her Secret	Dean of Women	
1934	Dr. Monica	Elizabeth – Monica's Maid	Uncredited
1935	A Night at the Ritz	Banker's Wife	Uncredited
1935	Private Worlds	Mrs. Marley	
1935	Murder in the Fleet	Mrs. Ambrose Justin	Uncredited
1935	The Virginia Judge	Mrs. Stuart	
1935	Coronado	Hotel Guest	Uncredited
1936	Dangerous Waters	Mrs. Brunch	Uncredited
1936	The Prisoner of Shark Island	Mary Todd Lincoln	
1936	We Went to College	Mrs. Tomlin	Uncredited
1936	Mr. Cinderella	Mrs. Wilberforce	
1936	The Plainsman	Mary Todd Lincoln	Uncredited
1937	Pick a Star	Mrs. McGregor	
1939	Zenobia	Mrs. Langhorn	Uncredited
1939	The Women	Woman with Bundles	Uncredited
1939	The Housekeeper's Daughter	Mrs. Randall	
1940	Framed	Elderly Woman	Uncredited
1940	Women Without Names	Juror	Uncredited
1940	Third Finger, Left Hand	Mrs. Thompson	Uncredited
1941	Accent on Love	Elderly Woman	Uncredited
1941	Private Nurse	Woman in Flower Shop	Uncredited
1942	Maisie Gets Her Man	Mrs. Dillon	Uncredited
1942	Tennessee Johnson	Minor Role	Uncredited
1943	Crash Dive	Senator's Wife	Uncredited
1943	Wintertime	Bridge Player	Uncredited
1945	A Guy, a Gal and a Pal	Jimmy's Mother	Uncredited
1945	Nob Hill	Minor Role	Uncredited
1945	Captain Eddie	Mrs. Foley	
1945	Fallen Angel	Bank Clerk	Uncredited
1946	The Hoodlum Saint	Mrs. Ryan	Uncredited, (final film role)
