= G. Pat Collins =

American actor

- Born: George Percy Collins; December 16, 1895; Brooklyn, New York, U.S.
- Died: August 5, 1959 (aged 63); Los Angeles, California, U.S.
- Occupation: Actor
- Years active: 1922–1958
- Spouse: Billie Rhodes (1927–1959; his death)

G. Pat Collins, also known as George Pat Collins or Pat Collins (born George Percy Collins; December 16, 1895 – August 5, 1959) was an American actor of the stage and screen.

== Biography ==
Collins was born in Brooklyn, New York in 1895.

After serving in the United States Army during World War I, Collins began his acting career in the New York theater scene. His first Broadway appearance was in the 1922 play, The Bootleggers, a short-lived comedy which was produced at the 39th Street Theatre in November and December of that year. He would appear in ten plays between 1922 and 1938.

His film career would last slightly longer, mostly as a character actor or in smaller roles, from 1928 through 1958, during which time he appeared in over 100 films. Collins often played earnest roles like police or military officers. His first film was a silent picture, the 1928 film, The Racket, which stars Louis Wolheim, and in which Collins had a featured role. It would be the only silent film he would make. Two years later, in 1930, Collins would have a featured role in another film with Wolheim, the classic All Quiet on the Western Front.

In 1922 he would marry the silent film actress, Billie Rhodes, and the two would remain married until Collins death. After finishing work on They Died With Their Boots On, in which he had a small role, Collins took a break from the film industry, and at the age of 47 re-enlisted in the armed services for the duration of World War II. He would return to films with a small role in 1947's Easy Come, Easy Go. Collins would continue to act in films through 1958, mostly in supporting and small roles. His final film would be in the Glenn Ford 1958 vehicle, The Sheepman.

He died on August 5, 1959, in Los Angeles, aged 63.

== Filmography ==
(Per AFI database)

- The Racket (1928) as Patrolman Johnson
- Half Marriage (1929) as Detective Bob Mulhall (uncredited)
- All Quiet on the Western Front (1930) as Bertinck
- Be Yourself! (1930) as McCloskey
- Big Money (1930) as Smiley
- Manslaughter (1930) as John Drummond
- Only Saps Work (1930) as Rafferty
- The Vice Squad (1931) as Pete - Detective
- The Lawyer's Secret (1931) as Motorcycle Officer (uncredited)
- A Woman of Experience (1931) as Submarine Captain Franz (uncredited)
- No Limit (1931) as Charlie
- Wicked (1931) as Cop #2
- I Am a Fugitive from a Chain Gang (1932) as Wilson (uncredited)
- Central Park (1932) as Gangster Spud (uncredited)
- 20,000 Years in Sing Sing (1932) as Mike - Death Row Convict (uncredited)
- Hold 'Em Jail (1932) as Whitey
- Girl Missing (1933) as Crawford
- Picture Snatcher (1933) as Hennessy
- The Mayor of Hell (1933) as Brandon
- Heroes for Sale (1933) as Leader of Agitators
- Parachute Jumper (1933) as om Crowley (uncredited)
- The Silk Express (1933) as Train Guard Harry Burns
- Fog (1933) as Mullaney
- He Was Her Man (1934)
- Manhattan Melodrama (1934) as Killer in Prison (uncredited)
- A Very Honorable Guy (1934) as Red Hendrickson
- The Big Shakedown (1934) as Gyp
- Keep 'Em Rolling (1934) as Sergeant Tom Randall
- Friends of Mr. Sweeney (1934) as Soda Jerk (uncredited)
- The Personality Kid (1934) as Ed
- The Crime Doctor (1934) as Walters
- The Girl from Missouri (1934)
- The Captain Hates the Sea (1934) as Donlin
- West of the Pecos (1934) as Sam Sawtelle
- Black Fury (1935) as Lefty - Company Policeman
- Alibi Ike (1935) as Lieutenant
- The Case of the Curious Bride (1935) as Ferry Pilot (uncredited)
- Baby Face Harrington (1935) as Hank
- West Point of the Air (1935) as Lieutenant Kelly
- Night Life of the Gods (1935) as Times Square Policeman (uncredited)
- People Will Talk (1935) as Duffy (uncredited)
- Mister Dynamite (1935) as Rod
- It Had to Happen (1936) as Workman (uncredited)
- Robin Hood of El Dorado (1936) as Doc (uncredited)
- 15 Maiden Lane (1936) as Fake Detective (uncredited)
- Anything Goes (1936) as Purser (uncredited)
- Let's Make a Million (1936)
- Parole! (1936) as Police Sergeant (uncredited)
- With Love and Kisses (1936) as Joe
- Souls at Sea (1937) as Slaver (uncredited)
- Carnival Queen (1937) as Bert MacGregor
- Bad Guy (1937) as Griffith - Prison Electrician (uncredited)
- Between Two Women (1937) as Mr. Hendry (uncredited)
- Double Wedding (1937) as Mounted Policeman (uncredited)
- Invisible Stripes (1939) as Alec - New 'Fish' (uncredited)
- Charlie McCarthy, Detective (1939) as McNeil (uncredited)
- Little Old New York (1940) as Minor Role (uncredited)
- Brother Orchid (1940) as Tim O'Hara (uncredited)
- King of the Lumberjacks (1940) as Mr. Gregg, Parole Officer
- Navy Blues (1941) as Chief Petty Officer (uncredited)
- They Died with Their Boots On (1941) as Corporal (uncredited)
- Easy Come, Easy Go (1947) asDesk Sergeant (uncredited)
- Jungle Patrol (1948) as Sgt. Hanley
- The Naked City (1948) as Charles Meade - Parole Officer (uncredited)
- Romance on the High Seas (1948) as Detective Humphrey (uncredited)
- Scudda Hoo! Scudda Hay! (1948) as Mike Malone (uncredited)
- The Snake Pit (1948) as Attendant (uncredited)
- Up in Central Park (1948) as Ward Heeler (uncredited)
- The Dark Past (1948) as Al's Father (uncredited)
- The Clay Pigeon (1949) as Abbott (uncredited)
- Flaming Fury (1949) as Battalion Fire Chief
- The Fountainhead (1949) asJury Foreman (uncredited)
- Scene of the Crime (1949) as Detective Edward Joseph Monigan (uncredited)
- Top o' the Morning (1949) as Bartender (uncredited)
- White Heat (1949) as The Reader (uncredited)
- The Woman on Pier 13 (1949) as Charles Dover
- Father Makes Good (1950) as Mr. Joe Sweeney
- Indian Territory (1950) as Jim Colton
- Sideshow (1950)
- Southside 1-1000 (1950) as Hugh B. Pringle - Treasury Agent
- Triple Trouble (1950) as Bat Armstrong
- Gambling House (1950) as Homicide Detective Jenson (uncredited)
- The Whip Hand (1951) as Nelson - Gate Guard (uncredited)
- On Dangerous Ground (1951) as Sgt. Wendell (uncredited)
- The Las Vegas Story (1952) as Stickman (uncredited)
- The Pride of St. Louis (1952) as Marty (uncredited)
- French Peep Show (1952)
- Sky Full of Moon (1952) as Foreman (uncredited)
- The Wild North (1952) as Bartender (uncredited)
- Above and Beyond (1952) as Maj. Gen. Creston (uncredited)
- The Clown (1953) as Actor as the Carpenter (uncredited)
- Francis Covers the Big Town (1953) as Bailiff (uncredited)
- The Great Diamond Robbery (1954) as Nightwatchman Connelly (uncredited)
- Three Hours to Kill (1954) as Townsman (uncredited)
- Betrayed Women (1955) as Hostage Guard
- The Big Tip Off (1955) as Bartender at Scoop's (uncredited)
- The Naked Street (1955) as Mr. Hough (uncredited)
- Night Freight (1955) as Kelly
- Ten Wanted Men (1955) as Queen Hotel Bartender (uncredited)
- The Fastest Gun Alive (1956)
- Yaqui Drums (1956) as Bartender
- Beau James (1957) as 1st Policeman (uncredited)
- Screaming Mimi (1958) as Elmer - Engineer (uncredited)
- The Sheepman (1958) as Detective Guerney (uncredited)
