= Tickle Me (musical) =

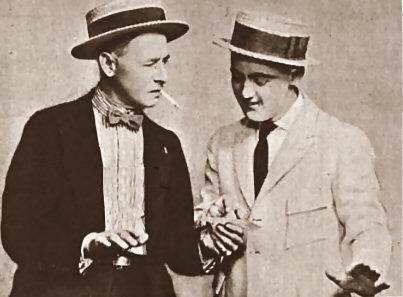
L-R William Collier, Sr. and Frank Tinney American Magazine, 1921

Tickle Me was a Broadway musical comedy in two acts with book and lyrics by Oscar Hammerstein II, Otto Harbach and Frank Mandel and music and musical direction provided by Herbert Stothart. Tickle Me was produced by Arthur Hammerstein and opened at the Selwyn Theater on August 17, 1920 and closed after 207 performances on February 12, 1921. The musical then embarked on a successful road tour with a schedule that extending well into the spring of the following year.

== Principal Cast and Crew ==
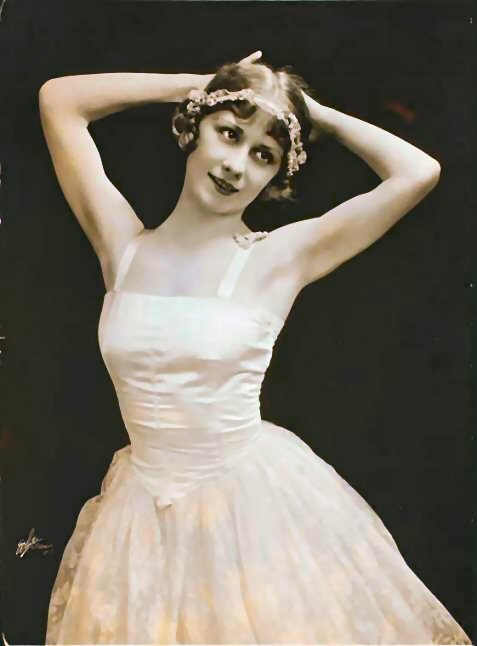
Dancer Olga Mishka from Tickle Me, 1921 NYPL Digital Gallery

- Stage Director .. William Collier, Sr.
- Dances, Ensembles .. Bert French
- Scenic Design .. Joseph A. Physioc;
- Costume Design .. Charles LeMaire
- General Manager .. Hugh Grady;
- Company Manager .. Charles Voloshen
- Stage Manager .. Tom O'Hare.
- Mary Fairbanks .. Louise Allen
- Jack Barton .. Allen Kearns
- Parcel Poisson Vic Casmore
- Frank Tinney .. Frank Tinney
- Alice West .. Marguerite Zender
- Customs Inspector.. Benjamin Mulvey
- A Native Boatman .. William Dorriani
- Dancers .. Olga and Mishka
- Dancers .. J. Frances Grant and Ted Wing
- A Slave .. Jack Htesler
- The Tongra .. Marcel Rousseau
- Blah Blah .. Harry Pearce
- Keeper of the Second House .. Tex Cooper

Source:Burns and Mantle, 1921 and IBDB.com

== Synopsis ==
Setting: Hollywood, California, Calcutta, India, and in-between

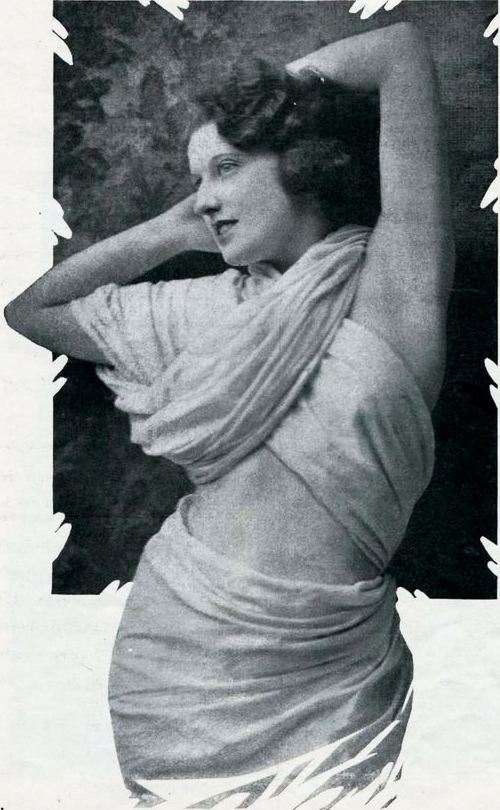
Memphis Russell, a cast member in Tickle Me on Broadway (1920)

Act I.

Scene 1 — Studio of Poisson Picture Corp., Hollywood.
Scene 2 — Customs House, Calcutta, India.
Scene 3 — Garden of Paradise, Tibet.
Scene 4 — The Veil of Mystery.
Scene 5 — Ceremony of the Sacred Bath.

Act II.

Scene 1 — The Bower of Temptation.
Scene 2 — Anywhere.
Scene 3 — Customs House at Calcutta.
Scene 4 — Aboard S. S. Tickle Me.

Tickle Me, that one writer described as a mélange of girls, jazz, novelties and Frank Tinney, was a musical tale that revolved around a Hollywood studio property man (comedian Frank Tinney) who is sent to remote Tibet for a movie shoot and the love story (Louise Allen) that ensued.

.

== Reception- ==
Tinney, Life of Tickle Me.

All together the crowd seemed to like Tickle Me. It has nothing startling in the way of scenes or jokes or singing and at times it does move slowly, but it usually hits a bright spot before it really becomes dull – and, of course, there’s Frank Tinney. The New York Times, August 18, 1920.

Frank Tinney in Tickle Me at the Shubert Theatre.

Filled with melodies, life and spiritedly presented by cast and chorus, Arthur Hammerstein’s musigirl piece Tickle Me with Frank Tinney as chief tickler, is holding merry sway at the Shubert Theatre. After the opening scene Frank Tinney washes off the burn cork and appears in white face. His admirers agree he has never been more funny. Boston Globe September 18, 1921

Munsey's Magazine, 1921

Can you imagine a show in which the star's role gives him everything his heart could wish for, and yet which furnishes its audience with such varied entertainment in other directions that at times the hearers forget that there is a star at all? Such a production is " Tickle Me "—a name quite unworthy of the really meritorious medley of song, dance, comedy, spectacle, and novelty furnished by Arthur Hammerstein in order to blazon Frank Tinney's name in the electrics.

Otto Harbach, Oscar Hammerstein II, and Frank Mandel collaborated on the book, the music is credited to a new name among the composers—Herbert Stothart— while the staging was up to William Collier, who during his long run in town last winter found time to place his valuable services at the disposal of more than one manager. There are nine sets in the two acts, and while the story is negligible, the eye is kept so constantly on the alert with worth-while offerings in scenery, costume, and dance that more plot would only seem obtrusive.

The soap-suds episode in the sacred bath ceremony, although introduced by Bert French and Alice Ellis in vaudeville as long ago as when the late Oscar Hammerstein was holding forth at the Victoria, on the site of the present Rialto, still leaves one puzzled as to how it is done. The boat scene in the Garden of Paradise is an exquisite creation of Joseph Physioc. The two dance teams—Olga and Mishka, Frances Grant and Ted Wing—put over some great stuff, and my record would be incomplete without mention of the sacred horse, whose absence at any performance must leave Tinney minus many laughs unless a competent understudy is provided.

Tinney appears as himself—otherwise as the property man of a motion-picture concern that journeys to Tibet to film certain ceremonies, the witnessing of which is forbidden to " foreign devils." Although discarding black face after the opening scene, and permitting the public to see what a really good-looking fellow he is, you may be sure that he's just as funny in " whites." And listen—the famed sextet of "Florodora " must look to its laurels. In the last half-hour of Tickle Me there is an octet of chorus-girls that's a sure-enough novelty, set forth with such clever comedy work by the girls aforesaid as insures them half a dozen encores nightly, and keeps Arthur Hammerstein on the anxious seat lest rival managers should offer them tempting contracts to become principals elsewhere.

As to Tickle Me principals, Louise Allen, niece and namesake of William Collier's first wife, and last year Somebody's Sweetheart, by sheer power of personality makes you cotton to a character you are at first disposed heartily to dislike. Her dances, too, with Allen Kearns are pleasing to a degree. Kearns, who wants to know why critics will persist in comparing him with George Cohan just because he imitated the latter last spring in What's in a Name? has worked his way to the front as juvenile lead from a start in which chance played a peculiar part ten years ago, when he was seventeen.
