= Waiting for the Robert E. Lee =

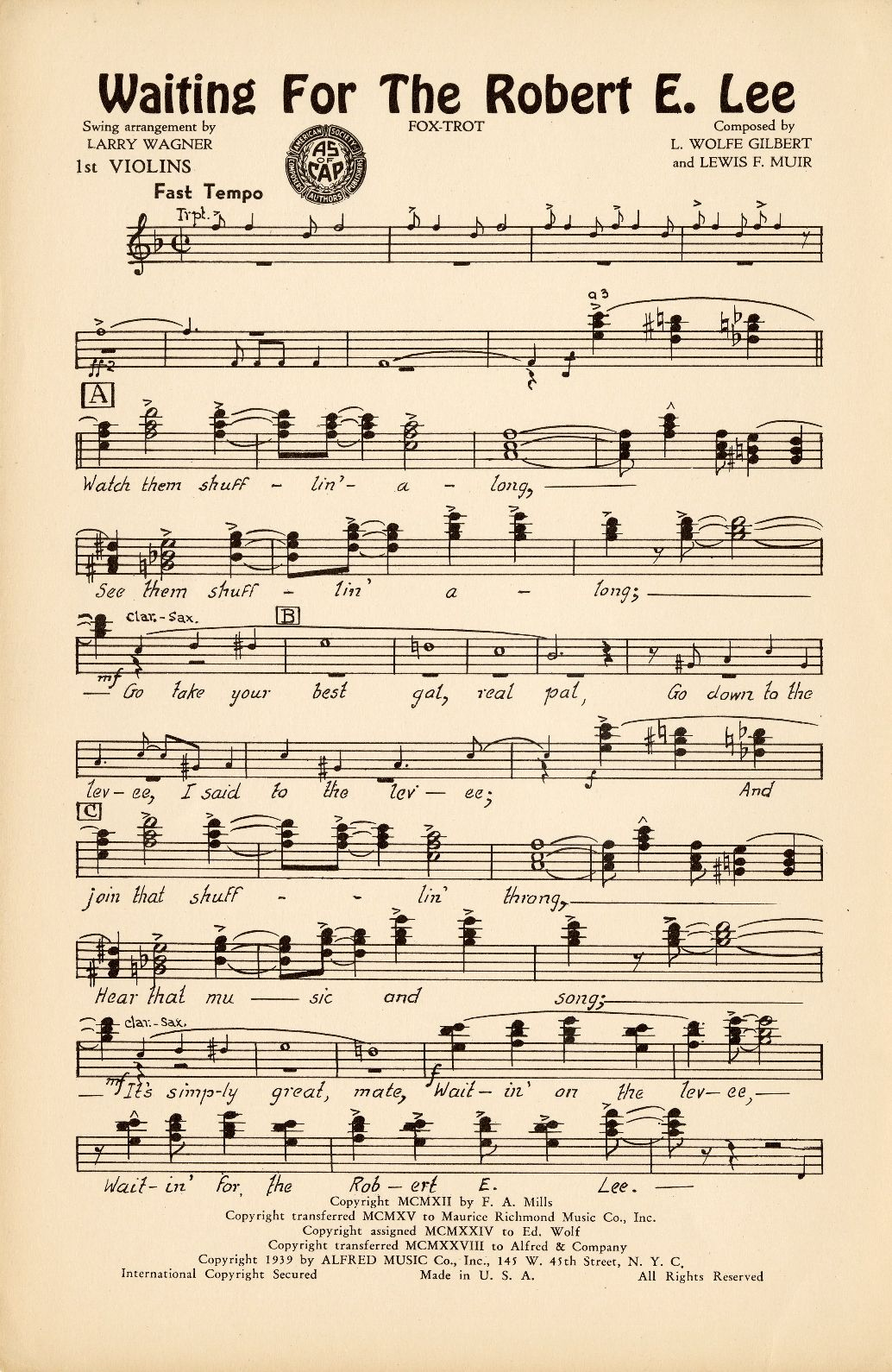

Song
- Published: 1912
- Songwriters: Lewis F. Muir; L. Wolfe Gilbert

"Waiting for the Robert E. Lee" is an American popular song written in 1912, with music by Lewis F. Muir and lyrics by L. Wolfe Gilbert. The "Robert E. Lee" in the title refers to the steamboat of that name.

Popular versions in 1912 were by the Heidelberg Quintet, Arthur Collins & Byron Harlan, and by Dolly Connolly.

It has since been recorded by such artists as Al Jolson, Benny Goodman, Wayne Newton, Tennessee Ernie Ford, Louis Jordan, Dean Martin, Russ Conway, Chas and Dave, and Lizzie Miles. It was performed in blackface by Judy Garland and Mickey Rooney in the 1941 MGM musical film Babes on Broadway.

In Alec Wilder's 1972 study, American Popular Song: The Great Innovators, 1900–1950, the songwriter and critic discusses "Waiting for the Robert E. Lee" as an early example of the evolution of American popular song and development of the Great American Songbook. Wilder asserts that with this song, "Muir caught the spirit of the new rhythms that had burst out with ragtime...This is a good song in any decade and remarkable for its time, certainly as much so as "Alexander's Ragtime Band."

The tune has been used with other words, such as the French song "J'Ai Envie De Chanter" (not a translation), with a new lyric by Eddy Marnay, first performed by Mireille Mathieu.
