= The Cat and the Fiddle (film) =

1934 film by Sam Wood, William K. Howard

- Theatrical release poster
- Directed by: William K. Howard; Sam Wood (uncredited)
- Written by: Otto A. Harbach (book); Bella Spewack (screenplay)
- Produced by: Bernard H. Hyman
- Starring: Ramon Novarro; Jeanette MacDonald
- Cinematography: Charles G. Clarke; Ray Rennahan; Harold Rosson
- Edited by: Frank Hull
- Production company: Metro-Goldwyn-Mayer
- Distributed by: Loew's Inc.
- Release date: February 16, 1934
- Running time: 88 minutes
- Country: United States
- Language: English
- Budget: $843,000
- Box office: $455,000 (Domestic earnings) $644,000 (Foreign earnings)

The Cat and the Fiddle is a 1934 American pre-Code romantic musical film directed by William K. Howard. It is based on the hit 1931 Broadway musical of the same name by Jerome Kern and Otto A. Harbach, about a romance between a struggling composer and an American singer. The film stars Ramon Novarro and Jeanette MacDonald in her MGM debut.

== Plot ==
The film plot is substantially changed from that of the Broadway musical. Victor Florescu is a composer desperately trying to get his operetta to opening night. First his leading lady leaves, taking the bulk of their budget with her. Then the male lead splits, leaving Victor to fill his role. Next he calls upon an old love, singer Shirley Sheridan to be his ingénue, but she insists that she is leaving the theater to marry her affluent, but unfaithful fiancé.

== Cast ==
- Ramon Novarro as Victor Florescu
- Jeanette MacDonald as Shirley Sheridan
- Frank Morgan as Jules Daudet
- Charles Butterworth as Charles
- Jean Hersholt as Professor Bertier
- Vivienne Segal as Odette Brieux
- Frank Conroy as The Theatre Owner
- Henry Armetta as the Taxi Driver
- Adrienne D'Ambricourt as Concierge
- Joseph Cawthorn as Rodolphe 'Rudy' Brieux
- Sterling Holloway as Flower Messenger (uncredited)

== Box office ==
The film grossed a total (domestic and foreign) of $1,099,000: $455,000 from the US and Canada and $644,000 elsewhere resulting in a loss of $142,000. The film was a box office disappointment for MGM.

== Technicolor sequences ==
The final reel was filmed in the then newly perfected three-strip Technicolor process, previously used only in Walt Disney's Silly Symphonies cartoons. The finale in 3-strip Technicolor was not restored to its original hues until the film was shown by Turner Classic Movies on TNT in the late 1980s.

== See also ==
- List of early color feature films
