= Leave It to Gerry =

1924 silent film

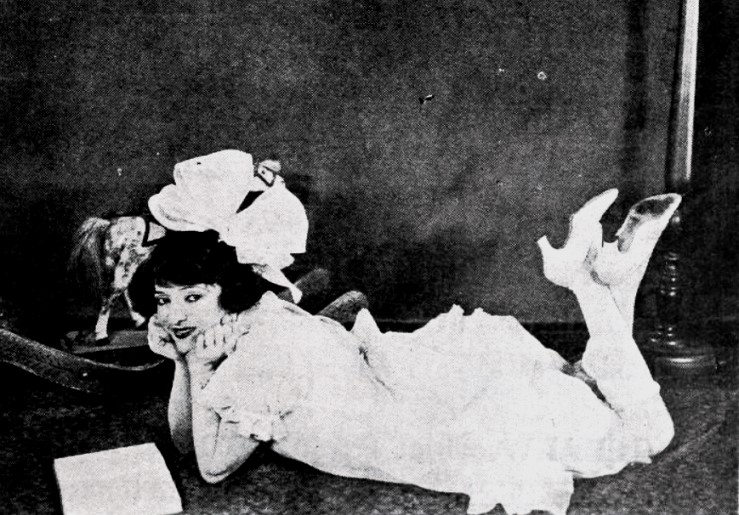
- Still with Billie Rhodes
- Directed by: Arvid E. Gillstrom
- Written by: Adam Shirk
- Starring: Billie Rhodes; William Collier Jr. Claire McDowell
- Production company: Ben Wilson Productions
- Distributed by: Grand-Asher Distributing Corporation
- Release date: January 30, 1924
- Running time: 60 minutes
- Country: United States
- Language: Silent (English intertitles)

Leave It to Gerry is a 1924 American silent comedy film directed by Arvid E. Gillstrom and starring Billie Rhodes, William Collier Jr., and Claire McDowell.

== Plot ==
As described in a film magazine review, Geraldine Brent, known as Gerry, goes to Chicago to be educated at her rich aunt's expense. The land on which her mother's house stands is mortgaged but has oil on it, and Colonel Pettijohn conspires to obtain possession of it. The mortgage is foreclosed and Mrs. Brent is taken to the workhouse. Gerry meets former boy acquaintance Dan Forbes and becomes his sweetheart. They ride to the workhouse and rescue Mrs. Brent. Colonel Pettijohn's schemes are defeated and Mrs. Brent regains her property.

== Cast ==
- Billie Rhodes as Geraldine Brent
- William Collier Jr. as Dan Forbes
- Claire McDowell as Mrs. Brent
- Kate Lester as Mrs. Turner-Prescott
- Joseph W. Girard as Colonel Pettijohn
- Allan Cavan as Mr. Burton
- Billy Lord as Little Girl

== Preservation ==
With no prints of Leave It to Gerry located in any film archives, it is a lost film.

== Bibliography ==
- Robert B. Connelly. The Silents: Silent Feature Films, 1910-36, Volume 40, Issue 2. December Press, 1998.
