= The Blue Bonnet =

1919 film directed by Louis William Chaudet

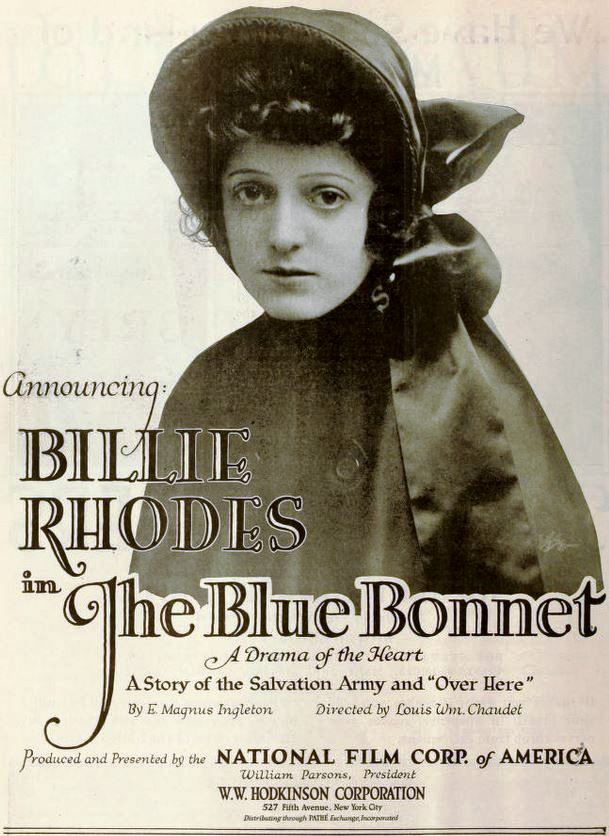
- Directed by: Louis Chaudet
- Written by: E. Magnus Ingleton
- Produced by: William Parsons
- Starring: Billie Rhodes; Ben F. Wilson; Irene Rich
- Cinematography: Allen M. Davey
- Production company: National Film Corporation of America
- Distributed by: Pathé Exchange; W. W. Hodkinson Corporation
- Release date: July 1919
- Running time: 50 minutes
- Country: United States
- Languages: Silent; English intertitles

The Blue Bonnet is a 1919 American silent drama film directed by Louis Chaudet and starring Billie Rhodes, Ben F. Wilson, and Irene Rich.

== Cast ==
- Billie Rhodes as Ruth
- Ben F. Wilson as Jairus Drake
- Irene Rich as Martha Drake
- Stanhope Wheatcroft as Sidney Haviland
- William A. Carroll as Caleb Fry
- Scott R. Beal as Danny
- Charlotte Merriam as Selma
- Lloyd Bacon as Jan Peterson

== Bibliography ==
- Ken Wlaschin. The Silent Cinema in Song, 1896-1929: An Illustrated History and Catalog of Songs Inspired by the Movies and Stars, with a List of Recordings. McFarland & Company, 2009.
