= Cuddle up a Little Closer, Lovey Mine =

"Cuddle Up A Little Closer, Lovey Mine"
- Sheet music, 1908

Song
- Published: 1908
- Composer: Karl Hoschna
- Lyricist: Otto Harbach

"Cuddle Up A Little Closer, Lovey Mine" is a popular song. The music was written by Karl Hoschna, the lyrics by Otto Harbach. The song was published in 1908. From the Broadway musical Three Twins when it was introduced by Alice Yorke.

Ada Jones and Billy Murray had a huge success with their duet recording of the song for Victor Records (catalog No. 5532) in 1908. They also recorded the song for Edison 9950, Zon-o-Phone 5175 and Indestructible 876.

== Other notable recordings ==
- Dick Jurgens - his recording for Okeh Records (catalog No. 6456) briefly charted in 1942.
- Kay Armen - a brief chart entry in 1943.
- Doris Day and James Emmons - included in the album On Moonlight Bay (1951)
- Julie London - for her album Swing Me an Old Song (1959)
- Bing Crosby included the song in a medley on his album Join Bing and Sing Along (1959)
- Dean Martin - for his album Sleep Warm (1958)
- Vic Damone - included in his album Closer Than a Kiss (1958).

== Film appearances ==
- 1941 - Birth of the Blues - performed by Mary Martin
- 1943 - Coney Island - performed by Betty Grable; reprised by Phyllis Kennedy
- 1951 - On Moonlight Bay - performed by Gordon MacRae and Billy Gray
- 1958 - Friz Freleng's cartoon Knighty Knight Bugs, the Singing Sword hums the tune of the song.
- 1960 - Tall Story - performed by Jane Fonda and Anthony Perkins
- 1974 - Alice Doesn't Live Here Anymore, Alice's son, Tommy, watches Betty Grable's performance of the song in Coney Island on the television in their motel room.
- 1996 - Billy Crudup and Sanjeev Ramabhadran sang an English/Hindi version of the song in Woody Allen's film Everyone Says I Love You.
