= The Cat and the Fiddle (musical) =

Musical composed by Jerome Kern; book and lyrics by Otto Harbach

- Music: Jerome Kern
- Lyrics: Otto Harbach
- Book: Otto Harbach
- Premiere: October 15, 1931: Globe Theatre; New York City
- Productions: 1931 Broadway; 1932 West End

The Cat and the Fiddle is a musical with music by Jerome Kern and book and lyrics by Otto Harbach. The story is about love and conflict between an American popular music composer and a European classical composer. Hit numbers from the show included "Try to Forget", "She Didn't Say Yes", "The Breeze Kissed Your Hair" and "The Night Was Made for Love."

The original Broadway production opened on October 15, 1931, and ran for 395 performances, a long run for the time period. A 1932 London production followed at the Palace Theatre. A 1934 film adaptation with a substantially altered storyline starred Jeanette MacDonald and Ramon Novarro.

== Productions ==
The original Broadway production opened at the Globe Theatre on October 15, 1931, moved to George M. Cohan's Theatre on May 24, 1932, and ran for a total of 395 performances, an unusual success for the Depression years. It was produced by Max Gordon and staged by José Ruben. The show featured Bettina Hall as Shirley Sheridan, Georges Metaxa as Victor Florescu, George Meader as Pompineau, Odette Myrtil as prima donna Odette, and Flora Le Breton as Maizie Gripps. Eddie Foy Jr. and Lawrence Grossmith were also in the original cast. Ensemble dances were staged by Albertina Rasch and featured the Albertina Rasch Dancers.

The 1932 London production by C. B. Cochran at the Palace Theatre featured Alice Delysia, Peggy Wood and Francis Lederer.

An April 1990 concert version in New York's Weill Recital Hall used orchestrations by Richard Rodney Bennett. The cast included Judy Kaye, Paige O'Hara, Christine Abraham, Davis Gaines, Cris Groenendaal, Angelina Reaux, Ruth Golden, and Kurt Ollmann.

== Summary ==
In the 1930s, Shirley Sheridan, an American popular song composer, comes to Brussels to study music. She meets Romanian classical composer Victor Florescu, who is writing an operetta, The Passionate Pilgrim. Shirley and Victor fall in love, but they find themselves in conflict when the producer of the operetta says that Victor's score is too traditional and asks that Shirley's uptempo jazzy songs be interpolated into it. All ends well.

== Roles and original cast ==
- Alexander Sheridan – Eddie Foy Jr.
- Shirley Sheridan – Bettina Hall
- Pompineau – George Meader
- Victor Florescu – Georges Metaxa
- Angie Sheridan – Doris Carson
- Odette – Odette Myrtil
- Constance Carrington – Margaret Adams
- Maizie Gripps – Flora Le Breton
- Jean Colbert – Peter Chambers
- Claudine – Lucette Valsy
- Major Sir George Wilfred Chatterly – Lawrence Grossmith

== Musical numbers ==
=== Act One ===
- "Opening Scene" - Shirley, Book Vendor, Mme. Abjour, and People of Brussels
- "La nuit est pour l'amour" – Pompineau
- "She Didn't Say Yes" - Pompineau and Shirley
- "Scene" - Victor and Shirley
- "The Night Was Made for Love" - Pompineau
- "Scene" (Cont.) - Victor and Shirley
- "She Didn't Say Yes" (reprise) - Shirley
- "La Jeune Fille" - Mme. Abjour
- "Finaletto: The Night Was Made For Love" - Pompineau
- "Scene at the Entrance to 'La Petite Maison'" - Shirley and Angie
- "The Love Parade" – Pompineau, Maizie Gripps, and Chorus
- "Scene in Victor's Studio" - Victor, Odette, and Constance
- "One Moment Alone" - Victor, Odette, and Constance
- "Piano Foxtrot" - Shirley
- "The Breeze Kissed Your Hair" – Victor Florescu
- "Shirley at the Piano" - Shirley
- "Dueling Pianos" - Victor and Shirley
- "Finaletto: The Night Was Made for Love" (reprise) - Pompineau and Girls
- "Scene at Shirley's Apartment" - Shirley, Angie, Daudet, and Alexander
- "Try to Forget" – Shirley Sheridan, Alexander Sheridan and Angie Sheridan
- "Victor at the Piano" - Victor
- "Try to Forget (Cont.)" - Shirley
- "Dance" - Alexander and Angie
- "Prologue to the Finale of 'The Passionate Pilgrim'" - Commere (Claudine) and Compere (Jean)
- "Poor Pierrot" – Commere and Compere
- "Finale of Victor's Play 'The Passionate Pilgrim'" – Odette, Claudine, Constance Carrington and Jean Colbert
- "Dance" - Alexander and Angie
- "Scene" - Shirley and Victor
- "Finale: Try to Forget" (reprise with descant) - Shirley, Victor, and Chorus

=== Act Two ===
- Entr'acte
- "Opening: Reprises of 'Prologue', 'Try to Forget', and 'Poor Pierrot'" - Odette
- "The Crystal Candelabra (The Love Parade)" - Pompineau
- "She Didn't Say Yes" (reprise with phonograph) – Shirley
- "Transition to Scene II (The Night Was Made For Love)" - Pompineau
- "She Didn't Say Yes" (reprise) - Shirley, Pompineau, and Daudet
- "Scene in Victor's Rooms" - Victor and Biddlesby
- "A New Love Is Old" – Victor
- "One Moment Alone" (reprise) – Shirley, Victor, and Chorus
- "Scene and 'The Breeze Kissed Your Hair'" (reprise) - Victor
- "Finaletto: Choral Scene" - Chorus
- "A Phantasy" - Chorus
- "Scene in Theatre Dressing Room"
- "Scene Before 'La Petite Maison'" - Streetwasher and Victor
- "Opening at 'La Petite Maison'" - Daudet and Guests
- "Hh! Cha! Cha!" – Shirley
- "Dance" - Odette and Guests
- "Poor Pierrot" (reprise) - Pompineau
- "She Didn't Say Yes'" (reprise) – Shirley
- "Finale: 'One Moment Alone'" - Shirley, Victor, and Chorus

== Musical analysis ==
Kern and Harbach aimed to create a modern operetta set in contemporary Brussels "in which music and story were indispensable to each other." Kern's goal was to provide almost continuous music throughout The Cat and the Fiddle, and many passages of dialogue feature musical underscoring.

== Adaptations ==
A black and white film version was made in 1934 by MGM, starring Jeanette MacDonald and Ramon Novarro.
