= Murder in the Fleet =

1935 film by Edward Sedgwick

- Theatrical release poster
- Directed by: Edward Sedgwick
- Written by: James Gleason (uncredited)
- Screenplay by: Frank Wead; Joe Sherman
- Story by: Edward Sedgwick
- Produced by: Lucien Hubbard
- Starring: Robert Taylor; Jean Parker; Ted Healy
- Cinematography: Milton Krasner
- Edited by: Conrad A. Nervig
- Music by: Paul Marquardt (uncredited)
- Production company: Metro-Goldwyn-Mayer
- Distributed by: Loew's Inc.
- Release date: May 27, 1935
- Running time: 69 minutes
- Country: United States
- Language: English
- Budget: $189,000
- Box office: $630,000

Murder in the Fleet is a 1935 American murder mystery/comedy-drama film set aboard USS Carolina. Released by Metro-Goldwyn-Mayer, the film was directed by Edward Sedgwick and stars Robert Taylor and Jean Parker.

== Plot ==
Captain John Winslow is notified by the Secretary of the Navy that his cruiser will be receiving a new firing control gear manufactured by World Electric company, which is supposed to revolutionize naval warfare. The gear vanishes and is quickly located by intelligence officers as it is being transported across the Mexican border.

When the gear is returned to the ship it must be installed and be working within 24 hours. Lieutenant Tom Randolph and Captain Winslow welcome aboard visitors Al Duval, who works for World Electric Company, and Victor Hanson, from the Navy Department, to help Randolph with the installation. Meanwhile, Sailor Spud Burke has to contend with 'Gabby' Mac ONeill, also on board to help with the installation, as a rival for his sweetheart Toots Timmons.

When the new gear is being lifted into place a cable breaks and it is dropped. Later this is found to be an act of sabotage. When that doesn't stop the installation, Al Duval is murdered during a gun salute. The investigation begins and suspicions are running high when a second murder takes place; this time it is the chief electrician.

The Captain devises a plot to trap the murderer and the trail soon leads to the powder magazine, where Victor Hanson threatens to blow up the ship. Hanson claims that World Electric Company had stolen the idea for the new system from him and he wants revenge. Ultimately Hanson is captured and the gear is installed.

== Cast ==
- Robert Taylor as Lt. Tom 'Tommy' Randolph
- Jean Parker as Betty Lansing
- Ted Healy as Gabby' Mac ONeill
- Una Merkel as 'Toots' Timmons
- Nat Pendleton as 'Spud' Burke
- Jean Hersholt as Victor Hanson
- Arthur Byron as Capt. John Winslow
- Frank Shields as Lt. Arnold
- Donald Cook as Lt. Cmdr. David Tucker
- Mischa Auer as Kamchukan consul (uncredited)
- Ward Bond as 'Heavy' Johnson (uncredited)
- Phyllis Crane as (uncredited)
- Mary Doran as Jenny Lane (uncredited)
- Tom Dugan as 'Greasy' (uncredited)
- Fred Graham as Crewman (uncredited)
- Roger Gray as Yard Master (uncredited)
- Raymond Hatton as Mr. Al Duval (uncredited)
- Robert Livingston as Spencer - Ship's Doctor (uncredited)
- Keye Luke as Consul's Secretary (uncredited)
- George Magrill as Sailor on Watch (uncredited)
- J.P. McGowan as Chief of Police (uncredited)
- Leila McIntyre as Mrs. Justin (uncredited)
- Edward Norris as Sleepy - Sailor (uncredited)
- Lee Phelps as Officer Berating Guard (uncredited)
- Syd Saylor as Chief Petty Officer (uncredited)
- Richard Tucker as Harry Jeffries (uncredited)
- Charles C. Wilson as Cmdr. Brown (uncredited)

== Crew ==
- George B. Seitz - Second Unit Director (uncredited)
- Al Shenberg - Assistant Director (uncredited)
- Cedric Gibbons – Art Director
- David Townsend – Associate Art Director
- Edwin B. Willis – Associate Art Director
- Edward Ward - composer: stock music (uncredited)
- Douglas Shearer – Recording Director
- Fred Gabourie – Set Designer (uncredited)

== Box office ==
According to MGM records the film earned $345,000 in the US and Canada and $285,000 elsewhere resulting in a profit of $216,000.
