= The Girl of My Dreams =

1911 musical

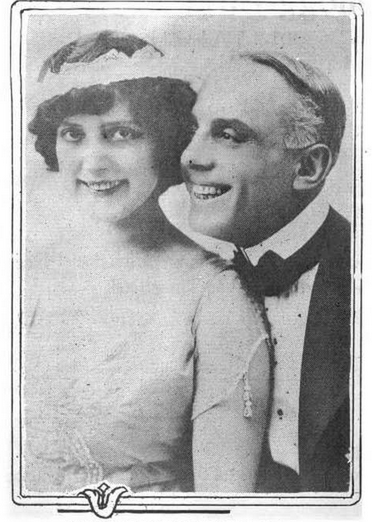
Leila McIntyre and John Hyams.

The Girl of My Dreams is a musical in two acts with music by Karl Hoschna, lyrics by Otto Harbach, and a book by Harbach and Wilbur Nesbit. It premiered at Broadway's Criterion Theatre on August 7, 1911. It ran for 40 performances, closing on September 9, 1911. Produced by Joseph M. Gaites and directed by Frank Smithson, the production starred the married vaudevillian entertainers Leila McIntyre (as Lucy Medders) and John Hyams (as Harry Swifton). The New York Times critique of the production stated that McIntyre had "a pretty saucer-eyed innocent stare and quavering treble" suited to her ingenue role. The musical was adapted into a silent film of the same name.
