= The Star Reporter (1921 film) =

1921 film

- Directed by: Duke Worne
- Based on: The Mysterious Mr. Garland by Wyndham Martin
- Starring: Billie Rhodes; Truman Van Dyke; William T. Horne
- Production company: Berwilla Film Corporation
- Distributed by: Arrow Film Corporation
- Release date: April 1921
- Running time: 60 minutes
- Country: United States
- Languages: Silent; English intertitles

The Star Reporter is a 1921 American silent mystery film directed by Duke Worne and starring Billie Rhodes, Truman Van Dyke and William T. Horne.

== Synopsis ==
After her father has been declared insane and confined in a sanatorium, Nan Lambert begins to investigate with the assistance of an undercover reporter. Eventually they expose the man behind the whole scheme.

== Cast ==
- Billie Rhodes as Nan Lambert
- Truman Van Dyke as Anthony Trent
- William T. Horne as Conington Warren

== Bibliography ==
- Munden, Kenneth White. The American Film Institute Catalog of Motion Pictures Produced in the United States, Part 1. University of California Press, 1997.
