= The Crinoline Girl =

1914 play

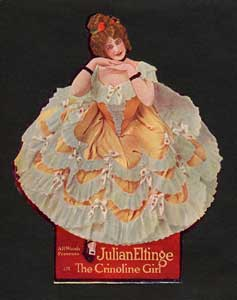
- Poster featuring star Julian Eltinge
- Original language: English
- Written by: Julian Eltinge, Otto Hauerbach, Percy Wenrich
- Genre: Comedy
- Setting: Hotel de Beau Rivage

Premiere
- Date: March 16, 1914
- Place: Knickerbocker Theatre

The Crinoline Girl is a 1914 musical comedy written by Julian Eltinge, Otto Hauerbach, and Percy Wenrich. Producer Al Woods staged it on Broadway.

== Plot ==
Tom Hale wants to marry Dorothy Ainsley, but her father Richard Ainsley does not want to allow it. Although Tom is from a wealthy family, Richard challenges Tom to show that he can earn $10,000 of his own money. Only then will Richard approve of the marriage. Tom decides he can do this by collecting the reward that Richard is offering for a diamond recently stolen from his family. The thieves are operating from the Hotel de Beau Rivage in Lausanne, Switzerland, where the Ainsleys are also staying. Tom tracks down the gang's female accomplice, the titular Crinoline Girl, and subdues her. He then puts on women's clothes to disguise himself as the Crinoline Girl and capture the thieves. Tom's success facilitates not only his own romance with Dorothy, but also the romance of his sister Alice Hale with Dorothy's cousin Jerry Ainsley.

== Productions ==
The show had a preview production in Atlantic City starting on February 9, 1914. It opened on Broadway at the Knickerbocker Theatre on March 16, 1914, and ran there until May 30, 1914.

== Cast and characters ==
The characters and cast from the Broadway production are given below:

Cast of the Broadway production of The Crinoline Girl
| Character | Broadway cast |
|---|---|
| Dorothy Ainsley | Helen Luttrell |
| Lord Robert Bromleigh | Herbert McKenzie |
| Smith | Joseph S. Marba |
| Marie | Augusta Scott |
| Richard Ainsley | Charles P. Morrison |
| Jerry Ainsley | Herbert Corthell |
| Alice Hale | Maidel Turner |
| Tom Hale | Julian Eltinge |
| Charles Griffith | James C. Spottswood |
| John Lawton | Walter Horton |
| Rosalind Bromleigh | Edna Whistler |
| William | Edwin Cushman |

== Reception ==
The New York Times gave the play a mostly positive review, describing it as amusing and complimenting Eltinge's skill as a female impersonator, but criticizing "exceedingly bad acting" by two other members of the cast. The Brooklyn Daily Eagle praised Eltinge, Corthell and the rest of the cast for "a really good farce", although the reviewer said it was not really a musical since there were only three songs. The Theatre magazine complimented Eltinge for incorporating his female impersonation into a meaningful plot that justified it, calling the result "exceedingly diverting".

Life magazine allowed only that the play was not "entirely bad". Theater historian Gerald Bordman attributed the play's limited success primarily to Eltinge.

Although the play was a musical and Wenrich had written a number of hit songs, none of the play's songs became hits.
