= Indian Territory (film) =

1950 film by John English

- Theatrical release poster
- Directed by: John English
- Written by: Norman S. Hall
- Produced by: Armand Schaefer
- Starring: Gene Autry; Gail Davis; Kirby Grant; James Griffith; Philip Van Zandt; G. Pat Collins
- Cinematography: William Bradford
- Edited by: James Sweeney
- Production company: Gene Autry Productions
- Distributed by: Columbia Pictures
- Release date: September 30, 1950
- Running time: 70 minutes
- Country: United States
- Language: English

Indian Territory is a 1950 American Western film directed by John English and written by Norman S. Hall. The film stars Gene Autry, Gail Davis, Kirby Grant, James Griffith, Philip Van Zandt and G. Pat Collins. It was released on September 30, 1950, by Columbia Pictures.

== Cast ==
- Gene Autry as Gene Autry
- Gail Davis as Melody Colton
- Kirby Grant as Lieutenant Randy Mason
- James Griffith as The Apache Kid aka Johnny Corday
- Philip Van Zandt as Curt Raidler
- G. Pat Collins as Jim Colton
- Roy Gordon as Major Farrell
- Pat Buttram as Shadrach Jones
- Champion as Champ
