= Hurricane (1929 film) =

1929 film

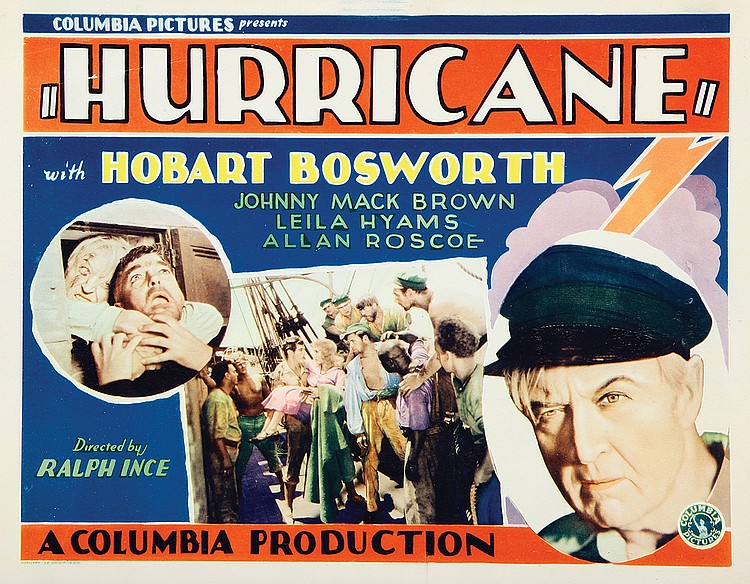
- Directed by: Ralph Ince
- Written by: Evelyn Campbell; Norman Springer; Enid Hibbard; Norman Houston; Weldon Melick
- Produced by: Harry Cohn
- Starring: Hobart Bosworth; Johnny Mack Brown; Leila Hyams
- Cinematography: Ted Tetzlaff
- Edited by: David Berg
- Production company: Columbia Pictures
- Distributed by: Columbia Pictures
- Release date: September 30, 1929
- Running time: 75 minutes
- Country: United States
- Language: English

Hurricane is a 1929 American All-Talking adventure sound film directed by Ralph Ince and starring Hobart Bosworth, Johnny Mack Brown and Leila Hyams. The sound was recorded via the Western Electric sound-on-film process. Reviewers noted that the film did not feature any musical score as was the common practice up to that time.

== Synopsis ==
Hurricane Martin, a rugged South Sea skipper, is a man of iron will and mysterious temperament. His crew both admire and fear him – admire his bold seamanship, fear the strange, maniacal laughter that bursts from him in moments of tension. On his stout vessel, Martin pushes through a raging South Pacific storm, determined to reach a remote island.

On that island, disaster has already struck. Captain Black, a ruthless pirate chief, and his band of cutthroats have been wrecked ashore. Among their captives are several unlucky sailors shanghaied from the American coast, including Dan, a young man of refinement and courage who stands apart from the rough lot.

When Hurricane's ship approaches, Captain Black hatches a bold plan: his men will ingratiate themselves with Martin, ship aboard under guise of common sailors, and once at sea, seize the cargo by mutiny.

Hurricane, seeing their plight, agrees to take them on – if they will work their passage. But he is no fool. Their false friendliness does not deceive him. He keeps watch, waiting for their move.

One night, as the pirates plot their mutiny, fate intervenes. A lifeboat is spotted drifting on the waves. From it, the crew rescue three survivors: a weary sailor, an older woman, and her daughter Mary Stevens, a lovely young woman whose innocence shines even in hardship.

The sight of the woman strikes Hurricane like a thunderbolt. She is none other than his estranged wife – the woman who, twenty years before, betrayed him by marrying another while he was away on a whaling voyage. That old wound has never healed. His heart has festered with bitterness, and his wild laughter has been its only outlet.

Now, face to face again, he burns with the desire for vengeance.

But vengeance is threatened by time itself. The woman is gravely ill, her strength fading. If death comes, it will rob him of his long-nurtured revenge. Desperate, Hurricane conceives a cruel plan: he will strike her through Mary.

He announces that Mary shall be given in marriage to Captain Black, the pirate chief. The young woman recoils in horror, and her dying mother protests with all her failing breath, insisting on her innocence – that she never betrayed Hurricane, but had been forced by circumstance into her second marriage.

Moved at last by her earnestness, Hurricane listens – and believes. As she breathes her last, he realizes the truth: Mary is his own daughter.

Rushing on deck, Hurricane finds chaos already in motion. Captain Black, claiming Mary as his prize, is advancing upon her. Dan, the young prisoner, has fallen in love with Mary and throws himself in her defense, battling Black desperately. But the struggle is too much; Dan collapses in exhaustion.

Hurricane steps into the fray, his great frame pitted against the pirate leader. At the same moment, Black's men rise against the crew, and a furious battle sweeps across the ship. Steel flashes, fists fly, the clash of cutlasses echoes over the deck.

Through the melee, Hurricane and Black duel savagely. Finally, the old skipper, driven by paternal fury and newfound love for the daughter he nearly betrayed, brings the pirate crashing down.

With their leader defeated, the pirate band breaks and is overwhelmed by Hurricane's loyal sailors. The mutiny is crushed, order restored.

As dawn breaks over the tranquil sea, the ship sails onward, steady and secure. Hurricane Martin, no longer a man haunted by revenge but reconciled with his daughter and her young suitor, finds at last a measure of peace.

== Cast ==
- Hobart Bosworth as Hurricane Martin
- Johnny Mack Brown as Dan
- Leila Hyams as Mary Stevens
- Alan Roscoe as Captain Black
- Tom O'Brien as Dugan
- Leila McIntyre as Mrs. Stevens
- Joe Bordeaux as Pete
- Eddy Chandler as Bull

== See also ==
- List of early sound feature films (1926–1929)

== Bibliography ==
- Quinlan, David. The Illustrated Guide to Film Directors. Batsford, 1983.
