= Frank Tinney =

Comedian and film actor

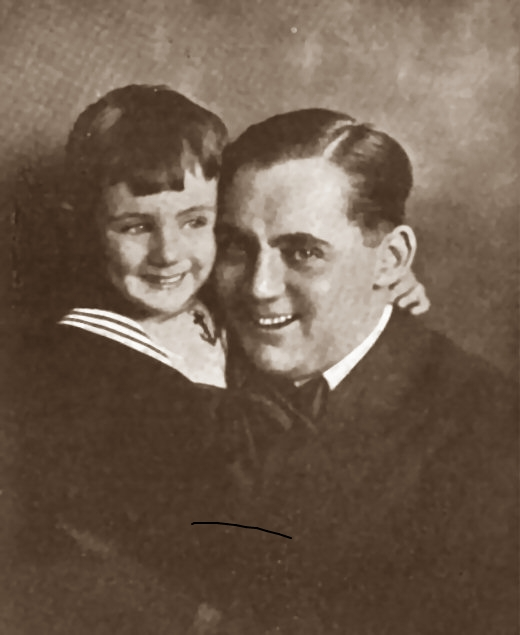
- Tinney with son Frank, Jr. in Everybody's Magazine (January–June, 1921)
- Born: Frank Aloysius Robert Tinney; March 29, 1878; Philadelphia, Pennsylvania, U.S.
- Died: November 28, 1940 (aged 62); Northport, New York, U.S.
- Resting place: Holy Cross Cemetery, Yeadon, Pennsylvania
- Occupation(s): Actor, comedian
- Years active: 1907–1926
- Spouse: Edna Davenport (m. 1913; div. 1926)
- Children: 1

Frank Aloysius Robert Tinney (March 29, 1878 – November 28, 1940) was an American blackface comedian and actor.

Tinney achieved considerable success in vaudeville and on Broadway in the early 20th century. Comedian Joe Cook considered Tinney "the greatest natural comic ever developed in America." Tinney's career and marriage were ruined after he was accused of beating his mistress, Ziegfeld girl Imogene "Bubbles" Wilson in May 1924. Although he was never formally charged, the ensuing publicity destroyed his reputation.

Tinney suffered a number of health problems after the scandal, and eventually had a nervous breakdown. He never regained his health and died in November 1940.

== Early life ==
Tinney was born in Philadelphia the third of four children raised by Hugh Francis and Mary (née Carroll) Tinney, both first generation Irish-Americans. As a boy, Tinney would later say, he sang in the choir until they found out what was the matter with the choir. He did perform with his brother Joseph at church and social functions and briefly one summer made an appearance on a vaudeville stage in a child act. His parents had hoped he would pursue a career in medicine, but instead as a young man, Tinney found work as a chief lifeguard at Atlantic City, fire engine driver and undertaker’s assistant. His antics in the latter profession eventually led to an offer to join a traveling minstrel show.

== Career ==
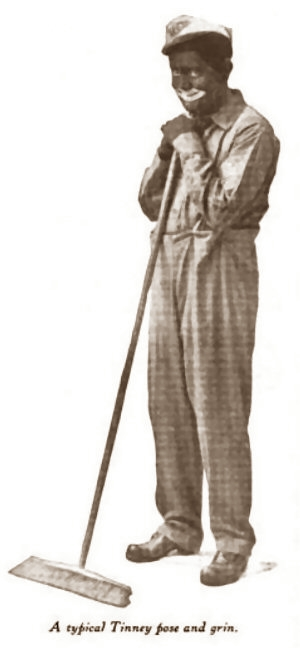
Tinney in character in Everybody's Magazine, 1921

By 1907, Tinney was performing at vaudeville venues in the United States and Canada. He made his New York debut in 1910 appearing in vaudeville shows headed by Gertrude Hoffman and later Eva Tanguay, which led the following year to a spot in the Shubert brothers’ Revue of Revues at the Winter Garden Theatre. Tinney appeared in a number of Broadway hits over the dozen years of his career. He played Noah in A Winsome Widow, a 1912 Ziegfeld adaptation of Charles Hoyt's A Trip to Chinatown. A Winsome Widow starred Emmy Wehlen and featured a very young Mae West. Tinney performed in the Ziegfeld Follies of 1913 and the musical revues, Watch Your Step (1914/1915), The Century Girl (1916/1917) and Doing Our Bit (1917/1918). Tinney also recorded for Columbia Records; the appropriately titled "Frank Tinney's First Record" (Columbia 1854), consisting of jokes and Tinney arguing with Columbia's musical director Charles A. Prince, became a hit in early 1916.

Tinney played himself as the central character in Tickle Me, a popular musical comedy that had a long run on Broadway and in subsequent tours between August 1919 and April 1922. Tinney opened the play with a skit playing his well-known blackface character, then assumed the role of a Hollywood studio property manager. Afterward, Tinney dropped blackface from his acts. His last major Broadway hit was the Music Box Revue that had a run of 273 performances between September 1923 and May 1924.

Tinney appeared in at least two motion pictures: The Governor's Boss (1915) with former New York governor William Sulzer and Broadway After Dark (1924), starring Adolphe Menjou, Norma Shearer and Anna Q. Nilsson.

== Personal life ==
=== Marriage and children ===
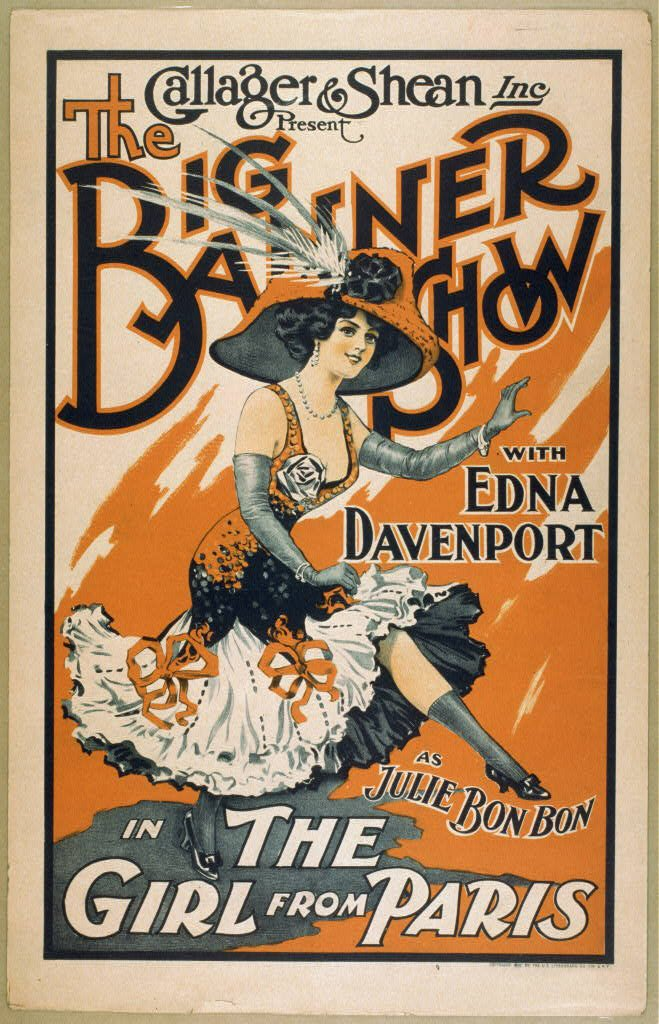
Illustration of Edna Davenport

On August 17, 1913, Tinney married Edna Davenport in a ceremony held at Hempstead, Long Island. Davenport was a singer and dancer who had appeared on vaudeville and burlesque stages in shows like The Girl in the Moulin Rouge (1899), A Scotch Highball (1905), Kernan and Rife’s Baltimore Beauties (1906) and Galliger and Shean's The Girl From Paris (1910). She was the daughter of Millie Davenport, a one-time vaudeville star and later Broadway wardrobe supervisor, and a sister of Stella Jones, then known on the vaudeville stage as the Spanish dancer La Estrellita.

Their son, Frank, Jr., was born in January 1918. He later appeared in the 1933 Cecil B. DeMille film This Day and Age, along with the namesake sons of actors Eric von Stroheim, Wallace Reid, Bryant Washburn, Carlyle Blackwell, Neal Hart and Fred Kohler. Tinney’s son later became an officer in the U.S. Air Force, and he saw service during World War II, Korean War, and Vietnam War.

=== Affair with Imogene Wilson ===
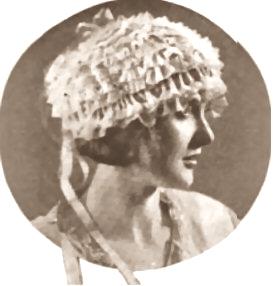
Imogene Wilson in The Delineator (vol. 101, 1922)

On the night of May 29, 1924, Tinney was arrested at his home in Baldwin, Long Island and later transferred to Manhattan to face charges of brutally assaulting Ziegfeld Follies dancer Imogene Wilson. Earlier, Wilson had appeared before New York City Magistrate Thomas McAndrews covered in bruises, claiming Tinney had attacked her after discovering her alone in her apartment with a newspaper reporter. Despite the physical evidence, a month later a grand jury refused to indict Tinney, apparently agreeing with his lawyer’s assessment that the incident was nothing more than a publicity stunt by Wilson.

Davenport filed for divorce on August 6, 1924, the same day Tinney sailed for England and some hours after an early morning incident in which he destroyed the camera of a press photographer attempting to take a picture of Tinney and Wilson as they were leaving a New York night spot. Wilson later had to be escorted off Tinney's passenger ship after ignoring the captain’s final All Ashore Who’s Going Ashore warning. She eventually followed Tinney to London, where the two resumed their abusive affair until Wilson was lured away with an offer to perform in German motion pictures. In 1941, Wilson described her affair with Tinney, that she said began when she was age 14 as a "nonsensical mixture of fights and laughs, and half and half."

== Later life ==
When Tinney returned to New York in 1925, he found that many of his friends had deserted him and that his popularity with the theater-going public had waned. His attempts to salvage his marriage eventually had come to naught by March 1926. Around this time, Tinney began to experience a series of health issues that began with complication from broken ribs suffered in a fall and a later nervous breakdown, greatly hindering his attempts at a comeback. By 1930, Tinney was home in Philadelphia living with his father, his career virtually over.

== Death ==
Tinney died on November 28, 1940, of a pulmonary condition after a long stay at Veterans Hospital in Northport, Long Island. During his peak years, Tinney could command up to $1,500 per week from producers for his popular act. By the time of his death, Tinney’s wealth had disappeared, drained away by a divorce settlement, lawyers' fees, and medical bills.

Tinney had served as a captain with the Army Quartermaster Corps during World War I and was accorded a military funeral at Holy Cross Cemetery, Yeadon, Pennsylvania.
