= Strážný =

- Market town
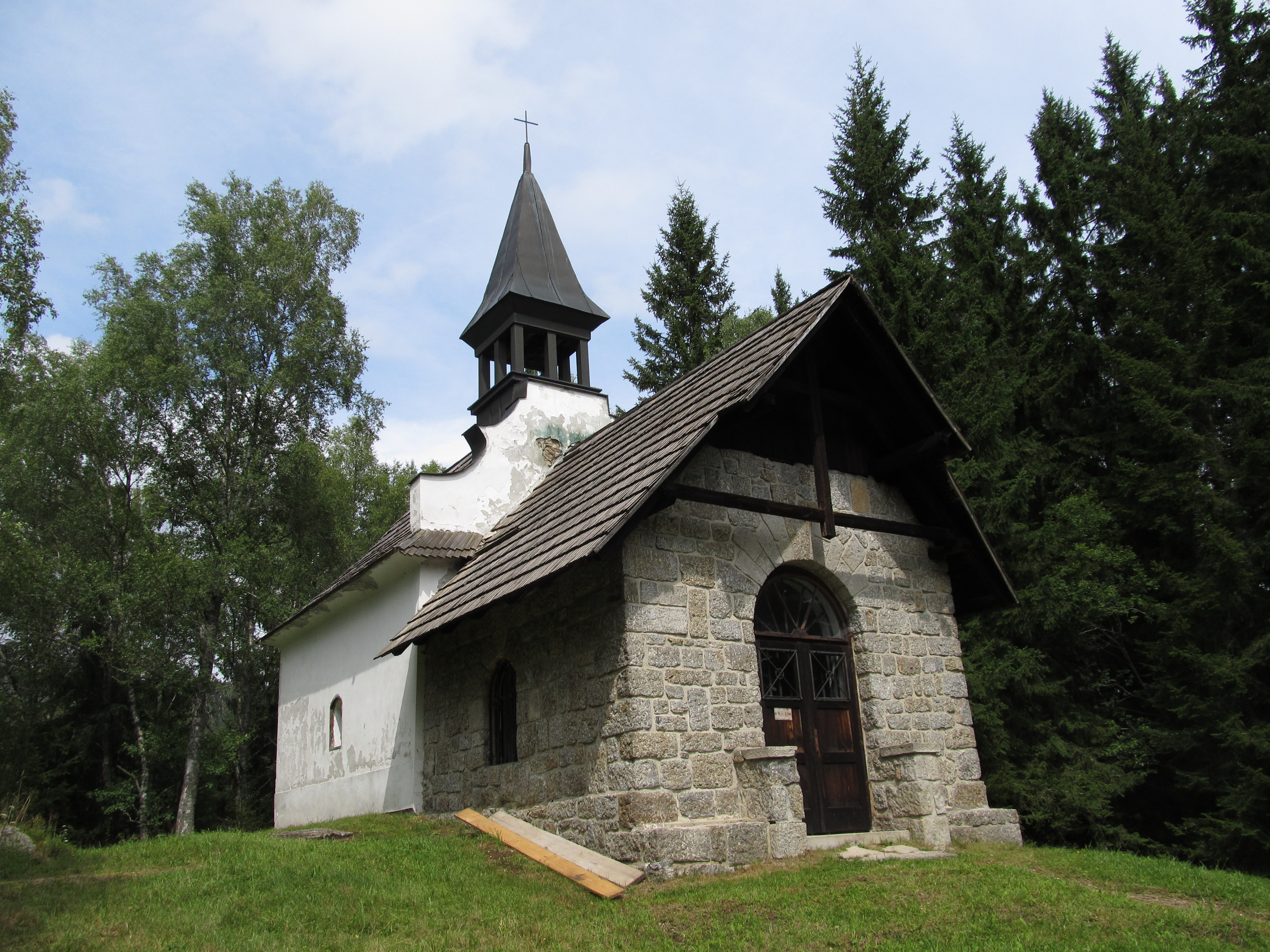
- Chapel of the Virgin Mary

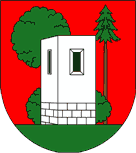
- Flag Coat of arms

- Location in the Czech Republic
- Coordinates: 48°54′32″N 13°43′13″E
- Country: Czech Republic
- Region: South Bohemian
- District: Prachatice
- First mentioned: 1359

Area
  - Total: 49.65 km^{2} (19.17 sq mi)
- Elevation: 834 m (2,736 ft)

Population (2026-01-01)
  - Total: 405
  - Density: 8.16/km^{2} (21.1/sq mi)
- Time zone: UTC+1 (CET)
  - Summer (DST): UTC+2 (CEST)
- Postal code: 384 43
- Website: www.strazny.cz

Strážný (Czech pronunciation: [ˈstraːʒniː]; until 1955 Kunžvart; German: Kuschwarda) is a market town in Prachatice District in the South Bohemian Region of the Czech Republic. It has about 400 inhabitants.

== Administrative division ==
Strážný consists of four municipal parts (in brackets population according to the 2021 census):

- Strážný (327)
- Hliniště (18)
- Kořenný (8)
- Řasnice (32)

== Geography ==
Strážný is located about 23 kilometres (14 mi) southwest of Prachatice and 55 km (34 mi) west of České Budějovice, on the border with Germany. It lies in the Bohemian Forest; most of the territory lies in the Šumava National Park and a smaller part lies in the Šumava Protected Landscape Area. The highest point is the Strážný mountain at 1,115 m (3,658 ft) above sea level, but there are also several other mountains above 1,000 m.

Two tributaries of the Vltava river, Řasnice and Častá, flow through the territory. The built-up area is located in the valley of the Častá, below the Strážný mountain.

== History ==
The first written mention of Strážný, then named Kunžvart, is from 1359, when existence of a castle on the Strážný mountain is documented. For 200 years it served to protect an important trade route and border of the Kingdom of Bohemia. Since 1547, the castle was uninhabited, and during the 16th century, it became a ruin.

In 1689, a settlement was founded near the castle and named Kunžvart after the castle. The new village grew rapidly and already in 1833, the international road from Prague to Passau passed through here and one of the first bus lines in the country was in operation. In 1844, the village was promoted to a market town.

After World War II, the German population was expelled.

== Demographics ==
Historical population

Year	Pop.	±%
1869	2,703	—
1880	2,919	+8.0%
1890	2,730	−6.5%
1900	2,448	−10.3%
1910	2,391	−2.3%

Year	Pop.	±%
1921	2,271	−5.0%
1930	2,182	−3.9%
1950	245	−88.8%
1961	247	+0.8%
1970	312	+26.3%

Year	Pop.	±%
1980	299	−4.2%
1991	279	−6.7%
2001	285	+2.2%
2011	457	+60.4%
2021	385	−15.8%

Source: Censuses

== Transport ==
On the Czech–German border is the Strážný / Philippsreut road border crossing.

== Sport ==
In Strážný is the Ski Resort Strážný.

== Sights ==
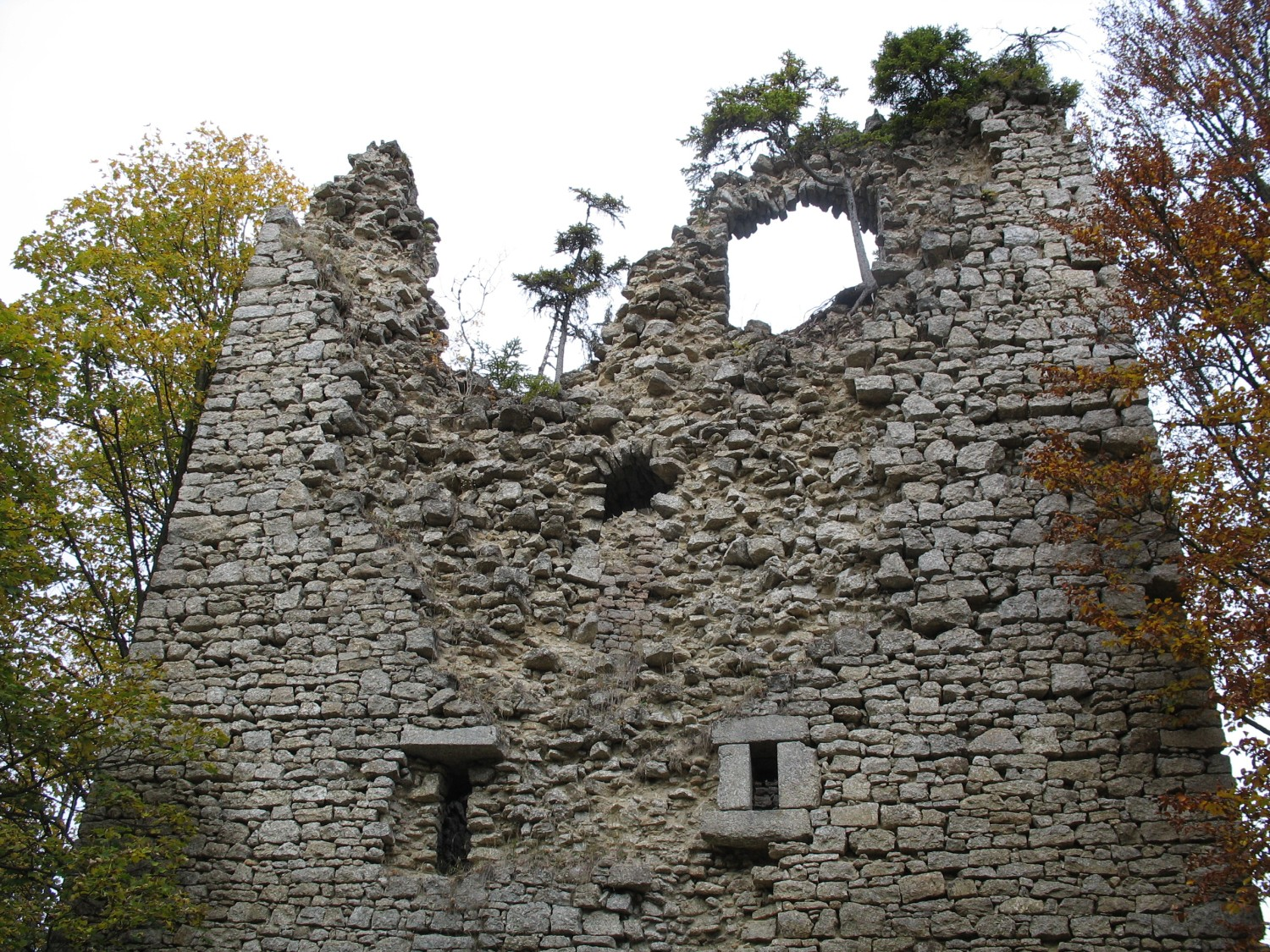
Kunžvart Castle

The ruin of Kunžvart Castle in open to the public. It is located below the top of the Strážný mountain in an altitude of 1,033 metres (3,389 ft), which makes it one of the highest placed castles in the country.

The Chapel of the Virgin Mary was built in 1834. It is accessible only once a year during Mass.

The most valuable building was the Church of the Holy Trinity from 1780. In 1965, it was demolished and the cemetery was moved. Today there is a place of reverence with a stone ground plan of the church on the site of the cemetery and a model of the church.

== Notable people ==
- Karl Hoschna (1876–1911), Austrian-American musician and composer
