= Something in Her Eye =

1915 film

- Starring: Oliver Hardy
- Release date: November 10, 1915
- Running time: 8 minutes
- Country: United States
- Languages: Silent film English intertitles

Something in Her Eye is a 1915 American silent comedy film featuring Oliver Hardy. It is the best-preserved example of Hardy's work because a pristine copy was found in a basement in England in 1984 and given to the National Film Archive. Although Billie Rhodes was listed as being in the film, experts concluded that she isn't there and another person plays her part, perhaps a man dressed as a woman. A question mark under her eye adds to the mystery.

== Plot ==
This plot summary was published in The Moving Picture World for November 13, 1915:

Trixie Gale, passing a house where bricklayers are at work, gets some of the dry mortar dust in her eye. Stopping to do a little marketing, she winks spasmodically, but without any feminine designs, at the plump and susceptible groceryman who "falls for" Miss Trixie instantly. Still winking and blinkin™ the irritated eye, she continues homeward, quite innocently making conquests all the way. A certain count, lying in wait for American millions, forgets to inquire whether Trixie is an heiress, but, after receiving a single- ravishing wink, rushes after her, and then darts into a jeweler's shop, intending to make his declaration irresistible. Even the studious Horatio drops his books as Miss Gale flits past and starts on a run to the confectioner's.

The grocer, meanwhile, has loaded down with florist's boxes, and is staggering along the street in the direction of the Gale mansion. Trixie is expecting momentarily the arrival of her father, "Dead Line of Texas," a celebrated marksman. Each time the doorbell rings she thinks it is Papa. Presently the house is filled with suitors, all hiding from the crackshot parent. At last Papa arrives. He removes the irritating particle from daughter's eye, dinner is partaken of, and then Trixie insists that they go out. As they are leaving the house, Papa discovers the supposed "burglars." There is a grand shooting up, and Trixie's panic-stricken admirers flee. Miss Gale explains to her parent that said young men only came to propose. Papa rallies the suitors and bids them go to — the man who wins the bout gets Trixie. But Trixie already has made up her mind. She tips off the delighted groceryman — and while the count and Horatio are sparring heroically, refereed by Papa, the sweethearts make a clean getaway.

== Cast ==
- Unknown actor (not, as listed, Billie Rhodes) – Trixie Gale, the Girl with something in her eye (see note above)
- Oliver Hardy – The Grocer (as Babe Hardy)

== See also ==
- List of American films of 1915
