= Every Little Movement (Has a Meaning All Its Own) =

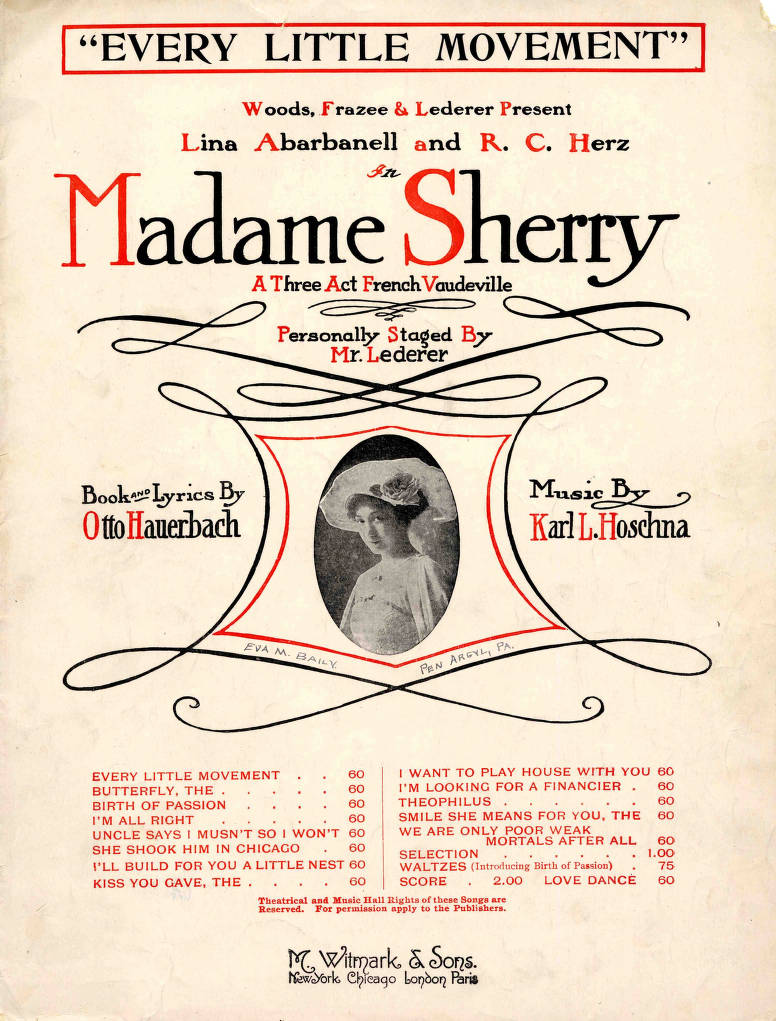
Sheet music cover, 1910

"Every Little Movement (Has a Meaning All Its Own)" is a popular song. Its music was written by Karl Hoschna and its lyrics by Otto Harbach for their musical, Madame Sherry, which opened on Broadway on August 30, 1910. The song was sung in the musical by Frances Demarest and John Reinhard.

Popular recordings in 1910 were by Harry Macdonough and Lucy Isabelle Marsh, and by Henry Burr and Elise Stevenson. Marie Lloyd sang a parody of it in British music halls just before the World War I.

Since its publication, the song has become a standard, recorded by many artists, including Doris Day, Peggy Lee and by The Platters.

An instrumental version was heard on the soundtrack of The Jolson Story.

Judy Garland and Connie Gilchrist (dubbed by Mary Kent) sang it in the 1943 film Presenting Lily Mars, and Peggy Cummins sang and hummed it in the 1947 film, The Late George Apley, based upon the Pulitzer Prize-winning John P. Marquand novel of 1912 Boston.

The song was sung in 1957 by Polly Bergen on her eponymous NBC variety show and by Ann Morgan Guilbert on an episode of The Dick Van Dyke Show called "The Gunslinger".

In Rick Besoyan's satirical 1959 musical Little Mary Sunshine, the song is parodied in the song "Every Little Nothing", which employs the same first five notes and mentions the song by name.

"Every Little Movement"
Chorus of the song
