= Dolly Connolly =

Singer and vaudeville performer (1888–1965)

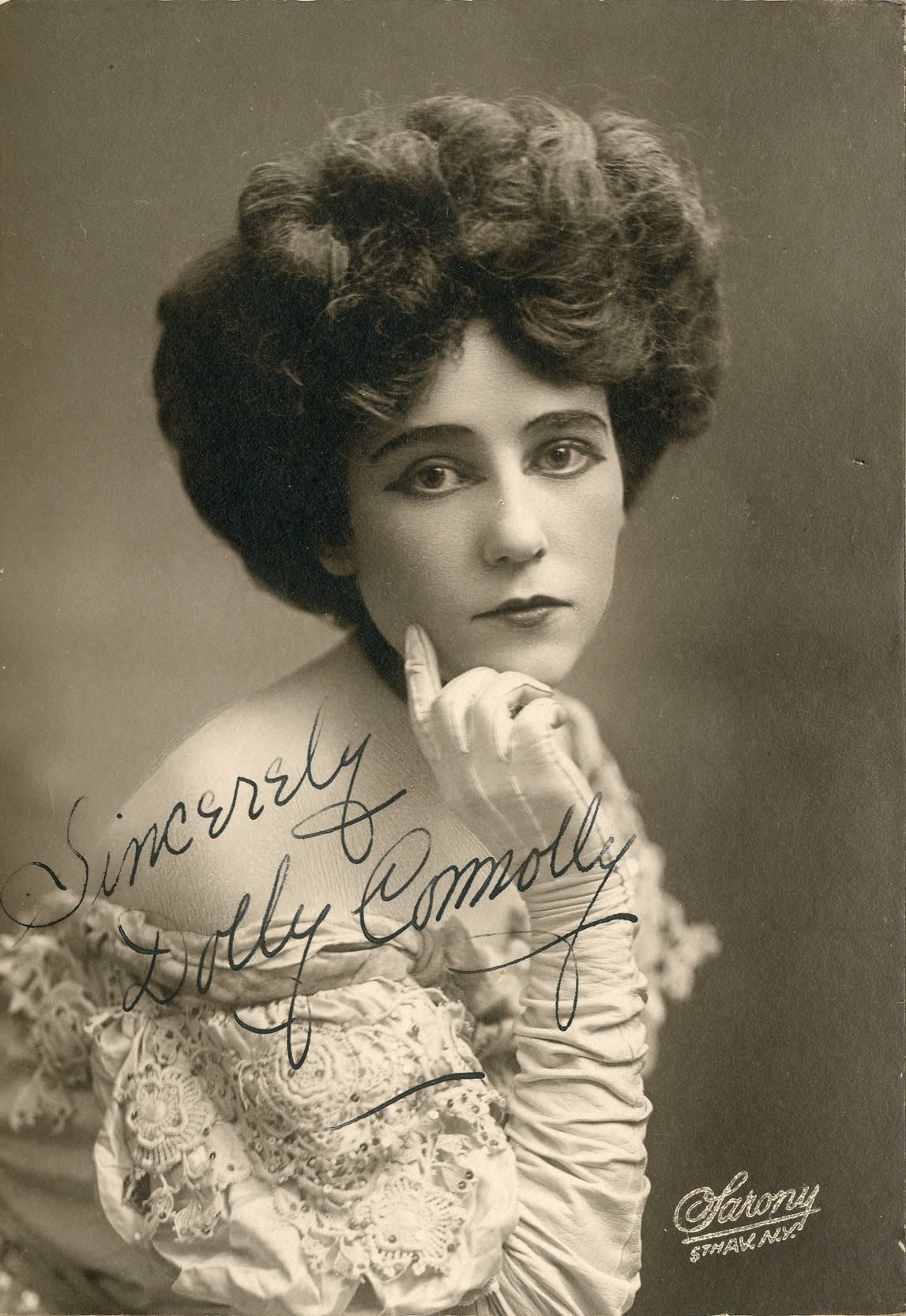
- Born: December 16, 1888
- Died: November 30, 1965
- Occupation(s): Singer, vaudeville performer
- Spouse: Percy Wenrich

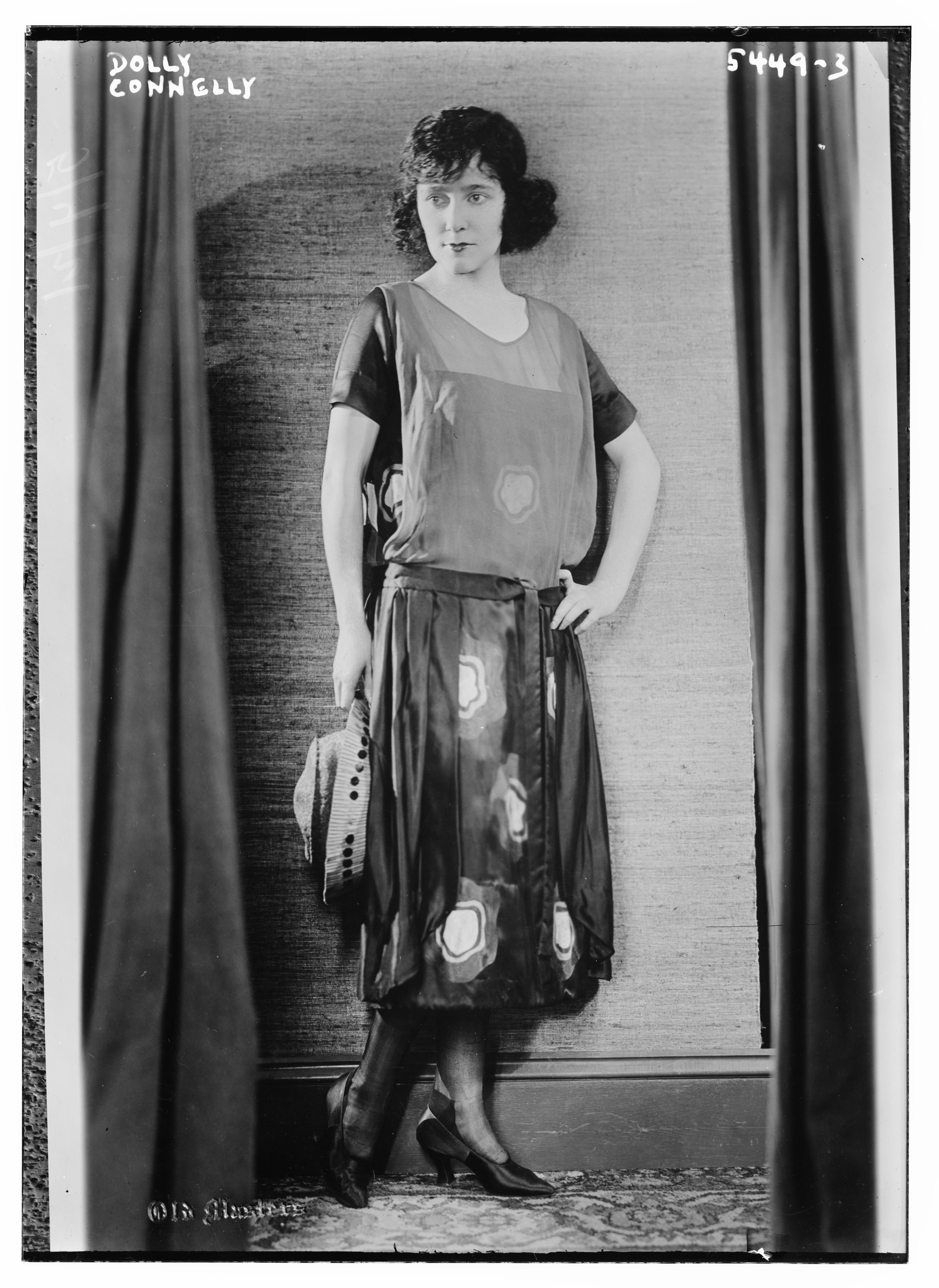

Dolly Connolly (December 16, 1888 – November 30, 1965) was a performer in vaudeville and musicals in the United States. She married composer and pianist Percy Wenrich. They were headliners in major vaudeville circuits. She recorded on Columbia Records and recorded a duet on Victor Records.

According to the copyright she wrote the words to "I'm Lonesome for Someone Who Loves Me". She performed "Red Rose Rag", "Moonlight Bay", and "Alamo Rag" on tour accompanied by her composer husband. Songs she recorded include "Waiting for the Robert E. Lee". The music for "When You Wore a Tulip and I Wore a Big Red Rose" sold more than two million copies. In 1928 she was filmed performing various of Wenrich's songs for Vitaphone.

She was considered beautiful and posed provocatively in some photos. She also modeled gowns for Dramatic Mirror. Cross-dresser Julian Eltinge appeared on a sheet music parody of the couple's sheet music; Eltinge was pictured instead of Connolly.

She appeared in The Passing Show of 1917 and in 1921 in The Right Girl.

She was in a sanitarium from 1947 to Wenrich's death in 1952. She then lived with her sister until her death in 1965.

== Discography ==
- "The Hypnotizing Man" (1912)
- "Honey Man" / "Oh That Navajo Rag"
