= Billie Rhodes =

American actress

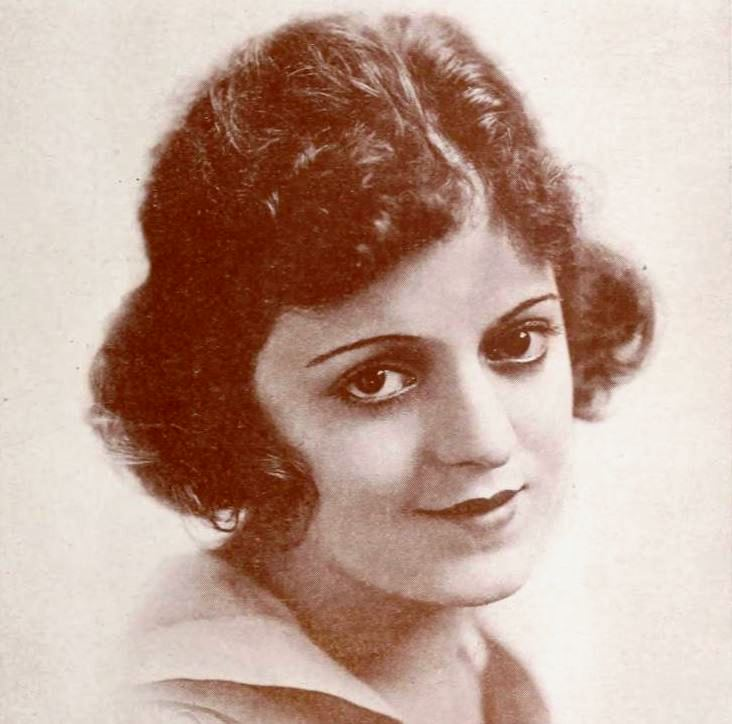
- Billie Rhodes in 1918
- Born: Levita Axelrod; August 15, 1894; San Francisco, California, U.S.
- Died: March 12, 1988 (aged 93); Los Angeles, California, U.S.
- Occupation: Actress
- Years active: 1913–1925 (film)
- Spouse(s): William Parsons (m.1919; his death); G. Pat Collins (m.1927–1959; his death)

Billie Rhodes (born Levita Axelrod, 1894–1988) was an American actress who appeared in nearly 200 films.

== Biography ==
Born in San Francisco, Rhodes starting her acting career with the Morrison Stock Company, a local theatre troupe. She was originally discovered by Kalem Company, who gave her a one-year contract in 1913. She primarily acted in comedic shorts, but also acted in the drama Perils at Sea. After her contract ended, she began singing in nightclubs, and was approached by Al Christie, then working for the Nestor Film Company. She was signed and made weekly "polite" comedic shorts through the next year.

In September 1916, Christie began his own production studio, the Christie Film Company, and recruited Rhodes. She starred in A Seminary Scandal, Christie's first independent production, then went on to act opposite Jay Belasco in a series of clean comedies. In 1918, moved from shorts to feature-length films after being convinced by William "Smiling Bill" Parsons, who became her husband in early 1919. Her acting jobs in 1919 included two starring roles in the same month: Hoop-La and The Lamb and the Lion.

After Parsons died suddenly in September 1919, Rhodes continued to make movies, but at a slower rate, and her films after 1919 were considered to be commercial failures. By the time she married G. Pat Collins in 1927, she had retired from acting and returned to theater acting and nightclub entertaining until her death in 1988 at the age of 93.

== Selected filmography ==
The selected filmography includes feature films by Rhodes.

- Perils at Sea (1913)
- Something in Her Eye (1915) (note that she is listed, but experts think someone else actually plays the part, per The Laurel and Hardy Encyclopedia).
- Wanted: A Leading Lady (1915)
- Seminary Scandal (1916)
- The Girl of My Dreams (1918)
- The Blue Bonnet (1919)
- Hoop-La (1919)
- The Lamb and the Lion (1919)
- In Search of Arcady (1919)
- The Love Call (1919)
- Miss Nobody (1920)
- His Pajama Girl (1920)
- The Star Reporter (1921)
- Fires Of Youth (1924)
- Leave It to Gerry (1924)
