= Percy Wenrich =

American ragtime composer (1880–1952)

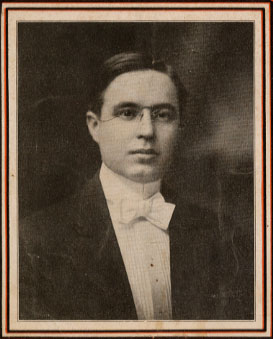

Background information
- Born: January 23, 1880; Joplin, Missouri
- Died: March 17, 1952 (aged 72) New York City
- Occupation: Composer
- Instrument: Piano
- Years active: 1907–1937

Percy Wenrich (January 23, 1880 – March 17, 1952) was an American composer of ragtime and popular music. He is best known for writing the songs "Put on Your Old Grey Bonnet" and "When You Wore a Tulip and I Wore a Big Red Rose", along with the rag "The Smiler". For more than 15 years, Wenrich toured with his wife, vaudeville performer, Dolly Connolly; for whom he wrote several hit songs, including "Red Rose Rag", "Alamo Rag" and "Moonlight Bay". He was known throughout his lifetime as "The Joplin Kid".

== Personal life and career ==
Percy Wenrich was born in Joplin, Missouri to Daniel Wenrich and Mary Ray (née). Although various documents differ in their claims of Wenrich's birth date, an 1880 census lists January 1880. Raised in southwest Missouri, Wenrich was heavily influenced by classic and folk ragtime. His mother, known as "the Berry County pianist", provided Wenrich with his first piano and organ lessons. By his teenage years, Wenrich was composing his own tunes; for which his father supplied the lyrics. Some of which were even used in the local political scene. In a September 1949 issue of Billboard Magazine, it was noted that Wenrich's songs "eulogized such Democratic stalwarts as Grover Cleveland and William Jennings Bryan, and were sung at political rallies and conventions by glee clubs organized on the spots." During this time, Wenrich joined a local minstrel group, where he began to learn cakewalks and ragtime melodies. On account of this, he became known as "The Joplin Kid". He published his first musical work at age 17 titled L’Inconnu, which Wenrich called "a two-step with a fancy title."

In 1901, Wenrich left for Chicago where he attended classes at the Chicago Musical College, run by Florenz Ziegfeld Sr. He continued to study organ with Louis Falk. Wenrich began working for the McKinley Music Company as a melody writer; as well as at Gimbel's Department Store selling sheet music. In 1903, Wenrich began writing ragtime works, the first of which was titled "Ashy Africa". Several other rags followed, including "Peaches and Cream" (1905), "Persian Lamb Rag" (1908), "Ragtime Chimes" (1912); but it was "The Smiler" (1907), subtitled "A Joplin Rag", which became his best-selling rag without lyrics.

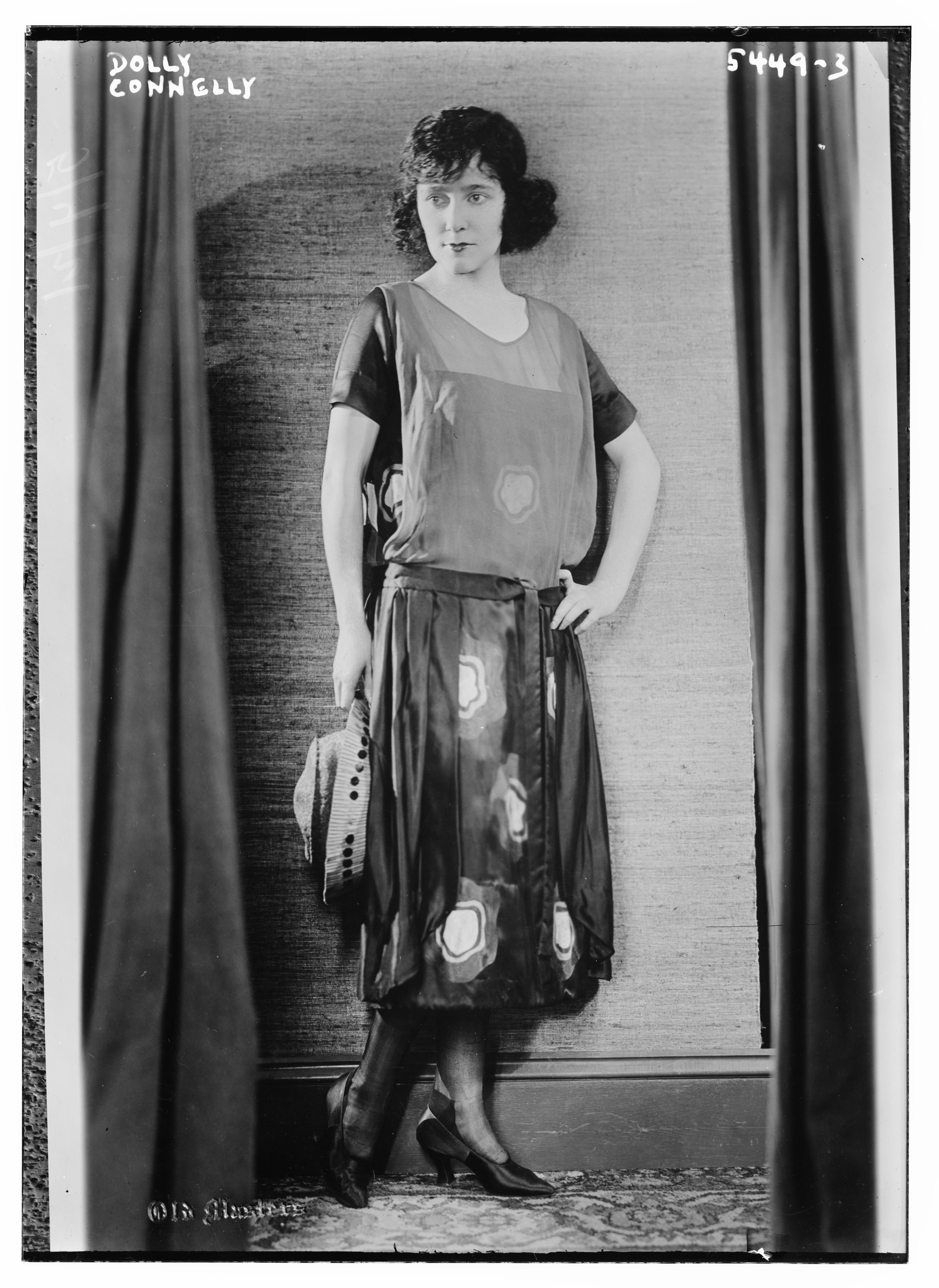
Wenrich's wife and vaudeville performer Dolly Connolly c. 1921

In 1905, Wenrich met vaudeville performer Dolly Connolly. They married on July 3, 1906. With funds acquired from his hit song "Come Be My Rainbow", the couple moved to New York City around 1909. While in New York, Wenrich wrote a string of hit tunes including "Put on Your Old Grey Bonnet", "That Alamo Rag" and "Moonlight Bay", which he wrote especially for Connolly. Wenrich recalled writing the tune in Atlantic City, New Jersey: "It was a swell night, with the moon streaming over the ocean. Just as I ordered another beer I thought I heard some guy ask the orchestra to play a piece called 'Moonlight Bay.' I was mistaken; they hadn't requested it, for the reason there was no such song, but I got to thinking what a swell title it would make and went home to work it." Wenrich also wrote the hit song "Red Rose Rag" in 1911 for Connolly with lyrics by Edward Madden. Actor and comedian George Burns performed "Red Rose Rag" throughout his career. In 1907, Wenrich wrote the song "Rainbow", which sold over a million copies.

In 1913, Wenrich started his own music publishing firm with businessman Homer Howard located at 1412 Broadway in New York. Together they published a few hits, including "Whipped Cream Rag" and "Snow Deer". It was while working at Leo Feist Publishing that he wrote one of his biggest selling songs, "When You Wore a Tulip and I Wore a Big Red Rose". It sold over two million copies. In 1914, Wenrich dissolved his music publishing firm to devote his time exclusively to writing and performing with Connolly; accompanying her as a recording star with Columbia Records. A review in the 1916 Toronto World wrote of the pair: "Decided favorites in their offerings of new songs, written by Percy Wenrich, were Dolly Connolly and the composer himself. A number sung for the first time in Toronto, 'Sweet Cider [Time],' which is both catchy and musical, proved the 'hit' of the performance. Composer and singer had to respond to several recalls and an encore was insisted upon…”

In the early 1920s, Wenrich and Connolly moved to The Lambs Club on West 44th Street in Manhattan. There Wenrich wrote the musical Maid to Love with Raymond Peck. Due to its poor reception, the team wrote a new story, retained most of the songs, and renamed it The Right Girl, starring Connolly. It was reviewed in the New York Times on March 16, 1921: "Percy Wenrich's score as several high spots – 'Love's little Journey' was good for half a dozen encores last night, and there were several other numbers to set the feet tapping. Dolly Connolly, come from vaudeville, sang several of the best numbers vivaciously…" Wenrich and Peck followed their success with two more musicals: Some Party in 1922 and Castles in the Air in 1926. Neither included Connolly.

Wenrich and several of his colleagues formed a sensational review called "Songwriters on Parade", performing all across the Eastern seaboard on the Loew's and Keith circuits between 1931 and 1940. Wenrich and Connolly retired from touring together in the early 1930s. The couple appeared briefly on WEAF radio in New York between 1930 and 1932. In 1934, they moved to California. Wenrich's last memorable song "Sail Along, Silv'ry Moon" was published in 1937. In 1947, due to mental health deterioration, Wenrich committed Connolly to a sanatorium. A 1950 census lists her as a patient in the Central Islip Mental Hospital in Suffolk County, New York. She was awarded care of her sister after Wenrich's death until she died in 1965 at age 77.

In 1951, Wenrich's popularity was rediscovered with the Warner Bros. film On Moonlight Bay, starring Doris Day. To celebrate Wenrich, the film studio premiered the film on July 27, 1951, at the Paramount Theater in Joplin, Missouri. As a highlight, Mayor H. Chris Oltman issued a proclamation designating "Put on Your Old Grey Bonnet" as Joplin's official song. Due to illness, Wenrich did not attend the premiere. In their 1951 newsletter, the Lambs Club wrote of Wenrich: "He's not bitter, the Joplin Kid. He’s not the type. He’s had a grand life, a full life; he’s made people happy and they’ve been good to him and what else is there? His eyes still sparkle when he talks to showfolks and his memories keep him young. The Joplin Kid has indeed walked with kings without losing the common touch, and in this bebop-reefer-happy-dust era, it’s inspiring to visit a Brother Lamb like Percy Wenrich; there are so very few of them left. We hope Percy will be around a long, long time.”

Wenrich died in New York City in 1952 at the age of 72. He is buried in the Fairview Cemetery in Joplin, Missouri. He was a founding member of the American Society of Composers, Authors and Publishers.

== Theater ==
Show	Year	Theater	Lyrics
Who Cares	July 8, 1930 – August 1930	Chanin's 46th Street Theatre	Harry Clarke
Castles in the Air	September 6, 1926 – December (?) 1926	Selwyn Theatre	Raymond W. Peck
Castles in the Air	December 6, 1926 – January 22, 1927	Century Theatre	Raymond W. Peck
Some Party	April 15, 1922 – April 29, 1922	Jolson's 59th Street Theatre	R.H. Burnside
The Greenwich Village Follies [1921]	August 31, 1921 – January 21, 1922	Shubert Theatre	Arthur Swanstrom
The Right Girl	March 15, 1921 – June 4, 1921	Times Square Theatre	Raymond Peck
Everything	August 22, 1918 – May 17, 1919	Hippodrome Theatre	R.H. Burnside
Hitchy-Koo (1918)	June 6, 1918 – August 3, 1918	Globe Theatre	Henry Marshall
Cousin Lucy	August 27, 1915 – October 2, 1915	George M. Cohan's Theatre	Edward Madden
The Crinoline Girl	March 16, 1914 – May 30, 1914	Knickerbocker Theatre	Julian Eltinge
The Crinoline Girl	December 14, 1914 – December (?) 1914)	Standard Theatre	Julian Eltinge

== Ragtime works ==
- "L’Inconnu" – Two Step (1897) Frank K. Root & Co.
- "Ashy Africa" – Rag (1903) Frank K. Root & Co.
- "Wenonah" – Intermezzo (1903) Whitney-Warner Publishing Co.
- "The Chicago Express" – March & Two-Step (1905) McKinley Music Co.
- "Peaches and Cream" – Rag (1905) Jerome H. Remick & Co.
- "Chestnuts" – Rag (1906) Arnett-Delonais Co.
- "Dixie Blossoms" – Two-Step (1906) Jerome H. Remick & Co
- "Noodles" – Rag (1906) Arnett-Delonais Co.
- "Flower Girl" – March & Two-Step (1907) Arnett-Delonais Co.
- "Fun-Bob" – Rag (1907) Arnett-Delonais Co.
- "George Jingles" – Two Step (1907) McKinley Music Co.
- "The Smiler" – Rag (1907) F.J.A. Forster Music Publisher
- "Sweetmeats" – Rag Two-Step (1907) Arnett-Delonais Co.
- "Tom Boy" – Rag-March & Two-Step (1907) Arnett-Delonais Co.
- "Blushes" – Novelette (1908) F.B. Haviland Publishing Company
- "Crab Apples" – Rag (1908) Brehm Bros
- "Dixie Kicks" – Rag (1908) McKinley Music Co.
- "Happy Hours" – Barn Dance (1908) Brehm Bros.
- "The Memphis Rag" – Two-Step (1908) McKinley Music Co.
- "Persian Lamb Rag" – Rag (1908) Walter Jacobs
- "Rainbow" – Intermezzo (1908) Jerome H. Remick & Co.
- "Ragtime Ripples" – (1908) McKinley Music Co.
- "Sunflower Tickle" – Rag (1908) McKinley Music Co.
- "Wild West" – Intermezzo (1908) McKinley Music Co.
- "Auto Race" – March & Two-Step (1909) McKinley Music Co.
- "Westward, Ho!" – March & Two-Step (1909) McKinley Music Co.
- "Egyptian Rag" – Rag (1910) Jerome H. Remick & Co.
- "Roosevelt March" – March (1910) McKinley Music Co.
- "Catnip" – Two-Step (1911) Frank K. Root & Co.
- "Dancing Wavelets" – Waltz (1911) Frank K. Root & Co.
- "Irish Beauties" – Two-Step (1911) Frank K. Root & Co.
- "Silver Leaf Waltz" – Waltz (1911) McKinley Music Co.
- "Sunflower Rag" – Rag (1911) Jerome H. Remick & Co.
- "Rag Time Chimes" – Novelty (1912) Jerome H. Remick & Co.
- "Pennant Rag" – Two-Step (1913) Charles I. Davis Music Publishing
- "Whipped Cream Rag" – Rag (1913) Wenrich-Howard Music Publishers
- "The Weeping Willow" – One-Step (1914) Wenrich-Howard Music Publishers
- "Steeple-Chase Fox-Trot" (1916) McKinley Music Co.

== Notable songs ==
Title	Year	Lyricist	Publisher
"Because I'm From Missouri"	1904	Percy Wenrich	Frank K. Root & Co.
"Under the Tropical Moon"	1907	C.P. McDonald	Victor Kremer Co.
"Come Be My Rainbow"	1908	Alfred Bryan	Jerome H. Remick & Co
"If It's Good Enough For Washington, It's Good Enough For Me"	1908	Ren Shields	Jerome H. Remick & Co.
"Up in My Balloon"	1908	Ren Shields	Jerome H. Remick & Co.
"Dixie Darlings"	1909	Arthur Gillespie	Frank K. Root & Co.
"Put on Your Old Grey Bonnet"	1909	Stanley Murphy	Jerome H. Remick & Co.
"Alamo Rag"	1910	Ben Deely	Jerome H. Remick & Co
"I'll Meet You When the Sun Goes Down"	1910	Percy Wenrich	Jerome H. Remick & Co.
"My Hula-Hula Love"	1911	Edward Madden	Jerome H. Remick & Co.
"The Red Rose Rag"	1911	Edward Madden	Jerome H. Remick & Co.
"The Skeleton Rag"	1911	Edward Madden	Jerome H. Remick & Co.
"Rag Time Chimes (Songs)"	1912	Edward Madden	Jerome H. Remick & Co.
"Moonlight Bay"	1912	Edward Madden	Jerome H. Remick & Co.
"Ragtime College Turkey Trot"	1913	Jack Mahoney	Wenrich-Howard Music Publishers
"When You Wore a Tulip and I Wore a Big Red Rose"	1914	Jack Mahoney	Leo Feist
"Silver Bay"	1916	Percy Wenrich	Leo Feist
"Sweet Cider Time, When You Were Mine!"	1916	Joseph McCarthy	Leo Feist
"Where Do We Go From Here?"	1917	Howard E. Johnson	Leo Feist
"All Muddled Up"	1922	Percy Wenrich	Leo Feist
"Keep On Building Castles in the Air"	1922	Raymond W. Peck	Foster Music Publisher Inc
"Love's Telephone"	1922	Percy Wenrich	Foster Music Publisher Inc
"Lindy Lady"	1923	Percy Wenrich	Leo Feist
"Sail Along, Silv'ry Moon"	1937	Harry Tobias	Select Music Publications

== See also ==
- List of ragtime composers
