= Otto Harbach =

American lyricist and librettist (1873–1963)

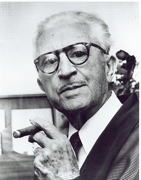
- Harbach

Background information
- Born: Otto Abels Hauerbach; August 18, 1873; Salt Lake City, Utah, U.S.
- Died: January 24, 1963 (aged 89) New York City, New York, U.S.
- Occupations: Lyricist, librettist
- Years active: 1902-1936

Otto Abels Harbach, born Otto Abels Hauerbach (August 18, 1873 – January 24, 1963) was an American lyricist and librettist of nearly 50 musical comedies and operettas. Harbach collaborated as lyricist or librettist with many of the leading Broadway composers of the early 20th century, including Jerome Kern, Louis Hirsch, Herbert Stothart, Vincent Youmans, George Gershwin, and Sigmund Romberg.

Harbach believed that music, lyrics, and story should be closely connected and, as Oscar Hammerstein II's mentor, he encouraged Hammerstein to write musicals in this manner. Harbach is considered one of the first great Broadway lyricists, and he helped raise the status of the lyricist in an age more concerned with music, spectacle, and stars. Some of his more famous lyrics are "Smoke Gets in Your Eyes", "Indian Love Call" and "Cuddle up a Little Closer, Lovey Mine".

== Biography ==
=== Early life and education ===
Otto Abels Hauerbach was born on August 18, 1873, in Salt Lake City, Utah to Danish immigrant parents. His family's original surname was Christiansen, but shortly after settling in the United States near Salt Lake City in the 1830s, they took Hauerbach, the name of the farm on which they worked, as their new surname.

He attended the Salt Lake Collegiate Institute, transferring to Knox College, in Galesburg, Illinois. There he became a friend of poet Carl Sandburg, joined Phi Gamma Delta fraternity, and graduated in 1895. Knox has since named its 599-seat Harbach Theatre in his honor.

Hauerbach started his career teaching English and public speaking at Whitman College in Walla Walla, Washington. He intended to become an English professor and started graduate work at Columbia University in New York.

In the early 1900s, complaining of eye difficulties that made prolonged reading uncomfortable, he became a newspaper reporter. He also worked at various advertising agencies, at an insurance firm, as a copywriter in advertising, and later as a journalist. He had to withdraw from Columbia when he could not financially support himself.

=== Early career (1902–1911) ===
In 1902, he spotted an advertisement for a new Joe Weber and Lew Fields musical with a picture of star Fay Templeton. He had not been interested in theatre but more in literary classics. After seeing the show, he realized he liked the lighthearted genre.

That same year, he met composer Karl Hoschna. They wrote a comic opera together, The Daughter of the Desert, but no producer was interested in producing the work.

Harbach and Hoschna continued to collaborate, writing songs to be added into other Broadway shows. They received their first chance to have a complete show produced on Broadway when Isidore Witmark asked Hoschna, his employee, to serve as composer for a musical version of Mary McIntire Pacheco's play Incog. Hoschna asked Harbach to write the lyrics. With Witmark and Charles Dickson writing the libretto, the resulting show was Three Twins, which opened in 1908 and ran for 288 performances (Harbach was paid a hundred dollars for his work). The show starred Clifton Crawford. One of Hoschna and Harbach's songs for Three Twins, "Cuddle Up A Little Closer, Lovey Mine," became a popular hit.

Their next collaboration was Madame Sherry in 1910, an adaptation of a 1902 German operetta, which featured Jack Gardner in the lead role. Their score included the standard "Every Little Movement (Has a Meaning All Its Own)". Harbach and Hoschna's score was augmented with interpolations, including the popular hit "Put Your Arms Around Me, Honey" by Albert von Tilzer and Junie McCree. They would collaborate for four more shows until Hoschna died in 1911, aged 35.

=== Career (1912–1936) ===
Harbach's work with Hoschna had established his reputation as a competent Broadway lyricist and librettist. Producer Arthur Hammerstein asked Harbach in 1912 to serve as librettist for a new operetta called The Firefly, to be composed by Rudolf Friml. Harbach set his libretto in contemporary Manhattan and Bermuda, which differed from the typical European setting for operettas. The result was a huge success, with hits such as "Sympathy", "Giannina Mia", and "Love is Like a Firefly".

The success of The Firefly led to ten more musical collaborations for librettist Harbach, composer Friml, and producer Arthur Hammerstein, including High Jinks (1913) and Katinka (1915). Most of the shows Harbach and Friml wrote ran for more than 200 performances each, which was a successful run for the time period.

Harbach also worked on projects with other collaborators during this time. In 1914, he contributed the libretto only to the Percy Wenrich musical The Crinoline Girl. He collaborated with composer Louis Hirsch and scored his biggest success thus far in his career in 1917 with Going Up. This was his first attempt at a musical comedy, as opposed to an American operetta. The show was based on the 1910 comedy The Aviator by James Montgomery, who co-wrote the libretto with Harbach. The show ran for 351 performances, toured nationally, and was an even larger hit in London.

Also in 1917, he shortened his name from Hauerbach to Harbach, to avoid the anti-German sentiment caused by World War I. Harbach and Hirsch collaborated on another notable Broadway production in 1920, Mary.

Also around 1920, producer Arthur Hammerstein introduced his nephew Oscar Hammerstein II to Harbach. Oscar was an aspiring lyricist and book writer, and Harbach became his mentor. Harbach encouraged Oscar to treat writing for the musical theatre as a "serious art form." Together, they wrote book and lyrics for Tickle Me (1920), Jimmie (1920), Wildflower (1923), Rose-Marie (1924), Sunny (1925), Song of the Flame (1925), The Wild Rose (1926), The Desert Song (1926), Golden Dawn (1927), and Good Boy (1928).

Harbach and Hammerstein's operetta collaboration, Wildflower (1923), was Harbach's first work with composer Vincent Youmans. Harbach collaborated again with Youmans, as well as with co-lyricist Irving Caesar and co-librettist Frank Mandel on the 1925 hit musical comedy No, No, Nanette.

Harbach first collaborated with Broadway composer Jerome Kern on Sunny (1925). They continued to work together on subsequent musicals, including Criss Cross (1926), The Cat and the Fiddle (1931), and Roberta (1933).

Broadway historian Thomas S. Hischak states that Harbach's lyrics for Kern were the finest of his career. The Cat and the Fiddle was especially notable, as Harbach (writing both book and lyrics) and Kern wanted to create a modern operetta set in contemporary Brussels "in which music and story were indispensable to each other." Hits from The Cat and the Fiddle included "Try to Forget," "She Didn't Say Yes", "The Breeze Kissed Your Hair", and "The Night Was Made for Love". Roberta included the hits "Smoke Gets in Your Eyes", "Yesterdays", "You're Devastating", and "The Touch of Your Hand".

By the mid-1930s, Harbach's operetta-influenced style was no longer current on Broadway. His final major production was a collaboration with operetta composer Sigmund Romberg, Forbidden Melody (1936).

In addition to his musical collaborations, Harbach also wrote non-musical farce plays for the Broadway stage. These included Up in Mabel's Room (1919), for which he collaborated with new playwright Wilson Collison from Ohio.

== Impact and legacy ==
Harbach was one of the most prolific Broadway lyricist/librettists of the early 20th century. He collaborated as lyricist or librettist with many of the leading Broadway writers and composers of that era, including Oscar Hammerstein II, Jerome Kern, Louis Hirsch, Herbert Stothart, Vincent Youmans, George Gershwin, and Sigmund Romberg. He became a charter member of ASCAP in 1914, and he served as a director (1920–1963), vice president (1936–1940), and president (1950–1953). Harbach was also an inductee of the Songwriters Hall of Fame.

Harbach died at his home in New York City on January 24, 1963, aged 89.

== Personal life ==
In 1918, Harbach married Eloise Smith Dougall of Salt Lake City, Utah. The Harbachs had two sons, William O. Harbach (a television producer) and Robert Harbach (a writer).

== Notable songs ==
He was lyricist for many songs including:

- "Allah's Holiday"
- "Cuddle up a Little Closer, Lovey Mine"
- "Every Little Movement (Has a Meaning All Its Own)"
- "Giannina Mia"
- "Going Up"
- "I Won't Dance"
- "If You Look in Her Eyes"
- "Indian Love Call"
- "Love Is Like a Firefly"
- "One Alone"
- "Rackety Coo"
- "She Didn't Say Yes"
- "Smoke Gets in Your Eyes" (from 1933 musical Roberta)
- "Something Seems Tingle-Ingling"
- "Sympathy"
- "The Night Was Made For Love"
- "The Tickle Toe"
- "Yesterdays"
- "Who?" (from 1925 Broadway Musical Sunny)

== Works ==
- Early works
  - 1907 Three Twins (music Karl Hoschna)
  - 1909 Bright Eyes (music Hoschna)
  - 1910 Madame Sherry (music Hoschna)
  - 1911 Dr. De Luxe (music Hoschna)
  - 1911 The Girl of My Dreams (music Hoschna)
  - 1911 The Fascinating Widow (music Hoschna)
  - 1912 The Firefly (music Rudolf Friml)
  - 1913 High Jinks (music Friml)
  - 1914 The Crinoline Girl (music Percy Wenrich), lyrics Julian Eltinge) – book only
  - 1914 Suzi (music Aladar Renyi)
  - 1915 Katinka (music Friml)
  - 1916 The Silent Witness (play by Harbach)
  - 1916 A Pair of Queens (play by Harbach, A. Seymour Brown, and Harry Lewis)
  - 1917 You're in Love (music Friml)
  - 1917 Miss 1917 (revue)
  - 1917 Kitty Darlin' (music Friml)
  - 1917 Here's to the Two of You (music Louis Hirsch)
- Later works
  - 1918 Going Up (music Louis Hirsch)
  - 1919 Up in Mabel's Room, play, written with Wilson Collison
  - 1919 Tumble In (music Friml)
  - 1919 The Little Whopper (music Friml, lyrics with Bide Dudley)
  - 1920 No More Blondes, play by Harbach
  - 1920 Mary (music Hirsch)
  - 1920 Jimmie (music Herbert Stothart, lyrics Hammerstein II)
  - 1920 Tickle Me (music Stothart, lyrics Hammerstein II)
  - 1921 June Love (music Friml, lyrics Brian Hooker, book Harbach and William H. Post)
  - 1921 The O'Brien Girl (music Friml, lyrics Frank Mandel, and book Harbach and Mandel)
  - 1922 The Blue Kitten (music Friml, lyrics and book by Harbach and William Carey Duncan)
  - 1922 Molly Darling (music Tom Johnstone, lyrics Phil Cook, book by Harbach and Williams)
  - 1923 Wildflower (music Youmans and Stothart, lyrics Hammerstein II)
  - 1923 Jack and Jill (music Stothart)
  - 1923 Kid Boots (music Harry Tierney and lyrics Joseph McCarthy)
  - 1923 No, No, Nanette (music Vincent Youmans, lyrics with Irving Caesar)
  - 1924 Rose-Marie (music Friml, lyrics Hammerstein II)
  - 1925 Song of the Flame (music by George Gershwin and Stothart, lyrics Hammerstein II)
  - 1925 Sunny (music Jerome Kern, lyrics Hammerstein II)
  - 1926 Criss Cross (music Kern)
  - 1926 Oh, Please! (music Youmans)
  - 1926 The Wild Rose (music Friml)
  - 1926 The Desert Song (music Romberg)
  - 1927 Golden Dawn (music Emmerich Kalman and Stothart)
  - 1927 Lucky (music Kern)
  - 1928 Good Boy (music Stothart, lyrics Bert Kalmar and Harry Ruby)
  - 1930 Nina Rosa (music Romberg, lyrics Irving Caesar)
  - 1930 Ballyhoo of 1930 (featured lyricist)
  - 1931 The Cat and the Fiddle (music Kern)
  - 1933 Roberta (music Kern)
  - 1936 Forbidden Melody (music Sigmund Romberg)
  - 1938 Gentlemen Unafraid (music Kern, lyrics Hammerstein II)
