= Karl Hoschna =

Composer

Karl L. Hoschna
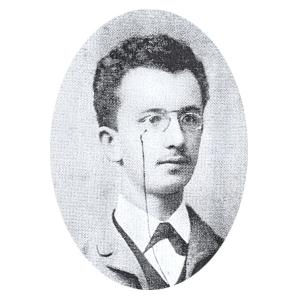
- Karl Hoschna circa 1900
- Born: August 16, 1876; Kuschwarda, Bohemia
- Died: December 23, 1911 (aged 35); New York City
- Resting place: Green-Wood Cemetery; 40°39′08″N 73°59′28″W
- Other names: Carl Hoschna
- Occupation: Songwriter
- Spouse: Hettie Hug

Karl Hoschna (1876–1911) was a Tin Pan Alley-era composer most noted for his songs "Cuddle up a Little Closer, Lovey Mine", "Every Little Movement" and "Yama Yama Man", and for a string of successful Broadway musicals.

== Early life ==
Hoschna was born on 16 August 1876 in Kuschwarda, Bohemia, and educated in Austria at the Vienna Conservatory of Music, specializing in the oboe. He graduated with honors and became an oboist in the Austrian army band. He emigrated to the United States in 1896 and joined the Victor Herbert orchestra as an oboe soloist.

== Career ==
Hoschna abandoned the oboe because he believed the vibration of the oboe's double-reed was affecting his mind, and became a copyist for the Witmark Music Publishing Co., where he selected songs for publication and was an arranger.

With Otto Harbach, Harry B. Smith, Charles Noel Douglas, Mark Swan, Benjamin Hapgood Burt, William C. Duncan, and others, he collaborated on a series of Broadway musical comedies, which included:

- 1905: Belle of the West
- 1905: The Daughter of the Desert
- 1907: The Girl from Broadway
- 1908: Three Twins, which provided Bessie McCoy ("The Yama Yama Girl") with her signature song "The Yama Yama Man", and introduced Cuddle Up A Little Closer.
- 1908: Prince Humbug
- 1909: The Silver Star
- 1910: Katy Did
- 1910: Bright Eyes
- 1910: The Echo, incorporated Hoschna's song "I Don't Want to Be a Soldier Boy"
- 1910: Madame Sherry, in which Every Little Movement was introduced.
- 1910: Get-Rich-Quick Wallingford (The main composer was George M. Cohan; Hoschna was represented by a selection from Madame Sherry)
- 1911: Jumping Jupiter
- 1911: Dr. De Luxe
- 1911: The Girl of My Dreams
- 1912: The Wall Street Girl

After his death, his music was used in:

- 1917: Miss 1917 (the song "Yama Yama Man", with lyrics by Collin Davis)
- 1980: Tintypes (the song "Electricity", with lyrics by Harry B. Smith)

Hoschna was inducted into Tin Pan Alley's Hall of Fame in 1908.

Hoschna died before completing the music for The Wall Street Girl, which featured Blanche Ring, her brother Cyril Ring, and Will Rogers, Jr.

Hoschna's popular songs include:

- "Bright Eyes"
- "Cuddle Up a Little Closer"
- "Girl of My Dreams"
- "Yama Yama Man"
- "Every Little Movement"
- "The Mood You're In"

== Personal life ==
Hoschna married Hettie Hug; they had three daughters.

Hoschna died on 23 December 1911 in New York City, leaving an estate of $6,424, and was buried 26 December 1911 at Green-Wood Cemetery in Brooklyn, New York.
