= Doris Day discography =

List of recordings

The following is a complete discography for American singer and actress Doris Day, whose entertainment career spanned nearly 50 years. She started her career as a big band singer in 1939 and gained popularity with her first hit recording, "Sentimental Journey", with Les Brown and His Band of Renown in 1945. In her solo career, she recorded more than 650 recordings on the Columbia Records label from 1947 to 1967. She was one of the most popular and acclaimed singers of the 20th century.

== Chart hits ==
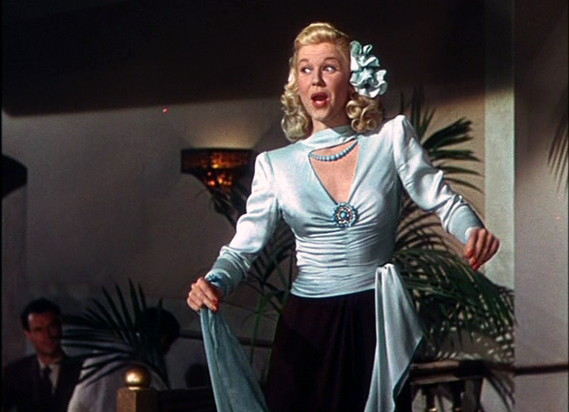
Romance on the High Seas (1948)

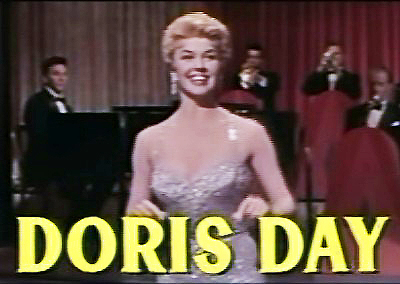
Love Me or Leave Me (1955)

Year	Title	Chart Positions		
Year	Title	US	CB	UK
1945	"Sentimental Journey" (w/ Les Brown)	1	—	—
1945	"My Dreams Are Getting Better All the Time" (w/ Les Brown)	1	—	—
1945	"'Tain't Me" (w/ Les Brown)	10	—	—
1945	"Till the End of Time" (w/ Les Brown)	3	—	—
1945	"Aren't You Glad You're You?" (w/ Les Brown)	11	—	—
1945	"Come to Baby Do" (w/ Les Brown) /	13	—	—
1946	"You Won't Be Satisfied (Until You Break My Heart)" (w/ Les Brown)	4	—	—
1946	"Day by Day" (w/ Les Brown)	15	—	—
1946	"I Got the Sun in the Mornin' (and the Moon at Night)" (w/ Les Brown)	10	—	—
1946	"The Whole World Is Singing My Song" (w/ Les Brown)	6	—	—
1947	"The Christmas Song" (w/ Les Brown)	12	—	—
1947	"Sooner or Later" (w/ Les Brown)	13	—	—
1947	"Papa, Won't You Dance With Me"	21	—	—
1948	"Thoughtless" (w/ The Modernaires)	24	—	—
1948	"Love Somebody" (w/ Buddy Clark) /	1	—	—
1948	"Confess" (w/ Buddy Clark)	16	—	—
1948	"Put 'Em in a Box, Tie 'Em with a Ribbon, and Throw 'Em in the Deep Blue Sea" /	27	—	—
1948	"It's Magic"	2	—	—
1948	"My Darling, My Darling" (w/ Buddy Clark)	7	—	—
1949	"Powder Your Face with Sunshine" (w/ Buddy Clark)	16	—	—
1949	"Again"	2	—	—
1949	"Everywhere You Go"	22	—	—
1949	"Let's Take an Old-Fashioned Walk" (w/ Frank Sinatra)	17	—	—
1949	"Now That I Need You"	20	—	—
1949	"Canadian Capers"	15	—	—
1949	"Bluebird on Your Windowsill"	19	—	—
1950	"Quicksilver"	20	—	—
1950	"I Said My Pajamas (and Put on My Prayers)"	21	—	—
1950	"Enjoy Yourself (It's Later than You Think)"	24	—	—
1950	"Hoop-Dee-Doo"	17	—	—
1950	"Bewitched, Bothered and Bewildered"	9	—	—
1950	"I Didn't Slip, I Wasn't Pushed, I Fell"	19	—	—
1950	"A Bushel and a Peck"	16	—	—
1951	"It's a Lovely Day Today"	30	—	—
1951	"Would I Love You (Love You, Love You)"	10	—	—
1951	"Shanghai"	7	7	—
1951	"Domino"	21	—	—
1952	"A Guy Is a Guy"	1	1	—
1952	"Sugarbush" (w/ Frankie Laine)	7	12	8
1952	"When I Fall in Love"	20	—	—
1952	"No Two People" (w/ Donald O'Connor)	25	—	—
1952	"My Love and Devotion"	—	31	10
1952	"The Cherries"	—	39	—
1952	"A Full Time Job" (w/ Johnnie Ray) /	20	21	11
1952	"Ma Says, Pa Says" (w/ Johnnie Ray)	23	28	12
1953	"Mister Tap Toe"	10	11	—
1953	"When the Red, Red Robin (Comes Bob, Bob, Bobbin' Along)"	29	—	—
1953	"Candy Lips" (w/ Johnnie Ray) /	17	18	—
1953	"Let's Walk That-a-Way" (w/ Johnnie Ray)	—	31	4
1953	"Kiss Me Again, Stranger" /	30	—	—
1953	"A Purple Cow"	25	—	—
1953	"Choo Choo Train (Ch-Ch-Foo)"	20	—	—
1954	"Secret Love"	1	1	1
1954	"The Black Hills of Dakota"	—	—	7
1954	"Lost in Loveliness"	—	25	—
1954	"I Speak to the Stars"	16	17	—
1954	"Someone Else's Roses"	—	32	—
1954	"If I Give My Heart to You" /	3	2	4
1954	"Anyone Can Fall in Love"	27	41	—
1954	"Ready, Willing, and Able" /	—	31	7
1954	"Hold Me in Your Arms"	—	39	—
1955	"Foolishly Yours"	—	25	—
1955	"Love Me Or Leave Me"	—	—	20
1955	"I'll Never Stop Loving You"	13	14	17
1955	"Ooh Bang Jiggily Jang"	83	—	—
1956	"Let It Ring"	51	—	—
1956	"Que Sera, Sera (Whatever Will Be, Will Be)"	2	3	1
1956	"Julie" /	64	40	—
1956	"Love in a Home"	79	—	—
1956	"The Party's Over"	63	47	—
1957	"Twelve O'Clock Tonight"	68	—	—
1958	"Teacher's Pet"	56	36	—
1958	"A Very Precious Love"	—	—	16
1958	"Everybody Loves a Lover"	6	6	25
1958	"Tunnel of Love"	43	53	—
1959	"Love Me in the Daytime"	100	51	—
1960	"Any Way the Wind Blows"	50	109	—
1960	"Please Don't Eat the Daisies"	102	102	—
1960	"A Perfect Understanding"	111	—	—
1962	"Lover Come Back"	98	—	—
1964	"Move Over Darling"	—	—	8
1964	"Send Me No Flowers"	135	—	—
1967	"Sorry" *	—	—	—

* "Sorry" made the US AC chart at No. 19.

== Albums ==
=== 10" LP ===
- You're My Thrill (1949)
- Young Man with a Horn (1950, soundtrack with Harry James)
- Tea for Two (1950, soundtrack)
- Lullaby of Broadway (1951, soundtrack)
- On Moonlight Bay (1951, soundtrack)
- I'll See You in My Dreams (1951, soundtrack)
- By the Light of the Silvery Moon with Paul Weston and His Orchestra and the Norman Luboff Choir (1953, soundtrack)
- Calamity Jane (1953, soundtrack with Howard Keel)
- Young at Heart (1954, soundtrack with Frank Sinatra)
- Lights! Camera! Action! (1955)

=== 12" LP and/or CD ===
- Love Me or Leave Me (1955, soundtrack)
- Day Dreams with Paul Weston (1955, expanded re-issue of You're My Thrill)
- Day By Day with Paul Weston (1956)
- The Pajama Game (1957, soundtrack)
- Day by Night (1957)
- Hooray for Hollywood with Frank De Vol (2-record set, 1958)
- Doris Day's Greatest Hits (1958)
- Cuttin' Capers (1959)
- Listen to Day (1960)
- What Every Girl Should Know (1960)
- Show Time (1960)
- Bright and Shiny (1961)
- I Have Dreamed (1961)
- Wonderful Day (1961)
- Duet (with André Previn, 1962)
- You'll Never Walk Alone (1962)
- Billy Rose's Jumbo (1962, soundtrack with film cast)
- Annie Get Your Gun (1963, with Robert Goulet)
- Love Him (1963)
- The Doris Day Christmas Album (1964)
- With a Smile and a Song (1964)
- Latin for Lovers (1965)
- Doris Day's Sentimental Journey (1965)
- Whatever Will Be, Will Be (Que Sera, Sera) (1968)
- The Magic Of Doris Day (1970)
- The Love Album (released in 1994)
- My Heart (2011)

== Singles ==
Hit records:

- (with Les Brown's Band of Renown)
  - "Sentimental Journey"
    5,000,000+ sales
  - "My Dreams Are Getting Better All the Time"
    1,000,000+ sales
- (As a solo performer)
  - "It's Magic"
    1,000,000+ sales
  - "Again"
  - "Love Somebody" (duet with Buddy Clark)
    1,000,000+ sales
  - "Confess" (duet with Buddy Clark) (also done by Patti Page)
  - "Bewitched"
    1,000,000+ sales
  - "Shanghai"
  - "Sugarbush" (duet with Frankie Laine)
    1,000,000+ sales
  - "Mister Tap Toe"
  - "Secret Love"
    1,000,000+ sales
  - "If I Give My Heart to You" (also done by Denise Lor)
  - "I'll Never Stop Loving You"
    1,000,000+ sales
  - "Whatever Will Be, Will Be (Que Sera, Sera)" ("Que Sera, Sera")
    1,000,000+ sales
  - "Everybody Loves a Lover"
  - "Move Over Darling"

== See also ==
- List of songs recorded by Doris Day
