= Ohio (Wonderful Town song) =

Song from the 1953 Broadway musical "Wonderful Town"

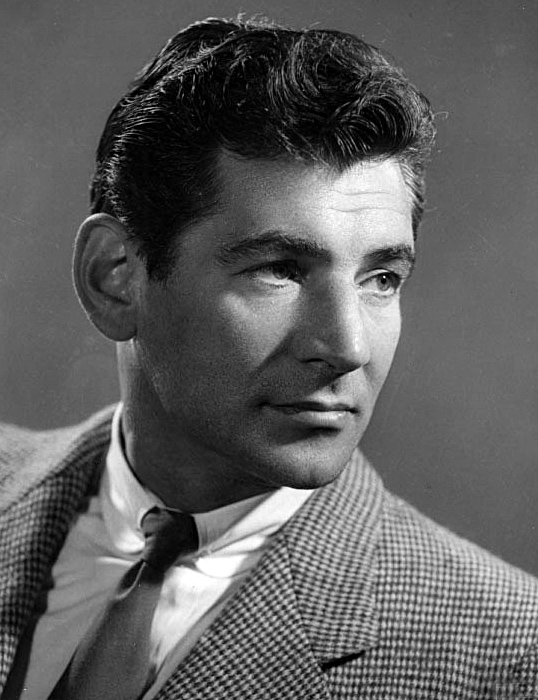
Leonard Bernstein, c. 1950s

"Ohio" is a song from the 1953 Broadway musical Wonderful Town, sung by the protagonists Ruth and Eileen, bemoaning the fact that they had left Ohio for New York City. The song was written by Leonard Bernstein, Betty Comden, and Adolph Green.

The lyric is centered around the rhyming phrase "Why, oh, why, oh, why, oh/why did I ever leave Ohio?" "Ohio" features a spoken word section in the middle, where the girls recall all the things they hated about Ohio that prompted them to leave in the first place, that ends with the sung line "Thank heaven we're free!" before going back to the title lyric.

In the original 1953 Broadway production, the song was performed by Rosalind Russell and Edie Adams, as a duet.

Bing Crosby recorded the song on February 9, 1953, with John Scott Trotter and His Orchestra.

A noteworthy recording of the song was made by Doris Day as part of her albums, Show Time (1960) and My Heart (2011).

An additional noteworthy release was in November 2010 when it was sung by Jane Lynch as Sue Sylvester and Carol Burnett as her mother Doris on the American television show Glee, which takes place in Lima, Ohio. The original spoken word section was altered with new spoken dialogue to reflect the storyline: Sue's parents abandoning her to hunt Nazis.

== See also ==
- List of songs in Glee (season 2)
