= Population control =

Practice of controlling size of animal population

Population control is the practice of artificially maintaining the size of any population. It simply refers to the act of limiting the size of an animal population so that it remains manageable, as opposed to the act of protecting a species from excessive rates of extinction, which is referred to as conservation biology.

While many abiotic and biotic factors influence population control, humans are notably influential against animal populations. Whether humans need to hunt animals for food, exterminate a pest, or reduce competition for resources, managing populations involves providing nourishment, or neutering to prevent reproduction, culling individuals or the use of pesticides. Population control plays an important role in wildlife populations. Based on the species being dealt with, there are numerous ways populations of the wild are controlled. Wildlife contraception is the act of preventing reproduction in the wild, which subsequently decreases populations. An example of this includes the maintenance of deer populations with the use of vaccines. Other methods to maintain populations include lethal trapping, live trapping, egg/roost site manipulation, live-ammunition shooting, and chemical euthanization. Lethal trapping, egg/roost site manipulation, live-ammunition shooting, and chemical euthanization are methods used to eliminate animal populations and prevent reproduction, whereas live trapping captures species to remove them from a specific area.

== Factors influencing population control ==
Population control can be influenced by a variety of factors. Humans can greatly influence the size of animal populations they directly interact with. It is, for example, relatively common (and sometimes even a legal requirement) to spay or neuter dogs. Spaying – removing the ovaries and uterus of a female animal – medical term = ovariohysterectomy. Neutering - removing the testes of a male animal – medical term = orchiectomy. Various humans activities (e.g. hunting, farming, fishing, industrialization, and urbanization) all impact various animal populations.

Population control may involve culling, translocation, or manipulation of the reproductive capability. The growth of a population may be limited by environmental factors such as food supply or predation. The main biotic factors that affect population growth include:

- Food – both the quantity and the quality of food are important. The population of a species is dependent on food availability. With more access to viable food, the population grows to meet it. With less, the less fertile a sexually mature individual of a species becomes. For example, snails cannot reproduce successfully in an environment deprived of calcium sources~~,~~ as calcium is necessary for shell growth.
- Predators – as a prey population increases, the easier it becomes for predators to find prey. Conversely, as the predator population decreases, the more the prey population is at risk of predation.
- Competitors – other organisms require the same limited resources from an ecosystem, and so limit the growth of a population. For instance, all plants compete for light. Competition for territory and for mates can drastically reduce the growth of individual organisms.
- Parasites – these may cause disease, and slow down the growth and reproductive rate of organisms within a population.

Important abiotic factors affecting population growth include:

- Temperature – higher temperatures speed up enzyme catalysis reactions and increase growth.
- Oxygen availability – affects the rate of energy production by respiration.
- Light availability – for photosynthesis. Light may also control reproductive cycles in organisms.
- Toxins and pollutants – tissue growth can be reduced by the presence of, for example, sulphur dioxide, and reproductive success may be affected by pollutants such as estrogen like substances.

Direct human impacts are not the only ways humans can control animal populations. Oftentimes, humans are indirectly controlling animal populations, in other words, the humans are not aware that their actions are controlling animal populations. For example, new infrastructure and roads can lead to animals being displaced from their natural habitat. Their new habitats that they are forced to move to may not provide the same necessities to them that they require for survival. This will result in a decreasing population as a result of human actions.

== Methods for active population control ==
Animal euthanasia is often used as a final resort to controlling animal populations. In Tangipahoa Parish, Louisiana, the parish performed mass euthanasia on the entire animal shelter population, including 54 cats and 118 dogs that were put to death due to a widespread disease outbreak that spread among the animals.

Neutering is another option available to control animal populations. The annual Spay Day USA event was established by the Doris Day Animal League to promote the neutering of pets, especially those in animal shelters, so that the population remains controllable.

=== Wildlife population control ===
Wildlife contraception is used to regulate populations of animals in the wild and halt reproduction. For example, vaccines are currently being used in deer populations. GonaCon, which was developed by the US Department of Agriculture, encourages the production of antibodies in the sex drive hormones. Specifically, it is said to remove the oestrous cycles from the females, which initially attracts the males; without the oestrous cycles, males are not interested in mating. Another type of vaccine that is being used in deer is called porcine zona pellucida (PZP). PZP works by blocking sperm with antibodies on the deer's egg surface.

When preventing reproduction fails to control populations, methods such as lethal trapping, live trapping, egg/roost site manipulation, live-ammunition shooting, and chemical euthanization are used to maintain populations.

Lethal trapping is a method used to kill animals. This type of method is usually monitored in order to ensure no ethical or public concerns arise. While this tactic is most commonly used on small animals, populations of larger animals such as beavers and foxes are also controlled with this type of method.

Live trapping is a method used to capture a variety of animals. From small animals to large animals, this type of population control method uses barrel traps, restraining snares, and leg-hold devices. Just like the lethal trapping method, this tactic also needs to be regularly monitored to ensure no ethical concerns arise, as well as reduce animal distress. Specifically, this type of population control method is popular with capturing birds.

Egg/roost site manipulation is used on birds to prevent them from nesting in prohibited areas. Water spray is popular in urban and agricultural areas as it uses sprinklers to emit surfactants. The surfactants then control bird populations by killing and preventing future birds from nesting.

Live-ammunition shooting uses firearms to eliminate animals such as birds and bears. Because this type of population control method is restricted in many parts of the world, it is only to be used when other control methods have failed.

Chemical euthanization refers to the use of chemicals to cause an easy or painless death and is divided into three categories: acute toxins, anticoagulants and decalcifiers, and fumigants. Acute toxins only require a single dose to kill animals, whereas anticoagulants and decalcifiers require numerous doses over time. Fumigants are used to suffocate animals underground. While this type of population control method poses ethical concerns, the World Society for the Protection of Animals (WSPA) believes it is necessary when human health or the safety of other animals are at risk. To ensure this control method is humane, WSPA states that it must be painless, achieve rapid unconsciousness followed by death, minimize animal fear and distress, and be reliable and irreversible.

Population control also plays a significant role in managing and controlling invasive species so that they are eliminated before becoming abundant and causing any ecological harm.

== Examples ==
Several efforts have been made to control the population of ticks, which act as vectors of a number of diseases and therefore pose a risk to humans. Efforts are also continuously being made to control wildlife populations near airports. Specifically, control measures have been approved for bald eagles and deer.

== See also ==
- Hunting – Searching, pursuing, and killing wild animals
- Malthusianism – Idea about population growth and food supply
- Overpopulation – When a population of a species exceeds the carrying capacity of its environment
- Trap–neuter–return – Strategy for controlling feral animal populations
- Trapping – Use of a device to remotely catch an animal
- Wildlife management – Management and control of wildlife populations
