= Donald Pippin =

Donald Pippin may refer to:

- Donald Pippin (Broadway director) (1926–2022), American theatre musical director and orchestral conductor
- Donald Pippin (opera director) (1925–2021), American pianist and founder of Pocket Opera
- Don Pippin, see Doris Day discography
