= Population reduction =

The term population reduction may refer to:

- Population decline or depopulation, reductions in human population levels for reasons such as low birth rate, emigration, disease or war
- a euphemism for genocide, sometimes used by perpetrators of genocide to disguise their actions
- Population control, artificially maintaining the size of any population
- Culling, deliberate reductions in animal or plant population levels, by human action
- the phase preceding the extinction of a species
