= Humane World for Animals =

Non-profit organization in the US

- Founded: November 22, 1954; 71 years ago (as National Humane Society)
- Founders: Fred Myers; Helen Jones; Larry Andrews; Marcia Glaser; Oliver M. Evans
- Tax ID no.: 53-0225390
- Legal status: 501(c)(3) nonprofit organization
- Purpose: Animal protection, animal welfare, cruelty to animals, humane education, animal ethics, animal law, wildlife conservation
- Location(s): 1255 23rd Street NW, Suite 450; Washington, D.C., United States
- Coordinates: 38°54′22″N 77°03′04″W
- Method: Public education, science-based analysis, training and education, litigation, public policy, direct care
- President and chief executive officer: Kitty Block
- Board co-chair: Susan Atherton
- Board co-chair: Thomas J. Sabatino Jr.
- Revenue: US$135,499,050 (2014)
- Expenses: $128,921,223 (2014)
- Endowment: $28,155,902
- Employees: 528 (2014)
- Volunteers: 1,520 (2014)
- Website: humaneworld.org

Humane World for Animals, formerly the Humane Society of the United States (HSUS) and Humane Society International (HSI), is a global nonprofit organization that focuses on animal welfare and opposes animal-related cruelties of national scope. It uses strategies that are beyond the abilities of local organizations. It works on issues including pets, wildlife, farm animals, horses and other equines, and animals used in research, testing and education. As of 2001, the group's major campaigns targeted factory farming, hunting, the fur trade, puppy mills, and wildlife abuse.

The global offices of Humane World for Animals are based in Washington, D.C., and the organization has offices in six continents. The original organization was founded in 1954 by journalist Fred Myers and Helen Jones, Larry Andrews, Marcia Glaser and Oliver M Evans. In 2013, the Chronicle of Philanthropy ranked the HSUS as the 136th largest charity in the US in its Philanthropy 400 listing. Its reported revenue was US$129 million and net assets US$215 million as of 2014. It employed 528 employees during 2014.

== Overview ==
HSUS formed after a schism surfaced in the American Humane Association over pound seizure, rodeo, and other policy issues. The incorporators of HSUS included four people—Larry Andrews, Marcia Glaser, Helen Jones, and Fred Myers—all of whom were active in the leadership of existing local and national groups, who would become its first four employees. One of the original founders, for whom the HSUS headquarters in Washington, D.C., was named in 1975 was Oliver Marshall Evans (1906–1975). (Source The Humane Society News of the United States Winter edition 1975–1976) He served as a director or officer for the 21 years leading up to his death in 1975. He was also President of the HSUS from 1963 to 1967. They believed that a new kind of organization would strengthen the American humane movement, and they set up HSUS as the "National Humane Society", in Washington, D.C., to ensure that it could play a strong role in national policy development concerning animal welfare. HSUS's guiding principle was ratified by its national membership in 1956: "The Humane Society of the United States opposes and seeks to prevent all use or exploitation of animals that causes pain, suffering, or fear."

== Rationale ==
The values that shaped HSUS's formation in 1954, came in some degree from the humane movement that originated in the 1860s in the United States. The idea of kindness to animals made significant inroads in American culture in the years following the Civil War. The development of sympathy for creatures in pain, the satisfaction of keeping them as pets, and the heightening awareness about the relationship between cruelty to animals and interpersonal violence strengthened the movement's popular appeal.

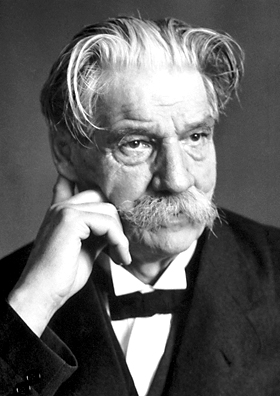
Albert Schweitzer

The most immediate philosophical influence on 1950s-era advocates, including those associated with HSUS, was the reverence-for-life concept advanced by Albert Schweitzer. Schweitzer included a deep regard for nonhuman animals in his canon of beliefs, and animal advocates laboring to give their concerns a higher profile were buoyed by Schweitzer's 1952 Nobel Peace Prize speech, in which he noted that "compassion, in which ethics takes root, does not assume its true proportions until it embraces not only man but every living being."

Myers and his colleagues found another exemplar of their values in Joseph Wood Krutch (1893–1970), whose writings reflected a deep level of appreciation for wilderness and for nonhuman life. With The Great Chain of Life (1957), Krutch established himself as a philosopher of humaneness, and in 1970, HSUS' highest award was renamed in his honor.

The growing environmental movement of the early 1970s also influenced the ethical and practical evolution of HSUS. The burgeoning crisis of pollution and wildlife-habitat loss made the public increasingly aware that humans needed to change their behavior toward other living things. By that time, too, the treatment of animals had become a topic of serious discussion within moral philosophy.

The debate spilled over into public consciousness with the publication of Peter Singer's Animal Liberation (1975). Singer's book sought to recast concern for animals as a justice-based cause like the movements for civil rights and women's rights.

Most of what Singer wrote concerning the prevention or reduction of animals' suffering was in harmony with HSUS's objectives. Singer's philosophy did not rest upon the rights of animals, and he specifically rejected the framework of rights in favor of a utilitarian assessment that focused on animal sentience. His principal concern, like that of HSUS, was the mitigation and elimination of suffering, and he endorsed the view that ethical treatment sometimes permitted or even required killing animals to end their misery.

The 1980s witnessed a flourishing of concern about animals and a proliferation of new organizations, many influenced by the emergence of a philosophy holding that animals had inherent rights. Those committed to the purest form of animal rights rejected any human use of animals. In this changing context, HSUS faced new challenges. As newer animal organizations adopted more radical approaches to achieve their goals, the organization born in anti-establishment politics now found itself identified—and sometimes criticized—as the "establishment" group of record.

== History ==
In 1954, HSUS's founders decided to create a new kind of animal organization, based in the nation's capital, to confront national cruelties beyond the reach of local societies and state federations. Humane slaughter became an immediate priority and commanded a substantial portion of the organization's resources. Myers and his colleagues also viewed this first campaign as a vehicle for promoting movement cohesion.

=== Humane slaughter legislation ===
In 1958, the Humane Methods of Slaughter Act passed, which required the proper use of humane slaughter methods at slaughterhouses subject to federal inspection. Only four years after HSUS's formation, Myers pointed out that the movement had united, for the first time in eighty-five years, to achieve enactment of federal legislation that would affect the lives of tens of millions of animals. He was encouraged that "hundreds of local societies could lift their eyes from local problems to a great national cruelty."

=== Ban of experimentation upon animals ===
HSUS also made the use of animals in research, testing, and education an early focus. In the post–World War II era, an increasingly assertive biomedical research community sought to obtain animals from pounds and shelters handling municipal animal control contracts. Local humane societies across the nation resisted. HSUS sought to bolster the movement's strong opposition to pound seizure, believing that no public pound or privately operated humane society should be compelled by law to provide animals for experimental use.

HSUS took the position that animal experimentation should be banned, and in the 1950s it placed investigators in laboratories to gather evidence of substandard conditions and animal suffering and neglect. The HSUS was not an anti-vivisection society, Myers explained in 1958. Rather, it stood for the principle that "every humane society ... should be actively concerned about the treatment accorded to such a vast number of animals."

Beginning in the 1990s, HSUS board member David O. Wiebers, a medical doctor associated with the Mayo Clinic, undertook efforts to lessen tensions between animal protection organizations and the scientific community, and to seek to identify areas of common agreement.

=== Companion animals and shelters ===
Service to local animal shelters, with a special focus on solving problems and challenges of importance to every one of the nation's humane societies, was an early priority for HSUS. Its first brochure, "They Preach Cruelty", focused on the tragedy of animal overpopulation. HSUS and its state branches operated animal shelters in Waterford, Virginia, Salt Lake City Utah, and Boulder, Colorado, and elsewhere, during the 1960s, and part of the 1970s. From the early 1960s onward, HSUS worked to promote the most humane methods possible for euthanasia of animals in shelters, using its Waterford, Virginia animal shelter as a model for best practices in this area. HSUS does not currently operate any Animal Shelters.

Under Phyllis Wright, HSUS was a driving force behind the shift to use of sodium pentobarbital for animal euthanasia, in opposition to the use of gas chambers and decompression, the standard shelter killing methods until the early 1980s.

In 1984, a General Accounting Office report confirmed HSUS allegations of major problems with puppy mills in the United States, setting the stage for proposed legislation to regulate mills in the 1990s.

=== Exposure of cruelty in the dog trade ===
In 1961, HSUS investigator Frank McMahon launched a probe of dog dealers around the country to generate support for a federal law to prevent cruelty to animals destined for use in laboratories. The five-year investigation into the multilayered trade in dogs paid off in February 1966 when Life published a photo-essay of a raid conducted on a Maryland dog dealer's premises by McMahon and the state police. The Life spread sparked outrage, and tens of thousands of Americans wrote to their congressional representatives, demanding action to protect animals and prevent pet theft. That summer the U.S. Congress approved the Laboratory Animal Welfare Act (later renamed the "Animal Welfare Act of 1966"), only the second major federal humane law passed since World War II.

=== Goals and expansion ===
Other broad goals during this time included a reduction in the U.S.'s homeless dog and cat population, the reform of inhumane euthanasia practices, and to regulate pet shops and to end the commercial pet breeding trade. HSUS and its state branches operated animal shelters in Waterford, Virginia, Salt Lake City Utah, and Boulder, Colorado, and elsewhere, during the 1960s, and part of the 1970s. Today, HSUS operates five animal sanctuaries in the states of California, Florida Massachusetts, Oregon, and Texas.

HSUS also worked, from the 1960s, to promote humane education of children in the schools. Much of this work was carried out under the auspices of an affiliate, the National Association for the Advancement of Humane Education. In the 1980s, HSUS sponsored several validation studies designed to demonstrate the value of humane education.

=== Relationship to animal rights ===
While HSUS welcomed and benefited from growing social interest in animals, it did not originally embrace the language and philosophy of animal rights. Rather, HSUS representatives expressed their beliefs that animals were "entitled to humane treatment and to equal and fair consideration." Like many of the organizations and individuals associated with humane work, HSUS did try to come to terms with the shift toward rights-based language and arguments. In 1978, attorneys Robert Welborn and Murdaugh Stuart Madden conducted a workshop at the HSUS annual conference, "Can Animal Rights Be Legally Defined?", and assembled constituents passed a resolution to the effect that "animals have the right to live and grow under conditions that are comfortable and reasonably natural... animals that are used by man in any way have the right to be free from abuse, pain, and torment caused or permitted by man... animals that are domesticated or whose natural environment is altered by man have the right to receive from man adequate food, shelter, and care." In 1980 the notion of rights surfaced in an HSUS convention resolution which, noting that "such rights naturally evolve from long accepted doctrines of justice or fairness or some other dimension of morality", called for "pursuit on all fronts... the clear articulation and establishment of the rights of animals"

In 1986, HSUS employee John McArdle declared that "HSUS is definitely shifting in the direction of animal rights faster than anyone would realize from our literature". The HSUS fired McArdle shortly thereafter, he alleged, for being an "animal rights activist".

=== Position against the use of violence ===
Since 1990 at least, HSUS has expressed a clear opposition to "the use of threats and acts of violence against people and willful destruction and theft of property." In 2008, HSUS offered a reward for information leading to the identification and arrest of parties involved with the firebombing of two University of California animal researchers.

== Recent history ==
=== Wayne Pacelle tenure ===
In the spring of 2004, the HSUS board appointed Wayne Pacelle as CEO and president. A former executive director of The Fund for Animals and named in 1997 as "one of America's most important animal rights activists", the Yale graduate spent a decade as HSUS's chief lobbyist and spokesperson, and expressed a strong commitment to expand the organization's base of support as well as its influence on public policies that affect animals. Under Pacelle's leadership, HSUS has undertaken several dozen ballot initiative and referendum campaigns in a number of states, concerning issues like unsportsmanlike hunting practices, cruelty in industrial agriculture, greyhound racing, puppy mill cruelty and animal trapping. In August 2014, Pacelle was again named to the NonProfit Times' "Power and Influence Top 50" for his achievements in leading HSUS, the fourth time he has been so recognized.

Since Pacelle's appointment, HSUS has claimed successes such as the adoption of "cage-free" egg-purchasing policies by hundreds of universities and dozens of corporations; the exposure of an international trophy hunting scam subsequently ended through legislative reform; a number of successful congressional votes to outlaw horse slaughter; progress in securing legislation at the state and federal level to outlaw animal fighting and the interstate transport of fighting implements; the enactment of internet hunting bans in nearly all of the states; announcements by Wolfgang Puck and Burger King that they would increase their use of animal products derived under less abusive standards; and an agreement by the U.S. Department of Agriculture to begin enforcement of federal laws concerning the transportation of farm animals.

In 2018, The Washington Post reported on a Humane Society board investigation conducted by Morgan, Lewis & Bockius into allegations of sexual harassment involving Wayne Pacelle. The investigation found three credible accusations of sexual harassment and female leaders who said their "warnings about his conduct went unheeded." The board voted to keep Pacelle, but after several board members, including author Suzy Welch and philanthropist Marsha Perelman, resigned in protest and high-profile donors revealed they would withhold donations, Pacelle announced his resignation on February 2, 2018. Shortly thereafter, Perelman, along with Kathleen Linehan, returned to the board as Vice Chair and Treasurer, respectively.

The HSUS board of directors closed the investigation, declining to take any action, and issued a statement that Morgan, Lewis had found no "credible evidence" that would "support the women's claims", sparking outrage and resulting in the resignation of seven further board members. The organization named as Acting President and interim CEO, Kitty Block, who was President of the international affiliate of the organization, Humane Society International, and who had sued her former HSUS boss, David Wills, for sexual harassment 20 years ago. On January 25, 2019, Kitty Block was named official President and CEO of the organization, and Susan Atherton and Thomas J. Sabatino, Jr. were appointed co-chairs of the HSUS Board, after Board Chairman Eric L. Bernthal stepped down after seven years of service.

=== Animal protection litigation section ===
HSUS launched an animal protection litigation section in 2005. The section works with several thousand pro bono attorneys around the country to pursue its docket of cases. Under section leader Jonathan Lovvorn, the animal protection litigation group has won approximately three dozen cases in its first decade of existence, taking a practical approach, which Lovvorn explained in a 2012 interview. "We look at cases that are going to have a concrete impact on animals but are winnable. You won't see us out asking for courts to declare animals persons. Or to file habeas corpus requests on behalf of animals, or other things that require judges to go way beyond what they're comfortable with." In 2010, the section estimated that it had filed more than 50 legal actions in 25 states, and won 80% of its cases, while booking 10,000 hours of pro bono attorney time for a total in-kind contribution of $4 million.

=== Canadian seal cull campaign ===
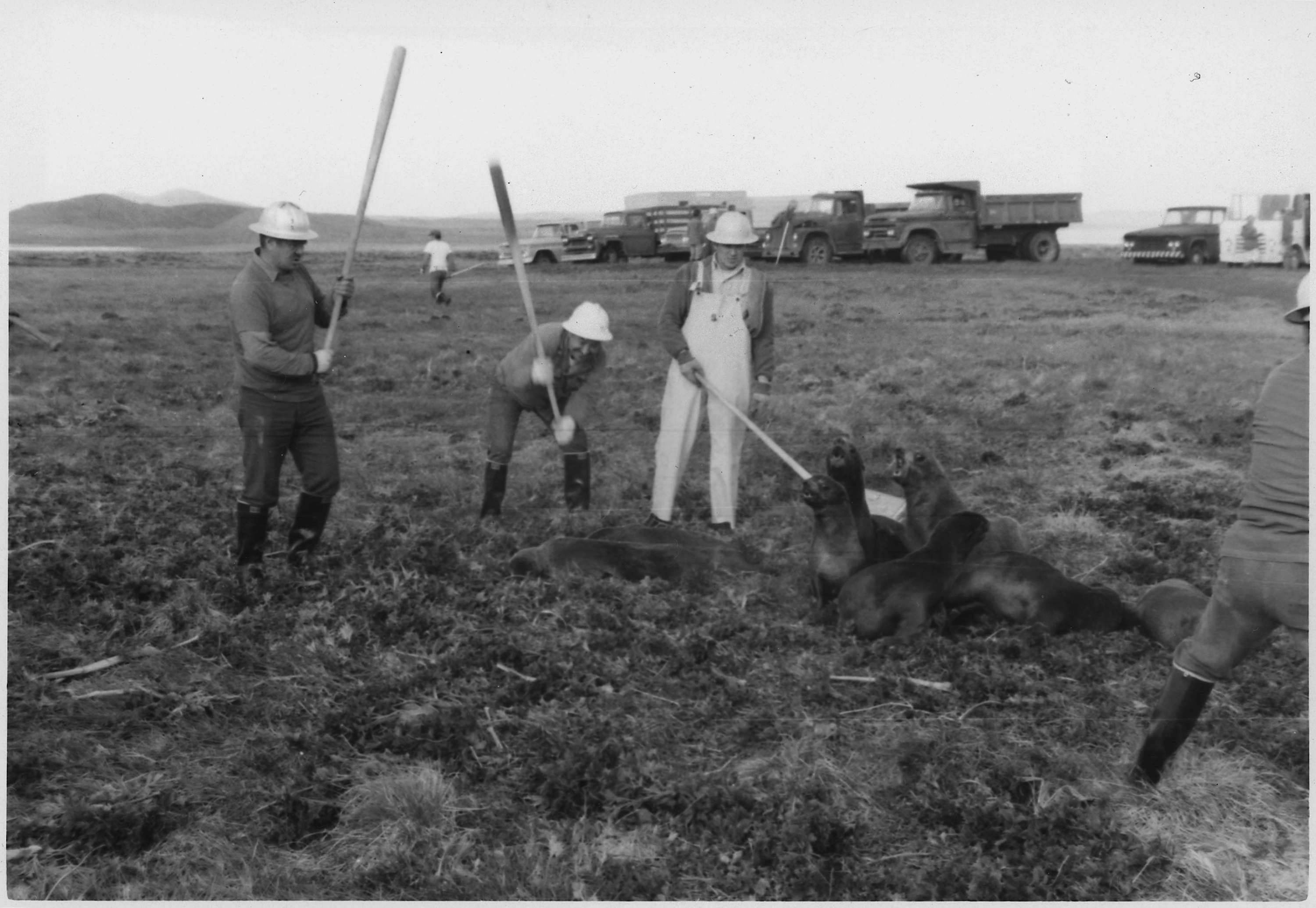
Seals being clubbed

Once launched in 2005, the HSUS's campaign to end the hunting of seals in Canada secured pledges from 300 restaurants and companies, plus 120,000 individuals, to boycott Canadian seafood. By 2014, the campaign claimed more than 6,500 restaurants, grocery stores and seafood supply companies were participants the Protect Seals campaign.

=== Corporate expansion ===
The corporate expansion forged by Pacelle included mergers with The Fund for Animals (2005), founded by social critic and author Cleveland Amory and the Doris Day Animal League (2006), founded by screen actress and singer Doris Day. This made possible the establishment of a separate campaigns department, an equine issues department, a litigation section, the enhancement of signature programs likes Pets for Life and Wild Neighbors, and an expanded range of hands-on care programs for animals. During the first 2½ years of Pacelle's tenure, overall revenues and expenditures grew by more than 50 percent. In early 2008, HSUS re-organized its direct veterinary care work and its veterinary advocacy under a new entity, the Humane Society Veterinary Medical Association, formed through an alliance with the Association of Veterinarians for Animal Rights (AVAR).

=== Corporate social responsibility outreach ===
Engagement with major corporations in an effort to persuade them to press for reforms in their supply chains has been a significant priority for HSUS in the last decade, and as a result of its efforts, more than 60 major food suppliers have used their leverage to change production level practices in the pork industry.

Shareholder resolutions play a part in HSUS campaigns to generate corporate reform.

=== Faith outreach ===
In 2007, HSUS launched a program designed to advance relationships and awareness within the American faith community at all levels. The program provides speakers, produces videos and other materials, and works with faith leaders to lead discussion of animal issues within the broader religious community. HSUS works on this program with Farm Forward, a 501(c)(3) nonprofit organization that implements innovative strategies to promote conscientious food choices, reduce farmed animal suffering, and advance sustainable agriculture.

=== Humane Society Institute for Science and Policy ===
The Humane Society Institute for Science and Policy (HSISP), founded in 2010, supports the application of scientific and technical analysis and expertise to animal welfare issues and policy questions worldwide. HSISP is sustained by HSUS's own core group of academic, scientific, and technical experts in animal welfare, as well as outside scientists. HSISP is the manager of the Animal Studies Repository, a digital collection of academic and scientific resources related to animal studies and to animal welfare science. HSISP has held three conferences, the first on purebred dogs and genetic defects, the second on outdoor cats and associated management issues, and the third on sentience as a factor in determining animal welfare policy.

=== Hurricane Katrina animal rescue ===
In September 2005, when thousands of animals were left behind as people evacuated during Hurricane Katrina, HSUS joined other organizations in a massive search-and-rescue effort that saved approximately ten thousand animals, and raised more than $34 million for direct relief, reconstruction, and recovery in the Gulf Coast region. HSUS led the campaign that culminated in the federal passage of the PETS Act in October 2006, requiring all local, state, and federal agencies to include animals in their disaster planning scenarios.

In August 2008, Pacelle appeared with Louisiana Attorney General Buddy Caldwell at a press conference marking the enactment of a law prohibiting cockfighting in Louisiana, the last state to do so. The prohibition resulted from a longtime campaign led by HSUS. The HSUS remains active in the Gulf region, funding a number of projects aimed at reducing the area's pet overpopulation problem, and improving access to pet care for the Gulf Coast residents.

=== Investigation into "faux" fur ===
In late 2006, HSUS broke the story of its investigation into the sale of coats trimmed with real fur but labeled "faux" or fake. Laboratory testing found that the fur came from purpose-bred raccoon dogs in China that were sometimes beaten to death and skinned alive. The story of fur animals beaten to death and skinned alive is disputed by a fur industry trade group. The investigation reportedly prompted several retailers including Macy's and J.C. Penney to pull the garments from the sale floor. Legislation was introduced in the U.S. Congress to require that all fur jackets be properly labeled, and to ban raccoon dog fur.

In 2014, HSUS accused Kohl's department store of selling a men's jacket made with real animal fur as "faux", and issued a warning to consumers.

=== Investigation of Westland Meat Packing Company ===
In February 2008, after an undercover investigation conducted by HSUS at the Westland Meat Packing Company alleged substantial animal abuse, the USDA forced the recall of 143 million pounds of beef, some of which had been routed into the nation's school lunch program. HSUS had been a longtime advocate for the elimination of downer animals from the nation's food supply, and the undercover investigation led to the USDA adopting the policy. In November 2013, the Justice Department reached a $155 million settlement with the firms that operated the plant. Michael Greger, Director of Public Health and Animal Agriculture for HSUS at that time, testified before Congress about the matter.

=== Petland puppy mills campaign ===
In the fall of 2008, HSUS also launched a campaign to expose the reliance of the pet store chain Petland on puppy mills where animals are raised under inhumane conditions. However, Jessica Mitler from the United States Department of Agriculture (USDA), the government agency that regulates dog breeders, provided the following response to the HSUS investigation: "The agency has received no complaints from the Humane Society about a particular kennel or Petland; so they have not investigated this specifically." On November 24, 2008, Petland responded to the HSUS campaign video footage of the Petland investigation by stating: "Petland is outraged that HSUS would intentionally use video footage of unrelated kennels in the report to try to mislead the general public into believing these facilities have a connection to Petland." In another statement dated February 19, 2009, Petland stated they turned over death threats and threats of kidnapping generated from the HSUS campaign against Petland to the proper authorities for further investigation. Petland continued by asking HSUS to cease and desist in any actions that may promote malicious intent (directly or indirectly).

On March 17, 2009, HSUS launched a class action suit against Petland on behalf of patrons who allegedly purchased sick animals from the chain, under the alleged pretense that the animals had come from the nation's finest breeders. On August 8, 2009, the case was dismissed by a United States district judge for lack of facts concerning the case. Petland responded to the dismissal by stating: "The Humane Society of the United States touted the lawsuit in furtherance of its fundraising and media campaign seeking to end the sale of animals through pet stores. Petland denied that it had done anything unlawful, and it believes strongly that consumers have the right to purchase and keep pets." The HSUS does not oppose the ownership of pets, but maintains that the desire for profit in commercial pet stores undermines proper care of companion animals.

=== Political and legislative initiatives against animal abuse and cruelty ===
During 2013, HSUS helped to pass 109 animal protection laws at the state level. In 2006, HSUS helped to secure the passage of 70 new state laws on behalf of animals. Two successful November 2006 ballot initiatives conducted with its support outlawed dove hunting in Michigan and, through Proposition 204, abusive livestock-farming practices in Arizona. In 2008, HSUS helped to pass 91 state animal-welfare laws, including Proposition 2 in California. HSUS was a leader in the Proposition 2 campaign in California, which gained eight million votes on Election Day 2008, more than any other initiative on the ballot. The measure, which prohibits certain intensive confinement practices in agriculture beginning in 2015, passed by a 63.3 to 36.7 percent margin, winning in 46 of 58 counties, and gaining support throughout the state's urban, suburban, and rural areas. It garnered votes from Democrats, independents, and Republicans alike, as well as among Caucasians, African-Americans, Asian-Americans, and the Latinx populace. Nearly 800,000 Californians signed petitions to place the measure on the ballot.

HSUS was also a participant in a ballot initiative campaign focusing on inhumane treatment of farm animals in Ohio. The livestock-agriculture initiative was withdrawn from the ballot after a compromise was brokered between HSUS, Ohioans for Humane Farms, the Ohio Farm Bureau, and Ohio Governor Ted Strickland.

HSUS led a campaign against puppy mill cruelty in Missouri in 2010. The Puppy Mill Cruelty Prevention Act, known as "Prop B", was narrowly passed by Missouri voters.

=== United Egg Producers ===
For several years, HSUS cooperated with the United Egg Producers to secure federal legislation to phase out barren battery cages for all laying hens in the United States. Discussion between HSUS and the United Egg Producers concerning a national standard for egg production began with a meeting between Jerry Crawford, an Iowa resident with ties to the egg production industry, and HSUS's Wayne Pacelle. Crawford recommended a further meeting with the United Egg Producers' Chad Gregory. The context for the meeting was HSUS's commanding win in Proposition 2 in California, and a shared belief that open warfare would serve no one's purposes. Additional negotiations produced the agreement to pursue federal legislation, the Egg Products Inspection Act of 2013, to support a shift to cage-free housing systems for laying hens, like enriched colony cages. The proposal failed in the Congress, and was not taken up in the 2014 Farm Bill, as a result of opposition by livestock production groups concerned over the precedent of federally-mandated standards for housing. Hog producers in particular recognized their vulnerability in reference to gestation crates.

== Positions and program work ==
=== Animal fighting ===
In July 2007, HSUS led calls for the National Football League to suspend Atlanta Falcons quarterback Michael Vick in the wake of allegations that he had been involved with dog fighting activity. Vick was prosecuted and convicted under state and federal laws. HSUS has backed upgrades of the federal laws concerning animal fighting in 2007, 2008, and in relation to the Animal Fighting Spectator Prohibition Act, from 2011 to the present.

=== Animals in research, testing, and education ===
Beginning in the 1990s, HSUS board member David O. Wiebers, a medical doctor associated with the Mayo Clinic, undertook efforts to lessen tensions between animal protection organizations and the scientific community, and to seek to identify areas of common agreement. The announcement by the NIH that it would no longer fund experiments that relied on Class B dealers marked the end of a long campaign by HSUS and other organizations to halt this channel for the supply of animals.

In 2013, HSUS worked closely with the Arcus Foundation and other partners in the successful effort to persuade the U.S. government to transfer the remaining chimpanzees it owns to sanctuary over time, and for an end to chimpanzee use in research, testing, and education. Since 2007, HSUS has pressed corporations still using chimpanzees in research to commit to policies of non-use. In 2011, the Institute of Medicine, part of the United States National Academies, recommended the curtailment of chimp use in testing. The IOM said that while genetic similarity made chimps valuable for medical research, such research raised ethical issues and carried a "moral cost". In 2014, Merck, the world's third largest pharmaceutical company, became the largest multinational corporation to make such a commitment.

=== Animals used for food ===
==== Basic policy ====
HSUS opposes cruelty in the raising and slaughter of animals used for food, and has done so since its inception in 1954. HSUS's policy of the 3 Rs encourages its constituents to reduce their consumption of meat.

=== Campaigns ===
HSUS led the ballot initiative campaign to enact California Proposition 2 (2008), enacted as the Prevention of Farm Animal Cruelty Act, requiring cage-free conditions for laying hens, mother pigs and veal calves raised in the state. An HSUS-led coalition also pressed for the passage of a California foie gras ban that took effect in mid-2012. In 2016, HSUS led the campaign to enact the Massachusetts Conditions for Farm Animals Initiative, which banned the use of small cages to raise animals in agriculture; it received 77.7% of public support.

In 2018, the HSUS-led California Proposition 12 (2018), which built on the 2008 law, mandated that eggs, pork and veal produced and sold in the state come from cage-free facilities. Since then, HSUS has spearheaded successful efforts to pass cage-free legislation in Washington, Oregon, Michigan and Colorado.

HSUS has convinced hundreds of the largest grocery and restaurant companies to enact reforms regarding their treatment of farm animals. The organization also collaborates with food service companies and institutions to offer more plant-based meals, stating that in 2019 it trained more than 10,000 food service professionals.

=== Companion animals ===
The HSUS has an entire department devoted to pets, and to services for companion animals. It also has sections working to end dog-fighting, and to provide rescue and emergency services to animals at risk in animal fighting, hoarding, puppy mill enterprises and disasters. The HSUS Pets for Life program uses community-level outreach in a number of American cities, including Los Angeles, and Philadelphia, to raise retention levels and to improve the lives of companion animals and those who care for them, by providing veterinary services in zones where convenient and low-cost care is lacking. The HSUS is a strong supporter of "pets in the workplace" programs.

HSUS publishes Animal Sheltering, a bi-monthly magazine for animal sheltering professionals. It also operates the Humane Society Veterinary Medical Association, which provides free veterinary services for animals in impoverished communities.

In 2013, the HSUS gave its Henry Spira Corporate Progress Award to the Consumer Specialty Products Association to recognize the antifreeze manufacturing industry's commitment to add a bittering agent to products so that animals would not die poisonous deaths, the subject of a long-running campaign by the HSUS.

HSUS believes that, in general, wild animals are not suitable as pets, and opposes the general traffic in wild animals.

=== Puppy mills ===
HSUS has been an active opponent of the domestic and global puppy mill industry, and helped law enforcement agencies to confiscate more than 35,000 animals from purported puppy mills since 2007. HSUS has also pressed anti-puppy mill bills in states like Indiana, Missouri, Oklahoma, Pennsylvania, and Texas. The number of dog breeders licensed by the United States Department of Agriculture declined from 3,486 in 2009 to 2,205 in 2011.

HSUS led the effort to secure adoption of a United States Department of Agriculture rule to prohibit the importation into the United States of dogs from foreign countries for resale unless the animals were in good health, vaccinated and at least 6 months old.

Dog breeders opposed another measure supported by HSUS, to regulate the sale of dogs over the Internet.

=== Wildlife ===
HSUS opposes the hunting of any living creature for fun, trophy, or sport. HSUS only supports killing animals for population control when carried out by officials and does not oppose hunting for food or subsistence needs. As a practical matter, HSUS has generally campaigned against abuses found in the treatment of wildlife. Its ballot initiatives focus on things like shooting bear over bait, hunting with hounds, and other forms of hunting the organization believes are unsporting.

Together with its global affiliate, Humane Society International, HSUS has waged a decade-long fight to end the Canadian seal hunt. In late 2013, the World Trade Organization upheld the European Union ban on trade in products of commercial seal hunts, rejecting the Canadian and Norwegian challenge.

HSUS has waged campaigns on behalf of wolves since the 1970s. In recent years, HSUS has campaigned against the killing of wolves via ballot initiatives, and—with other partners—in litigation.

In June 2007, HSUS launched Humane Wildlife Services, a program to encourage and provide humane wildlife-removal services when wild animals intrude on human dwellings.

Through its efforts in the United States, and globally through its affiliate Humane Society International, HSUS has helped to achieve prohibitions on shark finning in state and national legislatures and through administrative action here and abroad.

The HSUS offers many resources to individuals, organizations and public officials, for helping feral cats and ultimately reducing their numbers in the community. The Humane Society Institute for Science and Policy convened a conference on outdoor cat issues in December 2012, bringing together stakeholders from a range of interested perspectives.

=== Zoos ===
HSUS first took a policy position on zoos in 1975, its board of directors concluding that it would be neither for nor against zoos, but would work against roadside menageries and regular zoos that could not improve. In 1984, HSUS adopted a policy that animals should not be taken from the wild for public display in zoos.

=== Other issues ===
HSUS opposes greyhound racing, animal fighting, and works to limit the use and abuse of animals in certain display and spectacular contexts like zoos, circuses, aquariums, and roadside zoos.

HSUS has taken a careful but critical stance concerning practices commonly found in the horse racing industry. On occasion, HSUS has taken a position against particular practices associated with horse racing, such as the use of corticosteroids.

HSUS has long opposed the keeping of marine mammals in captivity and played a key longterm role in the campaign to end captive orca performance at SeaWorld. HSUS opposed the Georgia Aquarium's application to the National Marine Fisheries Service to import 18 beluga whales from Russia, an application the NMFS denied.

HSUS has long opposed the use of horses for food, and campaigned against their slaughter via litigation and public policy approaches. It has pursued both legislative and litigation channels as part of its campaign to prevent horse slaughter plants in the United States from resuming their operations.

HSUS, in addition to its ongoing lobbying against the pet industry, has taken a strong stance against the private ownership of any exotic pet, regardless of species. The HSUS also heavily lobbied for the passing of HB 4393 in West Virginia, which generated a large amount of controversy when its restricted animal list was originally drafted and made illegal the private ownership of common and harmless exotic pets, such as hamsters, hedgehogs, turtles, tortoises, pufferfish, sugar gliders, salamanders, alpacas and domestic hybrid cat breeds.

== Governance and expenses ==
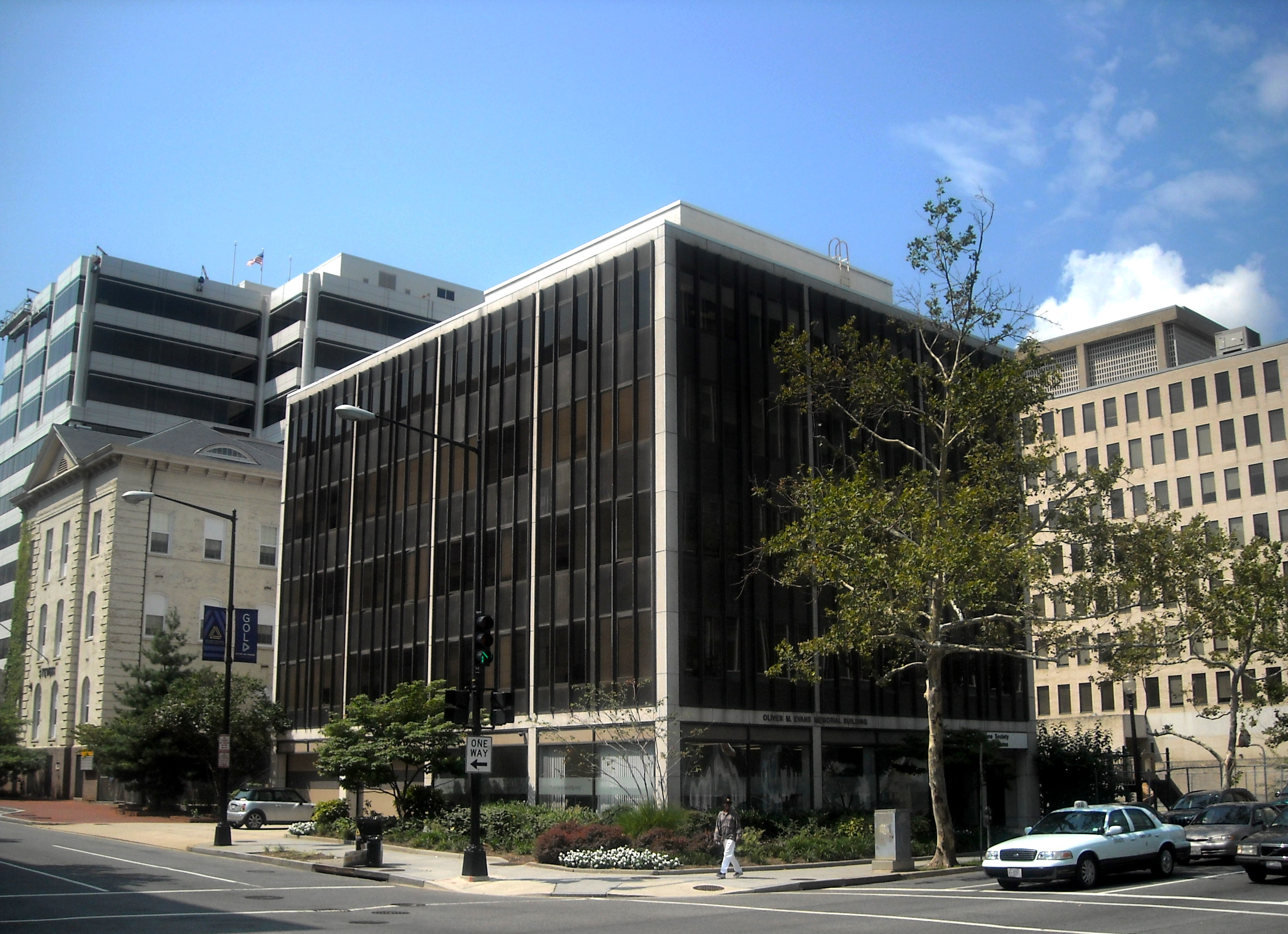
The Humane Society of the United States headquarters located in the West End neighborhood of Washington, D.C.

A nonprofit, charitable organization, HSUS is funded almost entirely by private membership dues, contributions, foundation grants, and bequests. HSUS is governed by a 27-member, independent board of directors. Each director serves as a volunteer and receives no compensation for service.

HSUS meets all 21 BBB Wise Giving Alliance financial and administrative standards, and all 20 of the BBB's Standards for Charity Accountability. In 2010, Worth magazine named the HSUS as one of the 10 Most Fiscally Responsible Charities. In 2012, President and CEO Wayne Pacelle received $347,675 in compensation.

In 2014, Charity Navigator issued a "Donor Advisory" about HSUS, temporarily removing its rating of the organization.

== Grantmaking ==
HSUS gave grants to 260 other organizations in the U.S. and abroad during 2011, totaling $6.5 million.

According to its IRS Form 990, HSUS makes grants to organizations that meet its mission criteria, and typically to those groups which it has researched, with which it has an existing relationship, or with which its staff members have interacted at events and through other channels. HSUS lists all grants of $500 or more, with details, although the IRS Schedule F requires only that grants surpassing $5,000 need be reported.

== Affiliated and related entities ==
=== Humane Society International ===
Founded in 1991, its international arm, Humane Society International (HSI) (formerly called Humane Society International), seeks to expand the HSUS's activities into Central and South America, Africa, and Asia. HSI's Asian, Australian, Canadian, and European offices carry out field activities and programs. It expanded the HSUS's activities into Central and South America, Africa, and Asia. Humane World for Animals' Asian, Latin American, Australian, Canadian, African and European offices carry out field activities and programs. In February 2025, HSI and the HSUS renamed to Humane World for Animals.

It addresses issues such as inhumane practices and conditions affecting companion and farm animals, illegal wildlife trade, threats to endangered species, slaughter of marine mammals, the use of animals in research and testing, and the suffering of animals for the fur trade. HSI works with national and jurisdictional governments, humane organizations, and individual animal protectionists in over 50 countries worldwide to find practical, culturally sensitive.

It has offices in half a dozen nations and a broad range of international animal protection programs. One of the largest veterinary clinics in the Midwest is the Humane Society location in St. Louis, the growth and success of the clinic has been accredited to their Chief of Staff for 55 years, Suzanne Saueressig. The clinic admits around 80,000 patients a year and averages around 17,000 surgeries.

=== Humane Society Veterinary Medical Association ===
The Humane Society Veterinary Medical Association (HSVMA) was formed in 2008 to encompass both veterinary advocacy and veterinary clinical services work conducted by the HSUS, and to provide a political alternative to the American Veterinary Medical Association for veterinarians of a strong animal welfare orientation.

=== Humane Society Wildlife Land Trust ===
As an affiliate of the Humane Society of the United States since 1993 HSWLT, alone or in partnership with other conservation groups, has participated in the protection and enhancement of more than 3.6 million acres of wildlife habitat in 38 states and nine foreign countries. HSWLT has taken both large and small properties under its protection, through title donations, conservation easements, and formal agreements, to provide sanctuaries for a variety of animal species. In recent years, HSWLT has also sponsored anti-poaching awards as part of its commitment to public awareness and law enforcement work.

=== Doris Day Animal League ===
The Doris Day Animal League, established in 1987 by the actress Doris Day, is a 501(c)(4) organization that focuses the spaying and neutering of companion animals and the development of national, state and local legislation that will minimize the inhumane treatment of animals. The League launched its annual observance of Spay Day USA in 1994, to bring attention to the pet overpopulation problem in the United States.

=== The Fund for Animals ===
The Fund for Animals, founded by the social critic Cleveland Amory in 1967, worked for many years on wildlife issues. Today, it is an entity that manages animal care facilities as an affiliate of HSUS. Its sanctuaries include the Ramona Wildlife Facility, the Cleveland Amory Black Beauty Ranch, the Duchess Horse Sanctuary, and the Cape Wildlife Center.

=== Humane Society Legislative Fund ===
The Humane Society Legislative Fund is a 501(c)(4) organization formed in 2004. The group supports the passage of animal protection laws at the state and federal levels, educates the public about animal protection issues, and supports humane candidates for office. In the 2014 cycle, the Humane Society Legislative Fund has endorsed 38 Republicans and 240 Democrats in races across the country. In the 2024 presidential election, the fund endorsed Kamala Harris for president.

The fund raised $7.3 million in 2023., per their 2023 IRS Form 990.

== Critics ==
=== Center for Consumer Freedom ===
The Center for Consumer Freedom (CCF), an organization that lobbies on behalf of the food and beverage industry, has criticized HSUS for many years. Experts on non-profit law question CCF's non-profit status, while commentators from Rachel Maddow to Michael Pollan have characterized CCF as an astroturfing group. CCF's founder Richard Berman has refused to disclose its funders, and in 2013 Charity Navigator issued a donor advisory concerning the group. CCF has produced several advertising campaigns alleging various improprieties by HSUS and accusing HSUS of misrepresenting itself to supporters and donors. HSUS has rejected CCF's accusations as "falsehoods and distortions" by "a flack agency and industry front group for tobacco, alcohol, and agribusiness interests."

Non-profit groups operated by Berman's public relations firm paid Berman and Company $15 million from 2008 to 2010, an arrangement that may violate Internal Revenue Service rules that prohibit executives from profiting off of the non-profit entities they run. CCF carries out its attacks on HSUS via advertisements and direct mail campaigns targeting HSUS donors and supporters. CCF takes this approach in criticizing HSUS: in 2014, HSUS reported revenue of $135,499,050, and it disbursed $15,843,692 of grants.

The CCF created the Humane Watch website. In 2012, Mother Jones reported the following: "According to the Center for Consumer Freedom's 2010 tax filing, the group set aside about a million dollars to set up its anti-Humane Society website "Humane Watch." Berman has created a separate group with the oddly Humane Society-sounding name, the Humane Society for Shelter Pets. Its website snarks at the Humane Society for failing to provide more money for animal shelters."

=== Nathan Winograd ===
Nathan Winograd, a No Kill advocate, has been critical of HSUS. He has accused the organization of aiding animal abusers by thwarting legislation designed to curtail abuse. He made such claims in a Huffington Post article entitled "Putting Abusers Before Animals Is Business as Usual at the HSUS." Winograd's general claims concerning HSUS and animal sheltering work have been disputed or qualified by other parties.

=== Protect the Harvest ===
Protect the Harvest is an organization founded by trucking magnate Forrest Lucas of Lucas Oil, who uses the group to defend industrial animal agriculture and commercial dog breeders, on whose behalf he has spent hundreds of thousands of dollars nationwide. Protect the Harvest is a 501(c)(4) advocacy organization, and in 2014 formed a Political Action Committee to elect and defeat candidates for office. Executive Director Brian Klippenstein has singled out HSUS as a target of his organization's political activities, and as treasurer of Protect the Harvest PAC he and Lucas campaign against candidates the two groups consider aligned with HSUS.

=== The United States Association of Reptile Keepers ===
The United States Association of Reptile Keepers (USARK) is a 501(c)(6) organization that lobbies on behalf of the captive-bred reptiles industry, which is made up of both pet owners and professional breeders, as well as supporting zoos and sanctuaries. USARK has argued against a national ban that HSUS has lobbied for since its writing in 2009, which was originally intended to ban the import and interstate transport of nine constrictor snake species. However, due to pressure from the reptile keepers association, the U.S. government lessened the ban to include only four of the original nine species. As a response, Wayne Pacelle wrote on his blog in response that "these large constricting snakes are not suitable as pets", continuing with "they suffer from capture in the wild and long-distance transport for trade; they can injure and kill people who possess or interact with them; and they can wreak havoc on our natural resources as an invasive species, killing native wildlife, including endangered animals."

In the summer of 2014, the United States Fish and Wildlife Service reopened its admission of comments on whether to list the five remaining species of snakes on the Lacey Act, including boa constrictors. The HSUS then called upon its proponents to send in replies and letters to support further restriction of the trade in the reptiles. In response, USARK has accused the HSUS of directly telling its advocates to lie to the U.S. government: the reptile keepers association stating on their website that "HSUS President Wayne Pacelle is even asking HSUS followers to join in and lie to the U.S. Government by sending their sample letter." They continue their argument with "Their deceptive campaign continues because there is not valid, peer-reviewed science to support their claims. They lack credible arguments and instead focus on sensationalized propaganda." HSUS has always been against the keeping of snakes in captivity, stating that they are a "threat to public safety" and that the welfare of the snakes themselves are at risk, as they "[require] specialized expertise and care." The HSUS is also against the keeping of other reptiles in captivity, such as turtles and iguanas, which is in direct opposition of USARK's interests.

== Specific criticism ==
=== Allegations of misappropriation of donations for Hurricane Katrina rescues ===
In 2006, the Attorney General of Louisiana opened an inquiry into the American Red Cross and HSUS after complaints about the misuse of funds raised in the aftermath of Hurricane Katrina. This inquiry was part of a wide-ranging effort to ensure that charities providing relief for the victims of the hurricane did not profit from the incident. Neither Attorney General Charles Foti nor his successor Buddy Caldwell took any action, and the inquiry focusing on HSUS ended in early 2008. AR-HR's analysis of the HSUS's 2005, 2006, and 2007 tax returns claimed that 48% of the $34.6 million donated to the HSUS for the purposes of helping animals after Hurricane Katrina was then unaccounted for. For a number of years, HSUS published updates on its Gulf Coast spending, the last of which appeared in 2011.

=== Allegations of misleading fundraising materials ===
Critics including the CCF, AR-HR, and Nathan Winograd have accused HSUS of misleading donors into thinking that their donations directly support local animal shelters, when HSUS has no affiliation with or control over local humane societies. HSUS states on its website that it is not affiliated with local animal shelters, and that the organization's role is to supplement and support the work of local shelters, not duplicate them. The fundraising materials of HSUS do not make the claim that HSUS runs local shelters, or that donations will be applied directly to local animal shelters.

=== Allegations of financial malfeasance ===
According to the "Pennies for Charity" report issued by the New York State Attorney General, of the $1.95 million raised in 2008 by fundraisers, only 5.29% went to HSUS. The average return for charities in the report was 39.5%. HSUS actually incurred a net loss of $5,358 (−0.32%) in 2007. Those figures in 2006 and 2005 numbers were more positive, with 7.27% and 19.99% of contributions going to HSUS.

In July 2015, the Council of State Governments (CSG) passed a resolution calling on their states' attorneys general to investigate HSUS' fundraising efforts. The resolution highlighted the fact that HSUS' promotional materials give the impression that animals are the main focus, even though only one percent of the money raised goes to pet shelters (and HSUS runs none itself).

=== Animal rights agenda ===
USA Today, The International Herald Tribune and The San Francisco Chronicle have described HSUS as devoted to "animal rights", as opposed to "animal welfare". Shortly after Wayne Pacelle joined HSUS, he stated in an interview with the Animal People newspaper that his goal was to build "a National Rifle Association of the animal rights movement". The IHT describes HSUS as the "least radical" of animal rights groups. Feedstuffs, an agribusiness newspaper, has leveled the charge that HSUS is pursuing a vegetarianism and veganism agenda instead of animal welfare. In 2010, one journalist in Oregon also claimed that HSUS "primarily works on animal rights legislation."

=== Charity Navigator ===
In June 2014, Charity Navigator replaced its rating of HSUS with a "Donor Advisory" citing a $15.75 million settlement of a lawsuit. A Charity Navigator representative told The Washington Examiner that a Donor Advisory indicates "extreme concern." The advisory has since been removed. At no point did it ever have anything to do with financial metrics, governance, transparency, or the impact and effectiveness of work to protect animals. It came solely as a result of a legal settlement the HSUS and several other parties reached with the owner of Ringling Bros. circus.

Charity Navigator rated them at 85.09 for the 2014 fiscal year, and at 75.61 for the 2019 fiscal year.

=== Charity Watch ===
The American Institute of Philanthropy (AIP), now called Charity Watch, has been critical of the HSUS. Charity Watch gave the HSUS a "C−" in 2013. Charity Watch believes that HSUS spends an insufficient percentage of donations on programs, and an inordinately high percentage on fundraising. Using different estimates of fundraising expenses and efficiency, the AIP's rating system heavily penalizes charities for possessing large assets or maintaining more than three years' operating expenses in reserve. Only Charity Watch among all charity evaluation groups believes that organizations should not write off some of their fundraising costs as program expenses. Other evaluators agree with the approach taken under generally accepted accounting principles, which permit such joint allocation of expenses.

The organization maintains a focus on particular financial measurements, strictly interpreting all direct mail, telemarketing and solicitation costs as separate fundraising expenses.

=== Feld Entertainment litigation ===
Feld Entertainment sued HSUS and other animal-rights advocates and advocacy groups under the Racketeer Influenced and Corrupt Organizations (RICO) Act. Feld asserted HSUS wrongdoing in relation to litigation brought by animal rights activists against Feld alleging abuse of animals in the circus. This litigation was dismissed in 2009, with the judge finding that animal-rights groups had paid the key witness, a former Feld employee, at least $190,000, a significant amount of which was in a check signed by Mr. Pacelle. HSUS's merger and combination with The Fund for Animals drew HSUS into the case. In December 2012, the ASPCA settled the Feld suit and agreed to pay $9.3 million. In May 2014, HSUS and the remaining co-defendants (which included two HSUS employees, the HSUS affiliate Fund for Animals, and parties unaffiliated with HSUS) agreed to pay $15.75 million to settle the litigation.

=== IRS complaint ===
In November 2013, a complaint was filed with the Internal Revenue Service against HSUS by the Center for Consumer Freedom. According to Bloomberg News, the IRS complaint alleges that HSUS "violated IRS rules by listing as contributions the $17.7 million value of air time for its public service announcements to promote pet adoption. The net effect is to raise the ratio of program expenses to total expenses, which the independent assessor Charity Navigator uses to rank the effectiveness of charities." According to Bloomberg News, a tax attorney claims that the "Humane Society shouldn't count the public service air time as contributions."

=== Meat packing investigation ===
US Agriculture Secretary Ed Schafer questioned the way HSUS handled its Westland/Hallmark Meat Packing Company investigation, stating that HSUS "sat on four months of production that went out into the marketplace that's now being recalled". More recently, the debate over forcing animal welfare organizations to release information about cruelty within a specified period of time has prompted criticism from editorial boards and journalists skeptical of the motivations for such calls.

=== Michael Vick controversy ===
The football player Michael Vick was sentenced to prison for running a dogfighting ring; he was found to have buried dogs alive, drowned them, beaten them to death, and pulled out their teeth without anesthetic. After he had completed his sentence, Vick offered to volunteer his time to an HSUS campaign against dogfighting. Wayne Pacelle's acceptance of Vick's offer and willingness to appear in public and be photographed alongside Vick caused outrage and led one organization with the words "Humane Society" in its name to stress its non-affiliation with the HSUS. Sports Illustrated magazine published a major investigative cover story about Vick's dogs, and what happened to them after they were seized. The writer, Jim Gorant, was highly critical of the HSUS's immediate call for the pit bulls to be euthanized. Gorant went on to document the animals' rehabilitation, and how one went on to become a therapy dog in a hospital. In 2010, during an interview, Pacelle pointed out that Vick could own a dog "two or three years down the line" after his sentence was completed. Pacelle toured schools with Vick, in the HSUS campaign against dogfighting, and was quoted as saying, "I have been around him a lot, and feel confident that he would do a good job as a pet owner." Vick's sentence did not include a lifetime ban on owning pets, and Pacelle issued a blog post explaining his stance on Vick as a potential dog owner.

In October 2012, Michael Vick acquired a pet dog, purchased from a breeder. Additional controversy surrounded the report that HSUS had received a $50,000 grant from Michael Vick's team, the Philadelphia Eagles. The Eagles' donation was made as part of the 2009 launch of its "Treating Animals With Kindness" (TAWK) program, which provides grants to animal welfare organizations to protect animals: HSUS received a $50,000 grant, used to launch anti-dogfighting and community intervention programs in Philadelphia. In April 2011, Vick joined HSUS in denouncing the android App "Dog Wars", which involved a simulation of animal fighting. In July 2011, he lobbied on Capitol Hill for passage of the Animal Fighting Spectator Provision Act. Animal fighting experts generally agree that since the Vick case, there has been a significant strengthening of anti-cruelty laws at the state level, making it easier to prosecute wrongdoers.

Some have accused HSUS of a misleading fundraising pitch in relation to the Michael Vick dog fighting case. Fundraising material on HSUS's website one day after Vick's indictment states that donations will be used to "help the Humane Society of the United States care for the dogs seized in the Michael Vick case" and that donations would be "put to use right away to care for these dogs." It was later revealed that the dogs were not in the care of HSUS and that the group recommended the dogs be euthanized. The donation pitch was altered to remove references to caring for Vick's dogs one week after the initial pitch.

=== Misrepresentations of Canadian seafood boycott participation ===
In 2006, CCF conducted an informal poll of restaurants listed as boycotting Canadian seafood in protest of the slaughter of seals. CCF claims that 62% of the chefs and restaurant managers they spoke to on the phone were unaware that their companies were listed as "boycotters" on the HSUS website. In its report, CCF excluded those restaurants that were boycotting Canadian seafood prior to the HSUS boycott, and restaurants that serve any Canadian seafood (regardless of the type or quantity), and drew the conclusion that 78% of the interviewees were not actively participating in the boycott. CCF quotes Loyola Hearn, Canadian Minister of Fisheries and Oceans, as saying: "Some animal rights groups have been misleading the public for years ... it's no surprise at all that the richest of them would mislead the public with a phony seafood boycott."

=== Oklahoma Attorney General Issues Alert ===
In March 2014 Oklahoma Attorney General Scott Pruitt issued a consumer alert regarding HSUS and other national animal organizations. Pruitt stated that his office had received complaints about HSUS misleading donors following the 2013 Moore tornado.

=== Position on horse slaughter ===
Veterinarians for Equine Welfare (VEW) and the American Veterinary Medical Association (AVMA) have criticized HSUS and other organizations who lobbied for an end to horse slaughter in the United States, stating that instead of making things better, "horses are being abandoned in the United States or transported to Mexico where, without U.S. federal oversight and veterinary supervision, they are slaughtered inhumanely."

=== Other criticisms ===
1% of the group's budget goes directly to shelters, and in recent years, HSUS has taken criticism for not dispersing enough money, in ratio to what it receives from memberships and donations, to local humane societies and shelters, though the HSUS webpage states they are unaffiliated with local shelters.

== Animal Charity Evaluators review ==
Animal charity evaluator Animal Charity Evaluators recommended the Humane Society of the United States' Farm Animal Protection Campaign as a Standout Charity between May 2014 and February 2018. ACE designates as Standout Charities those organizations which they do not feel are as strong as their Top Charities, but which excel in at least one way and are exceptionally strong compared to animal charities in general.

In their November 2016 review of the HSUS Farm Animal Protection Campaign, ACE cited their strengths as their large reach, strategic approach, and long track record of legal work, corporate outreach, and meat reduction programs. ACE stated that their primary concern with the Farm Animal Protection Campaign was that it was unclear the extent to which their budget comes from the HSUS general budget, and whether small donations to the Farm Animal Protection Campaign would be fungible with other HSUS activities.

In February 2018, ACE rescinded their recommendation of the HSUS Farm Animal Protection Campaign following allegations of misconduct from both the former president of HSUS and the former vice president of the Farm Animal Protection Campaign. This rescission was made because ACE believes strong, ethical leadership and a healthy work environment are critical components of an effective charity.

== See also ==
- American Humane (AH)
- Animal Welfare Institute (AWI)
