= World Spay Day =

Day advocating neutering

World Spay Day advocates spaying, or neutering, advocating it "as a proven means of saving the lives of companion animals, community (feral and stray) cats, and street dogs who might otherwise be put down in a shelter or killed on the street." It is an event held on the last Tuesday in February each year.

== History ==
The event first started as Spay Day USA, an annual event created by Doris Day and the Doris Day Animal League (DDAL) in 1995, to promote spays and neuters across the country to help the problem of homeless pets. After the DDAL's merger with the Humane Society of the United States (HSUS) in 2006, the tradition continued under the auspices of the HSUS as World Spay Day.

In 2002, the event's goal was to spay and neuter 200,000 pets across the United States.

The Doris Day Animal Foundation (DDAF) reports that since 2008, they have granted HSUS $385,000 for spays and neuters of 9,421 animals in 39 states: 6388 cats, 3007 dogs, and 26 rabbits. Many other organizations and individuals worldwide provide financial support, volunteer and participate in fundraising activities to promote World Spay Day.

For World Spay Day 2024, the Found Animals Foundation donated $1 million to Community Animal Medicine Project clinics in Southern California.

== World Spay Day events in 2014 ==
In 2014, 700 World Spay Day events were held in 41 countries, including all 50 U.S. states, and over 68,000 companion animals were sterilized.

In Canada, World Spay Day in February 2014 included spay and neuter clinics in remote communities in northern Quebec, with additional clinics to follow. In Halifax, Nova Scotia, a clinic sterilizing 25 cats brought the total number of cats sterilized by new low cost clinic to over 2000. The Canadian Federation of Humane Societies used the 2014 World Spay Day to announce the publication of a report, The Case for Accessible Spay/Neuter in Canada, which "illuminates the lack of accessible spay/neuter in communities across the country and what can be done about it."
