= List of awards and nominations received by Doris Day =

This is a list of awards and nominations for Doris Day.

== Film and television awards ==
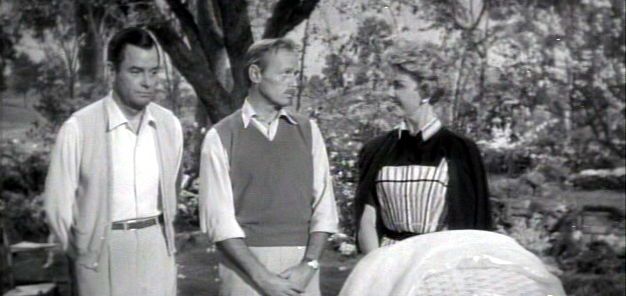
Gig Young, Richard Widmark, and Day in The Tunnel of Love (1958)

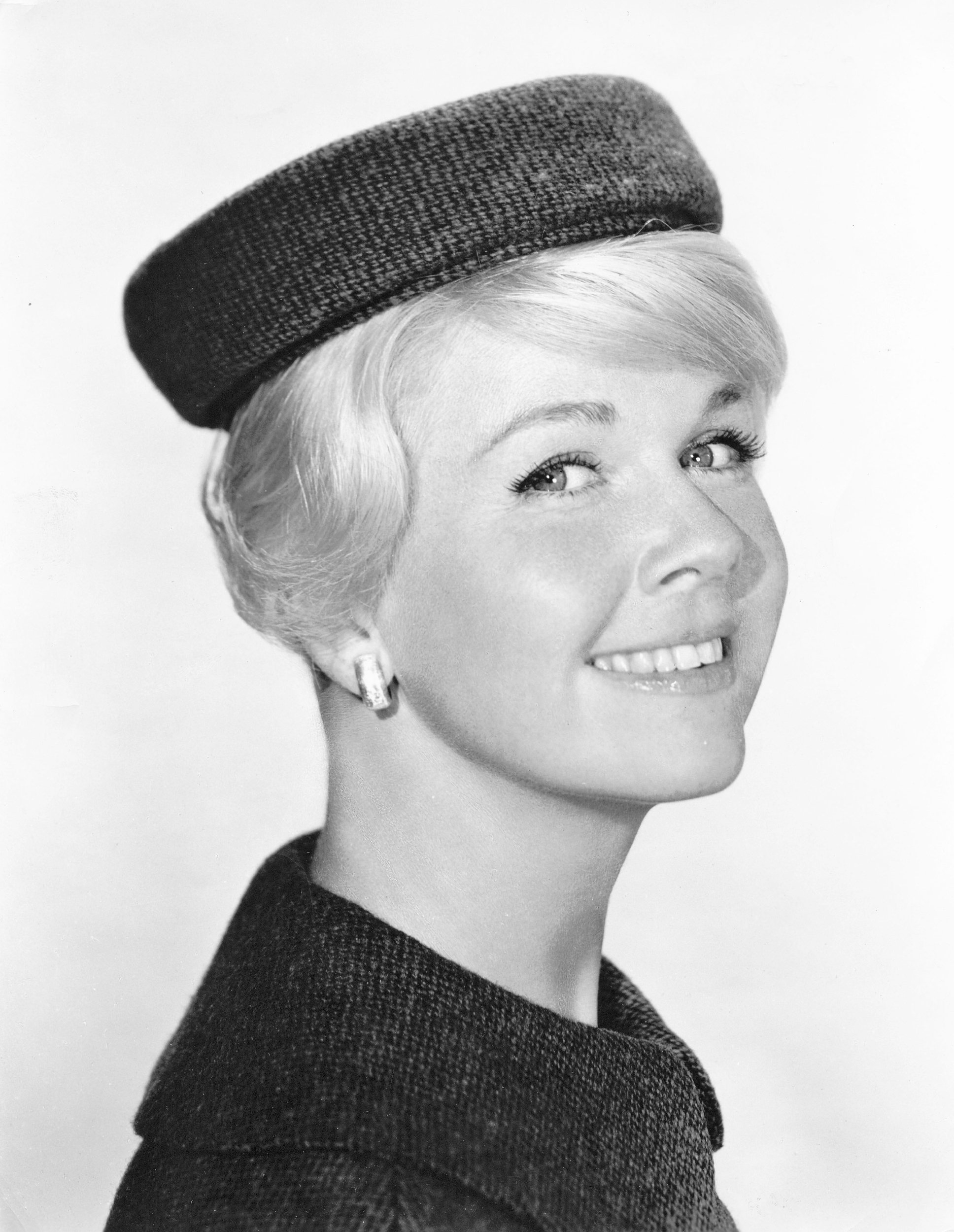
Day in Midnight Lace (1960)

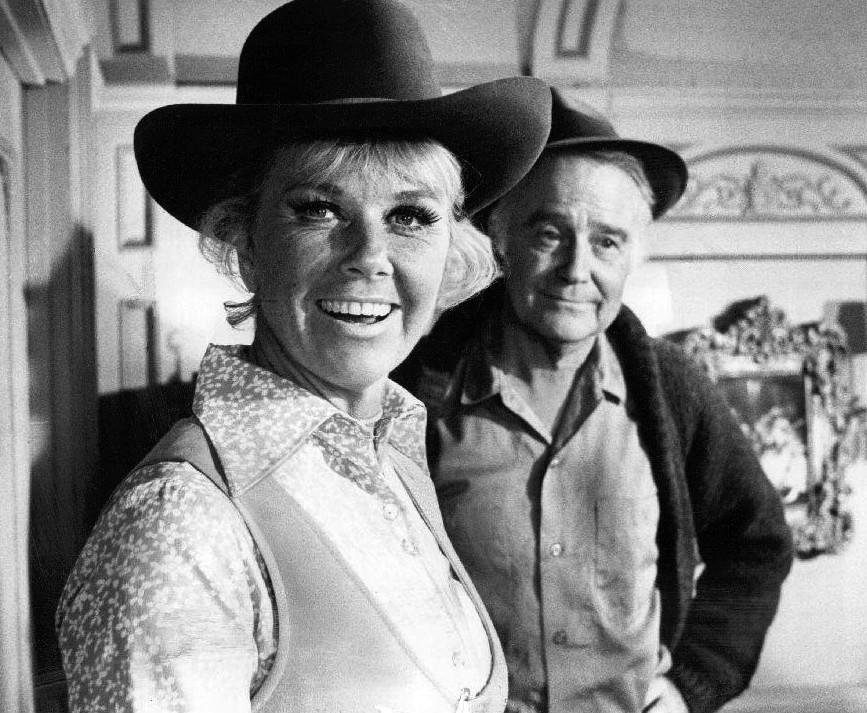
Day with Lew Ayres on The Doris Day Show (1970)

=== Academy Awards ===
Year	Nominee / work	Award	Result
1960	Pillow Talk	Best Actress	Nominated

=== American Comedy Awards ===
Year	Nominee / work	Award	Result
1991	Herself	Lifetime Achievement Award	Won

=== Golden Globe Awards ===
Year	Nominee / work	Award	Result
1955	Herself	Henrietta Award (World Film Favorite – Female)	Nominated
1958	Herself	Henrietta Award (World Film Favorite – Female)	Won
1959	The Tunnel of Love	Actress in a Leading Role – Musical or Comedy	Nominated
1960	Pillow Talk	Actress in a Leading Role – Musical or Comedy	Nominated
1960	Herself	Henrietta Award (World Film Favorite – Female)	Won
1961	Midnight Lace	Best Performance by an Actress in a Motion Picture – Drama	Nominated
1963	Billy Rose's Jumbo	Actress in a Leading Role – Musical or Comedy	Nominated
1963	Herself	Henrietta Award (World Film Favorite – Female)	Won
1964	Move Over, Darling	Actress in a Leading Role – Musical or Comedy	Nominated
1966	Herself	Henrietta Award (World Film Favorite – Female)	Nominated
1969	The Doris Day Show	Actress in a Television Series	Nominated
1989	Herself	Cecil B. DeMille Award	Won

=== Laurel Awards ===
Year	Nominee / work	Award	Result
1950	Herself	Leading New Female Personality	Won
1957	Herself	Top Female Star	Won
1958	Herself	Top Female Star	Won
1959	Herself	Top Female Star	Won
1960	Herself	Top Female Star	Won
1960	Pillow Talk	Top Female Comedy Performance	Won
1961	Herself	Top Female Star	Won
1962	Herself	Top Female Star	Won
1962	Lover Come Back	Top Female Comedy Performance	Won
1963	Herself	Top Female Star	Won
1963	That Touch of Mink	Top Female Comedy Performance	Won
1964	Herself	Top Female Star	Won
1965	Send Me No Flowers	Top Female Comedy Performance	Won

=== Los Angeles Film Critics Association Awards ===
Year	Nominee / work	Award	Result
2011	Herself	Career Achievement Award	Won

== Music awards ==
=== Grammy Awards ===
Year	Nominee / work	Award	Result
2009	Herself	Grammy Lifetime Achievement Award	Won
1960	Herself	Best Vocal Performance Single Record or Track Female for "The Sound of Music"	Nominated
1958	Herself	Best Vocal Performance Female for "Everybody loves a Lover"	Nominated

=== Grammy Hall of Fame ===
Year	Nominee / work	Award	Result
1998	"Sentimental Journey"	Inducted Song	Won
1999	"Secret Love"	Inducted Song	Won
2012	"Que Sera, Sera (Whatever Will Be, Will Be)"	Inducted Song	Won
