= Thoughtless (Doris Day song) =

Single by Doris Day with The Modernaires
- Released: December 29, 1947
- Songwriters: Carl Lampl, Buddy Kaye

"Thoughtless" is a 1947 song by Doris Day with The Modernaires under the direction of George Siravo. The song was written by Carl G. Lampl, who wrote Sinatra's "Close to You", and Buddy Kaye. It was released on December 29, 1947 and went to #24 in the US charts. The lyrics begin "You are so thoughtless of me".

Others to reach the lower reaches of the Billboard charts in 1948 were recordings by Gordon MacRae, The Buddy Kaye Quintet, Guy Lombardo & His Royal Canadians (vocal by Don Rodney) and Vic Damone.
