= Mister Tap Toe =

Single by Doris Day
- B-side: "Your Mother and Mine"
- Released: December 5, 1952
- Genre: Big band
- Length: 2:13
- Label: Columbia; 39906
- Songwriter(s): Terry Gilkyson, Richard Dehr, Frank Miller

Doris Day singles chronology
"Ma Says, Pa Says" (November 21, 1952)	"Mister Tap Toe" (1952)	"When the Red, Red Robin (Comes Bob, Bob, Bobbin' Along)" (March 27, 1953)

"Mister Tap Toe" is a song written by Terry Gilkyson, Richard Dehr, and Frank Miller and performed by Doris Day featuring the Norman Luboff Choir. In 1953, the track reached No. 10 on the US chart.

== Other Versions ==
- Eddie "Piano" Miller released a version of the song as the B-side to his 1951 single "Bill Bailey, Won't You Please Come Home".
