= United States Association of Reptile Keepers =

American animal welfare nonprofit organization

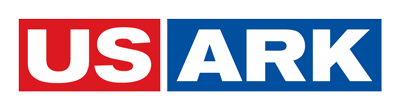
- Founded: 2008
- Type: 501(c)(6)
- Purpose: Animal welfare, Animal law, Wildlife conservation, Herpetoculture and Herpetology
- Method: public education, science-based analysis, media outreach, litigation, legislation, public policy
- Key people: Phil Goss (President)
- Website: usark.org

The United States Association of Reptile Keepers (USARK) is a 501(c)(6) nonprofit organization. USARK describes itself as "a science, education and conservation based advocacy (organization) for the responsible private ownership of, and trade in reptiles."

== Founding ==
USARK was founded in 2008 to protect reptile keepers and breeders from an increasingly restrictive regulatory environment. USARK is credited with pioneering advocacy for herpetoculture (the keeping and propagation under human care of reptiles and amphibians). In the early years, USARK developed a large grassroots component known as the "Reptile Nation." In February 2013, Phil Goss was appointed president of USARK.

President Phil Goss stated in an interview that every American should have the right to own any reptile, but not every person should own one. "Be prepared and willing to accept the responsibilities of any reptile you buy for his entire life."

== Position statements ==
On conservation, USARK recommends approaches to maintaining the biodiversity of reptiles and amphibians that involve breeding in captivity. Also suggested are maintaining deep-freeze DNA repositories and seed banks. USARK endorses "caging standards, sound husbandry, escape prevention protocols, and an integrated approach to vital conservation issues."

USARK also outlines Best Management Practices for reptile shows, public health, and public safety.
