= Listen to Day =

Studio album by Doris Day
- Released: 1960
- Genre: Traditional pop; jazz
- Length: 28:30
- Label: Columbia

Doris Day chronology
Cuttin' Capers (1960)	Listen to Day (1960)	What Every Girl Should Know (1960)

Listen to Day is a 1960 album by the American singer Doris Day. The album mostly consists of Day's singles from the 1950s.

In March 1960 Billboard magazine reported that Columbia Records was declaring April of that year 'Doris Day Month' and had released Listen to Day as a limited release available with every purchase of Day's album What Every Girl Should Know. Allmusic rated the album 3 stars out of 5.

It peaked at number 26 on the Billboard album chart. Day's biographer Tom Santopietro described Listen to Day as a "mixed bag" that was "hastily put together to capitalize on Day's extraordinary popularity" and that it featured "too many mediocre songs".

== Track listing ==
1. "Pillow Talk" (Buddy Pepper, Inez James) – 2:10
2. "Heart Full of Love" (Albert Beach, Guy Wood) – 2:42
3. "Anyway the Wind Blows" (Joseph Hooven, Marilyn Hooven, William D. "By" Dunham – 2:20
4. "Oh! What a Lover You'll Be" (J. Hooven, M. Hooven) – 2:10
5. "No" (Lee Pockriss, P. J. Vance) – 2:05
6. "Love Me in the Daytime" (Bob Hillard, Robert Allen) – 2:46
7. "I Enjoy Being a Girl" (Oscar Hammerstein II, Richard Rodgers) – 2:35
8. "Tunnel of Love" (Bob Roberts, Patty Fisher) – 2:10
9. "He's So Married" (Jimmy Dodd, Will Fowler) – 2:22
10. "Roly Poly" (Sol Lake and Elsa Doran) – 2:15
11. "Possess Me" (Irving Roth, Joe Lubin) – 2:50
12. "Inspiration" (Roth, Lubin) – 2:05

== Personnel ==
- Doris Day – vocals
- Frank DeVol, Jack Marshall – arranger

== Charts ==
Chart performance for Listen to Day
Chart (1960)	Peak position
US Billboard 200	26
