= My Heart (Doris Day album) =

Studio album by Doris Day
- Released: September 5, 2011
- Recorded: Mid-1980s
- Length: 43:59
- Label: Sony Music (Europe); Arwin (US)
- Producer: Ted Carfrae, Terry Melcher, Bruce Johnston

Doris Day chronology
The Love Album (1994)	My Heart (2011)

Professional ratings
Review scores
Source	Rating
AllMusic	3.5/5 stars

My Heart is the 29th and final studio album by Doris Day, released on September 5, 2011. On September 11, 2011 the album entered the UK chart at number nine, making Doris Day, at age 89, the oldest artist to score a UK Top 10 with an album featuring new material.

Eight of the songs are new releases, with three of them written by Day's son Terry Melcher, and Bruce Johnston. Many of the songs on this collection were recorded in the mid-1980s for her Doris Day's Best Friends television show. The songs were meant to be used as background music for segments featuring Doris and the animals. When the original recordings were retrieved, it was decided that they should be released after being remixed for superior sound quality.

"My One and Only Love" had been issued on Day's 1962 album with André Previn, Duet, "Life Is Just a Bowl of Cherries" had been issued on The Love Album (1994), "My Buddy" had been issued on I'll See You in My Dreams (1951) and "Ohio" was issued first on 1960s Show Time.

The track "My Heart" was first heard in the 1993 PBS special Doris Day: A Sentimental Journey. It played over the closing credits as Doris was seen walking with her grandson on the beach.

My Heart was released on December 2, 2011 in the U.S. It was Day's first entry on the Billboard 200 albums chart in 47 years, debuting at #135. The U.S. release includes an exclusive bonus track, Stewball, a folk song about a racehorse. Doris selected this song personally for Stateside listeners. It is a duet with her late son, Terry Melcher. The CD also includes a song "Happy Endings" with an introduction by Doris Day, but with the main vocal sung by Melcher.

== Track listing ==
1. "Hurry, It's Lovely Up Here" (Alan Jay Lerner, Burton Lane) – 2:16
2. "Daydream" (John Sebastian) – 3:17
3. "The Way I Dreamed It" (Bruce Johnston, Terry Melcher) – 3:26
4. "Heaven Tonight" (Bruce Johnston) – 3:23
5. "My One and Only Love" (Guy Wood, Robert Mellin) – 3:39
6. "My Heart" (Bruce Johnston, Terry Melcher) – 4:25
7. "You Are So Beautiful" (Billy Preston, Bruce Fisher) – 2:24
8. "Life Is Just a Bowl of Cherries" (Ray Henderson, Lew Brown) – 2:55
9. "Disney Girls" (Bruce Johnston) – 4:32
10. "Stewball" (on US release only) (Traditional, arranged by Terry Melcher) – 4:08
11. "My Buddy" (Walter Donaldson, Gus Kahn) – 3:12
12. "Happy Endings" (Bruce Johnston, Terry Melcher) (intro by Doris Day, sung by Terry Melcher) – 4:26
13. "Ohio" (Betty Comden, Adolph Green, Leonard Bernstein) – 3:04

== Musicians ==
- Troy Luccketta – drums
- James Baker – piano
- Bob Marinelli – bass guitar
- James Scott – guitar

== Charts ==
Chart (2011)	Peak position
Austrian Albums (Ö3 Austria)	22
Dutch Albums (Album Top 100)	86
German Albums (Offizielle Top 100)	45
Swiss Albums (Schweizer Hitparade)	73
UK Albums (OCC)	9
US Billboard 200	135
