= Doris Day Animal League =

The Doris Day Animal League was an animal advocacy group based in Washington, D.C. It established the annual observance Spay Day USA in 1994, which the group uses to bring attention to the pet overpopulation problem in the United States. In 2021, the Doris Day Animal League (DDAL) merged with the Humane Society Legislative Fund.
