= Doris Day =

American actress and singer (1922–2019)

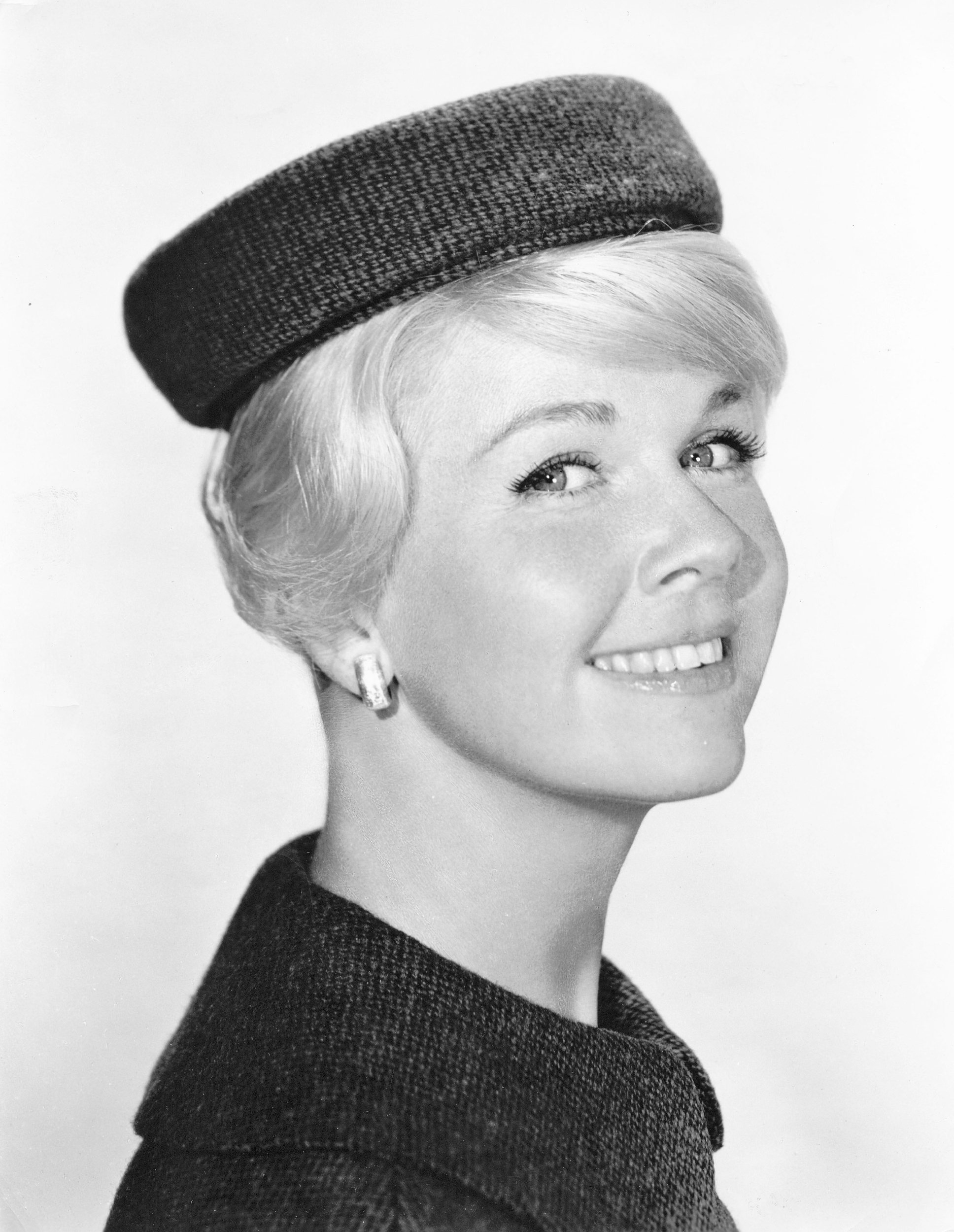
- Day in a publicity portrait, 1960
- Born: Doris Mary Anne Kappelhoff; April 3, 1922; Cincinnati, Ohio, U.S.
- Died: May 13, 2019 (aged 97); Carmel Valley, California, U.S.
- Occupations: Actress; singer
- Years active: 1937–2012
- Spouses: Al Jorden (m. 1941; div. 1943) George Weidler (m. 1946; div. 1949) Martin Melcher (m. 1951; died 1968) Barry Comden (m. 1976; div. 1982)
- Children: Terry Melcher
- Awards: Full list
- Musical career
- Genres: Pop; jazz
- Instrument: Vocals
- Label: Columbia
- Website: dorisday.com

Doris Day (born Doris Mary Anne Kappelhoff; April 3, 1922 – May 13, 2019) was an American actress and singer. With an entertainment career that spanned 75 years, Day was one of the most popular and acclaimed female singers of the 1940s and 1950s, with a parallel career as a leading actress in Hollywood films, where she became one of the biggest box-office stars of the 1960s. She was known for her on-screen girl next door image and her distinctive singing voice.

Day began her career as a big band singer in 1937, achieving commercial success in 1945 with two No. 1 recordings, "Sentimental Journey" and "My Dreams Are Getting Better All the Time" with Les Brown and His Band of Renown. She left Brown to embark on a solo career and recorded more than 650 songs from 1947 to 1967. Her recording of "Que Sera, Sera (Whatever Will Be, Will Be)" became known as her signature song and was inducted into the Grammy Hall of Fame in 2011.

Day made her film debut with the musical Romance on the High Seas (1948). She played the title role in the musical Calamity Jane (1953) and starred in the thriller The Man Who Knew Too Much (1956). She co-starred with Rock Hudson in three successful comedies: Pillow Talk (1959), for which she was nominated for the Academy Award for Best Actress, Lover Come Back (1961) and Send Me No Flowers (1964). Day also worked with actor James Garner on both Move Over, Darling (1963) and The Thrill of It All (1963). After ending her film career in 1968, she starred in her own television sitcom The Doris Day Show (1968–1973).

In 1989, Day was awarded the Golden Globe and the Cecil B. DeMille Award for Lifetime Achievement in Motion Pictures. In 2004, she was awarded the Presidential Medal of Freedom. In 2008, she received the Grammy Lifetime Achievement Award as well as a Legend Award from the Society of Singers. In 2011, she was awarded the Los Angeles Film Critics Association's Career Achievement Award. As of 2020, Day was one of eight recording artists to have been the top box-office earner in the United States four times. Day was a prominent advocate for animal welfare and founded the advocacy group Doris Day Animal League (DDAL) and the non-profit organization Doris Day Pet Foundation, now the Doris Day Animal Foundation (DDAF).

== Early life ==
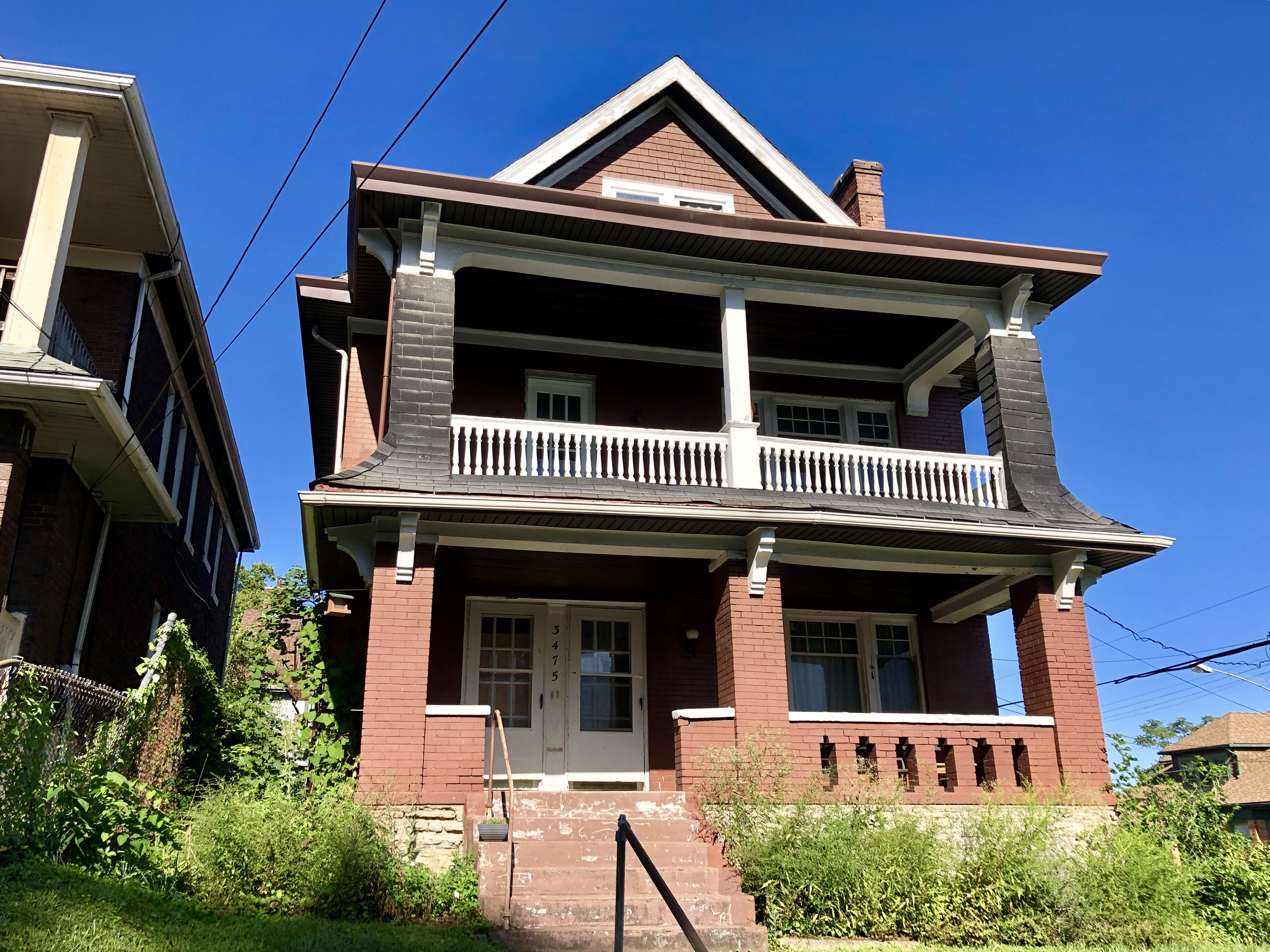
Childhood home in Cincinnati

Day was born Doris Mary Anne Kappelhoff on April 3, 1922, in Cincinnati, Ohio, the daughter of German-American parents Alma Sophia (née Welz; 1895–1976) and William Joseph Kappelhoff (1892–1967). She was named after actress Doris Kenyon. Her mother was a homemaker, and her father was a music teacher and choirmaster. Her paternal grandfather Franz Joseph Wilhelm Kappelhoff immigrated to the United States in 1875 and settled within the large German community in Cincinnati. For most of her life, Day stated that she was born in 1924, but on the occasion of her 95th birthday, the Associated Press found her birth certificate that showed a 1922 year of birth.

Day had two older brothers: Richard (1917–1919), who died before her birth, and Paul (1919–1957). Her father's infidelity caused her parents to separate in 1932 when she was 10. She developed an early interest in dance, and in the mid-1930s formed a dance duo with Jerry Doherty that performed in nationwide competitions. She had signed a contract with a casting company to be a dancer and she was preparing to move to Los Angeles to pursue this opportunity. Family friends that lived just north of Cincinnati, in Hamilton, Ohio, planned a going-away party for her, but tragedy struck on her way to the party. On October 13, 1937, while Day was riding with friends, their car collided with a freight train, and she broke her right leg, curtailing her prospects as a professional dancer.

== Career ==
=== Early career (1938–1947) ===
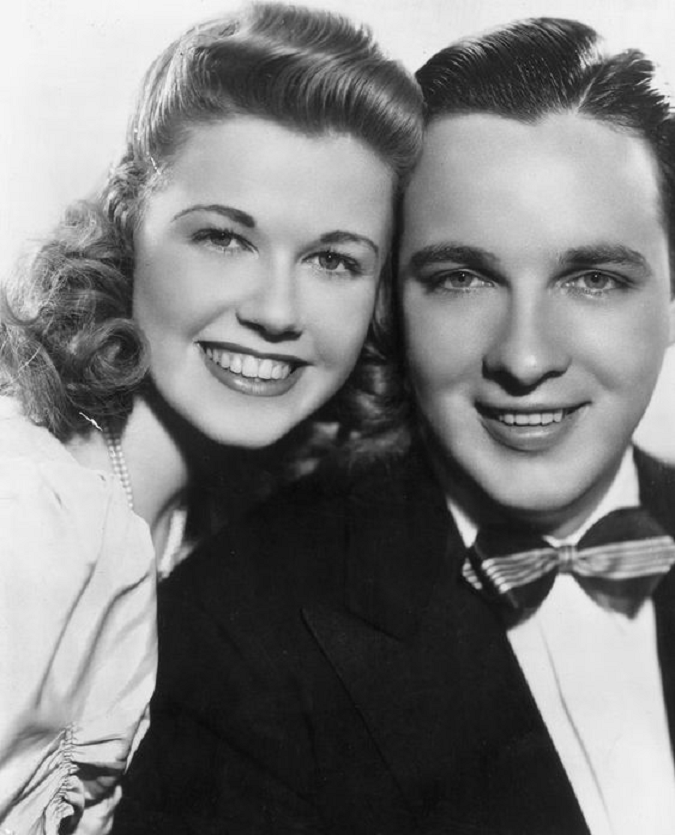
Day and Bob Crosby (1940)

While recovering from her car accident, Day sang along with the radio and discovered her singing talent. She later said: "During this long, boring period, I used to while away a lot of time listening to the radio, sometimes singing along with the likes of Benny Goodman, Duke Ellington, Tommy Dorsey, and Glenn Miller. But the one radio voice I listened to above others belonged to Ella Fitzgerald. There was a quality to her voice that fascinated me, and I'd sing along with her, trying to catch the subtle ways she shaded her voice, the casual yet clean way she sang the words."

Day's mother Alma arranged for Doris to receive singing lessons from Grace Raine. After three lessons, Raine told Alma that Day had "tremendous potential" and gave her three lessons per week for the price of one. Years later, Day said that Raine had a greater effect on her singing style and career than had anyone else.

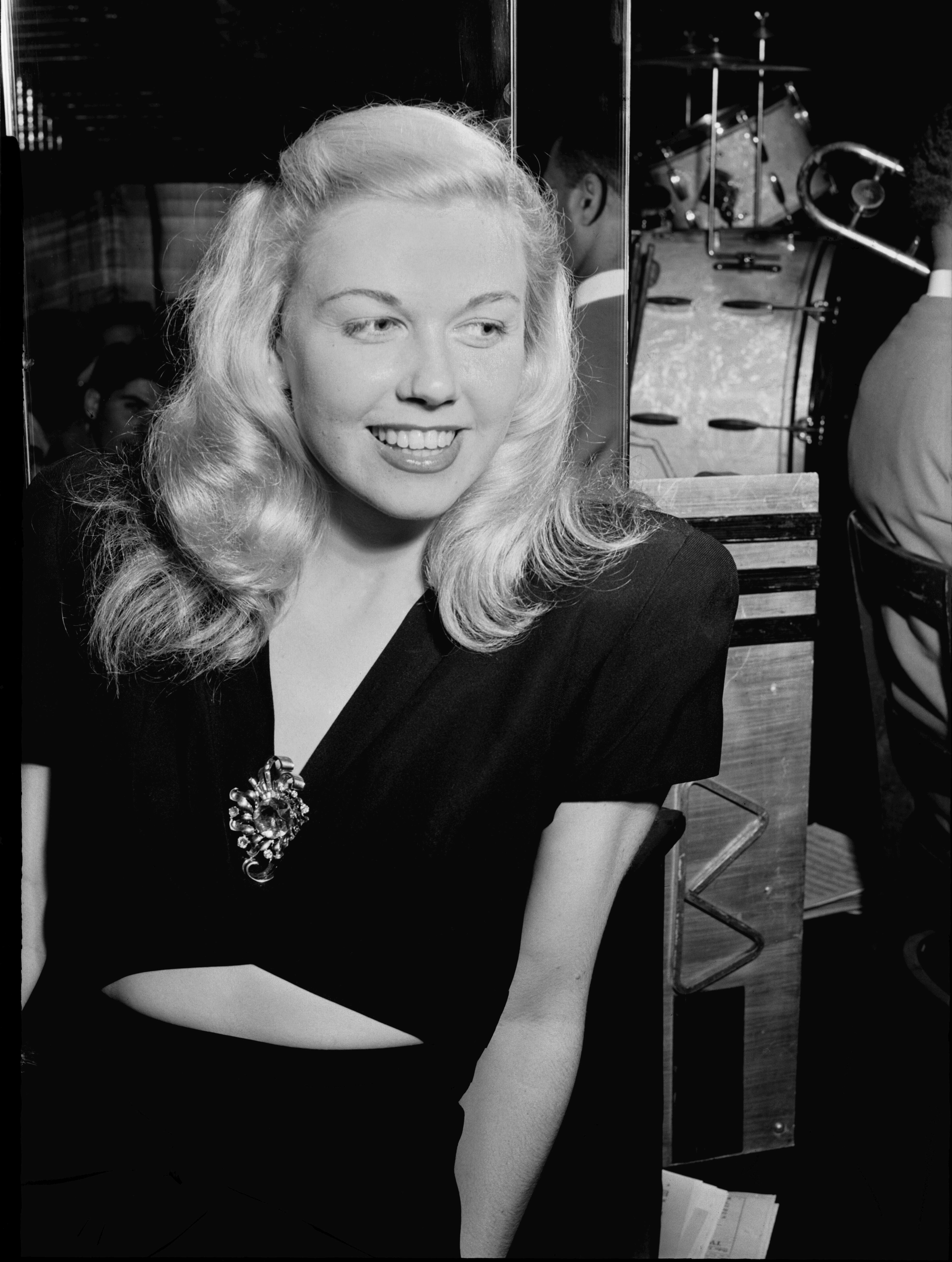
Day at the Aquarium Jazz Club, New York (1946)

During the eight months when she was receiving singing lessons, Day secured her first professional jobs as a vocalist on the WLW radio program Carlin's Carnival and in a local restaurant, Charlie Yee's Shanghai Inn. During her radio performances, she first caught the attention of Barney Rapp, who was seeking a female vocalist and asked her to audition for the job. According to Rapp, he had auditioned about 200 other singers.

In 1939, Rapp suggested the stage name Doris Day because the Kappelhoff surname was too long for marquees and he admired her rendition of the song "Day After Day". While working with Rapp, she sang for his band, the New Englanders, and was paid $50* per day; her manager stole half. (*Around $1,200 a day in today's money).

After working with Rapp, Day worked with bandleaders Jimmy James, Bob Crosby and Les Brown. In 1941, Day appeared as a singer in three Soundies with the Les Brown band.

While working with Brown, Day recorded her first hit recording, "Sentimental Journey", released in early 1945 and which went to #1 on the Billboard. It soon became an anthem for World War II servicemen. The song continues to be associated with Day, and she rerecorded it on several occasions, including a version for her 1971 television special. During 1945–46, Day (as vocalist with the Les Brown Band) had six other top ten hits on the Billboard chart: "My Dreams Are Getting Better All the Time", "'Tain't Me", "Till the End of Time", "You Won't Be Satisfied (Until You Break My Heart)", "The Whole World Is Singing My Song", and "I Got the Sun in the Mornin'". Les Brown said, "As a singer Doris belongs in the company of Bing Crosby and Frank Sinatra."

=== Early film career (1948–1954) ===
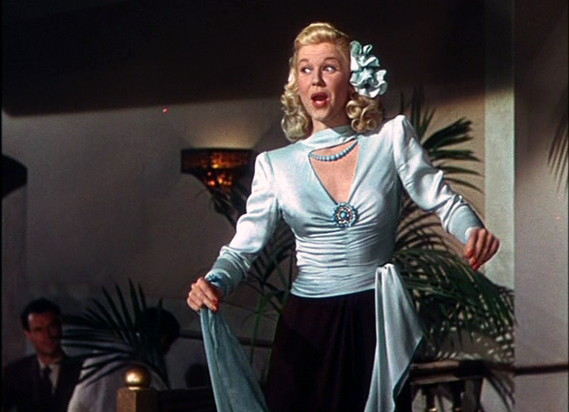
Day as Georgia Garrett in Romance on the High Seas, singing "I'm in Love". (1948)

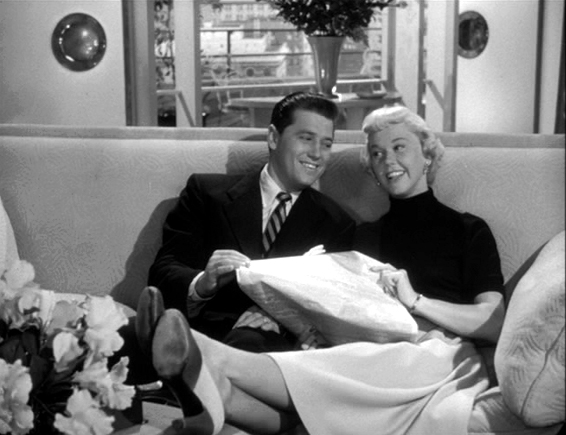
Gordon MacRae and Day in Starlift (1951)

While singing with the Les Brown band and for nearly two years on Bob Hope's weekly radio program, Day toured extensively across the United States as the era of big bands had given way to solo pop singers.

Her performance of the song "Embraceable You" impressed songwriter Jule Styne and his partner Sammy Cahn, and they recommended her for a role in Romance on the High Seas (1948). Day was cast for the role after auditioning for director Michael Curtiz. She was shocked to receive the offer and admitted to Curtiz that she was a singer without acting experience but he appreciated her honesty and felt that "her freckles made her look like the All-American Girl."

The film provided her with a No. 2 hit recording as a soloist, "It's Magic", which occurred two months after her hit "Love Somebody", a duet with Buddy Clark and they would have another hit shortly after that with a cover of Patti Page's "Confess." Her first solo hit was "Sentimental Journey" in 1945. Day recorded "Someone Like You" before the film My Dream Is Yours (1949), which featured the song. In 1950, she collaborated as a singer with the polka musician Frankie Yankovic, and the U.S. servicemen in Korea voted her their favorite star.

Her heyday as a hitmaker was from 1948 to 1951 when she placed 15 songs on the Billboard Hot 30 list and was one of the top female pop vocalists, competing with rivals such as Dinah Shore, Jo Stafford, and Patti Page.

Day continued to appear in light musicals such as On Moonlight Bay (1951), By the Light of the Silvery Moon (1953) and Tea For Two (1950) for Warner Bros.

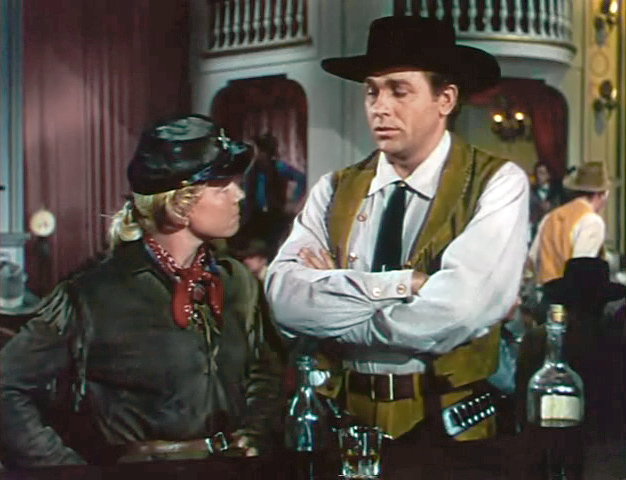
Day with Howard Keel in Calamity Jane (1953)

Her most commercially successful film for Warner Bros. was I'll See You in My Dreams (1951), a musical biography of lyricist Gus Kahn that broke box-office records of 20 years. It was Day's fourth film directed by Curtiz. She appeared as the title character in the comedic western-themed musical Calamity Jane (1953). A song from the film, "Secret Love", won the Academy Award for Best Original Song and became Day's fourth No. 1 hit single in the United States.

Between 1950 and 1953, the albums from six of her film musicals charted in the Top 10, including three that reached No. 1. After filming Lucky Me (1954) with Bob Cummings and Young at Heart (1955) with Frank Sinatra, Day elected to not renew her contract with Warner Brothers.

During this period, Day also had her own radio program, The Doris Day Show. It was broadcast on CBS in 1952–1953.

=== Breakthrough (1955–1958) ===
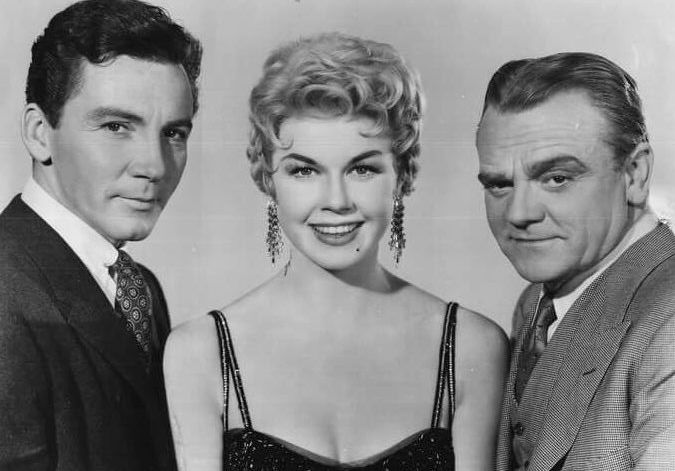
Cameron Mitchell, Day and James Cagney in a publicity still for Love Me or Leave Me (1955)

Primarily recognized as a musical-comedy actress, Day began to accept more dramatic roles in order to broaden her range. Her dramatic star turn as singer Ruth Etting in Love Me or Leave Me (1955), with top billing above James Cagney, received critical and commercial success, becoming Day's greatest film success to that point. Cagney said that she had "the ability to project the simple, direct statement of a simple, direct idea without cluttering it," comparing her performance to that of Laurette Taylor in the Broadway production The Glass Menagerie (1945). Day felt that it was her best film performance. The film's producer Joe Pasternak said, "I was stunned that Doris did not get an Oscar nomination." The film's soundtrack album became a No. 1 hit.

In 1956, Day starred in Alfred Hitchcock's suspense film The Man Who Knew Too Much opposite James Stewart. She sang two songs in the film, "Que Sera, Sera (Whatever Will Be, Will Be)", which won an Academy Award for Best Original Song, and "We'll Love Again". The film was Day's 10th to reach the top 10 at the box office. She played the title role in the film noir thriller Julie (1956) with Louis Jourdan.

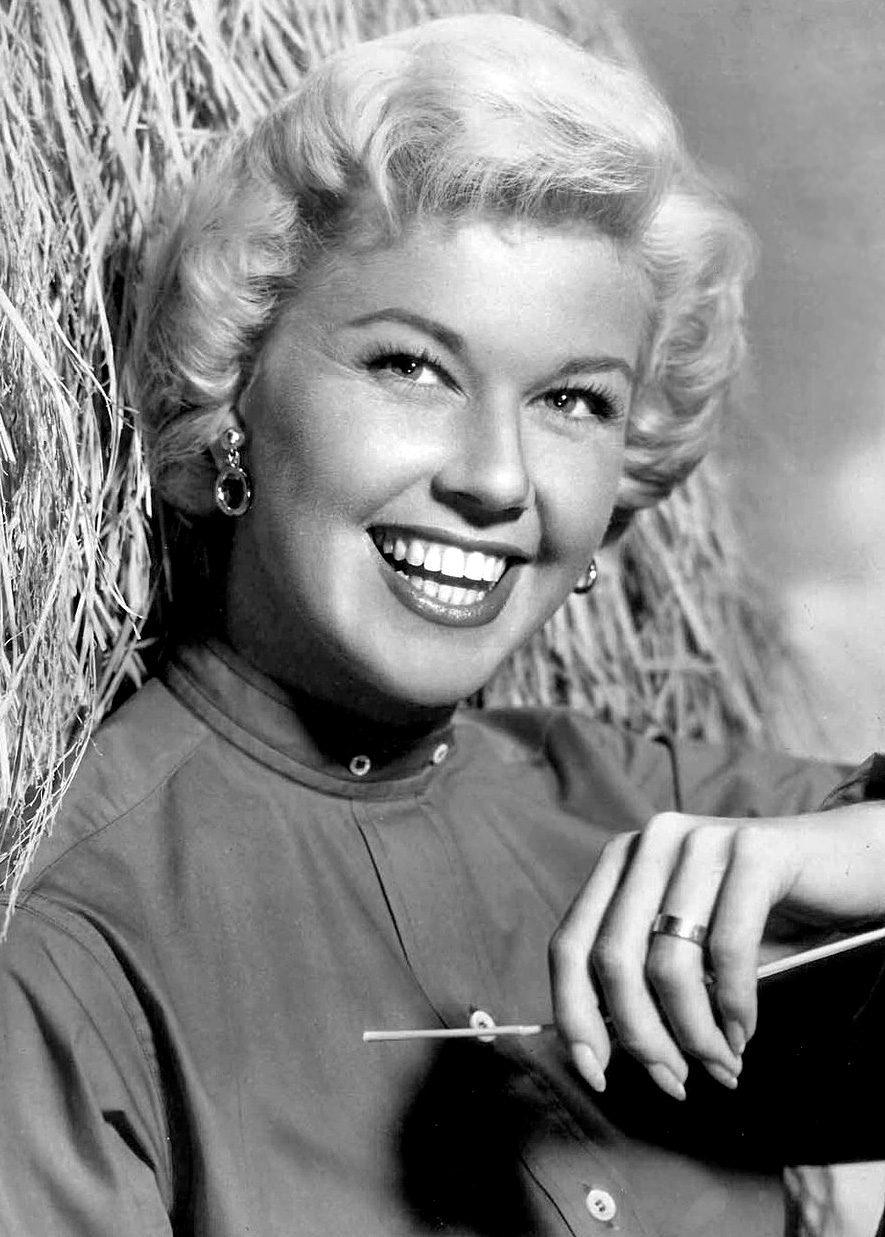
Publicity photo, 1957

After three successive dramatic films, Day returned to her musical/comedic roots in The Pajama Game (1957) with John Raitt, based on the Broadway play of the same name. She appeared in the Paramount comedy Teacher's Pet (1958) alongside Clark Gable and Gig Young. She costarred with Richard Widmark and Gig Young in the romantic comedy film The Tunnel of Love (1958) and with Jack Lemmon in It Happened to Jane (1959).

Billboard's annual nationwide poll of disc jockeys had ranked Day as the No. 1 female vocalist nine times in ten years (1949 through 1958), but her success and popularity as a singer was now being overshadowed by her box-office appeal. However, Day still had several more major hits over the '50s, including "Secret Love", "I'll Never Stop Loving You", and "Que Sera Sera (Whatever Will Be Will Be)" despite rock-and-roll reducing interest in older singers. The last charting single she had was "Lover Come Back" in 1962.

=== Box-office success (1959–1968) ===
In 1959, Day entered her most successful phase as a film actress with a series of romantic comedies beginning with Pillow Talk (1959), costarring Rock Hudson, who became a lifelong friend, and Tony Randall. Day received a nomination for an Academy Award for Best Actress, her only career Oscar nomination. Day, Hudson and Randall appeared in two more films together, Lover Come Back (1961) and Send Me No Flowers (1964).

Along with David Niven, Day starred in Please Don't Eat the Daisies (1960) and with Cary Grant in That Touch of Mink (1962). From 1960-1964, she ranked No. 1 at the box office four times, an accomplishment equalled by no other actress except Shirley Temple. Day also received the most Laurel Awards as the top female box-office star, winning seven consecutive awards, two more than the leading male star, Rock Hudson.

Day teamed with James Garner starting with The Thrill of It All, followed by Move Over, Darling (both 1963). The film's theme song "Move Over Darling", cowritten by her son, hit No. 8 in the UK. In addition to the comedies, Day costarred with Rex Harrison in the thriller Midnight Lace (1960), an update of the stage thriller Gaslight.

Day's next film Do Not Disturb (1965) did fairly well at the box office, but not enough to recoup its costs, and her popularity started to wane. By the late 1960s, in the midst of the Sexual Revolution, critics and comics dubbed her The World's Oldest Virgin. She slipped from the list of top box-office stars, last appearing in the top ten with The Glass Bottom Boat (1966). Among the roles she declined was that of Mrs. Robinson in The Graduate, a role that eventually went to Anne Bancroft. In her memoirs, Day wrote that she rejected the part on moral grounds, finding the script "vulgar and offensive."

In another sign of the times, Day was dropped from Columbia Records in 1965 when the label dismissed long-running pop division head Mitch Miller and hired new, young, rock-focused management, ending her active career as a recording artist.

Day starred in the Western The Ballad of Josie in 1967. That same year, she recorded The Love Album, which was not released until 1994. In 1968, she starred in Where Were You When the Lights Went Out? about the Northeast blackout of November 9, 1965. Her final feature, With Six You Get Eggroll, also released in 1968. It was a big hit, indicating she remained popular with the public.

From 1959 to 1970, Day received nine Laurel Award nominations (and won four times) for best female performance in eight comedies and one drama. From 1959 through 1969, she received six Golden Globe nominations for best female performance in three comedies, one drama (Midnight Lace), one musical (Jumbo) and her television series.

=== Bankruptcy and television career ===
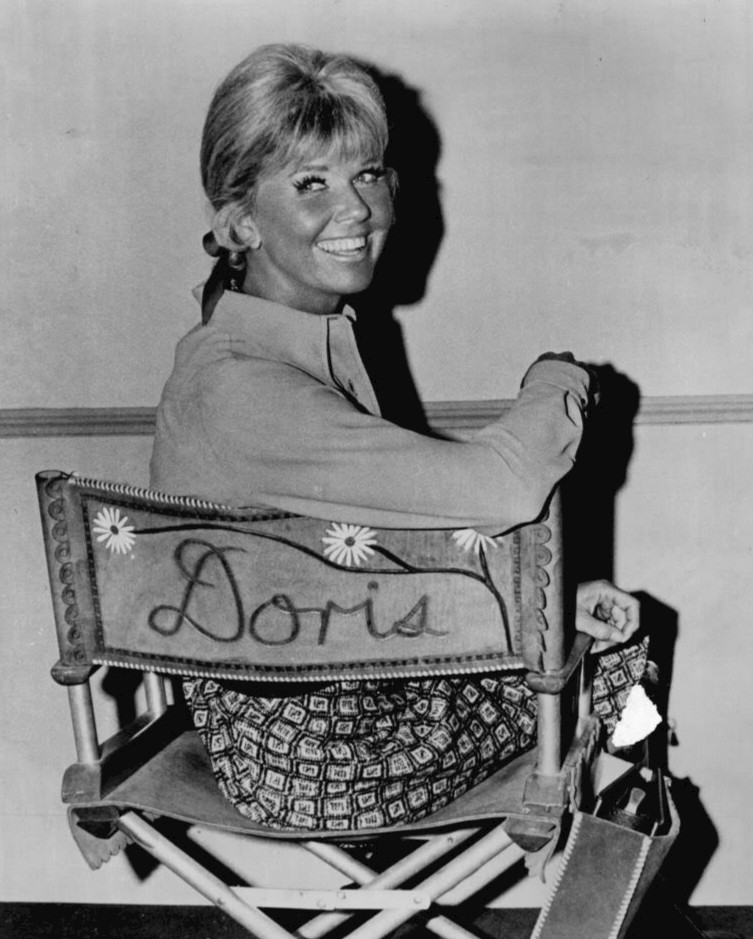
On the set of The Doris Day Show

After her third husband Martin Melcher died on April 20, 1968, Day was shocked to discover that Melcher and his business partner and advisor Jerome Bernard Rosenthal had squandered her earnings, leaving her deeply in debt. Rosenthal had been her attorney since 1949 when he represented her in her uncontested divorce action against her second husband, George W. Weidler. Day filed suit against Rosenthal in 1969 and won in 1974, but did not receive compensation until a settlement was reached in 1979.

Day also learned to her displeasure that Melcher had committed her to a television series that became The Doris Day Show.

It was awful. I was really, really not very well when Marty [Melcher] passed away, and the thought of going into TV was overpowering. But he'd signed me up for a series. And then my son Terry [Melcher] took me walking in Beverly Hills and explained that it wasn't nearly the end of it. I had also been signed up for a bunch of TV specials, all without anyone ever asking me.

— Doris Day, OK! magazine, 1996

Day hated the idea of performing on television but felt obliged to forge ahead with the series. The first episode of The Doris Day Show aired on September 24, 1968, and featured a rerecorded version of "Que Sera, Sera" as its theme song. Day persevered with the show, needing to work to repay her debts, but only after CBS ceded creative control to her and her son. The show enjoyed a successful five-year run, although it may be best remembered for its abrupt season-to-season changes in casting and premise.

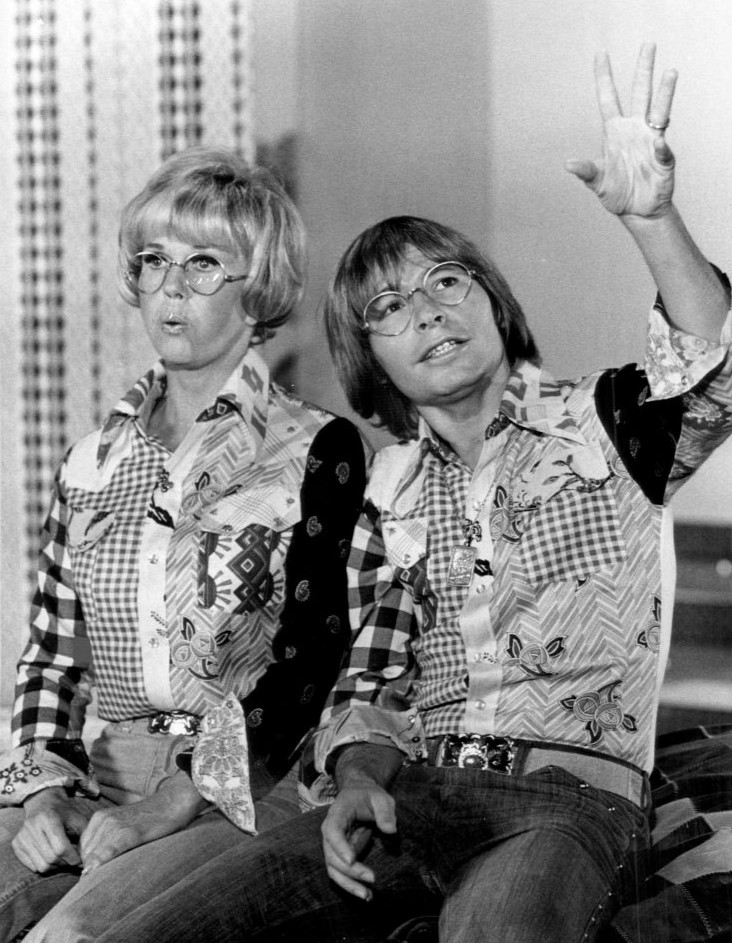
Day with John Denver on the TV special Doris Day Today (CBS, February 19, 1975)

Day also completed two television specials, The Doris Mary Anne Kappelhoff Special (1971) and Doris Day Today (1975), and guested on various shows in the 1970s. In 1985 she recorded new songs, which were released in 2011 as My Heart.

In the 1985–86 season, Day hosted her own television talk show, Doris Day's Best Friends, on the Christian Broadcasting Network (CBN). The channel cancelled the show after 26 episodes despite the worldwide publicity that it had received due to an appearance by Rock Hudson, who was showing the first public symptoms of AIDS, including severe weight loss and fatigue. He died from the disease later that year. Day later said, "He was very sick. But I just brushed that off and I came out and put my arms around him and said, 'Am I glad to see you'."

=== 1980s and 1990s ===
In October 1985, the Supreme Court of California rejected Rosenthal's appeal of the multimillion-dollar judgment awarded to Day in her suit against him for legal malpractice and upheld the conclusions of a trial court and an appeals court that Rosenthal had acted improperly. In April 1986, the U.S. Supreme Court refused to review the lower court's judgment. In June 1987, Rosenthal filed a $30 million lawsuit against lawyers who he claimed cheated him out of millions of dollars in real-estate investments. He named Day as a codefendant, describing her as an "unwilling, involuntary plaintiff whose consent cannot be obtained." Rosenthal claimed that much of the money that Day lost was the result of unwise advice of other attorneys who suggested she sell three hotels at a loss, as well as oil leases in Kentucky and Ohio. He claimed to have made the investments under a long-term plan and did not intend to sell until they appreciated in value. Two of the hotels sold in 1970 for $7 million, and their estimated worth by 1986 was $50 million.

Terry Melcher stated that his father's premature death saved Day from financial ruin. It was not known whether Martin Melcher was duped by Rosenthal, and Day stated publicly that she believed him innocent of any deliberate wrongdoing, in that he "simply trusted the wrong person." According to author David Kaufman, Day's former costar Louis Jourdan maintained that Day disliked her husband, although Day's public statements suggest otherwise.

Day was scheduled to present, along with Patrick Swayze and Marvin Hamlisch, the award for Best Original Score Oscar at the 61st Academy Awards in March 1989, but suffered a deep leg cut from a sprinkler and was unable to attend.

Day was inducted into the Ohio Women's Hall of Fame in 1981 and received the Cecil B. DeMille Award for career achievement in 1989. In 1994, Day's Greatest Hits album entered the British charts. Her cover of "Perhaps, Perhaps, Perhaps" was included in the soundtrack of Strictly Ballroom.

=== 2000s ===
Day participated in celebrations of her birthday with an annual Doris Day music marathon.

She declined tribute offers from the American Film Institute and the Kennedy Center Honors because they both require that recipients attend in person. In 2004, she was awarded the Presidential Medal of Freedom by President George W. Bush for her achievements in the entertainment industry and for her work on behalf of animals. President Bush stated:

In the years since, she has kept her fans and shown the breadth of her talent in television and the movies. She starred on screen with leading men from Jimmy Stewart to Ronald Reagan, from Rock Hudson to James Garner. It was a good day for America when Doris Marianne von Kappelhoff (sic) of Evanston, Ohio decided to become an entertainer. It was a good day for our fellow creatures when she gave her good heart to the cause of animal welfare. Doris Day is one of the greats, and America will always love its sweetheart.

Columnist Liz Smith and film critic Rex Reed mounted vigorous campaigns to gather support for an Academy Honorary Award for Day. According to The Hollywood Reporter, the academy had offered her the honorary Oscar multiple times, but she declined as she saw the film industry as a part of her past life. Day received a Grammy for Lifetime Achievement in Music in 2008, albeit again in absentia.

Day received Grammy Hall of Fame Awards in 1998, 1999 and 2012 for her recordings of "Sentimental Journey", "Secret Love" and "Que Sera, Sera", respectively. She was inducted into the Hit Parade Hall of Fame in 2007, and in 2010 received the first Legend Award presented by the Society of Singers.

=== 2010s ===
At the age of 89, Day released My Heart in 2011, her first new album since the 1994 release of The Love Album, which was recorded in 1967. The album is a compilation of previously unreleased recordings produced by Day's son Terry Melcher. Tracks include the 1970s Joe Cocker hit "You Are So Beautiful", the Beach Boys' "Disney Girls" and jazz standards such as "My Buddy", which Day originally sang in the film I'll See You in My Dreams (1951).

In the U.S., the album reached No. 12 on Amazon's bestseller list and helped raise funds for the Doris Day Animal League. Day became the oldest artist to score a UK Top 10 with an album featuring new material.

In January 2012, the Los Angeles Film Critics Association presented Day with a Lifetime Achievement Award.

In April 2014, Day made an unexpected public appearance to attend the annual Doris Day Animal Foundation benefit.

Clint Eastwood offered Day a role in a film that he was planning to direct in 2015, but she eventually declined.

Day granted ABC a telephone interview on her birthday in 2016 that was accompanied by photos of her life and career.

== Personal life ==
Day was married four times. From April 1941 to February 1943, she was married to trombonist Albert Paul "Al" Jorden (1917–1967), whom she met in Barney Rapp's band. Jorden was violent, had schizophrenia, and died by suicide years after their divorce. When Day became pregnant and refused to have an abortion, he beat her in an attempt to force a miscarriage. Their son was born Terrence Paul Jorden in 1942, and he adopted the surname of Melcher when he was adopted by Day's third husband.

Her second marriage was to George William Weidler (1926–1989), a saxophonist and brother of actress Virginia Weidler, from March 30, 1946, to May 31, 1949. Weidler and Day met again several years later during a brief reconciliation and he introduced her to Christian Science.

Day then married American film producer Martin Melcher (1915–1968), who produced many of her films, on April 3, 1951, her 29th birthday; gossip columnists had written of their mutual interest as early as autumn 1949. Their marriage lasted until he died in April 1968. Melcher adopted Day's son Terry.

Day's only child (from her first marriage) was music producer and songwriter Terry Melcher, who had a hit in the 1960s with "Hey Little Cobra" under the name the Rip Chords before becoming a successful producer whose acts included the Byrds, Paul Revere & the Raiders and the Beach Boys.

Following Melcher's death, Day separated from the Church of Christ, Scientist and grew close to charismatic Protestants such as Kathryn Kuhlman, although she never lost interest in Christian Science teaching and practice.

Day's fourth marriage was to Barry Comden (1935–2009) from April 14, 1976, until April 2, 1982. He was the maître d'hôtel at one of Day's favorite restaurants. He knew of her great love of dogs and endeared himself to her by giving her a bag of meat scraps and bones as she left the restaurant. He later complained that Day cared more for her "animal friends" than for him. From the 1980s, Day owned a hotel in Carmel-by-the-Sea called the Cypress Inn, an early pet–friendly hotel that was featured in Architectural Digest in 1999.

=== Activism and charity work ===
During the filming of The Man Who Knew Too Much, Day observed the mistreatment of animals in a marketplace scene and was inspired to act against animal abuse. She was so appalled at the conditions with which the animals used in filming were kept that she refused to work unless they received sufficient food and proper care. The production company erected feeding stations for the animals and fed them every day before Day would agree to return to work.

In 1971, she cofounded Actors and Others for Animals and appeared in a series of newspaper advertisements denouncing the wearing of fur along with Mary Tyler Moore, Angie Dickinson and Jayne Meadows.

In 1978, Day founded the Doris Day Pet Foundation, now the Doris Day Animal Foundation (DDAF). An independent nonprofit 501(c)(3) grant-giving public charity, DDAF funds other nonprofit causes that promote animal welfare.

To complement the Doris Day Animal Foundation, Day formed the Doris Day Animal League (DDAL) in 1987, a national nonprofit citizens' lobbying organization on behalf of animals. Day actively lobbied the United States Congress in support of legislation designed to safeguard animal welfare on a number of occasions, and in 1995 she originated the annual World Spay Day. The DDAL merged into the Humane Society of the United States (HSUS) in 2006.

The Doris Day Horse Rescue and Adoption Center, which helps abused and neglected horses, opened in 2011 in Murchison, Texas on the grounds of an animal sanctuary started by Day's late friend, author Cleveland Amory. Day contributed $250,000 toward the founding of the center.

A posthumous auction of 1,100 of Day's possessions in April 2020 generated $3 million for the Doris Day Animal Foundation.

Day actively engaged in HIV/AIDS awareness for many years. Her commitment was primarily focused on raising awareness and fundraising for HIV/AIDS research. She co-organized several fundraising events for HIV/AIDS-related charities and provided financial contributions to research and support programs for individuals affected by the disease. In 2011, the Canadian magazine Gay Globe paid tribute to Day by featuring her on the cover of their #79 edition.

=== Later life ===
After her retirement from films, Day lived in Carmel-by-the-Sea, California. She had many pets and adopted stray animals. She was a lifelong Republican.

In a rare interview with The Hollywood Reporter on April 4, 2019, the day after her 97th birthday, Day talked about her work on the Doris Day Animal Foundation, founded in 1978. Asked to name the favorite of her films, she answered with Calamity Jane: "I was such a tomboy growing up, and she was such a fun character to play. Of course, the music was wonderful, too—'Secret Love,' especially, is such a beautiful song."

To commemorate her birthday, Day's fans gathered in late March each year for a three-day party in Carmel-by-the-Sea, California. The event was also a fundraiser for her animal foundation. During the 2019 event, there was a special screening of her film Pillow Talk (1959) to celebrate its 60th anniversary. Speaking about the film, Day stated that she "had such fun working with my pal, Rock. We laughed our way through three films we made together and remained great friends. I miss him."

=== Death ===
Day died of pneumonia at her home in Carmel Valley, California, on May 13, 2019, at the age of 97. Her death was announced by the Doris Day Animal Foundation. As requested by Day, the foundation announced that there would be no funeral services, grave marker or other public memorials.

== Filmography ==
=== Notable films ===
- Romance on the High Seas (1948)
- Calamity Jane (1953)
- Love Me or Leave Me (1955)
- The Man Who Knew Too Much (1956)
- Pillow Talk (1959)
- Midnight Lace (1960)
- Please Don't Eat the Daisies (1960)
- The Thrill of It All (1963)
- Move Over, Darling (1963)
- Send Me No Flowers (1964)
- The Glass Bottom Boat (1966)
- With Six You Get Eggroll (1968)

== Discography ==
=== Studio albums ===
- You're My Thrill (1949)
- Young Man with a Horn (1950)
- Tea for Two (1950)
- Lullaby of Broadway (1951)
- On Moonlight Bay (1951)
- I'll See You in My Dreams (1951)
- By the Light of the Silvery Moon (1953)
- Calamity Jane (1953)
- Young at Heart (1954)
- Love Me or Leave Me (1955)
- Day Dreams (1955)
- Day by Day (1956)
- The Pajama Game (1957)
- Day by Night (1957)
- Hooray for Hollywood (1958)
- Cuttin' Capers (1959)
- What Every Girl Should Know (1960)
- Show Time (1960)
- Listen to Day (1960)
- Bright and Shiny (1961)
- I Have Dreamed (1961)
- Duet (1962)
- You'll Never Walk Alone (1962)
- Billy Rose's Jumbo (1962)
- Annie Get Your Gun (1963)
- Love Him (1963)
- The Doris Day Christmas Album (1964)
- With a Smile and a Song (1964)
- Latin for Lovers (1965)
- Doris Day's Sentimental Journey (1965)
- The Love Album (recorded 1967; released in 1994)
- My Heart (with eight previously unissued tracks recorded in 1985; released in 2011)

== See also ==
- List of awards and nominations received by Doris Day

== Sources ==
- Barothy, Mary Anne (2007), Day at a Time: An Indiana Girl's Sentimental Journey to Doris Day's Hollywood and Beyond. Hawthorne Publishing, ISBN 9780978716738
- Braun, Eric (2004), Doris Day (2 ed.), London: Orion Books, ISBN 978-0-7528-1715-6
- Bret, David (2008), Doris Day: Reluctant Star. JR Books, London, ISBN 9781781313510
- Brogan, Paul E. (2011), Was That a Name I Dropped?, Aberdeen Bay; ISBN 1608300501, 978-1608300501
- DeVita, Michael J. (2012). My 'Secret Love' Affair with Doris Day (Paperback). CreateSpace Independent Publishing Platform. ISBN 978-1478153580.
- Hotchner, AE (1975), Doris Day: Her Own Story, William Morrow & Co, ISBN 978-0-688-02968-5.
- Kaufman, David (2008), Doris Day: The Untold Story of the Girl Next Door, New York: Virgin Books, ISBN 978-1-905264-30-8
- McGee, Garry (2005), Doris Day: Sentimental Journey, McFarland & Co, ISBN 9781476603216
- Patrick, Pierre; McGee, Garry (2006), Que Sera, Sera: The Magic of Doris Day Through Television, Bear Manor, ISBN 9781593930561
- Patrick, Pierre; McGee, Garry (2009), The Doris Day Companion: A Beautiful Day. BearManor Media, ISBN 9781593933494
- Santopietro, Thomas "Tom" (2007), Considering Doris Day, New York: Thomas Dunn Books, ISBN 978-0-312-36263-8
