= List of Billboard number-one albums of 1952 =

These are the number-one ranked albums by week in the United States in 1952 according to the Billboard Best Selling Pop Albums chart for both 33 1/3 and 45 RPM records.

== Chart history ==
Chart history
Issue date	33 1/3 R.P.M.			45 R.P.M.			Ref.
Issue date	Album	Artist(s)	Label	Album	Artist(s)	Label	Ref.
January 5	Mario Lanza Sings Christmas Songs	Mario Lanza	RCA Victor	Mario Lanza Sings Christmas Songs	Mario Lanza	RCA Victor	
January 12	An American in Paris	Soundtrack	MGM	An American in Paris	Soundtrack	MGM	
January 19	An American in Paris	Soundtrack	MGM	An American in Paris	Soundtrack	MGM	
January 26	An American in Paris	Soundtrack	MGM	An American in Paris	Soundtrack	MGM	
February 2	An American in Paris	Soundtrack	MGM	An American in Paris	Soundtrack	MGM	
February 9	An American in Paris	Soundtrack	MGM	An American in Paris	Soundtrack	MGM	
February 16	An American in Paris	Soundtrack	MGM	An American in Paris	Soundtrack	MGM	
February 23	An American in Paris	Soundtrack	MGM	An American in Paris	Soundtrack	MGM	
March 1	An American in Paris	Soundtrack	MGM	An American in Paris	Soundtrack	MGM	
March 8	An American in Paris	Soundtrack	MGM	An American in Paris	Soundtrack	MGM	
March 15	An American in Paris	Soundtrack	MGM	I'll See You in My Dreams	Doris Day	Columbia	
March 22	I'll See You in My Dreams	Doris Day	Columbia	I'll See You in My Dreams	Doris Day	Columbia	
March 29	An American in Paris	Soundtrack	MGM	I'll See You in My Dreams	Doris Day	Columbia	
April 5	An American in Paris	Soundtrack	MGM	I'll See You in My Dreams	Doris Day	Columbia	
April 12	An American in Paris	Soundtrack	MGM	An American in Paris	Soundtrack	MGM	
April 19	An American in Paris	Soundtrack	MGM	An American in Paris	Soundtrack	MGM	
April 26	An American in Paris	Soundtrack	MGM	An American in Paris	Soundtrack	MGM	
May 3	An American in Paris	Soundtrack	MGM	With a Song in My Heart	Jane Froman	Capitol	
May 10	With a Song in My Heart	Jane Froman	Capitol	With a Song in My Heart	Jane Froman	Capitol	
May 17	With a Song in My Heart	Jane Froman	Capitol	With a Song in My Heart	Jane Froman	Capitol	
May 24	With a Song in My Heart	Jane Froman	Capitol	With a Song in My Heart	Jane Froman	Capitol	
May 31	With a Song in My Heart	Jane Froman	Capitol	With a Song in My Heart	Jane Froman	Capitol	
June 7	With a Song in My Heart	Jane Froman	Capitol	With a Song in My Heart	Jane Froman	Capitol	
June 14	With a Song in My Heart	Jane Froman	Capitol	With a Song in My Heart	Jane Froman	Capitol	
June 21	With a Song in My Heart	Jane Froman	Capitol	With a Song in My Heart	Jane Froman	Capitol	
June 28	With a Song in My Heart	Jane Froman	Capitol	With a Song in My Heart	Jane Froman	Capitol	
July 5	With a Song in My Heart	Jane Froman	Capitol	With a Song in My Heart	Jane Froman	Capitol	
July 12	With a Song in My Heart	Jane Froman	Capitol	With a Song in My Heart	Jane Froman	Capitol	
July 19	With a Song in My Heart	Jane Froman	Capitol	With a Song in My Heart	Jane Froman	Capitol	
July 26	With a Song in My Heart	Jane Froman	Capitol	With a Song in My Heart	Jane Froman	Capitol	
August 2	With a Song in My Heart	Jane Froman	Capitol	With a Song in My Heart	Jane Froman	Capitol	
August 9	With a Song in My Heart	Jane Froman	Capitol	With a Song in My Heart	Jane Froman	Capitol	
August 16	With a Song in My Heart	Jane Froman	Capitol	With a Song in My Heart	Jane Froman	Capitol	
August 23	With a Song in My Heart	Jane Froman	Capitol	With a Song in My Heart	Jane Froman	Capitol	
August 30	With a Song in My Heart	Jane Froman	Capitol	With a Song in My Heart	Jane Froman	Capitol	
September 6	With a Song in My Heart	Jane Froman	Capitol	With a Song in My Heart	Jane Froman	Capitol	
September 13	With a Song in My Heart	Jane Froman	Capitol	With a Song in My Heart	Jane Froman	Capitol	
September 20	With a Song in My Heart	Jane Froman	Capitol	With a Song in My Heart	Jane Froman	Capitol	
September 27	With a Song in My Heart	Jane Froman	Capitol	With a Song in My Heart	Jane Froman	Capitol	
October 4	With a Song in My Heart	Jane Froman	Capitol	With a Song in My Heart	Jane Froman	Capitol	
October 11	With a Song in My Heart	Jane Froman	Capitol	With a Song in My Heart	Jane Froman	Capitol	
October 18	The Merry Widow	Soundtrack	MGM	With a Song in My Heart	Jane Froman	Capitol	
October 25	The Merry Widow	Soundtrack	MGM	Liberace at the Piano	Liberace	Columbia	
November 1	The Merry Widow	Soundtrack	MGM	Liberace at the Piano & I'm in the Mood for Love tied	Liberace & Eddie Fisher tied	Columbia & RCA Victor tied	
November 8	The Merry Widow	Soundtrack	MGM	I'm in the Mood for Love	Eddie Fisher	RCA Victor	
November 15	Because You're Mine	Mario Lanza / Soundtrack	RCA Victor	I'm in the Mood for Love	Eddie Fisher	RCA Victor	
November 22	Because You're Mine	Mario Lanza / Soundtrack	RCA Victor	I'm in the Mood for Love	Eddie Fisher	RCA Victor	
November 29	Liberace at the Piano	Liberace	Columbia	I'm in the Mood for Love	Eddie Fisher	RCA Victor	
December 6	Because You're Mine	Mario Lanza / Soundtrack	RCA Victor	I'm in the Mood for Love	Eddie Fisher	RCA Victor	
December 13	Because You're Mine	Mario Lanza / Soundtrack	RCA Victor	I'm in the Mood for Love	Eddie Fisher	RCA Victor	
December 20	1937–'38 Jazz Concert No. 2	Benny Goodman	Columbia	I'm in the Mood for Love	Eddie Fisher	RCA Victor	
December 27	1937–'38 Jazz Concert No. 2	Benny Goodman	Columbia	I'm in the Mood for Love	Eddie Fisher	RCA Victor	

== See also ==
- 1952 in music
- List of Billboard number-one singles of 1952

== Notes ==
^{A} November 1, 1952: Liberace at the Piano and I'm in the Mood for Love tied for number one for Best Selling 45 RPM album.
