= With a Song in My Heart =

With a Song in My Heart may refer to:

- With a Song in My Heart (film), a 1952 movie biography of Jane Froman, starring Susan Hayward
- "With a Song in My Heart" (song), a 1929 popular song by Richard Rodgers and Lorenz Hart, revived in 1948
- With a Song in My Heart (Jane Froman album), 1952
- With a Song in My Heart (Stevie Wonder album), 1963
- With a Song in My Heart (John Pizzarelli album), 2008
