= 1937/38 Jazz Concert No. 2 =

Studio album by Benny Goodman and his orchestra, trio, and quartet
- Released: 1952
- Label: Columbia

Benny Goodman and his orchestra, trio, and quartet chronology
The Famous 1938 Carnegie Hall Jazz Concert (1950)	1937/38 Jazz Concert No. 2 (1952)	BG in Hi-Fi (1954)

Professional ratings
Review scores
Source	Rating
AllMusic	5/5 stars
The Encyclopedia of Popular Music	3/5 stars

1937/38 Jazz Concert No. 2 is a double LP album by Benny Goodman and his orchestra, trio, and quartet released by Columbia Records in 1952.

== Release ==
The album was released as a set of two 12-inch (300 mm) LPs (cat. no. SL-180) and as two separate volumes: Volume II (ML-4590) and Volume II (ML-4591). All the three versions were also available as sets of 45-rpm records.

The album was later reissued on Legacy in the CD format under the title Benny Goodman on the Air 1937–38, with some tracks added.

== Reception ==
The album spent several consecutive weeks at number one on the 33 1/3 rpm half of Billboard's Best-Selling Popular Record Albums chart in late 1952 — early 1953.

== Track listing ==
2 × LP (Columbia Masterworks SL-180)

Side 1
No.	Title	Writer(s)	Note(s)	Length
1.	"Let's Dance"	Baldridge; Stone; Bonine
2.	"Ridin' High"	Cole Porter
3.	"Nice Work If You Can Get It" (from Damsel in Distress)	I. Gershwin; G. Gershwin
4.	"Vibraphone Blues"	L. Hampton	Vocal by Lionel Hampton
5.	"The Sheik of Araby"	H. Smith; Wheeler; Snyder
6.	"Peckin'"	Pollack; H. James; Ellington
7.	"Sunny Disposish"	I. Gershwin; Charig
8.	"Nagasaki"	Dixon; Warren
9.	"St. Louis Blues"	W. C. Handy

Side 2
No.	Title	Writer(s)	Note(s)	Length
1.	"Sugar Foot Stomp"	Oliver; Armstrong
2.	"Moonglow"	Hudson; De Lange; I. Mills
3.	"I'm a Ding Dong Daddy (from Dumas)"	Baxter
4.	"I Hadn't Anyone till You"	R. Noble	Vocal: Martha Tilton
5.	"Always"	Berlin
6.	"Down South Camp Meetin'"	Henderson; I. Mills
7.	"Sweet Leilani"	H. Owens
8.	"Sometimes I'm Happy"	Caesar; Youmans
9.	"Roll 'Em"	M. Williams

Side 3
No.	Title	Writer(s)	Note(s)	Length
1.	"King Porter Stomp"	J. R. Morton
2.	"Have You Met Miss Jones" (from I'd Rather Be Right)	Hart; Rodgers
3.	"Shine"	F. Dabney; Mack; L. Brown
4.	"Minnie the Moocher's Wedding Day"	Koehler; Arlen
5.	"Runnin' Wild"	J. Grey; L. Wood; Gibbs
6.	"You Turned the Tables on Me"	S. Mitchell; Alter	Vocal: Helen Ward
7.	"At the Darktown Strutters' Ball"	S. Brooks
8.	"My Gal Sal"	Dresser
9.	"Bugle Call Rag"	Pettis; Meyers; Schoebel

Side 4
No.	Title	Writer(s)	Length
1.	"Clarinet Marmalade"	Shields; Ragas
2.	"Time on My Hands (You in My Arms)" (from Smiles)
3.	"Stardust"	Carmichael; Parish
4.	"Benny Sent Me"	B. Goodman
5.	"Everybody Loves My Baby"	Palmer; S. Williams
6.	"Josephine"	Kahn; W. King; Bivens
7.	"Killer Diller"	B. Goodman; Mundy
8.	"Someday Sweetheart"	J. Spikes; B. Spikes
9.	"Caravan"	Ellington; Tizol
10.	"Goodbye"	G. Jenkins

== Charts ==
Chart (1952–53)	Peak position
US Billboard Best-Selling Popular Record Albums – 33 1/3 RPM	1

== See also ==
- List of Billboard number-one albums of 1952
- List of Billboard 200 number-one albums of 1953
