= I'll See You in My Dreams (Doris Day album) =

Soundtrack album by Doris Day
- Released: December 14, 1951
- Label: Columbia

Doris Day chronology
On Moonlight Bay (1951)	I'll See You in My Dreams (1951)	By the Light of the Silvery Moon (1953)

I'll See You in My Dreams was a 10" LP album issued by Columbia Records as catalog # CL-6198 on December 14, 1951, featuring Doris Day and Paul Weston's orchestra, containing songs from the soundtrack of the movie of the same name. The album peaked at number 1 on the Billboard Best Selling Pop Albums chart in March 1952.

The album was combined with Day's 1953 album, Calamity Jane, on a compact disc, issued on June 12, 2001, by Collectables Records.

== Track listing ==
1. "Ain't We Got Fun?" (Richard A. Whiting/Raymond B. Egan/Gus Kahn) (duet with Danny Thomas)
2. "The One I Love (Belongs to Somebody Else)" (Isham Jones/Gus Kahn)
3. "I Wish I Had a Girl" (with the Norman Luboff Choir)
4. "It Had to Be You" (Isham Jones/Gus Kahn)
5. "Nobody's Sweetheart" (Elmer Schoebel/Ernie Erdman/Gus Kahn/Billy Meyers) (with the Norman Luboff Choir)
6. "My Buddy" (Walter Donaldson/Gus Kahn)
7. "Makin' Whoopee!" (Walter Donaldson/Gus Kahn) (duet with Danny Thomas)
8. "I'll See You in My Dreams" (Isham Jones/Gus Kahn) (with the Norman Luboff Choir)

== Reception ==
AllMusic noted that I'll See You in My Dreams was her third musical film of 1951 and "Warner Bros., which had her under contract, didn't yet have a record company, so there were no official soundtrack albums from these films, but Columbia Records, which also had her under contract, was happy to take up the slack by having her make studio recordings of the songs from the films, sometimes with members of the cast ... with 'I'll See You in My Dreams' ... Danny Thomas was along for a couple of guest appearances -- he duetted with her on 'Ain't We Got Fun' and 'Makin' Whoopee!' -- but this was mostly Day's show. The songs were Tin Pan Alley and show tunes for which Gus Kahn had contributed lyrics, and as she had on her previous movie tie-ins she did right by the music here, backed by Paul Weston's orchestra and the vocal chorus of Norman Luboff and the Lee Brothers".

American author Tom Santopietro gave the album an 'A' grade, saying it was "great songs by a great singer". British music writer Colin Larkin awarded it a "good" rating in his Encyclopedia of Popular Music.

== See also ==
- List of Billboard number-one albums of 1952
