= Stanton Catlin =

American art historian (1915–1997)

Stanton Loomis Catlin (February 19, 1915 – November 26, 1997) was an American art historian, specializing in Latin America. After studying at Oberlin College and the Academy of Fine Arts, Prague, he was to have studied European modern art. The Second World War interrupted these plans and he instead focused on Latin American art. During the war Catlin assisted with exhibiting American art in Latin America, served as a Latin American specialist with the Office of the Coordinator of Inter-American Affairs and as a lecturer at the University of Chile. At the war's end he served with the United Nations Relief and Rehabilitation Administration in Germany, assisting displaced persons.

After the war Catlin became executive director of the American Institute of Graphic Arts, then curator at the Minneapolis Institute of Art. Whilst director of the Yale University Art Gallery he won a Grammy award for best album notes in 1965 for an essay on Mexican art and also curated the first US exhibition entirely of Latin American art. Catlin was afterwards appointed by the Center for Inter-American Relations (now the Americas Society) as director of their art gallery before joining the staff of Syracuse University in 1974. He became professor emeritus in 1986. From 1994 to 1997 he compiled a list of 150 Mexican mural paintings in the United States for the National Autonomous University of Mexico.

== Early career ==
Stanton Loomis Catlin was born in Portland, Oregon, on February 19, 1915. He was known to friends and family as Tod. He attended Oberlin College in Ohio, graduating with a bachelor's degree in 1937. Catlin then spent two years at the Academy of Fine Arts, Prague, in Czechoslovakia. He was awarded a Fogg Museum scholarship by Harvard University to study modern art collections in Europe, becoming the first Fogg museum fellow in modern art, but it was cancelled because of the outbreak of the Second World War in Europe.

== Second World War ==
With his European plans scuppered Catlin chose to study modern Mexican art. He visited Mexico for the first time in 1939 on a graduate fellowship to study contemporary mural painting and met Diego Rivera, Frida Kahlo and José Clemente Orozco, whose work he would later write about. Catlin contributed to the Twenty Centuries of Mexican Art exhibition at the Museum of Modern Art, New York, in 1940. In 1941 he joined that museum's project to send examples of contemporary American art on tours of ten cities in Central and South America.

After America's entry into the Second World War Catlin served as a representative at the Office of the Coordinator of Inter-American Affairs, specialising in cultural relations with Latin America. From 1942 he taught the history of United States art at the University of Chile. After the war he served in the displaced persons field operations division of the United Nations Relief and Rehabilitation Administration, being posted to Munich and Heidelberg in Germany.

== Later academic career ==
In 1947 Catlin became executive director of the American Institute of Graphic Arts, holding the position for three years. The New York University awarded him a graduate degree in art history in 1952. Catlin was curator of American art at the Minneapolis Institute of Art from 1956 to 1958 and director of the Yale University Art Gallery from 1958 to 1967. During the latter period he wrote an essay on mural painting that accompanied Mexico: Its Cultural Life in Music and Art, a Columbia Records Legacy Collection album of Mexican music by Carlos Chávez. A review in School Library Journal called Mexico a "sturdy cloth-bound book with recording inserted in its back cover". Catlin shared, with historian Carleton Beals, the 1965 Grammy prize for best album notes for his contribution to the work. Also while at Yale Art Gallery Catlin curated the influential 1966 Art of Latin America Since Independence, sponsored by Yale and the University of Texas and the first US exhibition to include only Latin American art. In 1967 he received a masters degree from the New York University Institute of Fine Arts.

Catlin became the first director of the Center for Inter-American Relations (now the Americas Society) art gallery. In 1974 he was appointed a professor of museum studies and art history by Syracuse University and was also appointed director of the university's art galleries. He was appointed professor emeritus in 1982. In 1983 he provided advice on the founding of the Musée du Panthéon National Haïtien and on its inaugural Maîtres de l’Art Haitien (Masters of Haitian Art) exhibition. Catlin served as consultant for a 1986 retrospective on Rivera at the Detroit Institute of Arts.

From 1994 Catlin worked with the National Autonomous University of Mexico on a long-term project on the history of Mexican mural painting. He completed his portion of the work, recording the locations of 150 Mexican murals in the US, shortly before his death.

== Death and legacy ==
Catlin died on November 26, 1997, at home in Fayetteville, New York. He was aged 82 and was survived by his wife Ruth Phelps Catlin, a son and daughter. At the time of his death he was considered the pre-eminent US expert on Latin American art history. Catlin's papers are stored by the Smithsonian Institution in their Archives of American Art. These cover the period from 1911 to his death, though are mainly post-1930, and take up 56.4 linear feet of shelf space.
