= Yours Alone =

Studio album by Jane Froman
- Released: 1953
- Label: Capitol

Jane Froman chronology
With a Song in My Heart (1952)	Yours Alone (1953)	Gems from Gershwin (1954)

Yours Alone is a studio album by Jane Froman, released in 1953 on Capitol Records.

== Background ==
Professional ratings
Review scores
Source	Rating
Billboard	80/100

With a Song in My Heart / Yours Alone (2000 CD)
Review scores
Source	Rating
AllMusic	3/5 stars

It is an album of love songs.

Colin Bratkovich in his 2014 book Just Remember This describes the album as following: "This LP [...] found Jane recording 1930s' ditties that she may have done only on radio. [...] The ears of this author [...] find Jane has improved vocally."

Yours Alone was a follow-up to her highly successful album With a Song in My Heart, that had spent numerous weeks at number one on Billboard's Best-Selling Pop Albums chart in 1952.

"This new waxing should also move nicely across the counters," wrote the Billboard magazine in its review from 7 February 1953. The magazine called the album "a tasteful disking" and gave it 80 points out of 100, which indicated an "excellent" rating. The reviewer elaborated: "On this set Miss Froman does a lovely job with a group of wonderful evergreens, projecting them with warmth and feeling. She is in fine form, soft and tender with 'Hands Across the Table', pert and lively on 'How About You' and very effective on all the other top-flight ballads."

== Track listing ==
10-inch LP (Capitol H 354)

Part 1
No.	Title	Writer(s)	Length
1.	"Hands Across the Table"	Jean DeLettre—Mitchell Parish
2.	"How About You?"	Burton Lane—Ralph Freed
3.	"What Is There to Say"	Vernon Duke—E. Y. Harburg
4.	"Soon"	George Gershwin—Ira Gershwin

Part 2
No.	Title	Writer(s)	Length
1.	"Be Still My Heart"	Allan Flynn—Jack Egan
2.	"More than You Know"	Youmans—Rose—Eliscu
3.	"There's a Lull in My Life"	Mack Gordon—Harry Revel
4.	"A Little Kiss Each Morning (A Little Kiss Each Night)"	Harry Woods
