= The Cloisters (Palm Springs) =

House in Palm Springs, California

The Cloisters is a house in Palm Springs, California. It was the residence of the American entertainer Liberace from 1967 until his death at the property in 1987.

It is located at 501 North Belardo Road in the Old Las Palmas area of Palm Springs. The house was depicted in the 2013 film Behind the Candelabra that chronicled Liberace's relationship with Scott Thorson.

== History ==
The house was built in 1930 for Alvah Hicks, the owner of the Palm Springs Water Company. It was subsequently owned by the socialite Ludvovica Graham. It was sold twice more before its purchase in 1967 for $185,000 (equivalent to $1,786,302 in 2025) by the pianist and entertainer Liberace. The house was an 11-bedroom hotel at the time of Liberace's purchase. He died in the house on 4 February 1987 of an AIDS-related complication. The architectural style of the house has been described as Spanish Mission architecture.

Liberace’s mother, Frances Liberace, lived in an adjoining villa on the estate, commonly referred to as the ‘Petite Cloister,’ which formed part of the larger residential compound.

In November 1988 the house was put up for sale for $850,000 (equivalent to $2,313,942 in 2025). The sale occurred after the Palm Springs City Council rejected an offer by Liberace's family to have the house open as a historical house museum. The house sold in March 1990 for $750,000. In April 1990 an auction was held at The Plaza Theater in Palm Springs by Butterfield & Butterfield of 3,000 items in 430 lots from The Cloisters. Over a thousand people had viewed the items in situ at the house in the days prior to the sale. Proceeds from the auction were donated to the Liberace Foundation for the Performing and Creative Arts.

== Design and interior decoration ==
The house was listed at 7,000 square feet (650 m^{2}) in size at the time of its sale in 1990. Liberace spent prodigiously on the interior of the house, installing chandeliers and mirrors. He built a chapel with stained-glass windows at the Cloisters that was dedicated to Anthony of Padua. His mother and sister attended mass at the Our Lady of Solitude church opposite the house. The Rudolph Valentino room featured Valentino's bed, from his house Falcon Lair, which Liberace had acquired at auction. Other rooms included the Gloria Vanderbilt Suite, Zebra room and the Persian Tent Room.
