= Stars over Broadway =

1935 film by William Keighley

- Directed by: William Keighley
- Screenplay by: Jerry Wald; Julius J. Epstein; Pat C. Flick
- Based on: Thin Air; 1934 story in Hearst's International Cosmopolitan by Mildred Cram
- Produced by: Samuel Bischoff
- Starring: Pat O'Brien; Jane Froman; James Melton; Jean Muir; Frank McHugh; Eddie Conrad
- Cinematography: George Barnes
- Edited by: Bert L'Orle
- Music by: Heinz Roemheld
- Production company: Warner Bros. Pictures
- Distributed by: Warner Bros. Pictures
- Release date: November 23, 1935
- Running time: 89 minutes
- Country: United States
- Language: English

Stars over Broadway is a 1935 American musical film directed by William Keighley, written by Jerry Wald, Julius J. Epstein, & Pat C. Flick, and starring Pat O'Brien, Jane Froman, James Melton, Jean Muir, Frank McHugh, and Eddie Conrad. It was released by Warner Bros. Pictures on November 23, 1935.

== Plot ==
Al McGillevray, a failed theatrical manager, is about to commit suicide when he hears Jan King, the hotel porter, singing and offers to make him an opera star. After Jan agrees, Al takes a series of odd jobs to pay for his singing lessons, and his teacher, Minotti, arranges an audition at the Metropolitan Opera. Jan is well received, but when Al learns that he will need another five years of study before he will be ready to go on stage, he takes Jan to the radio stations, intending to make him a crooner instead.

At an amateur-hour competition they meet Nora Wyman, another singer. She begs Al to manage her as well, but he tries to discourage her, saying she is too nice for a career in show business.

Jan auditions at a noisy club where he becomes an immediate success and meets another successful singer, Joan Garrett, who helps him get more work.

Al wants Jan to study opera again now that they have enough money, but Jan is having too much fun as a crooner. As he becomes more popular, Jan starts to drink and is late for his shows, then misses one completely and is fired. Al finally succumbs to Nora's wishes and allows Minotti to hear her sing.

Although Minotti thinks Nora has a good voice, Al persuades him to tell her otherwise. Nora is devastated by the news and walks in front of a car. In the hospital, Al tells Nora what he has done, confessing that he lied because he loves her. After he leaves her, he spends the last of his money to send Minotti and Jan to Italy to save Jan's voice. Sometime later, Al visits Jan backstage at his opera debut and Nora is there, too. Jan has learned about Al's generosity and wants him to manage him again. Nora tells Al that she has decided her singing is not important, and all she wants is to be his wife.

== Cast ==
- Pat O'Brien as Al McGillevray
- Jane Froman as Joan Garrett
- James Melton as Jan King
- Jean Muir as Nora Wyman
- Frank McHugh as Offkey Cramer
- Eddie Conrad as Freddy
- William Ricciardi as Minotti
- Marie Wilson as Molly
- Frank Fay as Announcer
- E. E. Clive as Crane
- George Chandler as Charlie

== Reception ==
Frank S. Nugent of The New York Times wrote in his review: "The Warners have tackled the operatic film with an engaging sense of humor. In Stars over Broadway, which opened last night at the Strand, they contemplate grand opera with their tongue in their collective cheek, and with Al Dubin and Harry Warren standing by to assist the Messrs. Verdi, Schubert, and von Flotow in moments of upper registral stress and strain. The result is a generally amiable and melodious comedy which merits praise chiefly for its failure of fawn completely upon the diamond horseshoe. If there has been an evil in this operatic film cycle, it has been that of obsequiousness. No Uriah Heep could be more unctuous than the cinema has been in the presence of the Metropolitan. And opera, when placed in the Fellowship of the Sacred Cows, can be made very dull indeed. Just as dull, in fact, as some of the screen plays about those other Sacred Cows—motherhood, the home, the Hippocratic oath and the football team. Stars over Broadway, then, is close to its best in that moment when Pat O'Brien refuses to permit the opera to claim his protégé. James Melton, and drags him from the Met stage to the microphone to convert his vocal assets into coffee-hour gold. It seemed that the maestri who heard the singer were thrilled with his voice, but felt he needed about five more years of study before chancing a début. And Mr. O'Brien, as he tactfully expressed it, 'needed some dough' and 'wasn't going to wait till I decorate a wheel chair'."
