= Liberace at the Piano =

Studio album by Liberace
- Released: 1952
- Label: Columbia

Liberace at the Piano is a studio album by American pianist Liberace, released in 1952 on Columbia Records.

== Release ==
The album was released in several formats: as a set of four 10-inch 78-rpm phonograph records (cat. no. C-308), a set of four 7-inch 45-rpm records (cat. no. B-308) and as a 10-inch LP (cat. no. CL 6217).

== Reception ==
The album reached number one on Billboard's Best-Selling Pop Albums chart – both on the 33⅓-rpm and 45-rpm halves of it.

== 1954 version ==
Professional ratings
Review scores
Source	Rating
Billboard	86/100 (1954 ver.)

In 1954, the album was released on a 12-inch LP (cat. no. CL 575). Billboard described the LP as follows: "Our boy doesn't chatter or sing on this disk—just plays his usual flashy pianistics, backed by brother George's ork. The 12 selections range from 'Moonlight Sonata' and 'The Rosary' to the 'Maiden's Wish Samba' and 'As Time Goes By'. As usual, it's a shrewd hodgepodge of classics and standards, designed to please all his fans, whatever their musical tastes" and gave it 86 points out of 100 (which indicated an "excellent" rating).

== Track listing ==
10-inch LP (Columbia CL 6217)

Side 1
No.	Title	Writer(s)	Length
1.	"Star Dust"	Parish–Carmichael
2.	"Liebestraum" ("Love's Dream")	Liszt
3.	"Carioca" from "Flying Down to Rio"	Kahn–Eliscu–Youmans
4.	"Polish National Dance in E-Flat Minor, Op. 47"	Scharwenka

Side 2
No.	Title	Writer(s)	Length
1.	"Moonlight Sonata" (Sonata No. 14 in C-Sharp Minor, Opus 27, No. 2)	Beethoven
2.	"Warsaw Concerto"	Addinsell
3.	"As Time Goes By"	Hupfeld
4.	"Malagueña" from "Suite Andalucía"	Lecuona

12-inch LP (Columbia CL 575)

Side 1
No.	Title	Writer(s)	Length
1.	"Star Dust"	Parish–Carmichael
2.	"Liebestraum" ("Love's Dream")	Liszt
3.	"Carioca"—from "Flying Down to Rio"	Kahn–Eliscu–Youmans
4.	"Polish National Dance in E-Flat Minor, Op. 47"	Scharwenka
5.	"Easter Parade"	Berlin
6.	"Maiden's Wish Samba"	Chopin—Arr.: Liberace

Side 2
No.	Title	Writer(s)	Length
1.	"Moonlight Sonata" (Sonata No. 14 in C-Sharp Minor, Opus 27, No. 2)	Beethoven
2.	"Warsaw Concerto"	Addinsell
3.	"As Time Goes By"	Hupfeld
4.	"Eighteenth Variation Theme" from "The Story of Three Loves"	Rachmaninoff
5.	"The Rosary"	R. Rogers—Nevin
6.	"Malagueña" from "Suite Andalucía"	Lecuona

== Charts ==
Chart (1952)	Peak position
US Billboard Best Selling Pop Albums – Best Selling 33⅓ R.P.M.	1
US Billboard Best Selling Pop Albums – Best Selling 45 R.P.M.	1

== See also ==
- List of Billboard number-one albums of 1952
