= Legacy Collection =

Series of releases by Columbia Records

The Legacy Collection or Legacy Series was a series of releases by Columbia Records (later, following a reorganization, called CBS Records) that combined LP records with books.

The Legacy Collection began in September 1960 with The American Revolution, which contained an LP and 62-page book about the American Revolutionary War. Items in the series were generally on historical subjects. The series was produced by Goddard Lieberson, who started it as a way to "document important periods and events in the history of our continent". When Columbia was reorganized in 1966, Legacy remained within Lieberson's remit when he took over as head of what was now called CBS Records, a division of CBS-Columbia Group.

The Badmen (1963), a collection for children about outlaws on the American frontier, combines recordings of American folk music and spoken word performance with a 70-page book. In 1965, Stanton Catlin and Carleton Beals shared the Grammy Award for Best Album Notes for Mexico. Mexico's book is in Spanish and English. The record has music by Carlos Chávez; some compositions are based on Spanish songs and others attempt to reconstruct Aztec music. The Irish Uprising (1966), about the Easter Rising, has a book with a foreword by Éamon de Valera and recordings of Irish ballads. John Fitzgerald Kennedy ... As We Remember Him includes a book reproducing photographs from John F. Kennedy's childhood and a recording of his mother Rose Kennedy. The Russian Revolution has a recording of Vladimir Lenin's voice.

== Releases ==
| Title | Year | Catalog number | Reference(s) |
|---|---|---|---|
| The American Revolution | 1960 (reissue) | LL 1001 | |
| The Confederacy | 1961 (reissue) | LL 1003 | |
| The Union | 1961 | LL 1005 | |
| First Performance—Lincoln Center for the Performing Arts | 1962 | XLP 57304 XLP 57602 | |
| The Badmen | 1963 | L2L-1011 | |
| Mexico: Its Cultural Life in Music and Art | 1964 | LL-1015 LL-1016 XLP 76001 | |
| The Irish Uprising 1916–1922 | 1966 | 32 B5 0001 | |
| The Russian Revolution | | 32-A5-0005-1 | |
| The Mormon Pioneers | | LL 1023 LS 1024 | |
| John Fitzgerald Kennedy ... As We Remember Him | | L2 L1017 | |

== Sources ==
- Roach, Helen (1970). Spoken Records (3d ed.). Scarecrow Press. ISBN 978-0-8108-0301-5. OCLC 65513.
- Stambler, Irwin; Landon, Grelun (1997). Country Music: The Encyclopedia. St. Martin's Press. ISBN 0-312-15121-7. OCLC 35331403.
