= Jane Froman =

American actress (1907–1980)

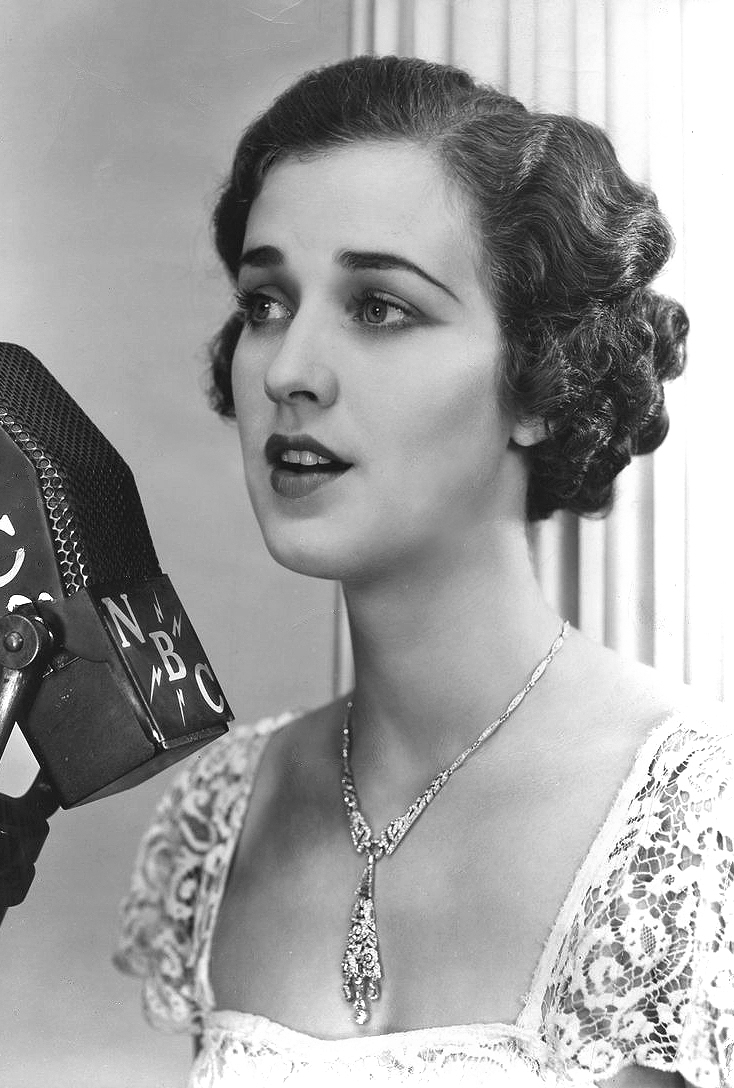
- Froman in 1934
- Born: Ellen Jane Froman; November 10, 1907; University City, Missouri, U.S.
- Died: April 22, 1980 (aged 72); Columbia, Missouri, U.S.
- Occupations: Actress, singer
- Spouses: Donald McKaig Ross (m. 1933; div. 1948) John Burn (m. 1948; div. 1956) Roland Hawes Smith (m. 1962)

Ellen Jane Froman (November 10, 1907 – April 22, 1980) was an American actress and singer. During her 30-year career, she performed on stage, radio, and television despite chronic health problems due to injuries sustained in a 1943 plane crash.

Her life story was told in the 1952 film With a Song in My Heart. She was portrayed by Susan Hayward, who was nominated for the Academy Award for Best Actress for her performance.

== Early life and education ==
Ellen Jane Froman was born in University City, Missouri, the daughter of Anna Tillman (née Barcafer) and Elmer Ellsworth Froman. Her childhood and adolescence were spent in the small Missouri town of Clinton. When Froman was about five years old, her father mysteriously disappeared and was never heard from again, although it is known he died in Los Angeles in 1936. Her mother later remarried, to William Hetzler. Froman developed a stutter around this time, which stayed with her all of her life, except when she sang.

In 1919, Froman and her mother moved to Columbia, Missouri, which she considered her hometown. In 1921, at age 13, Froman and another young lady gave a piano-and-song recital at Christian College, now Columbia College (Missouri) (where her mother was director of vocal studies). In 1926, Froman graduated from Christian College and later attended the University of Missouri School of Journalism. Two years later in 1928, Froman moved to Cincinnati, where she studied voice at the Cincinnati Conservatory of Music through 1930.

== Radio ==
Although Froman had classical voice training, early in her career she was drawn to the music of the era's songwriters, George and Ira Gershwin, Cole Porter, and Irving Berlin, who were inspiring a resurgence in popular music. She met vaudeville performer Don Ross when they auditioned for the same job at WLW radio station in Cincinnati. She first appeared on WLW October 9, 1929 "on the King Taste night club." Froman made her national network debut on NBC July 31, 1931. She was heard on the Florsheim Frolic program, broadcast on Sunday afternoons. Froman and Ross had their own program beginning July 4, 1937. The 13-episode series on the NBC Red Network was a summer replacement for The Jack Benny Program.

There, Froman joined Henry Thies' orchestra and was a featured vocalist on a number of Thies' RCA Victor recordings. Convinced that she was star material, Ross became Froman's unofficial manager and persuaded her to move to Chicago, where he worked for NBC radio. They married in 1933. That year, Froman moved to New York City, where she appeared on Chesterfield's Music that Satisfies radio program with Bing Crosby. On January 4, 1948, Froman joined the cast of The Pause That Refreshes, a Sunday evening music program sponsored by Coca-Cola on CBS. It was her first regular role on radio after a devastating U.S.O. plane crash (see below).

== Ziegfeld Follies ==
In 1933, Froman joined the Ziegfeld Follies, where she was befriended by Fannie Brice. In 1934, at age 27, she became the top-polled "girl singer." The famous composer and producer Billy Rose, when asked to name the top ten female singers, is reported to have replied, "Jane Froman and nine others." Radio listeners apparently agreed with Rose, because Froman emerged atop a nationwide poll as "the number-one female singer on the radio" in 1934.

== Film and television ==
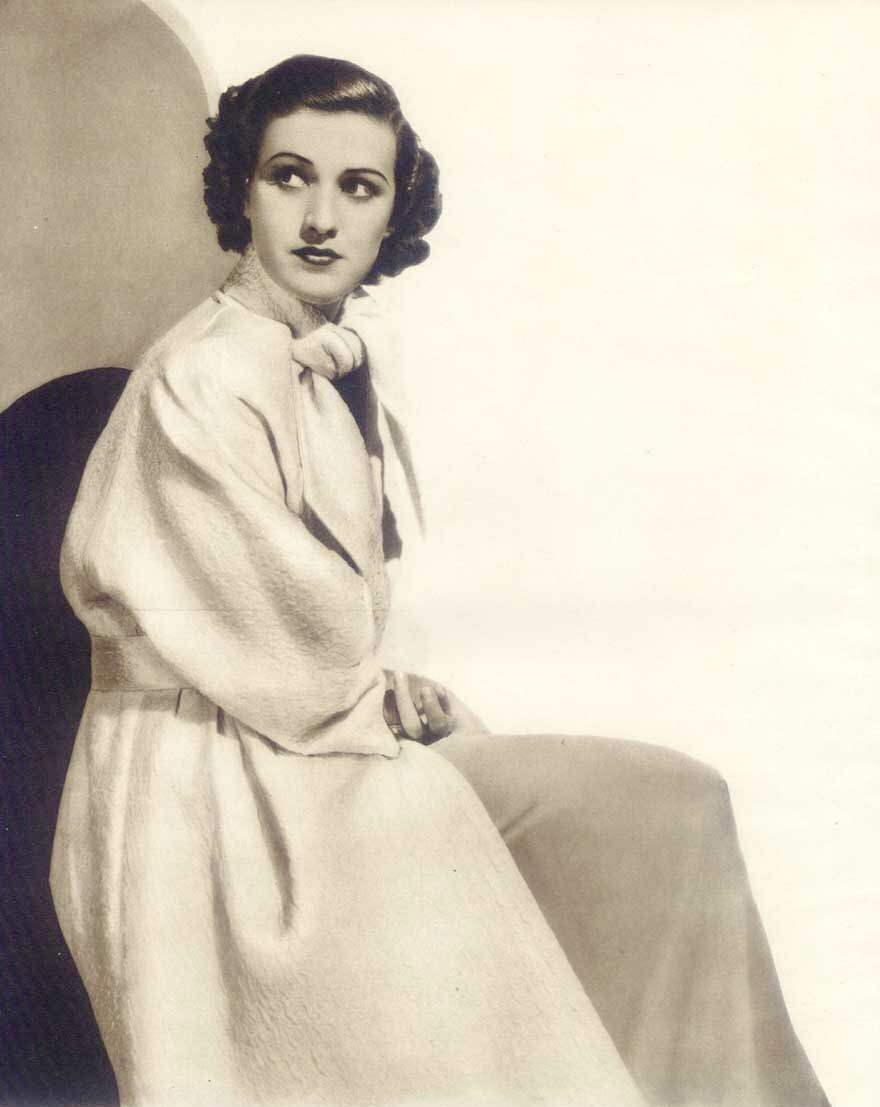
Jane Froman, Argentinean Magazine 1935

Froman is credited with three movies, Kissing Time (1933), Stars Over Broadway (1935), and Radio City Revels (1938). Beginning October 15, 1952, she was host of Jane Froman's U.S.A. Canteen, a 30-minute CBS Saturday program in which "talented members of the armed services appeared with Froman." On December 30, 1952, the length was reduced to 15 minutes with a twice-a-week schedule on Tuesdays and Thursdays. The title was changed to The Jane Froman Show in late 1953. It ended June 23, 1955.

The very first hit song to be introduced on television, I Believe, was written for Froman by the show's musicians, Ervin Drake, Irvin Graham, Jimmy Shirl, and Al Stillman, and earned her a gold record in 1953.

== USO airplane crash ==
Froman was severely injured as the result of the crash on February 22, 1943 of the Yankee Clipper, a Boeing 314 flying boat operated by Pan Am. She was travelling on the Yankee Clipper as a member of a group of USO performers. As the flying boat was banking into a descending turn prior to landing on the Tagus River in Lisbon, Portugal its left wingtip touched the surface, causing it to dig in and crash into the river. One of 15 survivors of the 39 on board, Froman sustained severe injuries: a cut below the left knee nearly severing her leg, multiple fractures of her right arm, and a compound fracture of her right leg that doctors threatened to amputate. Before flight, Froman had given her seat to another singer, Tamara Drasin, who was killed in the crash, an action which Froman's biographer Ilene Stone said "bothered her her whole life".

The fourth officer, John Curtis Burn, whose back was broken in the crash, fashioned a makeshift raft from portions of the wrecked plane to help keep himself and Froman afloat. After being rescued, they were sent to the same convalescent home, where they struggled through their long recoveries together.

Less than a year after the crash, Froman returned to Broadway to perform in a revue, Artists and Models. She wore a leg brace and used a wheelchair after having had 13 operations for her injuries. She underwent 39 operations over the years and fought amputation and wore a leg brace the remainder of her life.

Froman returned to Europe and entertained American troops in 1945. Despite having to walk with crutches, she gave 95 shows throughout Europe. During the late 1940s, Froman became addicted to painkillers and when they did not ease the pain, supplementing them with alcohol. She eventually overcame both addictions. During this time, Froman struggled with her mental health. In 1949 she entered the Menninger Clinic in Topeka, Kansas to be treated for depression. She greatly benefitted from her six-month stay at the clinic.

Froman was a celebrity guest on the March 1, 1953, episode of What's My Line, when panelist Hal Block reminded her that he was supposed to be on the same flight, which she confirmed.

Jane Froman and fellow survivor Gypsy Markoff sued Pan American using the services of lawyer Harry A. Gair, a pioneer in the field of aviation crash litigation. Under the compensatory provisions of the Federal Employees' Compensation Act a private law passed in 1958 awarded Jane Froman $23,403.58 as compensation for her injuries received in the crash.

== With a Song in My Heart and later career ==
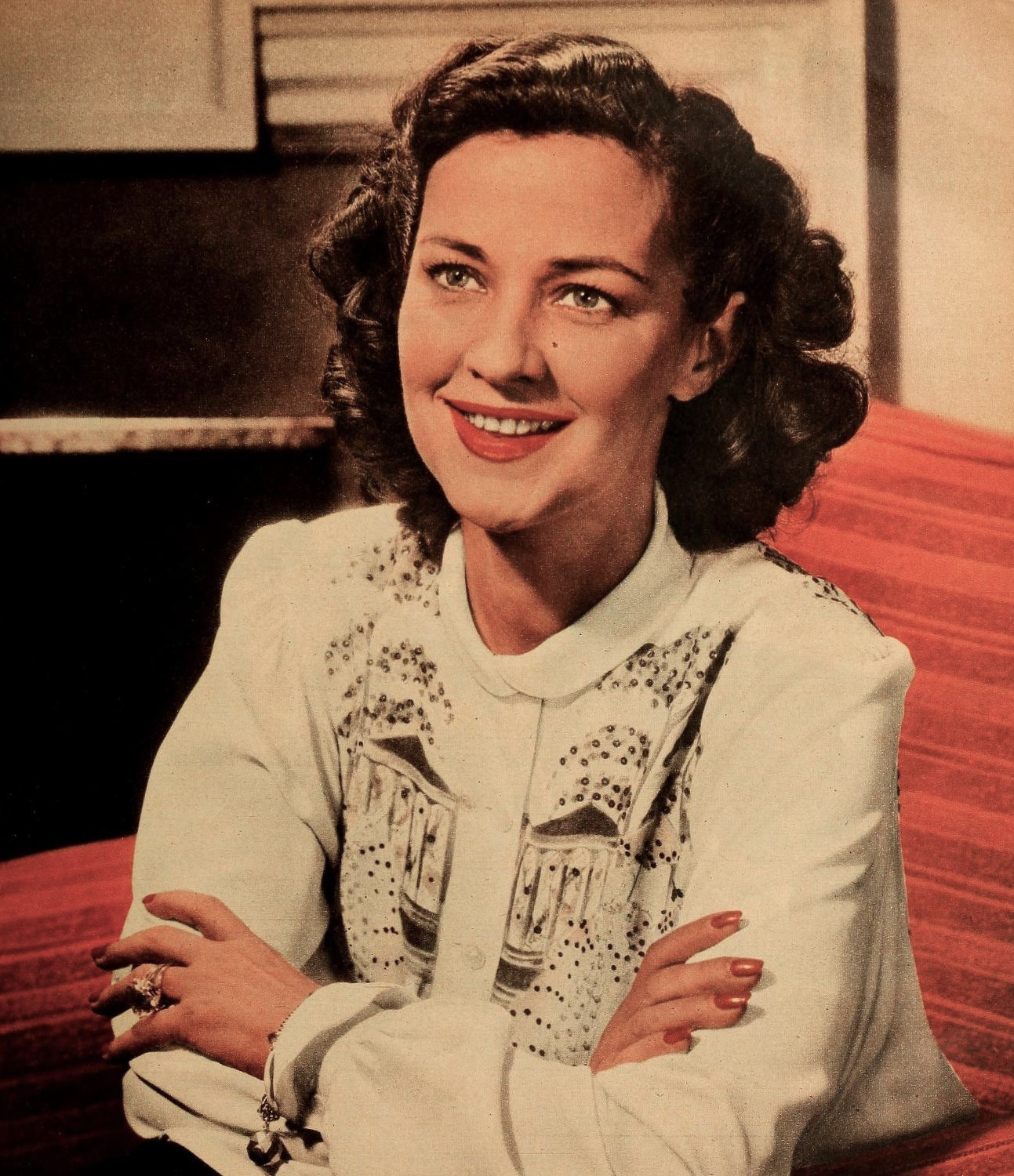
Froman in 1953

Froman's life story was the subject of the movie With a Song in My Heart (1952), starring Susan Hayward as Jane. Froman was deeply involved in the film's production: she supplied Hayward's singing voice and served as the film's technical advisor. The Capitol album of songs from the movie, also titled With a Song in My Heart, was the number one best-selling album of 1952 and remained in the catalogue for many years. In 2003 DRG Records reissued the album on a CD along with the 1952 revival cast album of Pal Joey, in which Froman sang the role made famous by Vivienne Segal, Vera Simpson.

In 1996, Collectors' Choice Music issued a CD titled Jane Froman on Capitol, a collection of her Capitol Records singles and tracks from albums.

In 1998, London-based Jasmine Records released a CD titled My Heart Speaks, a compilation of 21 of her recordings.

After Jane Froman's U.S.A. Canteen ended in 1956, Froman appeared on various television programs over the next few years. She also appeared on stage in Las Vegas.

== Family ==
The only surviving child of Anna T. Barcafer and Elmer Ellsworth Froman, Froman married Donald McKaig Ross in September 1933; they divorced in 1948. She then married John C. Burn on March 12, 1948; Burn had been a crew member on the Yankee Clipper when it crashed; that union ended in divorce in 1956. Froman later moved back to Columbia, Missouri, and rekindled her relationship with an old college friend, Rowland Hawes Smith. The couple were married on June 22, 1962.

== Life after stardom ==
In 1961, Froman retired to her home in Columbia, Missouri. After her retirement, Froman continued the volunteer work for which she was known throughout her career. She devoted more time to groups, such as the Easter Seals campaign and the Missouri Mental Health Association.

In 1969, Froman came out of retirement to sing in a Christmas program at Arrow Rock, Missouri, which helped aid the Jane Froman Music Camp. Froman started this project to help young people develop their musical talents.

== Death ==
Froman died April 22, 1980, aged 72, at her home in Columbia, Missouri of cardiac arrest caused by chronic heart and lung disease. She reportedly never fully recovered from an automobile accident on December 24, 1979.

Her funeral was held on April 25, 1980, in Calvary Episcopal Church in Columbia and she was interred in Columbia Cemetery.

== Charitable service ==
In 1957, she started the Jane Froman Foundation, which assisted the children's hospital at the Menninger Clinic, which the funds from her many fan clubs help support. Froman volunteered with numerous charitable organizations, two being the Easter Seals campaign, which helps individuals with developmental disabilities, and the Missouri Mental Health Association.

== Legacy ==
Froman was known for her contralto vocals. There are three biographies about Froman, the first two written by Ilene Stone: One Little Candle: Remembering Jane Froman and Jane Froman, Missouri's First Lady of Song. In addition, a newer, in-depth biography, Say It With Music – The Life and Legacy of Jane Froman, by Barbara Seuling, was published on November 10, 2007, to coincide with the centennial of Froman's birth.

In honor of what would have been Froman's 100th birthday, a gala, The Jane Froman Centennial Celebration was held in Columbia, Missouri, the weekend of November 9–11, 2007. During the celebration, Mayor Darwin Hindman of Columbia declared November 10, 2007 "Jane Froman Day." A DVD of the movie With a Song in My Heart with added new segments was premiered on November 9, 2007, and is now widely distributed by Fox Home Entertainment.

For her numerous contributions, Froman was awarded three stars on the Hollywood Walk of Fame: for Radio at 6321 Hollywood Blvd., for Recording at 6145 Hollywood Blvd., and for Television at 1645 Vine Street in Hollywood, California.

== Discography ==
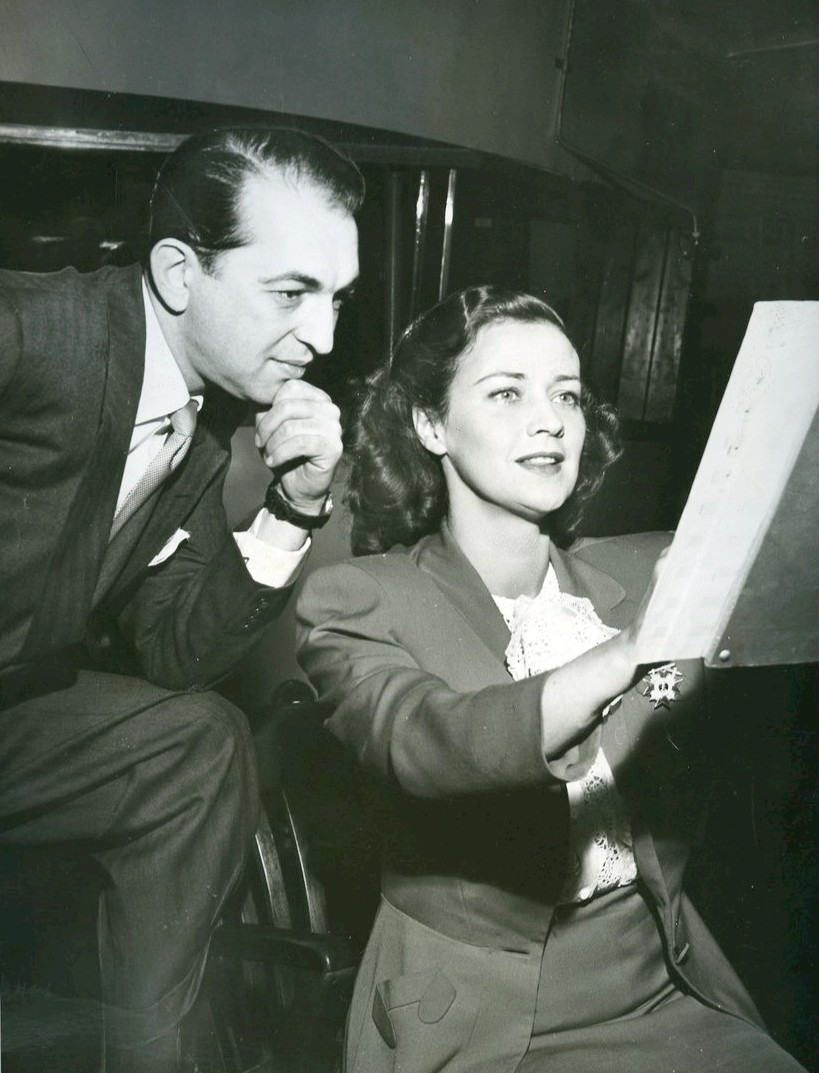
Percy Faith with Jane Froman, 1948

Albums
Title	Other artists	Record Label	Year
With a Song in My Heart	N/A	Capitol Records	1952
Souvenir Album	N/A	Decca Records	1952
Yours Alone	N/A	Capitol Records	1953
Jane Froman and Orchestra	N/A	Royale Records	1954
Gems from Gershwin	Felix Knight, Sunny Skylar	RCA Victor	1954
Faith	N/A	Capitol Records	1956
Songs at Sunset	N/A	Capitol Records	1957
A Right to Sing the Blues	N/A	AEI Records	1980
Moonlight and Roses	Lanny Ross	Royale Records	Unknown

Singles & EPs
Title	Other artists	Record label	Year
"Melancholy Baby" / "Lost in a Fog"	N/A	Decca Records	1934
"Boy! What Love Has Done to Me!" / "Tonight"	N/A	Columbia Records	1941
"My Bill" / "O sole mio"	Andre Kostelanetz And His Orchestra, Nino Martini	V-Disc	1946
"For You, for Me, for Evermore" / "A Garden in the Rain"	N/A	Majestic Records	1946
"You, So It's You!" / "Linger in My Arms a Little Longer, Baby"	Jerry Gray And His Orchestra	Majestic Records	1946
"I Got Lost in His Arms" / "Millionaires Don't Whistle"	Jerry Gray And His Orchestra	Majestic Records	1946
"I Like the Sunrise" / "For Every Man There's a Woman" / "What Is This Thing Called Love?"	Duke Ellington And His Orchestra, Percy Faith And Orchestra	V-Disc	1948
"I'll Walk Alone"	N/A	Capitol Records	1952
"Wish You Were Here" / "Mine"	N/A	Capitol Records	1952
"Who's Your Little Who-Zis!" / "Hands Across the Table"	Dean Martin	Capitol Records	1952
"Blue Moon" / "With a Song in My Heart"	N/A	Capitol Records	1952
"Laughing" / "Stay Where You Are"	N/A	Capitol Records	1952
"Cling to Me" / "Can't Get Out of This Mood"	N/A	Capitol Records	1952
"With a Song in My Heart" / "I'll Walk Alone"	N/A	Capitol Records	1952
"My Love, My Life" / "Stay Where You Are"	N/A	Capitol Records	1952

== Filmography ==
Films
Title	Role	Director	Year
Kissing Time	Miss Sullivan	Roy Mack	1933
Stars Over Broadway	Joan Garrett	William Keighley	1935
Radio City Revels	Jane Froman	Benjamin Stoloff	1938

== Broadway experience ==
Musicals
Title	Role(s)	Location	Performances	Opening Date	Closing Date
Ziegfeld Follies of 1934	A Little Woman, The Bride, Singer of "Suddenly," "Moon About Town," "Green Eyes"	Winter Garden Theatre	182	Jan 4, 1934	Jun 9, 1934
Keep Off the Grass	The Girl, Singer of "This Is Spring," "Clear Out of This World," "Look Out For My Heart," "This is Winter"	Broadhurst Theatre	44	May 23, 1940	Jun 29, 1940
Laugh, Town, Laugh!	Performer	Alvin Theatre	65	Jun 22, 1942	Jul 25, 1942
Artists and Models [1943]	Performer	Broadway Theatre (53rd Street)	27	Nov 5, 1943	Nov 27, 1943

== See also ==
- University of Missouri School of Music
