= Liberace =

American musician and actor (1919–1987)

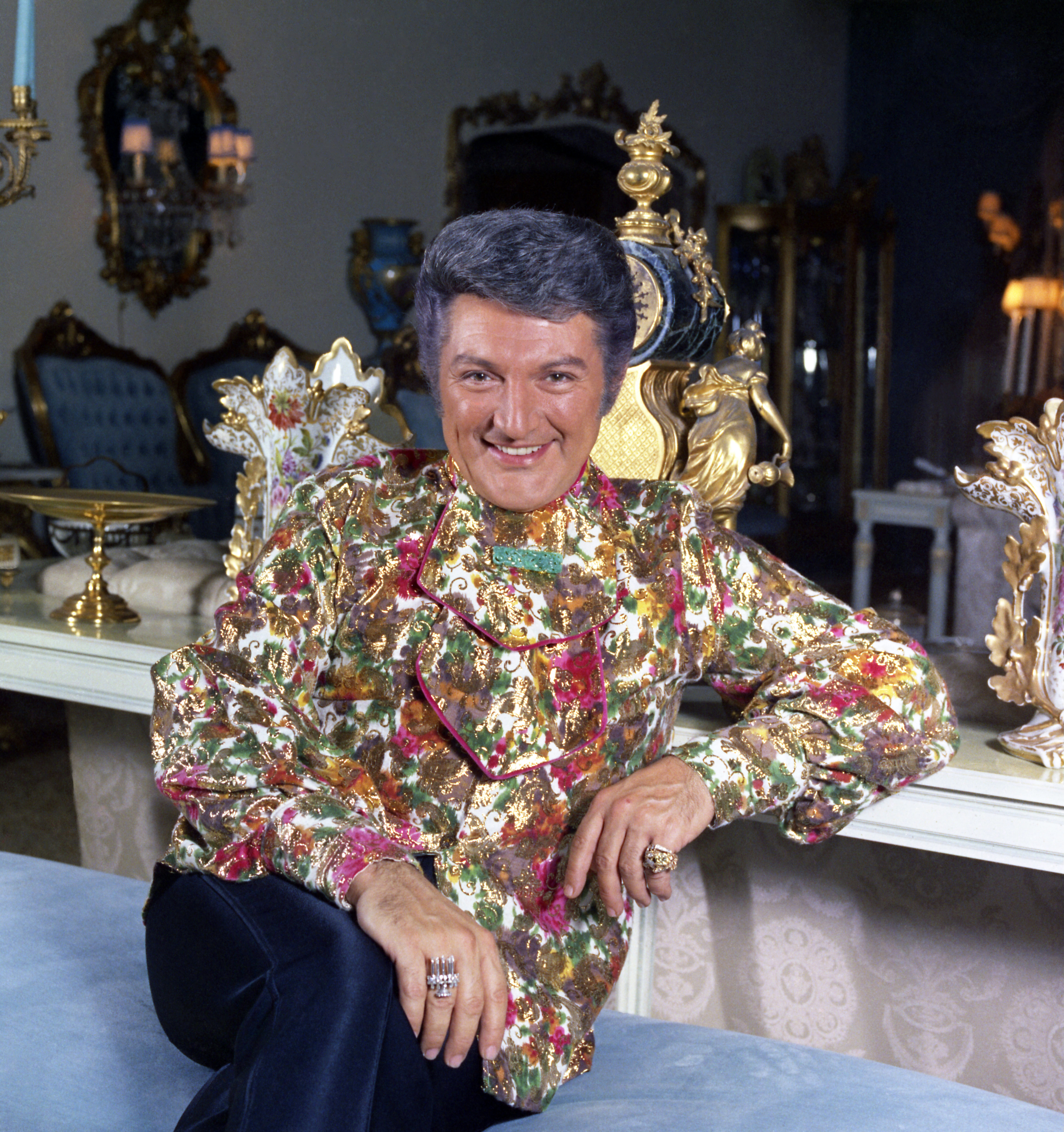
- Photo portrait by Allan Warren, 1973
- Born: Władziu Valentino Liberace; May 16, 1919; West Allis, Wisconsin, U.S.
- Died: February 4, 1987 (aged 67); Palm Springs, California, U.S.
- Resting place: Forest Lawn, Hollywood Hills Cemetery
- Other names: Walter Busterkeys; Walter Liberace; Lee; The Glitter Man; Mr. Showmanship
- Occupations: Pianist; singer; entertainer; actor
- Years active: 1936–1986
- Musical career
- Genres: Traditional pop; easy listening; big band; swing; jazz; boogie-woogie; classical
- Instruments: Piano; vocals
- Labels: Columbia; Dot

Władziu Valentino Liberace (Note: English: /ˈvwɑːdʒuː ˌvælənˈtiːnoʊ ˌlɪbəˈrɑːtʃi/ VWAH-joo VAL-ən-TEE-noh LIB-ə-RAH-chee, Polish: [ˈvwad͡ʑu], Italian: [valenˈtiːno libeˈraːtʃe].) (May 16, 1919 – February 4, 1987) was an American pianist, singer, and actor. He was born in Wisconsin to parents of Italian and Polish origin and enjoyed a career spanning four decades of concerts, recordings, television, motion pictures, and endorsements. At the height of his fame, from the 1950s to 1970s, he was the highest-paid entertainer in the world, with established concert residencies in Las Vegas and an international touring schedule.

Liberace became popular with general audiences through performances that included showmanship and elaborate costumes and choreography. Critical reception was mixed, with some believing his playing was flashy but lacked depth.

In 1959 Liberace successfully sued the Daily Mirror for libel after they published an article implying he was homosexual (which was criminalized at the time). Later, in 1982, he was sued by his lover and chauffeur, Scott Thorson, for palimony. He continued to deny he was homosexual, and died of AIDS-related cytomegalovirus pneumonia in 1987.

== Early life and education ==
Władziu Valentino Liberace (known as Lee to his friends and Walter to family) was born on May 16, 1919, in West Allis, Wisconsin, a suburb of Milwaukee. His grandfather Valentino Liberace (1836–1909) was a casket maker from Formia in Central Italy, where his father, musician Salvatore ("Sam") Liberace (1885–1977), was born. His mother, Frances Zuchowski (1891–1980), was born in Menasha, Wisconsin, and was of Polish descent. Liberace had an identical twin who died at birth. He had three surviving siblings: a brother George (who was a violinist), a sister Angelina, and younger brother Rudy (Rudolph Valentino Liberace, named after the actor due to his mother's interest in show business).

Liberace's father played the French horn in bands and cinemas, and often worked as a factory worker or laborer. While Sam encouraged music in his family, his wife Frances, despite having been a concert pianist before her marriage, believed music lessons and a record-player to be unaffordable luxuries. This disagreement caused family disputes. Liberace later said, "My dad's love and respect for music created in him a deep determination to give as his legacy to the world, a family of musicians dedicated to the advancement of the art."

Liberace began playing the piano at age four. While Sam took his children to concerts to further expose them to music, he was a taskmaster demanding high standards from the children in both practice and performance. Liberace's prodigious talent was evident from his early years. By age 7, he was capable of memorizing difficult pieces. He studied the technique of Polish pianist Ignacy Jan Paderewski. Aged eight, he met Paderewski backstage after a concert at the Pabst Theater in Milwaukee. "I was intoxicated by the joy I got from the great virtuoso's playing", Liberace said later. "My dreams were filled with fantasies of following his footsteps...Inspired and fired with ambition, I began to practice with a fervour that made my previous interest in the piano look like neglect." Paderewski later became a family friend as well as Liberace's mentor, to whom the protégé never missed any opportunities to pay tribute.

The Depression was financially hard on the Liberace family. In childhood, Liberace suffered from a speech impediment; as a teen, he was taunted by neighborhood children who mocked him for his effeminate personality, his avoidance of sports, and his fondness for cooking and the piano. Liberace concentrated on his piano playing with the help of music teacher Florence Kelly, who oversaw Liberace's musical development for ten years. He gained experience playing popular music in theaters, on local radio, and for dancing classes, clubs, and weddings.

In 1934, he played jazz piano with a school group named The Mixers and later with other groups. Liberace performed in cabarets and strip clubs; although Sam and Frances disapproved, their son was earning a living during hard times. For a while, Liberace adopted the stage name Walter Busterkeys. He showed an interest in draftsmanship, design, and painting, and he became a fastidious dresser and a follower of fashion. By this time, he was displaying a penchant for turning eccentricities into attention-getting practices, and he earned popularity at school despite some making him an object of ridicule.

== Career ==
=== Early career ===
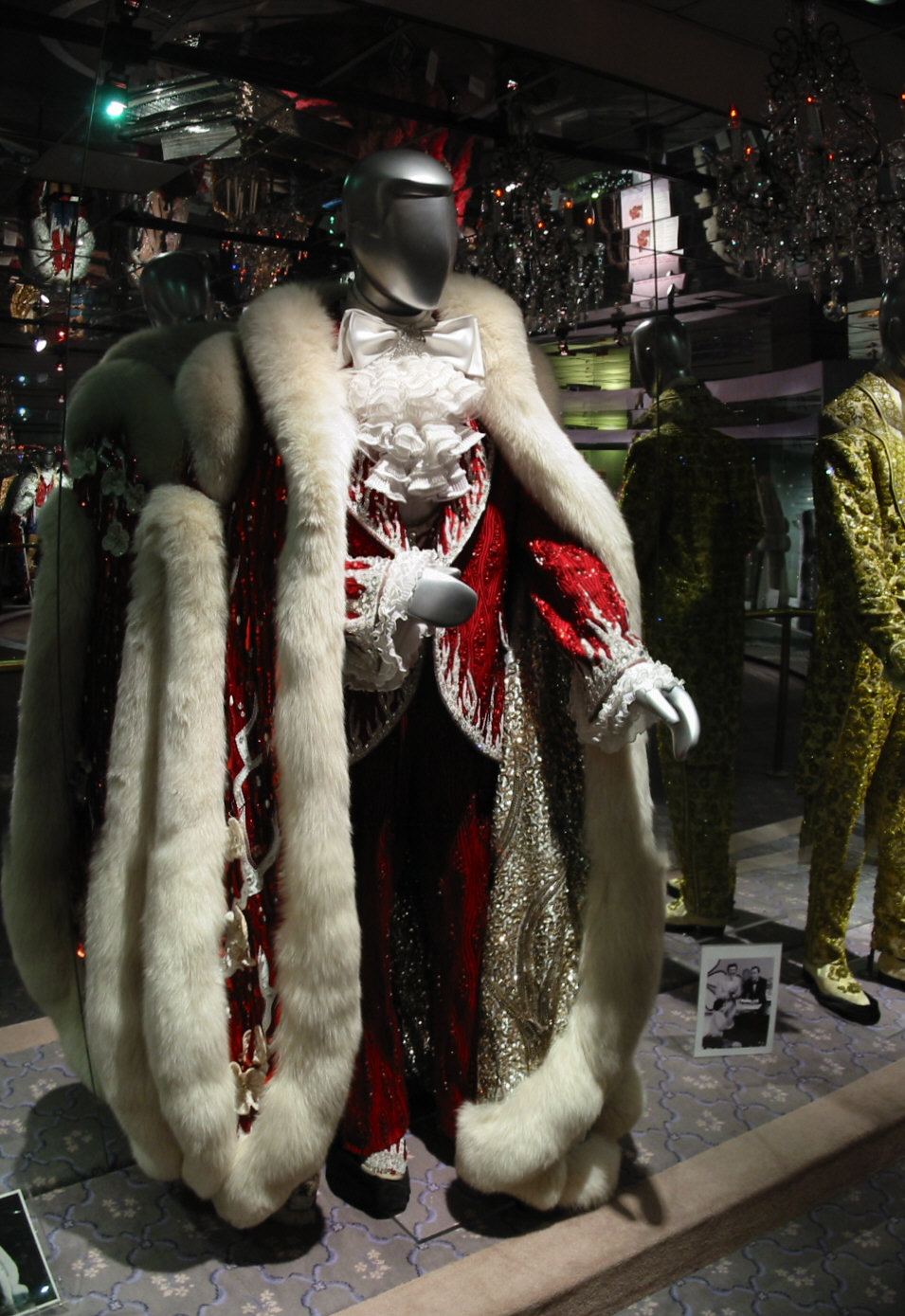
Liberace's early-1980s Christmas costume, worn at the Las Vegas Hilton and Radio City Music Hall: designed by Michael Travis, with fur design by Anna Nateece, the costume was one of many at the Liberace Museum.

A participant in a formal classical music competition in 1937, Liberace was praised for his "flair and showmanship". At the end of a traditional classical concert in La Crosse, Wisconsin, in 1939, Liberace played his first requested encore, the popular comedy song "Three Little Fishies". He later stated that he played the popular tune in the styles of several different classical composers. The 19-year-old played with the Chicago Symphony Orchestra on January 15, 1940, at the Pabst Theater in Milwaukee, performing Liszt's Second Piano Concerto under the baton of Hans Lange, for which he received strong reviews. He also toured in the Midwest.

From 1942 to 1944, Liberace moved from straight classical performance and reinvented his act to one featuring "pop with a bit of classics" or, as he called it, "classical music with the boring parts left out". In the early 1940s, he struggled in New York City, but by the mid-1940s, he was performing in nightclubs in major cities around the United States and "gained national exposure through his performance contracts with the Statler and Radisson hotel chains", largely abandoning classical music. He changed from a classical pianist to an entertainer and showman, unpredictably and whimsically mixing the serious with light fare, e.g., Chopin with "Home on the Range".

For a while, he played piano along with a phonograph on stage, a gimmick that helped gain him attention. He added interaction with the audience: taking requests, talking with the patrons, making jokes, and giving lessons to chosen audience members. He began to pay greater attention to such details as staging, lighting, and presentation. The transformation to entertainer was driven by Liberace's desire to connect directly with his audiences, and secondarily by the reality of the difficult, top-flight competition in the classical-piano world.

In 1943, he began to appear in Soundies, the 1940s precursor to music videos. He recreated two flashy numbers from his nightclub act, the standards "Tiger Rag" and "Twelfth Street Rag". In these films, he was billed as Walter Liberace. Both Soundies were later released to the home-movie market by Castle Films. In 1944, he made his first appearance in Las Vegas, which later became his principal venue.

He was playing at the best clubs, finally appearing at the Persian Room in 1945, and Variety wrote "Liberace looks like a cross between Cary Grant and Robert Alda. He has an effective manner, attractive hands which he spotlights properly, and withal, rings the bell in the dramatically lighted, well-presented, showmanly routine. He should snowball into the box office." The Chicago Times was similarly impressed: He "made like Chopin one minute and then turns on a Chico Marx bit the next."

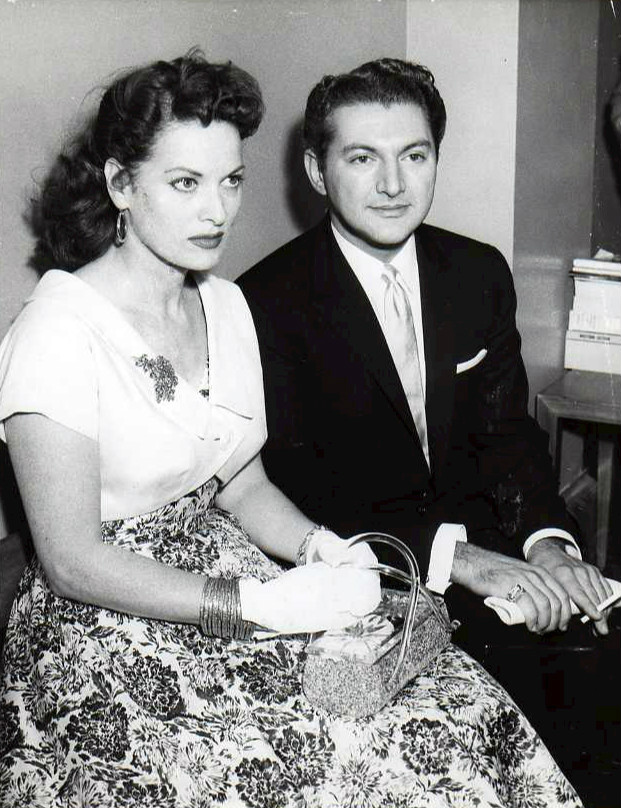
Liberace with actress Maureen O'Hara during a court hearing in 1957

During this time, Liberace worked to refine his act. He added the candelabrum as his trademark, inspired by a similar prop in the Chopin biopic A Song to Remember (1945). He adopted Liberace as his stage name, making a point in press releases that it was pronounced "Liber-Ah-chee". He wore white tie and tails for better visibility in large halls. Besides clubs and occasional work as an accompanist and rehearsal pianist, Liberace played for private parties, including ones at the Park Avenue home of millionaire oilman J. Paul Getty. By 1947, he was billing himself as "Liberace—the most amazing piano virtuoso of the present day."

In 1953, Liberace signed with Louis Snader, a California theater owner and TV producer whose telescriptions (short film clips) were used as fillers on local stations across the country. Liberace was replacing Korla Pandit, who parted ways with Snader due to a contract dispute. According to Eric Christiansen, the filmmaker who made Pandit's biopic: "[Liberace] used the same sets and took credit for his staring into the camera and breaking that wall. He felt like Liberace stole his soul."

Requiring a piano to match his growing presence, Liberace bought a rare, oversized, gold-leafed Blüthner Grand, which he hyped up in his press kit as a "priceless piano". Later, he performed with an array of extravagant, custom-decorated pianos, some encrusted with rhinestones and mirrors. He moved to the Los Angeles neighborhood of North Hollywood in 1947 and was performing at local clubs, such as Ciro's and The Mocambo, for stars such as Rosalind Russell, Clark Gable, Gloria Swanson and Shirley Temple. He did not always play to packed rooms, and he learned to perform with extra energy to thinner crowds to maintain his enthusiasm.

Liberace created a publicity machine that helped to make him a star. Despite his success in the supper-club circuit, where he was often an intermission act, his ambition was to reach larger audiences as a headliner and a television, movie and recording star. Liberace began to expand his act and made it more extravagant, with more costumes and a larger supporting cast. His large-scale Las Vegas act became his hallmark, expanding his fan base and making him wealthy.

His New York City performance at Madison Square Garden in 1954, which earned him a record $138,000 (equivalent to $1,650,000 in 2025) for one performance, was more successful than the great triumph his idol Paderewski had made 20 years earlier. He was mentioned as a sex symbol in The Chordettes 1954 No. 1 hit "Mr. Sandman". By 1955, he was making $50,000 per week (equivalent to $600,932 in 2025) at the Riviera Hotel and Casino in Las Vegas and had over 200 official fan clubs with 250,000 members. He was making over $1 million per year from public appearances and millions from television. Liberace was frequently covered by the major magazines, and he became a pop-culture superstar, but he became the butt of jokes by comedians and the public.

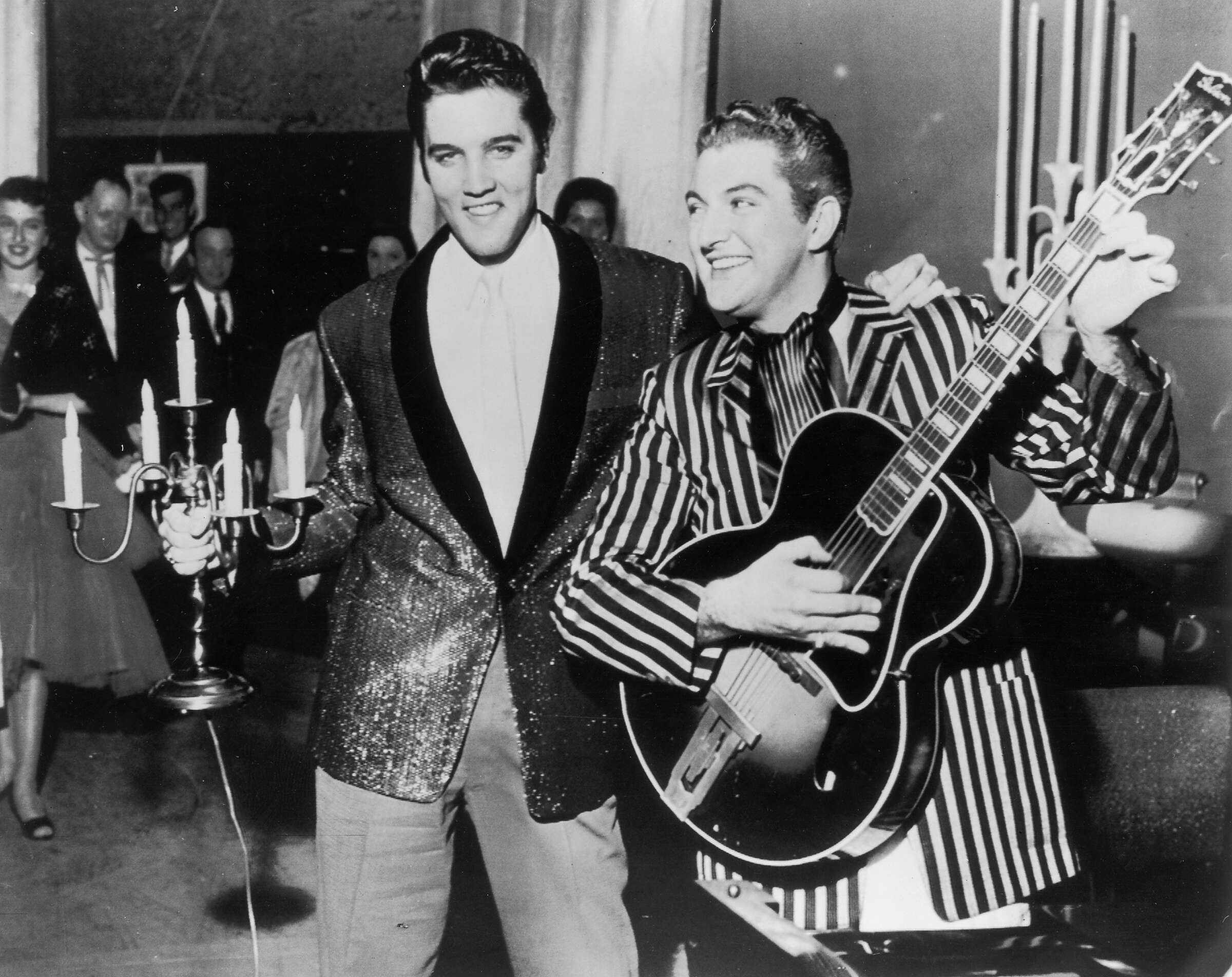
Liberace with Elvis Presley in 1956

Liberace appeared on the March 8, 1956, episode of the TV quiz program You Bet Your Life, hosted by Groucho Marx, where he stated that he was the only person in the US registered to vote using only a single name.

Music critics were generally harsh in their assessment of his piano playing. Critic Lewis Funke wrote after a Carnegie Hall concert, Liberace's music "must be served with all the available tricks, as loud as possible, as soft as possible, and as sentimental as possible. It's almost all showmanship topped by whipped cream and cherries." Even worse to his critics was his apparent lack of reverence and fidelity to the great composers. "Liberace recreates—if that is the word—each composition in his own image. When it is too difficult, he simplifies it. When it is too simple, he complicates it." They referred to his "sloppy technique" that included "slackness of rhythms, wrong tempos, distorted phrasing, an excess of prettification and sentimentality, a failure to stick to what the composer has written."

Liberace once stated, "I don't give concerts. I put on a show." Unlike the concerts of classical pianists that normally ended with applause and a retreat off-stage, Liberace's shows ended with the public invited on-stage to touch his clothes, piano, jewelry and hands. Kisses, handshakes, hugs and caresses usually followed. A critic summarized his appeal near the end of Liberace's life: "Mr. Showmanship has another more potent, drawing power to his show: the warm and wonderful way he works his audience. Surprisingly enough, behind all the glitz glitter, the corny false modesty, and the shy smile, Liberace exudes a love that is returned to him a thousand-fold."

=== Early television work and The Liberace Show ===
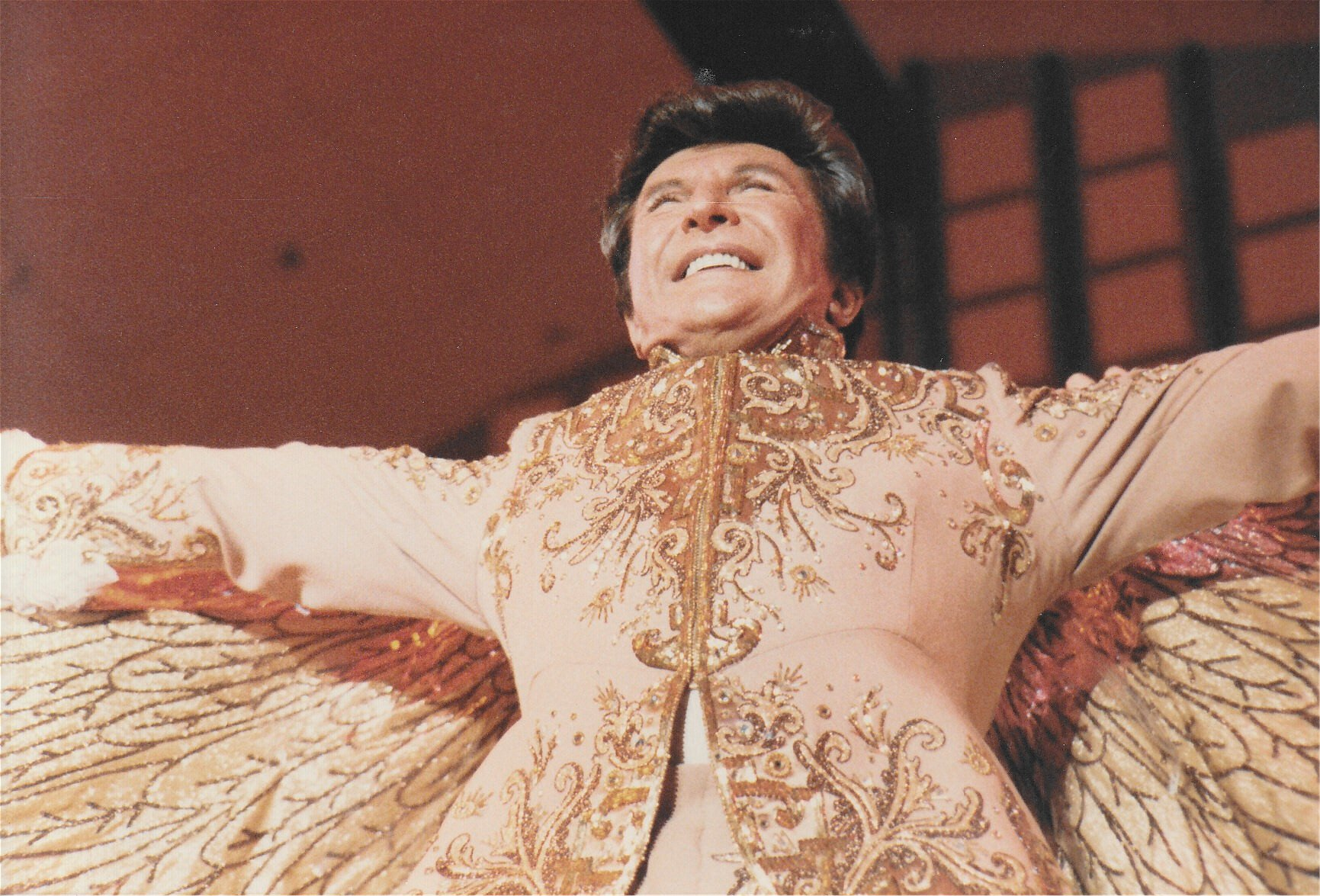
Liberace performing in 1983

Liberace mostly bypassed radio before trying a television career, thinking radio unsuitable given his act's dependence on the visual. Despite his enthusiasm about the possibilities of television, Liberace was disappointed after his early guest appearances on The Kate Smith Show and DuMont's Cavalcade of Stars, with Jackie Gleason. Liberace was particularly displeased with the frenetic camera work and his short appearance time. He soon wanted his own show where he could control his presentation as he did with his club shows.

His first show on local television in Los Angeles was a smash hit, earning the highest ratings of any local show, which he parlayed into a sold-out appearance at the Hollywood Bowl. It led to a summer replacement program for Dinah Shore.

The 15-minute network television program The Liberace Show began on July 1, 1952, but did not lead to a regular network series. Instead, producer-director Duke Goldstone mounted a filmed, half-hour version of Liberace's local show for syndication in 1953. Each episode was filmed on a studio soundstage, with the grand piano surrounded by tasteful decor, and Liberace always addressing the camera. Canned applause and occasional laughter were added to the soundtracks, simulating a live audience. The widespread exposure of the syndicated series made the pianist more popular and prosperous than ever. His first two years' earnings from television netted him $7 million, and on future reruns, he earned up to 80% of the profits. The series yielded 148 episodes; the shows were originally aired weekly, but in later years, as the library of episodes built up, TV stations could run them daily as weekday programming. The series was syndicated by Guild Films, under the presidency of Reub Kaufman.

Guild promoted the Liberace show aggressively and shrewdly. Liberace and Columbia Records made a special phonograph record especially for the sponsors: the "A" side was the Brahms lullaby and the "B" was "Dark Eyes". Each sponsor's name was printed on the record label and on the record jacket. During a six-month period, Guild Films delivered 50,000 copies of the record to the sponsors, which they in turn gave away as premiums. "The number of Liberace records being processed for that purpose is increasing weekly," noted Kaufman. "New sponsors are joining the premium promotion with unusual enthusiasm."

Liberace learned early to add "schmaltz" to his television show and to cater to the tastes of the mass audience by joking and chatting to the camera as if performing in the viewer's own living room. He used dramatic lighting, split images, costume changes, and exaggerated hand movements to create visual interest. His television performances displayed his enthusiasm and humor.

Liberace employed "ritualistic domesticity", used by such early TV greats as Jack Benny and Lucille Ball. His brother George often appeared as a guest violinist and orchestra director, with his mother, his brother Rudy, and his sister Angelina often mentioned to lend a "family" atmosphere. Liberace began each show in the same way, then mixed production numbers with chat, and signed off each broadcast softly singing "I'll Be Seeing You", which he made his theme song. His musical selections were broad, including classics, show tunes, film melodies, Latin rhythms, ethnic songs, and boogie-woogie.

The show was immensely popular with his mostly female television audience. He drew over 30 million viewers at any one time and received 10,000 fan letters per week. His show was one of the early ones to be shown on British commercial television in the 1950s, where it was broadcast on Sunday afternoons by Lew Grade's Associated TeleVision. This exposure gave Liberace a dedicated following in the United Kingdom. Gay men found him appealing. Darden Asbury Pyron wrote, "Liberace was the first gay person Elton John had ever seen on television; he became his hero."

On June 3, 1956, Liberace appeared as the "mystery guest" on What's My Line?, where the overwhelming reaction by fans (as he was signing in) tipped off the blindfolded panel to the mega-star power of the unknown guest. Within one minute of the start of questioning, the panel had found that the guest was a musician. Panelist Arlene Francis said: "I can't think of anybody that would get screams like that, in a band, except Liberace".

=== After The Liberace Show ===
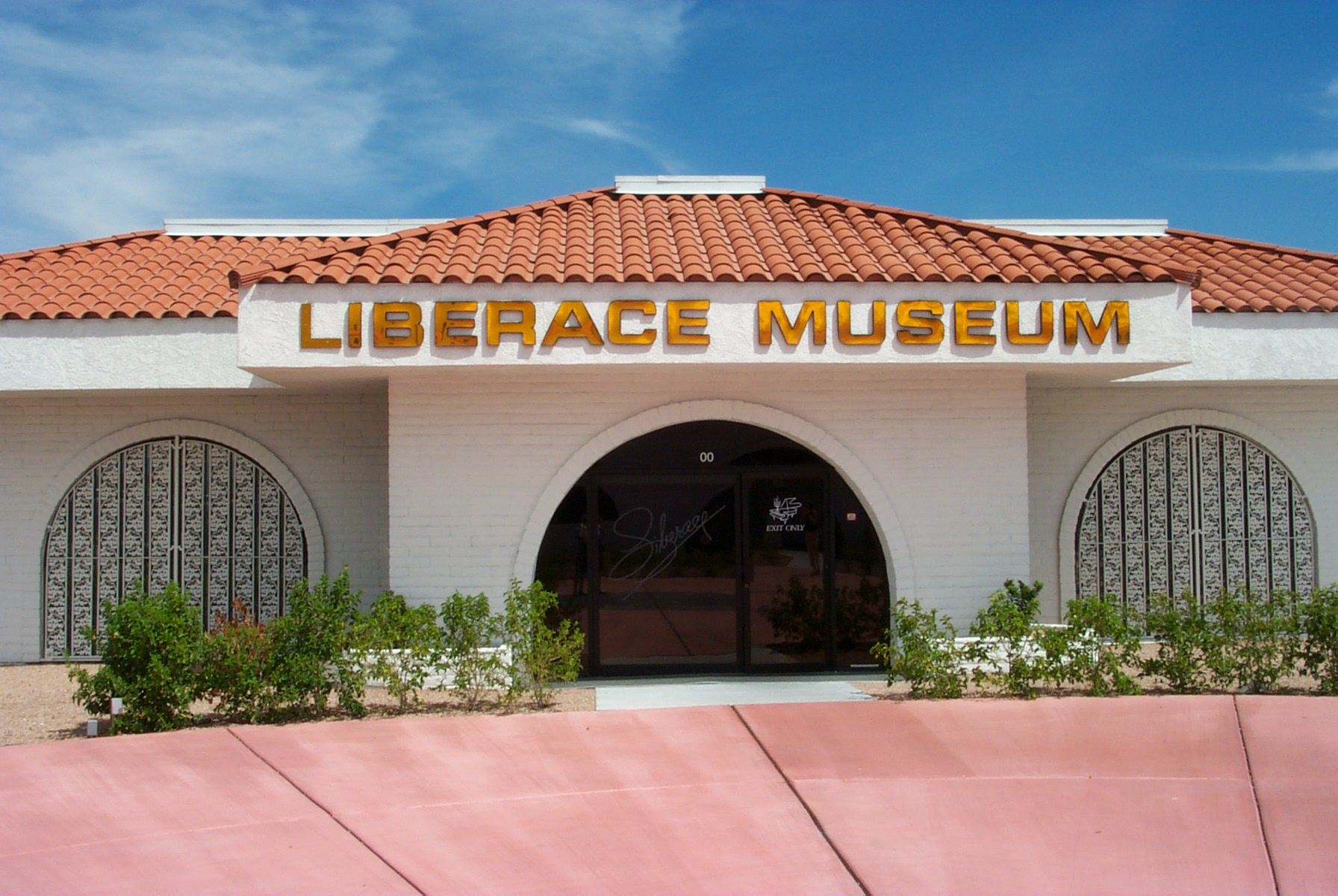
The Liberace Museum, Las Vegas, 2003

In 1956, Liberace had his first international engagement, playing successfully in Havana, Cuba. He followed with a European tour later that year. Always a devout Catholic, Liberace considered his meeting with Pope Pius XII a highlight of his life. In 1960, Liberace performed at the London Palladium with Nat King Cole and Sammy Davis Jr. (it was the first televised "command performance", now known as the Royal Variety Performance, for Queen Elizabeth II).

On July 19, 1957, hours after Liberace gave a deposition in his $25 million libel suit against Confidential magazine, two masked intruders attacked his mother in the garage of Liberace's home in Sherman Oaks, California. She was beaten and kicked, but her heavy corset may have protected her from being badly injured. Liberace was not informed about the assault until he finished his midnight show at the Moulin Rouge nightclub. Guards were hired to watch over Liberace's house and the houses of his two brothers.

Despite successful European tours, his career had in fact been slumping since 1957, but Liberace rebuilt it by appealing directly to his fan base. Through live appearances in small-town supper clubs, and with television and promotional appearances, he began to regain popularity. On November 22, 1963, he suffered kidney failure, reportedly from accidentally inhaling excessive amounts of dry cleaning fumes from his newly cleaned costumes in a dressing room, and he nearly died. He later said that what saved him from more injury was being woken by his entourage to the news that John F. Kennedy had been assassinated. Told by doctors that his condition was fatal, he began to spend his entire fortune by buying extravagant gifts of furs, jewels, and even a house for friends, but then recovered after a month.

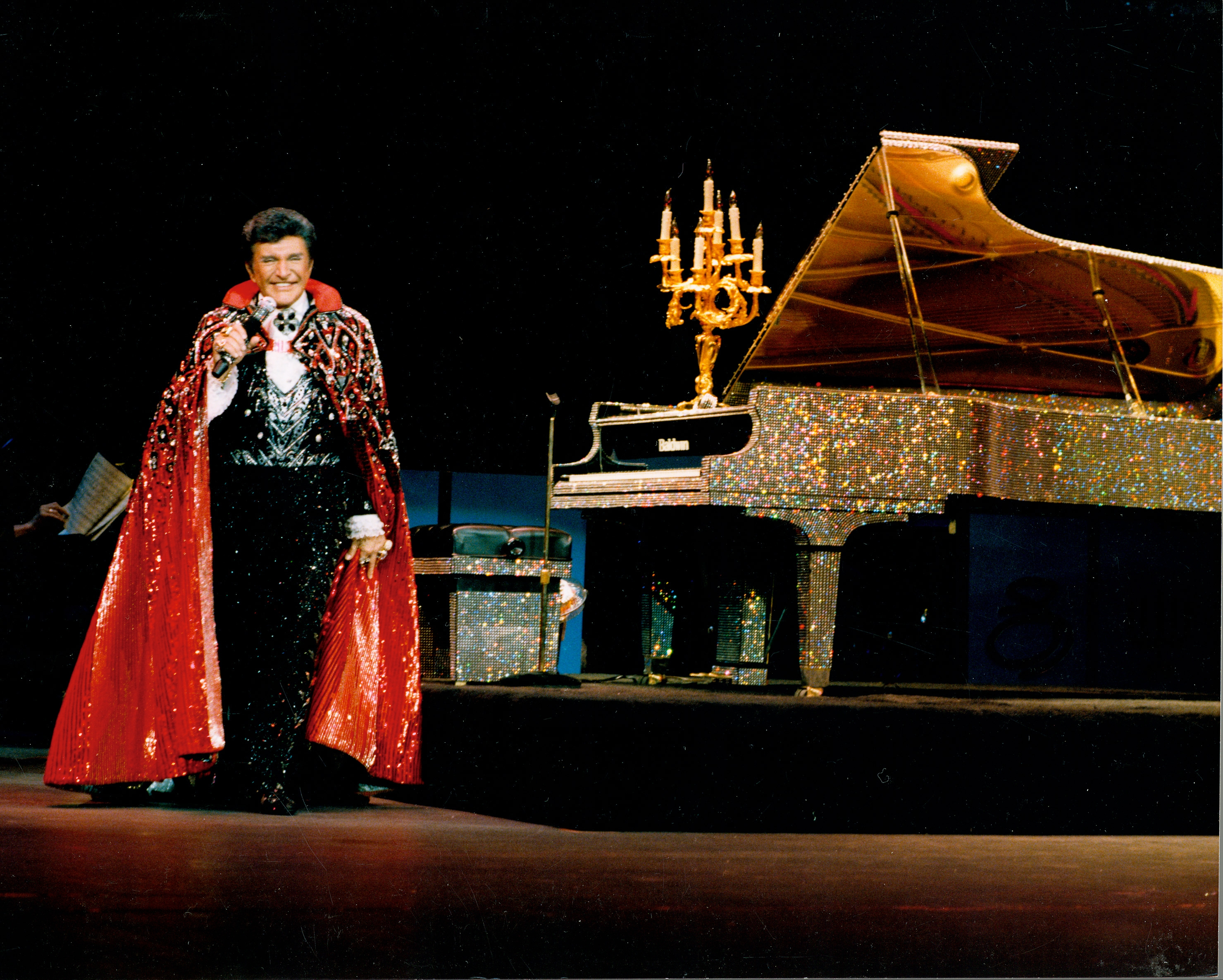
Liberace on stage in Las Vegas

Re-energized, Liberace returned to Las Vegas, and increasing the glamour and glitz, he took on the sobriquet Mr. Showmanship. As his act swelled with spectacle, he famously stated "I'm a one-man Disneyland." The costumes became more exotic (ostrich feathers, mink, capes, and huge rings), entrances and exits more elaborate (chauffeured onstage in a Rolls-Royce or dropped in on a wire like Peter Pan), choreography more complex (involving chorus girls, cars, and animals), and talented novelty acts. Juvenile acts included Australian singer Jamie Redfern and Canadian banjo player Scotty Plummer. Barbra Streisand was the most notable new adult act he introduced, appearing with him early in her career.

Liberace owned an antique shop in Beverly Hills, California, and a restaurant in Las Vegas for many years. He even published cookbooks; the most famous of which was Liberace Cooks, co-authored by cookbook guru Carol Truax, which included "Liberace Lasagna" and "Liberace Sticky Buns". The book features recipes "from his seven dining rooms" (of his Hollywood home).

Liberace's live shows during the 1970s and 1980s remained major box-office attractions at the Las Vegas Hilton and Lake Tahoe, where he earned $300,000 per week.

=== Later television work ===
Liberace made significant appearances on other shows such as The Ed Sullivan Show, The Ford Show, Starring Tennessee Ernie Ford, Edward R. Murrow's Person to Person as well as on the shows of Jack Benny and Red Skelton, on which he often parodied his own persona. A new Liberace Show premiered on ABC's daytime schedule in 1958, featuring a less flamboyant, less glamorous persona, but it failed in six months as his popularity began slumping.

Liberace received a star on the Hollywood Walk of Fame in 1960 for his contributions to the television industry. He continued to appear on television as a frequent and welcomed guest on The Tonight Show with Jack Paar in the 1960s, with memorable exchanges with Zsa Zsa Gabor and Muhammad Ali, and later with Johnny Carson.

He was Red Skelton's 1969 CBS summer replacement with his own variety hour, taped in London. Skelton and Lew Grade's production companies co-produced this program. In a cameo on The Monkees, he appeared at an avant-garde art gallery as himself, gleefully smashing a grand piano with a sledgehammer as Mike Nesmith looked on and cringed in mock agony.

In the second season of the Batman television series in 1966 with Adam West and Burt Ward, Liberace played a dual role. The concert pianist Chandell has been extorted into a life of crime as Fingers, blackmailed due to use of a player piano "roll cut by Paderewski", according to Episode 15 "The Devil's Fingers". The plan of his imposter gangster-like twin Harry, donning the costume Chandell wore at "Queen Elizabeth's coronation", to kill Chandell in a player piano roll manufacturing machine is foiled by Batman in Episode 16 "The Dead Ringers". The episodes of this two-part story were the highest-rated of all the show's episodes.

His subsequent television appearances included episodes of Here's Lucy (1970), Kojak and The Muppet Show (both 1978), all as himself. His performances in the last of these included a "Concerto for the Birds", "Misty", "Has Anybody Seen My Gal", and a rendition of "Chopsticks". Television specials were made from Liberace's show at the Las Vegas Hilton in 1978–1979, which were broadcast on CBS.

In the 1980s, he guest-starred on television shows such as Saturday Night Live (on a tenth-season episode hosted by Hulk Hogan and Mr. T) as well as the 1984 film Special People. In 1985, he appeared at the first WrestleMania as the guest timekeeper for the main event.

=== Films ===
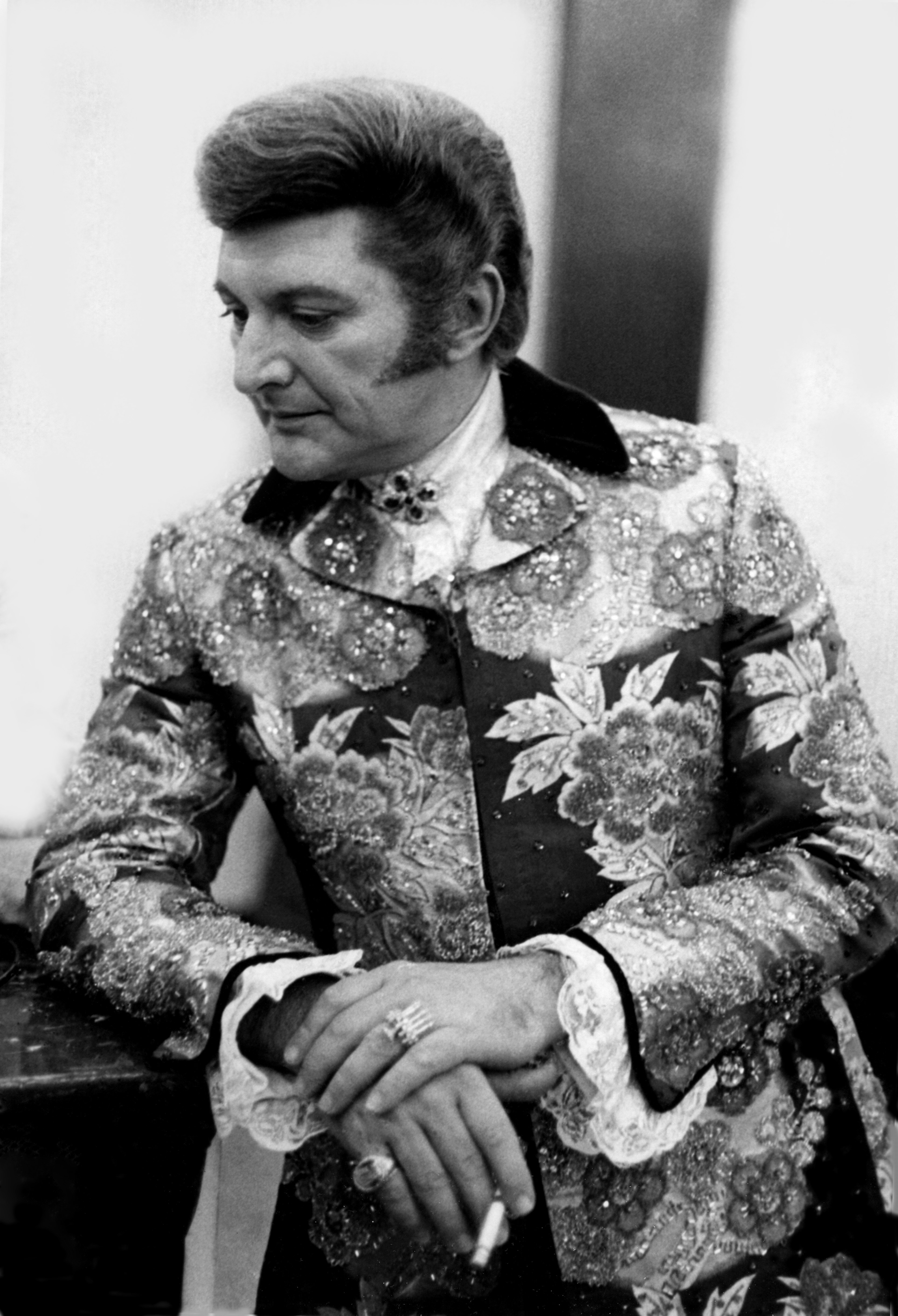
Liberace in 1968

Before his arrival in Hollywood in 1947, Liberace wanted to add acting to his list of accomplishments. His exposure to the Hollywood crowd through his club performances led to his first movie appearance in Universal's South Sea Sinner (1950), a tropical island drama starring MacDonald Carey and Shelley Winters, in which he was billed as "a Hoagy Carmichael sort of character with long hair". Liberace appeared as a guest star in two compilation features for RKO Radio Pictures. Footlight Varieties (1951) is an imitation-vaudeville hour, and the little-known sequel Merry Mirthquakes (1953) featured Liberace as master of ceremonies.

In 1955, Liberace was at the height of his career when tapped by Warner Bros. for his first starring movie Sincerely Yours (1955), a remake of The Man Who Played God (1932), as a concert pianist who turns his efforts toward helping others when his career is cut short by deafness. In April 1955, Modern Screen magazine claimed Doris Day had been most often mentioned as Liberace's leading lady, "but it is doubtful that Doris will play the role. Liberace's name alone will pack theatres and generous Liberace would like to give a newcomer a break." (Joanne Dru, an established movie actress, was the leading lady.) When Sincerely Yours was released in November, the studio mounted an ad and poster campaign with Liberace's name in huge, eccentric, building-block letters above and much larger than the title. "Fabulously yours in his first starring motion picture!" was a tag line. The other players and staff were smallish at the bottom. The film was a critical and commercial failure because Liberace proved unable to translate his eccentric on-stage persona to that of a movie leading man. Warner quickly issued a pressbook ad supplement with new "Starring" billing below the title, in equal plain letters: "Liberace, Joanne Dru, Dorothy Malone". TCM's Robert Osborne recalls a dramatic demotion: When Sincerely Yours played first run at the Orpheum in Seattle, the billing was altered even more: Joanne Dru, Dorothy Malone, and Alex Nicol above the title (with big head shots of all three) and below the title in much smaller letters: "with Liberace at the piano". Originally, Sincerely Yours was meant to be the first of a two-picture movie contract, but it proved a massive box-office flop. The studio then bought back the contract, effectively paying Liberace not to make a second movie.

The experience left Liberace so shaken that he largely abandoned his movie aspirations. He made two more big-screen appearances, but only in cameo roles. These were When the Boys Meet the Girls (1965), starring Connie Francis, where Liberace essentially played himself. He received kudos for his brief appearance as a casket salesman in The Loved One (1965), based on Evelyn Waugh's satire of the funeral business and movie industry in Southern California.

=== Recordings ===
The massive success of Liberace's syndicated television show was the main impetus behind his record sales. From 1947 to 1951, he recorded 10 discs. By 1954, it jumped to nearly 70. He released several recordings through Columbia Records, including Liberace by Candlelight (later on Dot and through direct television advertising) and sold over 400,000 albums by 1954. His most popular single was "Ave Maria", selling over 300,000 copies. His theme song was "I'll Be Seeing You", which he would customarily sing rather than play on any of his various pianos.

His albums included pop standards of the time, such as "Hello, Dolly!" and included his interpretations of the classical piano repertoire such as Chopin and Liszt, but many fans of classical music widely criticized them (as well as Liberace's skills as a pianist in general) for being "pure fluff with minimal musicianship". In his life, he received six gold records.

=== Final appearances ===
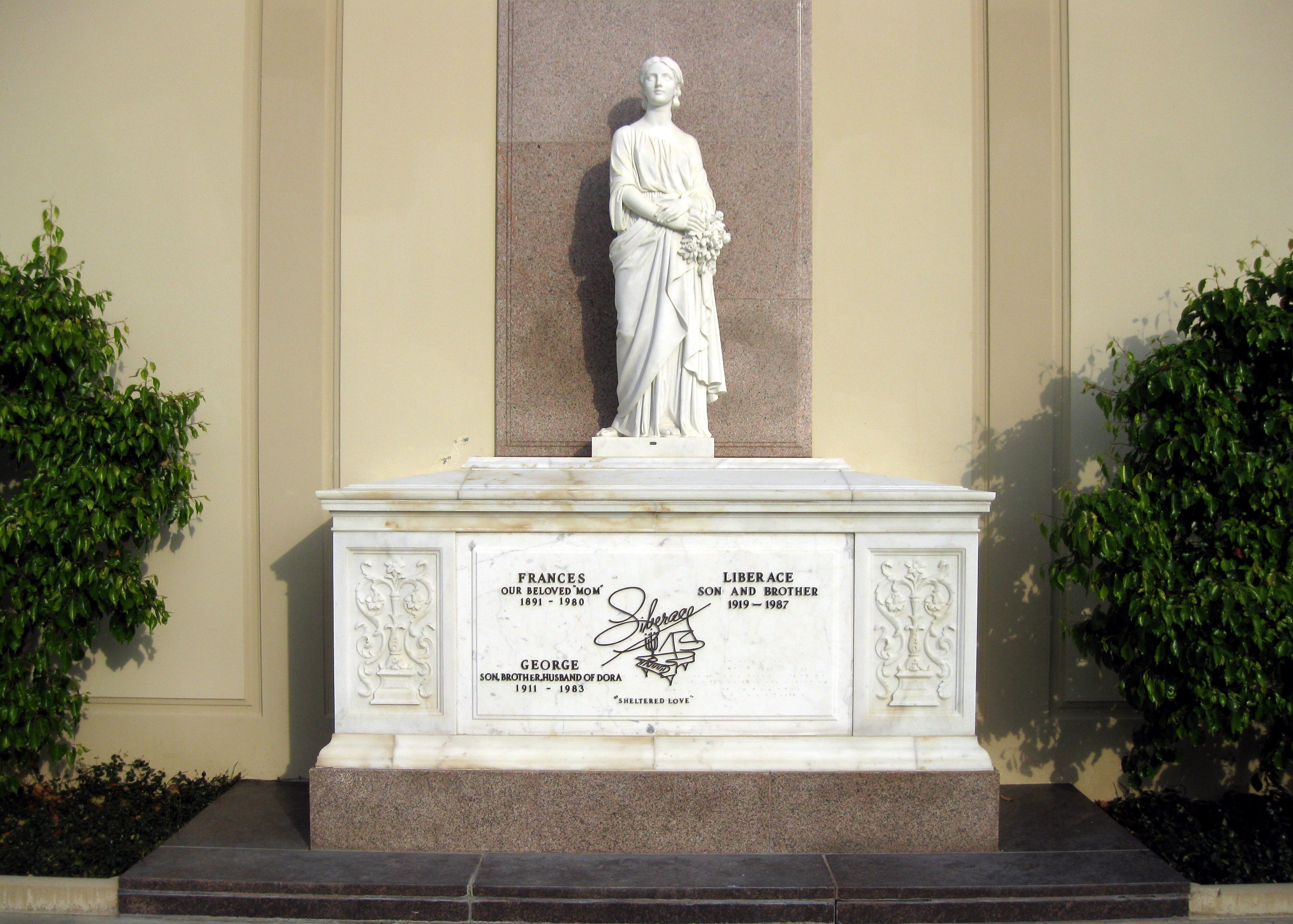
Liberace's tomb at Forest Lawn

Liberace's final stage performance was at New York's Radio City Music Hall on November 2, 1986; it was his 18th show over a tour of 21 days (from October 16), and the concert series grossed just over $2.5 million at the theater box office. His final television appearance was on Christmas Day that same year on The Oprah Winfrey Show, which had actually been videotaped in Chicago over one month earlier.

== Personal life ==
Liberace was conservative in his political and religious beliefs. He believed fervently in capitalism, and he was fascinated with royalty, ceremony and luxury. He loved to socialize and was fascinated by the rich and famous. However, he still presented himself to his fans as one of them, a Midwesterner who had earned his success through hard work, and who invited them to enjoy it with him.

In the later years of his life, having newly earned wealth, Liberace spent lavishly, displaying extravagant materialism in his life and his act. In 1953, he designed and built his first house in Sherman Oaks, California, on Valley Vista Blvd., located in the San Fernando Valley. The house featured a piano theme throughout, including a piano-shaped swimming pool that remains today. His dream home, with its lavish furnishings, elaborate bath and antiques, added to his image. He maintained a public image through hundreds of promotional tie-ins with banks, insurance companies, automobile companies, food companies, and even morticians. Liberace was an experienced pitchman and relied on the support of his vast audience of housewives. Sponsors sent him complimentary products, including his white Cadillac limousine, and he reciprocated enthusiastically: "If I am selling tuna fish, I believe in tuna fish." Liberace became bald in his middle-aged years and was so insecure about his hair loss that he began wearing elaborate hairpieces and refused to let himself be seen without his toupee, both in public and in private, even sleeping with them on.

Others criticized his proficient but flashy piano playing, his non-stop promotions, and his gaudy display of success. Outwardly, he remained undeterred, once sending a letter to a critic that stated, "Thank you for your very amusing review. After reading it, in fact, my brother George and I laughed all the way to the bank." He responded similarly to subsequent poor reviews, famously modifying it to "I cried all the way to the bank." In an appearance on The Tonight Show some years later, Liberace retold the anecdote to Johnny Carson and finished by saying "I don't cry all the way to the bank any more—I bought the bank!"

=== Lawsuits and allegations of homosexuality ===
Liberace's fame in the United States was matched for a time in the United Kingdom. In 1956, an article in the Daily Mirror by columnist Cassandra (William Connor) described Liberace as "the summit of sex—the pinnacle of masculine, feminine and neuter. Everything that he, she and it can ever want...a deadly, winking, sniggering, snuggling, chromium-plated, scent-impregnated, luminous, quivering, giggling, fruit-flavoured, mincing, ice-covered heap of mother love".

Liberace sent a telegram that read: "What you said hurt me very much. I cried all the way to the bank." He sued the newspaper for libel, testifying in a London court that he was not homosexual and that he had never taken part in homosexual acts. He was represented in court by Gilbert Beyfus, one of the great barristers of the period. Liberace won the suit, partly on the basis of Connor's use of the derogatory expression "fruit-flavoured". The case partly hinged on whether Connor knew that "fruit" was American slang implying that an individual is a homosexual. After a three-week civil trial, a jury ruled in Liberace's favor on June 16, 1959, and awarded him £8,000 in damages (around $22,400 at the time and equivalent to £162,000 in 2025), which led Liberace to repeat the catchphrase to reporters: "I cried all the way to the bank!" Liberace's popularization of the phrase inspired the title Crying All the Way to the Bank, for a detailed report of the trial based on transcripts, court reports and interviews, by the former Daily Mirror journalist Revel Barker.

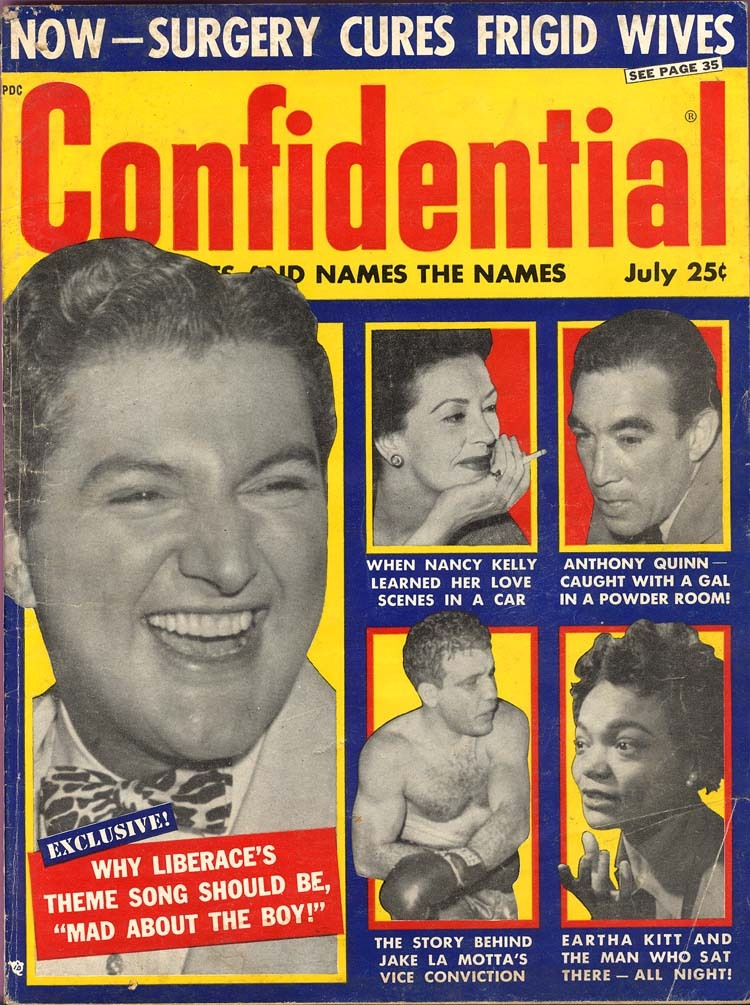
Confidential cover July 2, 1957, "Why Liberace's Theme Song Should Be 'Mad About the Boy!'"

Liberace sued and settled a similar case in the United States against Confidential. Throughout his career, gossip magazines frequently implied Liberace was homosexual, which he continued to vehemently deny. A typical issue of Confidential in 1957 stated, "Why Liberace's Theme Song Should Be 'Mad About the Boy!'"

In 1982, Scott Thorson, Liberace's 22-year-old former chauffeur and alleged live-in lover of five years, sued the pianist for $113 million in palimony after he was dismissed by Liberace. Liberace continued to deny he was homosexual, and during court depositions in 1984 he insisted Thorson was never his lover. The case was settled out of court in 1986, and Thorson received a $95,000 cash settlement plus three cars and three pet dogs worth another $20,000. Thorson stated after Liberace's death that he settled because he knew Liberace was dying and that he had intended to sue based on conversion of property rather than palimony. He later said Liberace was a "boring guy" in his private life and mostly preferred to spend his free time cooking, decorating, and playing with his dogs, and that he never played the piano outside of his public performances. Thorson said, "He (Liberace) had several decorated, ornamental pianos in the various rooms of his house, but he never played them."

Because Liberace never publicly said he was gay, knowledge of his sexuality was muddled by stories of his friendships and romantic links with women. He further obscured his sexuality in articles such as "Mature Women Are Best: TV's Top Pianist Reveals What Kind of Woman He'd Marry".

In a 2011 interview, actress and close friend Betty White said Liberace was indeed gay and that she often was used as a "beard" by his managers to counter public rumors of the musician's homosexuality.

== Illness and death ==
Liberace was secretly diagnosed HIV positive in August 1985 by his private physician in Las Vegas. Aside from telling his long-term manager Seymour Heller and a few family members and associates, Liberace kept his terminal illness a secret until the day he died and did not seek medical treatment. Scott Thorson remarked he was not aware Liberace had any health issues, and that, up until one year before his death, "he was in overall excellent shape for his age: barrel-chested and powerfully built."

In August 1986, Liberace appeared on the TV news program Good Morning America, where he gave one of his final interviews and hinted at his failing health, saying, "How can you enjoy life if you don't have your health?" Liberace was later hospitalized at Eisenhower Medical Center from January 23 to 27, 1987, for the treatment of anemia.

Liberace died in the late morning of February 4, 1987, at The Cloisters, his home in Palm Springs, California at the age of 67. He had a Catholic priest administer the last rites to him the day before his death. A memorial Mass was held at St. Anne's Catholic Church in Las Vegas.

At the time of Liberace's death, his press agent said he had died from a combination of pernicious anemia, emphysema and heart disease. Liberace's physician, Ronald Daniels, said he had died of heart failure caused by subacute encephalopathy, a degenerative brain disease. The Riverside County coroner performed an autopsy and determined that Liberace's cause of death was cytomegalovirus pneumonia, a frequent cause of death in people with AIDS. The coroner also determined that, at the time of his death, Liberace was HIV-positive, had pulmonary heart disease, and calcification of a heart valve. The coroner said that Liberace's doctor had deliberately claimed a false cause of death because heart failure is never caused by encephalopathy. Author Darden Asbury Pyron wrote that Liberace had been HIV-positive and symptomatic from 1985 until his death.

Liberace's body is entombed along with his mother and brother at Forest Lawn, Hollywood Hills Cemetery in Los Angeles. In 1994, the Palm Springs Walk of Stars dedicated a Golden Palm Star to him.

== Awards ==
Liberace was recognized during his career with two Emmy Awards, six gold albums, and two stars on the Hollywood Walk of Fame.

== Closure of Liberace Museum and Tivoli Gardens Restaurant ==
In October 2010, the Liberace Museum in Las Vegas closed after 31 years of being open to the public. In June 2011, Liberace's Tivoli Gardens Restaurant, then operated by Carluccio's, closed its location next to the museum and relocated elsewhere. According to Liberace Foundation President Jack Rappaport, the museum had been in negotiations with money interests on the Las Vegas strip to relocate the museum, but were unsuccessful. The Liberace Foundation, which provides college scholarships to up-and-coming performers, continued to function.

In January 2013, the Liberace Foundation announced plans to move the museum to downtown Las Vegas, with a targeted opening date of 2014. In 2014, however, Liberace Foundation chairman Jonathan Warren announced that the deal for the new museum had failed.

As of April 7, 2016, Liberace's cars were on display, as well as a piano and several costumes, at the Liberace Garage, located in Las Vegas.

== Depiction in media ==
- On October 2, 1988, a television film titled Liberace aired on ABC, starring Andrew Robinson as Liberace, Rue McClanahan as his mother Frances Liberace, John Rubinstein and Maris Valainis as Scott Thorson; the film had the distinct advantage of using Liberace's musical arrangements and recordings, and some of his costumes and jewelry, but it was evasive about his sexuality.
- On October 9, 1988, Liberace: Behind the Music, was aired on CBS. Victor Garber played Liberace, and Saul Rubinek played Seymour Heller, his manager (and a major consultant to the film). Maureen Stapleton played his mother Frances and Michael Dolan appeared as Scott Thorson. This film used some of Liberace's stage furnishings, and it was candid about his homosexuality.
- Liberace: Live from Heaven, a play imagining the entertainer's heavenly "trial" following death, began on stage in early 2010. The show featured the voices of Bobby Crush as Liberace, Stephen Fry as Saint Peter, and Victoria Wood as God.
- Behind the Candelabra, a film adaptation of Scott Thorson's autobiography, debuted on HBO in May 2013. Michael Douglas stars as Liberace, with Matt Damon playing Thorson, in a story centered on the relationship the two shared and its aftermath. His mother, Frances, was played by Debbie Reynolds, who had been a friend of Liberace's.
- The Jim Gaffigan Show, in 2016, licensed the likeness of Liberace as well as the use of a costume made for the HBO film Behind the Candelabra, from the Liberace Foundation, for an episode of the series which featured Michael Ian Black as Liberace.
- Blade Runner 2049, the 2017 sequel to the 1982 cult classic Blade Runner (both produced by Ridley Scott), licensed the likeness and music of Liberace for an appearance in the film which takes place in a dystopian Las Vegas, alongside fellow icons Elvis Presley, Frank Sinatra and Marilyn Monroe.
- I'll Be Seeing You, a new play written by Martin Sherman about a young writer who is visited by an apparition of Liberace whilst he is forced to write a play about him, debuted in 2026 as part of Alan Cumming's inaugural season at Pitlochry Festival Theatre, starring Simon Russell Beale and Fra Fee, and directed by Alan Cumming and Ben Occhipinti

== Legacy ==
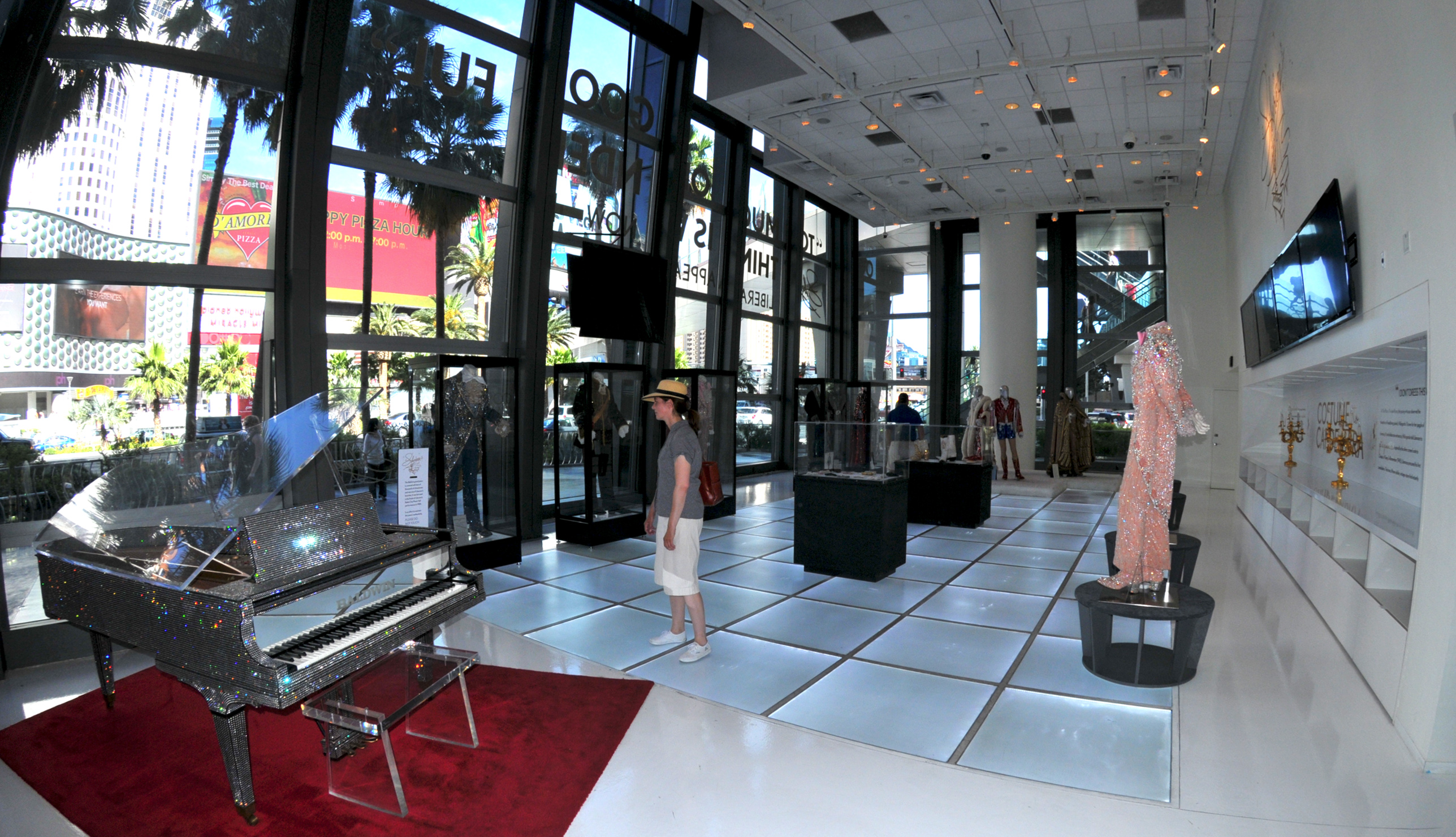
A Liberace pop-up exhibition at the Cosmopolitan Las Vegas

At the time of his death Liberace was said to be worth around $110 million and to have bequeathed $88 million to the Liberace Foundation.

== Selected discography ==
Studio albums

- Liberace at the Piano (1952)

== Publications ==
=== Autobiographies ===
- Liberace: An Autobiography, by Liberace. Putnam and Co. Ltd, New York, 1973 ISBN 978-0399112294 (hardcover)
- The Things I Love, by Liberace with Tony Palmer (editor). Grosset & Dunlap, New York, 1976 ISBN 978-0448127187 (hardcover)
- The Wonderful Private World of Liberace, by Liberace and Michael Segell. Harper and Row, New York, 1986 ISBN 978-0060154813 (hardcover)

=== Biographies ===
- Crying All the Way to the Bank by Revel Barker (Famous Trials) 2009 ISBN 978-0955823879
- The Liberace Story by Chester Whitehorn (editor), Screen Publications Inc, New York, 1955 (softcover – No. 4 in the Candid Profile series)
- Liberace: On Stage and Off by Anthony Monahan, GRT Music Productions, Sunnyvale California, 1976 (hardcover)
- Liberace: The True Story by Bob Thomas, St. Martin's Press, New York, 1987 (hardcover)
- Behind the Candelabra: My Life with Liberace by Scott Thorson with Alex Thorleifson, E.P. Dutton, New York, 1988 (hardcover)
- Liberace: A Bio-Bibliography by Jocelyn Faris, Greenwood Press, Westport Connecticut, 1995
- Liberace: An American Boy by Darden Asbury Pyron, University of Chicago Press, 2000, (hardcover) Read an excerpt.
- Liberace (Lives of Notable Gay Men and Lesbians) by Ray Mungo and Martin B. Duberman, Chelsea House Publications

=== Cooking ===
- Liberace Cooks by Carol Truax, Doubleday, New York, 1970 (hardcover)
- Cookbook of the Stars, Motion Picture Mothers, Hollywood, 1970
- Joy of Liberace: Retro Recipes from America's Kitchiest Kitchen by Michael Feder and Karan Feder, Angel City Press, 2007 (hardcover)
- Delicious Recipes from Liberace's #1 Cook by Gladys Luckie

=== Compilations ===
- The First Time: 28 Celebrities Tell About Their First Sexual Experiences by Karl Fleming and Anne Taylor Fleming, Berkley Medallion, 1976 (paperback)
- Liberace Christmas Music: A Guide to Cassettes, Compact Discs, Music Scores, Piano Rolls, and Sound Recordings by Karl B. Johnson, John Carlson Press
- The Liberace Collection, auction catalogue, jointly produced by Butterfield & Butterfield and Christie's, Los Angeles Convention Centre, 1988
- Liberace: Your Personal Fashion Consultant by Michael Feder and Karan Feder, Abrams Image, 2007 (paperback)
- "Liberace Extravaganza!" by costume designers Connie Furr Soloman and Jan Jewett, HarperCollins, 2013 (hardcover)

== Bibliography ==
- Pyron, Darden Asbury (2000). Liberace: An American Boy. University of Chicago Press. ISBN 978-0-226-68669-1.
