= The Merry Widow (soundtrack) =

Soundtrack album by Fernando Lamas
- Released: 1952
- Label: MGM

Selections from the original soundtrack to the 1952 Metro-Goldwyn-Mayer film The Merry Widow were released by MGM Records in the same year. The album was credited to Fernando Lamas on its cover and to an "original cast" on Billboard's charts.

== Writing and recording ==
The English lyrics were provided by Paul Francis Webster.

The album was recorded with MGM Studio Orchestra and Chorus conducted by Jay Blackton (who also arranged the music).

== Release ==
The album was released in several formats: as a set of four 10-inch 78-rpm phonograph records (cat. no. 157), a set of 7-inch 45-rpm records (cat. no. K157) and as a 10-inch LP (cat. no. E157).

== Reception ==
The album spent several weeks at number one on the 33⅓-rpm half of Billboard's Best-Selling Pop Albums chart in October–November 1952.

== Track listing ==
10-inch LP (MGM Records E157)

Side 1
No.	Title	Writer(s)	Artist(s)	Length
1.	"Merry Widow Waltz—Part 1"	Lehar—Arr. Blackton	M-G-M Studio Orchestra and Chorus
2.	"Merry Widow Waltz—Part 2"	Lehar—Arr. Blackton–Webster	M-G-M Studio Orchestra and Chorus
3.	"Maxim's"	Lehar—Arr. Blackton–Webster	Fernando Lamas with an assist by Richard Haydn
4.	"Vilia"	Lehar–Webster	Fernando Lamas

Side 2
No.	Title	Writer(s)	Artist(s)	Length
1.	"Girls, Girls, Girls"	Lehar–Webster	M-G-M Studio Chorus with Fernando Lamas
2.	"Merry Widow Waltz"	Lehar–Webster	Fernando Lamas and Trudy Erwin
3.	"Night"	Lehar–Webster	Fernando Lamas
4.	"Gypsy Music" "Can Can"	Lehar–Blackton; Lehar—Arr. Blackton	M-G-M Studio Orchestra and Chorus

== Charts ==
Chart (1952)	Peak position
US Billboard Best Selling Pop Albums – Best Selling 33⅓ R.P.M.	1
