= An American in Paris (soundtrack) =

Soundtrack album by Gene Kelly
- Released: 31 September 1951
- Label: MGM

Professional ratings
Review scores
Source	Rating
Billboard	88/100
AllMusic	4.5/5 stars
AllMusic	(reissue, 2-CD set)

The original soundtrack to the 1951 film An American in Paris was released by MGM Records in three formats: as a set of four 10-inch 78-rpm phonograph records, as a set of four 7-inch EPs, and as a 10-inch long-play record. It contained songs sung by Gene Kelly and Georges Guétary and "An American in Paris" ballet music performed by Johnny Green and the MGM Studio Orchestra.

For the 78-rpm and EP formats, the ballet was divided into four sides.

Billboard reviewed the album in its issue from 6 October 1951, giving it 88 points out of 100 (which indicated an "excellent" rating) and writing: "Highlight of the set, as it is of the movie, is Gershwin's 'An American in Paris' set for a ballet. On the record, it is done in an abortive arrangement by Saul Chaplin. The general public will probably not know or worry about it but the connosieurs will certainly shudder at this treatment. What's left of it is played with broad humor, which it demands, and spirit, tho without subtlety. The remaining selections are done with style and grace by stars Gene Kelly and Georges Guetary. Songs, of course, are great Gershwin."

The album spent several weeks at number 1 on the 33⅓ R.P.M. half of the Billboard's Best Selling Pop Albums chart.

== Track listing ==
10-inch long-play record (MGM Records E-93)

Side 1
No.	Title	Artist(s)	Length
1.	"'S Wonderful"	Gene Kelly and Georges Guétary
2.	"Love Is Here to Stay"	Gene Kelly
3.	"I'll Build a Stairway to Paradise"	Georges Guétary
4.	"I Got Rhythm"	Gene Kelly

Side 2
No.	Title	Artist(s)	Length
1.	"An American in Paris Ballet"	Johnny Green and the MGM Studio Orchestra

== Charts ==
Chart (1952)	Peak position
US Billboard Best Selling Pop Albums – Best Selling 33⅓ R.P.M.	1
