= With a Song in My Heart (Jane Froman album) =

Studio album by Jane Froman
- Released: 1952
- Label: Capitol

Jane Froman chronology
With a Song in My Heart (1952)	Yours Alone (1953)

With a Song in My Heart... is a 1952 album by Jane Froman featuring songs from that year's 20th Century-Fox film With a Song in My Heart based on her life story. The album was released by Capitol Records.

== Background ==
With a Song in My Heart / Pal Joey (2003 CD)
Review scores
Source	Rating
AllMusic	4/5 stars

With a Song in My Heart / Yours Alone (2000 CD)
Review scores
Source	Rating
AllMusic	3/5 stars

According to Billboard, in 1951, Jane Froman was "wisely" signed by Capitol Records "to a recording contract" "on the strength of anticipated public interest in her" that would follow release of the 20th Century-Fox musical film based on her biography.

"Performed with warmth and fervor, her glorious voice was never more beautiful ... a singing symbol of her resplendent life. Another Capitol Exclusive!," said a Capitol advertisement in the magazine.

The album spent numerous weeks at number one on Billboard's Best-Selling Pop Albums chart – on both the 33⅓-rpm and 45-rpm halves of it.

In February 1953, Billboard noted that the album had become "one of the biggest sellers ever released" by Capitol.

In a retrospective review in his 2014 book Just Remember This, Colin Bratkovich commended the song "With a Song in My Heart" as recorded by Froman for this album, noting that her "vocal approach is much the same as by Hildegarde in 1939", but added: "Beware of the rest of this soundtrack despite its contemporary 'best seller' credentials!"

== Track listing ==
10-inch LP (Capitol L 309)
No.	Title	Writer(s)	Length
1.	"Opening production" and "It's a Good Day"	Dave Barbour—Peggy Lee
2.	"Tea for Two"	Vincent Youmans—Irving Caesar
3.	"Blue Moon"	Richard Rodgers—Lorenz Hart
4.	"Embraceable You"	George Gershwin—Ira Gershwin
5.	"Get Happy"	Harold Arlen—Ted Koehler
6.	"I'll Walk Alone" and "They're Either Too Young or Too Old"	Sammy Cahn—Jule Styne; Arthur Schwartz—Frank Loesser
7.	"An American Medley" and "With a Song in My Heart"	Richard Rodgers—Lorenz Hart

== Charts ==
Chart (1952)	Peak position
US Billboard Best-Selling Pop Albums – Best Selling 33⅓ R.P.M.	1
US Billboard Best-Selling Pop Albums – Best Selling 45 R.P.M.	1
