= List of Jo Stafford compilation albums (2000–2009) =

The following is a list of compilation albums of songs recorded by U.S. singer Jo Stafford that were released between 2000 and 2009. They include material from her solo career, and recordings she made with artists such as Gordon MacRae, as well as her foray into comedy with husband Paul Weston as New Jersey lounge act Jonathan and Darlene Edwards.

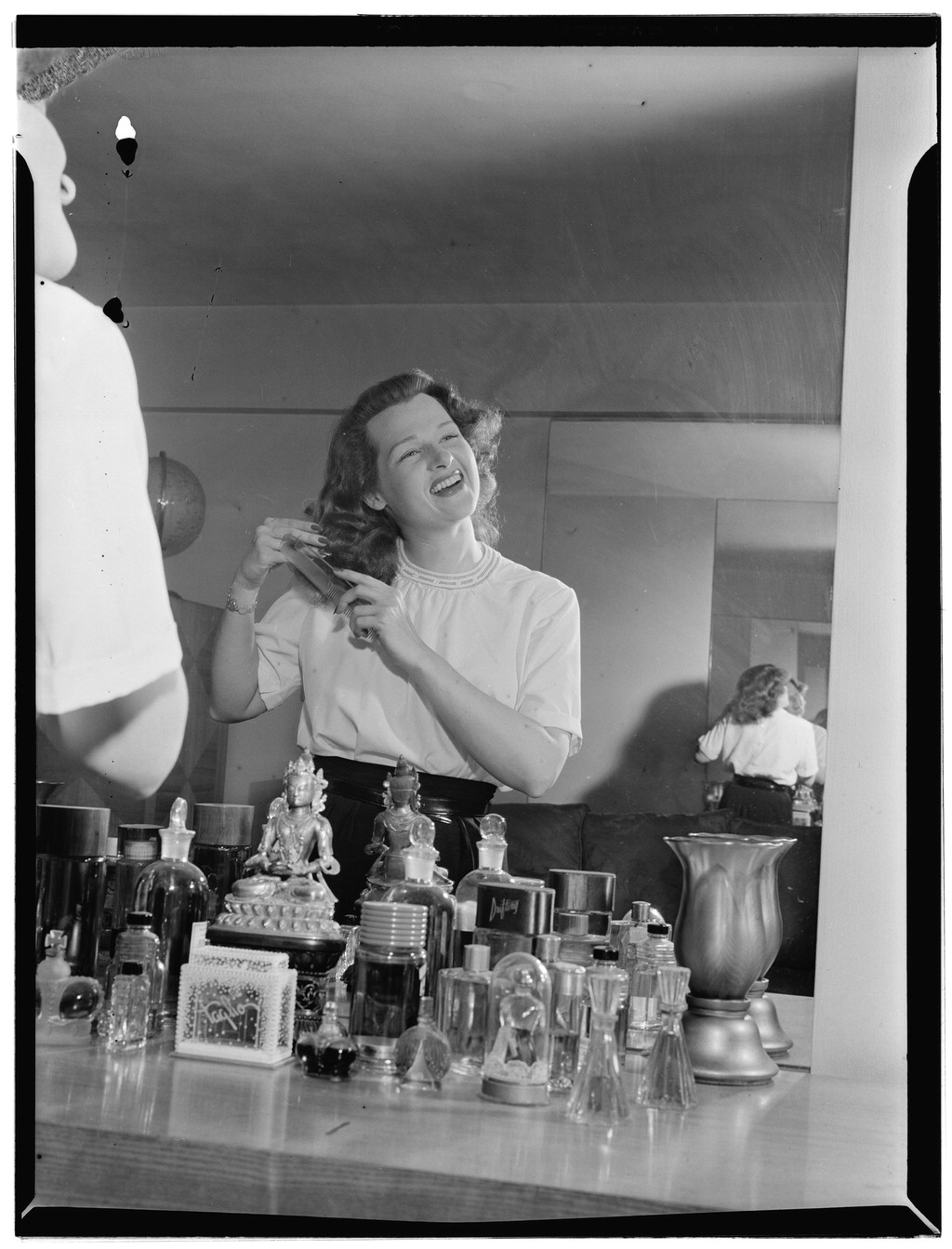
Jo Stafford, New York, July 1946

== Just Reminiscin' ==
Just Reminiscin' is a 2000 compilation album of songs recorded by American singer Jo Stafford. The album was released on January 1, 2000, in the United Kingdom on the Dutton Laboratories/Vocalion label.

== Jo & Friends ==
Jo & Friends is a 2000 compilation album of songs recorded by American singer Jo Stafford and various other artists. The friends who accompany her on this album include Nelson Eddy, Liberace and Vic Damone. It was released by Sony Music on their Sony Music Special Products label on January 1, 2000. A second album, titled Jo Stafford and Friends featuring the same tracks was released on October 30, 2007, on the Collectables Records label.

In 2008 the album was released as part of a three CD set along with Getting Sentimental over Tommy Dorsey and Best of Jo Stafford.

== The Columbia Hits Collection ==
The Columbia Hits Collection

Compilation album by Jo Stafford
- Released: January 1, 2001
- Genre: Traditional pop
- Label: Corinthian Records

Professional ratings
Review scores
Source	Rating
Allmusic	4.5/5 stars

The Columbia Hits Collection is a 2001 compilation album of songs recorded by American singer Jo Stafford. It was released by Corinthian Records on January 1, 2001.

Track listing
1 You Belong to Me
2 Make Love to Me
3 Keep It a Secret
4 Shrimp Boats
5 If
6 Jambalaya (On the Bayou)
7 Tennessee Waltz
8 Around the Corner
9 Hambone
10 Hey, Good Lookin'
11 In the Cool, Cool, Cool of the Evening
12 Pretty Eyed Baby
13 If You've Got the Money, I've Got the Time
14 It's Almost Tomorrow
15 Settin' the Woods on Fire
16 Somebody
17 Wind in the Willows
18 Suddenly There's a Valley
19 It's No Secret
20 (Now and Then There's) A Fool Such as I
21 Early Autumn
22 On London Bridge
23 Thank You for Calling
24 With a Little Bit of Luck
25 Gabriella (The Gamblin' Lady)
26 Kissin' Bug Boogie
27 Love Me Good
28 All Night Long
29 Teach Me Tonight

== Candy ==
Candy

Compilation album by Jo Stafford
- Released: January 1, 2001
- Genre: Traditional pop
- Label: Proper Sales & Distribution

Candy is a 2001 compilation album of songs recorded by American singer Jo Stafford. It was released by Proper Sales & Distribution on January 1, 2001.

Track listing
1 Tumbling Tumbleweeds
2 Conversation While Dancing
3 On the Sunny Side of the Street
4 Let's Take the Long Way Home
5 I'll Be Seeing You
6 Candy
7 There's No You
8 That's for Me
9 Symphony
10 Day by Day
11 The Boy Next Door
12 Over the Rainbow
13 Walkin' My Baby Back Home
14 Sometimes I'm Happy
15 Baby, Won't You Please Come Home
16 Ridin' on the Gravy Train
17 I'll Be With You In Apple Blossom Time
18 This Is Always
19 I've Never Forgotten
20 You Keep Coming Back Like a Song
21 The Things We Did Last Summer
22 Fools Rush In
23 A Sunday Kind of Love
24 Ivy
25 Temptation (Tim-Tayshun)

== Haunted Heart ==
Haunted Heart

Compilation album by Jo Stafford
- Released: January 1, 2001
- Genre: Traditional pop
- Label: X5 Music Group

Haunted Heart is a 2001 compilation album of songs recorded by American singer Jo Stafford. It was released by the X5 Music Group on January 1, 2001.

Track listing
1 Almost Like Being in Love
2 Smoke Dreams
3 I'm So Right Tonight
4 Love and the Weather
5 Feudin' and a Fightin'
6 When You Got a Man on Your Mind
7 The Stanley Steamer
8 Serenade of the Bells
9 The Gentleman Is a Dope
10 Sugar
11 Autumn in New York
12 He's Gone Away
13 The Best Things in Life Are Free
14 I Never Loved Anyone
15 Once and for Always
16 Roses of Picardy
17 Just One of Those Things
18 Through the Years
19 In the Still of the Night
20 Haunted Heart
21 Smoke Gets in Your Eyes
22 Better Luck Next Time
23 This Is the Moment
24 Congratulations
25 Make Believe

== 'A' You're Adorable ==
'A' You're Adorable

Compilation album by Jo Stafford
- Released: January 1, 2001
- Genre: Traditional pop
- Label: X5 Music Group

Jo Stafford chronology
Haunted Heart (2001)	'A' You're Adorable (2001)	International Hitst (2001)

'A' You're Adorable is a 2001 compilation album of songs recorded by American singer Jo Stafford. It was released by the X5 Music Group on January 1, 2001.

Track listing
1 If I Loved You
2 Suspicion
3 Clabberin' up for Rain
4 Trouble in Mind
5 By the Way
6 My Darling, My Darling
7 Just Reminiscin'
8 On the Alamo
9 Always True to You in My Fashion
10 'A' You're Adorable (The Alphabet Song)
11 Why Can't You Behave?
12 Some Enchanted Evening
13 Whispering Hope
14 The Last Mile Home
15 Ragtime Cowboy Joe
16 If I Ever Love Again
17 Red River Valley
18 Scarlet Ribbons (For Her Hair)
19 It's Great to Be Alive
20 Diamonds Are a Girl's Best Friend
21 When April Comes Again
22 Simple Melody
23 No Other Love
24 Autumn Leaves
25 La Vie en Rose

== International Hits ==
International Hits is a 2001 compilation album of songs recorded by American singer Jo Stafford. It was released on January 1, 2001, by Corinthian Records, the company founded by Stafford and her husband Paul Weston.

== Cocktail Hour ==
Cocktail Hour

Compilation album by Jo Stafford
- Released: January 9, 2001
- Genre: Traditional pop
- Label: Columbia River Entertainment Group

Professional ratings
Review scores
Source	Rating
Allmusic	1.5/5 stars

Cocktail Hour is a 2001 compilation album of songs recorded by American singer Jo Stafford. It was released on January 9, 2001 by the Columbia River Entertainment Group.

Track listing
1 The Trolley Song
2 Long Ago (and Far Away)
3 Let's Just Pretend
4 You Took My Love
5 It Could Happen to You
6 I'll Be Seeing You
7 Who Can I Turn To?
8 Blue Moon
9 I Love You
10 Manhattan Serenade
11 It Isn't a Dream Anymore
12 This Is Always
13 Blues in the Night
14 In the Still of the Night
15 Little Man With a Candy Cigar
16 The Things We Did Last Summer
17 Too Marvelous for Words
18 Embraceable You
19 Candy
20 What Is This Thing Called Love?
21 I Remember You
22 The Night We Called It a Day
23 Day by Day
24 For You
25 Yes, Indeed!
26 Baby, Won't You Please Come Home
27 What'cha Know Joe?
28 Sugar

== The Magic of Jo Stafford ==
The Magic of Jo Stafford

Compilation album by Jo Stafford
- Released: March 13, 2001
- Genre: Traditional pop
- Label: EMI Gold; Music for Pleasure (United Kingdom)

The Magic of Jo Stafford is a 2001 compilation album of songs recorded by American singer Jo Stafford. It was released on March 13, 2001 on the EMI Gold label. In the United Kingdom this album was released by Music for Pleasure.

Track listing
1 The Best Things in Life Are Free
2 On the Sunny Side of the Street
3 Play a Simple Melody
4 I'll Be With You In Apple Blossom Time
5 Let's Take the Long Way Home
6 You Belong to Me
7 Shrimp Boats
8 Jambalaya (On the Bayou)
9 Diamonds Are a Girl's Best Friend
10 Ragtime Cowboy Joe
11 Stanley Steamer
12 Georgia on My Mind
13 Too Marvelous for Words
14 Some Enchanted Evening
15 In the Still of the Night
16 Fools Rush In
17 La Vie en Rose
18 The Trolley Song
19 Over the Rainbow
20 Autumn Leaves

== Jo Stafford on Capitol ==
Jo Stafford on Capitol is a 2001 compilation album of songs recorded by American singer Jo Stafford. It was released on the Collectors' Choice label on June 12, 2001.

== Old Rugged Cross ==
Old Rugged Cross

Compilation album by Jo Stafford and Gordon Macrae
- Released: July 9, 2001
- Genre: Traditional pop Inspirational music
- Label: EMI

Professional ratings
Review scores
Source	Rating
Allmusic	3/5 stars

Old Rugged Cross is a 2001 compilation album of inspirational songs recorded by American singer Jo Stafford and singer and actor Gordon Macrae. Originally released by EMI Records on July 9, 2001, it was re-released in 2011.

Track listing
1 Whispering Hope
2 Abide With Me
3 In the Garden
4 Beyond the Sunset
5 Beautiful Isle of Somewhere
6 It Is No Secret
7 I Found a Friend
8 Old Rugged Cross
9 Rock of Ages
10 Star of Hope (Based on a Theme by Emile Waldte)
11 Now the Day Is Over
12 Perfect Day
13 He Bought My Soul at Calvary
14 Somebody Bigger Than You & I
15 All Through the Night
16 I May Never Pass This Way Again
17 You'll Never Walk Alone
18 Nearer My God to Thee
19 Lord Is My Shepherd
20 Peace in the Valley

== Best of the War Years ==
Best of the War Years

Compilation album by Jo Stafford
- Released: July 10, 2001
- Genre: Traditional pop
- Label: Stardust Records

Professional ratings
Review scores
Source	Rating
Allmusic	3/5 stars

Best of the War Years is a 2001 compilation album of songs recorded by American singer Jo Stafford. It was released by Stardust Records on July 10, 2001, and features tracks she recorded during the Second World War.

Track listing
1 Manhattan Serenade
2 Haunted Heart
3 Gee, It's Good to Hold You
4 When Our Hearts Were Young and Gay
5 Baby, Won't You Please Come Home
6 Alone Together
7 I'm So Right Tonight
8 I Didn't Know About You
9 Carry Me Back to Old Virginny
10 When the Red, Red Robin Comes Bob, Bob, Bobbin' Along
11 Yes, Indeed!
12 Tumbling Tumbleweeds
13 Bakery Blues
14 For You
15 That's for Me
16 I'll Be Seeing You
17 I Remember You
18 Yesterdays
19 Blue Moon
20 Tallahassee

== Platinum Collection ==
Platinum Collection

Compilation album by Jo Stafford
- Released: July 2, 2001
- Genre: Traditional pop
- Label: Start

Platinum Collection is a 2001 compilation album of songs recorded by American singer Jo Stafford. It was released on the Start label on July 2, 2001.

Track listing
1 I Should Care
2 Embraceable You
3 Keep It a Secret
4 If
5 Long Ago and Far Away
6 For You
7 Too Marvellous for Words
8 Come Rain or Come Shine
9 Blue Moon
10 I'll Be Seeing You
11 The Things We Did Last Summer
12 Stardust
13 What Is This Thing Called Love
14 On London Bridge
15 Little Man with the Candy Cigar
16 Every Night When the Sun Goes In
17 Ay-Round the Corner
18 Jambalaya
19 Shrimp Boats
20 It Could Happen to Me
21 I Remember You
22 You Belong to Me
23 Allentown Jail
24 Manhattan Serenade
25 Baby Won't You Please Come Home
26 St. Louis Blues
27 Day by Day
28 As I Love You
29 Make Love to Me
30 Whispering Hope
31 Blues in the Night
32 Let's Just Pretend
33 Who Can I Turn To?
34 Teach Me Tonight
35 Thank You for Calling, Goodbye
36 Hawaiian War Chant
37 If You've Got the Money, I've Got the Time
38 Tennessee Waltz
39 It's No Secret
40 Amor

== The Two of Us ==
The Two of Us

Compilation album by Jo Stafford and Gordon Macrae
- Released: September 18, 2001
- Genre: Traditional pop
- Label: The Empress Recording Company

Professional ratings
Review scores
Source	Rating
Allmusic	2.5/5 stars

The Two of Us is a 2001 compilation album of songs recorded by American singer Jo Stafford and actor and singer Gordon Macrae. It was released by the Empress Recording Company on September 18, 2001.

Track listing
1 The Best Things in Life Are Free
2 Spring in December
3 Autumn Leaves
4 Down the Lane
5 On the Alamo
6 Bibbidi Bobbidi Boo
7 A Chapter in My Life Called Mary
8 Better Luck Next Time
9 I Still Get Jealous
10 Dearie
11 "A" You're Adorable (The Alphabet Song)
12 Need You
13 Ragtime Cowboy Joe
14 Begin the Beguine
15 Say Something Sweet to Your Sweetheart
16 Just One of Those Things
17 Ting-A-Ling
18 Congratulations
19 Symphony
20 Jolly Jo
21 The Little Old Church Near Leicester Square
22 On the Outgoing Tide
23 Bluebird of Happiness
24 Smiles
25 The Melancholy Minstrel

== Yes Indeed! ==
Yes Indeed!

Compilation album by Jo Stafford
- Released: April 8, 2002
- Genre: Traditional pop
- Label: Proper Records

Professional ratings
Review scores
Source	Rating
Allmusic	3/5 stars

Yes Indeed is a 2002 compilation album box set of four discs featuring songs recorded by American singer Jo Stafford. It was released in the United Kingdom by Proper Records on April 8, 2002.

Track listing
Disc One - For You
1 What Can I Say After I Say I'm Sorry
2 Little Man With a Candy Cigar
3 For You
4 Yes Indeed!
5 Swingin' on Nothin'
6 Let's Just Pretend
7 Who Can I Turn to?
8 It Isn't a Dream Any More
9 Embraceable You
10 Blues in the Night
11 The Night We Called It a Day
12 Manhattan Serenade
13 You Can Depend on Me
14 Old Acquaintance
15 How Sweet You Are
16 Too Marvellous For Words
17 I Remember You
18 It Could Happen to You
19 Long Ago and Far Away
20 I Love You
21 The Trolley Song
22 Amor, Amor
23 The Day After Forever
24 I Didn't Know About You
Disc Two - Candy
1 Tumbling Tumbleweeds
2 Conversation While Dancing
3 On the Sunny Side of the Street
4 Let's Take the Long Way Home
5 I'll Be Seeing You
6 Candy
7 There's No You
8 That's For Me
9 Symphony
10 Day by Day
11 The Boy Next Door
12 Over the Rainbow
13 Walkin' My Baby Back Home
14 Sometimes I'm Happy
15 Baby, Won't You Please Come Home
16 Ridin' on the Gravy Train
17 I'll Be With You In Apple Blossom Time
18 This Is Always
19 I've Never Forgotten
20 You Keep Coming Back Like a Song
21 The Things We Did Last Summer
22 Fools Rush In
23 A Sunday Link of Love
24 Ivy
25 Temptation, (Tim-Tau Shun)
Disc Three - Haunted Heart
1 Almost Like Being in Love
2 Smoke Dreams
3 I'm So Right Tonight
4 Love and the Weather
5 Feudin' and Fightin'
6 When You Got a Man on Your Mind
7 The Stanley Steamer
8 Serenade of the Bells
9 The Gentleman Is a Dope
10 Sugar (That Sugar Baby O'Mine)
11 Autumn in New York
12 He's Gone Away
13 The Best Things in Life Are Free
14 I Never Loved Anyone
15 Once and For Always
16 Roses of Picardy
17 Just One of Those Things
18 Through the Years
19 In the Still of the Night
20 Haunted Heart
21 Smoke Gets in Your Eyes
22 Better Luck Next Time
23 This Is the Moment
24 Congratulations
25 Make Believe
Disc Four - 'A' You're Adorable
1 If I Loved You
2 Suspicion
3 Clabberin' up For Rain
4 Trouble in Mind
5 By the Way
6 My Darling, My Darling
7 Just Reminiscin'
8 On the Alamo
9 Always True to You in My Fashion
10 'A' You're Adorable
11 Why Can't You Behave?
12 Some Enchanted Evening
13 Whispering Hope
14 The Last Mile Home
15 Ragtime Cowboy Joe
16 If I Ever Love Again
17 Red River Valley
18 Scarlet Ribbons
19 It's Great to Be Alive
20 Diamonds Are a Girl's Best Friend
21 When April Comes Again
22 Simple Melody, (Play A)
23 No Other Love
24 Autumn Leaves
25 La Vie En Rose

== I Remember You ==
I Remember You

Compilation album by Jo Stafford
- Released: July 23, 2002
- Genre: Traditional pop
- Label: Fabulous

I Remember You is a 2002 compilation album of songs recorded by American singer Jo Stafford. It was released on the Fabulous label on July 23, 2002.

Track listing
1 Embraceable You
2 Let's Just Pretend
3 Manhattan Serenade
4 Yes, Indeed!
5 You Took My Love
6 Little Man With a Candy Cigar
7 The Night We Called It a Day
8 Blues in the Night
9 Too Marvelous for Words
10 I Remember You
11 Long Ago (and Far Away)
12 I Love You
13 It Could Happen to You
14 The Trolley Song
15 Candy
16 Day by Day
17 The Things We Did Last Summer
18 This Is Always

== The Ultimate ==
The Ultimate

Compilation album by Jo Stafford
- Released: August 27, 2002
- Genre: Traditional pop
- Label: EMI Music Distribution

Professional ratings
Review scores
Source	Rating
Allmusic	3/5 stars

The Ultimate is a 2002 compilation album of songs recorded by American singer Jo Stafford. It was released by EMI Music Distribution on August 27, 2002.

Track listing
1 Play a Simple Melody
2 The Best Things in Life Are Free
3 On the Sunny Side of the Street
4 I'll Be With You In Apple Blossom Time
5 Diamonds Are a Girl's Best Friend
6 Jambalaya (On the Bayou)
7 Georgia on My Mind
8 The Trolley Song
9 Too Marvelous for Words
10 You Belong to Me
11 Shrimp Boats
12 Let's Take the Long Way Home
13 In the Still of the Night
14 Some Enchanted Evening
15 Fools Rush In
16 La Vie en Rose
17 Over the Rainbow
18 Autumn Leaves
19 Ragtime Cowboy Joe
20 I Remember You
21 Smoke Gets in Your Eyes
22 Scarlet Ribbons (For Her Hair)
23 No Other Love
24 Red River Valley

== The Best of Jo Stafford ==
The Best of Jo Stafford

Compilation album by Jo Stafford
- Released: April 1, 2003
- Genre: Traditional pop
- Label: CEMA Special Markets

Professional ratings
Review scores
Source	Rating
Allmusic	3/5 stars

The Best of Jo Stafford is a 2003 compilation album of songs recorded by American singer Jo Stafford. The album was released by CEMA Special Markets on April 1, 2003. An album of the same name with the same tracks was also released on the Collectables label on the same date as the CEMA Special Markets edition.

In 2008 the album was re-released as part of a three CD set along with the titles Getting Sentimental over Tommy Dorsey and Jo Stafford and Friends.

Track listing
1 The Trolley Song
2 Some Enchanted Evening
3 My Darling, My Darling
4 Scarlet Ribbons (For Her Hair)
5 Serenade of the Bells
6 "A" You're Adorable (The Alphabet Song)
7 The Things We Did Last Summer
8 Candy
9 That's for Me
10 Feudin' and a Fightin'

== Meet Jo Stafford ==
Meet Jo Stafford

Compilation album by Jo Stafford
- Released: April 29, 2003
- Genre: Traditional pop
- Label: Sepia Records

Meet Jo Stafford is a 2003 compilation album of songs recorded by American singer Jo Stafford. It was released by Sepia Records on April 29, 2003.

Track listing
1 The Handsome Stranger
2 Use Your Imagination
3 Where, Oh Where
4 You Don't Remind Me
5 Tennessee Waltz
6 My Heart Cries for You
7 Lovely Is the Evening
8 San Antonio Rose
9 Till We Meet Again
10 When I Grow Too Old to Dream
11 Along the Colorado Trail
12 Allentown Jail
13 Star of Hope
14 Shrimp Boats
15 Hawaiian War Chant
16 Easy Come, Easy Go
17 Raminay! (The New Orleans Chimney Sweep)
18 Within Your Arms (Dans Ses Bras)
19 There's a Small Hotel
20 The Moment I Saw You
21 Pretty Boy (Pretty Girl)
22 You Belong to Me
23 Jambalaya (On the Bayou)
24 Keep It a Secret
25 Once to Every Heart

== The Columbia Singles Collection, Vol. 1 ==
The Columbia Singles Collection, Vol. 1 is a compilation album of songs recorded by American singer Jo Stafford during her time at Columbia Records. This album was released by Corinthian Records, the company founded by Stafford and her husband, Paul Weston, on February 17, 2004.

== You Belong to Me ==
You Belong to Me is a 2004 compilation album of songs recorded by American singer Jo Stafford. It is one of many Stafford compilations to have been released in the early 2000s under the title You Belong to Me, the name derived from the song of the same name, which became one of her best known hits during the 1950s. This album was released on June 29, 2004 and appears on the Memoir label.

== You Belong to Me ==
You Belong to Me is a 2004 compilation album of songs recorded by American singer Jo Stafford. It is one of many Stafford compilations to have been released in the early 2000s under the title You Belong to Me, the name derived from the song of the same name which became one of her best known hits during the 1950s. This album was released on June 29, 2004 by Remember Records.

== You Belong to Me ==
You Belong to Me is a 2004 compilation album of songs recorded by American singer Jo Stafford. It is one of many Stafford compilations to have been released in the early 2000s under the title You Belong to Me, the name derived from the song of the same name which became one of her best known hits during the 1950s. This album was released on June 29, 2004 by Rajon Entertainment Pty Ltd.

== You Belong to Me ==
You Belong to Me is a 2004 compilation album of songs recorded by American singer Jo Stafford. It is one of many Stafford compilations to have been released in the early 2000s under the title You Belong to Me, the name derived from the song of the same name which became one of her best known hits during the 1950s. This album was released on June 29, 2004 and appears on the ASV and Living Era labels.

== Stars of the Summer Night ==
Stars of the Summer Night

Compilation album by Jo Stafford and Gordon Macrae
- Released: July 13, 2004
- Genre: Traditional pop
- Label: Sepia Records

Stars of the Summer Night is a 2004 compilation album of songs recorded by American singer Jo Stafford and actor/singer Gordon Macrae. It was released on the Sepia label on July 13, 2004.

Track listing
1 Driftin' Down the Dreamy Ol' Ohio
2 Yesterdays
3 Body and Soul
4 Last Night
5 You May Not Love Me
6 Ramona
7 Long, Long Ago
8 It's as Simple as That
9 Do You Ever Think of Me
10 Stars of the Summer Night
11 Through a Thousand Dreams
12 Love Means Love
13 In the Gloaming
14 Give Me Something to Dream About
15 Wait for Me
16 Yesterday (Waltz Song)
17 The Nightingale
18 Ol' Man River
19 I'll See You After Church on Sunday Morning
20 Open Door, Open Arms
21 On a Sunday at Coney Island
22 I'm in the Middle of a Riddle
23 It Was So Beautiful
24 Cuddle Up a Little Closer
25 When It's Springtime in the Rockies
26 Love Is a Masquerade
27 No Other Girl for Me
28 Now the Day Is Over

== Over the Rainbow ==
Over the Rainbow

Compilation album by Jo Stafford
- Released: September 7, 2004
- Genre: Traditional pop
- Label: BCI

Over the Rainbow is a 2004 compilation album of songs recorded by American singer Jo Stafford. The album was released on the BCI label on September 7, 2004.

Track listing
1 Over the Rainbow
2 There's a Kind of Hush (All Over The World)
3 People
4 September in the Rain
5 I'll Be Seeing You
6 What the World Needs Now
7 Blue Moon
8 Stormy Weather
9 Try to Remember
10 Somewhere My Love
11 You Belong to Me
12 As Time Goes By

== Alone & Together ==
Alone & Together

Compilation album by Jo Stafford and Gordon Macrae
- Released: February 28, 2005
- Genre: Traditional pop
- Label: Castle Pulse

Alone & Together is a 2005 compilation album of songs recorded by American singer Jo Stafford and actor/singer Gordon Macrae. The album features both duets by Stafford and Macrae, as well as solo performances by both artists. It was released on February 28, 2005 on the Castle Pulse label.

Track listing
1 Whispering Hope
2 If I Loved You
3 Girls Were Made to Take Care of Boys
4 You Belong to Me
5 Bluebird of Happiness
6 Steppin' Out With My Baby
7 Wunderbar
8 Georgia on My Mind
9 Bibbidi Bobbidi Boo
10 Scarlet Ribbons (For Her Hair)
11 "A" You're Adorable (The Alphabet Song)
12 A Rosewood Spinet
13 Play a Simple Melody
14 Love's Old Sweet Song
15 Congratulations
16 Say Something Sweet to Your Sweetheart
17 When You've Got a Man on Your Mind
18 Evelyn
19 Goodnight Irene
20 Where Are You Going to Be When the Moon Shines
21 Dearie
22 The Pagan Love Song
23 The Melancholy Minstrel
24 No Other Love
25 Need You
26 Our Very Own
27 Ting-A-Ling
28 I'll String Along With You
29 The Best Things in Life Are Free
30 Funny Little Money Man
31 Down the Lane
33 I Hate Men
33 Little Old Church Near Leicester Square
34 Monday Tuesday Wednesday (I Love You)
35 Symphony
36 Tea for Two
37 Why Can't You Believe
38 Neapolitan Nights
39 Always True to You in My Fashion
40 To Think You've Chosen Me

== Memories Are Made of These ==
Memories Are Made of These

Compilation album by Jo Stafford
- Released: August 2, 2005
- Genre: Traditional pop
- Label: Essential Gold/Dynamic

Memories Are Made of These is a 2005 compilation album of songs recorded by American artist Jo Stafford. The album was released on August 2, 2005, and has appeared on the Essential Gold and Dynamic labels.

Track listing
1 Dear Hearts and Gentle People
2 You'd Be So Nice to Come Home To
3 Shoo-Fly Pie and Apple Pan Dowdy
4 I Hear a Rhapsody
5 Dearly Beloved
6 Lavender Blue (Dilly Dilly)
7 Far Away Places
8 Sweet Violets
9 I Don't Want to Walk Without You
10 Sleepy Lagoon
11 I'll Walk Alone
12 Blues in the Night
13 They Didn't Believe Me
14 My Heart Cries for You
15 The Nearness of You
16 Skylark
17 Together
18 Baby, It's Cold Outside
19 I Wish I Didn't Love You So
20 You Keep Coming Back Like a Song
21 Doin' What Comes Natur'lly
22 The Gypsy
23 (I Love You) For Sentimental Reasons
24 Buttons and Bows
25 Smoke Gets in Your Eyes
26 You Belong to Me
27 Jambalaya (On the Bayou)
28 Make Love to Me
29 Shrimp Boats
30 Teach Me Tonight
31 Candy
32 Feudin' and Fightin'
33 Some Enchanted Evening
34 No Other Love
35 Day by Day
36 Keep It a Secret
37 My Darling, My Darling
38 A-Round the Corner
39 It Is No Secret (What God Can Do)
40 Gambella
41 It Could Happen to You
42 That's for Me
43 Hambone
44 Hey, Good Lookin'
45 Symphony
46 In the Cool, Cool, Cool of the Evening
47 Early Autumn
48 Somebody
49 Serenade of the Bells
50 (Now and Then There's) A Fool Such as I
51 Hey There
52 Half as Much
53 This Ole House
54 Come On-A My House
55 Two Old to Cut the Mustard
56 Hello, Young Lovers
57 Who Kissed Me Last Night?
58 Tenderly
59 Botch-A-Me (Ba-Ba Baciami Piccina)
60 Count Your Blessings (Instead of Sheep)
61 Young at Heart
62 You're Just in Love
63 If Teardrops Were Pennies
64 It Might as Well Be Spring
65 Marrying for Love
66 Mambo Italiano
67 Mixed Emotions
68 You Make Me Feel So Young
69 When You Love Someone
70 Beautiful Brown Eyes
71 Be My Life's Companion
72 Over the Rainbow
73 You'll Never Know
74 Younger Than Springtime
75 When You Wish Upon a Star

== Love, Mystery and Adventure ==
Love, Mystery and Adventure

Compilation album by Jo Stafford
- Released: April 18, 2006
- Genre: Traditional pop
- Label: Jasmine Records

Love, Mystery and Adventure is a 2006 compilation album of songs recorded by American artist Jo Stafford. It was released by Jasmine Records on April 18, 2006.

Track listing
1 A Friend of Johnny's
2 Goodnight Pillow
3 Hey, Good Lookin'
4 Love, Mystery and Adventure
5 Make the Man Love Me
6 Heaven Drops Her Curtain Down
7 Something to Remember You By
8 September in the Rain
9 You Belong to Me
10 My Romance
11 All the Things You Are
12 Dancing in the Dark
13 September Song
14 Keep It a Secret
15 Without My Lover (Bolero Gaucho)
16 Just Because You're You
17 Smoking My Sad Cigarette
18 I'm Always Chasing Rainbows
19 When It's Sleepy Time Down South
20 (Now and Then There's) A Fool Such as I
21 A Bushel and a Peck
22 If I Were a Bell
23 Someone's Been Reading My Mail
24 Just Another Polka
25 My Dearest, My Darling
26 I Found a Friend
27 Beautiful Isle of Somewhere
28 Peace in the Valley
29 Cup of Joy
30 Living for Only You
31 Adi-Adios (Il Passerotto) Amigo
32 The Dixeland Band
33 Make Love to Me
34 April and You
35 Indiscreation
36 One Love Forever
37 Temple of an Understanding Heart
38 I Only Have Eyes for You
39 High Society
40 Teach Me Tonight
41 Suddenly
42 Darling, Darling, Darling
43 I Got a Sweetie
44 Please Don't Go So Soon
45 St. Louis Blues
46 Young and Foolish
47 Be Sure Beloved
48 My Heart Goes a Sailing
49 The Night Watch
50 Ain't-Cha-Cha Comin' out T-Tonight?
51 Suddenly There's a Valley
52 If You Want to Love
53 One Little Kiss
54 It's Almost Tomorrow
55 Arrivederci Darling

== Sincerely Yours ==
Sincerely Yours is a 2006 compilation album of songs recorded by American singer Jo Stafford. It was released on May 9, 2006 on the Sepia label.

The "Hollywood House Party" included on the album was a special release of Columbia Records in 1955. It was recorded at a party Stafford and husband Paul Weston gave at their home. Columbia had produced several new phonographs in 1955; part of their sales promotion for them was to give buyers of units valued at $100 or more the Columbia House Party album, which was not available any other way. One side of the album featured the party with celebrities at the Weston's California home, while the other featured Mitch Miller's New York City party. Those who attended the Weston's Hollywood house party and are heard on this album include Liberace, Dave Brubeck, and Frankie Laine.

== Vintage Years ==
Vintage Years

Compilation album by Jo Stafford
- Released: June 22, 2006
- Genre: Traditional pop
- Label: Red X

Vintage Years is a 2006 compilation album of songs recorded by American singer Jo Stafford. The album was released under the Red X label on June 22, 2006.

Track listing
1 On London Bridge
2 Jambalaya
3 Shrimp Boats
4 You Belong to Me
5 Keep It a Secret
6 Suddenly There's a Valley
7 Ay 'Round the Corner
8 If I Were a Bell
9 Young & Foolish
10 It's Almost Tomorrow
11 Lazy Moon
12 Underneath the Overpass
13 I May Never Pass This Way Again
14 Star of Love

== All Hits! ==
All Hits!

Compilation album by Jo Stafford
- Released: December 18, 2006
- Genre: Traditional pop
- Label: Golden Stars

All Hits! is a 2006 compilation album of songs recorded by Jo Stafford. The album was released on the Golden Stars label on 18 December 2006.

Track listing
1 Yes, Indeed!
2 I Love You
3 Long Ago (and Far Away)
4 It Could Happen To You
5 On the Sunny Side of the Street
6 Candy
7 There's No You
8 That's For Me
9 You Keep Coming Back Like a Song
10 Symphony
11 Day by Day
12 Temptation (Tim-Tayshun)
13 A Sunday Kind Of Love
14 Serenade of the Bells
15 Feudin' and Fightin'
16 The Gentleman Is A Dope
17 Haunted Heart
18 My Darling, My Darling
19 Congratulations
20 Once and For Always
21 "A" - You're Adorable
22 Some Enchanted Evening
23 Ragtime Cowboy Joe
24 Whispering Hope
25 No Other Love
26 If You've Got The Money, I've Got The Time
27 Scarlet Ribbons (For Her Hair)
28 Shrimp Boats
29 If
30 Tennessee Waltz
31 It Is No Secret (What God Can Do)
32 In the Cool, Cool, Cool of the Evening
33 Hey Good Lookin'
34 Somebody
35 Pretty Eyed Baby
36 You Belong to Me
37 Jambalaya
38 Ay-Round The Corner
39 Early Autumn
40 Hambone
41 (Tonight We're) Setting The Woods On Fire
42 Keep It a Secret
43 (Now And Then There's) A Fool Such As I
44 Make Love to Me
45 Thank You For Calling
46 Teach Me Tonight
47 Suddenly There's You
48 It's Almost Tomorrow

== Ultimate Capitol Collection ==
Ultimate Capitol Collection

Compilation album by Jo Stafford
- Released: June 4, 2007
- Genre: Traditional pop
- Label: EMI

Professional ratings
Review scores
Source	Rating
Allmusic	3.5/5 stars

Ultimate Capitol Collection is a 2007 compilation album of songs recorded by American singer Jo Stafford. The album was released on the EMI label on June 4, 2007.

Track listing
1 Old Acquaintance
2 Pistol Packin' Mama
3 I Didn't Know About You
4 Candy
5 My Darling, My Darling
6 Tim-Tay-Shun (Temptation)
7 Whispering Hope
8 Winter Wonderland
9 Almost Like Being in Love
10 Autumn Leaves
11 Suspicion
12 The Traveling Salesman Polka
13 Red River Valley
14 The Old Rugged Cross
15 These Will Be the Best Years of Our Lives
16 Love and the Weather
17 Love's Old Sweet Song
18 No Other Love
19 Haunted Heart
20 Alone Together
21 I'll Be Seeing You
22 I Wonder as I Wander
23 Poor Wayfaring Stranger
24 Scarlet Ribbons (For Her Hair)
25 Georgia on My Mind
26 The Boy Next Door
27 Make Believe
28 Carry Me Back to Old Virginny
29 Hold Me, Hold Me
30 It's Monday Every Day
31 Near Me
32 Sweet By and By
33 This Time
34 Oh, Holy Morning
35 A Perfect Day
36 Diamonds Are a Girl's Best Friend
37 Day by Day
38 Echoes
39 Feudin' and Fightin'
40 If I Loved You
41 In the Still of the Night
42 Nearer, My God, to Thee
43 Long Ago (and Far Away)
44 When It's Springtime in the Rockies
45 Roses of Picardy
46 Walkin' My Baby Back Home
47 Some Enchanted Evening
48 Adios My Love
49 If My Heart Had a Window
50 The Last Time I Saw You
51 Rockin' Chair
52 You Wear Love So Well
53 When Day Is Done

== Blues in the Night ==
Blues in the Night

Compilation album by Jo Stafford
- Released: October 30, 2007
- Genre: Traditional pop
- Label: PIO

Blues in the Night is a 2007 compilation album of songs recorded by American singer Jo Stafford. This collection, released on the PIO label in the United Kingdom, has 23 tracks. It was released on October 30, 2007.

Track listing
1 Little Man With A Candy Cigar
2 The Things We Did Last Summer
3 What Is This Thing Called Love?
4 I Remember You
5 Day By Day
6 This Is Always
7 I Love You
8 It Could Happen To You
9 Blues In The Night
10 The Night We Called It A Day
11 Candy
12 Embraceable You
13 Manhattan Serenade
14 For You
15 Baby, Won't You Please Come Home
16 Too Marvellous For Words
17 Yes, Indeed!
18 Long Ago (And Far Away)
19 Let's Just Pretend
20 I'll Be Seeing You
21 It Isn't A Dream Anymore
22 Who Can I Turn To?
23 What'cha Know, Joe?

== Her Greatest Hits ==
Her Greatest Hits is a 2008 compilation album of songs recorded by American artist Jo Stafford. This album, released by JSP on January 8, 2008, features over 100 of Stafford's recordings.

== You Belong to Me ==
You Belong to Me is a 2008 compilation album of songs by American artist Jo Stafford. Released on the Dynamic label on April 8, 2008, the album features 16 of Stafford's hits.

== The Capitol Rarities 1943-1950 ==
The Capitol Rarities 1943-1950 is a 2009 compilation album of songs recorded by American singer Jo Stafford. It was released on March 24, 2009, on the DRG label and is a collection of rare recordings from the earlier part of her career.

== Reflections: The Ultimate Collection ==
Reflections: The Ultimate Collection

Compilation album by Jo Stafford
- Released: July 14, 2009
- Genre: Traditional pop
- Label: Jasmine Records

Reflections: The Ultimate Collection is a 2009 compilation of recordings by Jo Stafford. The collection was released on the Jasmine label on July 14, 2009 as a 4-CD set.

Track listing
Disc one
1 You Belong to Me
2 Keep It a Secret
3 Nearer My Love to Me
4 Smilin Through
5 Goodnight Irene
6 I'll String Along with You
7 Whispering Hope
8 If It Takes Me All My Life
9 The Christmas Blues
10 Blue Skies
11 Within Your Arms
12 If
13Ay-Round the Corner (Behind the Bush)
14 My Heart Cries for You
15 Teardrops From My Eyes
16 Where Are You?
17 Suddenly There's a Valley
18 When April Comes Again
19 Big D
20 With These Hands
21 Till We Meet Again
22 I Love You Truly
23 When I Grow Too Old to Dream
24 You Don't Remind Me
25 The Temple of An Understanding Heart
26 Spring Is Here
27 Don't Get Around Much Anymore
28 Darling! Darling! Darling!
Disc two
1 Poor Wayfaring Stranger
2 He's Gone Away
3 I Wonder As I Wander
4 Red Rosey Bush
5 Black Is the Color
6 The Nightingale
7 Barbara Allen
8 No Other Love
9 It Was So Beautiful (And You Were Mine)
10 It's Great to Be Alive
11 They Talk a Different Language (Yodel Blues)
12 Open Door Open Arms
13 Ask Me No Questions
14 Love Is a Masquerade
15 Sometime
16 Here I'll Stay
17 On the Outgoing Tide
18 White Christmas
19 Silent Night
20 Ave Maria
21 Abide with Me
22 Lead Kindly, Light
23 In the Garden
24 Nearer My God to Thee
25 Rock of Ages
26 Battle Hymn of the Republic
27 He Leadeth Me
28 The Old Rugged Cross
Disc three
1 Make Love to Me
2 When It's Sleepy Time Down South
3 Way Down Yonder in New Orleans
4 Raminay! (The New Orleans Chimney Sweep)
5 New Orleans
6 Jambalaya
7 Floatin' Down to Cotton Town
8 Do You Know What It Means to Miss New Orleans?
9 Shrimp Boats
10 Basin Street Blues
11 Hey, Good Lookin'
12 Gambella (The Gamblin Lady)
13 Early Autumn
14 What Good Am I Without You?
15 Thank You for Calling
16 I'm Your Girl
17 It Is No Secret
18 Star of Hope
19 He Bought My Soul At Calvary
20 I Found a Friend
21 Beautiful Isle of Somewhere
22 Invisible Hands
23 (There Will Be) Peace in the Valley
24 The Beautiful Garden of Prayer
25 The Lord Is My Shepherd
26 Each Step of the Way
27 It Is Springtime
28 Lord, Keep Your Hand On Me
Disc four
1 Pine Top's Boogie
2 Every Night When the Sun Goes In
3 Star of Love
4 My Heart Is From Missouri
5 Echoes in the Night
6 King of Paris
7 You're Starting to Get to Me
8 It's Never Quite the Same
9 It Won't Be Easy
10 Hibiscus
11 On London Bridge
12 All Night Long
13 Sweet Little Darlin'
14 How Can We Say Goodbye?
15 Wind in the Willow
16 I'll Buy It
17 With a Little Bit of Luck
18 Beyond the Stars
19 What's Botherin' You, Baby?
20 All Yours
21 Lazy Moon
22 Underneath the Overpass
23 Warm All Over
24 As I Love You
25 Love Me Good
26 A Perfect Love
27 I'll Be There (When You Get Lonely)
28 Bells Are Ringing
29 The Nightwatch
30 I May Never Pass This Way Again
