= List of Jo Stafford compilation albums (1955–1999) =

The following is a list of compilation albums of songs recorded by U.S. singer Jo Stafford that were released between 1955 and 1999. They include material from her solo career, and recordings she made with artists such as Gordon MacRae, as well as her foray into comedy with husband Paul Weston as New Jersey lounge act Jonathan and Darlene Edwards.

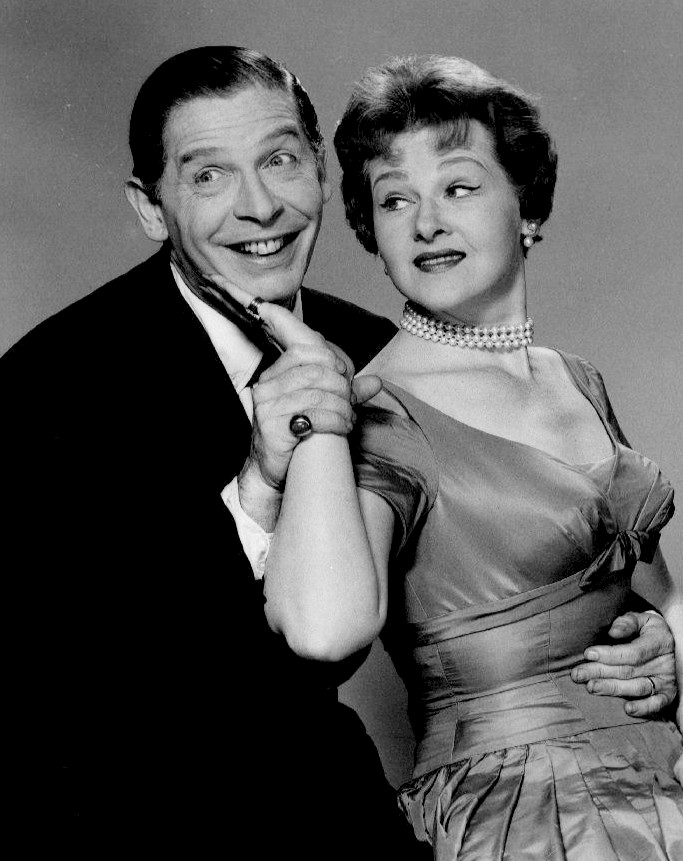
Jo Stafford and Milton Berle, Kraft Music Hall, 1959

== The Voice of Your Choice ==
The Voice of Your Choice

Compilation album by Jo Stafford
- Released: 1955
- Genre: Traditional pop
- Label: Philips Records

The Voice of Your Choice is a 1955 compilation album by Jo Stafford released by Philips Records.

Track listing
Side 1
1 All the Things You Are
2 My Romance
3 Dancing in the Dark
4 Night and Day
Side 2
5 (Now and Then, There's) A Fool Such As I
6 Just Because You're You
7 Cup of Joy
8 Without My Lover

== Sweet Singer of Songs ==
Sweet Singer of Songs

Compilation album by Jo Stafford
- Released: 1969
- Genre: Traditional pop
- Label: Vocalion/Decca Records

Sweet Singer of Songs is a compilation album by Jo Stafford on Vocalion/Decca Records released in 1969.

Track listing
Side 1
1 September in the Rain
2 It Could Happen to You
3 As I Love You
4 I Cover the Waterfront
5 Love For Sale
Side 2
6 Old Devil Moon
7 Teach Me Tonight
8 Don't Get Around Much Anymore
9 Night and Day
10 Blues in the Night

== Big Band Sound ==
Big Band Sound is a 1970 compilation album of standards by Jo Stafford. The songs were recorded between 1960 and 1970 and see Stafford backed by a number of big band arrangers, notably her husband Paul Weston, as well as Billy May and Benny Carter. The album was released on the Corinthian label.

== In the Mood for Love ==
In the Mood for Love

Compilation album by Jo Stafford
- Released: 1970
- Genre: Traditional pop
- Label: Vocalion Records

In the Mood for Love is a 1970 compilation album of songs by Jo Stafford. It was released in 1970 by Vocalion Records.

Track listing
Side 1
1 I'm in the Mood for Love
2 Blue Moon
3 Spring Is Here
4 Embraceable You
5 Love For Sale
Side 2
6 They Say It's Wonderful
7 Young and Foolish
8 Don't Worry 'Bout Me
9 I Fall in Love Too Easily
10 All the Things You Are

== Jo Stafford: By Request ==
Jo Stafford: By Request

Compilation album by Jo Stafford
- Released: 1982
- Genre: Traditional pop
- Label: Corinthian Records

Jo Stafford: By Request is a 1982 compilation album of recordings by Jo Stafford .

Track listing
1 As I Love You
2 Early Autumn
3 September In The Rain
4 I Cover The Waterfront
5 Don't Worry 'Bout Me
6 Blue Skies
7 Young and Foolish
8 Easy Come, Easy Go
9 When It's Sleepy Time Down South
10 Dancing On The Ceiling
11 If
12 The King Of Paris

== Broadway Revisited ==
Broadway Revisited

Compilation album by Jo Stafford
- Released: January 1, 1987
- Genre: Traditional pop
- Label: Corinthian

Broadway Revisited is a 1987 compilation album of recordings by Jo Stafford.

Track listing
1 My Romance
2 Something to Remember You By
3 It Never Entered My Mind
4 They Say It's Wonderful
5 I'm Always Chasing Rainbows
6 Make the Man Love Me
7 Happiness is a Thing Called Joe
8 Dancing in the Dark
9 September Song
10 Spring Is Here
11 If I Were a Bell
12 Mountain High, Valley Low
13 How High the Moon
14 I'm Your Girl
15 Night and Day

== G.I. Jo ==
G.I. Jo

Compilation album by Jo Stafford
- Released: January 1, 1987
- Genre: Traditional pop
- Label: Corinthian

G.I. Jo is a 1987 compilation album of recordings by Jo Stafford.

Track listing
1 I'll Walk Alone
2 I Left My Heart at the Stage Door Canteen
3 No Love, No Nothin'
4 We Mustn't Say Goodbye
5 You'll Never Know
5 I'll Remember April
6 It Could Happen to You
7 I Don't Want to Walk Without You
8 I Fall in Love Too Easily
9 I'll Be Seeing You

== Introducing Jo Stafford ==
Introducing Jo Stafford

Compilation album by Jo Stafford
- Released: 1987
- Genre: Traditional pop
- Label: Capitol/EMI

Introducing Jo Stafford is a compilation album by Jo Stafford featuring Paul Weston, The Starlighters, and The Pied Pipers on Capitol Records released in 1987.

Track listing
1 Begin the Beguine
2 Roses of Picardy
3 If I Ever Love Again
4 Congratulations
5 Why Can't You Behave?
6 Sometime
7 Always True to You in My Fashion
8 Scarlet Ribbons
9 Too Marvelous for Words
10 Over the Rainbow
11 Just Reminiscin'
12 Walkin' My Baby Back Home
13 I Remember You
14 Happy Times
15 Baby Won't You Please Come Home
16 Smoke Dreams

== You Belong to Me ==
You Belong to Me

Compilation album by Jo Stafford
- Released: January 1, 1989
- Genre: Traditional pop
- Label: Pair

Professional ratings
Review scores
| Source | Rating |
|---|---|
| Allmusic | 3/5 stars |

You Belong to Me is a 1989 compilation album of recordings by Jo Stafford.

Track listing
1 Long Ago (And Far Away)
2 Symphony
3 Some Enchanted Evening
4 If I Loved You
5 That's for Me
6 Serenade of the Bells
7 It Could Happen to You
8 You Belong to Me
9 I'll Be Seeing You
10 The Trolley Song
11 I Love You
12 Day by Day
13 Make Love to Me
14 No Other Love
15 Jambalaya (On the Bayou)
16 Shrimp Boats

== America's Most Versatile Singing Star ==
America's Most Versatile Singing Star

Compilation album by Jo Stafford
- Released: January 1, 1990
- Genre: Traditional pop
- Label: Corinthian

America's Most Versatile Singing Star is a 1990 compilation album of recordings by Jo Stafford.

Track listing
1 I'll Be Seeing You (Sammy Fain, Irving Kahal)
2 You Belong to Me (Chilton Price, Pee Wee King, Redd Stewart)
3 For You
4 Come Rain or Come Shine (Harold Arlen, Johnny Mercer)
5 Shrimp Boats (Paul Mason Howard, Paul Weston)
6 Embraceable You (George Gershwin, Ira Gershwin)
7 St. Louis Blues (William Christopher Handy)
8 All the Things You Are (Jerome Kern, Oscar Hammerstein II)
9 The Gentleman Is a Dope (Richard Rodgers, Oscar Hammerstein II)
10 Stardust (Hoagy Carmichael, Mitchell Parish)
11 Jambalaya (On the Bayou) (Hank Williams, Moon Mullican)
12 I Should Care (Axel Stordahl, Paul Weston, Sammy Cahn)
13 Make Love to Me (Paul Mann, Stephan Weiss, Kim Gannon)
14 Blues in the Night (Harold Arlen, Johnny Mercer)

== Fabulous Song Stylists ==
Fabulous Song Stylists

Compilation album by Jo Stafford
- Released: January 1, 1991
- Genre: Traditional pop, big band
- Label: Sony

Fabulous Song Stylists is a 1991 compilation album of recordings by Jo Stafford. The album was released on the Sony label and sees Stafford backed by Les Brown and his band.

Track listing
1 A Pretty Girl Is Like a Melody (Irving Berlin)
2 I'll Be Seeing You (Sammy Fain, Irving Kahal)
3 Lazy River (Hoagy Carmichael, Sidney Arodin)
4 Ballin' the Jack (Chris Smith, Jim Burns)
5 September in the Rain (Harry Warren, Al Dubin)
6 On the Sunny Side of the Street (Jimmy McHugh, Dorothy Fields)
7 When the Moon Comes over the Mountain (Howard Johnson, Harry M. Woods, Kate Smith)
8 Jersey Bounce (Tiny Bradshaw, Eddie Johnson, Bobby Plater, Buddy Feyne)
9 Summer Wind (Henry Mayer, Johnny Mercer)
10 Stormy Weather (Harold Arlen, Ted Koehler)

== Capitol Collectors Series ==
Capitol Collectors Series is a compilation album of songs by Jo Stafford. It was released on the Capitol Records label on March 18, 1991, and is a collection of her best known hits during the 1940s.

== Greatest Hits ==
Greatest Hits

Greatest hits album by Jo Stafford
- Released: June 15, 1993
- Genre: Traditional pop
- Label: Curb

Professional ratings
Review scores
| Source | Rating |
|---|---|
| Allmusic | 2.5/5 stars |

Greatest Hits is a 1993 compilation album of songs recorded by Jo Stafford, issued by Curb Records as catalog number 77619 and by Corinthian Records as catalog number 106.

Track listing
1 "You Belong to Me" (Chilton Price/Pee Wee King/Redd Stewart)
2 "Make Love to Me"
(George Brunies/Alan Copeland/Paul Mares/Walter Melrose/William Norvas/Ben Pollack/Leon Roppolo/Mel Stitzel)
3 "Shrimp Boats" (Paul Weston/Paul Mason Howard)
4 "Jambalaya (On the Bayou)" (Hank Williams)
5 "'A' You're Adorable (The Alphabet Song)" (Buddy Kaye/Sidney Lippman/Fred Wise)
6 "Scarlet Ribbons (For Her Hair)" (Evelyn Danzig/Jack Segal)
7 "A Sunday Kind of Love" (Barbara Belle/Anita Leonard/Louis Prima/Stan Rhodes)
8 "The Gentleman Is a Dope" (Richard Rodgers/Oscar Hammerstein II)
"Symphony" (Alex Alstone/Roger Bernstein/Jack Lawrence/André Tabet)
10 "Candy" (Mack David/Alex Kramer/Joan Whitney)

== Jonathan and Darlene's Greatest Hits ==
Jonathan and Darlene's Greatest Hits is a 1993 compilation album of songs by Paul Weston and Jo Stafford recorded in the guise of Jonathan and Darlene Edwards, a New Jersey lounge act who performed deliberately off-key, putting their own interpretation on popular songs. The album was released by Corinthian Records on September 11, 1993.

== Jonathan and Darlene's Greatest Hits: Volume 2 ==
Jonathan and Darlene's Greatest Hits: Volume 2 is a 1994 compilation album of songs by Paul Weston and Jo Stafford recorded in the guise of Jonathan and Darlene Edwards, a New Jersey lounge act who performed deliberately off-key, putting their own interpretation on popular songs. The album was released by Corinthian Records on February 22, 1993.

== The Duets ==
The Duets

Compilation album by Jo Stafford and Frankie Laine
- Released: June 28, 1994
- Genre: Traditional pop
- Label: Bear Family

The Duets is a 1994 compilation of recordings by Jo Stafford and Frankie Laine. The album was released on the Bear Family label on June 28, 1994, and has 20 tracks.

Track listing
1 Hey, Good Lookin'
2 Settin' the Woods on Fire
3 Goin' Like Wildfire
4 Rollin' Down the Line
5 Hambone
6 That's the One for Me
7 In the Cool, Cool, Cool of the Evening
8 Pretty Eyed Baby
9 That's Good! That's Bad!
10 Back Where I Belong
11 High Society
12 Chow, Willy
13 Christmas Roses
14 Piece-A-Puddin
15 Let's Have a Party
16 Gambella (The Gamblin' Lady)
17 A Bushel and a Peck
18 Floatin' Down to Cotton Town
19 Way Down Yonder in New Orleans
20 Basin Street Blues

== Portrait Edition ==
Portrait Edition is a three disc box set compilation album released by Sony Entertainment and featuring songs recorded by American singer Jo Stafford. The album was released by Sony on August 30, 1994.

== 16 Most Requested Songs ==
16 Most Requested Songs is a 1995 compilation album of songs recorded by American female singer Jo Stafford.

== For You ==
For You

Compilation album by Jo Stafford
- Released: December 12, 1995
- Genre: Traditional pop
- Label: Memoir

For You is a 1995 compilation album of songs recorded by American singer Jo Stafford. It was released on the Memoir label on December 12, 1995.

Track listing
1 What Can I Say After I Say I'm Sorry
2 Little Man With a Candy Cigar
3 For You
4 Yes, Indeed!
5 Swingin' on Nothing
6Let's Just Pretend
7 Who Can I Turn To?
8 It Isn't a Dream Anymore
9 Embraceable You
10 Blues in the Night
11 The Night We Called It a Day
12 Manhattan Serenade
13 You Can Depend on Me
14 Old Acquaintance
15 How Sweet Are You
16 Too Marvelous for Words
17 I Remember You
18 It Could Happen to You
19 Long Ago (and Far Away)
20 I Love You
21 The Trolley Song
22 Amor, Amor
23 The Day After Forever
24 I Didn't Know About You

== Spotlight on Jo Stafford ==
Spotlight on Jo Stafford is a 1996 compilation album of songs recorded by American singer Jo Stafford. It was released on January 23, 1996, and appears on both the Capitol and EMI labels.

== Drifting and Dreaming with Jo Stafford ==
Drifting and Dreaming with Jo Stafford is a 1996 compilation album of songs recorded by American singer Jo Stafford. It was released on July 9, 1996 on the Jazz Classics label.

== The Jo Stafford Story ==
The Jo Stafford Story

Compilation album by Jo Stafford
- Released: April 1, 1997
- Genre: Traditional pop
- Label: Jasmine Records

The Jo Stafford Story is a 1997 compilation album of songs recorded by American singer Jo Stafford. The album was released by Jasmine Records on April 1, 1997.

Track listing
1 Old Acquaintance
2 I Remember You
3 Too Marvelous for Words
4 How Sweet You Are
5 It Could Happen to You
6 The Trolley Song
7 The Boy Next Door
8 I Love You
9 Long Ago (and Far Away)
10 I Didn't Know About You
11 Walkin' My Baby Back Home
12 There's No You
13 That's for Me
14 Symphony
15 On the Sunny Side of the Street
16 Candy
17 Over the Rainbow
18 I'll Be With You In Apple Blossom Time
19 Let's Take the Long Way Home
20 Sometimes I'm Happy
21 Fools Rush In
22 Ridin' on the Gravy Train
23 This Is Always
24 The Things We Did Last Summer

== The One & Only ==
The One & Only

Compilation album by Jo Stafford
- Released: August 26, 1997
- Genre: Traditional pop
- Label: EMI

Professional ratings
Review scores
| Source | Rating |
|---|---|
| Allmusic | 3/5 stars |

The One & Only is a 1997 compilation album of songs recorded by American singer Jo Stafford. It was released by EMI Records on August 26, 1997.

Track listing
1 I Promise You
2 A Friend of Yours
3 Why Can't You Behave?
4 This Is the Moment
5 Roses of Picardy
6 Smilin' Through
7 The Last Mile Home
8 Red River Valley
9 If I Ever Love Again
10 Happy Times
11 On the Outgoing Tide
12 If I Loved You
13 Goodnight Irene
14 Autumn Leaves
15 Sometime
16 La Vie en Rose
17 Our Very Own
18 I Hate Men
19 Congratulations
20 Old Rugged Cross

== Walkin' My Baby Back Home ==
Walkin' My Baby Back Home is a 1998 compilation album of songs recorded by American singer Jo Stafford. The album was released by See For Miles Records on January 1, 1998.

== G.I. Jo Sings the Hits ==
G.I. Jo Sings the Hits

Compilation album by Jo Stafford
- Released: January 27, 1998
- Genre: Traditional pop
- Label: Prism Platinum

Professional ratings
Review scores
| Source | Rating |
|---|---|
| Allmusic | 2/5 stars |

G.I. Jo Sings the Hits is a 1998 compilation album of songs recorded by American singer Jo Stafford. The album was released on the Prism Platinum label on January 27, 1998.

Track listing
1 Long Ago (and Far Away)
2 Manhattan Serenade
3 For You
4 Yes, Indeed!
5 The Night We Called It a Day
6 Embraceable You
7 The Trolley Song
8 Candy
9 Too Marvelous for Words
10 Little Man With a Candy Cigar
11 Blue Moon
12 The Things We Did Last Summer
13 What Is This Thing Called Love?
14 I Remember You
15 Day by Day
16 This Is Always
17 I Love You
18 It Could Happen to You
19 Blues in the Night
20 Let's Just Pretend
21 You Took My Love
22 Baby, Won't You Please Come Home
23 I'll Be Seeing You

== Too Marvelous for Words ==
Too Marvelous for Words

Compilation album by Jo Stafford
- Released: February 10, 1998
- Genre: Traditional pop
- Label: Memoir

Professional ratings
Review scores
| Source | Rating |
|---|---|
| Allmusic | 3/5 stars |

Too Marvelous for Words is a 1998 compilation album of songs recorded by American singer Jo Stafford. It was released on the Memoir label on February 10, 1998.

Track listing
1 You and Your Love
2 What Is This Thing Called Love?
3 Walkin' My Baby Back Home
4 Pistol Packin' Mama
5 A Boy in Khaki - A Girl in Lace
6 How Sweet You Are
7 I Love You
8 Symphony
9 Too Marvelous for Words
10 This Is Always
11 I'll Be With You In Apple Blossom Time
12 The Things We Did Last Summer
13 Lullaby of Broadway
14 Georgia on My Mind
15 Out of This World
16 Blue Moon
17 Cindy
18 I Didn't Know About You
19 Long Ago (and Far Away)
20 There's No You
21 You Keep Coming Back Like a Song
22 Day by Day
23 I've Never Forgotten

== Coming Back Like a Song: 25 Hits 1941-47 ==
Coming Back Like a Song: 25 Hits 1941–47 is a 1998 compilation album of songs recorded by American singer Jo Stafford. The album was released by ASV on May 19, 1998.

== No Other Love ==
No Other Love

Compilation album by Jo Stafford
- Released: August 4, 1998
- Genre: Traditional pop
- Label: The Entertainers

No Other Love is a 1998 compilation album of songs recorded by American singer Jo Stafford. The album was released on The Entertainers label on August 4, 1998.

Track listing
1 Love for Sale
2 I Got It Bad (And That Ain't Good)
3 Old Devil Moon
4 Anything Goes
5 It Never Entered My Mind
6 Taking a Chance on Love
7 Any Place I Hang My Hat Is Home
8 The Gentleman Is a Dope
9 Happiness Is a Thing Called Joe
10 How High the Moon
11 On the Alamo
12 Tomorrow Mountain
13 No Other Love
14 Serenade of the Bells
15 Speak Low
16 Red River Valley
17 Day by Day
18 A Sunday Kind of Love
20 Symphony
21 Ivy
22 Fools Rush In

== 1940-1944 ==
1940-1944

Compilation album by Jo Stafford
- Released: August 4, 1998
- Genre: Traditional pop
- Label: The Entertainers

1940-1944 is a 1998 compilation album of songs recorded by Jo Stafford. The songs are from the early part of her career, recorded during the Second World War. The album was released on The Entertainers label on August 4, 1998.

Track listing
1 For You
2 What'cha Know Joe?
3 Blues in the Night
4 Blues in the Night
5 Embraceable You
6 Yes, Indeed!
7 Let's Just Pretend
8 It Isn't a Dream Anymore
9 My! My!
10 Who Can I Turn To?
11 What Can I Say After I Say I'm Sorry?
12 Little Man With a Candy Cigar
13 Margie
14 Manhattan Serenade
15 The Night We Called It a Day
16 Candy
17 Conversation While Dancing
18 I'll Be Seeing You

== V-Disc Recordings, Jo Stafford ==
The V-Disc program began in June 1941 and continued until May 1949. It was a way for United States service people stationed overseas to have access to the music that was currently popular "at home". Musicians and recording artists made these special recordings strictly for those serving in the Armed Forces. Jo Stafford produced 20 V-Discs for the entertainment of those in the military during this time; this album is a compilation of the V-Disc recordings she made.

== Happy Holidays: I Love the Winter Weather ==
Happy Holidays: I Love the Winter Weather is a 1999 compilation of seasonal songs recorded by American singer Jo Stafford. It was released by Corinthian Records, the label founded by Stafford and her husband, Paul Weston on October 12, 1999.
