= List of Jo Stafford compilation albums (2010–present) =

The following is a list of compilation albums of songs recorded by U.S. singer Jo Stafford that have been released since 2010. They include material from her solo career, and recordings she made with artists such as Gordon MacRae, as well as her foray into comedy with husband Paul Weston as New Jersey lounge act Jonathan and Darlene Edwards.

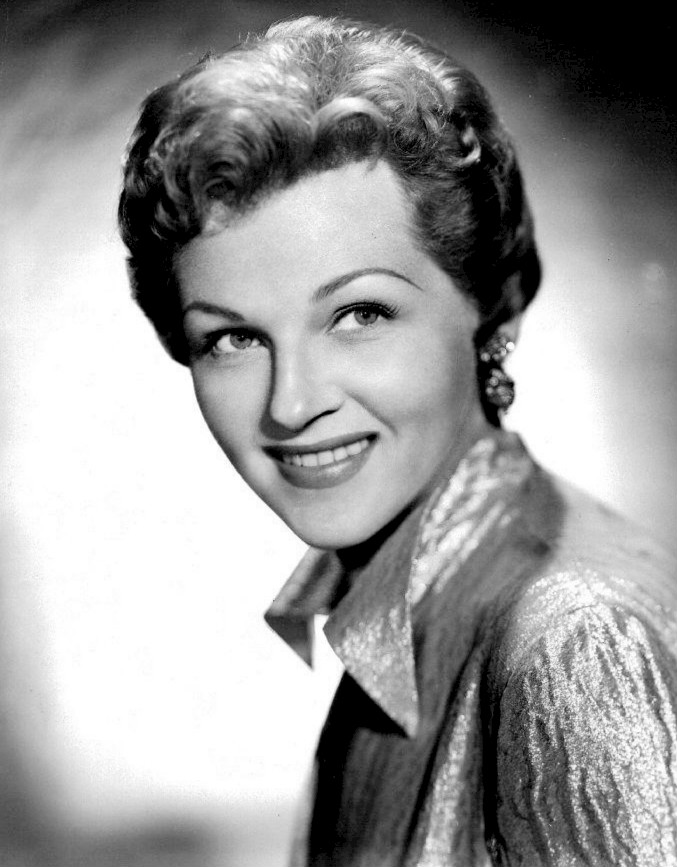
Jo Stafford

== Beyond the Stars: Key Recordings 1940-1959 ==
Beyond the Stars: Key Recordings 1940-1959

Compilation album by Jo Stafford
- Released: July 13, 2010
- Genre: Traditional pop
- Label: JSP

Beyond the Stars: Key Recordings 1940-1959 is a compilation of songs recorded by Jo Stafford. The album includes over 100 songs recorded by Stafford during the 1940s and 1950s, from her time with The Pied Pipers through to her later solo career. The album was released on the JSP label on July 13, 2010.

Track listing
1 Sweet Potato Piper
2 Watcha Know Joe
3 Little Man With a Candy Cigar
4 I'll Take Tallulah
5 A Boy In Khaki, a Girl In Lace
6 Margie
7 Sweet Lorraine
8 Darn That Dream
9 You Can Depend On Me
10 Lullaby of Broadway
11 Deacon Jones
12 Baby Won't You Please Come Home
13 Ivy
14 The Nightingale
15 Red Rosey Bush
16 Roses of Picardy
17 I'm My Own Grandma
18 I'll String Along With You
19 A Thought In My Heart
20 When April Comes Again
21 Teardrops From My Eyes
22 Till We Meet Again
23 Along the Colorado Trail
24 He Bought My Soul At Calvary
25 Hey Good Lookin'
26 The Moment I Saw You
27 Hambone
28 Pretty Boy
29 Easy Come, Easy Go
30 Don't Worry 'Bout Me
31 Something To Remember You By
32 I'm in the Mood for Love
33 September in the Rain
34 As You Desire Me
35 Spring is Here
36 Blue Moon
37 Make the Man Love Me
38 Embraceable You
39 Come Rain or Come Shine
40 My Romance
41 All the Things You Are
42 Dancing In the Dark
43 Night and Day
44 September Song
45 They Say It's Wonderful
46 I'm Your Girl
47 Christmas Blues
48 Adi-Adios Amigo
49 The Dixieland Band
50 April and You
51 Let Me Hear You Whisper
52 Suddenly
53 The Christmas Song
54 The Night Watch
55 Piece a-Puddin'
56 Young and Foolish
57 June In January
58 These Foolish Things
59 But Not For Me
60 My Old Flame
61 A Foggy Day
62 Nice Work If You Can Get It
63 Almost Like Being In Love
64 You're Mine You
65 The Gypsy In My Soul
66 The Lady is a Tramp
67 Autumn Leaves
68 Mine
69 One For My Baby
70 Taking a Chance On Love [Uk 78 Version] [Version]
71 Taking a Chance On Love
72 Speak Low
73 I Got It Bad (and That Ain't Good)
74 Old Devil Moon
75 Love For Sale
76 Anything Goes
77 How High the Moon
78 It Never Entered My Mind
79 Tomorrow Mountain
80 Any Place I Hang My Hat is Home
81 Happiness is Just a Thing Called Joe
82 The Gentleman is a Dope
83 Underneath the Overpass
84 I'll Be There (When You Get Lonely)
85 Silence is Golden
86 Beyond the Stars
87 Echoes In the Night
88 I'll Buy It
89 Sweet Little Darlin'
90 It's Never Quite the Same
91 I May Never Pass This Way Again
92 I'll Walk Alone
93 I'll Be Seeing You
94 I Should Care
95 No Love No Nothing
96 I Fall In Love Too Easily
97 It Could Happen to You
98 I'll Remember April
99 We Mustn't Say Goodbye
100 I Left My Heart At the Stage Door Canteen
101 You'll Never Know
102 I Don't Want To Walk Without You
103 Yesterdays
104 Lazy Moon
105 Hibiscus
106 My Heart is From Missouri
107 All Yours
108 You're Starting To Get To Me
109 Pinetop's Boogie

== The Best of Jo Stafford ==
The Best of Jo Stafford

Compilation album by Jo Stafford
- Released: July 20, 2010
- Genre: Traditional pop
- Label: The Fuel Label Group

Professional ratings
Review scores
Source	Rating
Allmusic	3.5/5 stars

The Best of Jo Stafford is a 2010 compilation album of songs recorded by Jo Stafford. It was released by The Fuel Label Group on July 20, 2010 and contains 23 songs by Stafford.

Track listing
1 For You
2 Conversation While Dancing
3 Carry Me Back to Old Virginny
4 Alone Together
5 When Our Hearts Were Young and Gay
6 Yesterdays
7 I Remember You
8 I Didn't Know About You
9 Tumbling Tumbleweeds
10 I'll Be Seeing You
11 Am I Blue
12 Blue Moon
13 Bakery Blues
14 Lonesome Road
15 I'm Coming Virginia
16 Baby, Won't You Please Come Home
17 Gee, It's Good to Hold You
18 That's for Me
19 Tallahassee
20 Haunted Heart
21 I Wanna Be Loved
22 Dream a Little Dream of Me
23 Driftin' Down the Dream Ol' Ohio

== At the Supper Club ==
This compact disk was created from transcriptions of The Chesterfield Supper Club recorded for the Armed Forces Radio Service (AFRS) in May 1946. Others featured on the broadcasts are Carl Kress and his Orchestra, Helen Carroll and the Satisfiers.

== At the Supper Club Part II ==
This compact disk was created from transcriptions of The Chesterfield Supper Club recorded for the Armed Forces Radio Service (AFRS) in March and April 1946. Others featured on the broadcasts are Carl Kress and his Orchestra, Helen Carroll and the Satisfiers, and Lloyd Shaffer and his Orchestra. Guests are Benny Goodman, Xavier Cugat, Cozy Cole, Mel Powell, and Bob Eberly.

== At the Supper Club Part III ==
At the Supper Club Part III is a 2011 album release of recordings by American singer Jo Stafford. The tracks are taken from her appearances on The Chesterfield Supper Club, the NBC variety program of the 1940s. The recordings on this compilation were made with Lloyd Shaffer and His Orchestra, Paul Weston and His Orchestra, Helen Carroll and The Satisfiers, and The Starlighters. Martin Block is the Master Of Ceremonies.

== For You ==
For You

Compilation album by Jo Stafford
- Released: May 16, 2011
- Genre: Traditional pop
- Label: HHO Licensing

For You is a 2011 compilation album of songs recorded by American singer Jo Stafford. It was released on the HHO label on May 16, 2011.

Track listing
1 Whatcha Know Joe?
2 For You
3 Let's Just Pretend
4 Yes Indeed!
5 What Can I Say After I Say I'm Sorry
6 It Isn't A Dream Anymore
7 Little Man With A Candy Cigar
8 Swingin' On Nothin
9 Who Can I Turn To
10 Embraceable You
11 Blues In The Night
12 Margie
13 My Melancholy Baby/Time On My Hands/
I Can't Give You Anything But Love
14 You Can Depend On Me
15 The Night We Called It A Day
16 Manhattan Serenade
17 My My!
18 Conversation While Dancing
19 Tumbling Tumbleweeds
20 Candy
21 The Day After Forever
22 It Could Happen To You
23 Amor, Amor
24 I'll Be Seeing You

== Complete Original Albums ==
Complete Original Albums

Studio album by Jo Stafford and Paul Weston
- Released: June 21, 2011
- Genre: Traditional pop comedy
- Label: 101 Distribution

Complete Original Albums is a 2011 CD release of two albums recorded by Paul Weston and Jo Stafford in the guise of Jonathan and Darlene Edwards. The CD features the albums The Piano Artistry of Jonathan Edwards (1957) and the Grammy Award winning Jonathan and Darlene Edwards in Paris (1960). In addition there are bonus Stafford and Weston tracks. The album was released on June 21, 2011 on the 101 Distribution label.

Track listing
1 It Might As Well Be Spring
2 Poor Butterfly
3 Autumn in New York
4 Nola
5 Stardust
6 It's Magic
7 Sunday, Monday or Always
8 Jealousy
9 Cocktails for Two
10 Dizzy Fingers
11 Three Coins in the Fountain
12 You're Blasé
13 I Love Paris
14 Valentina
15 Boulevard of Broken Dreams
16 La Vie en Rose
17 The River Seine
18 April in Paris
19 The Poor People of Paris
20 The Last Time I Saw Paris
21 Autumn Leaves
22 Paris in the Spring
23 Mademoiselle de Paree
24 Darling, je vous aime Beaucoup
25 Smoking My Sad Cigarette
26 I Got A Sweetie
27 The Nearness Of You
28 I Should Care
29 Indoor Sport

== Jo Stafford - Fools Rush In: The Great Vocalists of Jazz ==
Jo Stafford - Fools Rush In: The Great Vocalists of Jazz

Compilation album by Jo Stafford
- Genre: Traditional pop
- Label: History/Meridian Music

Jo Stafford - Fools Rush In: The Great Vocalists of Jazz is a 31-track 2-disc compilation album of songs recorded by Jo Stafford. The album contains recordings made by Stafford between 1944 and 1947. It was released on the History label, and by Meridian Music in Germany in 2008.

Track listing
Disc One
1 On The Sunny Side of the Street
2 Over The Rainbow
3 Remember You
4 I Didn't Know About You
5 Walkin' My Baby Back Home
6 The Boy Next Door
7 It Was Just One of Those Things
8 In the Still of the Night
9 I'll Be With You In Apple Blossom Time
10 Fools Rush In
11 Sometimes I'm Happy
12 Sugar (That Sugar Baby O'Mine)
13 Haunted Heart
14 The Best Things In Life Are Free
15 Too Marvelous for Words
Disc Two
1 It Could Happen To You
2 The Trolley Song
3 How Sweet You Are
4 That's For Me
5 I Love You
6 Old Acquaintance
7 I'm So Right Tonight
8 I Never Loved Anyone
9 Long Ago
10 He's Gone Away
11 This Is Always
12 Serenade of the Bells
13 The Things We Did Last Summer
14 Congratulations
15 There's No You
16 Once and for Always

== Something to Remember ==
Something to Remember

Compilation album by Jo Stafford and Paul Weston
- Genre: Traditional pop
- Label: Ross Records

Something to Remember is a compilation album of recordings by Jo Stafford and Paul Weston.

Track listing
1 Blue Moon
2 I'm In The Mood For Love
3 September In The Rain
4 Early Autumn
5 Our Love Is Here To Stay
6 Night and Day
7 Where Are You?
8 Young and Foolish
9 Something To Remember You By
10 Don't Worry 'Bout Me
11 I Cover The Waterfront
12 Don't Get Around Much Anymore

== Jo Stafford & Gordon MacRae - Yesterday - The Definitive Duo ==
Jo Stafford & Gordon MacRae - Yesterday - The Definitive Duo

Compilation album by Jo Stafford and Gordon MacRae
- Released: November 18, 2011
- Genre: Traditional pop
- Label: Jasmine Records

Jo Stafford & Gordon MacRae - Yesterday - The Definitive Duo is a 2011 compilation album of recordings by Jo Stafford and Gordon MacRae released by Jasmine Records on November 18, 2011.

Track listing
Disc One
1 Yesterday (Waltz Song)
2 My Darling, My Darling
3 Bibbidi-Bobbidi-Boo
4 Bluebird of Happiness
5 To Think You've Chosen Me
6 Whispering Hope
7 In the Gloaming
8 Near Me
9 I'll See You After Church On Sunday Morning
10 Last Night
11 Let The Rest Of the World Go By
12 Down the Lane
13 The First Cat Song (Nyot Nyow)
14 Hold Me, Hold Me
15 Love's Old Sweet Song
16 The Rosary
17 Beyond the Sunset
18 Thank You
19 A Thought in My Heart
20 I'm in the Middle of a Riddle
21 Stars of the Summer Night
22 You Are My Love
23 Tea for Two
24 Nights of Splendor (Neapolitan Nights)
25 Echoes
26 Where Are You Gonna Be When the Moon Shines?
27 When Day Is Done
28 Say Something Sweet to Your Sweetheart
29 A Perfect Day
Disc Two
1 I'll String Along with You
2 Long, Long Ago
3 Dearie
4 Girls Were Made to Take Care of Boys
5 Need You
6 Juanita
7 When It's Springtime in the Rockies
8 My One and Only Highland Fling
9 'A' - You're Adorable (The Alphabet Song)
11 Sweet and Low
12 Driftin' Down the Dreary Ol' Ohio
13 Monday, Tuesday, Wednesday
14 Now the Day Is Over
15 Count Your Blessings
16 Scarlet Ribbons
17 Wunderbar
18 Always True to You in My Fashion
19 Were Thine That Special Face
20 Why Can't You Behave?
21 Bianca
22 Too Darn Hot
23 I Hate Men
24 So in Love
25 Gesu Bambino
26 Adeste Fideles (O Come, All Ye Faithful)
28 Christmas Medley

== Jo Sings for You ==
Jo Sings for You

Compilation album by Jo Stafford
- Released: 2011
- Genre: Traditional pop
- Label: Jazzlib

Jo Sings for You is a 2011 compilation of songs recorded by Jo Stafford released on the Jazzlib label.

Track listing
1 (Play A) Simple Melody
2 Walkin' My Baby Back Home
3 The Gentleman Is a Dope
4 It's Great to Be Alive
5 On the Sunny Side of the Street
6 Ragtime Cowboy Joe
7 Swingin' on Nothin'
8 The Best Things in Life Are Free
9 Always True to You Darling in My Fashion
10 Ridin' on the Gravy Train
11 Day by Day
12 Love and the Weather 2:58
13 I Never Loved Anyone
14 Sugar (That Sugar Baby O'Mine)
15 I'll Be with You in Apple Blossom Time
