= Walkin' My Baby Back Home (Jo Stafford album) =

Compilation album by Jo Stafford
- Released: January 1, 1998
- Genre: Traditional pop
- Label: See For Miles Records

Professional ratings
Review scores
Source	Rating
Allmusic	4/5 stars

Walkin' My Baby Back Home is a 1998 compilation album of songs recorded by the American singer Jo Stafford. The album was released by See For Miles Records on January 1, 1998.

== Track listing ==
1. "Little Man with a Candy Cigar"
2. "For You"
3. "Yes Indeed!"
4. "Swingin' on Nothing"
5. "Let's Just Pretend"
6. "Who Can I Turn To"
7. "It Isn't a Dream Anymore"
8. "Embraceable You"
9. "Blues in the Night"
10. "Manhattan Serenade"
11. "You Can Depend on Me"
12. "Old Acquaintance"
13. "How Sweet You Are"
14. "Too Marvelous for Words"
15. "I Remember You"
16. "It Could Happen to You"
17. "Long Ago and Far Away"
18. "I Love You"
19. "The Trolley Song"
20. "Tumbling Tumbleweeds"
21. "Amor, Amor"
22. "The Boy Next Door"
23. "I Didn't Know About You"
24. "There's No You"
25. "I'll Be Seeing You"
26. "Candy"
27. "On the Sunny Side of the Street"
28. "That's for Me"
29. "Symphony"
30. "Walkin' My Baby Back Home"
31. "Day by Day"
32. "This Is Always"
33. "You Keep Coming Back Like a Song"
34. "Fools Rush In"
35. "The Things We Did Last Summer"
36. "Ivy"
37. "Smoke Dreams"
38. "Temptation (Tim-Tayshun)"
39. "I'm So Right Tonight"
40. "A Sunday Kind of Love"
41. "The Gentleman Is a Dope"
42. "Serenade of the Bells"
43. "The Best Things in Life Are Free"
44. "It Was Just One of Those Things"
45. "In the Still of the Night"
46. "I Never Loved Anyone"
47. "He's Gone Away"
48. "Congratulations"
49. "Once and for Always"
50. "Haunted Heart"
