= You Belong to Me (Rajon) =

Compilation album by Jo Stafford
- Released: June 29, 2004
- Genre: Traditional pop
- Label: Rajon Entertainment Pty Ltd

Professional ratings
Review scores
Source	Rating
Allmusic	4/5 stars

You Belong to Me is a 2004 compilation album of songs recorded by American singer Jo Stafford. It is one of many Stafford compilations to have been released in the early 2000s under the title You Belong to Me, the name derived from the song of the same name which became one of her best known hits during the 1950s. This album was released on June 29, 2004 by Rajon Entertainment Pty Ltd.

== Track listing ==
1. "You Belong to Me"
2. "Keep It a Secret"
3. "Way Down Yonder in New Orleans"
4. "A-Round the Corner"
5. "Scarlet Ribbons"
6. "Hambone"
7. "Serenade of the Bells"
8. "That's for Me"
9. "Hey, Good Lookin'"
10. "Some Enchanted Evening"
11. "I Love You"
12. "Haunted Heart"
13. "Day by Day"
14. "Candy"
15. "Whispering Hope"
16. "Long Ago (and Far Away)"
17. "Jambalaya"
18. "Shrimp Boats"
19. "Chow Willy"
20. "Symphony"
21. "Ragtime Cowboy Joe"
22. "Let's Have a Party"
23. "There's No You"
24. "Congratulations"
25. "In the Cool, Cool, Cool of the Evening"
26. "It Could Happen to You"
27. "Gambella (The Gambling Lady)"
28. "Feudin' and Fightin"'
29. "My Darling, My Darling"
30. "The Things We Did Last Summer"
31. "No Other Love"
32. "Goodnight Irene"
