= Coming Back Like a Song: 25 Hits 1941–47 =

Compilation album by Jo Stafford
- Released: May 19, 1998
- Genre: Traditional pop
- Label: ASV

Professional ratings
Review scores
Source	Rating
Allmusic	5/5 stars

Coming Back Like a Song: 25 Hits 1941–47 is a 1998 compilation album of songs recorded by American singer Jo Stafford. The album was released by ASV on May 19, 1998.

== Track listing ==
Track listing
1 Yes, Indeed!
2 Manhattan Serenade
3 It Could Happen to You
4 Long Ago (and Far Away)
5 I Love You
6 The Trolley Song
7 Out of This World
8 Candy
9 There's No You
10 That's for Me
11 Symphony
12 Day by Day
13 Baby Won't You Please Come Home
14 I'll Be With You in Apple Blossom Time
15 You Keep Coming Back Like a Song
16 The Things We Did Last Summer
17Promise
18 Sonata
19 Ivy
20 Temptation (Tim-Tayshun)
21 I'm So Right Tonight
22 Feudin' and Fightin'
23 Serenade of the Bells
24 Black Is the Color
25 White Christmas
