= Her Greatest Hits (Jo Stafford album) =

Compilation album by Jo Stafford
- Released: January 8, 2008
- Genre: Traditional pop
- Label: JSP

Professional ratings
Review scores
| Source | Rating |
|---|---|
| Allmusic | 4.5/5 stars |

Her Greatest Hits is a 2008 compilation album of songs recorded by American artist Jo Stafford. This album, released by JSP on January 8, 2008, features over 100 of Stafford's recordings.

== Track listing ==
Disc #1

1. "Crazy Rhythm"
2. "Piggy Wiggy Woo"
3. "In a Little Spanish Town"
4. "What Is This Thing Called Love?"
5. "What Can I Say After I Say I'm Sorry"
6. "My! My!"
7. "Funny Little Pedro"
8. "You've Got Me This Way"
9. "For You"
10. "Yes, Indeed!"
11. "Swingin' on Nothin"'
12. "It Isn't a Dream Anymore"
13. "Embraceable You"
14. "The Night We Called It a Day"
15. "Blues in the Night"
16. "Manhattan Serenade"
17. "Snooty Little Cutie"
18. "Old Acquaintance"
19. "Pistol Packin' Mama"
20. "Jamboree Jones"
21. "Long Ago (and Far Away)"
22. "Mairzy Doats"
23. "The Trolley Song"
24. "Tumbling Tumbleweeds"
25. "Converstation While Dancing"

Disc #2

1. "Blue Moon"
2. "Baby Won't You Please Come Home"
3. "Bakery Blues"
4. "Carry Me Back to Old Virginia"
5. "I'll Be Seeing You"
6. "Alone Together"
7. "When Our Hearts Were Young and Gay"
8. 3 "Gee, It's Good to Hold You"
9. "Haunted Heart"
10. "Tallahassee"
11. "Georgia on My Mind"
12. "(I'll Be With You) In Apple Blossom Time"
13. "Smilin' Through"
14. "Smoke Dreams"
15. "Tim-Tayshun"
16. "Prisoner of Love Song"
17. "Passing By"
18. "Feudin' and A-Fightin"'
19. "Serenade of the Bells"
20. "The Gentleman Is a Dope"
21. "He's Gone Away"
22. "Autumn in New York"
23. "Smoke Gets in Your Eyes"
24. "Say Something Sweet to Your Sweetheart"
25. "Girls Were Made to Take Care of Boys"
26. "Tea for Two"

Disc #3

1. "Smiles"
2. "Whispering Hope"
3. "Simple Melody"
4. "Goodnight Irene"
5. "Autumn Leaves"
6. "La Vie en Rose"
7. "No Other Love"
8. "The Handsome Stranger"
9. "A Friend of Johnny's"
10. "It is No Secret"
11. "Tennessee Waltz"
12. "My Heart Cries for You"
13. "San Antonio Rose"
14. "With These Hands"
15. "Pretty Eyed Baby"
16. "Allentown Jail"
17. "Star of Hope"
18. "Shrimp Boats"
19. "Kissin' Bug Boogie"
20. "Heaven Drops Her Curtain Down"
21. "There's a Small Hotel"
22. "A-Round the Corner"
23. "As You Desire Me"
24. "Hawaiian War Chant"
25. "Raminay!"
26. "You Belong to Me"
27. "Early Autumn"
28. "Jambalaya"
29. "Without My Lover"

Disc #4

1. "Smoking My Sad Cigarette"
2. "If I Were a Bell"
3. "Just Another Polka"
4. "Basin Street Blues"
5. "Make Love to Me"
6. "Indiscretion"
7. "One Love Forever"
8. "The Temple of an Understand Heart"
9. "Teach Me Tonight"
10. "Darling, Darling, Darling"
11. "I Only Have Eyes for You"
12. "I Got a Sweetie"
13. "Suddenly There's a Valley"
14. "The Nearness of You"
15. "Moonlight in Vermont"
16. "Big D"
17. "Warm All Over"
18. "Wouldn't It Be Lovely"
19. "With a Little Bit of Luck"
20. "Flow Gently Sweet Afton"
21. "Annie Laurie"
22. "The Gypsy in My Soul"
23. "But Not for Me"
24. "Bells Are Ringing"
25. "On London Bridge"
26. "The King of Paris"
27. "Black out the Moon"
28. "St. Louis Blues"
