= Capitol Collectors Series (Jo Stafford album) =

Compilation album by Jo Stafford
- Released: March 18, 1991
- Genre: Traditional pop
- Label: Capitol

Capitol Collectors Series is a compilation album of songs by Jo Stafford. It was released on the Capitol Records label on March 18, 1991, and is a collection of her best known hits during the 1940s.

== Track listing ==
1. "Old Acquaintance"
2. "How Sweet You Are"
3. "Long Ago (And Far Away)"
4. "I Love You"
5. "It Could Happen to You"
6. "The Trolley Song"
7. "There's No You"
8. "That's for Me"
9. "Symphony"
10. "Ridin' on the Gravy Train"
11. "This Is Always"
12. "The Things We Did Last Summer"
13. "Smoke Dreams"
14. "Temptation [Tim-Tayshun]" (with Red Ingle)
15. "I'm So Right Tonight"
16. "Serenade of the Bells"
17. "I Never Loved Anyone"
18. "He's Gone Away"
19. "Congratulations"
20. "Once and for Always"
21. "Some Enchanted Evening"
22. "Whispering Hope" (with Gordon MacRae)
23. "Ragtime Cowboy Joe"
24. "Scarlet Ribbons (For Her Hair)"
25. "It's Great to Be Alive" (with Johnny Mercer)
26. "No Other Love"

== Reception ==
Professional ratings
Review scores
Source	Rating
Allmusic	4.5/5 stars

Stephen Thomas Erlewine of Allmusic calls the album "an exquisite collection of Stafford's most memorable love songs from the '40s".
