= Portrait Edition (Jo Stafford album) =

Compilation album by Jo Stafford
- Released: August 30, 1994
- Genre: Traditional pop
- Label: Sony

Professional ratings
Review scores
Source	Rating
AllMusic	Portrait Edition at AllMusic

Portrait Edition is a three disc box set compilation album released by Sony Entertainment and featuring songs recorded by American singer Jo Stafford. The album was released by Sony on August 30, 1994.

== Track listing ==
Disc 1

1. "Little Man With a Candy Cigar" - (Matt Dennis; Frank Kilduff)

2. "Haunted Heart" - (Howard Dietz; Arthur Schwartz)

3. "If" - (Stanley Damerell; Tolchard Evans; Robert Hargreaves)

4. "In a Little Spanish Town ('Twas On a Night Like This)" - (Sam M. Lewis; Joe Young; Mabel Wayne)

5. "April and You" - (Al Frisch; Allan Roberts)

6. "Where Are You?" - (Gus Kahn; Al Rinker)

7. "The Trolley Song" - (Hugh Martin; Ralph Blaine)

8. "I'll Remember April" - (Gene DePaul; Don Raye; Patricia Johnston)

9. "Blues in The Night" - (Harold Arlen; Johnny Mercer)

10. "Floatin' Down to Cotton Town" - (F. Henri Klickmann; Manfred Weissleder)

11. "Every Night When the Sun Goes in" - (Traditional)

12. "The Night We Called It A Day" - (Matt Dennis; Tom Adair)

13. "The Gentleman is a Dope" - (Richard Rodgers; Oscar Hammerstein II)

14. "My Darling, My Darling" - (Frank Loesser)

15. "Young and Foolish" - (Albert Hague; Arnold B. Horwitt)

16. "Tomorrow Mountain" - (Duke Ellington; John Latouche)

17. "(There'll Be) Peace in the Valley (For Me)" - (Thomas A. Dorsey)

18. "Teardrops From My Eyes" - (Rudy Toombs)

19. "Dancing in the Dark" - (Howard Dietz; Arthur Schwartz)

20. "Love is Here to Stay" - (George Gershwin; Ira Gershwin)

21. "The Gypsy in My Soul" - (Clay Boland; Moe Jaffe)

22. "Imagination" - (Johnny Burke; James Van Heusen)

23. "If I Were a Bell" - (Frank Loesser)

24. "No Other Love" - (Bob Russell; Paul Weston)

25. "You're Blasé" - (Bruce Sievier; Ord Hamilton)

Disc 2

1. "You and Your Love" - (Johnny Green; Johnny Mercer)

2. "As I Love You" - (Ray Evans; Jay Livingston)

3. "Teach Me Tonight" - (Sammy Cahn; Gene DePaul)

4. "When April Comes Again" - (Doris Schaefer; Paul Weston)

5. "St. Louis Blues" - (W. C. Handy)

6. "Good Nite" - (Bert Bender / Dorothy Jeffers; Ethel Phillips)

7. "Make the Man Love Me" - (Dorothy Fields; Arthur Schwartz)

8. "Warm All Over" - (Frank Loesser)

9. "The Best Things in Life Are Free" - (Lew Brown; Buddy DeSylva; Ray Henderson)

10. "One" (Based on "One Hand, One Heart") - (Leonard Bernstein; Stephen Sondheim)

11. "These Foolish Things (Remind Me of You)" - (Harry Link; Holt Marvell; Jack Strachey)

12. "In the Cool, Cool, Cool of the Evening" - (Hoagy Carmichael; Johnny Mercer)

13. "The Nearness of You" - (Hoagy Carmichael; Ned Washington)

14. "Smoking My Sad Cigarette" - (Don George; Bee Walker)

15. "The Party's Over" - (Betty Comden; Adolph Green; Jule Styne)

16. "The Folks Who Live On the Hill" - (Oscar Hammerstein II; Jerome Kern)

17. "A Thought in My Heart" - (Robert F. Calder)

18. "Yes, Indeed!" - (Sy Oliver)

19. "I'm Your Girl" - (Oscar Hammerstein II; Richard Rodgers)

20. "When I'm Not Near the Boy I Love" - (E.Y. “Yip” Harburg; Burton Lane)

21. "Whispering Hope" - (Alice Hawthorne)

22. "Shenandoah" - (Traditional)

23. "What Can I Say After I Say I'm Sorry?" - (Walter Donaldson; Abe Lyman)

24. "I'll Be Seeing You" - (Sammy Fain; Irving Kahal)

25. "Candy" - (Mack David; Alex Kramer; Joan Whitney)

26. "The Last Time I Saw Paris" - (Oscar Hammerstein II; Jerome Kern)

Disc 3

1. "All the Things You Are" - (Oscar Hammerstein II; Jerome Kern)

2. "If I Loved You" - (Oscar Hammerstein II; Richard Rodgers)

3. "What is This Thing Called Love?" - (Cole Porter)

4. "Come Rain or Come Shine" - (Harold Arlen; Johnny Mercer)

5. "With These Hands" - (Benny Davis; Abner Silver)

6. "Use Your Imagination" - (Cole Porter)

7. "Three-Cornered Tune" - (Frank Loesser)

8. "It Happened in Sun Valley" - (Mack Gordon; Harry Warren)

9. "Don't Get Around Much Anymore" - (Duke Ellington; Bob Russell)

10. "Oh! Look at Me Now" - (Joe Bushkin; John DeVries)

11. "I Don't Stand a Ghost of a Chance with You" - (Bing Crosby; Ned Washington; Victor Young)

12. "My Heart's In The Highlands" - (Robert Burns; Al Rinker)

13. "My One and Only Highland Fling" - (Ira Gershwin; Harry Warren)

14. "I Didn't Know About You" - (Duke Ellington; Bob Russell)

15. "Indiscretion" - (Sammy Cahn; Alessandro Cicognini; Paul Weston)

16. "Old Devil Moon" - (E.Y. "Yip" Harburg; Burton Lane)

17. "For You" - (Joe Burke; Al Dubin)

18. "Silence is Golden" - (Jack Fulton; Lois Steele)

19. "The King of Paris" - (Marilyn Bergman; Paul Weston)

20. "I Should Care" - (Sammy Cahn; Axel Stordahl; Paul Weston)

21. "Stardust" - (Hoagy Carmichael; Mitchell Parish)

22. "I See Your Face Before Me" - (Howard Dietz; Arthur Schwartz)

23. "You Belong to Me" - (Pee Wee King; Chilton Price; Redd Stewart)

24. "Stayin' Alive" - (Barry Gibb; Maurice Gibb; Robin Gibb)

25. "I Am Woman" - (Ray Burton; Helen Reddy)
