= No Other Love =

No Other Love may refer to:

- "No Other Love" (1950 song), a song credited to Bob Russell and Paul Weston, based on an etude by Frédéric Chopin
- "No Other Love" (1953 song), a song by Richard Rodgers and Oscar Hammerstein II
- "No Other Love" (album), an album by Jo Stafford
- No Other Love, a 1979 film with Richard Thomas and Julie Kavner
- No Other Love, a 1982 film with Albert Martinez
- No Other Love (film), an unreleased Chinese film
- "No Other Love", a song by Matchbox Twenty featuring Amanda Shires from the 2023 album Where the Light Goes
- "No Other Love" (A Touch of Frost), a 1997 television episode
