= International Hits (Jo Stafford album) =

Compilation album by Jo Stafford
- Released: January 1, 2001
- Genre: Traditional pop
- Label: Corinthian Records

Professional ratings
Review scores
Source	Rating
Allmusic	4/5 stars

International Hits is a 2001 compilation album of songs recorded by American singer Jo Stafford. It was released on January 1, 2001, by Corinthian Records, the company founded by Stafford and her husband Paul Weston.

== Track listing ==
1. Little Man With a Candy Cigar
2. Around the Corner
3. Allentown Jail
4. On London Bridge
5. No Other Love
6. Come Rain or Come Shine
7. Long Ago (and Far Away)
8. September Song
9. Teach Me Tonight
10. Keep It a Secret
