= International Hits =

International Hits may refer to:

- International Hits (Jo Stafford album), 2001
- The World's Greatest International Hits, a 1965 Petula Clark album
- Elvis Presley international hit singles
