= Stars of the Summer Night =

Stars of the Summer Night may refer to one of the following:

- Stars of the Summer Night (song), a song by Isaac B. Woodbury
- Stars of the Summer Night (album), an album by Jo Stafford
