= List of Jo Stafford compilation albums =

The following articles contain lists of Jo Stafford compilation albums:

- List of Jo Stafford compilation albums (1955–1999)
- List of Jo Stafford compilation albums (2000–2009)
- List of Jo Stafford compilation albums (2010–present)
