= Cocktail hour (disambiguation) =

Cocktail hour may refer to:

- Happy hour
- Cocktail Hour (film), 1933 film
- The Cocktail Hour, a 1988 play by A. R. Gurney
- Cocktail Hour, an album; see List of Jo Stafford compilation albums (2000–09)
- "The Cocktail Hour" (Rising Damp), a 1977 television episode
