= Haunted Heart =

Haunted Heart may refer to:

- "Haunted Heart", a 1948 song by Howard Dietz and Arthur Schwartz from Inside U.S.A., covered by Perry Como and Jo Stafford
- Haunted Heart a song by Alias, 1990
- Haunted Heart (Renée Fleming album), 2005
- Haunted Heart (Sammy Kershaw album), 1993
  - "Haunted Heart" (Sammy Kershaw song), 1993
- Haunted Heart (Charlie Haden album), 1991
- "Haunted Heart" (Christina Aguilera song), 2019
- Haunted Heart, an album by Jo Stafford, see List of Jo Stafford compilation albums
- Haunted Heart (film), a 2024 Spanish-Colombian thriller film
