= The Capitol Rarities 1943–1950 =

Compilation album by Jo Stafford
- Released: March 24, 2009
- Genre: Traditional pop
- Label: DRG

Professional ratings
Review scores
Source	Rating
Allmusic	4/5 stars

The Capitol Rarities 1943–1950 is a 2009 compilation album of songs recorded by American singer Jo Stafford. It was released on March 24, 2009, on the DRG label and is a collection of rare recordings from the earlier part of her career.

== Track listing ==
1. Out of This World
2. Conversation While Dancing
3. Alone Together
4. Gee, It's Good to Hold You
5. You May Not Love Me
6. This Time
7. Promise
8. It's as Simple as That
9. Through a Thousand Dreams
10. Give Me Something to Dream About
11. It's Monday Every Day
12. It Was Written in the Stars
13. Jolly Jo
14. If I Ever Love Again
15. Open Door, Open Arms
16. Pagan Love Song
17. Our Very Own
18. Diamonds Are a Girl's Best Friend
19. Prisoner of Love's Song
20. This Is the Moment
21. The Stanley Steamer
22. Candy
23. Tell Me Why
24. White Christmas
