= The Four Coins =

American vocal group

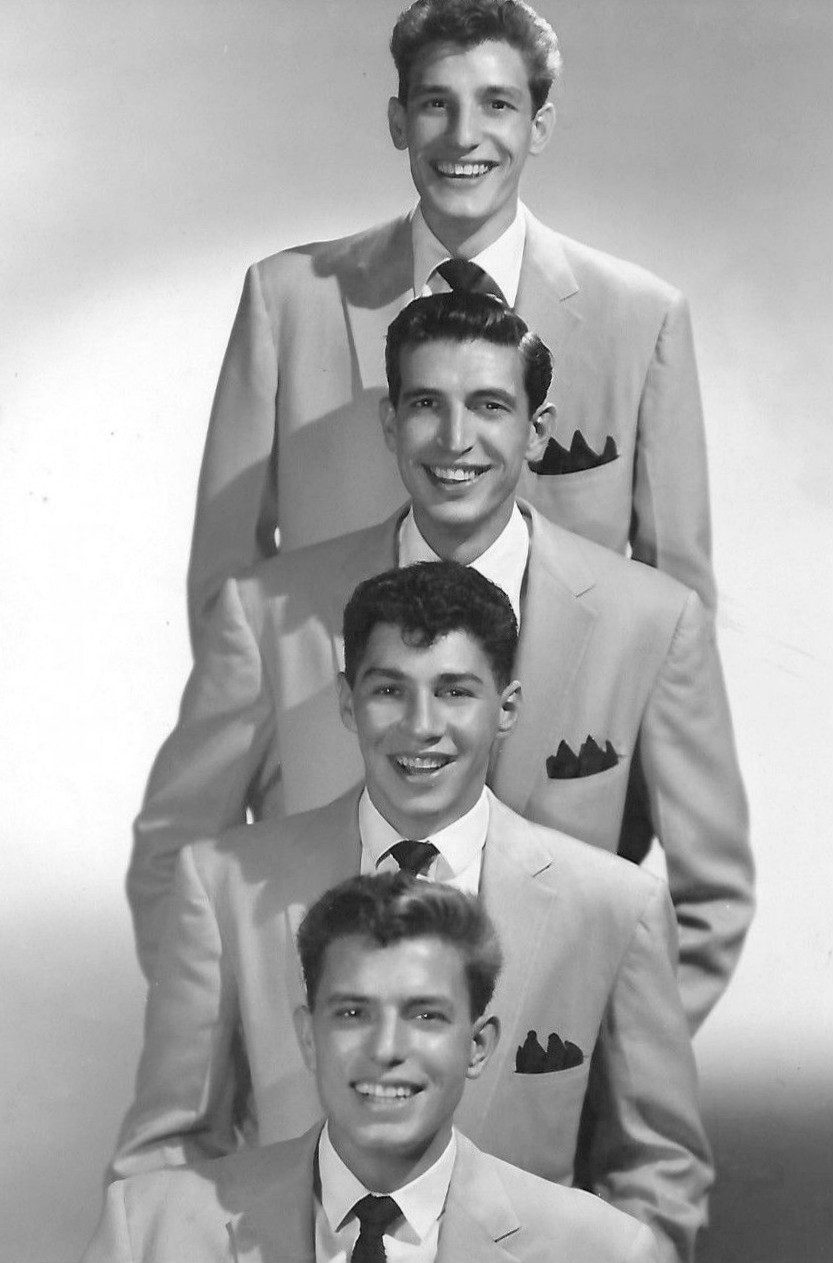
The group in 1954

The Four Coins were a popular American vocal group, consisting of Jimmy Gregorakis, George Mantalis, and brothers George and Jack Mahramas. They were all of Greek heritage and came from Canonsburg, Pennsylvania. A local orchestra leader, Lee Barrett, took them to audition in Cincinnati, Ohio and this led to their cutting some high-charting records and appearing on television. This also led to a recording contract with Columbia Records recording on the Epic label.

The group used the name the Four Keys until they learned another vocal group had it under copyright. They then became The Four Coins.

They appeared in the 1957 Warner Brothers rock and roll movie Jamboree singing the song "A Broken Promise".

In 1970, however, they left show business to tend to family obligations, not performing again until 2003, when they performed two final shows back in their home town.

George Mantalis died of lung cancer on December 10, 2016, at the age of 81. Jack Mahramas also died of lung cancer on June 24, 2023, at the age of 82.

== Singles ==
1953

- Carona Records: "Hot Toddy"/"High Noon" [as The Four Keys]

1954

- Carona Records: "I'll Make The Best Of It" [as The Four Keys]
- Epic 5-9074: "We’ll Be Married In the Church In The Wildwood"/"Once More" (US #30)
- Epic 5-9082: "I Love You Madly"/"Maybe" (US #28)

1955

- Epic 5-9091: "My Anxious Heart"/"Oh Mother Dear"
- Epic 5-9104: "That's The Way"/"Promises, Promises"
- Epic 5-9107: "Story Untold"/"Magnolia"
- Epic 5-9116: "The Song That Brought Us Together"/"Need You"
- Epic 5-9129: "Memories Of You"/"Tear Down The Fence" (US #22)

1956

- Epic 5-9148: "The Song That God Sings"/"The Old Professor"
- Epic 5-9164: "Cherry Lips"/"All My Tomorrows"
- Epic 5-9171: "One Kiss (Is Worth A Thousand Words)"/"This I Offer You"
- Epic 5-9183: "Manhattan Serenade"/"Too Late"
- Epic 5-9192: "Destination Love"/"Time Of The Year"

1957

- Epic 5-9200: "My Love Is A Little Kitten"/"Falling Star"
- Epic 5-9213: "Shangri-La"/"First In Line" (US #11)
- Epic 5-9229: "My One Sin"/"This Life" (US #28)
- Epic 5-9253: "Follow Your Heart"/"A Broken Promise"
- Epic 5-9258: "My Love Loves Me"/"New World"

1958

- Epic 5-9276: "Dream World"/"One Life, One Love"
- Epic 5-9286: "Wendy, Wendy "/"Be Still In My Heart" (US #72)
- Epic 5-9295: "The World Outside"/"Roselle" (US #21)

1959

- Epic 5-9306: "Angel Of Love"/"Who Are You"
- Epic 5-9314: "One Love, One Heart"/"My First Love" (US #82/#106)
- Epic 5-9337: "Angel In The Rain"/"The First Signs Of Love"
- Epic 5-9348: "Serenade Of The Bells"/"Buon Natale Means (Merry Christmas To You)"
- Fontana H.168: "The World Outside"/"Be Still in my Heart"

1960

- Epic 5-9383: "You’re Breaking My Heart"/"My Only Love"
- MGM Records K12951: "Pledging My Love"/"I Want a Little Girl"

1961

- MGM Records K12977: "Beat On Your Drum Little Suzan"/"Love Is Where You Are"
- MGM Records K13003: "To Love"/"From Your Very Own Lips"
- MGM Records K13031: "Pretty Nina "/"The Moon Of Manakoora"
- Jubilee 45-5411: "The Miracle Of St. Marie"/"Gee, Officer Krupkie"

1962

- Jubilee 45-5419: "Come A Little Bit Closer"/"Windows Of Heaven"
- Jubilee 45-5429: "Wish You Were Here"/"One Red Rose"
- Vee Jay Records VJ 474: "They Say"/"Jimmy San"

1963

- Vee Jay Records VJ 551: "Nina"/"(Little Darlin‘) Take A Bow"

1964

- Joy Records 45K-284: "Boys Cry"/"Love Me with All Your Heart (Cuando Calienta El Sol)"
- Joy Records 45K-287: "Joanna"/"Answer Me My Love"

1966

- Laurie Records LR-3331: "I’ll Never Love Again"/"Try Your Luck"
- Laurie Records LR-3360: "Shout Shout (Knock Yourself Out)"/"People Get Jealous"

1967

- Columbia 4-44006: "If You Love Me (Really Love Me)"/"Learning To Live Without Your Love"

Year unknown

- LanCo 2005/2006: "Maybe She’s Right"/"Forward Together"
- LanCo 6900: "Hocus Pocus Dominicus"/"Forward Together"

== Albums and EPs ==
1955

- EP Epic EG 7164: Memories Of You / Rio Rita

A: Memories Of You * Rio Rita
B: The Song That Brought Us Together * Need You

- 10-inch LP Epic LN-1104: The Four Coins

A: I Love You Madly * Maybe * My Anxious Heart
B: Rio Rita * We'll Be Married (In The Church In The Wildwood) * That's The Way

1957

- LP Epic LN-3445: The Four Coins In Shangri-La

A: Shangri-La * Memories Of You * Heartache Street (And Teardrop Ave.) * Lovers’ Island * Manhattan Serenade * The Curly-Headed Kid In The Third Row
B: You're Breaking My Heart * This Life * Ting-A-Ling Telephone * New World * I Will Never Be The Same * Maybe

1958

- EP Epic ZTEP 60057/60058

A: Sal Mineo – My Bride * The Four Coins – All The Things You Are
B: Roy Hamilton – Great Day * Somethin‘ Smith & The Redheads – I Can't Get Started With You

1961

- LP MGM Records E3944: Greek Songs

A: Never On Sunday * The Girl I Want * In My Never Never Land * Rikoko * True True Love * There's Only One For Me
B: Oh Mustapha * Our Song Of Love * Carnation In Your Hair * Dance My Darling * Sum Yo Ti Sa * In Saloniki

1965

- LP Roulette SR-25288: Greek Songs Mama Never Taught Me

A: Iste Gynekes * Adio Athina * Thessaloniki * To Stauro Sou * San Sfyrikso 3 Fores * Pekse File To Bouzouki
B: Ela Ela * Thelo Nase Eftyhismeni * Poun Afta Tamatia * Himones Ftinoporake Kanokieria * Aspres Kordeles * Na Borousana Petakso San Paoli

1995

- CD Collectibles COL-5498: In Shangri-La

Shangri-La * Memories Of You * Heartache Street * Lovers' Island * Manhattan Serenade * The Curly-Headed Kid In The Third Row * You're Breaking My Heart * This Life * Ting-A-Ling Telephone * New World * I Will Never Be The Same * Maybe * I Love You Madly * My Anxious Heart * Rio Rita * We'll Be Married * That's The Way * My One Sin * The World Outside

2011

- CD Small Change 1001: Back From Shangri-La Volume 2

I'll Never Love Again * Try Your Luck * Story Untold * If You Love Me (Really Love Me) * Falling Star * One Life, One Love * Joanna * Answer Me, My Love * Shout, Shout * People Get Jealous * The Miracle Of St. Marie * My Love Loves Me * Wish You Were Here * Learning To Live Without Your Love * (Little Darlin') Take A Vow * One Red Rose * Jimmy San * Love Is Where You Are * From Your Very Own Lips * To Love * Love Me With All Of Your Heart * Boys Cry * Wendy, Wendy * Follow Your Heart * Shangri-La
