= 'A' You're Adorable =

Song
- Published: 1948
- Composer: Sid Lippman
- Lyricists: Buddy Kaye, Fred Wise

"'A' You're Adorable" is a popular song with music by Sid Lippman and lyrics by Buddy Kaye and Fred Wise, published in 1948.

== Charted versions ==
The most well-known version was recorded by Perry Como, with The Fontane Sisters on March 1, 1949. This recording was released on single records as follows:

- In the United States, by RCA Victor, on 78 rpm and 45 rpm, in 1949, with the flip side "When Is Sometime?" This record reached number 1 on the US chart on April 9, 1949.
- In the United Kingdom, by His Master's Voice, on 78 rpm in June 1949, with the flip side "Forever and Ever"
- In Japan, by Victor Entertainment, on 78 rpm, with the flip side "Bali Ha'i"
- In Australia, by His Master's Voice, on 78 rpm, with the flip side "My Melancholy Baby"

Another recording by Jo Stafford and Gordon MacRae was also very popular. The recording was released by Capitol Records. The flip side was "Need You". The recording first appeared on the Billboard charts on March 25, 1949, lasting 13 weeks and peaking at position number 4.

Another recording by the Tony Pastor orchestra (vocal by the Clooney Sisters) also charted. The recording was released by Columbia Records. The recording first appeared on the Billboard charts on May 6, 1949, lasting 2 weeks and peaking at position number 12.

== In popular culture ==
In the first season of Sesame Street, a Muppet named Jack sang the song for his Muppet girlfriend Adrienne while throwing away alphabet letter blocks as they were conveyed to him on a conveyor belt in sequential order. At the end of the song, Cookie Monster suddenly appeared, scaring Adrienne away, and told Jack those were his blocks. Jack recited the song in a looser form as he recovered the blocks in alphabetical order and handed them to Cookie, who ate them as he received them.

== See also ==
- Alphabet song
