= I'll Walk Alone =

1944 song by Sammy Cahn and Jule Styne

Single by Dinah Shore
- B-side: "It Could Happen to You"
- Published: February 24, 1944 by Mayfair Music Corp., New York
- Released: May 19, 1944
- Recorded: April 11, 1944
- Venue: Introduced "Follow The Boys" April 25, 1944
- Genre: Popular music, Musical film
- Length: 2:44
- Label: Victor 20-1586
- Composer: Jule Styne
- Lyricist: Sammy Cahn

"I'll Walk Alone" is a 1944 popular song with music by Jule Styne and lyrics by Sammy Cahn. The song was written for the 1944 musical film Follow the Boys, in which it was sung by Dinah Shore, and was nominated for the Academy Award for Best Original Song but lost to “Swinging on a Star”. Shore recorded the song in March as a single, which became her first #1 hit on the Billboard charts.

"I'll Walk Alone" was released in May 1944 on Victor 20-1586, and first appeared in 'The Billboard' on June 3, 1944. Competing versions were released by Martha Tilton, Mary Martin, Louis Prima, and others. It finally reached the top ten of the Best Selling and "Most Played Juke Box Records" charts in August 1944. Despite charting with Bing Crosby's "Swinging On A Star", "I'll Walk Alone" remained in the top ten of the Best Selling Records chart for twenty consecutive weeks, with four of those as the number one song in the nation. It also reached number one on the Juke Box chart, finally exiting in January 1945 after 26 weeks. It was rated the number six record of 1944, Shore's biggest career hit until she topped herself in 1948 with "Buttons and Bows."

== Lyrics ==
Like other songs that came out during the World War II years such as "Till Then," it reflects the enforced separation of couples caused by the war. While "Till Then" is written from the point of view of the soldier wanting his lover to wait for him, "I'll Walk Alone" is written from the point of view of the stay-at-home lover, promising to be true.

== Recordings ==
- Dinah Shore made the best-known version of this song, recording it twice. She first introduced it in the Universal Studios film Follow the Boys (1944), taking it to the top of the charts (her first #1 hit) for four weeks and reaching number ten on The Harlem Hit Parade chart in 1944. Shore later recorded the song in the early 1960s.
- Martha Tilton and Mary Martin also fared well, placing the song in the Billboard Top Ten.
- The song was performed by actress Susan Hayward in the 1952 20th Century Fox film With A Song In My Heart, the biography of singer Jane Froman. The song was recorded by Froman on the accompanying soundtrack album (1952).
- Oddly, when "I'll Walk Alone" was revived in the 1950s, it was often done by male singers, with a very popular version being done by Don Cornell (1952 top ten).
- In 1944, a version was recorded by Louis Prima and his Orchestra, with vocals by Lily Ann Carol.
- Teen idol Ricky Nelson recorded a version for his 1958 album Ricky Nelson. In the Pop Chronicles documentary, Cahn himself performed the song while explaining that it began with a phone call from Follow the Boys producer Charles K. Feldman.
- Jazz singer Nancy Wilson recorded the song for her 1969 album But Beautiful.

== Popular culture ==
- For the film, Flags of Our Fathers, director Clint Eastwood sings his version of the song on the soundtrack.
- In the episode of The Phil Silvers Show named "The Eating Contest", this was the song that depressed Private Ed Honnergar, played by Fred Gwynne, making him have unlimited eating capacity, which was exploited by Sgt. Bilko to win an eating contest.
