= My Darling, My Darling =

"My Darling, My Darling" is a popular song, written by Frank Loesser and published in 1948. It was originally introduced by Byron Palmer and Doretta Morrow in the Broadway musical Where's Charley? (1948).

== 1948 charted versions ==
Charted versions were by:

- The most well-known recording, by Jo Stafford and Gordon MacRae, was released by Capitol Records as catalog number 15270. It first reached the Billboard magazine Best Seller chart on November 5, 1948 and lasted 16 weeks on the chart, peaking at #3. On some other charts, this version reached #1.
- Another version, by Doris Day and Buddy Clark, was released by Columbia Records as catalog number 38353. It first reached the Billboard magazine Best Seller chart on November 12, 1948 and lasted 13 weeks on the chart. This version (with the flip side "A Certain Party") reached #7 on the Billboard chart.
- The recording by Peter Lind Hayes was released by Decca Records as catalog number 24519. It first reached the Billboard magazine Best Seller chart on December 24, 1948 and lasted 2 weeks on the chart, peaking at #20. This was Hayes' only charting hit.

Other versions were by:

- Joni James - for her album Joni Sings Songs by Victor Young and Songs by Frank Loesser (1956).
- Norman Wisdom - for the album Where's Charley? (1958).
- Sarah Vaughan - for her 1958 album Sarah Vaughan Sings Broadway: Great Songs from Hit Shows.
- Jaye P. Morgan - a single release in 1959.
- Julie London - a single release in 1961.
- Johnny Mathis - for his album Rapture (1962)
- Brook Benton - for his album That Old Feeling (1966).
