= Allentown Jail =

1963 single by The Lettermen

Single by The Lettermen
- B-side: "Two Brothers"
- Released: 1963
- Label: Capitol
- Songwriter: Irving Gordon

The Lettermen singles chronology
"Heartache Oh Heartache" (1963)	"Allentown Jail" (1963)	"Where or When" (1963)

"Allentown Jail" is a folk-style song, written by Irving Gordon.

== Background ==
The song tells the story of a man who tries to steal a diamond ring for his girlfriend, gets caught, and ends up in the Allentown jail.

== Recordings ==
- In 1951, Jo Stafford recorded this song. It was released as a single on Columbia Records.
- In 1960, Kathy Linden recorded it as her first single on Monument Records.
- The Kingston Trio recorded a version in 1962, as the song became popular in the folk scene. The trio had plans of releasing it as a single, but the single never came to fruition. Their version has since been released on various CD compilations of their works.
- In 1963, a more harmonic arrangement was performed by The Lettermen and released as a single. This version incurred some success, but only to a minor degree.
- Other artists who recorded this song include The Seekers, The Springfields, Billy Strange, and British singers Lita Roza and Karen Young. There is also a French adaptation of the song, "Les prisons du roy", by Edith Piaf, which was later covered by Marianne Faithfull.
