= Keep It a Secret =

Single by Jo Stafford
- B-side: "Once to Every Heart"
- Released: 1952
- Recorded: 1952
- Genre: Pop
- Length: 2:36
- Label: Columbia
- Songwriter: Jessie Mae Robinson

Jo Stafford singles chronology
"Early Autumn" (1952)	"Keep It a Secret" (1952)	"Chow Willy" (1953)

"Keep It a Secret" is a popular song written by Jessie Mae Robinson and published in 1952.

== Jo Stafford version ==
The best-selling recording of the song was made by Jo Stafford with Paul Weston and His Orchestra in 1952. It was released by Columbia Records. The record first reached the Billboard magazine charts on November 8, 1952, and spent 17 weeks on the chart, peaking at number six. It also reached number five on the Cash Box chart in early 1953.

== Other recordings ==
- Dinah Shore with Frank De Vol and his orchestra recorded the song in Hollywood on August 18, 1952. It was released by RCA Victor Records and by EMI on their His Master's Voice label.
- Bing Crosby recorded it on November 12, 1952, with John Scott Trotter and His Orchestra and this charted briefly with a peak position of No. 28.
- June Hutton, with Axel Stordahl and his orchestra, recorded Keep It a Secret in 1952. It was backed by I Miss You So on Capitol 2268.
- Slim Whitman - recorded the song for a single release in 1952. He recorded the song again in 1967 for the album Slim Whitman – 15th Anniversary Album.
- Gene Vincent and His Blue Caps - included in the album A Gene Vincent Record Date (1958).
- Joni James - included in the album Joni James – Country Style (1962).
- Ronnie Dove recorded the song for part of his Right or Wrong album (1964).
