= Jasmine Records =

UK record label; London-based jazz reissue label (est. 1982)

Jasmine Records is a London-based record label that specialises in reissues of public domain music (pre-1963 in the UK).

== History ==
The label was founded in 1982 as part of Hasmick Promotions, issuing LPs and cassettes of jazz and popular vocalists. Jasmine diversified into country music in 1985. In 1990, the label released its first compact disc.
