= Walkin' My Baby Back Home (song) =

Song
- Language: English
- Published: 1930
- Genre: Jazz
- Composer: Fred E. Ahlert
- Lyricist: Roy Turk

"Walkin' My Baby Back Home" is a popular song written in 1930 by Roy Turk (lyrics) and Fred E. Ahlert (music).

The song first charted in 1931 with versions by Nick Lucas (No. 8), Ted Weems (also No. 8), The Charleston Chasers (No. 15) and Lee Morse (No. 18).

== Other recordings ==
- A recording made by Jo Stafford on November 9, 1945, was released by Capitol Records as catalog number 20049, and on her album, Songs by Jo Stafford (catalog number B-D23).
- Harry Richman recorded the song on November 4, 1947. This version was released by Decca Records as catalog number 24391.
- Maurice Chevalier recorded the song on February 22, 1931 for Victor Records in New York.
- A major hit version of it was recorded by Nat King Cole at the Capitol Studios at 5515 Melrose Avenue in Hollywood, on September 4, 1951 and released by Capitol Records as catalog number 2130. It went to No. 8 in 1952.
- The song charted again in 1952 at No. 4 in a version recorded in February 1952 by Johnnie Ray, released by Columbia Records as catalog number 39750. Ray's version peaked at number 12 in the UK Singles Chart in November 1952.
- It was used as the title song for the 1953 film Walking My Baby Back Home, starring Donald O'Connor, Janet Leigh, Buddy Hackett, and Scatman Crothers. In the film, the song was performed by O'Connor.
- In 1962, Monica Zetterlund with Georg Riedel's Orchestra recorded a version of this song with Swedish lyrics by Beppe Wolgers entitled Sakta vi gå genom stan (lit. "Slowly we walk through the city"). It is a subtle tribute to Stockholm, and has in recent years been voted the most popular song about the Swedish capital (in a poll by Radio Stockholm). Zetterlund has had a Stockholm park named after her. The song was released on the Philips label.
- In 1967, Ronnie Dove covered the song for his album Cry.
- In 2008, Natalie Cole recorded the song as a virtual duet with her father and it was the first single for her album Still Unforgettable, released on September 9, 2008.
- Elvis Costello (with acoustic guitar) performed a version as an encore in his Auckland, New Zealand concert, January 19, 2013 and in Troy, New York on November 6, 2013.

== Other notable recorded versions ==
- John Allred
- Paul Anka
- Ray Anthony
- Louis Armstrong
- Hilde Lovise Asbjørnsen (No Vil Eg Vake Med Dig) Norwegian
- Les Baxter Orchestra and Chorus
- Tex Beneke and his Orchestra
- George Benson
- Ed Bickert
- Page Cavanaugh
- Chas & Dave
- Chubby Checker & Bobby Rydell
- Maurice Chevalier
- Eri Chiemi
- Freddy Cole
- Nat King Cole Penthouse Serenade
- Bing Crosby
- Sammy Davis Jr. The Nat King Cole Songbook, (1965).
- Craig Douglas
- Cliff "Ukulele Ike" Edwards
- Les Elgart and his Orchestra
- Lionel Ferbos
- Ella Fitzgerald
- Tennessee Ernie Ford
- The Four Freshmen
- Judy Garland
- Fei Ge
- Stéphane Grappelli
- Lionel Hampton
- Annette Hanshaw
- Coleman Hawkins
- Dick Haymes
- Woody Herman
- Dan Hicks
- Earl Hines
- Art Hodes
- Laurence James
- Elliot Lawrence
- Gisele MacKenzie
- Dean Martin
- Billy May and his Orchestra
- Dave McKenna
- Van Morrison
- Ronald Muldrow
- Willie Nelson
- Joe Pass
- Bob and Alf Pearson
- Dave Pell Octet
- Ray Pennington
- Bent Persson
- Oscar Peterson
- John Pizzarelli
- Bill Ramsey
- Nelson Riddle and his Orchestra
- Jimmy Roselli
- Tommy Sands
- Don Shirley
- James Taylor
- Livingston Taylor
- Jerry Vale
- Leroy Vinnegar Sextet
- Washboard Rhythm Kings
- Faron Young

== Use in media ==
- In the opening of the 2002 TV film Martin and Lewis, Dean Martin (played by Jeremy Northam) performs the song at the Riobamba Club in New York City.
