= Too Marvelous for Words =

1937 popular song by Richard Whiting and Johnny Mercer

Song
- Published: 1937
- Genre: Traditional pop
- Composer: Richard Whiting
- Lyricist: Johnny Mercer

"Too Marvelous for Words" is a popular song written in 1937. Johnny Mercer wrote the lyrics for music composed by Richard Whiting. It was introduced by Wini Shaw and Ross Alexander in the 1937 Warner Brothers film Ready, Willing, and Able, as well as used for a production number in a musical revue on Broadway. The song has become a pop and jazz standard and has been recorded by many artists.

== Overview ==
The song was used as the love theme for the characters played by Lauren Bacall and Humphrey Bogart in the 1947 film noir Dark Passage, directed by Delmer Daves. It was introduced in a vocal version (often erroneously credited, without verification, to Jo Stafford), then recurred as an instrumental at important points in the story. Harry James recorded a version in 1947 on Columbia 37851.

Alec Wilder has praised the song as a "model of pop songwriting, musically and lyrically". He cited its surprising shifts in rhythm and key.

The lyrics have won praise as sophisticated and perfectly synchronized with the tune. In the opinion of at least one critic, Mercer borrowed some of the lyric techniques and wordplay from Ira Gershwin. Singer Margaret Whiting was the daughter of composer Whiting and a good friend of lyricist Mercer. She said that Mercer's lyrics in "Too Marvelous for Words" were an enormously original approach to saying "I love you, honey".

== Recordings ==
Bing Crosby recorded the song on March 3, 1937 with Jimmy Dorsey for Decca Records and it went to the top of the charts of the day during ten weeks in the listings. Leo Reisman and his Orchestra also had chart success with the song in 1937, briefly reaching the No. 16 spot.

== Other recordings ==
Other artists who have recorded the song include:

- Pat Boone
- June Christy - Too Marvelous For Words (1986), Through the Years (1995), June Christy with The Johnny Guarnieri Quintet, A Friendly Session, Vol. 3 (1998)
- Rosemary Clooney - Clap Hands! Here Comes Rosie! (1960)
- Nat King Cole as a bonus track for - Penthouse Serenade (1952)
- Doris Day (on the 1950 soundtrack album Young Man with a Horn, an alternate version by Day with a string orchestra appears in the film)
- Michael Feinstein on his album Forever (1993)
- Ella Fitzgerald for her Ella Fitzgerald Sings the Johnny Mercer Song Book (1964)
- Stan Getz - Too Marvelous For Words 1950 (2001)
- Billie Holiday - Lady Sings the Blues (1956)
- Joni James on her album Joni Sings Sweet (1959)
- Diana Krall on her album Quiet Nights (2009)
- Frankie Laine for his 1959 album Reunion in Rhythm
- Jeri Southern - The Southern Style (1955)
- John Pizzarelli - Dear Mr. Cole (1994)
- Johnnie Ray - Til Morning (1958)
- Andy Russell with Dean Elliott and His Orchestra - Loves Notes From Andy Russell (1948)
- Frank Sinatra covered the song on his 1956 album Songs for Swingin' Lovers!, arranged by the Nelson Riddle Orchestra. He continued to perform the song on his 1962 world tour and performed it with a new arrangement by the Count Basie Band in 1965.
- Jo Stafford (1943)
- Frankie Vaughan
- Van Johnson and June Allyson in the MGM film Remains to Be Seen (film) (1953)

== See also ==
- Tin Pan Alley
- Musical theatre
