= Shrimp Boats =

1951 song

"Shrimp Boats" was a popular song in the 1950s.

It was written by Paul Mason Howard and Paul Weston and published in 1951. The original sheet music was arranged by Hawley Ades.

Charting versions were recorded by Jo Stafford (Weston's wife) and Dolores Gray. It was also recorded by Claude Gray (a country music singer) in 1963, and by Pete Fountain, Abdullah Ibrahim, The Orioles, and Buddy Tate.

The recording by Jo Stafford was made in July 1951 and released by Columbia Records as catalog number 39581, with the flip side "Love, Mystery, and Adventure". It first reached the Billboard chart on November 9, 1951, and lasted for 17 weeks on the chart, peaking at number 2.

The recording by Dolores Gray was released by Decca Records as catalog number 27832, with the flip side "More! More! More!" It first reached the Billboard chart on November 30, 1951, and lasted 6 weeks on the chart, peaking at number 25. A British version was recorded by Billy Cotton and his band, also in 1951. A Yiddish parody by Mickey Katz, entitled "Herring Boats", was also recorded.

== Court case ==
In 1952, bandleader Ben Pollack filed a suit against Paul Weston, Mason Howard, and the publishers, Disney Music, alleging that the words of "Shrimp Boats" infringed his rights in relation to a non-copyrighted song, "The Cajun Song", which he claimed Weston had heard in 1945. A later case was brought against Disney Music by Harold Spina and Bob Russell, who claimed to have given the partial lyric to Fred Raphael at Disney Music. The suit was dismissed in January 1953.
