= I'll Be Seeing You (song) =

1938 song written by Sammy Fain and Irving Kahal

Song
- Published: 1938 by Marlo Music Corporation
- Composer: Sammy Fain
- Lyricist: Irving Kahal

"I'll Be Seeing You" is a popular song about missing a loved one, with music by Sammy Fain and lyrics by Irving Kahal. Published in 1938, it was inserted into the Broadway musical Right This Way, which closed after fifteen performances. The title of the 1944 film I'll Be Seeing You was taken from this song at the suggestion of the film's producer, Dore Schary. The song is included in the film's soundtrack.

== Background ==
A resemblance between the main tune's first four lines and a passage within the theme of the last movement of Gustav Mahler's Third Symphony (1896) was pointed out by Deryck Cooke in 1970.

== Recordings ==
- The earliest recording of the song was by Dick Todd in 1940 on the Bluebird label.
- The recording by Bing Crosby became a nostalgic wartime hit in 1944, reaching number one for the week of July 1.
- Frank Sinatra's version with Tommy Dorsey and His Orchestra from 1940 charted in 1944 and peaked at No. 4. A new recording of the song by Frank Sinatra was included in 1961's I Remember Tommy. This new version went to No. 12 on the Easy Listening chart and No. 58 on the Billboard Hot 100.
- A recording by the Poni-Tails reached number 87 on the Billboard Hot 100 for the week ending November 16, 1959.
- Dinah Shore and André Previn recorded the song in Dinah Sings, Previn Plays, (Capitol Records, 1960).
- Brenda Lee recorded the song as the final track of her 1962 album Sincerely, Brenda Lee, with the second verse spoken rather than sung. This version features as a significant recurring theme in the 2018 film Out of Blue.

== In popular culture ==
- Billie Holiday's 1944 recording of the song was the final transmission sent by NASA to the Opportunity rover on Mars when its mission ended in February 2019. Holiday's version was also featured in the 2004 film The Notebook, the 2014 film Before I Disappear, and the 2022 television series Severance.
- Norah Jones recorded a version in 2020 in support of the New York Restoration Project during the COVID-19 pandemic and released a video of the performance.
- Jimmy Durante's 1965 version of the song appears in the 2024 film Deadpool & Wolverine, heard when the title characters go through a sling ring.
- Dean Martin Recorded a Single of the song in 1964

On the final episode of The Tonight Show starring Johnny Carson which was aired on May 22 1992, Doc Severinsen and the NBC Orchestra closed the show with it, as it was one of Carson's favorite songs.
