= Day by Day (1945 song) =

1944 song by Axel Stodahl, Paul Weston and Sammy Cahn

Song
- Genre: Jazz
- Composers: Axel Stordahl, Paul Weston
- Lyricist: Sammy Cahn

"Day by Day" is a popular song with music by Axel Stordahl and Paul Weston and lyrics by Sammy Cahn.

The most famous versions of the song were recorded by singers such as Frank Sinatra (in 1946 and 1961), Jo Stafford (in 1953); Les Brown (with vocals by Doris Day), Johnny Long and his orchestra (1946 radio transcription with vocals by Francey Lane), Bing Crosby, and Mel Tormé and the Mel-Tones.

== Other cover versions ==
- The Four Freshmen (single, with orchestra conducted by Dick Reynolds, Capitol, 1955)
- Doris Day (Day by Day, with Paul Weston and His Music from Hollywood, Columbia, 1957)
- Vic Damone (Closer Than a Kiss, Columbia, 1958)
- Sarah Vaughan (Vaughan and Violins, Mercury, 1959)
- Shirley Horn (Embers and Ashes, Stere-O-Craft, 1960)
- Astrud Gilberto (The Shadow of Your Smile, Verve, 1965)
- Carmen McRae (Portrait of Carmen, 1967)
- Kimiko Kasai (Satin Doll, CBS/Sony, 1972) - with Gil Evans Orchestra
- Trudy Desmond (Tailor Made, 1991)
- Grady Tate (TNT - Grady Tate Sings, 1991)
- Stevie Holland (More Than Words Can Say, 2006)
- Eliane Elias (Bossa Nova Stories, 2008)
- Ernestine Anderson (A Song for You, 2009)
- Carol Welsman (Alone Together, 2015)
