= The Night We Called It a Day (song) =

1941 song by Matt Dennis and Tom Adair

"The Night We Called It a Day" is a popular song and jazz standard. The music was written by Matt Dennis, the lyrics by Tom Adair. The song was published in 1941.

One early recording of the song is notable in that it was Frank Sinatra's first solo recording (Bluebird 11463 in 1942). A review in Billboard called the recording "a sparkling example of song" with Sinatra's singing and Axel Stordahl's musical direction. Sinatra also made studio recordings of the song for Columbia records in 1947 and Capitol Records in 1957. On May 19, 2015, Bob Dylan sang it on the second-to-last episode of The Late Show with David Letterman.

== Recorded versions ==
- June Christy - Something Cool (various 1954–2001)
- Frank Sinatra - Where Are You? (1957), The Best of the Columbia Years (1943-1952) [Box Set] (1995, includes 1947 Columbia recording), The Essential Frank Sinatra with the Tommy Dorsey Orchestra [2-Disc] (2005, includes 1942 RCA recording)
- Chet Baker - Embraceable You (Pacific Jazz, recorded 1957, released 1995)
- Doris Day - Day by Night (1957)
- The Four Freshmen - 4 Freshmen and 5 Trumpets - (1957)
- Carmen McRae - Carmen for Cool Ones - (1958)
- Irene Kral - The Band and I - (1958)
- Chris Connor - Chris Craft (1958)
- Milt Jackson & John Coltrane - Bags & Trane (1959)
- Jimmy Owens & Kenny Barron - You Had Better Listen (1967)
- The Hi-Lo's - Now (1981), with Clare Fischer (piano, instrumental arrangements)
- Mark Murphy - Kerouac, Then and Now (1986)
- Bob Dylan - Shadows in the Night (2015)
