= Manhattan Serenade =

The popularity of Louis Alter's "Manhattan Serenade" (1928) was highlighted in Nancy Groce's book New York: Songs of the City (1999).

"Manhattan Serenade" was composed by Louis Alter in 1928, with lyrics by Howard Johnson. Alternate lyrics were written ca. 1942 by Harold Adamson. It was a hit record for swing era bandleaders Harry James (vocals by Helen Forrest) and Tommy Dorsey (vocals by Jo Stafford).

== Films ==
The song may be most familiar as the title theme of My Man Godfrey (1936), and as the music orchestrating Corleone family consigliere Tom Hagen's flight to Los Angeles in the 1972 classic The Godfather. Scott Bradley based his score for Mouse in Manhattan, a Tom and Jerry cartoon released in 1945, on this composition. Manhattan Serenade was also featured in Vertigo, the scene in which John 'Scottie' Ferguson is dancing with Judy; and it was featured in the 1940 musical Broadway Rhythm to back a routine by the dancers/contortionists The Ross Sisters.

== Radio ==
"Manhattan Serenade" was used as the theme for the 1930-1945 radio comedy Easy Aces in a transcription performed by an in-studio theatre organist. Later, it was transcribed for a quartet of organ, celeste, and two stringed instruments. A fully-orchestrated arrangement of the Serenade was used in the short-lived Easy Aces remake Mr. Ace and Jane.

== Recordings ==
In addition to the Dorsey/Stafford and James/Forrest recordings, "Manhattan Serenade" has been recorded by such artists as the Beau Hunks Saxophone Soctette, Earl Coleman, Billy Cotton, Joan Edwards, The Four Coins, Curtis Fuller, George Greeley, Andre Kostelanetz, Enoch Light, Mantovani, Lincoln Mayorga, Raymond Scott, Nat Shilkret, Dinah Shore, Morton Gould. Paul Whiteman and Caterina Valente (1964 - lyrics by Harold Adamson).
