= That's for Me =

Song composed by Richard Rodgers performed by Jo Stafford

Song
- Published: 1945
- Composer: Richard Rodgers
- Lyricist: Oscar Hammerstein II

"That's For Me" is a popular song, written by Richard Rodgers, with the lyrics by Oscar Hammerstein II. The song was published in 1945 and included in the 1945 version of the musical film State Fair.

Popular recordings in 1945 were made by Jo Stafford and Dick Haymes.

The recording by Dick Haymes was released by Decca Records as catalog number 18706. It first reached the Billboard Best Seller chart on October 25, 1945, and lasted 4 weeks on the chart, peaking at #6. The recording by Jo Stafford was released by Capitol Records as catalog number 213. It reached the Billboard Best Seller chart at #9 on November 8, 1945, its only week on the chart.

== Other versions ==
Other versions have been recorded by Julie London, Gordon MacRae, Pat Boone and Sammy Davis Jr..
