= There's No You =

"There's No You" is a popular song written by Harold S. Hopper better known as Hal Hopper with lyrics by Tom Adair. The song was first published in 1944.

Two of the best-known versions of the song were recorded in 1944 by Jo Stafford and Frank Sinatra. Stafford's version was recorded on December 13, 1944 and it reached No, 7 in the Billboard charts in 1945. Sinatra's first recording of the song was made on November 14, 1944.

== Other notable recordings ==
- Vic Damone (1955).
- Miles Davis - Blue Moods (1955)
- June Christy - The Misty Miss Christy (1956)
- Frank Sinatra - Where Are You (1957)
- Ray Charles - The Great Ray Charles (1957)
- Coleman Hawkins - The Genius of Coleman Hawkins (1957)
- Louis Armstrong - Louis Armstrong Meets Oscar Peterson (1957)
- Johnny Mathis - for his album Johnny's Mood (1960)
- Sarah Vaughan - Close to You (1960)
- Ella Fitzgerald, Joe Pass, Speak Love (1983)
- Diana Krall - This Dream of You (2020)
