= I Love You (Cole Porter song) =

1944 original show tune by Cole Porter

"I Love You" is a song written by Cole Porter in 1944 for his stage musical Mexican Hayride.

== Background ==
The New York Times reviewed the show, saying, among other things: "Of Mr. Porter's score, the best number bears the title almost startling in its forthrightness, "I Love You," and is the property of Mr. Evans" (Wilbur Evans).

However, the rather generic lyrics of the song were due to a challenge given by Porter. His friend Monty Woolley contended that Porter's talent lay in the off-beat and the esoteric, maintaining that he could never take a cliché title like "I Love You" and write lyrics that included the banal sentiment: "It's spring again, and birds on the wing again" and be successful. Porter accepted the challenge with the result that the song eventually topped the hit parade. Porter remarked that the "superior melody overcame the ordinary lyric".

In 1945, Ira B. Arnstein sued Cole Porter for plagiarizing his work and filed a suit in the Federal Court. He had for twenty years been suing various songwriters and was considered to be a little eccentric. He claimed that Porter had stolen four songs: "I Love You", "Don't Fence Me In", "Begin the Beguine" and "You'd Be So Nice to Come Home To". A jury dismissed the charges, and the judge, moreover, awarded Porter $2,500 ($45,154 in 2022 terms) in legal costs—a sum that, since Arnstein couldn't pay it, kept him from any chance of prevailing in a federal court for the rest of his life.

It is not to be confused with an earlier song called "I Love You"— lyrics by Harlan Thompson and music by Harry Archer—written for the 1923 musical Little Jessie James.

== First recordings ==
It was recorded by Bing Crosby on February 11, 1944 and topped the Billboard charts for five weeks during an 18-week stay. Other charted versions were by Tommy Tucker, Enric Madriguera, Jo Stafford and Perry Como.

== Other recordings ==
It has become a popular jazz standard tune, along with pop music. Amongst others with recordings by:

- Bing Crosby - Bing Crosby Sings Cole Porter Songs (1949).
- Oscar Peterson - Oscar Peterson Plays Cole Porter (1953).
- Jackie McLean - Swing, Swang, Swingin' (1960).
- John Coltrane - Lush Life (1961).
- Art Pepper - Intensity (1963).
- Keith Jarrett - The Out-of-Towners (2004)

== Other media ==
- Barbra Streisand performed several lines in her "Color Me Barbra Medley" from the TV special and the album Color Me Barbra.
