= No Other Love (Bob Russell and Paul Weston song) =

Popular song performed by Jo Stafford

"No Other Love" is a 1950 pop song, lyrics by Bob Russell, music credited to Paul Weston.

== Background ==
The words were written by Bob Russell. The music is credited to Paul Weston, however, it is derived from Frédéric Chopin's Étude No. 3 in E, Op. 10, and is nearly identical to that of the song "Tristesse," a 1939 hit for French singer-actor Tino Rossi.

== Versions ==
A version recorded by Jo Stafford (Weston's wife) with Weston's orchestra backing her (released by Capitol Records as catalog number 1053), reached #8 on the Billboard chart in 1950. The piano artistry of George Greeley is also credited on the recording. This version of the song was featured in the trailers and final soundtrack for Paul Thomas Anderson's 2012 film, The Master.

Belle Gonzalez recorded a cover version that sold several million copies in the Philippines.

The Ambassadors of Harmony men's barbershop chorus won the Barbershop Harmony Society 2012 Chorus Championship, singing an a cappella arrangement.
