= The Trolley Song =

1944 song by Judy Garland and Georgie Stoll Orchestra

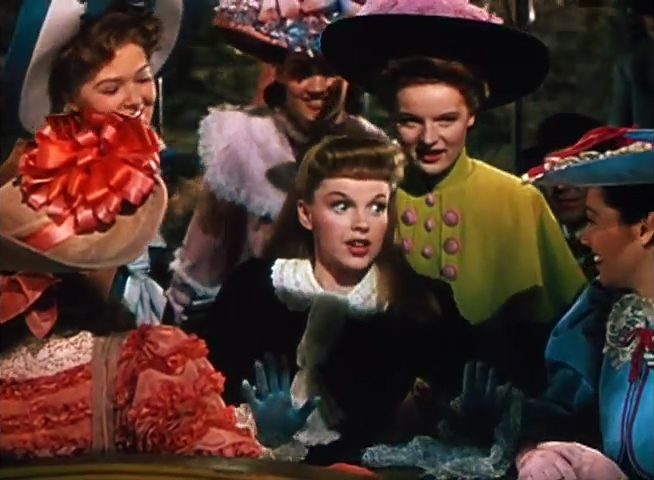
- Judy Garland and chorus perform "The Trolley Song" in Meet Me in St. Louis

Song by Judy Garland & Georgie Stoll Orchestra
- B-side: "Boys and Girls Like You"
- Released: October 1944
- Recorded: April 21, 1944
- Studio: Decca Studios, Los Angeles, California
- Length: 2:50
- Label: Decca 23361
- Composer: Hugh Martin
- Lyricist: Ralph Blane

"The Trolley Song" is a song by Judy Garland from the 1944 film Meet Me in St. Louis. Its lyrics were written by Ralph Blane with composition from Hugh Martin. "The Trolley Song" was nominated for Best Original Song at the 1945 Academy Awards but lost to "Swinging on a Star" from Going My Way. The song has been used in Walt Disney World's Magic Kingdom theme park in Florida as one of the core soundtrack numbers for the dance performances during the Main Street Trolley Show.

== Background ==
In a 1989 NPR interview, Blane and Martin reminisced about the song's genesis. They were assigned to write a song for the trolley scene in the film. Their first three efforts were rejected by producer Arthur Freed because, as Blane came to realize, Freed wanted something specifically about a trolley and not just a generic love song for Judy Garland's character in that scene.

In search of ideas, Blane went to the Beverly Hills Public Library and rummaged through turn-of-the-century newspapers to learn more about trolleys in the time period of the St. Louis World's Fair. He finally found a picture of a double-decker trolley with the caption, "Clang, clang, here comes the trolley." Blane showed the picture to Martin and told him, "Hugh, look at this. And Hugh said, clang, clang, clang went the trolley, and about - it was very few minutes, he had the whole thing going. In fact, it didn't take long to write that song at all once we got the first line." Three hours later they played it for Freed who said, "now, that's what I wanted all the time."

"The Trolley Song" was recorded on April 21, 1944, at Decca Studios on Melrose Avenue, Los Angeles, California. The song as conducted by Georgie Stoll for Meet Me in St. Louis has a complex, evocative arrangement by Conrad Salinger featuring harmonized choruses, wordless vocals, and short highlights or flourishes from a wide range of orchestral instruments.

== Legacy ==
=== Rankings ===
- "The Trolley Song" was ranked #26 by the American Film Institute in 2004 on the AFI's 100 Years...100 Songs list.

=== Covers ===
- Five versions of the song charted in 1944–45. Garland's single and a version by the Vaughn Monroe Orchestra—sung as a duet by Monroe and Marilyn Duke—both peaked at number four, but the biggest hit version was by the Pied Pipers, which reached number two on Billboard magazine's "Best Selling Retail Records" chart the week of December 16, 1944.
- Frank Sinatra covered the song on live radio performances in 1944 and 1945, including once as part of a duet with Eileen Barton. A 1944 cover he did was included in the CD release, Frank Sinatra – A Voice in Time 1939-1952.
- Instrumental versions of the song were used in the scores of Scott Bradley-arranged MGM animated shorts. Among them were Swing Shift Cinderella (1945) and Tom and Jerry cartoons, e.g., Cat Fishin' (1947).
- Numerous jazz instrumental interpretations have been released, such as the one by the Dave Brubeck Quartet in March 1954. The quartet recorded another version in 1962, featuring Paul Desmond on alto sax, and included it on the Bossa Nova U.S.A. album. The distinctive structure of "The Trolley Song"—in which the end of the second and third verses introduce a new melodic line and simulate the feeling that the song is taking off like the accelerating motion of a trolley, or like the dizzying sensation of falling in love—lends itself to jazz improvisation.
- A cover of the song was featured on Season 6 of the TV show Glee. In Episode 10, "The Rise and Fall of Sue Sylvester", the song is performed by the characters Doris and Sue.
- In 2021, Randy Rainbow covered the song in a political parody video called "Clang Clang Clang went Josh Hawley", about Missouri Senator Josh Hawley.

=== In popular culture ===
- In The Simpsons episode "Burns' Heir", Martin Prince sings the song for Mr. Burns, before being punched down by Nelson Muntz.
- At the end of The Simpsons Halloween episode "Treehouse of Horror X", "The Trolley Song" is sung by Rosie O'Donnell.

== See also ==
- List of train songs
