= Candy (1944 song) =

Popular song

"Candy" is a popular song. The music was written by Alex Kramer, the lyrics by Mack David and Joan Whitney. It was published in 1944.

== First recordings ==
A recording by Johnny Mercer and the Pied Pipers, with Jo Stafford, was released by Capitol Records as catalog number 183. It first reached the Billboard magazine Best Seller chart on February 22, 1945, and lasted 15 weeks on the chart, peaking at #2. Mercer recalled that the song was ideal for his limited range for ballad singing.

Another recording by Dinah Shore was released by RCA Victor Records as catalog number 20-1632. It reached the Billboard magazine Best Seller chart on April 5, 1945, at No. 10, its only week on the chart.

== Radio ==
Popular songs, like "Candy", would also be performed in different novelty arrangements live on the radio by the studio orchestras of the time, particularly on network radio shows such as Fibber McGee and Molly's Billy Mills orchestra.

It was used as the theme song to the radio drama Candy Matson, YUkon 2-8209.

== Later recordings ==
Big Maybelle's version of the song went to No. 11 on the Billboard R&B chart in 1956 and received the Grammy Hall of Fame Award in 1999. the Manhattan Transfer and Chet Baker both recorded covers.
