= It Could Happen to You (song) =

1943 song

"It Could Happen to You" is a popular standard with music by Jimmy Van Heusen and lyrics by Johnny Burke. The song was written in 1943 and was introduced by Dorothy Lamour in the Paramount musical comedy film And the Angels Sing (1944).

A recording by Jo Stafford made on December 13, 1943, was released by Capitol Records as catalog number 158. It reached the Billboard Best Seller chart on September 21, 1944, at number 10, its only week on the chart. Bing Crosby's recording for Decca Records, made on December 29, 1943, had two weeks in the Billboard charts in September 1944, with a peak position of number 18.

The Dexter Gordon composition "Fried Bananas" is based on the chord progression of "It Could Happen to You".

== Other notable recordings ==
The song has also been recorded by Esther Phillips, Etta James, Etta Jones, Anita O'Day, Eydie Gormé, Frankie Vaughan, Ryo Fukui, Masaru Imada, Kimiko Kasai, Julie London, Lena Horne, Lita Roza, Peggy Lee, Perry Como, Sarah Vaughan, Tony Bennett, Vera Lynn, Shirley Bassey, Miles Davis, Chet Baker, Bud Powell, Ahmad Jamal, Art Garfunkel, Frank Sinatra, Doris Day, Rosemary Clooney, Keith Jarrett, Sonny Clark, Diana Krall, Barry Manilow, Johnny Mathis, Nat King Cole, Susannah McCorkle, Dinah Washington, Barbra Streisand, Dave Brubeck and Laufey.
