= Serenade of the Bells =

Single by Sammy Kaye Orchestra
- Released: 1947
- Genre: Popular
- Length: 3:12
- Label: RCA
- Songwriters: Kay Twomey, Al Goodhart, Al Urbano

"Serenade of the Bells" is a popular song written by Kay Twomey, Al Goodhart, and Al Urbano and published in 1947.

The recording by the Sammy Kaye Orchestra with vocal by Don Cornell was released by RCA Victor as catalog number 20-2372. It first reached the Billboard magazine Best Seller chart on November 7, 1947 and lasted 16 weeks on the chart, peaking at #3.

Another version was recorded by Jo Stafford and released by Capitol Records ECJ-500064 1950 ~53 as catalog number 15007. It first reached the Billboard magazine Best Seller chart on December 12, 1947 and lasted 9 weeks on the chart, peaking at #6.

The recording by the Kay Kyser Orchestra was released on Columbia 37956. It reached the Billboard magazine Best Seller chart on December 26, 1947 at #13, its only week on the chart.

A cover version by Gracie Fields with Phil Green and his orchestra was issued as a 78 rpm single on Decca in the UK.
