= Jo Stafford discography =

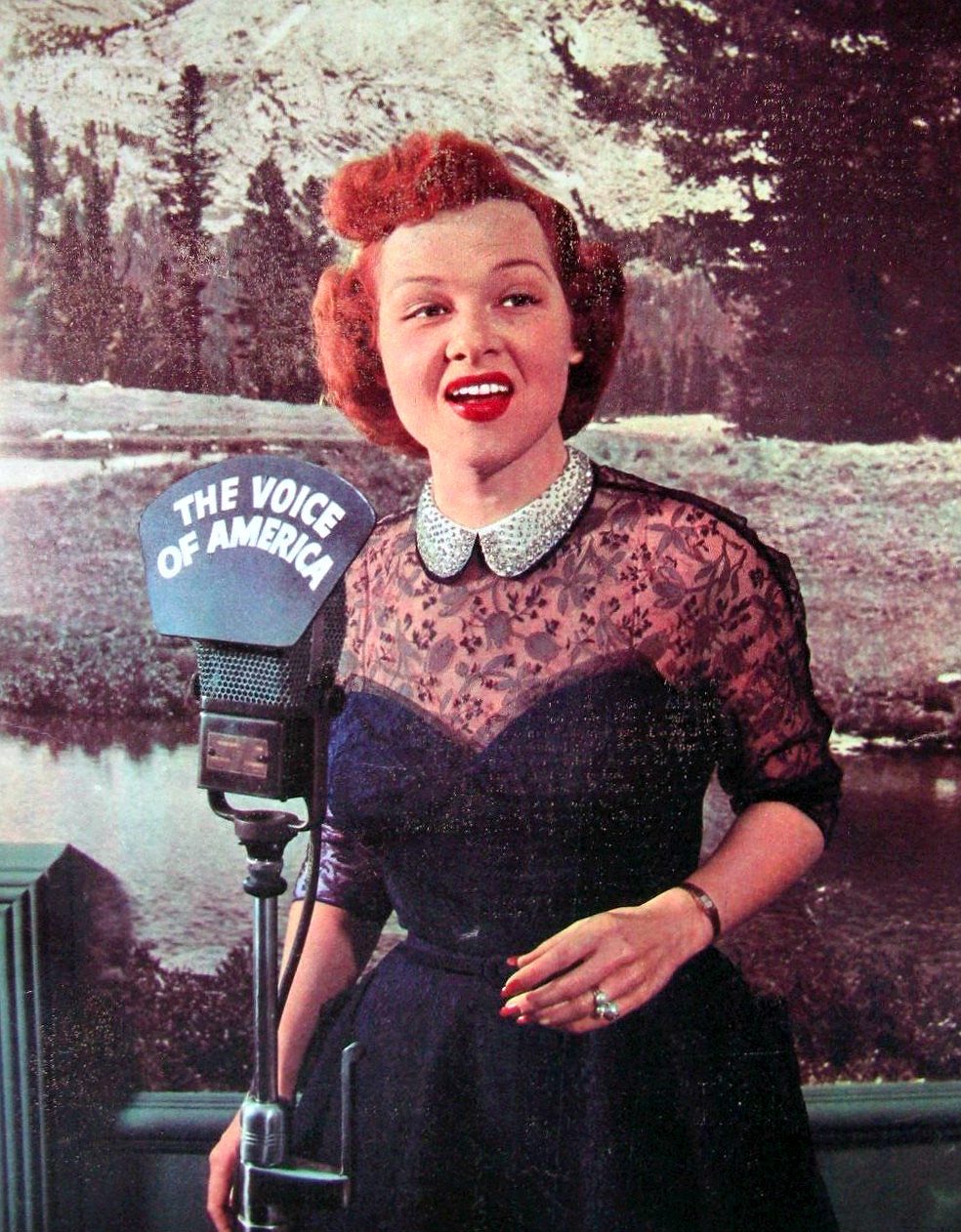
- Jo Stafford performing in 1951.
- Studio albums: 26
- Compilation albums: 26
- Promotional singles: 4
- Lead artist singles: 112
- Collaborative singles: 42
- Other charted songs: 17

The discography of American singer Jo Stafford contains 26 studio albums, 26 compilation albums, 112 singles as a lead artist, 42 singles as a collaborative artist, four promotional singles and 17 other charted songs. Her first-issued recordings were released in the mid 1940s, beginning with the US top 20 song, "Old Acquaintance". It was followed by her first US top song (and first number one Australian song), "Long Ago (and Far Away)". Nine more of Stafford's solo singles made the US top ten during the 1940s including "Day by Day" (1945), "Serenade of the Bells" (1947) and "Some Enchanted Evening" (1949). As a collaborative recording artist, Stafford first teamed with The Pied Pipers on the 1945 US top ten single, "The Trolley Song". During the decade, she also collaborated with Johnny Mercer, Red Ingle and Gordon MacRae. With Mercer, she topped the US chart (and reached the top 20 on the Australian chart) with "Candy" (1945). With Ingle, she topped the US chart with "Temptation (Tim-Tay-Shun)" (1947). With MacRae, Stafford reached the US top ten four times, including the number one single, "My Darling, My Darling" (1948).

Stafford had nine US top ten singles during the 1950s including "Tennessee Waltz" (1951), "Shrimp Boats" (1951) and "Keep It a Secret" (1952). Among her most successful solo releases was 1952's "You Belong to Me", which the topped charts in the US, Australia and the United Kingdom. It was followed by another US number-one single in 1953 titled "Make Love to Me". Her solo releases continued making the US and Australian charts through 1959. Collaboratively, Stafford joined Frankie Laine on nine singles during the decade. This included the US top ten songs "Hey, Good Lookin'" (1951) and "Hambone" (1952). Other collaborative singles included "Indiscretion" (a duet with Liberace) and "Good Nite" (a duet with Vic Damone). As one half of the comedic duo, Jonathan and Darlene Edwards, a 1967 cover of the song "Carioca" was issued as a single.

Between 1948 and 1950, Capitol Records issued five studio albums of Stafford's music. This began with American Folk Songs (1948), followed by two collaborative releases with Gordon MacRae: Kiss Me, Kate (1949) and Sunday Evening Songs (1950). Columbia Records then released 15 studio albums by Stafford during the 1950s. This began with As You Desire Me (1953) and later included My Heart's in the Highlands (1954), Soft and Sentimental (1955), A Gal Named Jo (1956) and Swingin' Down Broadway (1958). The label also issued two studio albums by Stafford as one half of Jonathan and Darlene Edwards: The Piano Artistry of Jonathan Edwards (1957) and Jonathan and Darlene Edwards in Paris (1960). Among her last studio releases were several albums issued in 1960s, including two 1966 Dot-label releases: Do I Hear a Waltz? and This Is Jo Stafford. Her final studio album was 1982's Darlene Remembers Duke, Jonathan Plays Fats.

== Albums ==
=== Studio albums ===
List of studio albums, showing all relevant details
Title	Album details
American Folk Songs	Released: May 1948; Label: Capitol; Formats: LP
Kiss Me, Kate (with Gordon MacRae)	Released: April 1949; Label: Capitol; Formats: LP
Autumn in New York	Released: March 1950; Label: Capitol; Formats: LP
Sunday Evening Songs (with Gordon MacRae)	Released: November 1950; Label: Capitol; Formats: LP
Songs of Faith	Released: October 1950; Label: Capitol; Formats: LP
As You Desire Me	Released: June 1952; Label: Columbia; Formats: LP
Broadway's Best	Released: January 1953; Label: Columbia; Formats: LP
Garden of Prayer	Released: May 1954; Label: Columbia; Formats: LP
My Heart's in the Highlands	Released: 1954; Label: Columbia; Formats: LP
A Musical Portrait of New Orleans (with Frankie Laine)	Released: August 1954; Label: Columbia; Formats: LP
Soft and Sentimental	Released: October 1955; Label: Columbia; Formats: LP
Happy Holiday	Released: November 1955; Label: Columbia; Formats: LP
A Gal Named Jo	Released: 1956; Label: Columbia; Formats: LP
Ski Trails	Released: November 1956; Label: Columbia; Formats: LP
The Piano Artistry of Jonathan Edwards (as Jonathan and Darlene Edwards)	Released: 1957; Label: Columbia; Formats: LP
Once Over Lightly	Released: March 1957; Label: Columbia; Formats: LP
Songs of Scotland	Released: October 1957; Label: Columbia; Formats: LP
Swingin' Down Broadway	Released: March 1958; Label: Columbia; Formats: LP
I'll Be Seeing You	Released: February 1959; Label: Columbia; Formats: LP
Ballad of the Blues	Released: October 1959; Label: Columbia; Formats: LP
Jo + Jazz	Released: November 1960; Label: Columbia; Formats: LP
Jonathan and Darlene Edwards in Paris (as Jonathan and Darlene Edwards)	Released: 1961; Label: Columbia; Formats: LP
Getting Sentimental over Tommy Dorsey	Released: June 1963; Label: Reprise; Formats: LP
Do I Hear a Waltz?	Released: January 1966; Label: Dot; Formats: LP
This Is Jo Stafford	Released: September 1966; Label: Dot; Formats: LP
Darlene Remembers Duke, Jonathan Plays Fats (as Jonathan and Darlene Edwards)	Released: 1982; Label: Corinthian; Formats: LP

=== Compilation albums ===
List of compilation albums, showing all relevant details
Title	Album details
Starring Jo Stafford	Released: 1953; Label: Capitol; Formats: LP
Memory Songs (with Gordon MacRae)	Released: 1955; Label: Capitol; Formats: LP
Jo's Greatest Hits	Released: November 1958; Label: Columbia; Formats: LP
Whispering Hope (with Gordon MacRae)	Released: March 1962; Label: Capitol; Formats: LP
Peace in the Valley (with Gordon MacRae)	Released: June 1963; Label: Capitol; Formats: LP
The Hits of Jo Stafford	Released: January 1964; Label: Capitol; Formats: LP
Jo Stafford's Sweet Hour of Prayer	Released: March 1964; Label: Capitol; Formats: LP
The Joyful Season	Released: October 1964; Label: Capitol; Formats: LP
Jo Stafford's Greatest Hits	Released: May 1968; Label: Decca; Formats: LP
The Jo Stafford Story	Released: 1971; Label: Capitol; Formats: LP
Stars of the Fifties	Released: 1971; Label: Capitol; Formats: LP
Four Great Ladies of Song (with Doris Day, Dinah Shore and Rosemary Clooney)	Released: 1975; Label: Columbia; Formats: LP
Jo Stafford	Released: 1986; Label: Time Life/Capitol; Formats: LP
Capitol Collectors Series	Released: March 18, 1991; Label: Capitol; Formats: CD
Fabulous Song Stylists	Released: 1991; Label: Sony; Formats: CD
The Duets (with Frankie Laine	Released: 1992; Label: Bear Family; Formats: CD
Greatest Hits	Released: 1993; Label: Curb; Formats: CD
16 Most Requested Songs	Released: May 18, 1995; Label: Sony; Formats: CD
The One and Only Jo Stafford	Released: 1995; Label: EMI; Formats: CD
Spotlight on...Jo Stafford	Released: January 23, 1996; Label: Capitol; Formats: CD, cassette
V-Disc Recordings, Jo Stafford	Released: August 18, 1998; Label: Collectors' Choice; Formats: CD
Jo & Friends	Released: January 1, 2000; Label: Sony; Formats: CD
The Magic of Jo Stafford	Released: March 13, 2001; Label: EMI; Formats: CD
The Ultimate Jo Stafford	Released: August 27, 2002; Label: EMI; Formats: CD
The Best of Jo Stafford	Released: April 1, 2003; Label: EMI; Formats: CD
Ultimate Capitol Collection	Released: June 4, 2007; Label: EMI; Formats: CD

== Singles ==
=== As lead artist ===
List of lead singles, with selected chart positions, showing other relevant details
Title	Year	Peak chart positions				Album
Title	Year	US	US Cou.	AUS	UK	Album
"Old Acquaintance"	1943	15	—	—	—	non-album singles
"Long Ago (and Far Away)"	1944	6	—	1	—	non-album singles
"Too Marvelous for Words"	1944	—	—	—	—	non-album singles
"It Could Happen to You"	1944	10	—	1	—	non-album singles
"Let's Take the Long Way Home"	1945	14	—	—	—	non-album singles
"There's No You"	1945	7	—	—	—	non-album singles
"On the Sunny Side of the Street"	1945	17	—	—	—	non-album singles
"That's for Me"	1945	—	—	—	—	non-album singles
"Day by Day"	1945	8	—	—	—	non-album singles
"You May Not Love Me"	1946	—	—	—	—	non-album singles
"Cindy"	1946	—	—	—	—	non-album singles
"This Is Always"	1946	11	—	—	—	non-album singles
"You Keep Coming Back Like a Song"	1946	11	—	—	—	non-album singles
"This Time"	1946	—	—	—	—	non-album singles
"White Christmas"	1946	9	—	—	—	non-album singles
"Sonata"	1946	10	—	—	—	non-album singles
"September Song"	1947	—	—	—	—	non-album singles
"Give Me Something to Dream About"	1947	—	—	—	—	non-album singles
"Ivy"	1947	13	—	—	—	non-album singles
"Smoke Dreams"	1947	—	—	—	—	non-album singles
"I'm So Right Tonight"	1947	21	—	—	—	non-album singles
"Feudin' and Fightin'"	1947	7	5	—	—	non-album singles
"The Stanley Steamer"	1947	11	—	—	—	non-album singles
"Serenade of the Bells"	1947	6	—	—	—	non-album singles
"I Never Loved Anyone"	1947	23	—	—	—	non-album singles
"Haunted Heart"	1948	23	—	—	—	non-album singles
"It's Monday Every Day"	1948	—	—	—	—	non-album singles
"Suspicion"	1948	23	—	—	—	non-album singles
"Better Luck Next Time"	1948	23	—	—	—	non-album singles
"Every Day I Love You (Just a Little Bit More)"	1948	25	—	—	—	non-album singles
"Baby Won't You Please Come Home"	1948	—	—	—	—	non-album singles
"In the Still of the Night"	1948	—	—	—	—	non-album singles
"Smilin' Through"	1948	—	—	—	—	non-album singles
"Congratulations"	1948	13	—	—	—	non-album singles
"Funny Little Money Man"	1949	—	—	—	—	non-album singles
"Always True to You in My Fashion"	1949	—	—	—	—	non-album singles
"Begin the Beguine"	1949	—	—	—	—	non-album singles
"Once and for Always"	1949	16	—	—	—	non-album singles
"Some Enchanted Evening"	1949	4	—	—	—	non-album singles
"Just One Way to Say I Love You"	1949	12	—	—	—	non-album singles
"Ragtime Cowboy Joe"	1949	10	—	—	—	non-album singles
"If I'll Ever Love Again"	1949	20	—	—	—	non-album singles
"Scarlet Ribbons (For Her Hair)"	1949	14	—	—	—	non-album singles
"I Wonder as I Wander"	1949	—	—	—	—	American Folk Songs
"Fools Rush In"	1950	—	—	—	—	non-album singles
"Diamonds Are a Girl's Best Friend"	1950	30	—	—	—	non-album singles
"When April Comes Again"	1950	—	—	—	—	non-album singles
"Tumbling Tumbleweeds"	1950	—	—	—	—	non-album singles
"On the Outgoing Tide"	1950	—	—	—	—	non-album singles
"Play a Simple Melody"	1950	18	—	—	—	non-album singles
"No Other Love"	1950	10	—	—	—	non-album singles
"Goodnight, Irene" (c/w "Our Very Own")	1950	26	—	—	—	non-album singles
"La Vie en Rose"	1950	—	—	—	—	non-album singles
"Autumn Leaves"	1950	—	—	—	—	Autumn in New York
"It Was So Beautiful (And You Were Mine)"	1950	—	—	—	—	non-album singles
"Use Your Imagination"	1950	—	—	—	—	non-album singles
"Stardust"	1950	—	—	—	—	non-album singles
"If You've Got the Money, I've Got the Time"	1950	14	—	—	—	non-album singles
"If"	1951	8	—	1	—	non-album singles
"Tennessee Waltz"	1951	7	—	1	—	non-album singles
"The Handsome Stranger"	1951	—	—	—	—	non-album singles
"Lovely Is the Evening"	1951	—	—	—	—	non-album singles
"Along the Colorado Trail"	1951	—	—	—	—	non-album singles
"Somebody"	1951	12	—	—	—	non-album singles
"Kissin' Bug Boogie"	1951	—	—	—	—	non-album singles
"Shrimp Boats"	1951	2	—	2	—	A Musical Portrait of New Orleans
"A-Round the Corner"	1952	9	—	1	—	non-album single
"Raminay! (The New Orleans Chimney Sweep)"	1952	—	—	—	—	A Musical Portrait of New Orleans
"You Belong to Me"	1952	1	—	1	1	non-album single
"Jambalaya"	1952	3	—	7	11	A Musical Portrait of New Orleans
"Keep It a Secret"	1952	4	—	3	—	non-album singles
"Now and Then There's a Fool Such as I"	1953	16	—	—	—	non-album singles
"Without My Lover"	1953	27	—	—	—	non-album singles
"Just Another Polka"	1953	22	—	7	—	non-album singles
"Someone's Been Reading My Mail"	1953	—	—	—	—	non-album singles
"Cup of Joy"	1953	—	—	—	—	non-album singles
"I Found a Friend"	1953	—	—	—	—	Garden of Prayer
"Christmas Blues"	1953	—	—	—	—	non-album singles
"Make Love to Me"	1953	1	—	9	8	non-album singles
"Thank You for Calling"	1954	12	—	—	—	non-album singles
"Nearer My Love to Me"	1954	—	—	—	—	non-album singles
"Teach Me Tonight"	1954	15	—	18	—	non-album singles
"Don't Get Around Much Anymore"	1954	—	—	—	—	non-album singles
"I Got a Sweetie"	1955	—	—	—	—	non-album singles
"Young and Foolish"	1955	—	—	8	—	non-album singles
"Ain'tcha-cha Comin' Out T-tonight?"	1955	—	—	—	—	non-album singles
"Suddenly There's a Valley"	1955	13	—	2	12	non-album singles
"It's Almost Tomorrow"	1955	14	—	8	—	non-album singles
"All Night Long"	1956	99	—	—	—	non-album singles
"Big D"	1956	—	—	—	—	non-album singles
"With a Little Bit of Luck"	1956	85	—	40	—	non-album singles
"Love Me Good"	1956	62	—	—	—	non-album singles
"On London Bridge"	1956	38	—	24	—	non-album singles
"Wind in the Willow"	1957	53	—	9	—	non-album singles
"I'll Be There (When You Get Lonely)"	1957	—	—	—	—	non-album singles
"Star of Love"	1957	—	—	—	—	non-album singles
"Echoes in the Night"	1957	—	—	—	—	non-album singles
"Sweet Little Darlin'"	1957	—	—	—	—	non-album singles
"I May Never Pass This Way Again"	1958	—	—	—	—	non-album singles
"Hibiscus"	1958	—	—	83	—	non-album singles
"How Can We Say Goodbye"	1959	—	—	—	—	non-album singles
"Pinetop's Boogie"	1959	— (Note: "Pinetop's Boogie" did not enter the Hot 100, but peaked at number five on Bubbling Under Hot 100 Singles, which acts as a 25-song extension of the Hot 100.)	—	—	—	non-album singles
"It's Been So Long"	1959	—	—	—	—	non-album singles
"Every Night When the Sun Goes In"	1960	—	—	—	—	Ballad of the Blues
"Happy Is the Word (For Love)"	1960	—	—	—	—	non-album singles
"Indoor Sport"	1960	—	—	—	—	non-album singles
"Misty"	1962	—	—	—	—	non-album singles
"If My Heart Had a Window"	1962	—	—	—	—	non-album singles
"Country Bumpkin"	1963	—	—	—	—	non-album singles
"Down in the Valley"	1965	—	—	—	—	Do I Hear a Waltz?
"Cry, Cry, Darling"	1966	—	—	—	—	This Is Jo Stafford
"Stayin' Alive" (as Darlene Edwards)	1979	—	—	—	—	non-album single
"—" denotes a recording that did not chart or was not released in that territory.

=== As a collaborative artist ===
List of collaborative singles, with selected chart positions, showing other relevant details
Title	Year	Peak chart positions			Album
Title	Year	US	US Cou.	AUS	Album
"The Trolley Song" (with The Pied Pipers)	1944	2	—	—	non-album singles
"Blues in the Night" (with Johnny Mercer)	1944	—	—	—	non-album singles
"I Didn't Know About You" (with The Pied Pipers)	1944	—	—	—	non-album singles
"Candy" (with Johnny Mercer)	1945	1	—	12	non-album singles
"Conversation While Dancing" (with Johnny Mercer)	1945	—	—	—	non-album singles
"Temptation (Tim-Tay-Shun)" (with Red Ingle and the Natural Seven)	1947	1	2	—	non-album singles
"Say Something Sweet to Your Sweetheart" (with Gordon MacRae and The Starlighters)	1948	10	—	—	non-album singles
"My Darling, My Darling" (with Gordon MacRae and The Starlighters)	1948	1	—	—	non-album singles
"Prisoner of Love's Song" (with Red Ingle's Natural Sevens)	1948	—	—	—	non-album singles
"The Pussy Cat Song (Nyot Nyaw)" (with Gordon MacRae)	1949	26	—	—	non-album singles
"'A' You're Adorable" (with Gordon MacRae)	1949	4	—	—	non-album singles
"My One and Only Highland Fling" (with Gordon MacRae)	1949	—	—	—	non-album singles
"Smiles (with Dave Lambert and His Choir)"	1949	—	—	—	non-album singles
"Whispering Hope" (with Gordon MacRae)	1949	4	—	—	non-album singles
"Bibbidi-Bobbidi-Boo" (with Gordon MacRae)	1949	13	—	—	non-album singles
"Songs of Christmas Medley" (with Gordon MacRae and Choir)	1949	—	—	—	non-album singles
"Dearie" (with Gordon MacRae)	1950	10	—	—	non-album singles
"Beyond the Sunset" (with Gordon MacRae)	1950	—	—	—	non-album singles
"Down the Lane" (with Gordon MacRae)	1950	—	—	—	non-album singles
"Where Are You Gonna Be When The Moon Shines" (with Gordon MacRae)	1950	—	—	—	non-album singles
"The Rosary" (with Gordon MacRae)	1950	—	—	—	non-album singles
"Tea for Two" (with Gordon MacRae)	1950	—	—	—	non-album singles
"I'll See You in Church After Sunday Morning" (with Gordon MacRae)	1950	—	—	—	non-album singles
"Hold Me, Hold Me" (with Gordon MacRae)	1950	—	—	—	non-album singles
"My Heart Cries for You" (with Gene Autry)	1951	—	—	1	non-album singles
"Pretty Eyed Baby" (with Frankie Laine)	1951	13	—	17	non-album singles
"With These Hands" (with Nelson Eddy)	1951	—	—	—	non-album singles
"When It's Spring Time in the Rockies" (with Gordon MacRae)	1951	—	—	—	non-album singles
"In the Cool, Cool, Cool of the Evening" (with Frankie Laine)	1951	17	—	2	non-album singles
"Star of Hope" (with the Lee Brothers)	1951	—	—	—	non-album singles
"Hey, Good Lookin'" (with Frankie Laine)	1951	9	—	15	non-album singles
"I Love You Truly" (with Nelson Eddy)	1951	—	—	—	non-album singles
"Hambone" (with Frankie Laine)	1952	6	—	—	non-album singles
"Tonight We're Setting the Woods on Fire" (with Frankie Laine)	1952	21	—	20	non-album singles
"Chow Willy" (with Frankie Laine)	1952	25	—	—	non-album singles
"'Way Down Yonder in New Orleans" (with Frankie Laine)	1953	26	—	—	A Musical Portrait of New Orleans
"Indiscretion" (with Liberace)	1954	30	—	—	non-album singles
"Goin' Like Wildfire" (with Frankie Laine)	1954	—	—	—	non-album singles
"High Society" (with Frankie Laine)	1954	—	—	—	non-album singles
"Let Me Hear You Whisper" (with David Hughes)	1955	—	—	—	non-album singles
"Good Nite" (with Vic Damone)	1957	—	—	43	non-album singles
"Carioca" (as Jonathan and Darlene Edwards)	1967	—	—	—	Songs For Sheiks & Flappers
"—" denotes a recording that did not chart or was not released in that territory.

=== Promotional singles ===
List of promotional singles, showing all relevant details
Title	Year	Album	Ref.
"I Only Have Eyes for You"	1954	non-album singles	
"It's Never Quite the Same"	1958	non-album singles	
"Blue Moon (From Make Believe Ballroom)"	2020	non-album singles	
"Monday, Tuesday, Wednesday (I Love You)" (with Gordon MacRae)	2021	non-album singles	

== Other charted songs ==
List of songs, with selected chart positions, showing other relevant details
Title	Year	Peak chart positions		Album	Notes
Title	Year	US	AUS	Album	Notes
"How Sweet You Are"	1944	14	—	non-album singles	(Note: B-side release to the single "Old Acquaintance".)
"I Love You"	1944	8	—	non-album singles	(Note: B-side release to the single "Long Ago (and Far Away)".)
"Out of This World"	1945	9	—	non-album singles	(Note: B-side release to the single, "There's No You".)
"Symphony"	1946	4	1	non-album singles	(Note: B-side release to the single, "Day by Day")
"The Things We Did Last Summer"	1946	10	—	non-album singles	(Note: B-side release to the single, "You Keep Coming Back Like a Song")
"A Sunday Kind of Love"	1947	15	—	non-album singles	(Note: B-side release to the single, "")
"Love and the Weather"	1947	25	—	non-album singles	(Note: B-side release to the single, "Feudin' and Fightin'".)
"The Gentleman Is a Dope"	1947	20	—	non-album singles	(Note: B-side release to the single, "Serenade of the Bells".)
"The Best Things in Life Are Free"	1948	21	—	non-album singles	(Note: B-side release to the single, "I Never Loved Anyone")
"I'm My Own Grandmaw"	1948	21	—	non-album singles	(Note: B-side release to the single, "Haunted Heart".)
"Here I'll Stay"	1949	28	—	non-album singles	(Note: B-side release to the single, "Congratulations".)
"Homework"	1949	11	—	non-album singles	(Note: B-side release to the single, "Just One Way to Say I Love You".)
"The Last Mile Home"	1949	16	—	non-album singles	(Note: B-side release to the single, "Ragtime Cowboy Joe".)
"Sometime"	1950	27	—	non-album singles	(Note: B-side release to the single, "No Other Love".)
"It Is No Secret"	1951	15	—	Garden of Prayer	(Note: B-side release to the single, "If".)
"Gambella (The Gamlin' Lady)" (with Frankie Laine)	1951	19	11	non-album singles	(Note: B-side release to the single, "Hey, Good Lookin'")
"Early Autumn"	1952	23	—	non-album singles	(Note: B-side release to the single, "")
"—" denotes a recording that did not chart or was not released in that territory.

== See also ==
- Jonathan and Darlene Edwards
- List of Jo Stafford compilation albums (1955–1999)
- List of Jo Stafford compilation albums (2000–2009)
- List of Jo Stafford compilation albums (2010–present)
