= Down in the Valley (folk song) =

American folk song

"Down in the Valley", also known as "Birmingham Jail", is a traditional American folk song. It has been recorded by many artists and is included in the Songs of Expanding America recordings in Burl Ives' six-album set Historical America in Song.

The verses mentioning "Birmingham Jail" refer to the Birmingham, Alabama, City Jail which was well-known in the mid-1920s, although the reference was often omitted in later versions. Guitarist Jimmie Tarlton claimed to have written the lyrics in 1925 while he was jailed in Birmingham for moonshining. It was first recorded by Tarlton and his partner Tom Darby on November 10, 1927, in Atlanta, Georgia, for Columbia Records. According to one biographer of the folk musician Lead Belly, he performed it for Texas Governor Pat Neff at the Sugarland Penitentiary in 1924.

The ballad is played in the 3/4 time signature. Lyrics vary, as with most folk songs. For example, sometimes the line "Hang your head over, hear the wind blow" is replaced by "Late in the evening, hear the train blow". In 1927, Darby and Tarlton sang "down in the levee" in place of "down in the valley"; the version sung by Lead Belly in 1934 substitutes "Shreveport jail" for "Birmingham jail".

Solomon Burke and Bert Berns borrowed some of the song's lyrics and melody for their own song of the same name. That song was covered by Otis Redding on his album Otis Blue/Otis Redding Sings Soul.

== Selected recordings ==
- Darby and Tarlton (1927, Columbia 15212D) – sold over 200,000 copies, one of Columbia's best-sellers at the time
- The Andrews Sisters recorded it in 1944 and their version briefly reached the Billboard charts. They had featured the song in the film Moonlight and Cactus (1944).
- Patti Page - a single release in 1951.
- Cisco Houston included his version of the songs in two of his albums.
- Bing Crosby included the song in a medley on his album 101 Gang Songs (1961)
- Connie Francis - included in her album Sing Along with Connie Francis (1961).
- Jo Stafford - for her album Do I Hear a Waltz? (1966)
- Slim Whitman - in his albums Love Song of the Waterfall (1965) and Cool Water (1968) and earlier, in 1949, as a 78-rpm side under the title "Birmingham Jail"
- Jerry Garcia and David Grisman, on the 1996 album Shady Grove

== In other media ==
This song is the basis of the 1945 Kurt Weill and Arnold Sundgaard opera Down in the Valley.

It was performed by Anne Baxter in the Wagon Train episode, “The Kitty Angel Story“ (1959).

It was performed by Joanna Moore on The Andy Griffith Show in 1962.

The author/songwriter David M. Pierce used selected lyrics from the song as titles for a series of detective novels written between 1989 and 1996: Down in the Valley, Hear the Wind Blow, Dear, Roses Love Sunshine, Angels in Heaven, Write Me a Letter and As She Rides By. The first four verses are featured in Catherine Marshall's novel, Christy, before the prologue.

It is sung in the movie Stir Crazy by the character Grossberger portrayed by Erland Van Lidth.

Jim and Anna sing the song in Tillie Olsen's novel Yonnondio: From the Thirties as they arrive in the Dakotas. The 3/4 time and melancholy of the song contrast with the hope they are feeling as they arrive there.

The song is performed by Ronny Cox (Ozark Bule) and David Carradine (Woody Guthrie) in the Academy Award winning film (Best Cinematography/Best Music-Score) Bound for Glory (biography of Woody Guthrie) in the scene that takes place in a migrant fruit pickers camp. http://www.halashby.co.uk/page18.html

It is also used in the movie Along the Great Divide starring Kirk Douglas, Walter Brennan, Virginia Mayo, and John Agar although it was written long after the time period set of the movie.

In the Star Trek: The Next Generation episode “Dark Page”, a mental projection of Deanna Troi's father sings the song, stating she could never fall asleep as a baby unless she heard it.

In The Ballad of Songbirds and Snakes by author Suzanne Collins, Lucy Gray Baird sings her variant of the song, changing the words to "To the Capitol Jail" instead of "To Birmingham Jail."

A group of camp counselors sing the song, accompanied by guitar, in the opening scene of Friday the 13th (1980) and the ending scene from the fifth episode of Crystal Lake.
