= Moon Song (That Wasn't Meant for Me) =

"Moon Song (That Wasn't Meant for Me)" is a popular song and jazz standard with music by Arthur Johnston and lyrics by Sam Coslow that was published in 1932.

The song was introduced by Kate Smith in the Paramount movie Hello, Everybody!

Popular versions in 1933 were by Wayne King, Jack Denny (vocal by Paul Small) and by Art Kassel.

The song has since been recorded by many other singers, including Doris Day on her album Day by Night, Louis Armstrong and Oscar Peterson on their 1957 album Louis Armstrong Meets Oscar Peterson, Sue Raney on her 1958 album When Your Lover Has Gone, Mel Torme for his album Swingin' on the Moon (1960), Frank Sinatra on his album Moonlight Sinatra (1965), Jo Stafford on her album This Is Jo Stafford (1965) and Dan Barrett and his Extra-Celestials with special guest Rebecca Kilgore on the album Moon Song (1998).
