= Memory Songs =

Compilation album by Jo Stafford
- Released: January 1, 1955
- Genre: Traditional pop
- Label: Capitol

Jo Stafford chronology
Happy Holiday (1955)	Memory Songs (1955)	Soft and Sentimental (1955)

Professional ratings
Review scores
Source	Rating
Allmusic	3/5 stars

Memory Songs is a 1955 album by Jo Stafford and Gordon MacRae. The LP, Capitol T-428, was a combination of two albums from the past: the LP version of ‘Sunday Evening Songs’ (1950), and the EP 'Memory Songs' from 1953.

== Track listing ==
Side one

1. "Wunderbar"
2. "Need You"
3. "Long, Long, Ago"
4. "Juanita"
5. "In the Gloaming"
6. "Last Night"

Side two

1. "Beyond the Sunset"
2. "Whispering Hope"
3. "Stars of the Summer Night"
4. "Sweet and Low"
5. "Love's Old Sweet Song"
6. "Now the Day Is Over"
