= As You Desire Me =

"As You Desire Me" may refer to:

- As You Desire Me (play) (Come tu mi vuoi), a 1930 play by Luigi Pirandello
  - As You Desire Me (film), a 1932 movie starring Greta Garbo based on the play
- "As You Desire Me" (song), a popular song recorded by Frank Sinatra, Jo Stafford, and others
- As You Desire Me (Jo Stafford album), a 1952 Jo Stafford album featuring the song
- As You Desire Me (Bill Doggett album), a 1956 album by Bill Doggett featuring the song
