= Broadway's Best =

Broadway's Best may refer to:

- Broadway's Best (radio station), a Showtunes radio station on Sirius Satellite Radio
- Broadway's Best (album), an album by Jo Stafford
