= Long, Long Ago =

1833 song by Thomas Haynes Bayly

"Long, Long Ago" is a song dealing with nostalgia, written in 1833 by English composer Thomas Haynes Bayly. Originally called "The Long Ago", its name was apparently changed by the editor Rufus Wilmot Griswold when it was first published, posthumously, in a Philadelphia magazine, along with a collection of other songs and poems by Bayly. The song was well received, and became one of the most popular songs in the United States in 1844.

The first popular recording of the song was that by Geraldine Farrar for the Victor Talking Machine Company in 1913.

In 1939, the tune was given new words (revised slightly in 1941) and a bouncier tempo. It became the 1942 Glenn Miller hit "Don't Sit Under the Apple Tree (with Anyone Else but Me)".

== Other recordings ==
- Louis Armstrong – recorded March 10, 1941 for Decca Records (catalog No. 3700A).
- In 1950, Patti Page recorded a cover as an alternate flip side to her hit record, "Tennessee Waltz".
- Jo Stafford and Gordon MacRae – for the album Songs for Sunday Evening (1950)
- The Mills Brothers – included in the album Famous Barber Shop Ballads Volume Two (1949).
- Nat King Cole and Dean Martin – a single release for Capitol Records (1954).
- Bing Crosby included the song in a medley on his album Join Bing and Sing Along (1959)
- Sam Cooke – for his album Swing Low (1961)
- Marty Robbins – included in the compilation album Long Long Ago (1984).
- A Hungarian version begins with the line "Régi mesékre emlékszel-e még" ("Do you still remember old tales?").
- An uncredited violin recording of the song was sampled in "Left Hand Suzuki Method" by Gorillaz for the album G-Sides and the deluxe edition of Gorillaz.
