= Songs of Faith =

Songs of Faith may refer to:

- Songs of Faith (Aretha Franklin album), 1956
- Songs of Faith (Jack Hannah album)
- Songs of Faith (Jo Stafford album), 1950

== See also ==
- Songs of Faith and Devotion
  - Songs of Faith and Devotion Live
