= Whispering Hope =

Whispering Hope may refer to:

- "Whispering Hope" (song), a song written in 1868 by Septimus Winner
- Whispering Hope (album), a 1962 album by Jo Stafford and Gordon MacRae
