= All Alone (Jo Stafford album) =

Compilation album by Jo Stafford
- Released: 1963
- Recorded: February 1963
- Genre: Traditional pop
- Label: Vocalion Records

Jo Stafford chronology
Whispering Hope (1962)	All Alone (1963)	There's Peace in the Valley (1963)

All Alone is a 1963 studio album recorded by Jo Stafford and released by Vocalion Records. It was recorded for Reprise Records in 1963 and originally released as Getting Sentimental over Tommy Dorsey.

== Track listing ==
=== Side 1 ===
1. The One I Love (Belongs to Somebody Else)
2. I'll Never Smile Again Until I Smile at You
3. Oh! Look at Me Now
4. Who Can I Turn to?
5. There Are Such Things
6. I'll Take Tallulah

=== Side 2 ===
1. Let's Get Away From It All
2. It Started All Over Again
3. Whatcha Know Joe
4. The Night We Called It a Day
5. Yes Indeed (with Sammy Davis Jr.)
