= Juanita (Caroline Norton song) =

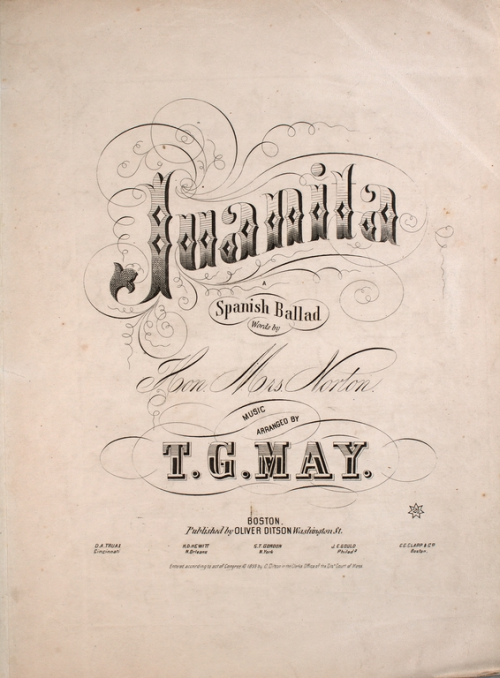
- Sheet music cover (1855)

Song
- Published: 1855
- Composer: Caroline Norton
- Lyricist: Caroline Norton

"Juanita" ("Nita Juanita") is a love song variously subtitled "A Spanish Ballad", "A Song of Spain", and others. "Juanita" was number two of a six-song collection entitled Songs of Affection published December 1853 by Chappell & Co. and composed by noted Victorian society figure and social reformer Caroline Norton. "Juanita" was the first ballad by a woman composer to achieve massive sales, and its original setting (for a soprano) has been seen to be subtly subversive of gender roles (as the woman singing the song is taking the part of the wooing lover), a topic of some significance to Mrs. Norton.

As composing was seen as a masculine occupation, it was typical to borrow or adapt the melodies. The opening four-bar phrase of the song is taken from Handel's aria Lascia ch'io pianga from the opera Rinaldo, although the subsequent melody differs from that of the aria. The name of the song is derived from the refrains:

Nita! Juanita! Ask thy soul if we should part!
Nita! Juanita! Lean thou on my heart.

Nita! Juanita! Let me linger by thy side!
Nita! Juanita! Be my own fair bride!

"Juanita" appears in numerous songbooks and has been recorded many times. Early successes were by Frank C. Stanley (1905) and by Emilio de Gogorza in 1919. The song was included in the Jo Stafford and Gordon MacRae album Memory Songs (1955). A crowd of picnickers sings the song, near the 41-minute mark, in the 1955 film Picnic. Jim Reeves included the song (as "My Juanita") in his album Girls I Have Known (1958) and Bing Crosby featured the song in a medley on his album 101 Gang Songs (1961).

The song was featured in The Andy Griffith Show episode "The Loaded Goat", in which Barney Fife plays the song on a harmonica to entice a goat that has eaten dynamite out of Mayberry in order to prevent it from detonating and harming anyone.
