= 16 Most Requested Songs =

16 Most Requested Songs may refer to:

- 16 Most Requested Songs (Bobby Vinton album), 1991
- 16 Most Requested Songs (Jo Stafford album), 1995
- 16 Most Requested Songs (Johnny Mathis album), 1986
