= Mr. Rhythm (Frankie Laine album) =

Studio album by Frankie Laine
- Released: 1954
- Genre: Jazz
- Label: Columbia

Frankie Laine chronology
A Musical Portrait of New Orleans (1954)	Mr. Rhythm (1954)	Jazz Spectacular (1955)

Professional ratings
Review scores
Source	Rating
AllMusic	3/5 stars
The Encyclopedia of Popular Music	3/5 stars

Mr. Rhythm is a 10-inch studio album by Frankie Laine, released in 1954 on Columbia Records. It was recorded with Paul Weston and his orchestra and Carl Fischer on the piano.

It was Laines' third album for Columbia, after One for My Baby (recorded in 1951) and A Musical Portrait of New Orleans (recorded in 1953 together with Jo Stafford).

The album was released in two formats: one 10-inch long-playing 33-rpm record and a set of four 7-inch 45-rpm records.

== Track listing ==
Side one
No.	Title	Writer(s)	Length
1.	"Some Day, Sweetheart"	John Spikes; Reb Spikes
2.	"A Hundred Years from Today"	J. Young; Washington; V. Young
3.	"Laughing at Life"	N. Kenny; C. Kenny; C. Todd; B. Todd
4.	"Lullaby in Rhythm"	B. Goodman; Sampson; Profit

Side two
No.	Title	Writer(s)	Length
1.	"Willow Weep for Me"	Ronell
2.	"My Ohio Home"	Kahn; Donaldson
3.	"Judy"	Carmichael; Lerner
4.	"After You've Gone"	Creamer; Layton
