= The Joyful Season =

- 2005 CD reissue cover

Compilation album by Jo Stafford
- Released: October 1964
- Genre: Traditional pop Christmas, Rock Music
- Label: Capitol (LP); DRG (CD)
- Producer: Lee Gillette

Jo Stafford chronology
Jo Stafford's Sweet Hour of Prayer (1964)	The Joyful Season (1964)	Getting Sentimental over Tommy Dorsey (1964)

Professional ratings
Review scores
Source	Rating
Allmusic	3/5 stars

The Joyful Season is a 1964 Christmas album by Jo Stafford. It is unique in that it features Stafford accompanying herself as a vocal choir through the use of multitrack recording and incorporating the use of electric guitars. The album was reissued on CD in 2005 by DRG.

== Track listing ==
=== Side 1 ===
1. "Little Drummer Boy"
2. "Santa Claus Is Coming to Town"
3. "Deck the Halls"
4. "White Christmas"
5. "Jingle Bells"
6. "Merry Christmas"

=== Side 2 ===
1. "Christmas is the Season (of the Bells)"
2. "O Little Town of Bethlehem"
3. "Silver Bells"
4. "Winter Wonderland"
5. "Silent Night"

=== CD bonus tracks ===
1. "Gesu Bambino"
2. "Ave Maria"
3. "Christmas Medley #1: Hark the Herald Angels Sing/The First Noel/O Come All Ye Faithful" (with Gordon MacRae)
4. "Christmas Medley #2: Joy to the World/It Came Upon a Midnight Clear" (with Gordon MacRae)
5. "Toys for Tots"
