= Jo Stafford's Sweet Hour of Prayer =

1964 compilation album by Jo Stafford

Compilation album by Jo Stafford
- Released: March 1964
- Genre: Traditional pop Inspirational music
- Label: Capitol

Jo Stafford chronology
The Hits of Jo Stafford (1964)	Jo Stafford's Sweet Hour of Prayer (1964)	The Joyful Season (1964)

Professional ratings
Review scores
Source	Rating
Allmusic	3/5 stars

Jo Stafford's Sweet Hour of Prayer (released in March 1964) is a compilation of inspirational songs recorded by American singer Jo Stafford on Capitol Records T/ST-2096.

== Track listing ==
1. "Count Your Blessings"
2. "How Great Thou Art"
3. "Whiter Than Snow"
4. "Little Brown Church in the Wildwood"
5. "A Mighty Fortress Is Our God"
6. "My Task"
7. "Sweet By and By"
8. "Sweet Hour of Prayer"
9. "What a Friend We Have in Jesus"
10. "When the Roll is Called up Yonder"
11. "I Love to Tell the Story"
12. "The Ninety and Nine"
