= My Heart's in the Highlands (album) =

Studio album by Jo Stafford
- Released: 1954
- Label: Columbia

Jo Stafford chronology
Garden of Prayer (1954)	My Heart's in the Highlands (1954)	A Musical Portrait of New Orleans (1954)

Professional ratings
Review scores
Source	Rating
Allmusic	3/5 stars

My Heart's in the Highlands is an album by Jo Stafford, arranged and conducted by Paul Weston, released in 1954 by Columbia Records. This addition to Stafford's discography is a collection of Scottish love songs. The album was expanded in 1957 and issued as Songs of Scotland.

== Track listing ==
Side one

1. "My Heart's in the Highlands"
2. "John Anderson, My Jo"
3. "Ye Banks and Braes of Bonnie Doon"
4. "Moll's Meek, Molly's Sweet"

Side two

1. "My Love is Like a Red, Red Rose"
2. "Green Grow the Rashes, O"
3. "My Jean"
4. "The Bonnie Lad That's Far Away"
