= Jo's Greatest Hits =

Compilation album by Jo Stafford
- Released: November 1958
- Label: Columbia

Jo Stafford chronology
Swingin' Down Broadway (1958)	Jo's Greatest Hits (1958)	Ballad of the Blues (1959)

Professional ratings
Review scores
Source	Rating
Allmusic	4.5/5 stars

Jo's Greatest Hits is an album by Jo Stafford, released in November 1958 by Columbia Records and featuring, as the name implies, a compilation of the singer's greatest hits.

== Track listing ==
Side one

1. "Jambalaya" (#3, 1957)
2. "Keep It a Secret" (#4, 1952)
3. "Teach Me Tonight" (#15, 1954)
4. "It Is No Secret" (#15, 1951)
5. "Hawaiian War Chant" (1951)
6. "Tennessee Waltz" (#7, 1951)

Side two

1. "You Belong to Me" (#1, 1952)
2. "Make Love to Me!" (#1, 1954)
3. "Shrimp Boats" (#2, 1951)
4. "Stardust" (1950)
5. "If" (#8, 1951)
6. "If You've Got the Money, I've Got the Time" (#14, 1950)
