= The Hits of Jo Stafford =

Greatest hits album by Jo Stafford
- Released: January 1, 1964
- Genre: Traditional pop
- Label: Capitol

Jo Stafford chronology
Peace in the Valley (1963)	The Hits of Jo Stafford (1964)	Jo Stafford's Sweet Hour of Prayer (1964)

Professional ratings
Review scores
Source	Rating
AllMusic	4.5/5 stars

The Hits of Jo Stafford is a 1964 album by Jo Stafford, issued by Capitol Records. It consists of songs she helped make famous, re-recorded in stereo.

== Track listing ==
Track #	Song	Songwriter(s)
1	"You Belong to Me"	Chilton Price/Pee Wee King/Redd Stewart
2	"Shrimp Boats"	Paul Weston/Paul Mason Howard
3	"Yesterdays"	Jerome Kern/Otto Harbach
4	"Make Love to Me"	George Brunies/Alan Copeland/Paul Mares/Walter Melrose/William Norvas/Ben Pollack/Leon Roppolo/Mel Stitzel
5	"Georgia on My Mind"	Hoagy Carmichael/Stuart Gorrell
6	"Jambalaya (On the Bayou)"	Hank Williams
7	"Come Rain or Come Shine"	Harold Arlen/Johnny Mercer
8	"No Other Love"	Paul Weston/Bob Russell
9	"Day by Day"	Axel Stordahl/Paul Weston/Sammy Cahn
10	"The Gentleman Is a Dope"	Richard Rodgers/Oscar Hammerstein II
11	"I'll Be Seeing You"	Sammy Fain/Irving Kahal
12	"The Trolley Song"	Ralph Blane/Hugh Martin
