= Jo & Friends =

Compilation album by Jo Stafford

Compilation album by Jo Stafford
- Released: January 1, 2000
- Genre: Traditional pop
- Label: Sony Music Special Products

Jo Stafford and Friends

Compilation album by Jo Stafford
- Released: October 30, 2007
- Genre: Traditional pop
- Label: Collectables Records

Jo & Friends is a 2000 compilation album of songs recorded by American singer Jo Stafford and various other artists. The friends who accompany her on this album include Nelson Eddy, Liberace and Vic Damone. It was released by Sony Music on their Sony Music Special Products label on January 1, 2000. A second album, titled Jo Stafford and Friends featuring the same tracks was released on October 30, 2007, on the Collectables Records label.

In 2008 the album was released as part of a three CD set along with Getting Sentimental over Tommy Dorsey and Best of Jo Stafford.

== Track listing ==
1. I Love You Truly (with Nelson Eddy)
2. Teardrops from My Eyes (with Gene Autry, under the direction of Carl Cotner)
3. April and You (with Liberace)
4. When I Grow Too Old to Dream (with Nelson Eddy)
5. Good Nite (with Vic Damone and the Mellomen)
6. Indiscretion (with Liberace)
7. With These Hands (with Nelson Eddy)
8. My Heart Cries for You (with Gene Autry, orchestra under the direction of Carl Cotner)
9. Silence Is Golden (with Vic Damone and the Mellomen)
10. Till We Meet Again (with Nelson Eddy)
