= Starring Jo Stafford =

Compilation album by Jo Stafford
- Released: January 1, 1953
- Genre: Traditional pop
- Label: Capitol

Jo Stafford chronology
Broadway's Best (1953)	Starring Jo Stafford (1953)	Garden of Prayer (1954)

Professional ratings
Review scores
Source	Rating
Allmusic	3/5 stars

Starring Jo Stafford is a 1953 album by Jo Stafford, with Paul Weston and His Orchestra and accompaniment by The Starlighters and The Pied Pipers. In 1997, EMI issued it on a CD along with 1950's Autumn in New York.

== Track listing ==
1. "Serenade of the Bells" (Kay Twomey, Al Goodhart, Al Urbano) – 2:54
2. "On the Alamo" (Isham Jones, Gus Kahn) – 2:57
3. "No Other Love" (Paul Weston, Bob Russell) – 3:00
4. "Red River Valley" (trad. arranged by Paul Weston) – 2:46
5. "Ivy" (Hoagy Carmichael) – 2:54
6. "Fools Rush In" (Rube Bloom, Johnny Mercer) – 3:07
7. "A Sunday Kind of Love" (Barbara Belle, Anita Leonard, Stan Rhodes, Louis Prima) – 2:51
8. "The Gentleman Is a Dope" (Richard Rodgers, Oscar Hammerstein II) – 2:45
9. "Symphony" (Alex Alstone, Jack Lawrence, Andre Gaston Isaac Tabet, Roger Bernstein) – 2:29
10. "Tumbling Tumbleweeds" (Bob Nolan) – 2:50
11. "You Keep Coming Back Like a Song" (Irving Berlin) – 2:50
12. "Day by Day" (Axel Stordahl, Paul Weston, Sammy Cahn) – 2:59
