= Peace in the Valley (Jo Stafford album) =

There's Peace in the Valley

Compilation album by Jo Stafford and Gordon MacRae
- Released: June 1963
- Recorded: April 1963
- Genre: Inspirational
- Label: Capitol

Jo Stafford chronology
All Alone (1963)	There's Peace in the Valley (1963)	The Hits of Jo Stafford (1963)

Professional ratings
Review scores
Source	Rating
AllMusic	3/5 stars

There's Peace in the Valley is a 1963 album by Jo Stafford and Gordon MacRae.

== Track listing ==
1. "He Bought My Soul at Calvary"
2. "Somebody Bigger Than You and I"
3. "I Believe"
4. "All Through the Night"
5. "I May Never Pass This Way Again"
6. "You'll Never Walk Alone"
7. "He"
8. "Nearer, My God, to Thee"
9. "The Lord Is My Shepherd"
10. "(There'll Be) Peace in the Valley"
11. "Oh! Holy Morning"
12. "Shepherd Show Me How to Go"

Billboard reviewed the album on June 22, 1963
