= Garden of Prayer =

Studio album by Jo Stafford
- Released: May 1954
- Genre: Traditional pop Inspirational music
- Label: Columbia Records

Jo Stafford chronology
| Broadway's Best (1950) | Garden of Prayer (1954) | My Heart's in the Highlands (1954) |

Professional ratings
Review scores
| Source | Rating |
|---|---|
| Allmusic | 3/5 stars |

Garden of Prayer is a 1954 album of songs recorded by American singer Jo Stafford, accompanied by the orchestra of Paul Weston. Each of the eight tracks on this album has a religious or inspirational theme. It was released in 1954 by Columbia Records (CL 6286), then reissued on CD in 2010 by Sinetone AMR, and appears under two titles - either Garden of Prayer or Beautiful Garden of Prayer.

A contemporary reviewer writing for Billboard was quite impressed. They praised Stafford for being able to "sing almost any type of tune" and for doing "a first-rate job here". Stafford sings these "sacred songs....with deep conviction and sincerity", and the reviewer notes that the album should be quite popular in the Bible Belt of the United States.

== Track listing ==
1. It Is No Secret (3:10)
2. Star of Hope (2:37)
3. He Bought My Soul At Calvary (2:44)
4. I Found a Friend (3:11)
5. Beautiful Isle of Somewhere (2:47)
6. Invisible Hands (2:56)
7. (There'll Be) Peace in the Valley (2:53)
8. The Beautiful Garden of Prayer (2:21) (Written by: Eleanor A. Schroll published: 1920)
