= Do I Hear a Waltz? (Jo Stafford album) =

Studio album by Jo Stafford
- Released: January 1966
- Genre: Traditional pop
- Label: Dot Records

Jo Stafford chronology
Getting Sentimental over Tommy Dorsey (1963)	Do I Hear a Waltz? (1966)	This Is Jo Stafford (1966)

Professional ratings
Review scores
Source	Rating
Allmusic	3/5 stars

Do I Hear a Waltz? is a studio album by Jo Stafford and Paul Weston on Dot Records released in 1966.

== Track listing ==
1. "Do I Hear a Waltz?" (Richard Rodgers - Stephen Sondheim
2. "Down in the Valley"
3. "Three-Four, Open the Door"
4. "The King of Paris" (Paul Weston - Marilyn Bergman)
5. "Beautiful Ohio"
6. "Together"
7. "True Love"
8. "I See Your Face Before Me"
9. "Fascination"
10. "When I'm Not Near the Boy I Love" (Burton Lane - Yip Harburg)
11. "Far Away Places"
12. "Afterthoughts" (Gene de Paul - Carolyn Leigh)
