= A Musical Portrait of New Orleans =

Studio album by Jo Stafford and Frankie Laine
- Released: August 1954
- Genre: traditional pop
- Label: Columbia

Jo Stafford chronology
My Heart's in the Highlands (1954)	A Musical Portrait of New Orleans (1954)	Happy Holiday (1955)

Frankie Laine chronology
One for My Baby (1952)	A Musical Portrait of New Orleans (1954)	Mr. Rhythm (1954)

Professional ratings
Review scores
Source	Rating
Allmusic	3/5 stars

A Musical Portrait of New Orleans, a 1954 album by Jo Stafford and Frankie Laine in which they combine their talents in a mix of solos and duets. Paul Weston and his Orchestra provide the music. This album was issued in the UK by Phillips under the title Floatin' Down to Cotton Town.

== Track listing ==
1. "Way Down Yonder in New Orleans" (duet)
2. "Raminay! (The New Orleans Chimney Sweep)" (Stafford solo)
3. "New Orleans" (Laine solo)
4. "Jambalaya (On the Bayou)" (Stafford solo)
5. "Floatin' Down to Cotton Town" (duet)
6. "Do You Know What It Means to Miss New Orleans?" (Laine solo)
7. "Shrimp Boats" (Stafford solo)
8. "Basin Street Blues" (duet)
