= Once Over Lightly =

Studio album by Jo Stafford
- Released: March 1957
- Genre: Traditional pop
- Label: Columbia

Jo Stafford chronology
The Piano Artistry of Jonathan Edwards (1956)	Once Over Lightly (1957)	Swingin' Down Broadway (1958)

Professional ratings
Review scores
Source	Rating
Allmusic	2.5/5 stars

Once Over Lightly is a 1957 album by Jo Stafford. On this album she is accompanied by the Art Van Damme Quintet. Once Over Lightly was released on the Columbia label.

== Track listing ==
1. "Almost Like Being in Love" (Frederick Loewe, Alan Jay Lerner) - 2:50
2. "A Foggy Day" (George Gershwin, Ira Gershwin) - 3:06
3. "The Lady Is a Tramp" (Richard Rodgers, Lorenz Hart) - 2:49
4. "These Foolish Things" (Jack Strachey, Eric Maschwitz) - 3:25
5. "Mine" (George Gershwin, Ira Gershwin) - 2:30
6. "The Gypsy in My Soul" (Clay Boland, Moe Jaffe) - 3:27
7. "Autumn Leaves" (Joseph Kosma, Jacques Prévert, Johnny Mercer) - 3:03
8. "You're Mine, You" (Johnny Green, Edward Heyman) - 2:18
9. "Nice Work If You Can Get It" (George Gershwin, Ira Gershwin) - 1:52
10. "My Old Flame" (Arthur Johnston, Sam Coslow) -3:19
11. "But Not for Me" (George Gershwin, Ira Gershwin) - 3:14
12. "One for My Baby" (Harold Arlen, Johnny Mercer) - 3:49
