= Swingin' Down Broadway =

1958 album by Jo Stafford

Studio album by Jo Stafford
- Released: March 1958
- Recorded: 1958
- Label: Columbia Records

Jo Stafford chronology
Once Over Lightly (1957)	Swingin' Down Broadway (1958)	Jo's Greatest Hits (1958)

Professional ratings
Review scores
Source	Rating
Allmusic	4.5/5 stars

Swingin' Down Broadway is a 1958 album by Jo Stafford and arranged by Paul Weston, released by Columbia Records. The album was re-released as Jo + Broadway by Corinthian Records in 1978.

Jo + Broadway

Studio album by Jo Stafford
- Released: 1978 (Corinthian)
- Recorded: 1958
- Label: Corinthian Records

Jo Stafford chronology
In the Mood for Love	Jo + Broadway	Jo Stafford:By Request

== Track listing ==
Side one

1. "Love for Sale"
2. "Happiness Is a Thing Called Joe" - 2:41
3. "How High the Moon"
4. "Speak Low" - 2:11
5. "It Never Entered My Mind" - 2:35
6. "Taking a Chance on Love" - 2:52

Side two

1. "Anything Goes" - 2:42
2. "The Gentleman Is a Dope" - 2:51
3. "I Got it Bad"
4. "Old Devil Moon" - 2:30
5. "Any Place I Hang My Hat Is Home" - 3:37
6. "Tomorrow Mountain"
