= This Is Jo Stafford =

Studio album by Jo Stafford
- Released: September 1966
- Genre: Traditional pop
- Label: Dot Records

Jo Stafford chronology
Do I Hear a Waltz? (1966)	This Is Jo Stafford (1966)	Darlene Remembers Duke, Jonathan Plays Fats (1982)

Professional ratings
Review scores
Source	Rating
Allmusic	3/5 stars

This Is Jo Stafford is an album by Jo Stafford accompanied by the Ernie Freeman Orchestra released by Dot Records (catalog No. DLP 3745) in September 1966. It was also issued as a stereo album (Dot DLP 25745).

== Track listing ==
1. "Cry, Cry Darling" (J. D. Miller / Jimmy C. Newman)
2. "Falling In Love Again"
3. "The Time of Day"
4. "Love Lies"
5. "Think of Me"
6. "I'd Climb the Highest Mountain" (Lew Brown / Sidney Clare)
7. "Ev'ry Night When the Sun Goes In"
8. "A Little Kiss Each Morning" (Harry M. Woods)
9. "Cup Full of Tears" (Bob Merrill)
10. "Moon Song"
11. "A Time to Love ( A Time to Cry)" (Sidney Bechet / Bill Giant / Bernie Baum / Florence Kaye)
12. "If I Had You"
