= Soft and Sentimental =

Studio album by Jo Stafford
- Released: October 1955
- Genre: Traditional pop
- Label: Columbia

Jo Stafford chronology
Memory Songs (1955)	Soft and Sentimental (1955)	Songs of Scotland (1955)

Professional ratings
Review scores
Source	Rating
Allmusic	3/5 stars

Soft and Sentimental is a 1955 album by Jo Stafford.

== Track listing ==
1. "September in the Rain" (Harry Warren, Al Dubin) – 2:58
2. "Early Autumn" (Ralph Burns, Woody Herman, Johnny Mercer) – 2:48
3. "I'm Always Chasing Rainbows" (Harry Carroll, Joseph McCarthy) – 3:06
4. "Don't Worry 'bout Me" (Rube Bloom, Ted Koehler) – 3:09
5. "Smoking My Sad Cigarette" (Bee Walker, Don George) – 3:11
6. "Love Is Here to Stay" (George Gershwin, Ira Gershwin) – 3:38
