= Kiss Me, Kate (Jo Stafford and Gordon MacRae album) =

Studio album by Jo Stafford and Gordon MacRae
- Released: April 1949
- Genre: Traditional pop
- Label: Capitol

Jo Stafford and Gordon MacRae chronology
Kiss Me, Kate (1949)	American Folk Songs (1950)

Professional ratings
Review scores
Source	Rating
Billboard	80/100
Allmusic	3/5 stars

Selections from "Kiss Me, Kate", or simply "Kiss Me, Kate, is a 1949 album of songs from the musical of the same name recorded by American singer Jo Stafford and actor and singer Gordon MacRae. It was released in April 1949 on Capitol Records. In its record review column, Saturday Review called it the best album of the show's songs outside the original cast album.

== Track listing ==
All songs written by Cole Porter

1. "Wunderbar" – 2:48
2. "Too Darn Hot"
3. "Were Thine That Special Face"
4. "I Hate Men"
5. "Always True to You in My Fashion"
6. "Bianca"
7. "So in Love"
8. "Why Can't You Behave?"
