= American Folk Songs =

Studio album by Jo Stafford
- Released: May 1948
- Genre: Folk
- Length: 32:09
- Label: Capitol, Corinthian

Jo Stafford chronology
| Kiss Me, Kate (1949) | American Folk Songs (1948) | Autumn in New York (1950) |

Professional ratings
Review scores
| Source | Rating |
|---|---|
| Allmusic | 3/5 stars |

American Folk Songs is a 1948 album by Jo Stafford. The original release featured six songs on three 78-RPM discs. It was released as a long-playing record in 1950, with two additional songs. Since the 1961 re-recording and 1962 re-release, the album has featured twelve popular folk songs. The Saturday Review described the album as "of its own excellence."

Judy Collins has cited the album as one of the first to spark her interest in folk music.

== Track listing ==
All songs are traditional.

| No. | Title | Length |
|---|---|---|
| 1. | "Shenandoah" | 3:38 |
| 2. | "Black Is the Color" | 2:58 |
| 3. | "Old Joe Clark" | 1:43 |
| 4. | "Wayfaring Stranger" | 3:02 |
| 5. | "Barbara Allen" | 2:57 |
| 6. | "Single Girl" | 2:14 |
| 7. | "Red Rosey Bush" | 2:56 |
| 8. | "I Wonder as I Wander" | 3:07 |
| 9. | "Cripple Creek" | 1:30 |
| 10. | "The Nightingale" | 3:26 |
| 11. | "Johnny Has Gone for a Soldier" | 2:52 |
| 12. | "Sourwood Mountain" | 1:46 |
