= Ballad of the Blues =

Studio album by Jo Stafford
- Released: October 1959
- Recorded: February 10, 1959
- Studio: Radio Recorders, Hollywood, California
- Genre: Jazz, traditional pop, blues
- Length: 66:01

Jo Stafford chronology
I'll Be Seeing You (1958)	Ballad of the Blues (1959)	Jo + Jazz (1960)

Professional ratings
Review scores
Source	Rating
Allmusic	3/5 stars

Ballad of the Blues is an album by vocalist Jo Stafford that was released in 1959. She is supported by the Starlighters, a male vocal quartet, and an orchestra led by Paul Weston, her husband.

Stafford sings pop, jazz, and blues songs which form a concept album. These include cover versions of traditional songs such as "Nobody Knows the Trouble I've Seen", "Sometimes I Feel Like a Motherless Child", and "Lover Man" in addition to original songs written by Alan and Marilyn Bergman.

== Track listing ==
1. The Blues Is an Old Old Story (1:49) (Alan Bergman/Marilyn Bergman)
2. Street Cries (1:03) (Paul Weston)
3. John Henry (2:46) (Traditional/Weston)
4. Sometimes I Feel Like a Motherless Child (:47) (Traditional/Weston)
5. Nobody Knows the Trouble I've Seen (2:29) (Traditional)
6. The Blues Is a Tale of Trouble (1:45) (Bergman/Bergman/Weston)
7. Kansas City Blues (3:15) (Bergman/Bergman/Weston)
8. Memphis Blues (2:49) (W. C. Handy/George Norton)
9. The Blues Is a Traveling Thing (1:19) (Bergman/Bergman/Weston)
10. He's Gone Away (2:18) (Traditional)
11. Seems Like When It Comes in the Morning (0:27)
12. Every Night When the Sun Goes In (2:38) (Traditional)
13. Times Change and Things Change (1:51) (Bergman/Bergman/Weston)
14. Lover Man (4:00) (Jimmy Davis/Ram Ramirez/Jimmy Sherman)
15. Blues in the Night (3:14) (Harold Arlen, Johnny Mercer)
16. The Blues Is an Old Old Story (Reprise) (0:50) (Bergman/Bergman)
