= Darby and Tarlton =

American band

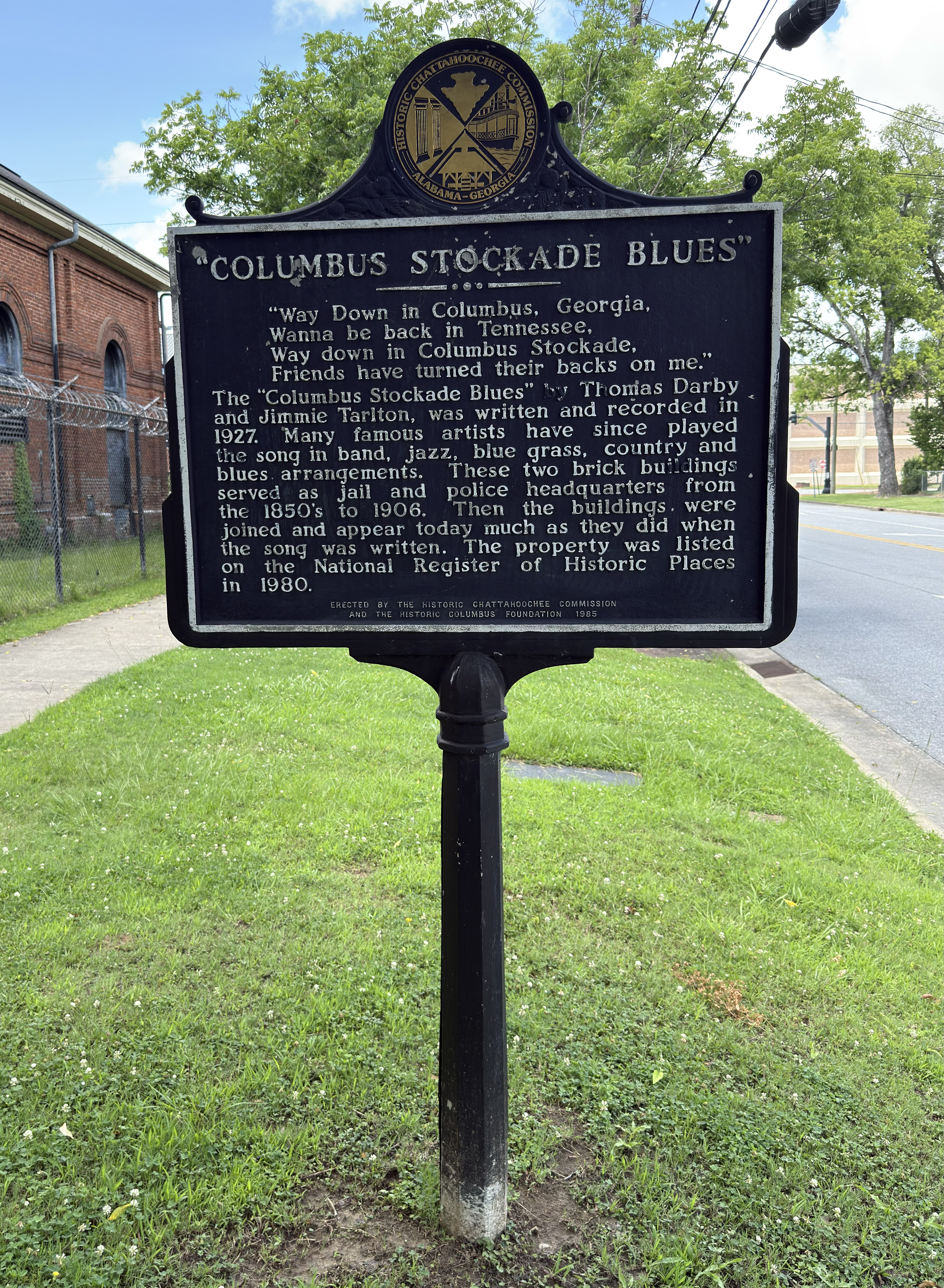
- Historical marker honoring their best-known song, “Columbus Stockade Blues"

Background information
- Origin: Columbus, Georgia
- Years active: 1920s-1940s

Darby and Tarlton were an American early country music duo, who achieved some level of success in the late 1920s. The duo consisted of Tom Darby (born January 7, 1883 Columbus, Georgia – June 1971 Dallas, Texas) and Jimmie Tarlton, (born John James Rimbert Tarlton, May 8, 1892 Cheraw, South Carolina – 1979). They preferred songs from the 1800s as well as ones about trains and hobos or the blues, which sold quite well. They thrived in the new era of radio and records and mostly toured throughout Alabama and Georgia. Of their hit songs, “Columbus Stockade Blues” had some of the greatest staying power. Pete Seeger claimed Woody Guthrie had taught him how to play it, while Leon Russell, Johnny Cash, Norman Blake, Elvis Presley and Willie Nelson have also performed the song.

== Biography ==
Tarlton grew up on a farm in Chesterfield County, South Carolina, learning folk songs from an early age. His parents were sharecroppers and he had to help out with the chores. He still managed to find the time to learn the slide guitar and banjo. After working as a street musician in the 1920s, Tarlton met Frank Ferera, who taught him how to play the Hawaiian guitar. Using this slide guitar style would be one of their signature influences on the development of American music. Tarlton soon moved to Columbus, Georgia, where he met Tom Darby in a music store. They were 35 and 42 when they began performing together and shortly, they were offered a chance to make a recording for Columbia Records. Two songs were cut on April 5, 1927, and the recording sold well enough to allow a second recording session. On November 10, 1927, they recorded four songs, among them "Birmingham Jail" and "Columbus Stockade Blues". The two songs, coupled on one record, became the duo's biggest hits selling more than 200,000 copies. Darby and Tarlton recorded 63 songs between 1927 and 1933. Tarlton and Darby had started to record on their own by the end of 1930. Tom Darby formed a short lived duo in 1931 together with Jesse Pitts, called The Georgia Wildcats while Tarlton recorded solo.

In 1933, they became hostile towards each other and went their separate ways professionally. One source of disagreement was over who wrote "Columbus Stockade Blues." Darby did, however, visit Tarlton occasionally. They could have made much more money but Darby insisted on taking a flat fee instead of royalties, which living in Columbus 30 years later he continued to regret. They did play some shows together in the 1940s. They had recorded around 100 songs together and had helped grow the tradition of the lyric lament.

In 1963, Darby and Tarlton reunited to perform in Weracoba Park (known locally as "Lakebottom") when they agreed to be part of the Columbus Symphony Orchestra's opening pops concert. Darby was quoted as saying in a 1963 interview with The Columbus Enquirer (now known as The Columbus Ledger-Enquirer) regarding the opening pops concert performance that "Tarlton’s fine wife said we sounded even better than before. Made goose pimples come up on her arms, she said."

During the folk revival of the 1960s, Tarlton performed again, despite being in poor health and nearly blind, including at the Newport Folk Festival in 1966.

Darby died in 1971 and Tarlton in 1979 and are both buried in Riverdale Cemetery in Columbus, Georgia.

== "Columbus Stockade Blues" ==
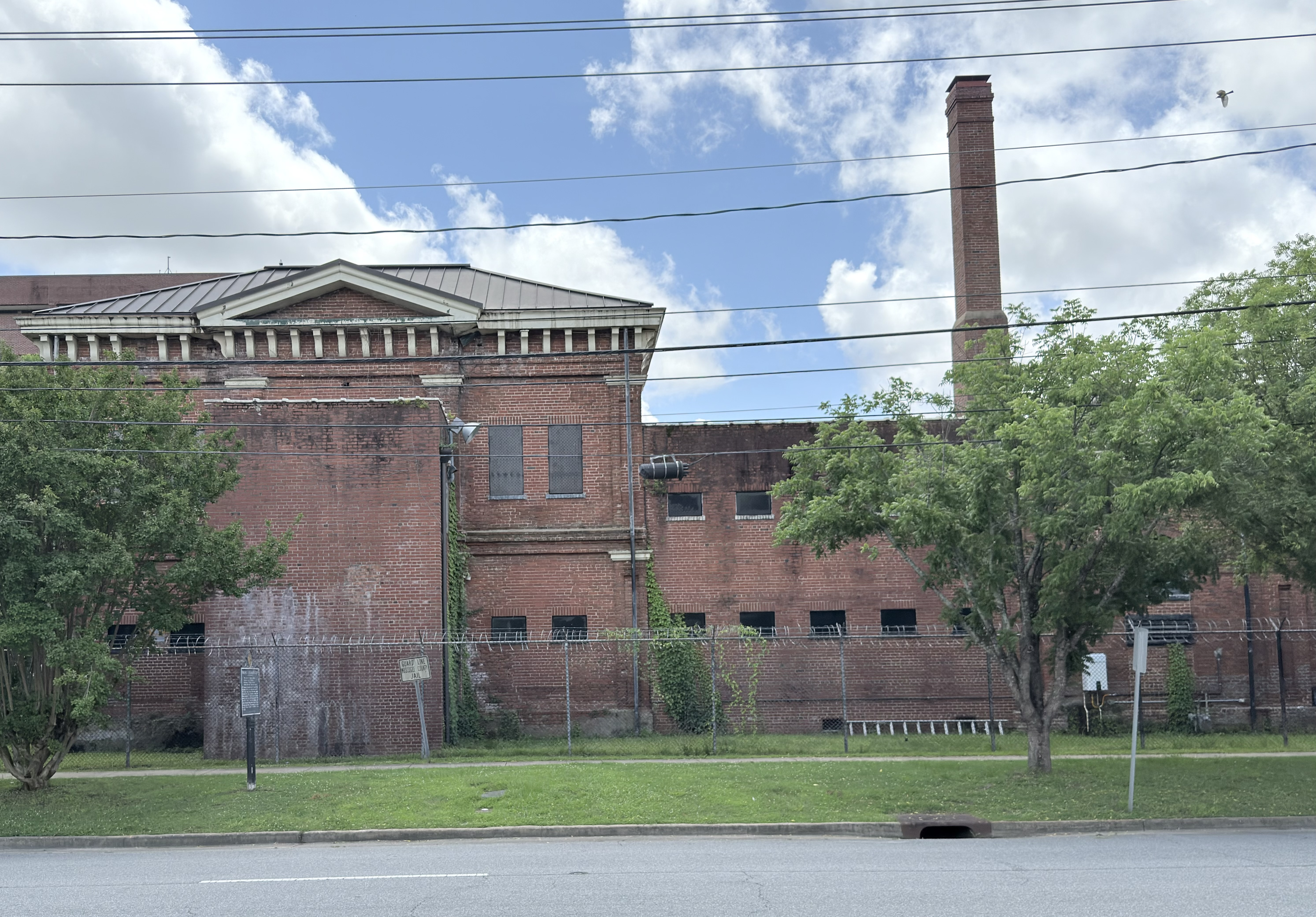
Columbus Stockade - a landmark on the National Register of Historic Places since 1980

Of their hit songs, “Columbus Stockade Blues” had some of the strongest staying power. Pete Seeger claimed Woody Guthrie had taught him how to play it, while Leon Russell, Johnny Cash and Elvis Presley have also performed the song. It was the first song on Willie Nelson's 1970 compilation album Columbus Stockade Blues.

Cliff Carlisle version (1930)

Moon Mullican version (1948)

== Original discography ==
=== Darby and Tarlton ===
| Matrix | Title | Record Cat. | Recording date |
|---|---|---|---|
| 143902 | "Down In Florida On a Hog" | Columbia 15197-D | April 5, 1927 |
| 143903 | "Birmingham Town" | Columbia 15197-D | April 5, 1927 |
| 145202 | "Birmingham Jail" | Columbia 15212-D | November 10, 1927 |
| 145203 | "Columbus Stockade Blues" | Columbia 15212-D | November 10, 1927 |
| 145204 | "Gamblin' Jim" | Columbia 15684-D | November 10, 1927 |
| 145205 | "Lonesome In the Pines" | Columbia 15684-D | November 10, 1927 |
| 146042 | "After the Ball" | Columbia 15254-D | April 12, 1928 |
| 146043 | "I Can't Tell You Why I Love You" | Columbia 15254-D | April 12, 1928 |
| 146044 | "Irish Police" | Columbia 15293-D | April 12, 1928 |
| 146045 | "The Hobo Tramp" | Columbia 15293-D | April 12, 1928 |
| 146046 | "Alto Waltz" | Columbia 15319-D | April 12, 1928 |
| 146047 | "Sleeping In the Manger" | Columbia unissued | April 12, 1928 |
| 146048 | "Daddy Won't Have No Easy Rider Here" | Columbia unissued | April 12, 1928 |
| 146049 | "Mexican Rag" | Columbia 15319-D | April 12, 1928 |
| 147358 | "Birmingham Jail no.2" | Columbia 15375-D | October 31, 1928 |
| 147359 | "The Rainbow Division" | Columbia 15360-D | October 31, 1928 |
| 147360 | "Country Girl Valley" | Columbia 15360-D | October 31, 1928 |
| 147361 | "Lonesome Railroad" | Columbia 15375-D | October 31, 1928 |
| 147366 | "If You Ever Learn To Love Me" | Columbia 15388-D | October 31, 1928 |
| 147367 | "If I Had Listened To My Mother" | Columbia 15388-D | October 31, 1928 |
| 147368 | "Traveling Yodel Blues" | Columbia 15330-D | October 31, 1928 |
| 147369 | "Heavy Hearted Blues" | Columbia 15330-D | October 31, 1928 |
| 148293 | "The New York Hobo" | Columbia 15452-D | April 15, 1929 |
| 148294 | "All Bound Down In Texas" | Columbia 15477-D | April 15, 1929 |
| 148295 | "Touring Yodel Blues" | Columbia 15419-D | April 15, 1929 |
| 148296 | "Slow Wicked Blues" | Columbia 15419-D | April 15, 1929 |
| 148297 | "Black Jack Moonshine" | Columbia 15452-D | April 15, 1929 |
| 148298 | "Ain't Gonna Marry No More" | Columbia 15477-D | April 15, 1929 |
| 148303 | "Down In the Old Cherry Orchard" | Columbia 15403-D | April 15, 1929 |
| 148304 | "Where the Bluebirds Nest Again" | Columbia 15403-D | April 15, 1929 |
| 148305 | "Beggar Joe" | Columbia 15624-D | April 15, 1929 |
| 148306 | "When You're Far Away From Home" | Columbia 15624-D | April 15, 1929 |
| 148307 | "Birmingham Rag" | Columbia 15436-D | April 15, 1929 |
| 148308 | "Sweet Sarah Blues" | Columbia 15436-D | April 15, 1929 |
| 149308 | "Where the River Shannon Flows" | Columbia unissued | October 31, 1929 |
| 149309 | "Little Bessie" | Columbia 15492-D | October 31, 1929 |
| 149310 | "I Left Her At the River" | Columbia 15492-D | October 31, 1929 |
| 149311 | "Jack and May" | Columbia 15528-D | October 31, 1929 |
| 149312 | "Captain Won't You Let Me Go Home" | Columbia 15528-D | October 31, 1929 |
| 149313 | "The Blue and the Grey" | Columbia unissued | October 31, 1929 |
| 149322 | "Going Back To My Texas Home" | Columbia 15715-D | October 31, 1929 |
| 149323 | "The Whistling Songbird" | Columbia 15511-D | October 31, 1929 |
| 149324 | "Freight Train Ramble" | Columbia 15511-D | October 31, 1929 |
| 149325 | "Lonesome Frisco Line" | Columbia unissued | October 31, 1929 |
| 149326 | "Down Among the Sugar Cane" | Columbia 15715-D | October 31, 1929 |
| 149327 | "What Is Home Without Love" | Columbia unissued | October 31, 1929 |
| 150247 | "The Black Sheep" | Columbia 15674-D | April 16, 1930 |
| 150248 | "Little Ola" | Columbia 15591-D | April 16, 1930 |
| 150249 | "Once I Had a Sweetheart" | Columbia 15674-D | April 16, 1930 |
| 150250 | "The Maple On the Hill" | Columbia 15591-D | April 16, 1930 |
| 150251 | "My Father Died a Drunkard" | Columbia 15552-D | April 16, 1930 |
| 150252 | "Frankie Dean" | Columbia 15701-D | April 16, 1930 |
| 150263 | "Pork Chops" | Columbia 15611-D | April 17, 1930 |
| 150264 | "On the Banks of a Lonely River" | Columbia 15572-D | April 17, 1930 |
| 150265 | "Faithless Husband" | Columbia 15552-D | April 17, 1930 |
| 150266 | "Hard Time Blues" | Columbia 15611-D | April 17, 1930 |
| 150267 | "Rising Sun Blues" | Columbia 15701-D | April 17, 1930 |
| 150268 | "My Little Blue Heaven" | Columbia 15572-D | April 17, 1930 |
| 71627 | "Thirteen Years In Kilbie Prison" | Victor 23680 | February 28, 1932 |
| 71628 | "Once I Had a Fortune" | Victor 23680 | February 29, 1932 |
| 13432 | "Let's Be Friends Again" | (ARC) Ba 32810 | June 7, 1933 |
| 13433 | "I Long For the Pines" | ARC unissued | June 7, 1933 |
| 13437 | "Black Sheep" | ARC unissued | June 7, 1933 |

=== Jimmie Tarlton ===
| Matrix | Title | Record Cat | Recording date |
|---|---|---|---|
| 151000 | "Careless Love" | Columbia 15651-D | December 3, 1930 |
| 151001 | "By the Old Oaken Bucket Louise" | Columbia 15763-D | December 3, 1930 |
| 151002 | "Lowe Bonnie" | Columbia 15763-D | December 3, 1930 |
| 151003 | "After the Sinking of the Titanic" | Columbia unissued | December 3, 1930 |
| 151004 | "New Birmingham Jail" | Columbia 15629-D | December 3, 1930 |
| 151005 | "Roy Dixon" | Columbia 15629-D | December 3, 1930 |
| 151010 | "Moonshine Blues" | Columbia 15651-D | December 4, 1930 |
| 151011 | "Over the Hills Maggie" | Columbia unissued | December 4, 1930 |
| 71629 | "Dixie Mail" | Victor 23665 | February 29, 1932 |
| 71630 | "The Weaver's Blues" | Victor 23700 | February 29, 1932 |
| 71631 | "Sweetheart of My Dreams" | Victor 23665 | February 29, 1932 |
| 71632 | "Ooze Up To Me" | Victor 23700 | February 29, 1932 |
| 13434 | "Hitch Hike Bums" | ARC unissued | June 7, 1933 |
| 13435 | "By the Old Oaken Bucket Louise" | (ARC) Ba 32810 | June 7, 1933 |
| 13436 | "Baby I Can't Use You" | ARC unissued | June 7, 1933 |

=== The Georgia Wildcats ===
| Matrix | Title | Record Cat | Recording date |
|---|---|---|---|
| 69365 | "She's Waiting For Me (Fort Benning Blues)" | Victor 23640 | May 27, 1931 |
| 69378 | "The Bootlegger Song" | Victor unissued | May 29, 1931 |
| 69379 | "The Monkey Song" | Victor unissued | May 29, 1931 |
| 69380 | "Goin' Down That Lonesome Frisco Line" | Victor 23640 | May 29, 1931 |
| 69398 | "Broke Man Blues" | Victor unissued | May 30, 1931 |
| 69399 | "High Sheriff From Georgia" | Victor unissued | May 30, 1931 |

== Other sources ==
- Darby and Tarlton, Liner notes, Booklet, Bear Family Records
