= I'll Be Seeing You (Jo Stafford album) =

Studio album by Jo Stafford
- Released: February 1959
- Label: Columbia

Jo Stafford chronology
Jo's Greatest Hits (1958)	I'll Be Seeing You (1959)	Ballad of the Blues (1959)

Professional ratings
Review scores
Source	Rating
AllMusic	3/5 stars

I'll Be Seeing You is a 1959 studio album by Jo Stafford. It was re-released in Japan in 1983.

== Track listing ==
1. "I Don't Want To Walk Without You"
2. "It Could Happen To You" (Johnny Burke, Jimmy Van Heusen)
3. "I'll Walk Alone"
4. "I'll Remember April"
5. "We Mustn't Say Goodbye" (James V. Monaco, Al Dubin)
6. "Yesterdays" (Jerome Kern, Otto Harbach) - 3:10
7. No Love No Nothin' (Harry Warren, Leo Robin)
8. "I'll Be Seeing You" (Sammy Fain, Irving Kahal) - 3:30
9. "I Left My Heart At The Stage Door Canteen" (Irving Berlin) - 3:17
10. I Fall In Love Too Easily
11. You'll Never Know
12. I Should Care

== Personnel ==
- Jo Stafford sings on all tracks with an orchestra conducted by Paul Weston
