= Whispering Hope (album) =

Compilation album by Jo Stafford and Gordon MacRae
- Released: April 1962
- Recorded: December 1961-January 1962
- Genre: Inspirational
- Label: Capitol
- Producer: Ralph O'Connor

Jo Stafford and Gordon MacRae chronology
Jo + Jazz (1960)	Whispering Hope (1962)	All Alone (1963)

Professional ratings
Review scores
Source	Rating
AllMusic	3/5 stars

Whispering Hope is a 1962 album by Jo Stafford and Gordon MacRae. The lead song and title track was originally recorded in 1949, reaching No. 4 on the charts.

== Track listing ==
1. "Whispering Hope"
2. "Abide with Me"
3. "In the Garden"
4. "Beyond the Sunset"
5. "Beautiful Isle of Somewhere"
6. "It Is No Secret"
7. "I Found a Friend"
8. "The Old Rugged Cross"
9. "Rock of Ages"
10. "Star of Hope"
11. "Now the Day Is Over"
12. "A Perfect Day"
