= Autumn in New York (Jo Stafford album) =

Studio album by Jo Stafford
- Released: March 1950 [10" LP] [8 track version] 1955 [12" LP] [12 track version]
- Genre: Traditional pop; Jazz
- Length: 22:03 [1950 version] 33:37 [1955 version]
- Label: Capitol; DRG
- Producer: Anaida Garcia; Hugh Fordin; Jim Kelly; Will Friedwald

Jo Stafford chronology
American Folk Songs (1950)	Autumn in New York (1950)	Sunday Evening Songs (1950)

Professional ratings
Review scores
Source	Rating
Allmusic	4.5/5 stars

Autumn in New York is a 1950 album by Jo Stafford, with Paul Weston And His Orchestra. It was later re-released in 1955 and again in 1997.

== Background and Recording ==
Autumn in New York was produced by Anaida Garcia, Hugh Fordin, Jim Kelly, and Will Friedwald. It features Paul Weston and His Orchestra. The album is composed of songs originally written for musical shows, and each track has been featured in one. The album is named after the title track, Autumn in New York, written by Vernon Duke. The song was featured in the musical Thumbs Up!, which opened in 1934.

The album was originally released in 1950 with eight tracks by Capitol Records. It was rereleased in 1955 with four additional tracks. In 1997, the 1955 version of the album was released on CD by EMI, combined with Stafford's 1953 album Starring Jo Stafford.

== Reception ==
Autumn in New York has received mostly positive reviews. Allmusic has given it a 4.5/5 star rating. John Bush of Allmusic said that Stafford "treated [the songs] with the reverence and devotion they deserve." The user reviews for Allmusic have also given it a 4.5/5 star rating, with one user saying, "[Stafford's] intonation carries all the songs to a wonderplace in your heart."

== Track listing ==
=== 1950 Track Listing ===
No.	Title	Writer(s)	Length
1.	"Autumn in New York"	Vernon Duke	2:41
2.	"Smoke Gets in Your Eyes"	Jerome Kern & Otto Harbach	2:47
3.	"Haunted Heart"	Howard Dietz & Arnold Schwartz	2:45
4.	"If I Loved You"	Oscar Hammerstein II & Richard Rodgers	2:57
5.	"Just One of Those Things"	Cole Porter	2:42
6.	"Almost Like Being in Love"	Alan Jay Lerner & Frederick Loewe	2:59
7.	"Make Believe"	Hammerstein & Kern	2:28
8.	"Through the Years"	Edward Heyman & Vincent Youmans	2:40
Total length:			22:03

=== 1955 Track Listing ===
No.	Title	Writer(s)	Length
1.	"Autumn in New York"	Vernon Duke	2:41
2.	"Smoke Gets in Your Eyes"	Jerome Kern & Otto Harbach	2:47
3.	"Haunted Heart"	Howard Dietz & Arnold Schwartz	2:45
4.	"If I Loved You"	Oscar Hammerstein II & Richard Rodgers	2:57
5.	"In the Still of the Night"	Cole Porter	2:42
6.	"Some Enchanted Evening"	Hammerstein & Rodgers	3:14
7.	"Just One of Those Things"	Porter	2:42
8.	"Almost Like Being in Love"	Alan Jay Lerner & Frederick Loewe	2:59
9.	"Make Believe"	Hammerstein & Kern	2:28
10.	"Through the Years"	Edward Heyman & Vincent Youmans	2:40
11.	"The Best Things in Life Are Free"	Buddy DeSylva & Ray Henderson	2:24
12.	"Sometimes I'm Happy"	Irving Caesar & Youmans	3:12
Total length:			33:37
