= 16 Most Requested Songs (Jo Stafford album) =

Compilation album by Jo Stafford
- Released: 16 May 1995
- Genre: Traditional pop
- Label: Sony

Professional ratings
Review scores
Source	Rating
Allmusic	4.5/5 stars

16 Most Requested Songs is a 1995 compilation album of songs recorded by American female singer Jo Stafford.

== Track listing ==
1. "You Belong to Me" (Chilton Price, Pee Wee King, Redd Stewart)
2. "Make Love to Me" (Paul Mann, Stephan Weiss, Kim Gannon)
3. "Keep It a Secret" (Jessie Mae Robinson)
4. "Jambalaya" (Hank Williams, Moon Mullican)
5. "Shrimp Boats" (Paul Mason Howard, Paul Weston)
6. "Hey Good Lookin'" (Hank Williams)
7. "If"
8. "A Fool Such as I" (Bill Trader)
9. "Tennessee Waltz" (Pee Wee King, Redd Stewart)
10. "Teach Me Tonight" (Gene De Paul, Sammy Cahn)
11. "Suddenly There's a Valley" (Chuck Meyer, Biff Jones)
12. "It's Almost Tomorrow" (Gene Adkinson, Wade Buff)
13. "Early Autumn" (Ralph Burns, Woody Herman, Johnny Mercer)
14. "Thank You For Calling, Goodbye" (Cindy Walker)
15. "It is No Secret" (Stuart Hamblen)
16. "Way Down Yonder in New Orleans" (John Turner Layton Jr, Henry Creamer)
