= Songs of Faith (Jo Stafford album) =

Studio album by Jo Stafford
- Released: October 1950
- Genre: Christian

Jo Stafford chronology
Songs for Sunday Evening (1950)	Songs of Faith (1950)	As You Desire Me (1952)

Professional ratings
Review scores
Source	Rating
Allmusic	3/5 stars

Songs of Faith is a 1950 album by Jo Stafford. The album is a collection of hymns and inspirational songs with musical support from the Ravenscroft Quartet.

== Track listing ==
Side one

1. Abide with Me
2. Lead Kindly Light
3. In the Garden
4. Nearer, My God, to Thee

Side two

1. Rock of Ages
2. Battle Hymn of the Republic
3. He Leadeth Me
4. The Old Rugged Cross
