= A Gal Named Jo =

Studio album by Jo Stafford
- Released: 1956
- Label: Columbia

Jo Stafford chronology
Songs of Scotland (1955)	A Gal Named Jo (1956)	Ski Trails (1956)

Professional ratings
Review scores
Source	Rating
Allmusic	3/5 stars

A Gal Named Jo is an album by Jo Stafford, released in 1956 by Columbia Records. Stafford's husband, Paul Weston, serves as conductor and arranger.

== Track listing ==
Side one

1. "Easy Come, Easy Go"
2. "Little Man with a Candy Cigar"
3. "Taking a Chance on Love"

Side two

1. "Dancing on the Ceiling"
2. "Mountain High, Valley Low"
3. "Don't Get Around Much Anymore" - 3:12

== Personnel ==
- Jo Stafford – vocals
