= Jo + Jazz =

Studio album by Jo Stafford
- Released: November 1960
- Genre: Vocal jazz
- Label: Columbia Records; Corinthian Records

Jo Stafford chronology
I'll Be Seeing You (1959)	Jo + Jazz (1960)	Whispering Hope (1962)

Professional ratings
Review scores
Source	Rating
Allmusic	4.5/5 stars
New Record Mirror	4/5
Downbeat	3.5/5 stars

Jo + Jazz is a 1960 album recorded by Jo Stafford on Columbia Records. The album was also re-released in 1993 by Corinthian Records.

For this album, Stafford is backed by a line-up of noted jazz musicians including Conte Candoli, Don Fagerquist, Russ Freeman, Johnny Hodges, Mel Lewis, Ray Nance, Jimmy Rowles and Ben Webster, who were under the orchestration of Johnny Mandel. The album attracted very little attention when it was originally released by Columbia. It was not recognized as a noteworthy jazz album until Corinthian Records, owned by Stafford and her husband, Paul Weston, re-released it.

== Reception ==
Downbeat awarded the release 3.5 stars. John Wilson wrote that Stafford "has been for many years just about the most craftsmanlike pop singer in existence. She has intelligence and taste and an honest voice that she uses honestly —she really sings on Midnight Sun, DayDream, and Just Squeeze Me, for example, instead of sneaking around the tougher parts." Of the setting he writes, "Backing her with small groups studded with jazz musicians is eminently sensible. This is a far better setting for a singer of her type than the heavy, wooden, oversized orchestras that are usually tied to them . . . Ben Webster takes short solos on most of the pieces, playing with relaxed lyricism, while Hodges adds his special kind of lush romanticism to Day Dream and Just Squeeze Me".

== Track listing ==
1. "Just Squeeze Me (But Please Don't Tease Me)" (Duke Ellington, Lee Gaines) - 2:57
2. "For You" (Al Dubin, Joe Burke) - 2:55
3. "Midnight Sun" (Lionel Hampton, Sonny Burke, Johnny Mercer) - 4:37
4. "You'd Be So Nice to Come Home To" (Cole Porter) - 3:23
5. "The Folks Who Live On the Hill" (Jerome Kern, Oscar Hammerstein II) - 3:32
6. "I Didn't Know About You" (Duke Ellington, Bob Russell) - 3:30
7. "What Can I Say After I Say I'm Sorry?" (Walter Donaldson, Abe Lyman) - 3:08
8. "Dream of You" (Jimmie Lunceford, Edward P . Moran, Sy Oliver) - 2:47
9. "Imagination" (Jimmy Van Heusen, J. Burke) - 3:49
10. "S'posin" (Andy Razaf, Paul Denniker) - 2:48
11. "Day Dream" (Ellington, Billy Strayhorn, John La Touche) - 4:27
12. "I've Got the World on a String" (Harold Arlen, Ted Koehler) - 3:38
