= As You Desire Me (Jo Stafford album) =

Studio album by Jo Stafford
- Released: June 1952
- Recorded: December 10, 1951–February 19, 1952
- Genre: Traditional pop
- Label: Columbia

Jo Stafford chronology
Songs of Faith (1950)	As You Desire Me (1952)	Broadway's Best (1953)

Professional ratings
Review scores
Source	Rating
Allmusic	3/5 stars

As You Desire Me is an album by Jo Stafford, released by Columbia Records as a 10" long-playing record (catalog number CL-6210), a box set of 45-rpm records (catalog number 39720), and a two-EP set (catalog number B 298), in 1952.

Track number	Song	Songwriter(s)	Recording date	Length
1	"As You Desire Me"	Allie Wrubel	February 19, 1952	2:28
2	"Don't Worry 'bout Me"	Rube Bloom/Ted Koehler	December 10, 1951	3:01
3	"Something to Remember You By"	Arthur Schwartz/Howard Dietz	January 18, 1952	3:07
4	"Spring Is Here"	Richard Rodgers/Lorenz Hart	February 19, 1952	2:50
5	"Easy Come, Easy Go"	Edward Heyman/John W. Green	December 10, 1951	3:38
6	"September in the Rain"	Harry Warren/Al Dubin	January 18, 1952	2:54
7	"Blue Moon"	Richard Rodgers/Lorenz Hart	February 19, 1952	2:33
8	"I'm in the Mood for Love"	Jimmy McHugh/Dorothy Fields	January 18, 1952	3:30
