= Songs of Scotland =

Jo Stafford Sings Songs of Scotland

Studio album by Jo Stafford
- Released: October 1957
- Genre: Folk
- Label: Columbia; Capitol; Corinthian

Jo Stafford chronology
Soft and Sentimental (1955)	Jo Stafford Sings Songs of Scotland (1957)	A Gal Named Jo (1956)

Professional ratings
Review scores
Source	Rating
Allmusic	4/5 stars

Jo Stafford Sings Songs of Scotland is a 1957 album by Jo Stafford. It was released in October 1957 on the Columbia label and features Stafford backed by the Paul Weston Orchestra. Some of the tracks come from the 1954 album Songs of Scotland.The lyrics are all taken from traditional Scottish poetry, many from the work of Robert Burns, with the music written by Alton Rinker.

Stafford and Weston re-joined Capitol Records in 1961. The album was later released by Weston and Stafford's own record label, Corinthian.

== Track listing ==
Side one

1. My Heart's in the Highlands
2. John Anderson, My Jo
3. Flow Gently Sweet Afton
4. Ye Banks and Braes of Bonnie Doon
5. Molly's Meek, Molly's Sweet
6. Comin' Through the Rye

Side two

1. My Love Is Like a Red, Red Rose
2. Green Grow the Rashes, O
3. Annie Laurie
4. My Jean
5. The Bonnie Lad That's Far Away
6. Auld Lang Syne
