= Getting Sentimental over Tommy Dorsey =

Studio album by Jo Stafford
- Released: June 1963
- Genre: Traditional pop
- Labels: Reprise (1963); Collectables (2002)

Jo Stafford chronology
The Joyful Season (1964)	Getting Sentimental over Tommy Dorsey (1963)	Do I Hear a Waltz? (1965)

Professional ratings
Review scores
Source	Rating
Allmusic	4.5/5 stars
New Record Mirror	4/5 stars

Getting Sentimental over Tommy Dorsey is a 1963 album by Jo Stafford. The album was recorded in 1963 and features eleven easy listening classic songs associated with the bandleader Tommy Dorsey. Stafford is accompanied on this album by Nelson Riddle, Billy May and Benny Carter. The album was originally released by Reprise Records, then reissued on CD in 2002 on the Collectables label. Collectables then reissued it again in 2008 as part of a three CD set along with The Best of Jo Stafford and Jo Stafford and Friends. The album was released by Valiant Records in 1963 with the title All Alone and again in the 1970s and 1980s by various record labels, under the title Look At Me Now. This album contains the version of "Whatcha Know Joe" that was featured in the 1993 movie, Dennis the Menace.

== Track listing ==
=== Side 1 ===
1. "The One I Love (Belongs to Somebody Else)" - 2:44
2. "I'll Never Smile Again " - 3:20
3. "Oh! Look at Me Now!" - 2:25
4. "Who Can I Turn To?" - 3:25
5. "There Are Such Things" - 2:58
6. "I'll Take Tallulah" - 2:50 (Burton Lane - Yip Harburg)

=== Side 2 ===
1. "Let's Get Away from It All" - 2:44
2. "It Started All Over Again" - 3:13
3. "Whatcha Know Joe" - 2:41 (James Young)
4. "The Night We Called It a Day" - 3:33
5. "Yes, Indeed" - 2:34 (with Sammy Davis Jr.)
