= Broadway's Best (album) =

Studio album by Jo Stafford
- Released: January 1953
- Genre: traditional pop
- Label: Columbia

Jo Stafford chronology
As You Desire Me (1952)	Broadway's Best (1953)	Starring Jo Stafford (1953)

Professional ratings
Review scores
Source	Rating
Allmusic	3/5 stars

Broadway's Best is an album by Jo Stafford, released in 1953 by Columbia Records. Stafford sings songs from famous Broadway shows backed by Paul Weston and his Orchestra. This album by Columbia was never re-released on compact disc. An MP3 album was issued in 2008.

== Track listing ==
Side one

1. "Come Rain or Come Shine" (Harold Arlen, Johnny Mercer) - 3:13
2. "They Say It's Wonderful" (Irving Berlin) - 3:14
3. "My Romance" (Richard Rodgers, Lorenz Hart) - 3:23
4. "Dancing in the Dark" (Arthur Schwartz, Howard Dietz) - 2:39
5. "Spring Is Here" (Richard Rodgers, Lorenz Hart) - 2:50
6. "I'm Your Girl" (Richard Rodgers, Oscar Hammerstein II)

Side two

1. "Embraceable You" (George Gershwin, Ira Gershwin) - 2:34
2. "September Song" (Kurt Weill, Maxwell Anderson) - 3:22
3. "Something to Remember You By" (Arthur Schwartz, Howard Dietz) - 3:07
4. "All the Things You Are" (Jerome Kern, Oscar Hammerstein II) - 3:05
5. "Make the Man Love Me" (Arthur Schwartz, Dorothy Fields)
6. "Night and Day" (Cole Porter)
