= Jo Stafford =

American singer (1917–2008)

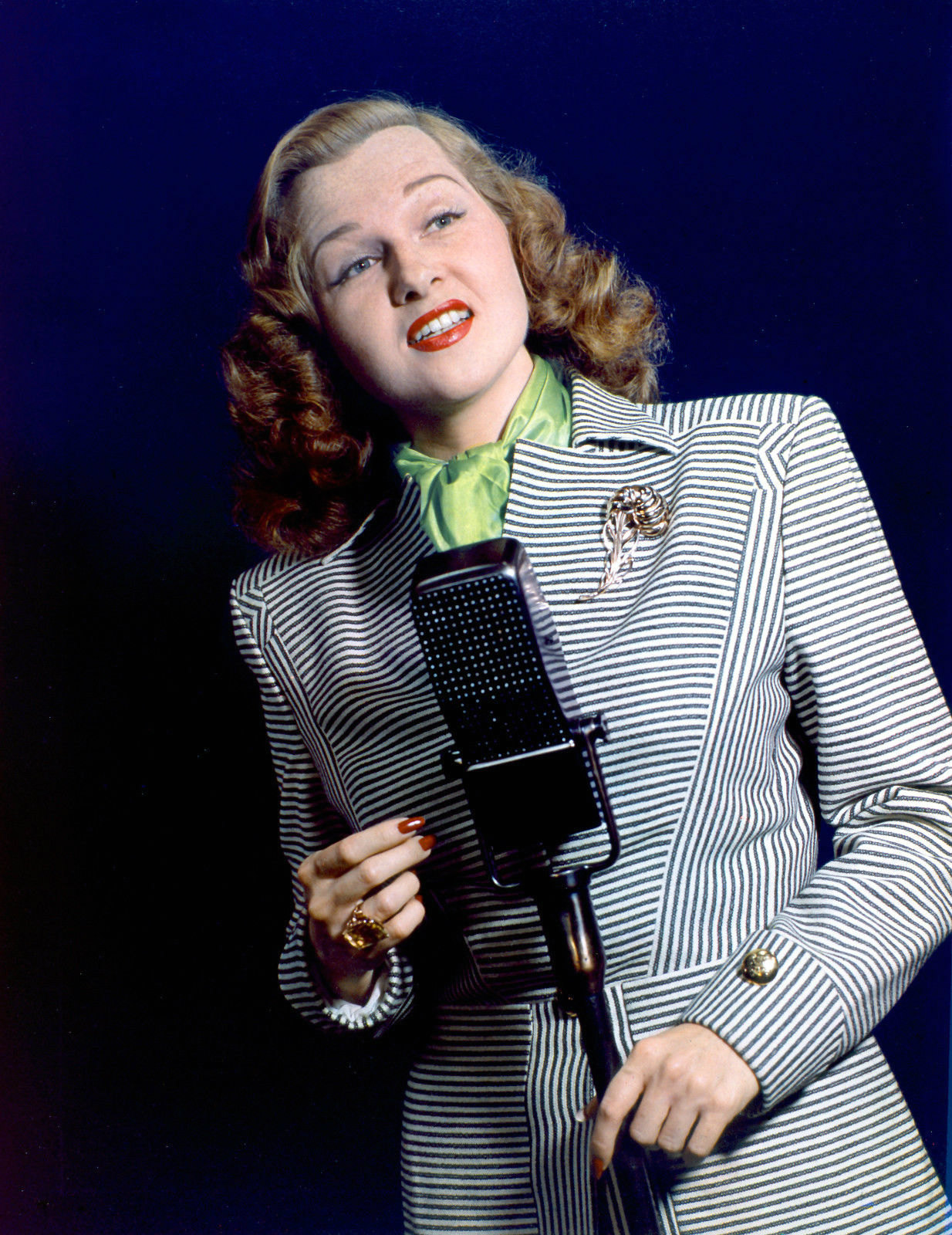
- Picture of Stafford from the New York Sunday News, September 21, 1947

Background information
- Born: Jo Elizabeth Stafford; November 12, 1917; Coalinga, California, U.S.
- Died: July 16, 2008 (aged 90) Los Angeles, California, U.S.
- Genres: Traditional pop
- Occupation: Singer
- Years active: 1930s–1982
- Labels: Capitol; Columbia; Dot; Corinthian
- Spouse(s): John Huddleston (m. 1937; div. 1943) Paul Weston (m. 1952; died 1996)

Jo Elizabeth Stafford (November 12, 1917 – July 16, 2008) was an American traditional pop singer, whose career spanned five decades from the late 1930s to the early 1980s. Admired for the purity of her voice, she originally underwent classical training to become an opera singer before following a career in popular music and by 1955 had achieved more worldwide record sales than any other female artist. Her 1952 song "You Belong to Me" topped the charts in the United States and United Kingdom, becoming the second single to top the UK Singles Chart and the first by a female artist to do so.

Born in remote oil-rich Coalinga, California, near Fresno in the San Joaquin Valley, Stafford made her first musical appearance at age 12. While still at high school, she joined her two older sisters to form a vocal trio named the Stafford Sisters, who found moderate success on radio and in film. In 1938, while the sisters were part of the cast of Twentieth Century Fox's production of Alexander's Ragtime Band, Stafford met the future members of the Pied Pipers and became the group's lead singer. Bandleader Tommy Dorsey hired them in 1939 to perform vocals with his orchestra. From 1940 to 1942, the group often performed with Dorsey's new male singer, Frank Sinatra.

In addition to her singing with the Pied Pipers, Stafford was featured in solo performances with Dorsey. After leaving the group in 1944, she recorded a series of pop songs now regarded as standards for Capitol Records and Columbia Records. Many of her recordings were backed by the orchestra of Paul Weston. She also performed duets with Gordon MacRae and Frankie Laine. Her work with the United Service Organizations giving concerts for soldiers during World War II earned her the nickname "G.I. Jo". Starting in 1945, Stafford was a regular host of the National Broadcasting Company (NBC) radio series The Chesterfield Supper Club and later appeared in television specials—including two series called The Jo Stafford Show, in 1954 in the U.S. and in 1961 in the UK.

Stafford married twice, first in 1937 to musician John Huddleston (the couple divorced in 1943), then in 1952 to Paul Weston, with whom she had two children. She and Weston developed a comedy routine in which they assumed the identity of an incompetent lounge act named Jonathan and Darlene Edwards, parodying well-known songs. The act proved popular at parties and among the wider public when the couple released an album as the Edwardses in 1957. In 1961, the album Jonathan and Darlene Edwards in Paris won Stafford her only Grammy Award for Best Comedy Album and was the first commercially successful parody album. Stafford largely retired as a performer in the mid-1960s, but continued in the music business. She had a brief resurgence in popularity in the late 1970s when she recorded a cover of the Bee Gees hit, "Stayin' Alive" as Darlene Edwards. In the 1990s, she began re-releasing some of her material through Corinthian Records, a label founded by Weston. She died in 2008 in Century City, Los Angeles, and is interred with Weston at Holy Cross Cemetery, Culver City. Her work in radio, television, and music is recognized by three stars on the Hollywood Walk of Fame.

== Early years ==
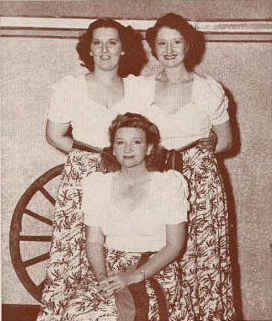
The singing Stafford Sisters in 1941

Jo Elizabeth Stafford was born in Coalinga, California, in 1917, to Grover Cleveland Stafford and Anna Stafford (née York)—a second cousin of World War I hero Sergeant Alvin York. (Note: There is some disagreement about her birth name. The radio historian Jim Cox gives it as Jocinta Elizabeth Stafford, while some obituary writers—such as The Guardian's Veronica Horwell— suggest it was Josephine. Other authors, including the music biographer Gene Lees refer to her as Jo.) She was the third of four children. She had two older sisters, Christine and Pauline, and one younger sister, Betty. Both her parents enjoyed singing and sharing music with their family. Stafford's father hoped for success in the California oil fields when he moved his family from Gainesboro, Tennessee, but worked in a succession of unrelated jobs. Her mother was an accomplished banjo player, playing and singing many of the folk songs that influenced Stafford's later career. Anna insisted that her children should take piano lessons, but Jo was the only one among her sisters who took a keen interest in it, and through this, she learned to read music.

Stafford's first public singing appearance was in Long Beach, where the family lived when she was 12. She sang "Believe Me, If All Those Endearing Young Charms", a Stafford family favorite. Her second was far more dramatic. As a student at Long Beach Polytechnic High School with the lead in the school musical, she was rehearsing on stage when the 1933 Long Beach earthquake destroyed part of the school. With her mother's encouragement, Stafford originally planned to become an opera singer and studied voice as a child, taking private lessons from Foster Rucker, an announcer on California radio station KNX. (Note: Rucker later changed his name to Galen Drake.) Because of the Great Depression, she abandoned that idea and joined her older sisters Christine and Pauline in a popular vocal group the Stafford Sisters. The two older Staffords were already part of a trio with an unrelated third member when the act got a big booking at Long Beach's West Coast Theater. Pauline was too ill to perform, and Jo was drafted in to take her place so they could keep the engagement. She asked her glee club teacher for a week's absence from school, saying her mother needed her at home, and this was granted. The performance was a success, and Jo became a permanent member of the group. (Note: When Stafford graduated from high school, her teacher wrote in her autograph book, "I'll never forget how much I enjoyed your singing the week mama needed you home to help her.")

The Staffords' first radio appearance was on Los Angeles station KHJ as part of The Happy Go Lucky Hour when Jo was 16, a role they secured after hopefuls at the audition were asked if they had their own musical accompanist(s). Christine Stafford said that Jo played piano, and the sisters were hired, though she had not previously given a public piano performance. The Staffords were subsequently heard on KNX's The Singing Crockett Family of Kentucky, and California Melodies, a network radio show aired on the Mutual Broadcasting System. While Stafford worked on The Jack Oakie Show, she met John Huddleston—a backing singer on the program, and they were married in October 1937. (Note: Although sources such as The Independent and The Boston Globe date the marriage as occurring in 1941, a Radio Mirror article published in 1938 mentions their marriage, meaning they had to be married by that year. Marriage license No. 20615, issued by the State of California, shows the couple married on October 15, 1937. Copies of the document can be viewed at Wikimedia Commons here and here.) The couple divorced in 1943.

The sisters found work in the film industry as backup vocalists, and immediately after graduating from high school, Jo worked on film soundtracks. The Stafford Sisters made their first recording,"Let's Get Together and Swing" with Louis Prima, in 1936. In 1937, Jo worked behind the scenes with Fred Astaire on the soundtrack of A Damsel in Distress, creating the arrangements for the film, and with her sisters she arranged the backing vocals for "Nice Work If You Can Get It". Stafford said that her arrangement had to be adapted because Astaire had difficulty with some of the syncopation. In her words: "The man with the syncopated shoes couldn't do the syncopated notes".

== The Pied Pipers ==
By 1938, the Staffords were involved with Twentieth Century Fox's production of Alexander's Ragtime Band. The studio brought in many vocal groups to work on the film, including the Four Esquires, the Rhythm Kings, and the King Sisters, who began to sing and socialize between takes. The Stafford Sisters, the Four Esquires and the Rhythm Kings became a new vocal group called the Pied Pipers. Stafford later said, "We started singing together just for fun, and these sessions led to the formation of an eight-voice singing group that we christened 'The Pied Pipers'". The group consisted of eight members, including Stafford—John Huddleston, Hal Hooper, Chuck Lowry, Bud Hervey, George Tait, Woody Newbury, and Dick Whittinghill.

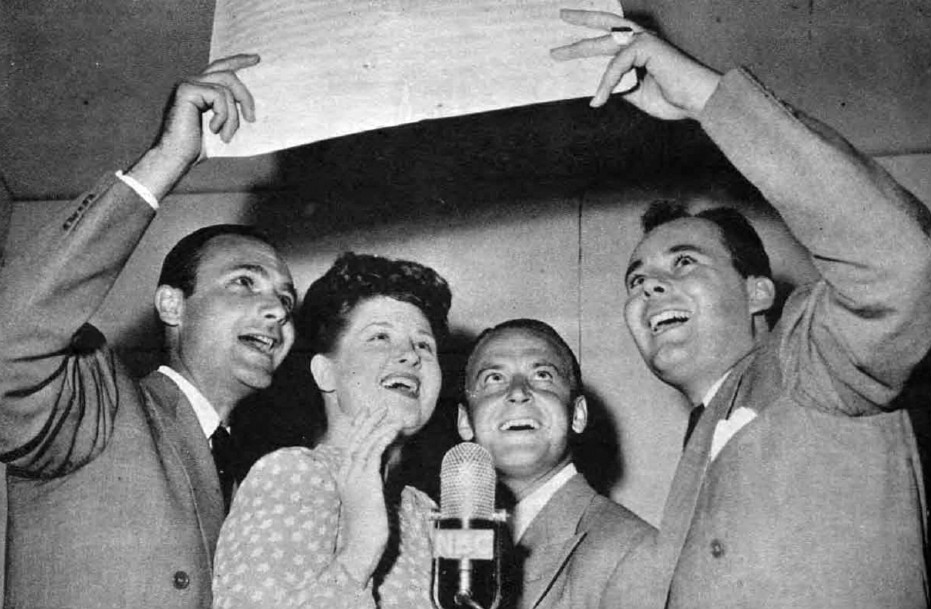
The Pied Pipers in 1944: Pictured here are Charles Lowry, Jo Stafford, Clark Yocum, and John Huddleston.

As the Pied Pipers, they worked on local radio and movie soundtracks. When Alyce and Yvonne King threw a party for their boyfriends' visit to Los Angeles, the group was invited to perform. The King Sisters' boyfriends were Tommy Dorsey's arrangers Axel Stordahl and Paul Weston, who became interested in the group. Weston said the group's vocals were unique for its time and that their vocal arrangements were much like those for orchestral instruments.

Weston persuaded Dorsey to audition the group in 1938, and the eight drove together to New York City. Dorsey liked them and signed them for 10 weeks. After their second broadcast, the sponsor visiting from overseas heard the group sing "Hold Tight (Want Some Seafood Mama)". Until this point, the sponsor knew only that he was paying for Dorsey's program and that its ratings were very good; transcription discs mailed to him by his advertising agency always arrived broken. He thought that the performance was terrible and successfully pressured the advertising agency representing his brand to fire the group. They stayed in New York for several months, landing one job that paid them $3.60 each, and they recorded some material for RCA Victor Records. Weston later said that Stordahl and he felt responsibility for the group, since Weston had arranged their audition with Dorsey. After six months in New York and with no work there for them, the Pied Pipers returned to Los Angeles, where four of their members left the group to seek regular employment. Shortly afterwards, Stafford received a telephone call from Dorsey, who told her he wished to hire the group but wanted only four of them, including Stafford. After she agreed to the offer, the remaining Pied Pipers—Stafford, Huddleston, Lowry, and Wilson—traveled to Chicago in 1939. The decision led to success for the group, especially Stafford, who featured in both collective and solo performances with Dorsey's orchestra.

When Frank Sinatra joined the Dorsey band, he and the Pied Pipers often performed together on songs, alternating between his solos and him singing with the group. Sometimes they both had solos as well as being in the group. Stafford commented that he was very careful to blend his voice with theirs when singing with them. Their version of "I'll Never Smile Again" topped the Billboard Chart for 12 weeks in 1940 and helped to establish Sinatra as a singer. Stafford, Sinatra, and the Pied Pipers toured extensively with Dorsey during their three years as part of his orchestra, giving concerts at venues across the United States. Stafford made her first solo recording—"Little Man with a Candy Cigar"—in 1941, after Dorsey agreed to her request to record solo. Her public debut as a soloist with the band occurred at New York's Hotel Astor in May 1942. Bill Davidson of Collier's reported in 1951 that because Stafford weighed in excess of 180 lb, Dorsey was reluctant to give her a leading vocal role in his orchestra, believing she was not sufficiently glamorous for the part. However, Peter Levinson's 2005 biography of Dorsey offers a different account. Stafford recalls that she was overweight, but Dorsey did not try hiding her because of it.

In November 1942, the Pied Pipers had a disagreement with Dorsey when he fired Clark Yocum, a guitarist and vocalist who had replaced Billy Wilson in the lineup, when he mistakenly gave the bandleader misdirections at a railroad station in Portland, Oregon. The remaining three members then quit in an act of solidarity. At the time, the number-one song in the United States was "There Are Such Things" by Frank Sinatra and the Pied Pipers. Sinatra also left Dorsey that year. Following their departure from the orchestra, the Pied Pipers played a series of vaudeville dates in the Eastern United States. When they returned to California, they were signed to appear in the 1943 Universal Pictures movie Gals Incorporated. From there, they joined the NBC Radio show Bob Crosby and Company. In addition to working with Bob Crosby, they also appeared on radio shows hosted by Sinatra and Johnny Mercer and were one of the first groups signed to Mercer's new label, Capitol Records, which was founded in 1942. Weston, who left Dorsey's band in 1940 to work with Dinah Shore, became music director at Capitol.

== Solo career ==
=== Capitol Records and United Service Organization ===
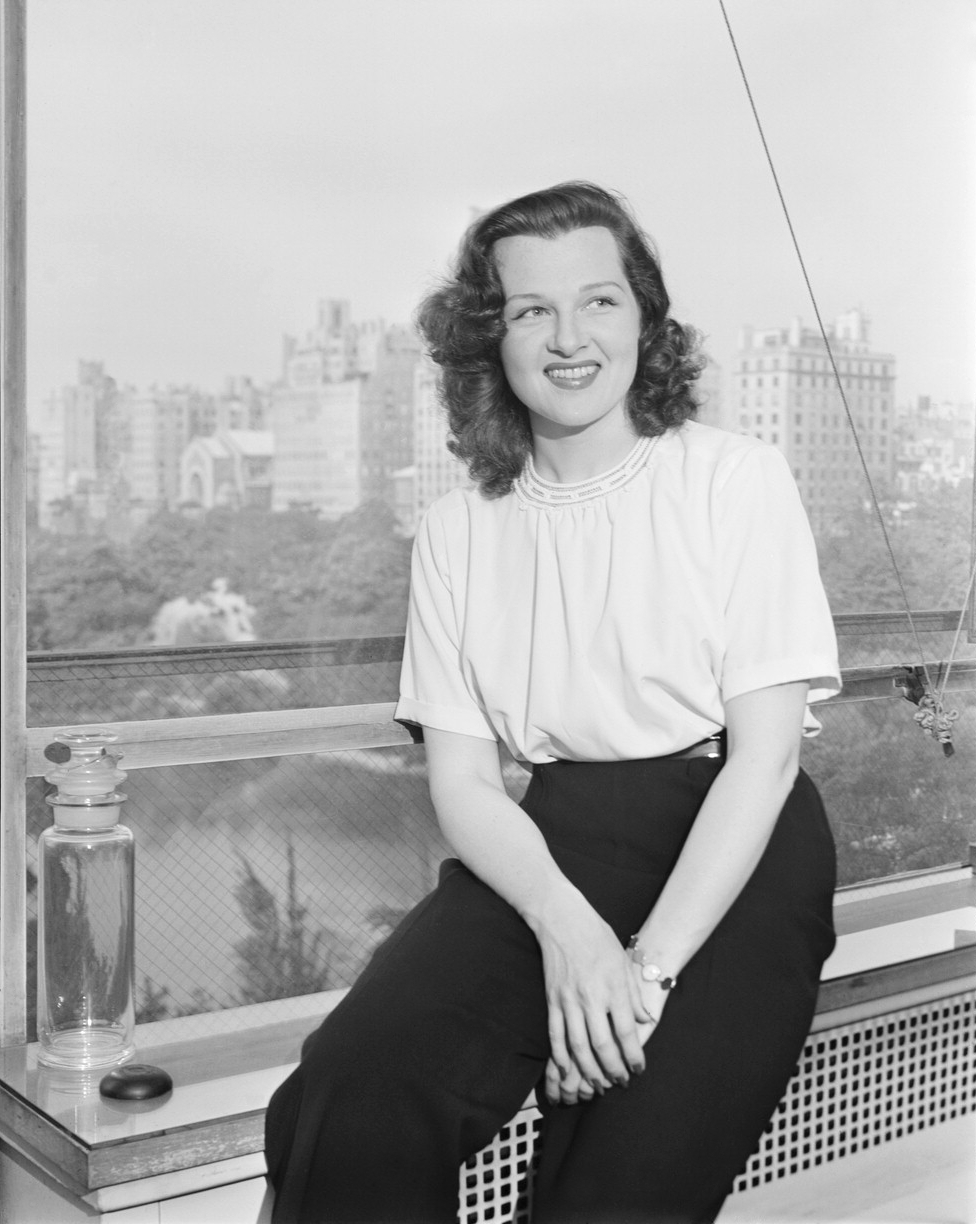
Jo Stafford, 1946

While Stafford was still working for Dorsey, Johnny Mercer told her, "Some day I'm going to have my own record company, and you're going to record for me." She subsequently became the first solo artist signed to Capitol after leaving the Pied Pipers in 1944. A key figure in helping Stafford to develop her solo career was Mike Nidorf, an agent who first heard her as a member of the Pied Pipers while he was serving as a captain in the United States Army. Having previously discovered artists such as Glenn Miller, Artie Shaw, and Woody Herman, Nidorf was impressed by Stafford's voice and contacted her when he was demobilized in 1944. After she agreed to let him represent her, he encouraged her to reduce her weight and arranged a string of engagements that raised her profile and confidence.

The success of Stafford's solo career led to a demand for personal appearances, and in February 1945, she embarked on a six-month residency at New York's La Martinique nightclub. Her performance was well-received; an article in the July 1945 edition of Band Leaders magazine described it as "sensational", but Stafford did not enjoy singing before live audiences, and it was the only nightclub venue she ever played. Speaking about her discomfort with live performances, Stafford told a 1996 interview with The New Yorker's Nancy Franklin, "I'm basically a singer, period, and I think I'm really lousy up in front of an audience—it's just not me."

Stafford's tenure with the United Service Organizations during World War II, which often had her perform for soldiers stationed in the U.S., led to her acquiring the nickname "G.I. Jo". On returning from the Pacific theater, a veteran told Stafford that the Japanese would play her records on loudspeakers in an attempt to make the U.S. troops homesick enough to surrender. She replied personally to all the letters she received from servicemen. Stafford was a favorite of many servicemen during both World War II and the Korean War; her recordings received extensive airplay on the American Forces radio and in some military hospitals at lights-out. Stafford's involvement with servicemen led to an interest in military history and a sound knowledge of it. Years after World War II, Stafford was a guest at a dinner party with a retired naval officer. When the discussion turned to a wartime action off Mindanao, the officer tried to correct Stafford, who held to her point. He countered her by saying, "Madame, I was there". A few days after the party, Stafford received a note of apology from him, saying he had reread his logs and that she was correct.

=== Chesterfield Supper Club, duets, and Voice of America ===
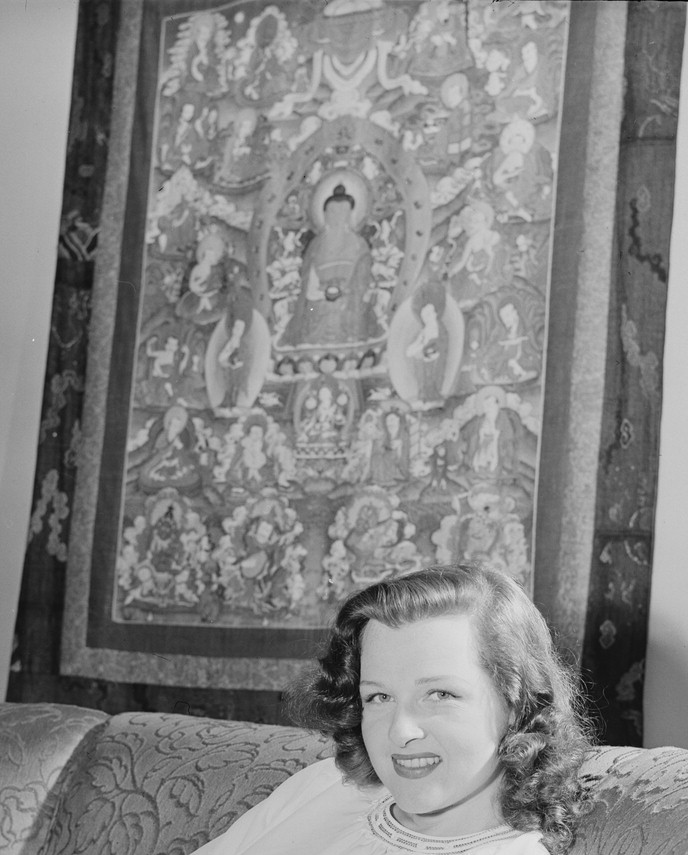
Jo Stafford with Tibetan buddhist thangka art from Tibet in 1946 New York City

Beginning on December 11, 1945, Stafford hosted the Tuesday and Thursday broadcasts of NBC musical variety radio program The Chesterfield Supper Club. On April 5, 1946, the entire cast, including Stafford and Perry Como, participated in the first commercial radio broadcast from an airplane. The initial plan was to use the stand-held microphones used in studios, but when these proved to be problematic, the cast switched to hand-held microphones, which because of the plane's cabin pressure became difficult to hold. Three flights were made that day; a rehearsal in the afternoon, then two in the evening—one for the initial 6:00 pm broadcast and another at 10:00 pm for the West Coast broadcast.

Stafford moved from New York to California in November 1946, continuing to host Chesterfield Supper Club from Hollywood. In 1948, she restricted her appearances on the show to Tuesdays, and Peggy Lee hosted the Thursday broadcasts. Stafford left the show when it was expanded to 30 minutes, making her final appearance on September 2, 1949. She returned to the program in 1954; it ended its run on NBC Radio the following year. During her time with Chesterfield Supper Club, Stafford revisited some of the folk music she had enjoyed as a child. Weston, her conductor on the program, suggested using some of the folk music for the show. With her renewed interest in folk tunes came an interest in folklore; Stafford established a contest to award a prize to the best collection of American folklore submitted by a college student. The annual Jo Stafford Prize for American Folklore was handled by the American Folklore Society, with the first prize of $250 awarded in 1949.

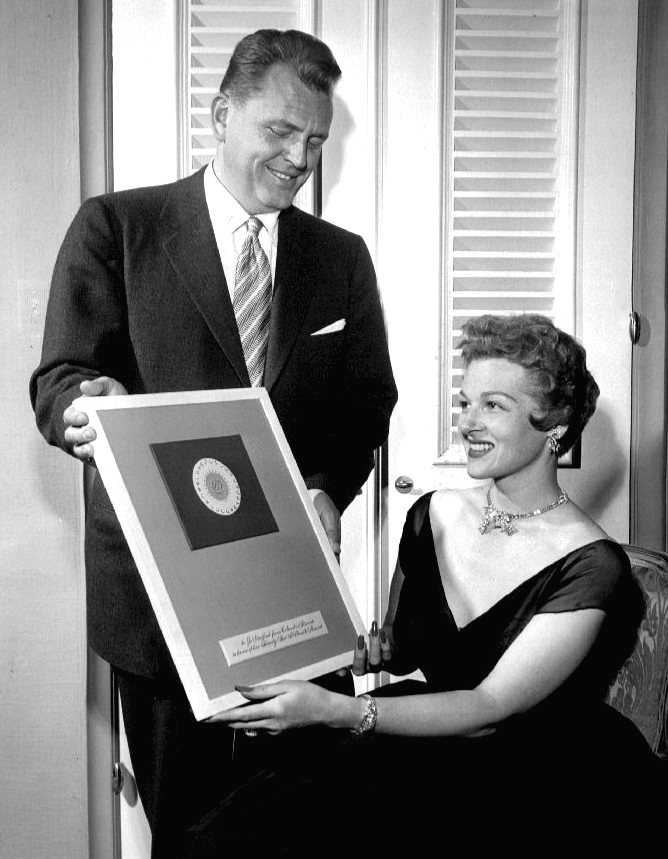
In 1954, James Conkling, president of Columbia Records, presented Stafford with a diamond-studded plaque to mark the sale of 25 million of her records.

Stafford continued to record. She duetted with Gordon MacRae on a number of songs. In 1948, their version of "Say Something Sweet to Your Sweetheart" sold over a million copies. The following year, they repeated their success with "My Happiness", and Stafford and MacRae recorded "Whispering Hope" together. Stafford began hosting a weekly program on Radio Luxembourg in 1950; working unpaid, she recorded the voice portions of the shows in Hollywood. At the time, she was hosting Club Fifteen with Bob Crosby for CBS Radio.

Weston moved from Capitol to Columbia Records, and in 1950, Stafford followed suit. Content and very comfortable working with him, Stafford had had a clause inserted in her contract with Capitol stating that if Weston left that label, she would automatically be released from her obligations to them. When that happened, Capitol wanted Stafford to record eight more songs before December 15, 1950, and she found herself in the unusual situation of simultaneously working for two competing record companies, an instance that was very rare in an industry where musicians were seen as assets. In 1954, Stafford became the second artist after Bing Crosby to sell 25 million records for Columbia. She was presented with a diamond-studded disc to mark the occasion.

In 1950, Stafford began working for Voice of America (VOA), the U.S. government broadcaster transmitting programmes overseas to undermine the influence of communism. She presented a weekly show that aired in Eastern Europe, and Collier's published an article about the program in its April 21, 1951, issue that discussed her worldwide popularity, including in countries behind the Iron Curtain. The article, titled "Jo Stafford: Her Songs Upset Joe Stalin", earned her the wrath of the U.S. Communist Daily Worker newspaper, which published a column critical of Stafford and VOA. (Note: The newspaper dismissed Voice of America as "one of the standing jokes of Europe" and criticized Stafford for her "average earnings of $300,000, just like the rest of us hometown girls with our chintz aprons and chocolate cookie recipes".)

=== Marriage to Paul Weston and later career ===
Although Stafford and Paul Weston had known each other since their introduction at the King Sisters' party, they did not become romantically involved until 1945, when Weston traveled to New York to see Stafford perform at La Martinique. They were married in a Roman Catholic ceremony on February 26, 1952, before which Stafford converted to Catholicism. (Note: Because of Stafford's status as a divorcee, Weston and she had to apply for permission to marry in a Catholic church.) The wedding was conducted at St Gregory's Catholic Church in Los Angeles by Father Joe Kearney, a former guitarist with the Bob Crosby band, who left the music business, trained as a priest, and served as head of the Catholic Labor Institute. The couple left for Europe for a combined honeymoon and business trip: Stafford had an engagement at the London Palladium. Stafford and Weston had two children; Tim was born in 1952 and Amy in 1956. Both children followed their parents into the music industry. Tim Weston became an arranger and producer who took charge of Corinthian Records, his father's music label, and Amy Weston became a session singer, performing with a trio, Daddy's Money, and singing in commercials.

"You Belong to Me"
Stafford's biggest hit topped the charts in both the United States and the United Kingdom. With this recording she became the first female singer to top the chart in the UK.

In the 1950s, Stafford had a string of popular hits with Frankie Laine, six of which charted. Their duet of the Hank Williams song "Hey Good Lookin'" made the top 10 in 1951. She had her best-known hits—"Jambalaya", "Shrimp Boats", "Make Love to Me", and "You Belong to Me"—around this time. "You Belong to Me" was Stafford's biggest hit, topping the charts in the United States and the United Kingdom. In the UK, it was the first song by a female singer to top the chart. The record first appeared on U.S. charts on August 1, 1952, and remained there for 24 weeks. In the UK, it entered the charts on November 14, 1952, at number 2, reached number one on January 16, 1953, and stayed on the charts for 19 weeks. In a July 1953 interview, Paul Weston said his wife's big hit was really the "B" side of the single "Pretty Boy", which both Weston and Columbia Records believed would be the big seller.

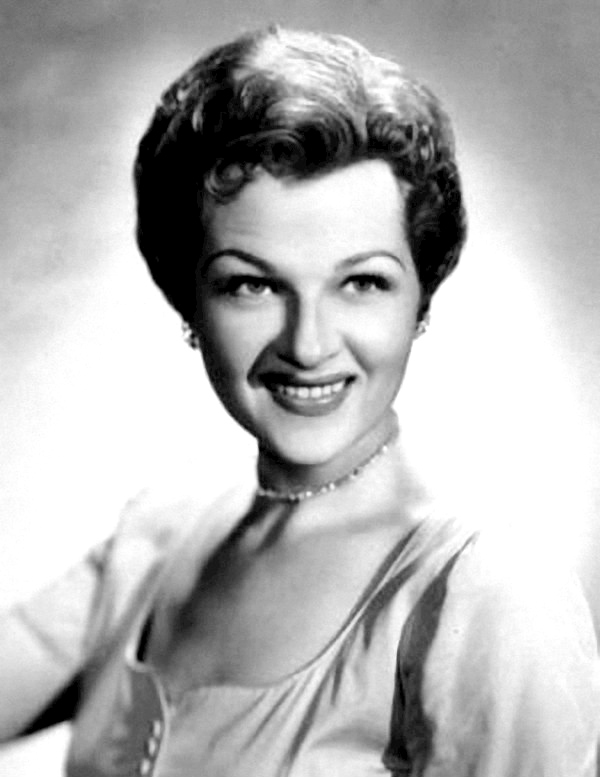
Publicity photo for The Jo Stafford Show, 1954

In 1953, Stafford signed a four-year $1 million deal with CBS-TV. She hosted the 15-minute The Jo Stafford Show on CBS from 1954 to 1955, with Weston as her conductor and music arranger. She appeared on NBC's Club Oasis in 1958, and on the ABC series The Pat Boone Chevy Showroom in 1959. In the early 1960s, Stafford hosted a series of television specials called The Jo Stafford Show, which were centered around music. The shows were produced in England and featured British and American guests including Claire Bloom, Stanley Holloway, Ella Fitzgerald, Mel Tormé, and Rosemary Clooney.

Both Stafford and Weston returned to Capitol in 1961. During her second stint at Capitol, Stafford also recorded for Sinatra's label Reprise Records. The albums issued by Reprise were released between 1961 and 1964, and were mostly remakes of songs from her past. Sinatra sold Reprise to Warner Bros. in 1963, and they retargeted the label at a teenage audience, letting go many of the original artists who had signed up with Sinatra. In late 1965, both Stafford and Weston signed to Dot Records.

== Comedy performances ==
During the 1940s, Stafford briefly performed comedy songs under the name "Cinderella G. Stump" with Red Ingle and the Natural Seven. In 1947, she recorded a hillbilly-style parody of "Temptation", pronouncing its title "Tim-tayshun". Stafford created Stump after Weston suggested her for the role when Ingle said his female vocalist was unavailable for the recording session. After meeting Ingle at a recording studio, she gave an impromptu performance. The speed of her voice was intentionally increased for the song, giving it the hillbilly sound, and the listening public did not initially know that her voice was on the record. Because it was a lighthearted, impromptu performance and she accepted the standard scale pay, Stafford waived all royalties from the record. Stafford, along with Ingle and Weston, made a personal appearance tour in 1949, and she performed "Temptation" as Cinderella G. Stump. Stafford and Ingle performed the song on network television in 1960 for Startime. Stafford recorded a second song with Ingle in 1948. "The Prisoner of Love's Song" was a parody of "Prisoner of Love", and featured in an advertisement for Capitol releases in the January 8, 1949, edition of Billboard magazine.

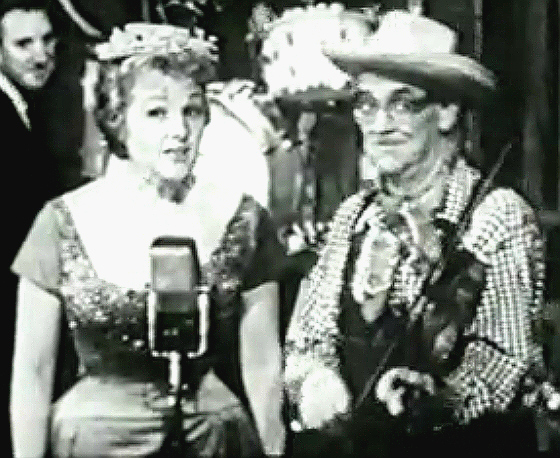
Jo Stafford as Cinderella G. Stump with Red Ingle performing their 1947 song, "Tim-Tay-Shun", on Startime in 1960

Throughout the 1950s, Stafford and Weston entertained party guests by performing skits in which they impersonated a poor lounge act. Stafford sang off-key in a high pitched voice and Weston played songs on the piano in unconventional rhythms. Weston began his impression of an unskilled pianist in or around 1955, assuming the guise "when things got a little quiet, or when people began taking themselves too seriously at a Hollywood party." He put on an impromptu performance of the act the following year at a Columbia Records sales convention in Key West, Florida, after hearing a particularly bad hotel pianist. The audience was very appreciative of his rendition of "Stardust", particularly Columbia executives George Avakian and Irving Townsend, who encouraged Weston to make an album of such songs. Avakian named Weston's character Jonathan Edwards, for the 18th century Calvinist preacher of the same name, and asked him to record under this alias. Weston worried that he might not be able to find enough material for an entire album, and he asked his wife to join the project. Stafford named her off-key vocalist persona Darlene Edwards.

Stafford's creation of Darlene Edwards had its roots in the novelty songs that Mitch Miller, the head of Columbia's artists and repertoire department, had been selecting for her to sing. These included songs such as "Underneath the Overpass", and because she did not agree with Miller's music choices for her, Stafford and her studio musicians often recorded their own renditions of the music, performing the songs according to their feelings about them. Because she had some unused studio time at a 1957 recording session, as a joke Stafford recorded a track as Darlene Edwards. Those who heard bootlegs of the recording responded positively, and later that year, Stafford and Weston recorded an album of songs as Jonathan and Darlene, entitled The Piano Artistry of Jonathan Edwards.

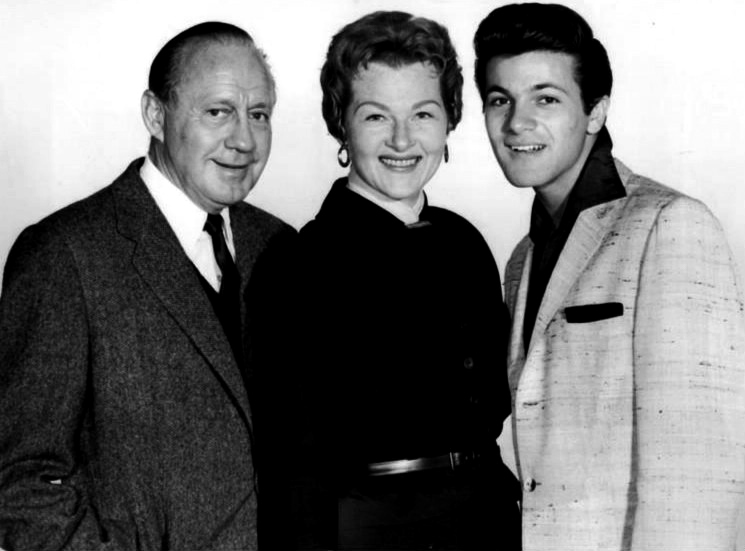
Photo of Jo Stafford from Shower of Stars where she appeared as Darlene Edwards; also pictured are Jack Benny and singer Tommy Sands

"Paris in the Spring"
An excerpt from one of the tracks on the Grammy Award-winning comedy album Jonathan and Darlene Edwards in Paris, which presents Stafford (as Darlene) singing off-key in a high-pitch voice and her husband Paul Weston (as Jonathan) accompanying her on an out-of-tune piano.

As a publicity stunt, Weston and Stafford claimed that Jonathan and Darlene Edwards were a New Jersey lounge act they had discovered, and denied any personal connection. This ruse led to much speculation about the Edwardses' identities. In an article titled "Two Right Hands" in September 1957, Time reported that some people believed the performers were Harry and Margaret Truman, but the same piece identified Weston and Stafford as the Edwardses. In 1958, Stafford and Weston appeared as the Edwardses on Jack Benny's television program Shower of Stars, and in 1960 on The Garry Moore Show. The Piano Artistry of Jonathan Edwards was followed up with an album of popular music standards, Jonathan and Darlene Edwards in Paris, which was released in 1960 and won that year's Grammy Award for Best Comedy Album. The Academy issued two awards for the category that year; Bob Newhart also received an award for "Spoken Word Comedy" for his album The Button-Down Mind Strikes Back! The Grammy was Stafford's only major award.

The couple continued to release comedy albums for several years, and in 1977 released a cover of the Bee Gees' "Stayin' Alive" as a single, with an Edwards interpretation of Helen Reddy's "I Am Woman" as its "B" side. The same year, a brief resurgence in the popularity of Jonathan and Darlene albums occurred when their cover of "Carioca" was featured as the opening and closing theme to The Kentucky Fried Movie. Their last release, Darlene Remembers Duke, Jonathan Plays Fats, was issued in 1982. To mark the occasion, an interview with Stafford and Weston—in which they assumed the persona of the Edwardses—appeared in the December 1982 edition of Los Angeles Magazine.

== Retirement and later life ==
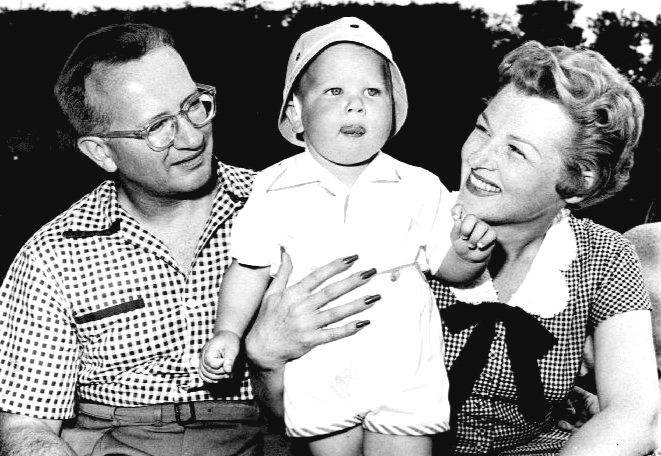
Stafford, Weston, and their son Tim in 1954

In 1959, Stafford was offered a contract to perform in Las Vegas, but declined it to concentrate on her family life. Because she disliked continuously traveling for television appearances that took her away from her children, and no longer found the music business fun, she went into semiretirement in the mid-1960s. She retired fully in 1975. Except for the Jonathan and Darlene Edwards material, and re-recording her favorite song "Whispering Hope" with her daughter Amy in 1978, Stafford did not perform again until 1990, at a ceremony honoring Frank Sinatra. The Westons devoted more time to Share Inc., a charity aiding people with developmental disabilities in which they had been active for many years. Around 1983, Concord Records tried to persuade Stafford to change her mind and come out of retirement, but although an album was planned, she did not feel she would be satisfied with the finished product, and the project was shelved. (Note: In Larry Kart's Chicago Tribune article of May 1, 1988, Weston recalls, "We almost made an album about five years ago for Concord Jazz, just after Rosie (Rosemary Clooney) began recording for them.")

Stafford won a breach-of-contract lawsuit against her former record label Columbia in the early 1990s. Because of a clause concerning the payment of royalties in her contract, she secured the rights to all of the recordings she made with the company, including those Weston and she made as Jonathan and Darlene Edwards. After the lawsuit was settled, Stafford and her son Tim reactivated Corinthian Records, which Weston, a devout Christian, had started as a label for religious music in the 1970s, and they began releasing some of her old material.

In 1996, Paul Weston died of natural causes; Stafford continued to operate Corinthian Records. In 2006, she donated the couple's library, including music arrangements, photographs, business correspondence and recordings, to the University of Arizona. Stafford began suffering from congestive heart failure in October 2007, from which she died aged 90 on July 16, 2008. She was buried with her husband at the Holy Cross Cemetery in Culver City, California.

== Style, awards, and recognition ==
Stafford was admired by critics and the listening public for the purity of her voice and was considered one of the most versatile vocalists of her era. (Note: Stafford had a reputation for perfect pitch, but she dismissed this, saying she had been a careful singer with good relative pitch.) Peter Levinson said that she was a coloratura soprano, whose operatic training allowed her to sing a natural falsetto. Her style encompassed a number of genres, including big band, ballads, jazz, folk and comedy. Music critic Terry Teachout described her as "rhythmically fluid without ever sounding self-consciously 'jazzy' ", while Rosemary Clooney said of her, "The voice says it all: beautiful, pure, straightforward, no artifice, matchless intonation, instantly recognizable. Those things describe the woman, too." Writing for the New York Sun, Will Friedwald described her 1947 interpretation of "Haunted Heart" as "effective because it's so subtle, because Stafford holds something back and doesn't shove her emotion in the listener's face." Nancy Franklin described Stafford's version of the folk song "He's Gone Away" as "wistful and tender, as if she had picked up a piece of clothing once worn by a loved one and begun singing." Remembering when he and Stafford were both singers in the Tommy Dorsey band in the early 40s, Frank Sinatra said, "It was a joy to sit on the bandstand and listen to her". The singer Judy Collins has cited Stafford's folk recordings as an influence on her own musical career. Country singer Patsy Cline was also inspired by Stafford's work.

In their guise of Jonathan and Darlene Edwards, Weston and Stafford earned admiration from their show-business peers. Pianist George Shearing was a fan and would play "Autumn in New York" in the style of Edwards if he knew the couple were in the audience. Ray Charles also enjoyed their performance. Art Carney, who played Ed Norton in the comedy series The Honeymooners, once wrote the Edwardses a fan letter as Norton. However, not everybody appreciated the Edwards act. Mitch Miller blamed the couple's 1962 album Sing Along With Jonathan and Darlene Edwards for ending his sing-along albums and television show, while in 2003, Stafford told Michael Feinstein that the Bee Gees had disliked the Edwards' version of "Stayin' Alive".

In 1960, Stafford said working closely with Weston had good and bad points. His knowledge of her made arranging her music easy for him, but sometimes it caused difficulties. Weston knew Stafford's abilities and would write or arrange elaborate music because he knew she was capable of performing it. She also said she did not believe she could perform in Broadway musicals because she thought her voice was not powerful enough for stage work. In 2003, she recalled that rehearsal time was often limited before she recorded a song, and how Weston would sometimes slip musical arrangements under the bathroom door as she was in the bath getting ready to go to the studio.

Her work in radio, television, and music is recognized by three stars on the Hollywood Walk of Fame. In 1952, listeners of Radio Luxembourg voted Stafford their favorite female singer. The New York Fashion Academy named her one of the Best Dressed Women of 1955. Songbirds magazine has reported that, by 1955, Stafford had amassed more worldwide record sales than any other female artist, and that she was ranked fifth overall. She was nominated in the Best Female Singer category at the 1955 Emmy Awards. She won a Grammy for Jonathan and Darlene Edwards in Paris, and The Pied Pipers' recording of "I'll Never Smile Again" was inducted into the Grammy Hall of Fame in 1982, as was Stafford's version of "You Belong to Me" in 1998. She was inducted into the Big Band Academy of America's Golden Bandstand in April 2007. Stafford and Weston were founding members of the National Academy of Recording Arts and Sciences.

Stafford's music has been referenced in popular culture. Her recording of "Blues in the Night" features in a scene of James Michener's novel The Drifters (1971), while a Marine Corps sergeant major in Walter Murphy's The Vicar of Christ (1979) hears a radio broadcast of her singing "On Top of Old Smoky" shortly before a battle in Korea. Commenting on the latter reference for his 1989 book Singers and the Song, which includes a chapter about Stafford, author Gene Lees says, "[it] somehow sets Stafford's place in the American culture. You're getting pretty famous when your name turns up in crossword puzzles; you are woven into a nation's history when you turn up in its fiction."

== Discography ==
Studio albums

- American Folk Songs (1948)
- Kiss Me, Kate (with Gordon MacRae) (1949)
- Autumn in New York (1950)
- Songs of Faith (1950)
- Songs for Sunday Evening (with Gordon MacRae) (1950)
- As You Desire Me (1953)
- Broadway's Best (1953)
- Starring Jo Stafford (1953)
- A Musical Portrait of New Orleans (with Frankie Laine) (1954)
- Garden of Prayer (1954)
- My Heart's in the Highlands (1954)
- Happy Holiday (1955)
- Soft and Sentimental (1955)
- Songs of Scotland (1955)
- A Gal Named Jo (1956)
- Ski Trails (1956)
- Once Over Lightly (1957)
- Swingin' Down Broadway (1958)
- Ballad of the Blues (1959)
- I'll Be Seeing You (1959)
- Jo + Jazz (1960)
- All Alone (1963)
- Getting Sentimental over Tommy Dorsey (1963)
- This Is Jo Stafford (1965)
- Do I Hear a Waltz? (1965)

== Film and television ==
Stafford appeared in films from the 1930s onwards, including Alexander's Ragtime Band. Her final on-screen appearance was in the Frank Sinatra tribute Sinatra 75: The Best Is Yet to Come in 1990. She declined several offers of television work because she was forced to memorize scripts (as she was unable to read the cue cards without her glasses), and the bright studio lights caused her discomfort.

== Publications ==
- Stafford, Jo (1951). Easy Lessons in Singing with Hints for Vocalists. Carl Fischer.
- Weston, Paul; Stafford, Jo; Pawlak, Keith (2012). Song of the Open Road: an Autobiography and Other Writings. BearManor Media. ISBN 978-1-59393-287-9.

== Bibliography ==
- Cox, Jim (2012). Musicmakers of Network Radio: 24 Entertainers, 1926–1962. McFarland. ISBN 978-0-7864-6325-1.
- Granata, Charles L. (2003). Sessions with Sinatra: Frank Sinatra and the Art of Recording. Chicago Review Press. ISBN 978-1-61374-281-5.
- Levinson, Peter (2005). Tommy Dorsey: Livin' in a Great Big Way. Da Capo Press Inc. ISBN 978-0-306-81111-1.
- Weston, Paul; Stafford, Jo; Pawlak, Keith (2012). Song of the Open Road: an Autobiography and Other Writings. BearManor Media. ISBN 978-1-59393-287-9.
