= 1897 in music =

Events in the year 1897 in music.

== Specific locations ==
- 1897 in Norwegian music

== Events ==
- January 13 – At a memorial concert in Paris for composer Emmanuel Chabrier (died 1894), the first act of his uncompleted work, Briséïs, is performed for the first time.
- March 27 – The première of Sergei Rachmaninoff's First Symphony is a complete disaster, leaving many wondering whether Alexander Glazunov, the conductor for the event, was drunk or just disliked the music so much that he did not care about a good performance. It would be three years before Rachmaninoff would compose a major piece of music again.
- September 8 – October 8 – Gustav Mahler becomes director of the Vienna Court Opera, and is obliged to convert from Judaism to Roman Catholicism.
- The Cakewalk matures into Ragtime music.
- John Philip Sousa's band makes phonograph recordings of Cakewalks and early Ragtime.
- Early publications by Scott Joplin.
- André Messager becomes musical director of the Opéra-Comique.
- Ralph Vaughan Williams studies with Max Bruch in Berlin.
- Teatro Nuovo in Bergamo changes its name to Teatro Donizetti.
- The pan-African anthem "Nkosi Sikelel' iAfrika" ("God Bless Africa") is composed as a Xhosa hymn by South African teacher Enoch Sontonga; versions become the national anthem of 5 countries including Tanzania's "Mungu ibariki Afrika".
- Composer Alexander Scriabin marries pianist Vera Ivanovna.

== Publications ==
- Ben Harney – Ben Harney's Rag Time Instructor

== Published popular music ==
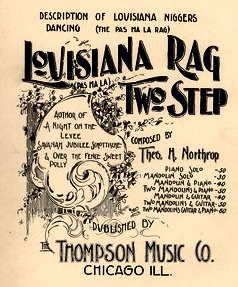
- "Asleep In The Deep" w. Arthur J. Lamb m. Henry W. Petrie
- "At A Georgia Camp Meeting" w.m. Kerry Mills
- "Badinage" m. Victor Herbert
- "Beautiful Isle of Somewhere" w. Mrs Jessie Brown Pounds m. John S. Fearis
- "Danny Deever" w. Rudyard Kipling m. Walter Damrosch
- "Harlem Rag" m. Tom Turpin
- "Let 'em All Come" w.m. T. W. Connor
- "Louisiana Rag" m. Theodore H. Northrup
- "On The Banks Of The Wabash Far Away" w.m. Paul Dresser
- "Our Lodger's Such A Nice Young Man" w.m. Fred Murray & Laurence Barclay
- "Roustabout Rag" m. Paul Sarebresole
- "Song Of India" m. Nikolai Rimsky-Korsakov
- "The Stars and Stripes Forever" m. John Philip Sousa (Recorded on Berliner Records)
- "Syncopated Sandy" by Ned Wayburn & Stanley Whiting
- "Take Back Your Gold" w.m. Monroe H. Rosenfeld
- "There's A Little Star Shining For You" w.m. James Thornton
- "Ye Boston Tea Party" by Arthur Pryor

== Recorded popular music ==
- "A Hot Time in the Old Town"
  – Len Spencer & Vess Ossman
- "American Medley"
  – W. Paris Chambers on Berliner
- "Blue Bells of Scotland"
  – Arthur Pryor (of Sousa's Band) for Berliner
- "A Bunch of Roses"
  – W. Paris Chambers on Berliner
- "Change Will Do You Good"
  – William F. Denny on Berliner
- "Cillerthal"
  – Graus Mountain Choir on Berliner
- "Cornfield Medley"
  – The Edison Quartet on Edison
- "The Czar of the Tenderloin"
  – William F. Denny on Berliner
- "Dance California"
  – Cullen and Collins on Berliner
- "Die Nachtingall - The Nightingale"
  – Vroni Eidner on Berliner
- "The Directorate March"
  – Sousa's Band on Berliner
  – Vess Ossman on Berliner
- "Du Du"
  – Charles P. Lowe on Berliner
- "El Captain March"
  – Edison Concert Band on Edison Records
- "Fly Song"
  – George J. Gaskin
- "Gayest Manhattan"
  – Vess Ossman on Berliner
- "Happy Days in Dixie"
  – Sousa's Band on Berliner
- "Hiram's Visit to New York"
  – Russell Hunting on Berliner
- "Hot Time Medley"
  – Cullen and Collins on Berliner
- "Ikey Eisenstein"
  – Dan W. Quinn on Berliner
- "In Old Madrid"
  – W. Paris Chambers on Berliner
  – Vess Ossman on Berliner
- "International Medley"
  – W. Paris Chambers on Berliner
- "In The Gloaming" (w. Meta Orred m. Annie Fortescue Harrison)
  – Roger Harding on Berliner Gramophone
- "Jolly Darkies"
  – Vess Ossman on Berliner
  – Stephen B. Clements on Berliner
- "King Cotton March"
  – Cullen and Collins on Berliner
- "Last Night"
  – W. Paris Chambers on Berliner
- "Laughing"
  – George Graham (monologist) & Billy Golden on Berliner
- "L.A.W. March"
  – Vess Ossman on Berliner
- "The Laughing Auctioneer"
  – W.O. Beckenbaugh on Berliner
- "Les Alsachiennes - Bolero"
  – August P. Stengler on Berliner
- "Liberty Bell March"
  – Edison Concert Band on Edison Records
- "Lilly Bells"
  – Sousa's Band on Berliner
- "Little Darling Dream of Me"
  – The Diamond Four on Columbia
- "Little Kinkies" (w.m. M. Tobias)
  – Edison Concert Band on Edison Records brown wax cylinder No. 155
- "Little Marcia Marie"
  – Sousa's Band on Berliner
- "Little Nell"
  – Noble McDonald on Berliner
  – Arthur Pryor (of Sousa's Band) for Berliner
- "Loin du Bal"
  – Sousa's Band on Berliner
- "Lovely Little Maiden Schottische"
  – Edison Symphony Orchestra on Edison
- "Ma Angeline"
  – Cullen and Collins on Berliner
- "Maggie, My Own"
  – George J. Gaskin
- "Massa's In De Cold Cold Ground"
  – The Diamond Four for Berliner
- "Michael Casey as Chairman of Mugwump Club"
  – Russell Hunting on Berliner
- "Michael Casey at the Living Pictures"
  – Russell Hunting on Berliner
- "Michael Casey Putting His Baby to Sleep"
  – Russell Hunting on Berliner
- "Miserere - Il Trovatore"
  – Henry Higgins & Arthur Pryor (of Sousa's Band) for Berliner
- "Morning on the Farm"
  – N.R. Wood on Berliner
- "Morning Serenade"
  – Fadettes of Boston on Berliner
- "The Mountain Climber"
  – Graus Duo on Berliner
- "My Mother Was a Lady"
  – Dan W. Quinn
- "Narcissus"
  – Felix Jardella on Berliner
  – Vess Ossman on Berliner
- "Negro Oddity"
  – George Graham (monologist) & Billy Golden on Berliner
- "Oh, Paradise!"
  – Fadettes of Boston on Berliner
- "Oh! Uncle John"
  – Russell Hunting on Berliner
- "On The Banks of The Wabash"
  – George J. Gaskin
- "Old Hickory"
  – United States Marine Band on Columbia
- "Orange Blossoms"
  – Sousa's Band on Berliner
- "The Palms"
  – W. Paris Chambers on Berliner
- "Patrol Comique"
  – Felix Jardella on Berliner
- "Quando Le Sere Al Placido"
  – Ferruccio Giannini on Berliner
- "Rastus on Parade"
  – Cullen and Collins on Berliner
- "Sally in Our Alley" (w. Henry Carey m. trad)
  – Edison Quartette on Edison
- "Scenes That Are Brightest"
  – W. Paris Chambers on Berliner
- "A Talk By Happy Cal Stewart - The Yankee Comedian"
  – Cal Stewart on Berliner
- "The Seraph"
  – W. Paris Chambers on Berliner
- "The Signal Polka"
  – Arthur Pryor (of Sousa's Band) for Berliner
- "Sleigh Ride Party"
  – Len Spencer & Friends for Columbia
- "Starlight Waltz"
  – Sousa's Band on Berliner
- "Stars & Stripes Forever"
  – John Philip Sousa
  – Edison Concert Band on Edison Records
- "Sweet Lorena Ray"
  – Arthur Pryor (of Sousa's Band) for Berliner
- "Sweet & Low"
  – Fadettes of Boston on Berliner
- "Sweet Rosey O'Grady"
  – Steve Porter (singer) on Berliner
- "There'll Come a Time"
  – Arthur Pryor (of Sousa's Band) for Berliner
- "There's a Little Star Shining for You"
  – Dan W. Quinn on Edison Records
- "Thunderer March"
  – Sousa's Band on Berliner
- "Trip Around Town"
  – Edison Concert Band on Edison Records
- "The Two Grenadiers"
  – Arthur Pryor (of Sousa's Band) for Berliner
- "Virginia Camp Meeting"
  – George Graham (monologist) & Billy Golden on Berliner
- "Von Meinen Bergen"
  – Mirzl Meister on Berliner
- "Way Down Yonder In The Cornfield"
  – The Diamond Four for Berliner
- "William Tell Overture"
  – Sousa's Band on Berliner
- "Yankee Doodle"
  – W. Paris Chambers on Berliner
- "You're Not the Only Pebble on the Beach"
  – Dan W. Quinn on Berliner
- "Zulu Jingles"
  – Cullen and Collins on Berliner

== Classical music ==
- Hugo Alfvén – Symphony No. 1
- Ferruccio Busoni – Violin Concerto
- Ernest Chausson
  - Chant funèbre, for four female voices (1897)
  - Piano Quartet in A, Op. 30
  - Vêpres pour le commun des vierges, for organ, Op. 31
  - String Quartet, Op. 35
  - Piece for cello or viola, and piano, Op. 39
- Frederick Delius – Piano Concerto
- Felix Draeseke – String Quintet in A "Stelzner"-Quintet
- Paul Dukas – The Sorcerer's Apprentice
- George Enescu –
  - Piano Suite No. 1 in G minor, "Dans le style ancien" Op. 3
  - Poème roumain, Op. 1
  - Sonata no. 1 for violin and piano in D major, Op. 2
  - Trio in G minor for piano, violin, and cello
- August Enna – Concerto for violin and orchestra in D major
- Asger Hamerik – Symphony no. 6 ("Spirituelle") for string orchestra
- Alexander Mackenzie – Piano Concerto
- Carl Nielsen – Hymnus amoris
- Dora Pejačević – Berceuse, Op. 2, for solo piano
- Nikolai Rimsky-Korsakov – Symphony No. 2 "Antar" (final version)
- Arnold Schoenberg – String Quartet in D major
- Alexander Scriabin – Piano Sonata No. 2
- Richard Strauss – Till Eulenspiegels lustige Streiche
- Alexander von Zemlinsky – Symphony No. 2
- Charles Ives – Overture in G minor (left unfinished).

== Opera ==
- Frederick Delius – Koanga
- August Enna – The Little Match Girl
- Zdeněk Fibich – Šárka
- Ivar Hallstrom – Little Karin
- Eduard Holst – Our Flats, premiered in New York
- Wilhelm Kienzl – Don Quixote
- Luigi Mancinelli – Ero e Leandro
- Jules Massenet – Sapho
- Johann Strauss II – Die Göttin der Vernunft
- Alexander Zemlinsky – Sarema

== Musical theater ==
- The Belle of New York Broadway production
- The Charlatan Broadway production
- The Circus Girl Broadway production
- The Glad Hand Broadway production
- Miss Manhattan Broadway production
- Pousse Café Broadway production
- The Yashmak – Adaptation of an Armenian operetta, Leblébidji Horhor, with music by Napoleon Lambelet and libretto by Cecil Raleigh and Seymour Hicks, runs from 31 March 1897 to 31 July 1897 (121 performances) at the Shaftesbury Theatre, London.

== Births ==
- January 2 – Jane Green, US singer (died 1931)
- January 9 – Luis Gianneo, Argentine composer, pianist, and conductor (died 1968)
- January 10 – Sam Chatmon, blues musician (died 1983)
- January 22
  - Rosa Ponselle, soprano (died 1981)
  - Leslie Sarony, English singer, comedian and songwriter (died 1985)
- February 12 – Břetislav Bakala, conductor and pianist (died 1958)
- February 27 – Marian Anderson, contralto (died 1993)
- March 3 – Ingrid Lang-Fagerström, harpist (died 1990)
- March 6 – Sandy MacPherson, theatre organist (died 1975)
- March 9 – Pedro Flores, composer (died 1979)
- March 11 – Henry Cowell, composer (died 1965)
- March 13 – Maria Nemeth, Hungarian operatic soprano (died 1967)
- March 21 – Sim Gokkes, Dutch-Jewish composer (died 1943)
- March 26 – David McCallum, Sr., violinist and father of David McCallum (died 1972)
- April 1 – Lucille Bogan, blues singer (died 1979)
- April 8 – John Frederick Coots, US composer (died 1985)
- April 17 – Harald Sæverud, composer (died 1992)
- April 19 – Vivienne Segal, US actress and singer (died 1992)
- April 23 – Pixinguinha, choro composer and woodwind player (died 1973)
- May 14 – Sidney Bechet, jazz saxophonist, clarinetist, and composer (died 1959)
- May 29 – Erich Wolfgang Korngold, composer (died 1957)
- June 3
  - Memphis Minnie, blues singer (died 1973)
  - Boris Kroyt, classical violinist and violist, member of the Budapest String Quartet from 1936 to 1967 (died 1969)
- June 12 – Alexandre Tansman, pianist and composer (died 1986)
- June 15 – Mary Ellis, actress and singer (died 2003)
- June 22 – Bulbul, opera and folk singer (died 1961)
- June 27 – Maceo Pinkard, composer, lyricist and music publisher (died 1962)
- August 10 — Jack Haley, American actor (d. 1979)
- August 4 – Abe Lyman, US bandleader, composer and drummer (died 1957)
- August 29 – Helge Rosvaenge, operatic tenor (died 1972)
- September 3 – Francisco Mignone, composer (died 1986)
- September 8 – Jimmie Rodgers, country singer (died 1933)
- September 18
  - Pablo Sorozábal, composer (died 1988)
  - Sam H. Stept, Russian-born US composer, pianist and conductor (died 1964)
- October 11 – Leo Reisman, violinist and bandleader (died 1961)
- October 26 – Tiana Lemnitz, operatic soprano (died 1994)
- November 2 – Dennis King, British singer and actor (died 1971)
- November 12 – Karl Marx, conductor and composer (died 1985)
- November 20 – Margaret Sutherland, composer (died 1984)
- December 9 – Hermione Gingold, actress and singer (died 1987)
- December 18 – Fletcher Henderson, jazz musician (died 1952)
- December 26 — Wilhelmina Schmidt, singer and composer; stage name Willy Corsari (died 1998)
- December 30 – Alfredo Bracchi, Italian lyricist (died 1976)

== Deaths ==
- January 24 – Sarah Edith Wynne, operatic soprano and concert singer, 54
- February 10 – Antonio Bazzini, violinist, composer and music, 78
- February 23 – Woldemar Bargiel, composer and teacher, 68
- February 25 – Cornélie Falcon, opera singer, 83
- March 7 – Leonard Labatt, operatic tenor, 58
- April 3 – Johannes Brahms, composer, 63
- April 8 – George Garrett, composer, 62
- April 23 – Clement Harris, pianist and composer, 25 (killed in the Greco-Turkish war)
- May 21 – Carl Mikuli, pianist and composer, 77
- June 9
  - Ignace Gibsone, pianist and composer, 70
  - Pavel Pabst, pianist and composer, 43
- June 18 – Franz Krenn, composer and music teacher, 81
- August 1 – Gaetano Antoniazzi, violin-maker, 71
- September 16 – Edward Edwards, choirmaster and composer, 81
- September 20
  - Karel Bendl, composer, 59
  - Grenville Dean Wilson, pianist and composer, 64
- October 11 – Léon Boëllmann, organist and composer, 35
- November 6 – Edouard Deldevez, conductor, composer and violinist, 80
- November 14 – Giuseppina Strepponi, operatic soprano, 82
- December – Slavka Atanasijević, Serbian pianist and composer, 47
- December 4 – Adolf Neuendorff, German-American composer, conductor, pianist and violinist, 54
