= 1826 in music =

This article is about music-related events in 1826.

== Events ==
- Chopin begins to study with Józef Elsner at the Warsaw Conservatory.

== Published popular music ==
- "The Old Oaken Bucket" w. Samuel Woodworth m. George F. Kiallmark. Words written in 1817.

== Classical music ==
- Ludwig van Beethoven
  - String Quartet No. 14 in C-sharp minor, Op. 131
  - String Quartet No. 16 in F major, Op. 135
- Muzio Clementi – Complete Gradus ad Parnassum (100 pieces) appears for the first time, simultaneously in Paris, Leipzig and London on October 31.
- Johannes Frederik Frøhlich – Concertino for violin and orchestra in D major
- Franz Liszt – Initial version of the Étude en douze exercices
- Felix Mendelssohn – Overture "A Midsummer Night's Dream" in E major for orchestra, Op. 21
- Giovanni Morandi – Raccolta di Suonate pei grand' Organi Moderni, Op. 21
- Niccolò Paganini – Violin Concerto No. 2
- Ferdinand Ries
  - Piano Concerto No.8, Op.151
  - Variationen über eine portugiesische Hymne für Pianoforte und Flöte in A major, Op. 152
  - 3 Flute Quartets, WoO 35, No. 1 in D minor
- Franz Schubert
  - Symphony No. 9 in C major "Great"
  - String Quartet No. 15 in G major
  - Piano Sonata No. 18 in G major "Fantasie"

== Opera ==
- John Barnett – Before Breakfast
- Vincenzo Bellini – Bianca e Fernando
- Gaetano Donizetti – Alahor in Granata
- Joseph Augustine Wade – The Two Houses of Granada
- Carl Maria von Weber – Oberon, King of the Fairies (first performed in London, libretto by James Planché)

== Births ==
- January 18 – Joseph-Henri Altès, composer (d. 1895)
- February 1 – Marie Carandini, operatic soprano (d. 1894)
- February 2 – Louisa Langhans-Japha, composer (d. 1910)
- February 16 – Franz von Holstein, composer
- March 6 – Marietta Alboni, operatic contralto (d. 1894)
- March 14 – W. F. Sherwin, composer (d. 1888)
- March 23 – Léon Minkus, composer (d. 1917)
- April 7 – Johann Hermann Berens, composer (d. 1880)
- April 28 – Alexander Stadtfeld, composer (d. 1853)
- June 1
  - Carl Bechstein, piano-maker (d. 1900)
  - Hermann Zopff, composer (d. 1883)
- July 4 – Stephen Foster, songwriter (d. 1864)
- July 8 – Friedrich Chrysander, music historian (d. 1901)
- July 22 – Julius Stockhausen, singer and music teacher (d. 1906)
- August 13 – William Thomas Best, organist (d. 1897)
- August 24 – Edward Mack, songwriter (d. 1882)
- August 28 – Walter Cecil Macfarren, pianist and composer (d. 1905)
- September 12 - Richard Pohl, music critic (d. 1896)
- October 13 – Johanna Jachmann-Wagner, operatic mezzo-soprano (d. 1894)
- October 14 – Georges Mathias, composer and pianist (d. 1910)
- October 16
  - Mathilda Ebeling, Swedish soprano (d. 1851)
  - Piotr Studzinski, composer (d. 1869)
- October 22 – Guglielmo Quarenghi, cellist and composer (d. 1882)
- December 21 – Ernst Pauer, composer (d. 1905)
- December 24 – Ignacy Krzyżanowski, Polish composer (d. 1905)

== Deaths ==
- January 17 – Juan Crisóstomo Arriaga, composer (b. 1806)
- February 11 – Charles Incledon, singer (b. 1763)
- March 14 – Julie Alix de la Fay, ballerina (b. 1748)
- March 29 – Johann Heinrich Voss, lyricist (b. 1751)
- April 3 – Reginald Heber, hymn-writing bishop (b. 1783)
- April 13 – Franz Danzi, cellist, conductor and composer (b. 1763)
- May 6 – Sophie Hagman, ballerina (b. 1758)
- May 24 – Frederic Ernest Fesca, violinist and composer (b. 1789)
- May 27 – Carl David Stegmann, singer, harpsichordist, conductor and composer (b. 1751)
- June 5 – Carl Maria von Weber, composer (b. 1786)
- July 7 – Friedrich Ludwig Dulon, flautist and composer (b. 1768)
- July 11 – Karl Bernhard Wessely, composer (b. 1768)
- August 30 – Theodor Zwettler, composer (b. 1758)
- September 28 – Dietrich Nikolaus Winkel, inventor of the first working metronome (b. 1780)
- October 9 – Michael Kelly, actor, singer and composer (b. 1762)
- November 17 – Caroline Frederikke Müller, operatic mezzo-soprano (b. 1755)
- December 3 – Elizabeth Sandunova, soprano
- December 10 – Benedikt Emanuel Schack, singer and composer (b. 1758)
