= 1905 in music =

This is a list of notable events in music that took place in the year 1905.

== Specific locations ==
- 1905 in Norwegian music

== Events ==
- January 6 – Première of Leoš Janáček's piano cycle On an Overgrown Path (Po zarostlém chodníčku) at the "Besední dům" Hall in Brno.
- January 8 - Florent Schmitt's symphonic poem Le Palais hante [The Haunted Palace], based on a story by Edgar Allan Poe, is premièred at the Orchestre Lamoureux in Paris.
- January 26 – Arnold Schoenberg's symphonic poem Pelleas und Melisande is premièred in Vienna.
- January 29 – Gustav Mahler's Kindertotenlieder is premiered in Vienna.
- February 2 - The Moscov paper Nashi Dni publishes an open letter signed by 29 prominent Moscov musicians, including Rachmaninoff, Chaliapin, Gliere, calling for basic reforms in Russia.
- February 5 - Camille Saint-Saëns's Concerto No.2 in D Minor for Cello and Orchestra premieres in Paris
- February 10 - German conductor Felix Weingartner conducts for the first time in America with the New York Philharmonic Orchestra.
- February 14 - Jules Massenet's opera Cherubin premiers in Monte Carlo.
- February 25 - Concerto for Dubble Bass and Orchestra by Serge Koussevitzky is premièred in Moscow, with the composer as soloist.
- February 27 - The ballet My Lady Nicotine, with music by George W. Byng, is produced at the Alhambra Theatre, London.
- March 4 - Concerto in A minor for Violin and Orchestra, Op.82, by Alexander Glazunov, receives its world première in Saint Petersburg, the composer conducting.
- March 8 - Edward Elgar's Introduction and Allegro for string quartet and string orchestra and Pomp and Circumstance No.3 are premièred as the composer conducts the London Symphony Orchestra
- March 12 - Ottorino Respighi's first opera Re Enzo receives its initial performance in Bologna.
- March 16 - Pietro Mascagni's lyric drama Amica is premièred at the Theatre du Casino, Monte Carlo.
- March 19 - Nikolai Rimsky-Korsakov is dismissed from the faculty of the Saint Petersburg Conservatory for supporting students who went on strike demanding reforms.
- March 27 - A performance of Nikolai Rimsky-Korsakov's Kashchey the Deathless becomes the scene of heated public demonstration as a result of recent events at the Saint Petersburg Conservatory.
- April 14 - Engelbert Humperdinck's three-act comic opera Die Heirat wider Willen receives its initial performance at the Royal Opera in Berlin.
- April 15 - The Consertvatory of Geneva gives the first public demonstration os Émile Jaques-Dalcroze's eurythmics.
- April 30 - Louis Coerne is awarded a Ph.D.for his dissertation The Evolution of Modern Orchestration.
- May 25 - Emile Jaques-Dalcroze's opera Onkel Dazumal is produced in Cologne
- May 29 - Alexander Scriabin's Symphony No.3 in C Major, The Divine Poem, Op.43, is performed for the first time by Arthur Nikisch in Paris.
- June 26 - Gabriel Faure succeeds Theodore Dubois as director of the Paris Conservatoire
- September – The lyrics of Rabindranath Tagore's song "Amar Shonar Bangla" are published in two magazines. They are later adopted as the national anthem of Bangladesh.
- September 8 - Double-bass virtuoso Serge Koussevitzky maries Natalie Ushkov, the daughter of a wealthy tea merchant
- September 29 - George Whitefield Chadwick's symphonic poem Cleopatra premieres at the Worcester Music Festival in Massachusetts
- October – The opera house at Nancy, France, is destroyed by fire.
- October 4 - Enrico Caruso, now in Vienna, denies claims of music critics in Budapest that he "had to have morphine injected" when he sang in Budapest
- October 8 - Max Reger's Sinfonietta in A Major, Op.90 is premiered by Felix Mottl in Essen
- October 11 – The Institute of Musical Art, predecessor of the Juilliard School, opens in New York City.
- October 15 – Claude Debussy's La Mer is premiered in Paris as Camille Chevillard conducts the Lamoureux Orchestra.
- October 19 - A revised final version of Jean Sibelius' Violin concerto in D Minor, Op.47, premieres in Berlin with Carl Halir as soloist.
- October 21
  - Henry Wood first conducts a performance of his Fantasia on British Sea Songs at a Trafalgar Day concert in London.
  - Turandot Suite, by Ferruccio Busoni, receives its first performance in Berlin.
- October 29 - The first concert of the New Symphony Orchestra of London occurs at the Coronet Theater, London
- Otto Klemperer meets Mahler for the first time, while conducting one of his works.
- December 1 - The first opera by an American composer ever to be staged in Europe is produced in Bremen. It is the three-act opera Zenobia, by Louis Adolphe Coerne.
- December 5 - Alexander Glazunov is elected director of the Saint Petersburg Conservatory
- December 9 - Richard Strauss's one-act musical drama Salome receives its initial performance at the Königliches Opernhaus in Dresden.
- December 26 - Charles-Marie Widor's four-act opera Les Pecheurs de Saint-Jean receives its first performance at the Opera-Comique in Paris.
- December 28 - Die lustige Witwe by Franz Lehar, receives its first performance in Vienna.

== Published popular music ==
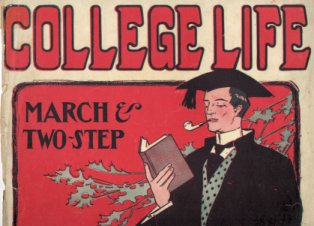
- "Amoureuse Waltz" Berger
- "Bandana Land" by Glen MacDonough
- "Birth of the Flowers" m. Charles E. Roat
- "Bunker Hill" w. Sam Erlich m. Albert Von Tilzer
- "College Life" m. Hery Frantzen
- "Come Clean" by Paul Sarebresole
- "Daddy's Little Girl" w. Edward Madden m. Theodore F. Morse
- "Dearie" w.m. Clare Kummer
- "Down Where The Silv'ry Mohawk Flows" w. Monroe Rosenfeld m. John A. Heinzman & Otto Milton Heinzman (1873–1943)
- "Everybody Works But Father" w.m. Jean Havez
- "Farewell, Mister Abner Hemingway" w. William Jerome m. Jean Schwartz
- "Forty-Five Minutes From Broadway" w.m. George M. Cohan from the musical of the same name.
- "The Girl Who Cares For Me" w. Will D. Cobb m. Gus Edwards
- "Goodbye, Maggie Doyle" Jean Schwartz
- "Good-bye, Sweet Old Manhattan Isle" w. William Jerome m. Jean Schwartz
- "Goodbye, Sweetheart, Goodbye" w. Arthur J. Lamb m. Harry von Tilzer
- "Happy Heine" m. J. Bodewalt Lampe
- "He's Me Pal" w. Vincent P. Bryan m. Gus Edwards
- "How'd You Like To Spoon With Me?" w. Edward Laska m. Jerome Kern
- "I Don't Care" w. Jean Lenox m. Harry O. Sutton
- "I Love A Lassie" w. Harry Lauder & George Grafton m. Harry Lauder
- "I Want What I Want When I Want It" w. Henry Blossom m. Victor Herbert
- "If A Girl Like You Loved A Boy Like Me" w.m. Will D. Cobb m. Gus Edwards
- "I'm The Only Star That Twinkles On Broadway" w. Andrew B. Sterling m. Harry von Tilzer
- "In Dear Old Georgia" w. Harry Williams m. Egbert Van Alstyne
- "In My Merry Oldsmobile" w. Vincent P. Bryan m. Gus Edwards
- "In the Shade of the Old Apple Tree" w. Harry H. Williams m. Egbert Van Alstyne
- "The Irish Girl I Love" w. George V. Hobart m. Max Hoffmann
- "Is Everybody Happy?" w. Frank Williams m. Ernest Hogan & Tom Lemonier
- "It Ain't All Honey And It Ain't All Jam" w.m. Fred Murray & George Everard
- "Just A Little Rocking Chair And You" w. Bert Fitzgibbon & Jack Drislane m. Theodore F. Morse
- "Kiss Me Again" w. Henry Blossom m. Victor Herbert
- "Leola" m. Scott Joplin
- "Mary's A Grand Old Name" w.m. George M. Cohan. From the musical Forty-five Minutes from Broadway.
- "The Moon Has His Eyes On You" w. Billy Johnson m. Albert Von Tilzer
- "My Gal Sal" w.m. Paul Dresser
- "My Irish Molly O" w. William Jerome m. Jean Schwartz
- "Nellie Dean" Henry W. Armstrong
- "Nobody" w. Alex Rogers m. Bert A. Williams
- "On An Automobile Honeymoon" w. William Jerome m. Jean Schwartz
- "On The Banks Of The Rhine With A Stein" w. Andrew B. Sterling m. Harry von Tilzer
- "Parade Of The Tin Soldiers" later known as "Parade Of The Wooden Soldiers" m. Leon Jessel
- "Peaches And Cream" m. Percy Wenrich
- "A Picnic For Two" w. Arthur J. Lamb m. Albert Von Tilzer
- "Put Me In My Little Cell" w P.G. Wodehouse, m Frederick Rosse
- "Ramblin' Sam" w. Harry H. Williams m. Jean Schwartz

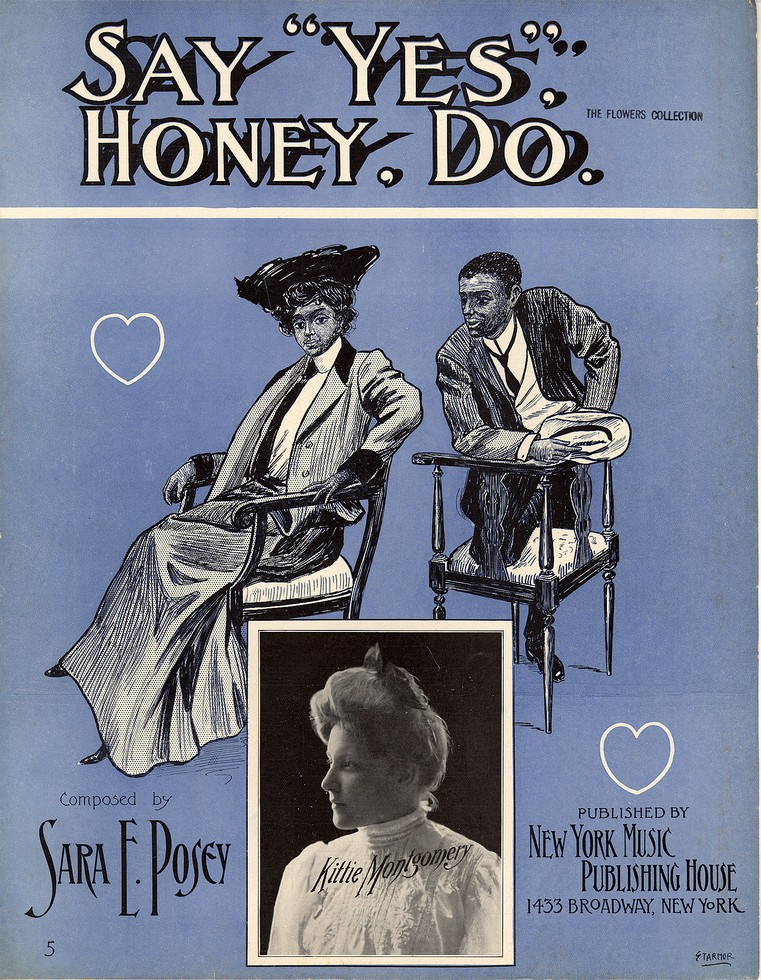

- "She Is My Daisy" w.m. Harry Lauder & J. D. Harper
- "So Long Mary" w.m. George M. Cohan
- "Tammany" w. Vincent P. Bryan m. Gus Edwards
- "To Be Loved by the Girl You Love" Irving J. Schloss
- "Wait 'Til The Sun Shines, Nellie" w. Andrew B. Sterling m. Harry Von Tilzer
- "Waiting At The Church" w. Fred W. Leigh m. Henry E. Pether
- "Waltzing With The Girl You Love" w.m. George Evans & Ren Shields
- "The Whistler And His Dog" m. Arthur Pryor
- "The Whole Damm Family" Smith, Von Tilzer
- "Why Don't You Try?" w. Harry H. Williams m. Egbert Van Alstyne
- "Will You Love Me In December" w. James J. Walker m. Ernest R. Ball
- "A Woman Is Only A Woman But A Good Cigar Is A Smoke" w. Harry B. Smith m. Victor Herbert

== Recorded popular music ==
- "I Love A Lassie" by Harry Lauder
- "Yankee Doodle Boy" by Billy Murray
- "Give My Regards To Broadway" by Billy Murray
- "In My Merry Oldsmobile" by Billy Murray

== Classical music ==
- Hugo Alfvén – Symphony No. 3 in E major
- Claude Debussy
  - La mer
  - Suite bergamasque (revised)
- Edward Elgar – Introduction and Allegro for Strings
- George Enescu – Symphony No. 1 in E-flat major, Op. 13
- Gabriel Fauré – Piano Quintet No. 1 in D minor, Op. 89
- Leoš Janáček – Piano Sonata 1.X.1905
- Reynaldo Hahn – Le Bal de Béatrice d'Este, suite for wind instruments, two harps and piano
- Serge Koussevitzky - Concerto for Double Bass and Orchestra
- Nikolai Medtner – Fairy Tales for Piano (Opp. 8, 9)
- Carl Nielsen – Søvnen (The Sleep)
- Vítězslav Novák – Quartet for Strings No. 2 in D Major
- Helena Munktell – Violin Sonata, Op.21
- Ole Olsen – Trombone Concerto
- Maurice Ravel – Introduction et Allegro, for harp, flute, clarinet and string quartet
- Emil von Reznicek
  - Nachtstück
  - Präludium und chromatische Fuge
  - Symphony No.2 in B-flat major "Ironic"
- Albert Roussel – Conte à la poupée, L.5
- Camille Saint-Saëns – Cello Sonata No. 2
- Arnold Schoenberg – String Quartet No. 1, Op. 7 in D minor.
- Jean Sibelius – Violin Concerto (Op. 47)
- Emil Sjögren
  - Poème, Op.40
  - Piano Sonata No.2, Op.44
- Anton Webern –
  - Langsamer Satz, for string quartet
  - String Quartet in one movement
- Haydn Wood – Phantasy String Quartet

== Opera ==
- Frederick Converse – The Pipe of Desire
- Leo Fall – Irrlicht
- Manuel de Falla – La Vida breve (libretto by Fernández Shaw)
- Franz Lehár
  - Die Lustige Witwe (The Merry Widow) (Libretto by Victor Léon and Leo Stein, after the play L'attaché d'ambassade (The Embassy Attaché) by Henri Meilhac)
  - Tatjana, premiered February 21 in Brünn
- Jules Massenet – Chérubin (Libretto by Henri Cain and Francis de Croisset)
- Leopoldo Mugnone – Vita Bretone
- Richard Strauss – Salome (Libretto by Hedwig Lachmann, from the play by Oscar Wilde)

== Musical theater ==
- The Babes and the Baron Broadway production opened at the Lyric Theatre on December 25 and ran for 45 performances
- The Catch of the Season Broadway production opened at Daly's Theatre on August 28 and ran for 104 performances.
- The Earl and the Girl Broadway production opened at the Casino Theatre on November 4 and ran for 148 performances.
- Fantana Broadway production opened at the Lyric Theatre on January 14 and ran for 298 performances.
- Lifting the Lid Broadway production opened at the Aerial Gardens Theatre on June 5 and ran for 72 performances
- Die lustige Witwe (The Merry Widow) Vienna production, December 28
- Miss Dolly Dollars Broadway production opened at the Knickerbocker Theatre on September 4 and moved to the New Amsterdam Theatre on October 16 for a total run of 112 performances.
- Mlle. Modiste Broadway production opened at the Knickerbocker Theatre on December 12 and ran for 202 performances
- The Rogers Brothers in Ireland Broadway production opened at the Liberty Theatre on September 4 and ran for 106 performances.
- The Rollicking Girl Broadway production opened at the Herald Square Theatre on May 1 and transferred to the New York Theatre on April 16, 1906, for a total run of 199 performances
- Sergeant Brue Broadway production opened at the Knickerbocker Theatre on April 24 and ran for 152 performances.
- The Spring Chicken London production opened at the Gaiety Theatre on May 30 and ran for 401 performances
- Tom, Dick and Harry Broadway production opened at the at the American Theatre on September 25 and played on tour at many different theaters both on Broadway (four different theaters) and off
- When We Were Forty-One Broadway production opened at the New York Roof Theatre on June 12 and ran for 66 performances
- Wonderland Broadway production opened at the Majestic Theatre on October 24 and ran for 73 performances

== Births ==
- January 2 – Michael Tippett, composer (d. 1998)
- January 5 - Ernesto Halffter, Spanish composer (d. 1989)
- January 8 – Giacinto Scelsi, composer (d. 1988)
- January 10 – Albert Arlen, Australian pianist, composer, actor, and playwright (d. 1993)
- January 12 – Tex Ritter, actor and singer (d. 1974)
- January 24 – Elena Nicolai, opera singer (d. 1993)
- January 26 – Maria von Trapp, singer (d. 1987)
- February 11 – William Henry "Chick" Webb, drummer (d. 1939)
- February 15 – Harold Arlen, popular composer (d. 1986)
- February 18 – Queenie Leonard, British character actress and singer (d. 2002)
- February 25 – Harald Lander, Danish dancer and choreographer (d. 1971)
- March 2 – Marc Blitzstein, American composer (d. 1964)
- March 6 – Bob Wills, country music singer (d. 1975)
- March 11 – Michael Carr, composer and songwriter (d. 1968)
- March 15
  - Bertha Hill, American blues, vaudeville singer and dancer (d. 1950)
  - Harold Loeffelmacher, musician and bandleader, Six Fat Dutchmen (d. 1987)
- March 18 - John Kirkpatrick, American pianist (d.1991)
- March 21 – Ivar Haglund, folksinger and restaurateur (d. 1985)
- March 22 - Ruth Page, dancer, choreographer and ballet director (d. 1991)
- March 23 – Lale Andersen, singer and cabaretist (d. 1972)
- April 2
  - Serge Lifar, Russian choreographer and dancer (d. 1976)
  - Kurt Herbert Adler, Austrian conductor (d. 1988)
- April 3 - Lili Kraus, Hungarian pianist (d. 1986)
- May 2 – Alan Rawsthorne, composer (d. 1971)
- May 4 - Mátyás Seiber, Hungarian composer (d.1960)
- May 7 – Bumble Bee Slim, American Piedmont blues singer, guitarist (d. 1968)
- May 8 – Red Nichols, US bandleader and cornettist (d. 1965)
- May 10 – Louis Kaufman, American violinist (d. 1994)
- May 11 – Kansas Joe McCoy, American Delta blues musician, songwriter (d. 1950)
- May 24 - Sascha Gorodnitzki, pianist (d. 1986)
- June 4 - José Echániz, Cuban-American pianist (d. 1969)
- June 6 - Arthur Mendel, music scholar and musicologist (d. 1979)
- June 13 – Doc Cheatham, US jazz trumpeter (d. 1997)
- June 18
  - Eduard Tubin, Estonian composer (d. 1982)
  - Leonid Lavrovsky, Soviet dancer, choreographer and ballet director (d. 1967)
- June 23 – Jesús Bal y Gay, Spanish composer, music critic and musicologist (d. 1993)
- July 7
  - Charlo, Argentine singer, musician, pianist, actor and composer (d. 1990)
  - Max Rostal, Austrian-British violinist (d. 1991)
- July 10 – Ivie Anderson, US jazz singer (d. 1949)
- July 15 – Dorothy Fields, US lyricist and librettist (d. 1974)
- August 2 – Karl Amadeus Hartmann, composer (d. 1963)
- August 8 – André Jolivet, composer (d. 1974)
- August 23 – Constant Lambert, composer (d. 1951)
- August 29 – Jack Teagarden, jazz trombonist, singer, bandleader and composer (d. 1964)
- October 4 – Léon Orthel, composer and pianist (d. 1985)
- October 18 -Fritz Feldmann, musicologist (d. 1984)
- October 23 - Alexander Melik-Pashayev, Georgian conductor (d. 1964)
- October 24 – Elizabeth Poston, English composer, pianist and writer (d. 1987)
- November 7 – William Alwyn, composer (d. 1985)
- November 12 - Arthur Hedley, English musicologist (d.1969)
- November 15 – Annunzio Mantovani Italian-born British orchestra leader and composer (d. 1980)
- November 19 – Tommy Dorsey, jazz trombonist and brother of Jimmy Dorsey (d. 1956)
- November 21 – Ted Ray, comedian and violinist (d. 1977)
- November 24 – Harry Barris, US singer, composer and pianist (d. 1962)
- December 7 – Charles Magnante, accordionist, composer, arranger, author, and educator (d. 1986)
- December 8 – Ernst Hermann Meyer, German (later East German) musicologist and composer (d. 1988)
- December 31 – Jule Styne, composer (d. 1994)

== Deaths ==
- January 4 – Theodore Thomas, conductor (b. 1835)
- January 5 – Belle Cole, operatic contralto (b. 1845)
- January 10 – Kārlis Baumanis, composer (b. 1835)
- January 22 – Alfred Dörffel, German pianist (born 1821)
- January 24 – Anna Mooney Burch, American soprano (born c. 1862)
- February 10 – Ignacy Krzyżanowski, composer (b. 1826)
- February 12 – Edward Dannreuther, pianist (b. 1844)
- March 15 – Luigi Manzotti, choreographer (b. 1835)
- April 12 – Giuseppe Gariboldi, flautist and composer (b. 1833)
- April 29 – Ignacio Cervantes, pianist and composer (b. 1847)
- May 5 – Ernst Pauer, pianist (b. 1826)
- May 13 – Sam S. Shubert, Broadway impresario (b. 1878) (rail crash)
- May 14 – Jessie Bartlett Davis, operatic contralto (b. 1859)
- May 15 – Andrey Schulz-Evler, composer and arranger (b. 1852)
- May 31 – Franz Strauss, musician and composer, father of Richard Strauss (b. 1822)
- June 9 – Henry Behning, Sr., piano maker (b. 1832)
- July 8 – Walter Kittredge, self-taught musician and composer (b. 1834)
- August 25 – Felix vom Rath, composer (born 1866)
- August 28 – Yannis Apostolou, Greek tenor who performed widely in Italy under the name Giovanni Apostolu (b. 1860)
- August 31 – Francesco Tamagno, operatic tenor (b. 1850)
- September 22 – Célestine Marié, mezzo-soprano, the first "Carmen" (b. 1837)
- October 18 – Emmie Owen, opera singer (b. 1871)
- December 9 – Henry Holmes, composer and violinist (b. 1839)
