= Mary Maxwell Campbell =

Scottish songwriter, composer and poet

- Born: 19 November 1812; Riccarton in Ayrshire
- Died: 15 January 1886 (aged 73); 1, Gillespie Terrace in St Andrews
- Occupations: Songwriter, Composer and Poet
- Known for: "March of the Cameron Men"

Mary Maxwell Campbell (19 November 1812 – 15 January 1886) was a Scottish songwriter, composer, and poet known chiefly for the song "March of the Cameron Men".

== Life ==
Mary Maxwell Campbell was born at Riccarton in Ayrshire with her twin, Isabella, on 19 November 1812. She was one of ten children of Dugald John Campbell of Skerrington and his wife Janet Baillie of Polkemmet. She was a gifted composer and lyricist from an early age. Her first and most famous piece, "The March of the Cameron Men" first appeared in print in James Davie's Caledonian Repository in 1829 when she was just 16. Originally published anonymously, Campbell only revealed herself as the author of the march after others began to claim authorship and it was not until 1866 that the piece was published with her name attached.

A gifted musician, she set many of her own pieces to music, many of which were targeted at children. She produced a series of songs with music for children and her pieces were included in many anthologies of Scottish poets in her own lifetime. She never married and in later years lived with her sister Jessie Skene of Pitlour, at St Andrews. She was well connected in literary circles throughout her life and was a friend and correspondent of the poet Agnes Strickland and literary critic Principal Shairp, for whom she wrote the music to his poem "The Lass of Loch Linnhe". She died at her home at 1, Gillespie Terrace in St Andrews on 15 January 1886.

== March of the Cameron Men ==
The song relays the story of Donald Cameron of Lochiel's part in the Jacobite Rising of 1745. Campbell composed the song while travelling through the Scottish Highlands with a member of the Cameron family of Lochiel. She originally intended the piece for piano accompanied voice, but later arranged a version for bagpipes. It commonly features in the set-list of the Queen's Own Cameron Highlanders and has become closely associated with Clan Cameron.

== Other works ==
- Lament for Glencoe
- The Mole and the Bat
- O, What Will We Do in the Morning
- The Menagerie
- The Lass of Loch Linnhe (music)

== Legacy ==
March of the Cameron Men has become the signature march of many pipebands, including The Cameron Highlanders of Ottawa and as a song, has been recorded by many artists, including Robert Watkin-Mills, Harold Jarvis, and Kenneth McKellar.

In 2018, as part of Minerva Scientifica, a project run by the National Library of Scotland, the lyrics to "March of the Cameron Men" were reworked by Frances M Lynch and Herbie Clark and recorded as "The March of the Women of Science" to celebrate the link between women scientists and composers.

In Sara Sheridan's 2019 book, Where are the Women? A Guide to an Imagined Scotland, a fictional exhibit to Campbell features in the "Magdalene" Trust Museum and Gardens.
