= Loyola School, Thiruvananthapuram =

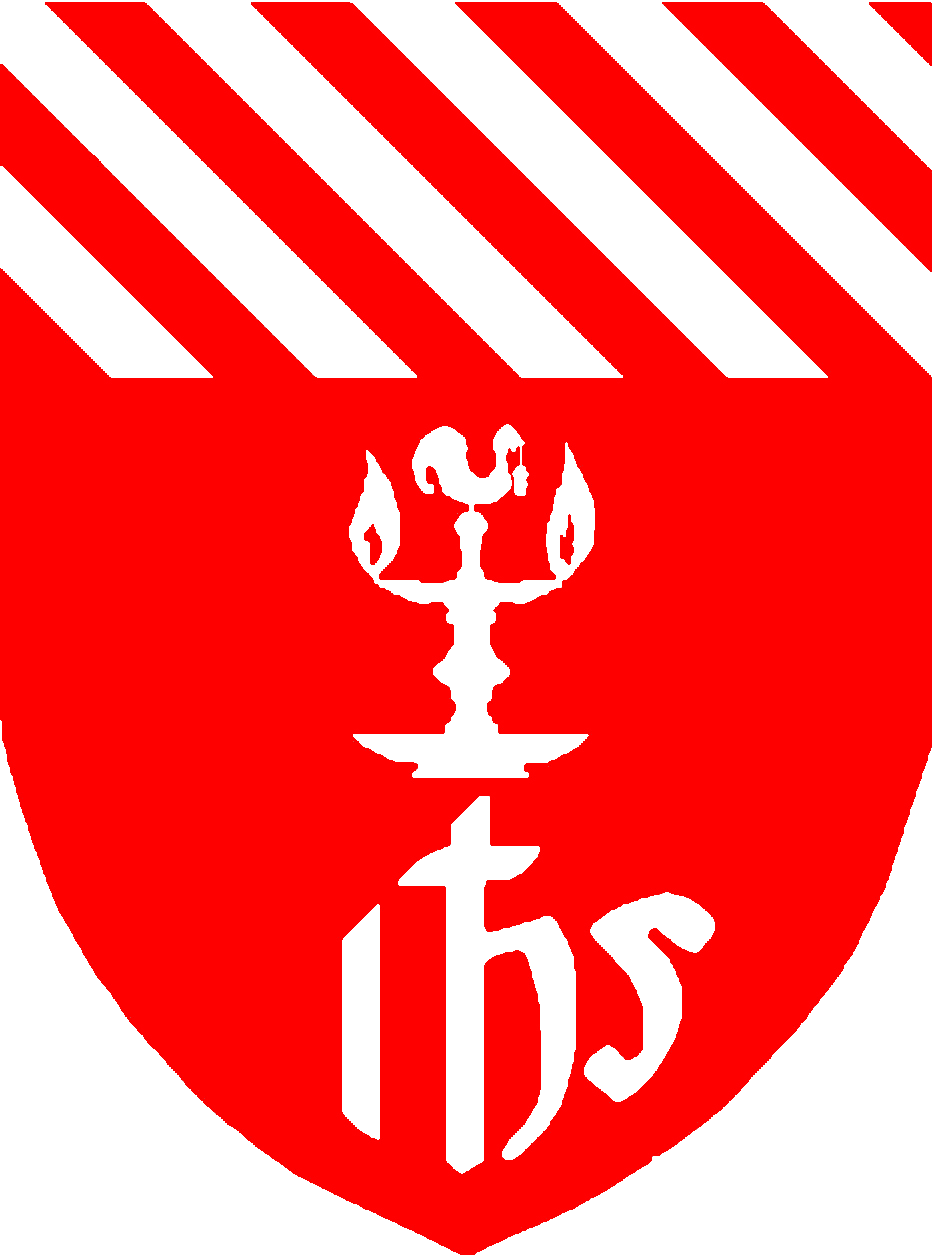

Location
- Sreekariyam, Thiruvananthapuram, Kerala; India; 8°32′32″N 76°54′43″E

Information
- Type: Private primary and secondary school
- Motto: Latin: Magis (Greater; More)
- Religious affiliation: Catholicism
- Denomination: Jesuits
- Patron saint: Ignatius of Loyola
- Established: 1961; 65 years ago
- Founder: Fr. Joseph Edamaram, SJ
- Authority: Council for the Indian School Certificate Examinations (CISCE); Central Board of Secondary Education (CBSE); SCERT; Indian School Certificate (ISC); HSE
- Rector: Fr. Sunny Kunnappallil, SJ
- Principal: Fr.Salvin Augustine SJ
- Gender: Co-ed
- Enrollment: 3,000
- Campus size: 8 acres (3.2 ha)
- Campus type: Suburban
- Colours: Black and white
- Song: Cheer Loyola's Scions
- Sports: Basketball, cricket, football, track and field, aerobics, table tennis
- Website: loyolaschooltrivandrum.com

Loyola School, Thiruvananthapuram is a private Catholic primary and secondary school located in Sreekariyam, Thiruvananthapuram, in the state of Kerala, India. Founded in 1961, the school has been run by the Jesuits since its establishment.

== History ==
In 1960, Fr. Joseph Edamaram, S.J., the first Provincial of the Jesuits in the independent Kerala province, helped found Loyola School and the adjacent Loyola College of Social Sciences in Thiruvananthapuram. In June 1961, Loyola School was established at Palayam, with Fr. K.V. John S.J. as the first Principal and 36 students on the rolls. In 1962, the school was temporarily shifted to a campus in Monvila, followed by the establishment of a boarding house. Fr. P.C. Anthony, S.J. followed Fr. K.V. John S.J. as the school's principal.

In 1963, the school was eventually transplanted to its present campus, followed by the introduction of the ISC course and an affiliation with the Cambridge University, due to the efforts of the third Principal, Fr. Antony Vachaparambil, S.J. Fr. John Kunjaparambil, S.J., the fifth Principal, introduced weekly assemblies, the offices of the School Captain and the General Secretary, in May 1964. He also introduced four houses - Panthers, Leopards, Lions and Tigers, and is also credited with the promotion of sports and other activities in the school.

The blueprint of the main-wing of the present-day three-story ICSE block was prepared in 1967 when Fr. Mathew Pulickal, S.J. was the Vice-Principal, and the construction was completed in 1970, along with the carving-out of the main playground. A separate single-story Junior school compound and a pavilion-cum-canteen complex were erected in 1971-73, which got the school recognized by the Indian Central Government as the first boys-only school in Kerala for the placement of National Merit Scholars.

Notable dignitaries who have visited the school include Mother Teresa and A.P.J. Abdul Kalam.

== Courses ==
=== ICSE & ISC ===
Loyola has been affiliated to the Council for the Indian School Certificate Examinations (CISCE), New Delhi, since its founding. Initially the school offered only the higher secondary level Indian School Certificate, Class XI up to year 1976 and thereafter Class XII (ISC) examination course. The Indian School Certificate (both Class XI until 1976 and Class XII thereafter) are recognized by the University of Kerala and many Indian universities as equivalent to a Senior High School Certificate or Pre-Degree Certificate or Higher Secondary School Certificate for admission to university studies. In 1991 Loyola began the secondary level (ICSE) examination course, with the first ICSE batch graduating in 1993. Typically, only those students who opted for the ICSE course in high school were placed in the ISC program after passing the ICSE examination, though exceptions were made for outstanding students from the SSLC stream as well as from other schools.

=== SSLC & HSC ===
In the 1970s, Loyola began offering high school students another option: the syllabus of the Government of Kerala in preparation for the Secondary School Leaving Certificate (SSLC) examination. When the Government of Kerala abolished the university affiliated Pre-Degree Course (PDC) and replaced it with the State Council for Educational Research and Training (SCERT) affiliated Higher Secondary Course (HSC), Loyola also adopted the newly introduced course as a higher secondary level option for students. Typically, those students who opted for the SSLC course in high school were automatically placed in the HSC program after passing the SSLC examination. In 2008, Loyola started phasing out the SSLC course, starting with the eighth standard. LENS, Loyola's student newsletter, reported that poor demand was the reason for the phasing out of the SSLC course. In 2017, Loyola school stopped the SSLC/HSC batch. However, Loyola school has restarted their SSLC/HSC/HSE batch in 2025.

=== CBSE ===
In the decade after 2000, Loyola started a separate Central Board of Secondary Education (CBSE) affiliated section in the same campus. Initially, only the secondary level CBSE course was offered, with the first tenth standard CBSE batch graduating in 2007. In 2008, Loyola added the higher secondary level CBSE course to its offerings, with the first twelfth standard CBSE batch graduating in 2010.

== Achievements ==
- Ranked as 2nd best ICSE school in India based on board examination results
- Ranked First in Kerala and 17th in India in the Day Boys' School category in the EW India School Rankings 2020-2021
- Won The Hindu Young World Quiz in 2012
- Winner of The Hindu Young World Quiz at the national level in 2000, 2011, and 2012.
- Winner of The Hindu Young World Quiz at the Thiruvananthapuram regional finals from 2000 to 2007, in 2012, and in 2017.

== Cultural activities ==
=== Other quiz competitions ===
In 2008, Loyolites won the Kerala leg of the TCS IT Wiz, were runners-up in 2002, 2004, 2005, 2006 and 2009, and finalists in 2010. In 2006, Loyolites won the inaugural edition of the National Aerospace Olympiad conducted by the Aeronautical Society of India in Chandigarh, winning both the quiz rounds in the process. From 1999 to 2003 Loyolites maintained a winning streak in both the ICSE and ISC Kerala state level quizzes. In 2006, teams from Loyola won the Kerala state level ICSE and ISC quizzes and both teams went on to be crowned national champions. In 2006, Loyolites were the national champions at the inaugural edition of T.I.M.E. Aqua Regia, a national level science quiz. In 2002, a team from Loyola was one of the three national finalists in the ESPN School Quiz, after having topped both the south zone finals and one of the two national semi-finals of the competition.

== Sports ==
=== Basketball ===
Basketball is considered the school's official sport and was very popular among the students until the late 1990s. The annual Loyola Junior Invitation Basketball Tournament, with participation from several schools in Thiruvananthapuram, had been a fixture in Loyola's calendar over several decades. The school basketball team won laurels at various competitions, such as the St. Thomas Cup and Christ Nagar Cup, and participated in the city league. A few state-level players came out of the program.

=== Cricket ===
Though Loyola had cricket teams up to the early 1980s, interest waned during the 1980s and 1990s. But with the declining popularity of basketball cricket experienced a resurgence from the turn of the century. Loyola now has a cricket training academy called Loyola Cricket Academy (LCA). The LCA team participates in regional cricket tournaments. Trainees of the academy have been part of regional and national level junior cricket teams. Cricket teams from the school have toured Sri Lanka and in turn hosted tours from that country. Over the years Loyola has produced some promising cricketers. Although basketball is the school game, Loyolites show a special interest in cricket. In anticipation of the India - New Zealand T20 match in Thiruvananthapuram on 7 November, the 12th students directed a video in dedication to all the Malayalis who love cricket.

=== Football ===
Football is popular at Loyola, with several games on the main field during lunch breaks. Football coaching began in the summer vacation of 2003. In November 2003 Loyola's team made the semi-finals of the sports festival held at Christ Nagar School, Thiruvananthapuram. In 2007 the Loyola football team won the Shri. Sasidhara Kurup Memorial Interschool Football Tournament in Thiruvananthapuram. Then in 2008 it won the Thiruvananthapuram district high school championship as well as the St. Thomas football trophy. The 2017-18 school team won the South Zone CBSE Sahodaya and also bagged the best player and best goalkeeper awards.

== School symbols ==
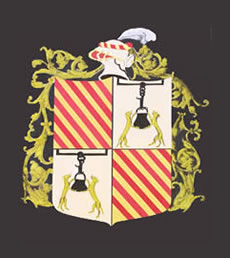
The shield of Oñaz-Loyola

=== School crest ===
The Loyola crest is in the form of a red shield with seven red bars on the top, a Nilavilakku in the center, and at the bottom the Christogram IHS (the first three letters of "Jesus" in Greek). The seven red bars at the top are from the shield of Oñaz-Loyola, the family of Ignatius of Loyola, the founder of the Society of Jesus. The Nilavilakku, a traditional lamp used in Kerala, symbolizes the culture of Kerala where the school is located, and also light, wisdom, and education. Taken as a whole, the school crest means: Loyola School where Jesuits are serving the people of Kerala in education. The renowned architect Laurie Baker, whose son Tilak studied in Loyola, designed the crest.

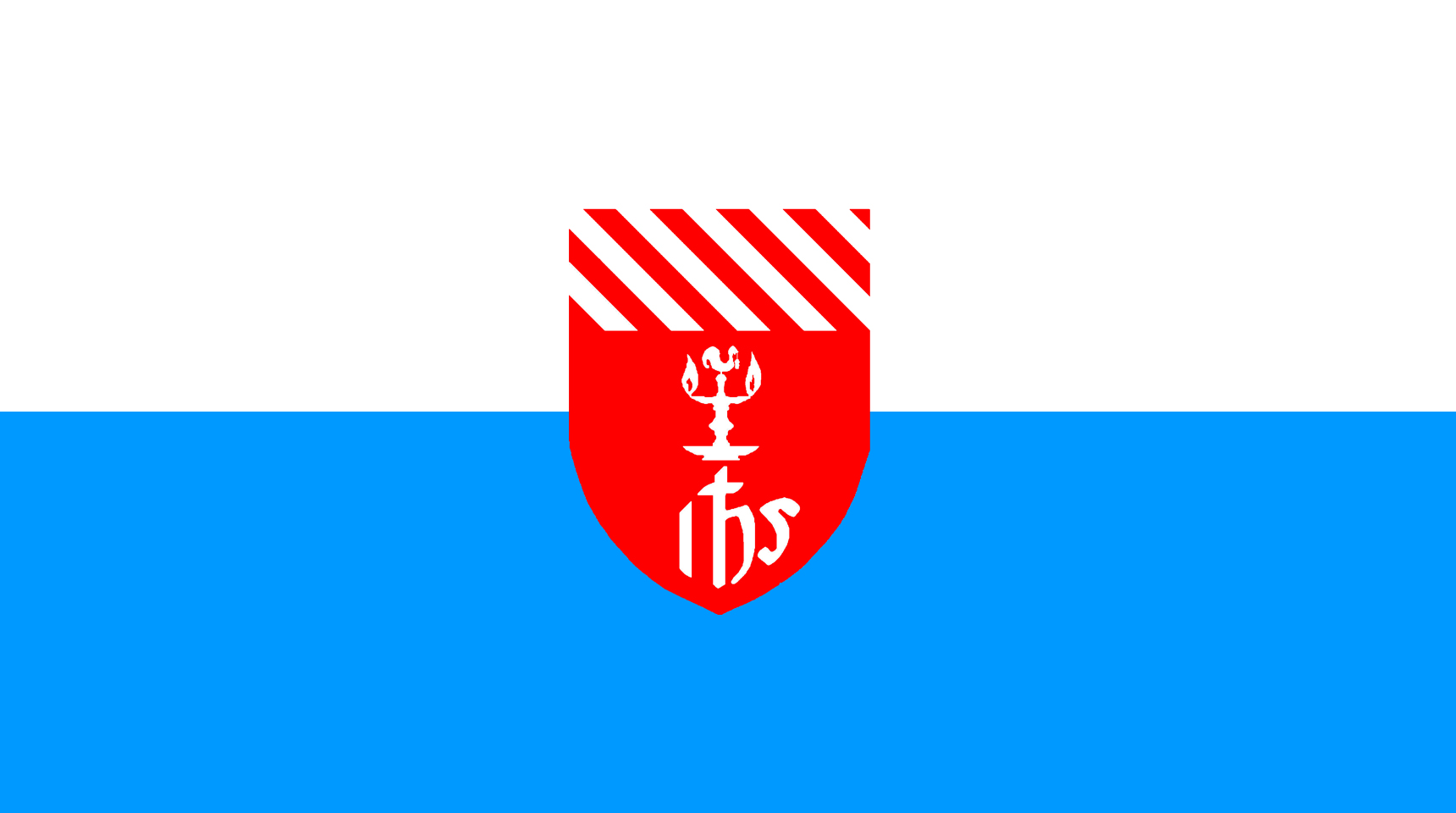
School flag

=== School flag ===
The flag is the school crest emblazoned on rectangular bands of white and blue. The use of the school flag is reserved for ceremonial occasions, like weekly school assemblies where it is hoisted, preceding the singing of the school song, and at the head of the march past of houses during the annual Sports Day.

=== School song ===
Cheer Loyola's sons is the school song of Loyola. It is written as a hymn with three verses. The music and parts of lyrics of the song are adapted from Sound the battle cry, a hymn written and composed by William Fiske Sherwin, a nineteenth-century American composer. The lyrics of Cheer Loyola's sons are replete with sports imagery and call on Loyolites to cheer till the "game is won" for the school. This imagery is a legacy of the original song (Sound the battle cry), written in the form of a battle hymn connoting spiritual warfare.

== Publications ==

=== The Loyolite ===
Loyola School publishes an annual journal/yearbook called The Loyolite, chronicling the important events of the current academic year. It also includes an annual report written by the Principal, group photographs of all classes as well as the staff, contributions by alumni as well as by the students in Malayalam, English, and Hindi.

=== LENS ===
Loyola English News Service is a periodical brought out by the senior students covering events on campus. It is a wall magazine and is available on the internet.

== Alumni ==
Alumni of Loyola are called ex-Loyolites or Loyola old boys. The school has an alumni association called Loyola Old Boys' Association (LOBA) that is part of the World Union of Jesuit Alumni (WUJA).

=== Notable alumni ===
- Basant Balaji - Judge, Kerala High Court.
- Pulickel Ajayan (1977), professor of engineering
- Karan Bilimoria (1971), entrepreneur and British life peer
- Rajesh Gopakumar (1984), theoretical physicist
- Air Marshal Sreedhara Panicker Radha Krishnan Nair, PVSM, AVSM, VM – former Commander-in-Chief of the Indian Air Force (1974)
- IGP Anoop Kuruvila John IPS
- Rajeev Nath, film director
- Mithun Ramesh, actor and television presenter
- K. S. Sabarinathan (2001), politician
- Sangeeth Sivan, film director and screenwriter
- Santosh Sivan (1976), cinematographer, film director, producer, actor and recipient of the Padma Shri
- Sreenath Sreenivasan (1987), technological journalist, communications professional and academic
- Raj Subramaniam, CEO of FedEx
- Nimish Ravi(2012), Cinematographer

== See also ==
- List of Jesuit schools
- List of schools in Kerala
- Violence against Christians in India
