= Alexander Witting =

German mathematician

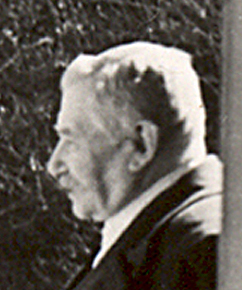
- Witting in 1938
- Born: 18 December 1861; Dresden
- Died: 29 November 1946 (aged 84); Dresden
- Education: Georg-August-Universität, Göttingen
- Scientific career
- Fields: Mathematics
- Thesis: Über eine der Hesseschen Konfiguration der ebenen Kurve 3. Ordnung analoge Konfiguration im Raume ... (1886)
- Doctoral advisor: Felix Klein

Carl Johann Adolf Alexander Witting (18 December 1861 – 29 November 1946) was a German mathematician.

== Family ==
Witting was born in Dresden as the first child of the musician Carl Witting (1823–1907) and the painter Minna Witting, née Japha (1828–1882).

Alexander Witting married the pianist Sophie Sebass (1864–1924) in 1889. They had two daughters and a son: Tillyta (1890–1970), Lotte (1894–1971) and the physicist Rudolf Witting (1899–1963). In view of the artistically affected family environment – father musician, mother painter, aunt Louise Japha (1826–1910) pianist, sister Agnes Witting (1863–1937) singer, brother Walther Witting painter – it does not surprise that Alexander Witting also sometimes painted and regularly made music, even beyond the narrow circle of family or colleagues.

== Education ==
He successfully completed his final grammar school examinations at the Städtische Gymnasium zum Heiligen Kreuz (Kreuzschule) in Dresden at Easter 1880, served his military service for one year and commenced the study at the teachers department of the Polytechnikum Dresden at the summer term 1881. In spring 1885 he successfully completed the examinations for teachers at secondary schools, authorizing him for mathematics and physics in all classes of grammar schools and junior highs, as well as for geography excluding the preparations of the final secondary school examinations.

A travel grant of the Polytechnikum allowed him to earn a doctorate, possible in those days at universities only. On 1 April 1885 Witting commenced his probationary year as teacher at the Thomasschule in Leipzig, and at the same time he attended courses and seminars at the Leipzig University, especially under Felix Klein, from whom he also received the topic for his dissertation. On 4 August 1886 he was accredited with a PhD at the Georg-August-Universität in Göttingen, the new work-place of Felix Klein.

== Career as a teacher ==
From 1 December 1886 he worked as permanent teacher at the Städtische Gymnasium zum Heiligen Kreuz (Kreuzschule) by the will of the council of city Dresden. There Witting taught until his retirement as schoolmaster, lecturer, senior teacher, and professor. Extra officially he assisted for a long time at the chair for descriptive geometry of the TH Dresden, and he designed advertising brochures for the renowned concern Koch & Stenzel at Dresden.

Alexander Witting was one of those secondary-school teachers, who remained being associated with the development of their science, and who published frequently themselves. As teacher of a grammar school with close contacts to both, high schools and praxis, he was open-minded to the reforms movement for mathematics and natural science education, which to the end of the 1880s / beginnings of 1890s gained strength. Felix Klein, being elected as leader of the international mathematics education commission (IMUK), consulted Alexander Witting for the papers published by the IMUK. Der mathematische Unterricht an den Gymnasien und Realanstalten und die Ausbildung der Lehramtskandidaten im Königreich Sachsen, (The mathematics class at grammar schools and junior highs, and the education of teachers in the Saxon kingdom) written by Witting was published 1910. The Verein zur Förderung des mathematischen und naturwissenschaftlichen Unterrichts (development association for mathematics and natural science classes) played an essential role for the reforms movement, esp. because of its grass-roots workload. Alexander Witting was one of its board members for a long time, and too was among the founders of the Förderverein’s very busy local union in Dresden.

As, in the run of these reforms, differential and integral calculus found entrance to the curriculum of secondary schools for the first time (since 1907 in Saxon), a representation of this subject area was needed which was fitting for these students. On this background Walther Lietzmann (1880–1956) and Alexander Witting together with Teubner Verlag established the Mathematisch-Physikalische Bibliothek in Leipzig. Witting not only was co-publisher, he also was author of several multiply reprinted booklets of that series. His booklets on differential and integral calculus were published since the middle of the 1930s in the Göschen compilation – in a highly extended form and supplemented by separate exercise books. For several years from 1911 on, Alexander Witting additionally published Verhandlungen der Gesellschaft Deutscher Naturforscher und Ärzte (Proceedings of the Society of German Natural Scientists and Doctors).

== Politics ==
Beginning in 1891, Witting attended military practices nearly every year. Beside others in World War I he was supervisor of a gas defence course for officers in Dessau and was deployed at a mortar school, reaching the rank of major. His military teachings led him to publish Soldaten-Mathematik (Soldiers' Mathematics) in 1916.

From the end of 1886 Alexander Witting was a member of the Natural Scientific Society ISIS in Dresden and was active in the mathematical section of ISIS, founded in 1875. His ISIS lectures reflected the results of own researches, experiences from being a teacher, as well as from his works in specialist societies.

When the National Socialists took over, Alexander Witting had already retired from teaching. He had been active in World War I, and his achievements about secondary schools were generally honoured. All this taken together caused that (being a "half-Jew" in the sense of the Nuremberg Laws of the National Socialists) he was not bothered too hard. He was not affiliated to the NS teachers alliance, but was at first allowed to join as a guest. He also remained an honorary member of the development association, which in that form only existed until 1936. On his 75th and 80th birthdays he received several official congratulation letters, for instance from the publishing companies Teubner and de Gruyter, but also from the Deutsche Mathematiker-Vereinigung (DMV).

Like any household with a half-Jew, Witting's was not free from certain limitations. The aged Alexander Witting in those days mostly worked at home. The secondary school remained close to his heart up to his end. After the Nazi regime had ended, consideration was to reclaim to positive things. In November 1945 Witting's Aufruf zur Rettung der höheren Schule (call for rescue of secondary school) was published posthumously in Physikalischen Blättern.

== Writings ==
- Der mathematische Unterricht an den Gymnasien und Realanstalten und die Ausbildung der Lehramtskandidaten im Königreich Sachsen. Leipzig und Berlin 1910
- Zur Rettung der höheren Schulen. In: Physikalische Blätter (Neue Physikalische Blätter). 2. Jahrgang 1946, Heft 9, pp. 237–238
- In der Mathematisch-Physikalische Bibliothek – Gemeinverständliche Darstellungen aus der Elementarmathematik und -physik für Schule und Leben herausgegeben von Dir. Dr. W. Lietzmann und Studienrat Dr. A. Witting, B. G. Teubner, Leipzig und Berlin:

– Einführung in die Infinitesimalrechnung, Band 9.
– Beispiele z. Geschichte d. Mathematik, Band 15 (mit M. Gebhardt).
– Soldaten-Mathematik, Band 22.
