= Ted Mack =

Ted Mack may refer to:

- Ted Mack (politician), Edward Mack, Australian politician
- Ted Mack (radio and television host), born William Edward Maguiness, American television host

== See also ==
- Edward Mack, composer
