= Harry Anthony =

American tenor and pioneer recording artist

Harry Anthony (October 29, 1870 – September 5, 1954) was an American tenor and pioneer recording artist. With James F. Harrison he made several recordings of religious music that were popular at the time. He was known as a solo artist, and also became a member of the American Quartet. He made records for most of the major recording companies of the day.

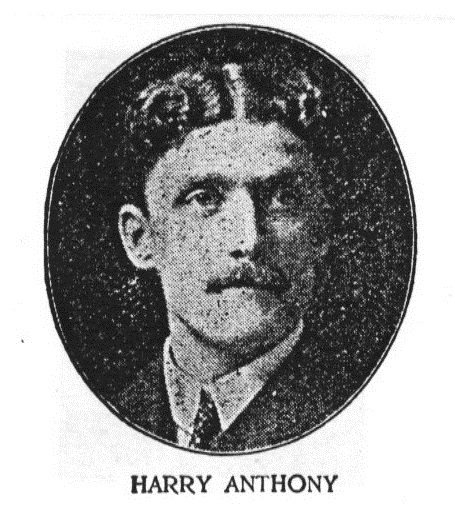
Pioneer recording artist Harry Anthony

== Biography ==
Anthony was born John Young in New York City. He used the pseudonym of Harry Anthony from the beginning of his recording career until 1912, when he began using his real name. Edison, however, continued to use the pseudonym on their releases, although their catalogs also gave his real name. He died in New York City at the age of 83.

== Recording career ==
=== Harrison and Anthony ===
His first recording was a duet with James F. Harrison, a pseudonym for Frederick J. Wheeler, in 1905 on an Edison phonograph cylinder. "Harrison and Anthony" were subsequently paired together for numerous duets, usually specializing in sacred songs (Billy Murray jokingly called them "The-Come-to-Jesus-Twins") or in sentimental ballads. Popular recordings for Edison included Excelsior and Let the Lower Lights Be Burning. The duet made their last phonograph recording for Edison in 1912, although they worked together again for the next couple of years making talking pictures for Edison. Harrison and Anthony also recorded for Columbia Records, both cylinders and discs, starting in 1906. These U.S. Recordings were also issued on English Columbia and Regal. Their work for Columbia lasted until the beginning of the microphone era, when they made a single disc in 1926. Additionally they made cylinders for the U.S. Everlasting Records company from 1910–1912. They also recorded for the Victor Talking Machine Company, it is likely that their rendition of See the Pale Moon, from 1910, was the duet's best-selling record for this company.

=== Solo career ===
As a solo artist, Anthony recorded for both Edison and produced several best sellers. On Edison, these were released on 2-minute cylinders, and included Down Where the Silv’ry Mohawk Flows, When the Mists Have Rolled Away, Love Me and the World Is Mine, and Beautiful Isle of Somewhere, all estimated to have been top-10 hits. Under his real name, John Young, he released several sides for Victor.

=== As member of other groups ===
In 1910 Anthony was recorded as a member of the Edison Comic Opera Company, alongside fellow members Steve Porter, Edith Chapman, Edna Stearns, and Cornelia Marvin. He recorded duets with Inez Barbour, two of which became best sellers: Alma and Love Never Dies in 1911 and 1912, respectively. On Edison cylinders he also recorded duets with Elizabeth Wheeler and Helen Clark. He performed in and managed the Criterion Quartet, who besides Anthony included Donald Chalmers, George W. Reardon, and Horatio Rench. He was a member of Victor’s Orpheus Quartet. In 1918 he replaced John Bieling in the American Quartet. After 1918 he made numerous duets with several of Victor’s established artists such as Reinald Werrenrath.
