= Beautiful Isle of Somewhere =

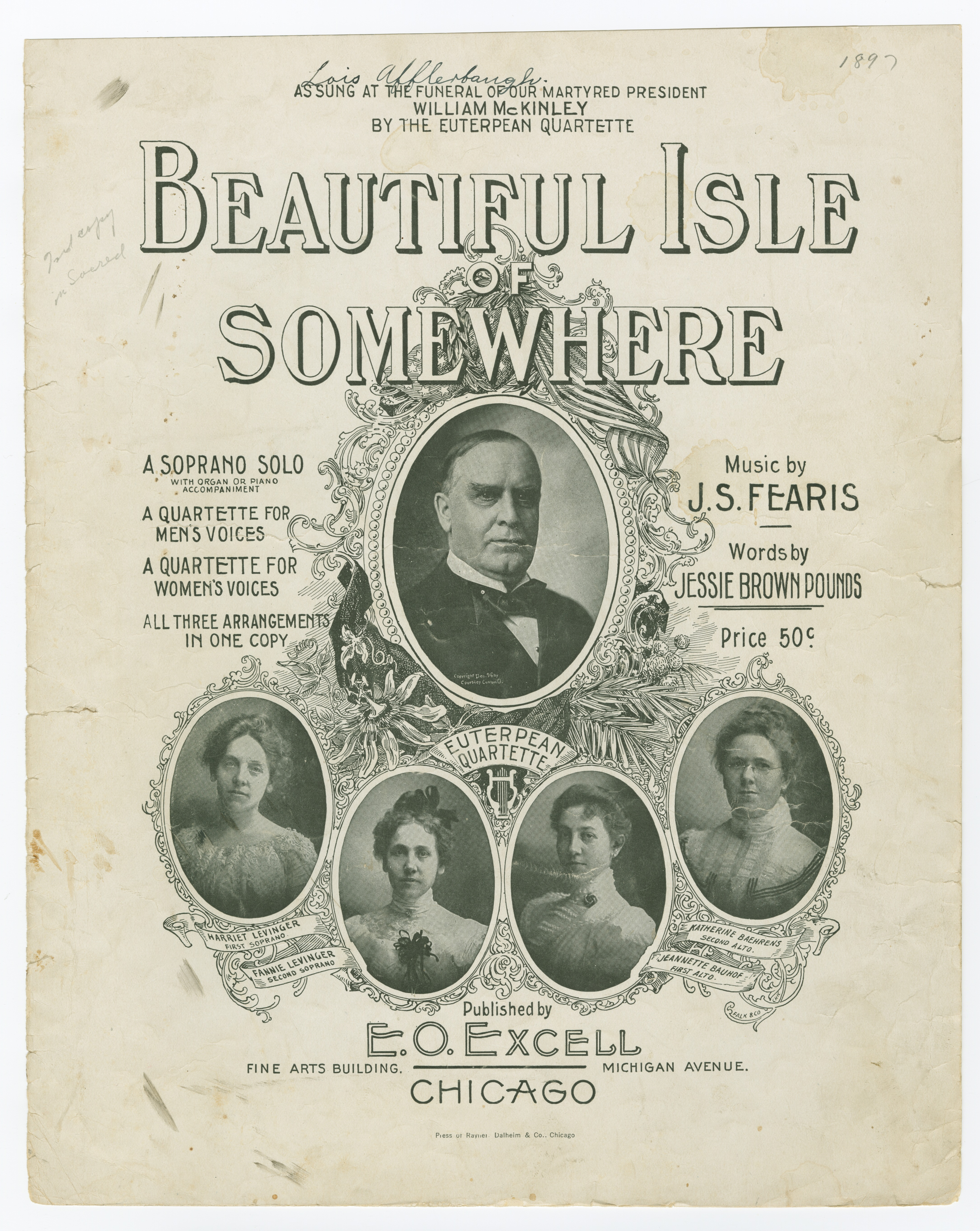
Sheet music cover, c. 1901

"Beautiful Isle of Somewhere"
"Beautiful Isle of Somewhere" performed on a 1908 recording by Harold Jarvis

"Beautiful Isle of Somewhere" is a song with words by Jessie Brown Pounds and music by John Sylvester Fearis, written in 1897. The song gained huge popularity when it was used in William McKinley's funeral. It was subsequently a staple at funerals for decades, and there are dozens of recorded versions.

== History ==
"Beautiful Isle of Somewhere" was originally a poem entitled "Beautiful Isle" by Jessie Brown Pounds. The words were written in the winter of 1896, during a period of miserable weather. Persuaded or possibly forced to stay home, Pounds wrote the lyrics within an hour's time. It was set to music by John S. Fearis, who had purchased the poem for five dollars, and the song was published in 1897.

In 1901, the song was sung by a quartet of young ladies at the beginning of McKinley's funeral in the First Methodist Episcopal Church in his hometown of Canton, Ohio.

A 1908 recording for Edison by Harry Anthony and James Harrison was very popular, as was a 1916 version by John McCormack.

In 1969, Jake Hess won the Grammy Award for Best Inspirational Performance using this song as the title of his album.

== Theme ==
"Beautiful Isle" follows a 19th-century tradition of depicting paradise. The song was written to contrast the difficulties on Earth with the tranquility of Heaven. The hearer is invited to think that in the long term, "all is well" because God is alive. The hymn has appeal at funerals because the lyrics state that "somewhere" we will "live anew".

== Reception ==
The song became highly popular for decades after McKinley’s service. The tune and lyrics have been praised as “beautiful,” but praise for the song has not been universal.

Soon after the McKinley service, the song was panned by The Independent as a singular blot on the memory of the late president. Woodrow Wilson, while governor of New Jersey, stated the song could be harmful if taught to children, as it was "silly" and "vague." The Seventh-day Adventist publication Signs of the Times concurred with the future U. S. president, listing it among songs "inexpressibly weak and shallow". At the same time, John D. Rockefeller was endorsing its use in church.

In 1927, William Henry O'Connell, the Catholic Archbishop of Boston, banned the use of the tune in funerals, calling the hymn "inane" and "trashy." Cardinal O'Connell was concerned it was among a group of songs composed by authors whose "maudlin sentiment" overshadowed their faith. He threatened organists and choir directors who performed the piece with loss of their positions. Several Boston protestant ministers joined in criticizing the song at that time. Defenders of the hymn stated that descriptions of paradise were necessarily allegorical, and worried the ban would spread to other favorite hymns. A 1928 Lutheran publication used O'Connell's exact words when it described the song as a "sob-producer" that was a "flagrant outrage to faith and the ritual."

In 1953, Donald H. V. Hallock. the Episcopal Bishop of Milwaukee, banned the use of this and other "popular" songs from use at Episcopal services as they did not conform to the rubric of the church. Some Christian theologians have taken issue with the song because it describes Heaven in nebulous terms.

Criticisms aside, others have noted that this sentimental song is a "joy to sing."

== Recordings ==
- Andrews Sisters, 1965 from album The Andrews Sisters: Favorite Hymns
- Anthony and Harrison, 1908 on Edison cylinder record 9959.
- Eddy Arnold, 1951 on RCA Victor single 21-0160 (78 rpm) and 48-0166 (45 rpm)
- Gene Autry performs the song in the 1939 film Colorado Sunset
- The Blackwood Brothers, 1960 title track from album Beautiful Isle of Somewhere
- Henry Burr and the Peerless Quartet, 1920 issued on Canadian Victor 216108.
- Floyd Cramer on set 39 Beloved Songs of Faith
- Richard Crooks with Jesse Crawford, 1932 on Victor Red Seal 1558
- Charles Hart and Elliott Shaw, 1923 issued on Federal 5015, Silvertone 2015 and Resona 75015
- Hayden Quartet
- Jake Hess, 1968 on RCA Camden LP Beautiful Isle of Somewhere
- Harold Jarvis, 1909 on Victor 16008 and 1911 on Columbia A-1121
- Frank Luther, 1950 on Decca single 24915
- Mantovani, 1961 from album Songs of Praise
- John McCormack, 1916 on Victor red seal 64428
- Harry Secombe, 2014 on Essential Media Group album How Great Thou Art.
- Oscar Seagle, 1917 on Columbia A2487
- The Southernaires, 1941 on Decca single 3919.
- Jo Stafford, 1954 on Columbia LP Garden of Prayer
- Jo Stafford and Gordon MacRae, 1962 on Columbia LP Whispering Hope
- Marion Talley, 1927 on Victor Red Seal 1248
- Evan Williams
