= John Campbell Shairp =

Scottish critic and man of letters

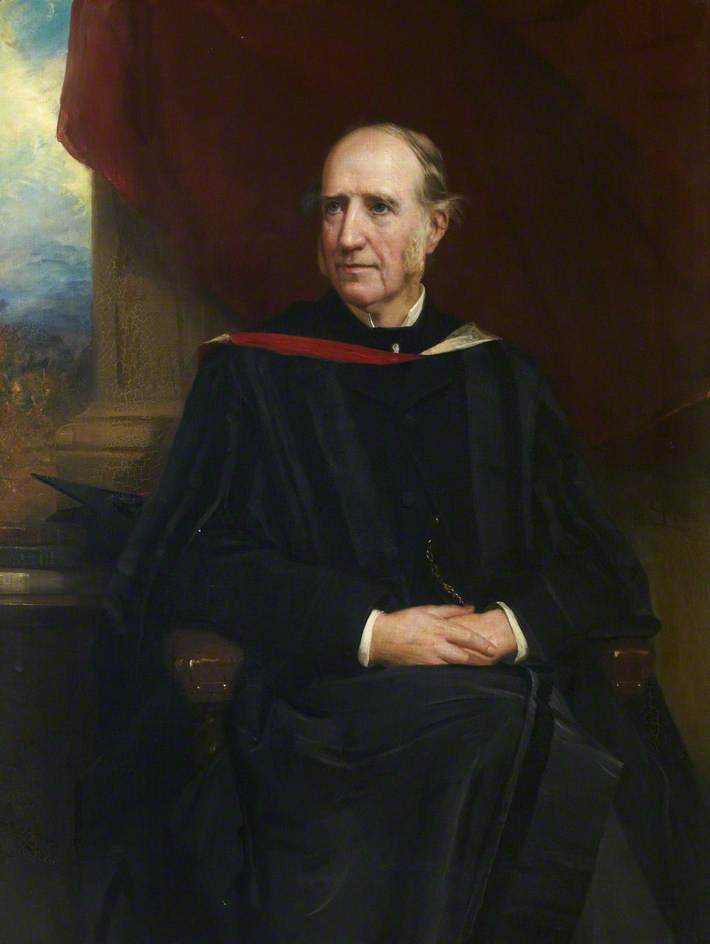
Portrait of Shairp by Robert Inerarity Herdman (1886)

John Campbell Shairp (30 July 1819 – 18 September 1885) was a Scottish critic and man of letters.

== Life ==
He was born at Houstoun House, Linlithgowshire, the third son of Major Norman Shairp of Houstoun, and was educated at Edinburgh Academy and the University of Glasgow.

Shairp gained a Snell exhibition to Balliol College, Oxford in 1840. In 1842 he won the Newdigate prize for a poem on Charles XII of Sweden, and took his degree in 1844. During these years the "Oxford Movement" was at its height. Shairp was stirred by John Henry Newman's sermons, and admired the poetry of John Keble, on whose character and work he wrote an essay; but he remained faithful to his Presbyterian upbringing. After leaving Oxford he took a mastership at Rugby School under Archibald Campbell Tait.

In 1857 Shairp became assistant to the professor of humanity in the University of St Andrews, and in 1861 he was appointed to that chair. In 1868 he was presented to the principalship of the United College, St Andrews, and lectured from time to time on literary and ethical subjects. In 1877 he was elected Professor of Poetry at Oxford in succession to Francis Hastings Doyle. He was re-elected to the chair of poetry in 1882, and discharged his duties there and at St Andrews until the end of 1884. He was a friend and correspondent of the Scottish poet and composer, Mary Maxwell Campbell, who lived at St Andrews.

Shairp died at Ormsary, Argyllshire.

== Works ==
In 1864 Shairp published Kilmahoe, a Highland Pastoral, and in 1868 he republished some articles under the name of Studies in Poetry and Philosophy. A course of lectures was published in 1870 as Culture and Religion. In 1873 Shairp helped to edit the life of his predecessor James David Forbes, and in 1874 he edited Dorothy Wordsworth's Recollections of a Tour in Scotland.

In 1877 Shairp published The Poetic Interpretation of Nature, in which he discussed science and poetry, and Hebrew, classical and English poets. In 1879 he contributed a life of Robert Burns to the "English Men of Letters" series. Lectures from his Oxford Professorship were published in 1881 as Aspects of Poetry. In 1888 appeared Glen Desseray, and other Poems, edited by Francis Turner Palgrave.
