= David C. Bangs =

American recording artist

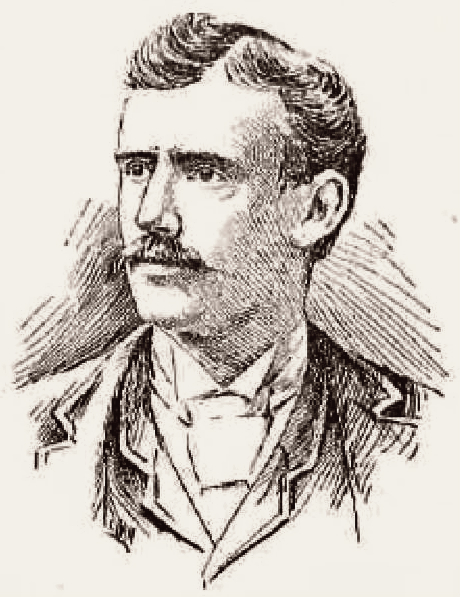
- Born: David Cornelius Bangs; May 25, 1860; Washington, D.C.
- Died: 1935 (aged 74–75); Miami, Florida
- Other names: D.C. Bangs
- Occupation(s): Recording artist, Stenographer
- Years active: 1890s

David Cornelius Bangs (May 25, 1860 – 1935) was an American recording artist of the 1890s specializing in recitations.

== Life and career ==
David Cornelius Bangs was born in Washington D.C. to James Cannon Bangs and Mary Gormley. He graduated from the law school of Columbian University in 1890 and worked as a stenographer. He began recording for the Columbia Phonograph Company in 1893. Though the catalog describing these first recordings is lost, a description in Duane Deakins' "Cylinder Records" notes that Bangs was described as "Late of the Robt. L. Downing Company". 1894 Columbia catalogs prominently featured his "'Rastus Series" of comic recitations in black dialect similar to the "Brudder Rasmus" series recorded by Louis Vasnier for the Louisiana Phonograph Company two years earlier (at this time, both Columbia and Louisiana were both subsidiaries of the North American Phonograph Company).

He continued working as a stenographer for the U.S. Treasury while moonlighting as a recording artist. Between August 1894 and February 1896 he recorded 13 single-sided disc records for the United States Gramophone Company, also based in Washington, expanding into singing songs like The Old Oaken Bucket and "Watermillion Song". He began recording for the Chicago Talking Machine Company by late 1896, performing similar vaudeville-inspired comic recitations like "Old Jed Prouty Crossing the Track" and "P.T. Barnum's Side Show Shouter". His final recordings were made for the Kansas City Talking Machine Company in 1898. Though the catalog contains only four selections, it commends his "voice of great strength, flexibility and sweetness" and a "touch of naturalness and finesse that few public speakers possess".

Bangs married Clara Celia Lake in 1886 and had a son, Roscoe Conkling Bangs (b. 1888) and a daughter, Laura Louise Bangs (b. 1890) in Washington, D.C. He later married an Illinoisan woman named Bertha Ann Sack and had another son, David Jr. (b. 1911), and moved to Illinois, taking clerical work for the Customs Office. He retired to Miami Florida around 1929 and died there in 1935. He was a member of the Sons of the American Revolution.

== See also ==
- Len Spencer
- Cal Stewart
- George Graham
