= Central Tuber Crops Research Institute =

Indian research institute

ICAR-Central Tuber Crops Research Institute
- കേന്ദ്ര കിഴങ്ങുവർഗ്ഗവിള ഗവേഷണകേന്ദ്രം
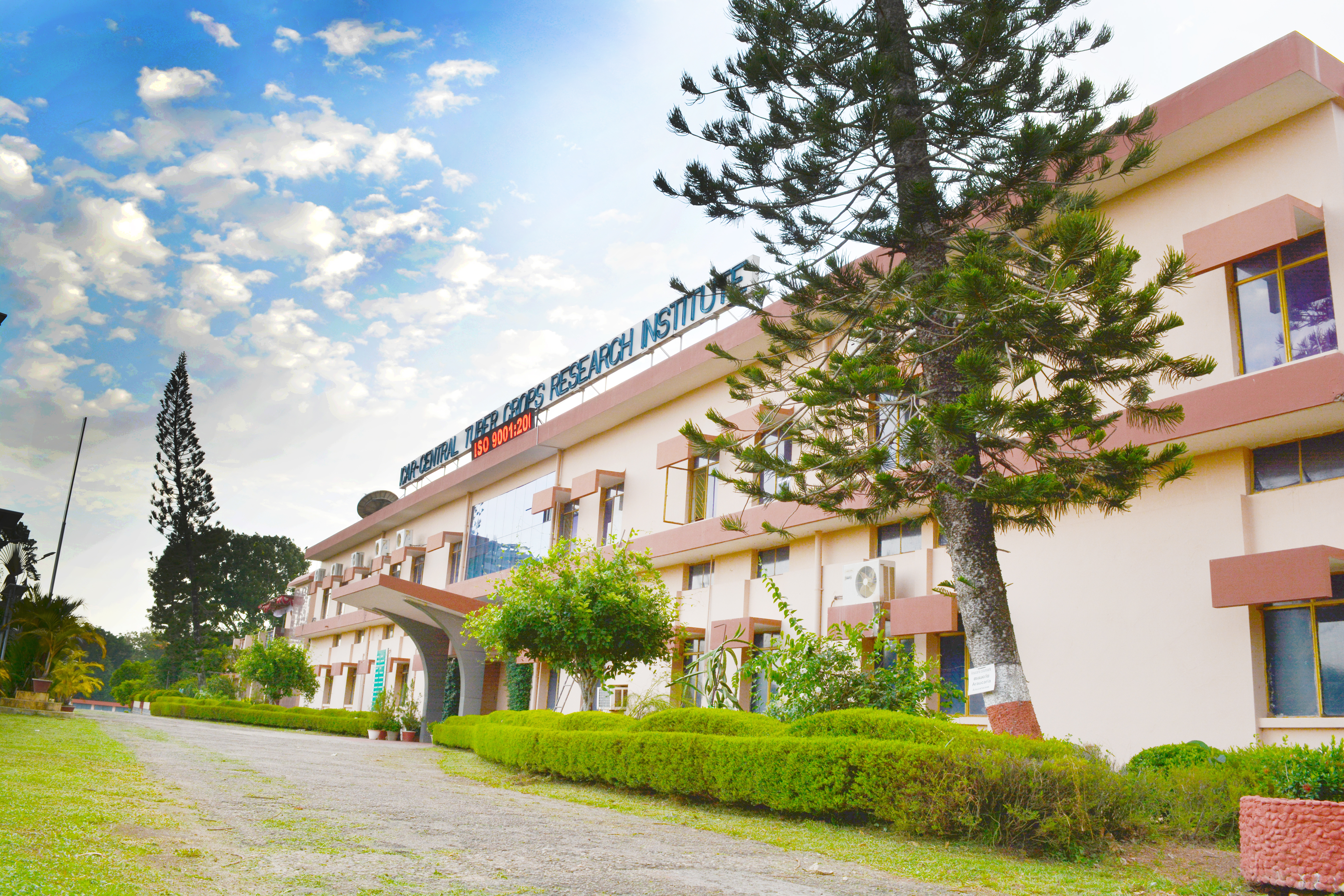
- Established: July 1, 1963; 63 years ago
- Field of research: Tropical tuber crops
- Director: Dr. G. Byju
- Location: Sreekaryam, Kerala, 695017, India; 8.5443°N 76.9123°E
- Operating agency: Indian Council of Agricultural Research
- Website: www.ctcri.org
- Location in Sreekaryam

The ICAR-Central Tuber Crops Research Institute, often abbreviated as ICAR-CTCRI, is a constituent institute under the Indian Council of Agricultural Research (ICAR) is the only research organization in the world dedicated solely to the research on tropical tuber crops. The Institute established in 1963 with its headquarters at Thiruvananthapuram, Kerala has with an area of 48.19 hectares. The headquarters of ICAR - CTCRI is located at Sreekaryam at a distance 12 km away from Thiruvananthapuram International Airport and 10 km from Thiruvananthapuram Central railway station as well as Central Bus Station Thiruvananthapuram. The Institute has a regional centre at Bhubaneswar, Orissa established in 1976 with an area of 20 hectares located 8 km from Bhubaneswar Airport and 7 km from Bhubaneswar railway station to cater the needs of Eastern India.

== Research ==
Research on tropical tuber crops is the primary mandate of CTCRI. Each division of CTCRI concentrate its research programmes on separate aspects of tuber crops. Crop improvement division focus its activities on collection germplasm of different tuber crops from different parts of the world and conserving it in field gene bank as well as in vitro. Development of new varieties of tuber crops with higher yield and other attributes suitable for industrial applications as well as for food purpose is another important activity of this division. Crop production division is engaged in developing new agro techniques for tropical tuber crops in different agro climatic regions. Crop protection division develop strategies and products for managing pests and diseases affecting tropical tuber crops. Crop utilization division concentrates its activities on value addition and post harvest processing of tropical tuber crops. Section of Extension and social sciences is involved in transferring the technologies developed by CTCRI to its clienteles.
