= Young World Quiz =

Quiz competition in India

The Hindu Young World Quiz is a quiz competition in India. It is a live quiz contest held for students of classes 3 - 9, consisting of a Junior Quiz (classes 3-6) and a Senior Quiz (classes 7-9). It is part of The Hindu's 'Newspapers in Education' initiative. According to The Hindu Young World, it is the biggest live quiz show for middle and high school students in India. The competition is hosted by quiz master V. V. Ramanan, a regular quiz columnist for various publications of the Kasturi & Sons group including The Hindu, Sportstar and Hindu Business Line. The First Edition of the question appeared in the year 2000, and has completed 20 years (2020).

== Junior Quiz (classes 3-6) ==
In 2002, it was held in eleven cities, with 3000 teams from over 1200 schools participating. The grand finale of The Hindu Young World Quiz 2012 was held at Chennai in Tamil Nadu, on 7 December 2012 and was won by Loyola School of Trivandrum.

In 2014, P. Adithya Sai and H. Aravind of class 5 from Sanghamitra School defeated their opponents by a huge margin in Hyderabad. In 2014, Kaveri Krishnan and Saraswathy Ashok of class 5 from Vidyodaya school made history by winning the first prize & as the defending champions.

The sponsors were Firefox, Success notebooks etc. for the quiz in 2014.

In 2016, P.Adithya Sai and J.Shraman (Junior Category) of Sanghamitra School defeated their opponents with a large margin in the 16 edition of the quiz which was held in Hyderabad .

In 2018, Arghya Shubhshiv and Rushil Rawat of Delhi Public School, Noida, won the junior quiz. The final round held after a written preliminaries saw some high scoring and the cutoff was high. The Noida team was off to a flyer and maintained a comfortable lead to win with a margin of 100 points from Amity.

In the Bengaluru edition of the quiz in 2024, the quizzing duo of Mayank G Mattur and Hemanshu VM from Sri Kumaran Public School, Mallasandra won the Junior finals comfortably after many high scoring rounds with different branches Sri Kumaran winning the second place as well as the fourth place

== Senior Quiz (classes 7-9) ==
In 2019, In The 19th edition of The Hindu Young World Quiz, was held on 14 February, Thursday with over 400 students from more than 34 schools participating in the event. The team from Delhi Public School, Noida, comprising Asher Kaul and Rushil Rawat secured the first position in the senior category. The second position too was secured by the same school, comprising Arghya Shubhshiv and Aditya Gautam.

The 2019 Seniors event was held in Chennai on 12 February at AM Jain College, The first and second places were both taken by teams from Petit Seminaire Higher Secondary School, Pondicherry. Twin brothers Sanjeev and Shandeep emerged victorious.

In the 2020 Chennai finals (seniors) Petit Seminaire HSS emerged the champion yet again, the winning students this time being Eshwar balaji and Sanjay.

In the 2020 Kochi finals (seniors) Neeraj B Nair and Hrishikesh Varma won.

In 2025 Bengaluru finals, the duo of Hemanshu VM and Mayank G Mattur once again continued their winning streak by winning the senior finals by scoring more than 100 points and winning by a crushing margin.
