= Sreekaryam =

Sreekariyam
- City Area
- Location in Kerala, India Sreekariyam (India)
- Coordinates: 8.5488°N 76.9173°E
- Country: India
- State: Kerala
- District: Thiruvananthapuram

Government
  - Body: Trivandrum Corporation

Languages
  - Official: Malayalam, English
- Time zone: UTC+5:30 (IST)
- PIN: 695017, 695016
- Vehicle registration: KL-22

Sreekaryam is a locality in Thiruvananthapuram, capital of Kerala, India. It is located 3 km north of Ulloor and is about 11 km away from Thiruvananthapuram Central Railway Station. It is situated midway between Kazhakoottam and Palayam It is almost 6 km far from Kazhakoottam. Famous educational institutions like Loyola School, Thiruvananthapuram and College of Engineering Trivandrum (CET) are situated in Sreekaryam. The headquarters of ICAR-Central Tuber Crops Research Institute (ICAR-CTCRI) is also located at Sreekaryam.

Sreekaryam comes under Kazhakkoottam legislative assembly constituency and Thiruvananthapuram Lok Sabha constituency.

Sreekaryam is home to Mar Baselios Mar Gregorios Orthodox Church under the Malankara Orthodox Diocese of Trivandrum. The current parish has 151 Malankara Orthodox families.

== Transportation ==
National Highway 66, which connects Mumbai and Kanyakumari passes through Sreekaryam.

== Law and Order ==
The law and order of the locality is maintained by Sreekaryam Police Station. The station has a jurisdictional area of around 19.5sq.km. Sreekaryam Police Station comes under the Medical College circle.

Sreekaryam Police Station was inaugurated by Shri Oommen Chandy on 03.01.2006.

== See also ==
- Ulloor
- Kazhakootam

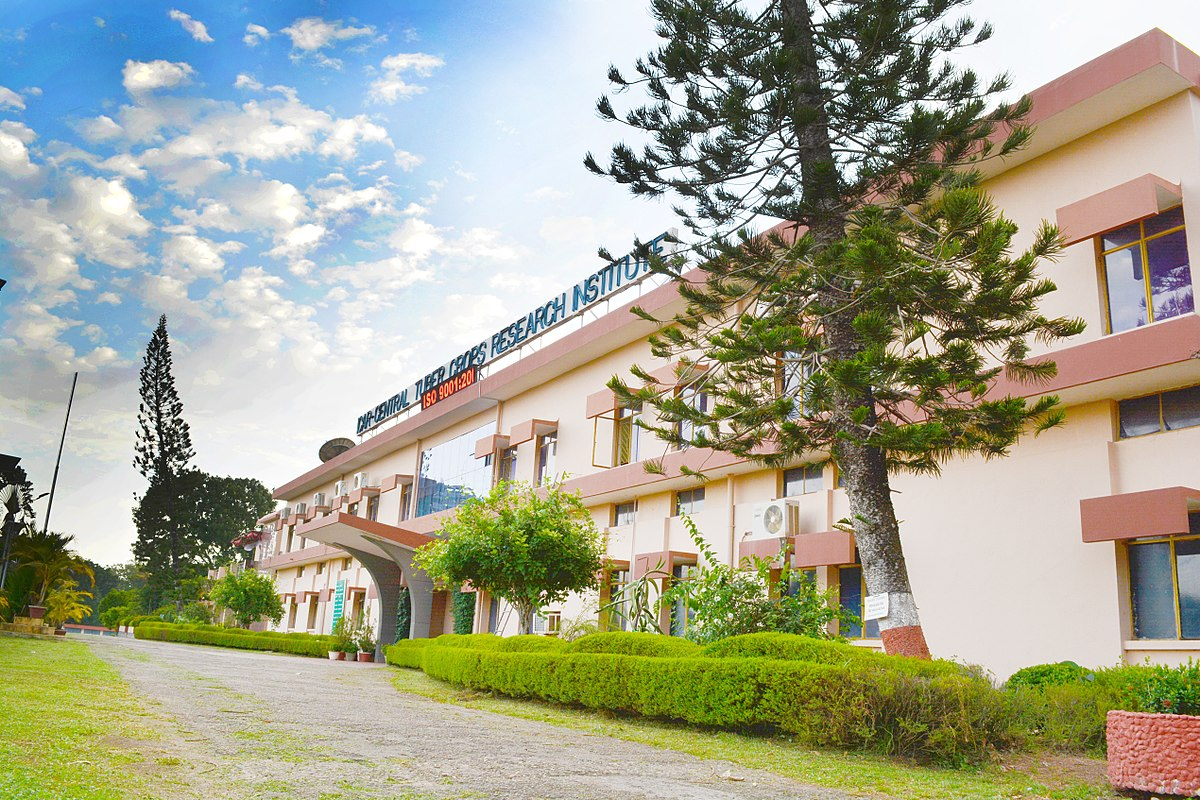
Central Tuber Crops Research Institute, Sreekariyam
