= Fritz Feldmann (musicologist) =

Fritz Feldmann (October 18, 1905 – September 29, 1984) was a German musicologist who was an authority on the music of Silesia and eastern Germany, and on medieval music and Renaissance music. He studied musicology with Max Schneider and Arnold Schmitz at the University of Breslau (UB) where he earned his doctorate in 1931 and his Habilitation in 1937. He served as acting director of the music school at the UB from 1939 to 1941; a position he left when conscripted into the German Army during World War II. After the war he worked as a teacher in Hamburg; ultimately becoming a lecturer at Hamburg University in 1950. In 1954 he was made a professor at the Hochschule für Musik und Theater Hamburg (then known as the Staatliche Musikhochschule) where he remained for many years. He contributed articles to several journals and was editor of the Musik des Ostens. He also served a term as director of the Herder Institut für Musikgeschichte.
