= Belle Cole =

American opera singer (1845/53–1905)

Belle Cole (1845 or 1853–1905) was an American contralto opera singer.

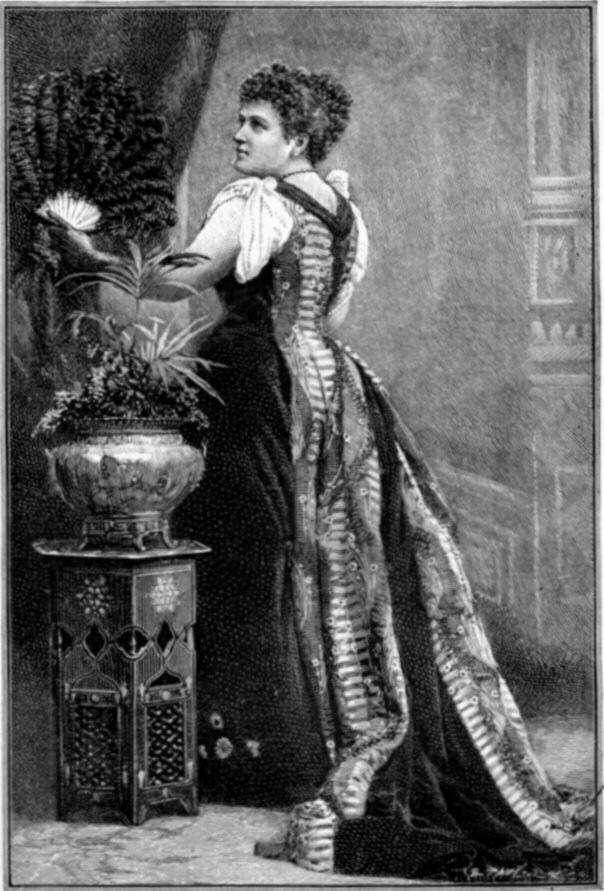
Belle Cole

Belle Cole was born Lucetta Belle Weaver to Philander Weaver and Mary Ruth Ann Harford, the ninth of eleven children. She was married to J. Calvin Cole. She first achieved success while on a transcontinental tour of the United States with Theodore Thomas in 1883. She later sang in England, performing at The Crystal Palace and many other venues. In 1901, she toured Australia with her Concert Company, which included Emily Spada (soprano), Philip Newbury (tenor), (Note: Newbury (1863–1936) was a New Zealand tenor, born in St Helier, Jersey. He married soprano Emily Spader, professionally known as Madame Emily Spada, in 1888.) Charles Magraith (bass), and Henrietta Murekens (violinist); and in 1894 she performed in several New Zealand cities.
