= Jessie Brown Pounds =

American poet

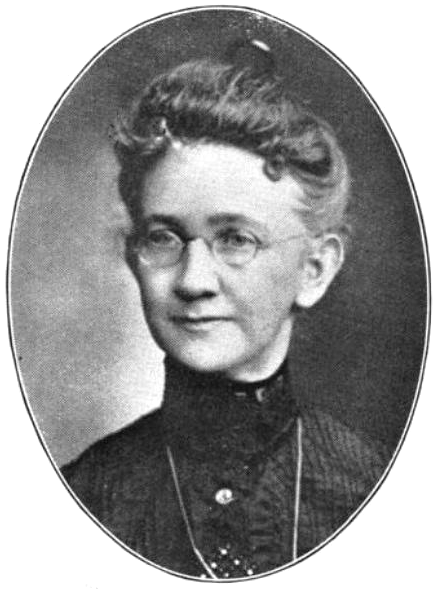
- Born: Jessie Hunter Brown; August 31, 1861; Hiram, Ohio
- Died: March 3, 1921 (aged 59); Hiram, Ohio
- Occupation: Writer
- Spouse: John E. Pounds (m. 1897)

Jessie Hunter Brown Pounds (August 31, 1861 – March 3, 1921) was an American lyricist of gospel songs.

== Life ==
Jessie Hunter Brown was born into a farm family in the village of Hiram, Portage County, Ohio. A staff writer for Christian Standard, she often collaborated with composer James Henry Fillmore, Sr. (1849–1936). In 1897 she married John E. Pounds, minister of the Central Christian Church in Indianapolis, IN.

As a college-educated, frontier woman, she's considered by some to be part of the "first generation" of "New Women."

She died at her home in Hiram on March 3, 1921.

=== Family ===
Her parents were Holland Brown and Jane Abel Brown. Holland Brown was baptized after hearing Walter Scott preach; and the couple were abolitionists. A notable guest of her parents was James A. Garfield.

== Works ==
"Her pen produced upwards of eight hundred hymns, eighty short stories, seven novels, lyrics, and scripts for cantatas, and numerous brief essays and non-fiction articles."

=== Hymns ===
"Anywhere with Jesus" is possibly the most well-known of her poems. Some of her poems have been set to a number of musical scores, the most familiar being the tune "Serenity" by Daniel B. Towner (1850–1919). Her 1896 poem "Beautiful Isle" became the song "Beautiful Isle of Somewhere", which was sung at President McKinley's funeral and criticized by President Wilson.

=== Articles ===
Jessie Pounds edited four journals affiliated with the Stone-Campbell Movement: Disciple of Christ, the Christian Standard, the Christian-Evangelist, and The Christian Century.

Jessie Pound wrote an article entitled, "The Passing of Prince Albert," the title referred to the "Prince Albert Coat" which she's argued symbolized professional preachers airs such as "pulpted tones," formal pious vocabulary, and "ministerial manners." These airs created barriers preventing pastors from connecting with congregations; she argues that while the lessening of professionalism has its dangers,"There should be not regret that the day of the clergy as a "third sex" is over."

=== Novels ===
She also wrote "Inspirational" novels such as Rachel Sylvestre (1904); these novels were often about Alexander Campbell's desire to live according to New Testament doctrine.

Her literary remodels were British author George Eliot [Mary Ann Evans], whom she frequently quotes, and Elizabeth Barrett Browning. Jessie even chooses a pen name "Auris Leigh" when writing for the Christian Evangelist inspired by Browning's popular feminist hero, Aurora.

Dr. Sandra Parker worked to reprint some of Pound's work because she believes her work belongs in the American literary canon; After the Western Reserve is a reprint of eleven short stories and the novel Rachel Sylvestre with and introduction by Parker who believes "Pounds' use of dialects, her description of village life, and the development of characters in a half-dozen fictional Ohio communities..."preserve a disappearing rural heritage and chronicle local issues," many of which reflect the powerful influences that the churches—Methodist, Baptist, and Disciples fellowships—had in their communities."
