= Ignace Gibsone =

English concert pianist and composer

Guillaume Ignace Gibsone (8 October 1826 - 9 June 1897) was an English concert pianist and composer, born in London of Scottish and French parentage. He lived and performed in Brussels during the 1840s.

== Selected works ==
- My Lady Sleeps (song, lyrics by Longfellow)
- Polonaise
- In the Fields
- The Elfin Knight (cantata, libretto by Fred. Enoch)
