= String Quartet (Chausson) =

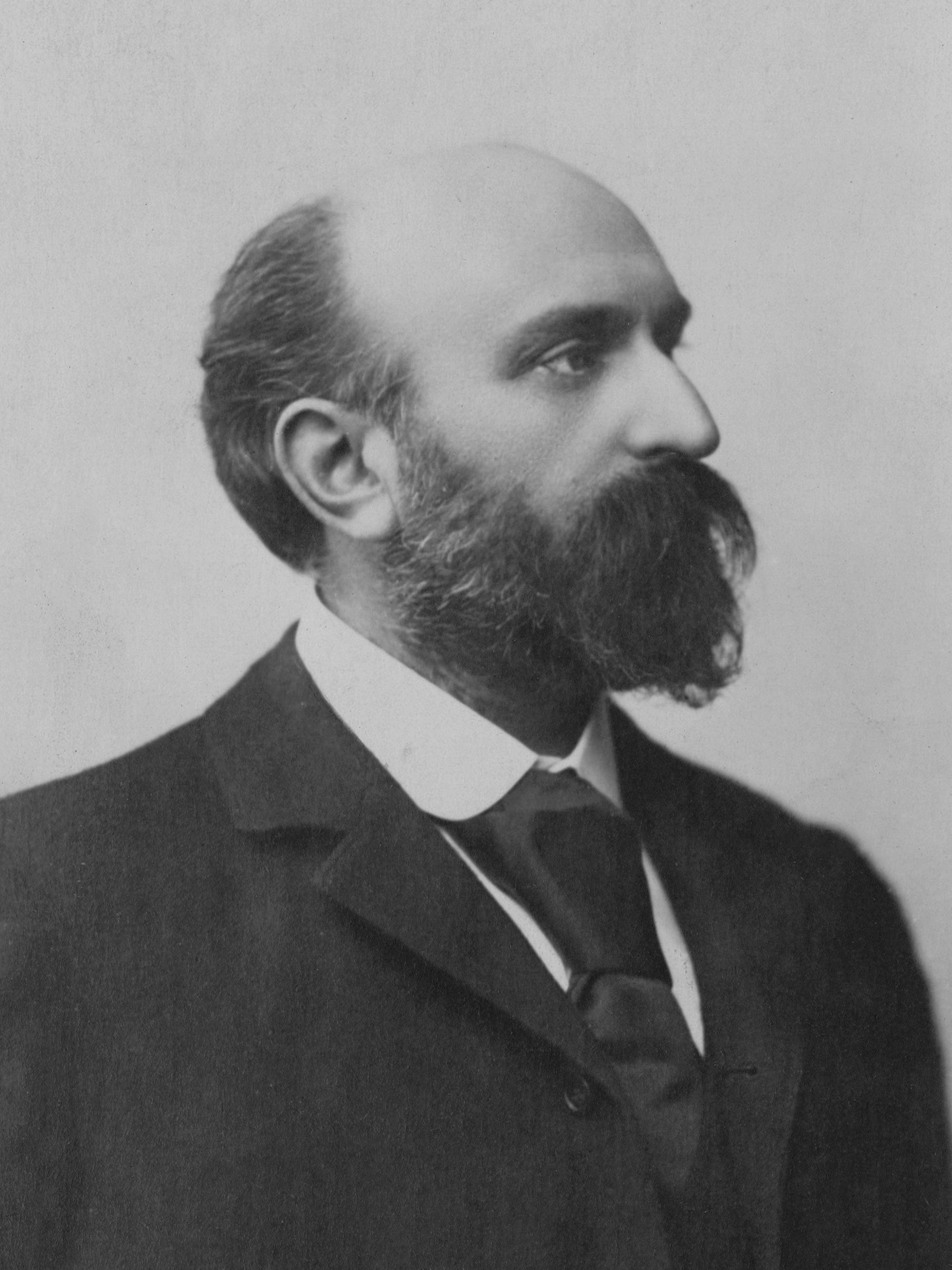
Ernest Chausson, photograph by Guy & Mockel, Paris, ca. 1897

The String Quartet in C minor, Op. 35, was begun by Ernest Chausson in 1898 and the composer had fully scored all but part of the third and last movement before he died in a bicycle accident on 10 June 1899. He was engaged on writing the last movement on the very day of his fatal accident.

Relying on the drafts left behind by Chausson, Vincent d'Indy completed the final movement at the request of the composer's family. The string quartet was premiered on 27 January 1900, at the Société Nationale de Musique (SNM). The performers were Armand Parent, Lammers, Denoyers and Baretti.

The work is believed to be influenced by the impressionism of Debussy and the first movement quotes his string quartet op. 10, while the second adopts the Tarnhelm theme from Wagner's opera Das Rheingold.

The three movements are:

1. Grave - Modéré
2. Très calme
3. Gaiement et pas trop vite
