= George Graham (monologist) =

English monologist and patent medicine salesman (1866–1903)

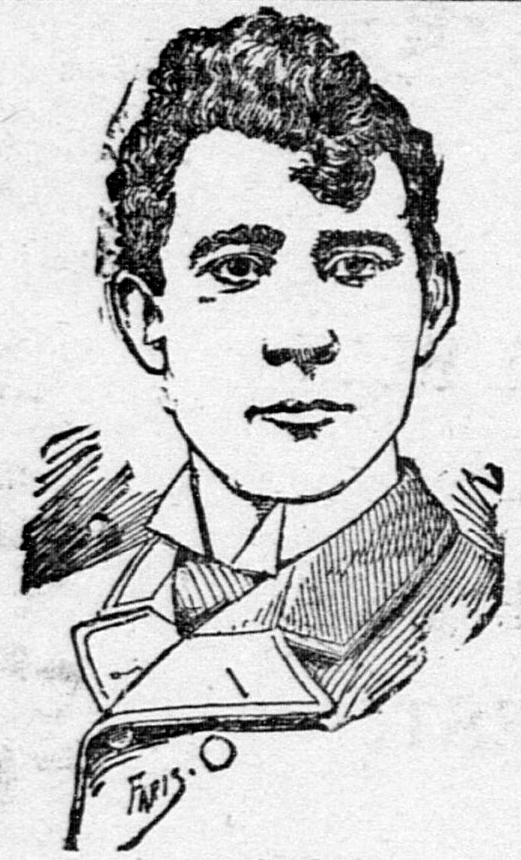
- Born: 1866; Alexandria, Virginia, US
- Died: November 10, 1903 (aged 36–37); Washington, D.C., US
- Occupations: Recording artist, Monologist
- Years active: 1890s–1900s

George W. Graham (1866 – November 10, 1903) was an American monologist, patent medicine salesman, and pioneer recording artist.

== Early life ==
Graham was born in Alexandria Virginia to George C. Graham (described in the 1880 census as a "huckster") and Mary E. Graham, an Irish immigrant. The family moved to Washington D.C. by 1880, where George Jr. would spend the rest of his life.

== Career ==
George entered show business by 1892, but throughout his career, supported himself by selling patent medicine. In his biography The Music Goes Round, Frederick Gaisberg, pianist and recordist for Berliner Gramophone, describes Graham as follows:

We averaged up by employing lower-paid local talent secured from the beergardens and street corners of Washington. One of these, George Graham, was a character of Washington life, a type of happy-go-lucky vagabond met with in the saloons, mostly near the free lunch counter, dodging the eyes of the bartender and cadging for drinks. He steered the easiest course through life, sometimes as a member of an Indian Medicine Troupe doing one-night stands in the spring and summer and in the winter selling quack medicines on the street corners. His tall, lanky figure, draped in a threadbare Prince Albert coat and adorned with a flowing tie, his wide-brimmed Stetson hat and his ready stream of wit combined to extract the dimes and nickels from his simple audience in exchange for a bottle of colored water. I discovered him one day on the corner of Seventh and Pennsylvania Avenue selling a liver cure to a crowd of spellbound negroes. He was assisted by John O'Terrell, who strummed the banjo and sang songs to draw the crowd.

Despite the freewheeling image suggested in Gaisberg's account, Graham was moderately successful on the vaudeville stage, though his common name makes it uncertain whether all entertainers advertised as "George Graham" refer to the same man.

Graham began recording for Emile Berliner's United States Gramophone Company in 1895, while it was still a small upstart based in Washington D.C. (home of the Columbia Phonograph Company, the industry's juggernaut at this time). Graham's repertoire ranged from vaudeville inspired comic routines like "Talk on Drinking" (Berliner 648, 0644) to poetry like Eugene Field's "Departure" (Berliner 646), but he is best known today for slice-of-life monologues like "Advertising Plant's Baking Powder" (Berliner 641), various imitations of a street fakir, or various imitations of an African-American preacher. This type of recording was popularized by W.O. Beckenbaugh in his "Auctioneer" series, and by Len Spencer and Russell Hunting in various imitations of side-show shouters, dime museum lecturers or betting bookies, and may have served to give rural listeners a taste of city life.

Graham continued recording for Victor, Columbia and Zonophone between 1900 and 1903, notably including the series "An Evening with the Minstrels" (Columbia cylinders 32045 A-L) with Len Spencer, Billy Golden, Vess Ossman and others. He died in 1903 under unknown circumstances.

== See also ==
- Len Spencer
- Russell Hunting
- David C. Bangs
