= W. F. Sherwin =

American composer an educator

William Fiske Sherwin (1826—1888) was an American composer and educator. He was born in Buckland, Massachusetts. At fifteen he was already a student of Lowell Mason. For a time, he taught Voice at New England Conservatory of Music. He was the music director of the Chautauqua Institution choir and a music director for two music publishing companies.
