= Edward Mack =

German-American composer (1826–1882)

Edward L. Mack (24 August 1826 – 7 January 1882), also credited as E. Mack, was a German born American composer, pianist, teacher, and piano professional best known for his prolific output of parlor pieces and military marches published chiefly in Philadelphia. His marches and patriotic pieces were widely circulated during and after the American Civil War, and numerous titles by Mack survive in major sheet music collections.

== Early life and education ==
Edward L. Mack was born on 24 August 1826 in Stuttgart, Baden Württemberg, Germany, and was baptized at the Evangelische Leonhardskirche on 3 September 1826. He emigrated to the United States with his parents in 1831, at about five years of age. In 1844, at approximately eighteen years old, Mack was admitted to the Pennsylvania Institution for the Instruction of the Blind in Philadelphia, where he received formal training that shaped his early musical formation.

== Career ==
By the 1850s Mack had established himself in Philadelphia as a pianist, music teacher, and composer. He wrote music aimed at the parlor market—marches, waltzes, and variations on popular melodies—designed to be both appealing and playable by amateur home pianists. His parlor arrangements included settings of familiar tunes such as "Annie Laurie" and "Home, Sweet Home," and he published extensively with Philadelphia firms, notably Lee & Walker.

During and after the American Civil War Mack composed numerous patriotic and military marches honoring Union leaders and public figures. His marches—titles associated with his output include pieces honoring McClellan, Grant, and Lincoln, were widely circulated and performed in civic and military contexts. He also wrote topical and novelty pieces reflecting contemporary interests, including bicycle themed works such as "The Velocipede Gallop" and "The Cyclopede Waltz."

== Output and Reception ==
Mack was a prolific publisher of sheet music. Hundreds of titles by Mack survive in public collections and score libraries, and his works, ranging from intimate parlor pieces to grand public marches, help illustrate the commercial sheet music market and popular musical tastes of mid 19th century America.

== Personal Life and Occupations ==
Mack lived in Philadelphia throughout his adult life and appears in federal census and directory records for the city across several decades. His recorded occupations include pupil (1850), teacher of music (1860), teacher (1870), piano dealer/tuner or repair man (1874), and pianist (1880). He married and had four children: Edward L. Mack Jr. (born c.1855), Lotti W. (born c.1857), Ema L. (born c.1858), and Sarah E. (born 1859).

== Death and Legacy ==
Mack died on 7 January 1882 in Philadelphia; the death record lists apoplexy (cerebral hemorrhage/stroke) as the cause. He was buried on 10 January 1882 at Odd Fellows Cemetery; his remains were later moved to Mount Peace or Lawnview. Mack’s extensive published output and strong representation in institutional collections make his music a valuable source for understanding popular musical tastes and the commercial sheet music market of his era.

== Selected Works ==
• General McClellan’s Grand March • General Grant’s Grand March • President Lincoln’s Funeral March • Variations on "Annie Laurie" • Arrangements of "Home, Sweet Home" • I'll Give to You a Paper of Pins • That Young Man Across the Way • The Velocipede Gallop • The Cyclopede Waltz
