= Harold Jarvis =

Canadian singer

Harold Jarvis (born 27 December 1864, Toronto; died 1 April 1924, Detroit) was a concert tenor who performed regularly in Canada and the United States, and who taught in Detroit during the 1890s. He began his professional life as a sailor, reaching the rank of officer with P&O and also served in the Royal Naval Reserve. He later studied music at the London Academy of Music. Professionally he was known for his teaching, his ballad singing, and performances in oratorios. He recorded for Victor in 1908 and 1911.
