= Louise Japha =

German musician

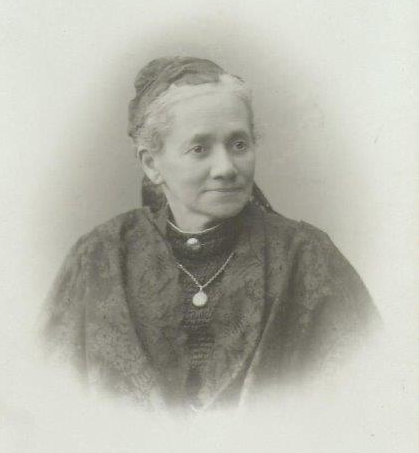
- Born: 2 February 1826; Hamburg, German Confederation
- Died: 13 October 1910 (aged 84); Wiesbaden, German Empire
- Occupations: Pianist, composer
- Spouse: Wilhelm Langhans (1858 – 1874)

Louise Japha (also Louise Langhans-Japha; 2 February 1826 – 13 October 1910) was a German pianist and composer.

== Life and work ==
Louise Japha grew up in Hamburg, where she learned to play the piano from Fritz Warendorf and composition from Georg August Groß and Friedrich Wilhelm Grund. Her first concert was on 10 February 1838 in the local Apollo Hall. To practice the piano she went to the piano factory of Baumgarten und Heins, where she met the young Johannes Brahms. They practised and played together and discussed his first compositions. A long-lasting friendly relationship developed between Louise Japha and Brahms, who was seven years younger than her. Brahms dedicated one of his earliest works (Op. 6, six songs) to Louise and her sister Minna to express his gratitude.

At the invitation of Clara Schumann, Louise Japha moved to Düsseldorf with her sister in 1853 to complete her musical studies with the Schumanns. There she met Johannes Brahms again.

In 1858, Louise Japha married the composer and music writer Wilhelm Langhans; they performed together. In particular, she was a celebrated pianist in Paris from 1863 to 1869. In 1868, she performed at the premiere of Brahms' Piano Quintet in F minor, Op. 34. Franz Liszt dedicated his Beethoven Cantata No. 1 (Celebratory cantata for the unveiling of the Beethoven monument in Bonn, 1845) to her. She worked in association with Stephen Heller, François-Auguste Gevaert, Camille Saint-Saëns, César Franck, and Gioachino Rossini. In 1874, her marriage with Wilhelm Langhans ended in divorce. She settled in Wiesbaden that year.

Japha wrote an opera, and composed string quartets, piano pieces, and songs - but not all her works were published.

== Sources ==
- Wilson, Lyle G. (1985). A Dictionary of Pianists. London: Robert Hale.
- Cohen, Aaron I. (1981). International Encyclopedia of Women Composers. New York: R. R. Bowker.
- Robijns, Jozef; Zijlstra, Miep (1979). Algemene muziek enciclopedie ("General music encyclopedia"). Haarlem: De Haan.
- Frank, Paul; Altmann, Wilhelm (1936). Kurzgefasstes Tonkünstler Lexikon: für Musiker und Freunde der Musik [Succinct lexicon of musicians: for musicians and lovers of music] (in German). Regensburg: Gustav Bosse Verlag.
- Elson, Arthur (1903). Woman's Work in Music. Boston: L. C. Page.
- Baker, Theodore (1900). Biographical dictionary of musicians. New York: G. Schirmer.
- Brown, James Duff (1900). Biographical dictionary of musicians. Paisley, Scotland: A. Gardner.
- Sittard, Josef (1890). Geschichte des Musik- und Concertwesens in Hamburg. Vom 14. Jahrhundert bis auf die Gegenwart. Altona: A. C. Rehor.
- Hubert Kolland (1982). "Langhans, Wilhelm". Neue Deutsche Biographie (in German). Vol. 13. Berlin: Duncker & Humblot. pp. 603–604. (full text online).
