= Paul Sarebresole =

American ragtime composer of French descent (1875–1911)

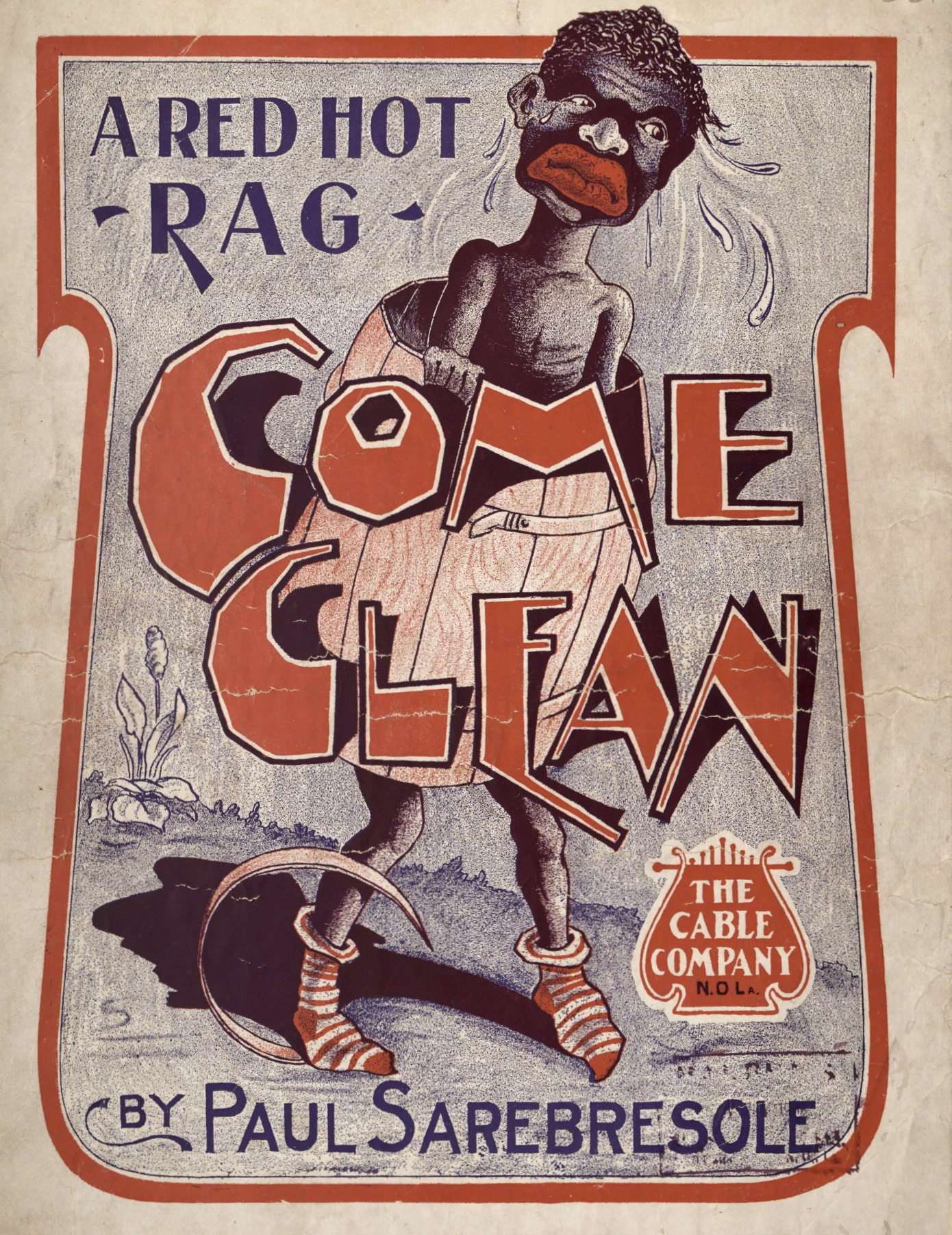
Cover of sheet music "Come Clean" "A Red Hot Rag" by Paul Sarebresole, published by the Cable Company, New Orleans. Cartoon artwork depicts stereotyped African American man wearing a barrel and stockings.

Paul Sarebresole (May 1875 - October 3, 1911) was an early composer of ragtime music.

Sarebresole was born in New Orleans, Louisiana. His French ancestors spelled the family name "Sarrebresolles".

His "Roustabout Rag", published in 1897 by Gruenewald, was one of the earliest published ragtime pieces. It utilized the "three-over-four" rhythm later popularized by Charles L. Johnson.

Other noted Sarebresole compositions include "Get Your Habits On" from 1898 (which inspired the more popular sequel, "I've Got my Habits On"), "Fire's Out" from 1902, and "Come Clean" in 1905.

Paul Sarebresole died at 1357 St Anthony Street in New Orleans at the age of 36 and was buried in St. Louis Cemetery Number 3.

== See also ==
- List of ragtime composers
