= Ignacy Krzyżanowski =

Polish composer

- Born: December 24, 1826; Opatów
- Died: February 10, 1905 (aged 78)
- Occupation: Composer

Ignacy Krzyżanowski (December 24, 1826 – February 10, 1905) was a Polish composer.

== Biography ==
Krzyżanowski was born on December 24, 1826 in Opatów. He studied in Kraków with Franciszek Mirecki and later at Conservatoire de Paris with Hippolyte-Raymond Colet.
