= Dinah Shore discography =

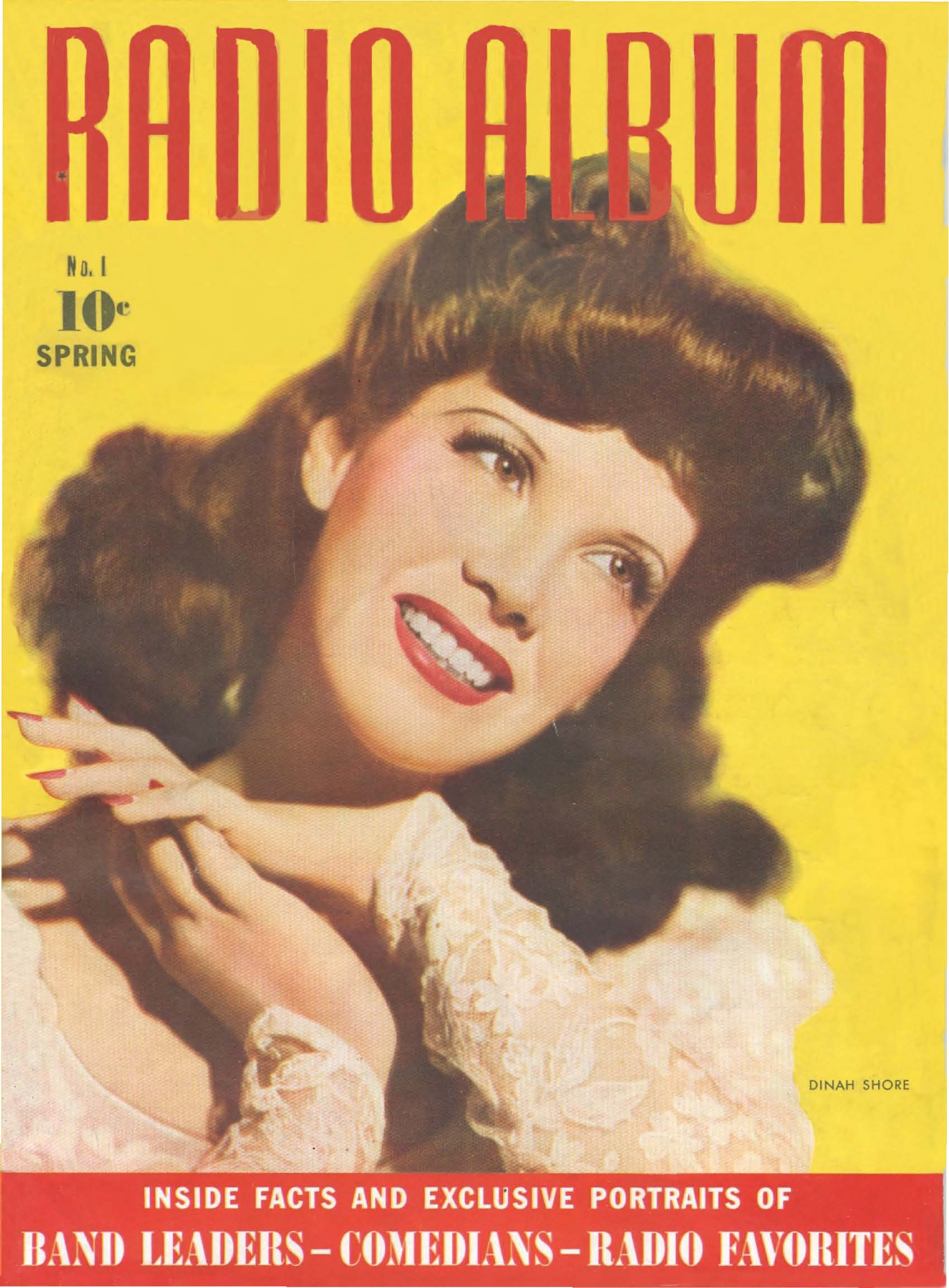
Shore on a magazine cover, 1942

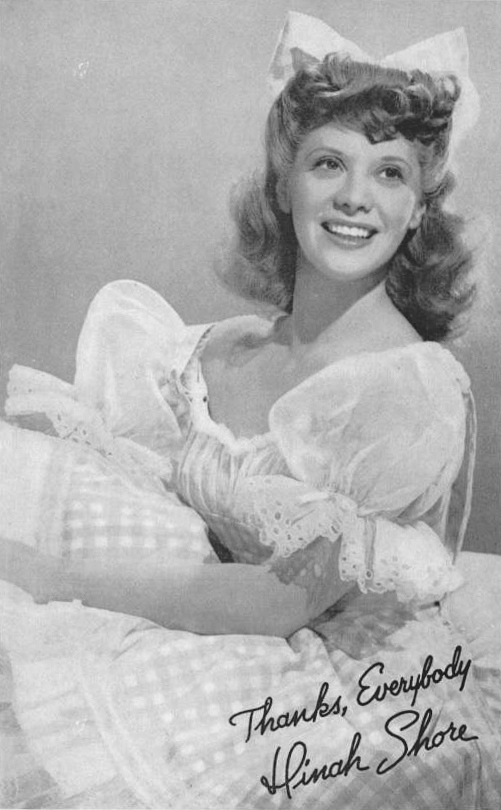
Shore in Billboard, 1943

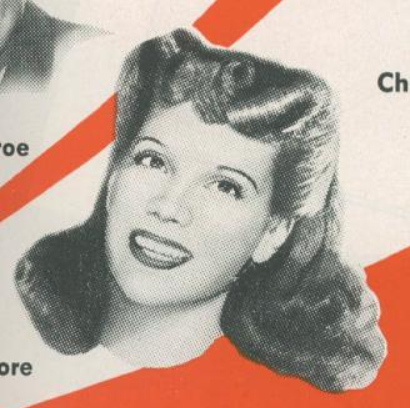
Shore in Billboard, 1944

Dinah Shore was an American singer and actress. Her discography comprises around 200 singles and many studio albums.

== Albums ==
- NBC's Chamber Music Society of Lower Basin Street (1941, RCA Victor Records 78 Set P-56 three-record set)
- Musical Orchids (1943, RCA Victor Records 78 rpm four-record set)
- Gershwin Show Hits (1945, RCA Victor Records 78 rpm three-record set)
- Reminiscing with Dinah Shore (1947, Columbia 78 rpm four-record set)
- Bongo from Walt Disney (1947, Columbia Records 78 rpm three-record set)
- A Date with Dinah (1948, Columbia Records 78 rpm four-record set)
- The Blue Velvet Voice of Dinah Shore (1948, Victor 78 rpm five-record set)
- Dinah Shore Sings (1949, Columbia 10-inch)
- Reminiscing with Dinah Shore (1949, Columbia 10-inch)
- Torch Songs (1950, Columbia Set D-1 10-inch)
- Dinah Shore & Sidney Bechet ~ Lower Basin Street (1950, RCA Victor 78 Set P-56 four-record set)
- The King and I (1951, RCA Victor 10-inch)
- Dinah Shore ~ Lower Basin Street Volume 2 (1951, RCA Victor 78 rpm four-record set)
- Dinah Shore Sings the Blues (1953, RCA Victor 10-inch)
- Call Me Madam Original Cast (1953, RCA Victor 10-inch)
- The Dinah Shore TV Show (1954, RCA 10", 1955, RCA Victor 12-inch)
- Holding Hands at Midnight (1955, RCA Victor)
- Bouquet of Blues (1956, RCA Victor)
- Call Me Madam Original Cast (1956, RCA Victor)
- Dinah Shore Sings Porter and Rodgers (1957, Harmony)
- Love Songs (1958, Harmony)
- General Motors 50th Anniversary Show (1958, RCA Victor)
- Moments Like These (1958, RCA Victor)
- Dinah, Yes Indeed! (1959, Capitol)
- Lower Basin Street (1959, RCA Camden)
- I'm Your Girl (1959, RCA Camden)
- Lavender Blue (1959, Harmony)
- Somebody Loves Me (1959, Capitol)
- Dinah Sings Some Blues with Red (1960, Capitol)
- Vivacious (1960, RCA Camden)
- Buttons and Bows (1960, Harmony)
- Dinah Sings, Previn Plays (1961, Capitol)
- Dinah Down Home! (1962, Capitol)
- The Fabulous Hits of Dinah Shore (1962, Capitol)
- My Very Best to You (1963, Capitol)
- Lower Basin Street Revisited (1965, Reprise)
- Songs for Sometime Losers (1967, Project 3)
- Country Feelin' (1969, Decca)
- Once Upon A Summertime (1975, Stanyan)
- Dinah! (1976, Capitol)
- Dinah!: I've Got a Song (1979, CTW/Sesame Street)

== Singles ==
| Year | Single (A-side, B-side) Both sides from same album except where indicated | Chart positions | | Album |
| Year | Single (A-side, B-side) Both sides from same album except where indicated | US | US R&B | Album |
|---|---|---|---|---|
| 1939 | "Who Told You I Cared" b/w "I Like to Recognize the Tune" | — | — | Non-album tracks |
| 1939 | "I Thought About You" b/w "Last Night" | — | — | Non-album tracks |
| 1939 | "Careless" b/w "Darn That Dream" | — | — | Non-album tracks |
| 1939 | "Watching the Clock" b/w "I've Got My Eyes on You" | — | — | Non-album tracks |
| 1940 | "Shake Down the Stars" b/w "Imagination" | — | — | Non-album tracks |
| 1940 | "Say It" b/w "Just A-Whistlin' and A-Whittlin'" | — | — | Non-album tracks |
| 1940 | "The Breeze and I" b/w "When the Swallows Come Back to Capistrano"; Both sides with Xavier Cugat | 13 | — | Cugie! |
| 1940 | "You Can't Brush Me Off" b/w "Outside of That, I Love You"; Both sides with Dick Todd | 24 | — | Non-album tracks |
| 1940 | "Whatever Happened to You?" (with Xavier Cugat) | 22 | — | Cugie! |
| 1940 | "The Rumba-Cardi" (with Xavier Cugat) | 19 | — | Cugie! |
| 1940 | "Maybe" b/w "The Nearness of You" | 17 | — | Non-album tracks |
| 1940 | "Smoke Gets In Your Eyes" b/w "How Come You Like Me Like You Do" | — | — | Musical Orchids (10-inch LP) |
| 1940 | "Yes, My Darling Daughter" b/w "Down Argentina Way" | 10 | — | Non-album tracks |
| 1941 | "Mood Indigo" | — | — | Non-album tracks |
| 1941 | "Dinah's Blues" | — | — | Non-album tracks |
| 1941 | "My Man" b/w "Somebody Loves Me" | 23 | — | Musical Orchids (10-inch LP) |
| 1941 | "Somewhere" b/w "Memphis Blues" (from Musical Orchids 10-inch LP) | — | — | Non-album tracks |
| 1941 | "I Hear a Rhapsody" | 9 | — | Non-album tracks |
| 1941 | "I Do, Do You?" | 22 | — | Non-album tracks |
| 1941 | "For All Time" b/w "#10 Lullaby Lane" | — | — | Non-album tracks |
| 1941 | "Where Are You" b/w "Mockingbird Lament" | — | — | Non-album tracks |
| 1941 | "Do You Care?" b/w "Honeysuckle Rose" (from Musical Orchids 10-inch LP) | 21 | — | Non-album tracks |
| 1941 | "Quiéreme Mucho" (with Xavier Cugat) | 16 | — | Non-album tracks |
| 1941 | "Jim" b/w "I'm Through with Love" | 5 | — | Non-album tracks |
| 1942 | "You and I" b/w "On a Bicycle Built for Two" | — | — | Non-album tracks |
| 1942 | "Love Me or Leave Me" b/w "All Alone" | — | — | Non-album tracks |
| 1942 | "Somebody Nobody Loves" b/w "If It's You" | — | — | Non-album tracks |
| 1942 | "Miss You" b/w "Is It Taboo (To Fall In Love with You)" | 8 | — | Non-album tracks |
| 1942 | "I Got It Bad (and That Ain't Good)" b/w "This Is No Laughing Matter" (Non-album track) | 19 | — | Dinah Shore Sings the Blues (10-inch LP) |
| 1942 | "Don't Leave Me" b/w "As We Walk Into the Sunset" | — | — | Non-album tracks |
| 1942 | "Everything I Love" b/w "Happy In Love" | — | — | Non-album tracks |
| 1942 | "I Don't Want to Walk Without You" b/w "Fooled" | 12 | — | Non-album tracks |
| 1942 | "Blues in the Night" b/w "Sometimes" (Non-album track) | 4 | — | Musical Orchids (10-inch LP) |
| 1942 | "Goodnight, Captain Curly-Head" | 23 | — | Non-album tracks |
| 1942 | "Skylark" | 5 | — | Non-album tracks |
| 1942 | "I Look at Heaven When I Look at You" b/w "I Can't Give You Anything But Love" | — | — | Non-album tracks |
| 1942 | "Not Mine" b/w "She'll Always Remember" | — | — | Non-album tracks |
| 1942 | "He Wears a Pair of Silver Wings" b/w "Conchita, Marcheta, Lolita, Pepita, Rosita" | 16 | — | Non-album tracks |
| 1942 | "Mad About Him" b/w "Be Careful, It's My Heart" (Non-album track) | 18 | — | Musical Orchids (10-inch LP) |
| 1942 | "Body and Soul" b/w "Sophisticated Lady" | — | — | Non-album tracks |
| 1942 | "Sleepy Lagoon" b/w "Three Little Sisters" | 12 | — | Non-album tracks |
| 1942 | "One Dozen Roses" b/w "All I Need Is You" | 8 | — | Non-album tracks |
| 1942 | "Stardust" | — | — | Non-album tracks |
| 1942 | "He's My Guy" b/w "A Boy In Khaki, A Girl In Lace" | 20 | — | Non-album tracks |
| 1942 | "Dearly Beloved" | 10 | — | Non-album tracks |
| 1943 | "Why Don't You Fall In Love with Me?" | 3 | — | Non-album tracks |
| 1943 | "You'd Be So Nice to Come Home To" b/w "Manhattan Serenade" | 3 | 10 | Non-album tracks |
| 1943 | "Murder He Says" | 5 | — | Non-album tracks |
| 1943 | "Something to Remember You By" | 18 | — | Non-album tracks |
| 1944 | "Now I Know" b/w "I Couldn't Sleep a Wink Last Night" (Non-album track) | — | — | Moments Like These |
| 1944 | "I'll Walk Alone" b/w "It Could Happen to You" | 1 | 10 | Non-album tracks |
| 1944 | "Together" b/w "I Learned a Lesson I'll Never Forget" | 19 | — | Non-album tracks |
| 1945 | "Auld Lang Syne" b/w "I Can't Tell You Why I Love You" | — | — | Non-album tracks |
| 1945 | "Sleigh Ride In July" b/w "Like Someone in Love" | 8 | — | Non-album tracks |
| 1945 | "Candy" | 5 | — | Non-album tracks |
| 1945 | "He's Home For a Little While" | 11 | — | Non-album tracks |
| 1945 | "I Guess I'll Hang My Tears Out to Dry" b/w "Let's Take the Long Way Home" | — | — | Non-album tracks |
| 1945 | "The Man I Love" b/w "Do It Again" | — | — | Non-album tracks |
| 1945 | "Someone to Watch Over Me" b/w "Love Walked In" | — | — | Non-album tracks |
| 1945 | "Along the Navajo Trail" b/w "Counting the Days" | — | — | Non-album tracks |
| 1945 | "I Fall In Love Too Easily" b/w "Can't You Read Between the Lines" | — | — | Non-album tracks |
| 1945 | "But I Did" b/w "As Long As I Live" | 16 | — | Non-album tracks |
| 1945 | "My Guy's Come Back" b/w "Honey" | 14 | — | Non-album tracks |
| 1945 | "Pass Me That Peace Pipe" b/w "Everybody Knew But Me" | — | — | Non-album tracks |
| 1946 | "Personality" b/w "Welcome to My Dream" | 10 | — | Non-album tracks |
| 1946 | "Everybody Knew But Me" b/w "I Can't Believe That You're in Love with Me" | — | — | Non-album tracks |
| 1946 | "Shoo-Fly Pie and Apple Pan Dowdy" b/w "Here I Go Again" (Non-album track) | 6 | — | Buttons and Bows |
| 1946 | "Where Did You Learn to Love" b/w "Coax Me a Little Bit" (from The Girl Friends) | — | — | Non-album track |
| 1946 | "Laughing on the Outside (Crying on the Inside)" | 3 | — | Lavender Blue |
| 1946 | "The Gypsy" | 1 | — | Dinah Shore Sings (10-inch LP) |
| 1946 | "All That Glitters Is Not Gold" b/w "Come Rain or Come Shine" (from Lavender Blue) | 9 | — | Non-album tracks |
| 1946 | "Doin' What Comes Natur'lly" b/w "I Got Lost in His Arms" (Non-album track) | 3 | — | Buttons and Bows |
| 1946 | "Two Silhouettes" b/w "That Little Dream Got Nowhere" | — | — | Non-album tracks |
| 1946 | "You Keep Coming Back Like a Song" b/w "The Way That the Wind Blows" | 5 | — | Non-album tracks |
| 1946 | "I'll Never Love Again" b/w "You, So It's You" | — | — | Non-album tracks |
| 1946 | "Who'll Buy My Violets" b/w "I May Be Wrong But I Think You're Wonderful" (from Reminiscing With Dinah Shore 10-inch LP) | — | — | Non-album tracks |
| 1946 | "Remember" b/w "White Christmas" | — | — | Non-album tracks |
| 1947 | "A Rainy Night In Rio" b/w "Through a Thousand Dreams" | — | — | Non-album tracks |
| 1947 | "(I Love You) For Sentimental Reasons" b/w "You'll Always Be the One I Love" (Non-album track) | 2 | — | Buttons and Bows |
| 1947 | "And So to Bed" b/w "Sooner or Later" | — | — | Non-album tracks |
| 1947 | "My Bel Ami" b/w "I'll Close My Eyes" | — | — | Non-album tracks |
| 1947 | "The Anniversary Song" b/w "Heartaches, Sadness and Tears" | 1 | — | Non-album tracks |
| 1947 | "Dixie" b/w "I've Got You Under My Skin" | — | — | A Date with Dinah (10-inch LP) |
| 1947 | "Can't Help Lovin' Dat Man of Mine" b/w "Kerry Dance" | — | — | A Date with Dinah (10-inch LP) |
| 1947 | "After I Say I'm Sorry" b/w "The Thrill Is Gone" | — | — | A Date with Dinah (10-inch LP) |
| 1947 | "There'll Be Some Changes Made" b/w "They Didn't Believe Me" | — | — | A Date with Dinah (10-inch LP) |
| 1947 | "The Egg and I" b/w "Who Cares What People Say" | 16 | — | Non-album tracks |
| 1947 | "When Am I Gonna Kiss You Good Morning?" b/w "Mama Do I Gotta" | 23 | — | Non-album tracks |
| 1947 | "Ask Anyone Who Knows" b/w "Papa Don't Preach To Me" (from Buttons and Bows) | — | — | Non-album tracks |
| 1947 | "Tallahassee" b/w "Natch"; Both sides with Woody Herman | 15 | — | Non-album tracks |
| 1947 | "I Wish I Didn't Love You So" b/w "I'm So Right Tonight" (Non-album track) | 2 | — | Love Songs Sung By Dinah Shore |
| 1947 | "You Do" b/w "Kokomo, Indiana" | 4 | — | Non-album tracks |
| 1947 | "It Takes a Long, Long Train with a Red Caboose" b/w "Do a Little Business On the Side" | 23 | — | Non-album tracks |
| 1947 | "Golden Earrings" b/w "The Gentleman Is a Dope" (from Dinah Shore Sings Cole Porter and Richard Rodgers) | 25 | — | Lavender Blue |
| 1947 | "How Soon (Will I Be Seeing You)" b/w "Fool That I Am" | 8 | — | Non-album tracks |
| 1947 | "In a Little Book Shop" b/w "I'll Always Be in Love with You" | — | — | Non-album tracks |
| 1947 | "At the Candlelight Cafe" | 24 | — | Non-album tracks |
| 1948 | "The Best Things In Life Are Free" | 18 | — | Non-album tracks |
| 1948 | "What's Good About Goodbye" b/w "Hooray for Love" | — | — | Non-album tracks |
| 1948 | "Little White Lies" b/w "Crying for Joy" (Non-album track) | 11 | — | Reminiscing with Dinah Shore (10-inch LP) |
| 1948 | "It Was Written in the Stars" b/w "My Guitar" | — | — | Non-album tracks |
| 1948 | "Better Luck Next Time" b/w "Steppin' Out with My Baby" | — | — | Non-album tracks |
| 1948 | "I'll Be Seeing You" b/w "I Get Along Without You Very Well" | — | — | Reminiscing with Dinah Shore (10-inch LP) |
| 1948 | "May I Still Hold You" b/w "Baby Don't Be Mad at Me" | — | — | Non-album tracks |
| 1948 | "Just One of Those Things" b/w "Mad About the Boy" | — | — | S'Wonderful (10-inch LP) |
| 1948 | "S'Wonderful" b/w "Let's Do It" | — | — | S'Wonderful (10-inch LP) |
| 1948 | "Easy to Love" b/w "Summertime" | — | — | S'Wonderful (10-inch LP) |
| 1948 | "This Is The Moment" b/w "Love That Boy" | — | — | Non-album tracks |
| 1948 | "Buttons and Bows" b/w "Daddy-O" (Non-album track) | 1 | — | Buttons and Bows |
| 1948 | "What Did I Do" b/w "The Matador" | — | — | Non-album tracks |
| 1948 | "Lavender Blue (Dilly Dilly)" b/w "So Dear To My Heart" (Non-album track) | 9 | — | Lavender Blue |
| 1949 | "Far Away Places" b/w Say It Every Day" (Non-album track) | 14 | — | Buttons and Bows |
| 1949 | "Tara Talara Tala" b/w "A Rosewood Spinet" | — | — | Non-album tracks |
| 1949 | "So in Love" b/w "Always True to You in My Fashion" | 20 | — | Dinah Shore Sings Cole Porter and Richard Rodgers |
| 1949 | "Forever and Ever" b/w "I've Been Hit" (Non-album track) | 12 | — | Lavender Blue |
| 1949 | "Story of My Life" b/w "Having a Wonderful Time" | — | — | Non-album tracks |
| 1949 | "A Wonderful Guy" b/w "Younger Than Springtime" | 22 | — | Dinah Shore Sings Cole Porter and Richard Rodgers |
| 1949 | "Baby, It's Cold Outside" b/w "My One and Only Highland Fling"; Both sides with Buddy Clark | 4 | — | Non-album tracks |
| 1949 | "I'm Gonna Wash That Man Right Out of My Hair" b/w "Kiss Me Sweet" (Non-album track) | — | — | Dinah Shore Sings Cole Porter and Richard Rodgers |
| 1949 | "Dear Hearts and Gentle People" b/w "Speak A Word Of Love" (Non-album track) | 2 | — | Buttons and Bows |
| 1950 | "Bibbidi-Bobbidi-Boo" b/w "Happy Times" | 25 | — | Non-album tracks |
| 1950 | "It's So Nice to Have a Man Around the House" b/w "More Than Anything Else In the World" (Non-album track) | 20 | — | Buttons and Bows |
| 1950 | "Can Anyone Explain? (No! No! No!)" b/w "Dream a Little Dream of Me" (from Love Songs Sung By Dinah Shore) | 29 | — | Non-album tracks |
| 1950 | "My Heart Cries for You" | 3 | — | Non-album tracks |
| 1950 | "Nobody's Chasing Me" | 18 | — | Non-album tracks |
| 1950 | "Marrying For Love" (with Paul Lucas) b/w "The Best Thing For You" | — | — | Call Me Madam original show album |
| 1951 | "Wait For Me" b/w "Down In Nashville, Tennessee" | — | — | Non-album tracks |
| 1951 | "A Penny a Kiss" (with Tony Martin) | 8 | — | Non-album tracks |
| 1951 | "In Your Arms" (with Tony Martin) | 24 | — | Non-album tracks |
| 1951 | "I'm Through with Love" b/w "Makin' Whoopee" | — | — | Non-album tracks |
| 1951 | "Orchids In the Moonlight" b/w "Around the Corner" | — | — | Non-album tracks |
| 1951 | "I Wonder Where My Baby Is Tonight" b/w "My Isle Of Golden Dreams" | — | — | Non-album tracks |
| 1951 | "Lonesome Gal" b/w "Too Late Now" (from I'm Your Girl) | — | — | Bouquet of Blues |
| 1951 | "You're Just in Love"; B-side unknown | 29 | — | Call Me Madam original show album |
| 1951 | "The Three Cornered Tune" b/w "'Cause I Love You" (Non-album track) | — | — | I'm Your Girl |
| 1951 | "Sweet Violets" b/w "If You Turn Me Down" (Non-album track) | 3 | — | The Best of Dinah Shore |
| 1951 | "Ten Thousand Miles" b/w "How Many Times" (Non-album track) | — | — | I'm Your Girl |
| 1951 | "The Musicians" b/w "How D'Ye Do and Shake Hands"; Both sides with Tony Martin, Betty Hutton & Phil Harris | 18 | — | Non-album tracks |
| 1951 | "It's All In the Game" b/w "Stay Awhile" (Non-album track) | — | — | I'm Your Girl |
| 1951 | "Manhattan" (with Tony Martin) | — | — | Non-album tracks |
| 1951 | "Getting to Know You" b/w "The End of a Love Affair" (from I'm Your Girl) | — | — | Non-album tracks |
| 1951 | "The Lie-De-Lie Song" b/w "Oh, How I Needed You Joe" | — | — | Non-album tracks |
| 1951 | "If You Catch a Little Cold" b/w "Manhattan"; Both sides with Tony Martin | — | — | Non-album tracks |
| 1952 | "Saturday Night at Punkin Crick" b/w "Life Is a Beautiful Thing" | — | — | Aaron Slick From Punkin Crick (10-inch LP) |
| 1952 | "Until" b/w "Take Me Home" | — | — | Non-album tracks |
| 1952 | "Double Shuffle" b/w "Senator From Tennessee"; Both sides with Tex Williams | — | — | Non-album tracks |
| 1952 | "Delicado" b/w "The World Has a Promise" | 28 | — | Non-album tracks |
| 1952 | "Blues In Advance" b/w "Bella Musica" (Non-album track) | 20 | — | I'm Your Girl |
| 1952 | "Keep It a Secret" b/w "Hi-Lili, Hi-Lo" | — | — | Non-album tracks |
| 1953 | "Salomee (With Her Seven Veils)" b/w "Let Me Know" | 22 | — | Non-album tracks |
| 1953 | "Sweet Thing" b/w "Why Come Crying to Me" | 27 | — | Non-album tracks |
| 1953 | "Blue Canary" b/w "Eternally" (from I'm Your Girl) | 11 | — | The Best of Dinah Shore |
| 1954 | "Changing Partners" b/w "Think" | 12 | — | Non-album tracks |
| 1954 | "Pass The Jam, Sam" b/w "I'll Hate Myself In The Morning" | 28 | — | Non-album tracks |
| 1954 | "Come Back to My Arms" b/w "This Must Be the Place" | — | — | Non-album tracks |
| 1954 | "If I Give My Heart to You" b/w "Tempting" | 28 | — | Non-album tracks |
| 1954 | "Never Underestimate" b/w "I Have to Tell You" | — | — | Non-album tracks |
| 1954 | "Melody of Love" b/w "You're Getting to Be a Habit with Me"; Both sides with Tony Martin | — | — | Non-album tracks |
| 1955 | "Whatever Lola Wants (Lola Gets)" b/w "Church Twice On Sunday" | 12 | — | Non-album tracks |
| 1955 | "Love and Marriage" b/w "Compare" | 20 | — | Non-album tracks |
| 1956 | "Stolen Love" b/w "That's All There Is to That" | 73 | — | Non-album tracks |
| 1956 | "I Could Have Danced All Night" b/w "What a Heavenly Night For Love" | 93 | — | Non-album tracks |
| 1957 | "Chantez-Chantez" b/w "Honky Tonk Heart" | 19 | — | The Best of Dinah Shore |
| 1957 | "The Cattle Call" b/w "Promises Promises" | 92 | — | Non-album tracks |
| 1957 | "Fascination" b/w "Till" | 15 | — | Non-album tracks |
| 1957 | "I'll Never Say Never Again Again" b/w "The Kiss That Rocked the World" (Non-album track) | 24 | — | Vivacious |
| 1958 | "Thirteen Men" b/w "I've Never Left Your Arms" | — | — | Non-album tracks |
| 1958 | "The Secret of Happiness" b/w "It's the Second Time You Meet That Matters" | — | — | Non-album tracks |
| 1958 | "Scene of the Crime" b/w "I'm Sitting on Top of the World" | — | — | Non-album tracks |
| 1960 | "When The Sparrows Learn to Fly" b/w "So Many Things to Do Today" | — | — | Non-album tracks |
| 1960 | "I Ain't Down Yet" b/w "I Gotta Love You" (Non-album track) | 103 | — | The Fabulous Hits of Dinah Shore |
| 1961 | "This Is a Changing World" b/w "Mississippi Mud" (from Dinah, Down Home) | — | — | Non-album tracks |
| 1962 | "That'll Show Him!" b/w "Just a Brief Encounter" | — | — | Non-album tracks |
| 1969 | "Crying Time" b/w "Rocky Top" | — | — | Country Feelin' |
| 1974 | "Me and Ole Crazy Bill" b/w "Wait a Little Longer" | — | — | Non-album tracks |
