= It's Funny to Everyone but Me =

1939 song written by Jack Lawrence

"It's Funny to Everyone but Me" is a song with words and music written by Jack Lawrence in 1939. It was recorded by the Ink Spots on May 17, 1939.

This song should not be confused with another of the same title written by Isham Jones in 1934, with lyrics by Dave Franklin. Jones recorded it with his orchestra in 1934 but it was not successful.

== Notable recordings ==
It was also recorded by Frank Sinatra with Harry James and his Orchestra on August 17, 1939. It was one of the songs of Sinatra's developing repertoire. Sinatra's version was reissued in 1944 and it reached No. 21 on Billboard charts.

In 1960, Dinah Shore included it on her album Dinah Sings Some Blues with Red.

In 2017, Bob Dylan released a version of the song on his album Triplicate.

== Copyright ==
This song had its copyright renewed, so it will enter the American public domain on January 1, 2035.
