= Call for Music =

1948 old-time radio program

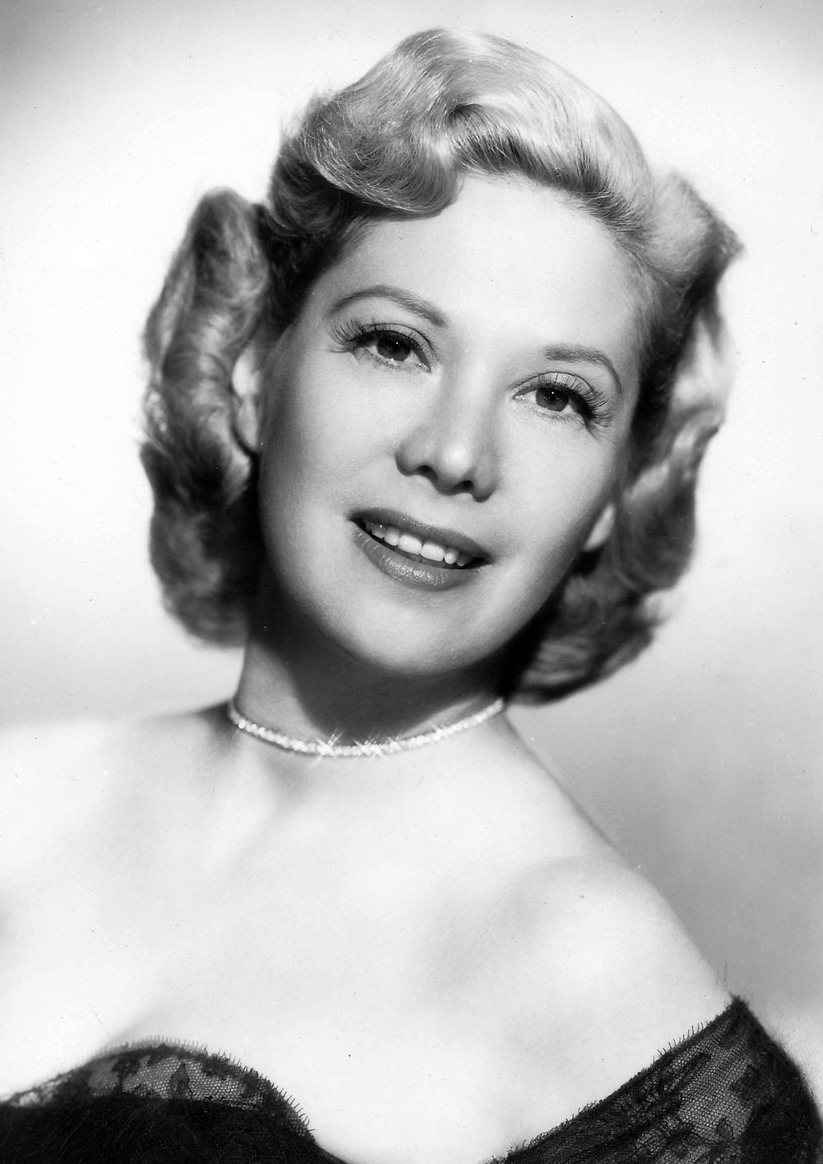
- Dinah Shore
- Genre: Variety
- Running time: 30 minutes
- Country of origin: United States
- Language: English
- Syndicates: CBS; NBC
- Starring: Dinah Shore
- Announcer: Jack Rourke (CBS); John Holbrook (NBC)
- Written by: Jerry Lawrence; Robert Lee; Robert Smith
- Directed by: Jerry Lawrence; Robert Lee; Bill Brennan
- Original release: February 13 – June 29, 1948
- Opening theme: On the Trail
- Sponsored by: Philip Morris

Call for Music is an old-time radio program in the United States. It was broadcast on CBS February 13 – April 16, 1948, and on NBC April 20 – June 29, 1948. The title was adapted from the sponsor's signature radio tag, "Call for Philip Morris."

== Personnel ==
Dinah Shore starred in the program, which featured a guest star each week. Other regulars on the show were singer/songwriter Johnny Mercer, Harry James and his orchestra, and the Harry Zimmerman Chorus. Jack Rourke was the announcer for the NBC version, and John Holbrook had that role when the program was on CBS. Directors were Jerry Lawrence. Robert Lee, and Bill Brennan; writers were Lawrence, Lee, and Robert Smith.

== Format ==
Originating in Hollywood, California, Call for Music initially highlighted top tunes of the week in each episode (much like the long-running Your Hit Parade) with the musical numbers selected according to the program's own ranking criteria. Glenn T. Eskew described the structure of the show in his book, Johnny Mercer: Southern Songwriter for the World:

A typical program began with Shore, Mercer, and James playing an arrangement of a hit song, such as "Put 'em in a Box," "Manana," or "Bride and Groom Polka." Then each artist individually sang a number. Philip Morris bracketed the show's opening and closing with its advertising image of the bellboy selling cigarettes in the lobby by having Johnny Roventini sing out in a high-pitched and perfect B flat with an annoying twang, "Call for Philip Moooooooorreeeeees." The announcer Jack Rourke read commercials at both ends and in the middle of the show that often extolled the brand as being recommended by "imminent nose and throat specialists" for fighting "cigarette hangover" and sore throats.

Eskew noted that during the program's time on the air, the focus shifted from top tunes to Broadway medleys to various "popular songs of the day".

== Financial problems ==
Call for Music ended after its sponsor decided to reduce the budget for the show's next season. An article in the June 19, 1948, issue of the trade publication Billboard reported that Philip Morris "is set on slashing costs from $11,000 to $8,000 ... feeling that current ratings don't justify the high-priced offering." The article added that the budget reduction would mean a lower salary for Shore, elimination of James and his orchestra, and the likely dropping of Mercer.
