= A Great New Star =

- Starring: Dinah Shore
- Release date: 1952
- Running time: 12 minutes
- Country: United States
- Language: English

A Great New Star is a 1952 musical sponsored film starring Dinah Shore, with her singing "See the U.S.A. in Your Chevrolet" (at the time, she starred in a twice-weekly 15-minute musical interlude for Chevrolet on NBC-TV). It starts off with her singing "It's a Most Unusual Day", and then shows an ephemeral film being made. The ending has her singing the Chevrolet jingle with shots of Chevrolet cars and America. It was made by the Jam Handy Organization.
