= Somebody Loves Me (Dinah Shore album) =

Studio album by Dinah Shore
- Released: February 1960
- Recorded: 1959
- Venue: Capitol Studios, Hollywood, Los Angeles
- Genre: Traditional pop, jazz
- Label: Capitol T-1296
- Producer: Voyle Gilmore

Dinah Shore chronology
Dinah Sings, Previn Plays (1959)	Somebody Loves Me (1960)	Dinah Sings Some Blues with Red (1960)

Somebody Loves Me is a 1960 album by Dinah Shore accompanied by an orchestra arranged and conducted by André Previn. The album was Shore's second recording for Capitol Records.

Billboard magazine chose the album as one of its Spotlight Winners of the Week in their February 1, 1960 issue.

described the album as having a "more subdued vein" than her previous album, Dinah, Yes Indeed! and that Previn's arrangements complimented her "pleasing vocals fully".

== Reception ==
Professional ratings
Review scores
Source	Rating
Allmusic	4/5 stars

William Ruhlmann reviewed the album for Allmusic and wrote that "Working with sympathetic arrangements by conductor André Previn, [Shore] essayed a set of ballad standards for an album that ranked with the kind of LPs that Frank Sinatra, Dean Martin, Nat "King" Cole, Peggy Lee and Judy Garland were recording at Capitol at the same time. By now, with her TV stardom, her days as a major recording artist were behind her, which in retrospect is too bad, because albums like this should have raised her critical standing to a par with that of her label mates".

== Track listing ==
1. "It's Easy To Remember" (Richard Rodgers, Lorenz Hart) – 3:38
2. "East of the Sun (and West of the Moon)" (Brooks Bowman) – 3:00
3. "I Hadn't Anyone Till You" (Ray Noble) – 2:36
4. "When I Grow Too Old To Dream" (Sigmund Romberg, Oscar Hammerstein II) – 3:04
5. "Something to Remember You By" (Arthur Schwartz, Howard Dietz) – 3:30
6. Medley: "Remember"/"All Alone"/"Always" (Irving Berlin)/(Berlin)/(Berlin) ― 4:43
7. "I Only Have Eyes For You" (Harry Warren, Al Dubin) – 3:36
8. "My Buddy" (Walter Donaldson, Gus Kahn) – 3:25
9. "Somebody Loves Me" (George Gershwin, Buddy DeSylva, Ballard MacDonald) – 4:22

== Personnel ==
- Dinah Shore – vocal
- André Previn – arranger, piano on "Somebody Loves Me"
- Voyle Gilmore – production
