= Triplicate (Bob Dylan album) =

2017 triple studio album by Bob Dylan

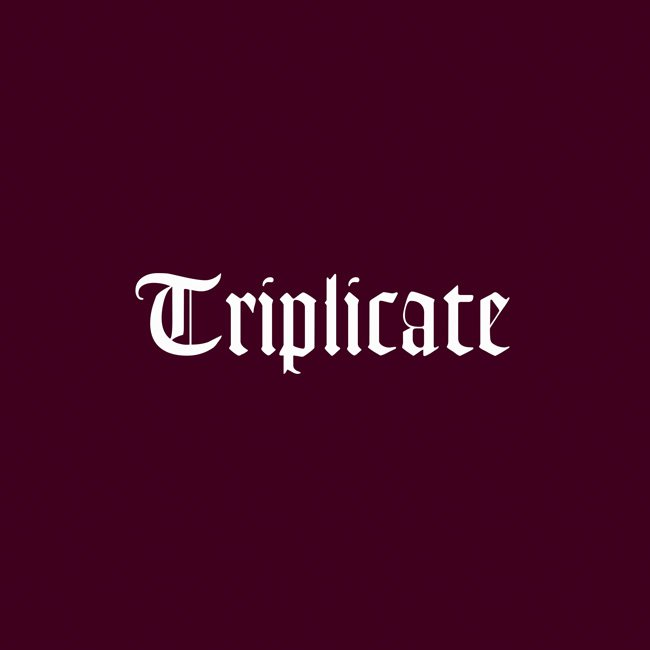

Studio album by Bob Dylan
- Released: March 31, 2017
- Studio: Capitol (Hollywood)
- Genre: Traditional pop
- Length: 95:42
- Label: Columbia
- Producer: Jack Frost

Bob Dylan chronology
The 1966 Live Recordings (2016)	Triplicate (2017)	The Bootleg Series Vol. 13: Trouble No More 1979–1981 (2017)

Bob Dylan studio album chronology
Fallen Angels (2016)	Triplicate (2017)	Rough and Rowdy Ways (2020)

Singles from Triplicate
- 1. "I Could Have Told You" Released: January 30, 2017; 2. "My One and Only Love" Released: February 17, 2017; 3. "Stardust" Released: March 10, 2017

Triplicate is the thirty-eighth studio album by Bob Dylan, released by Columbia Records on March 31, 2017. As with most of Dylan's 21st century output, he produced the album himself under the pseudonym Jack Frost.

Like Dylan's previous two studio albums, Triplicate features covers of classic American songs recorded live in the studio with his touring band and without the use of overdubs. The album is Dylan's first three-disc album, featuring thirty songs across its three discs, each individually titled and presented in a thematically-arranged 10-song sequence.

As with his previous two albums of American pop standards, Triplicate received widespread critical acclaim. It was nominated at the 60th Annual Grammy Awards in the category of Best Traditional Pop Vocal Album. Despite the favorable reviews, it peaked at number 37 on the Billboard 200 and number 17 on the UK Albums Chart.

== Background and recording ==
Following Shadows in the Night in 2015 and Fallen Angels in 2016, Triplicate was Dylan's third album in three years to consist entirely of "standards" from the Great American Songbook. According to Dylan, the first two albums "only were part of the picture", and he felt it necessary to explore this music in further detail. Although the songs could have fit on two CDs, Dylan wanted each disc to be only 32 minutes long as he believed some of his previous albums had been "overloaded", resulting in a "thin" audio quality when pressed on vinyl records. The three discs were thematically divided, with "one disc foreshadowing the next".

The title and concept of Triplicate are thought by some to be an homage to Frank Sinatra's 1980 Reprise Records 3-LP set Trilogy: Past Present Future, each album of which has a separate title like the three albums of Dylan's set. According to Dylan scholar Alan Fraser, however, "Andreas Volkert has researched the playing cards depicted on the cover of Fallen Angels and discovered they were made by the famous playing card manufacturer Andrew Dougherty and called 'Chinese Dragon Back No. 81'. Andreas has now discovered that Andrew Dougherty also created in 1876 a set of playing cards in which a miniature card was placed in the top left and bottom right corners of the cards called... 'Triplicate'! The original 1876 'Triplicate' cards were reissued in 2014. It's very possible this could be another source of inspiration for Bob's album title".

The songs were recorded in Capitol Studios in Los Angeles with Dylan's touring band, without the use of overdubs. According to Dylan, the songs were performed "tightly" according to written arrangements, and there was virtually no improvisation during the recording sessions.

== Release and promotion ==
Dylan had teased the album's release by performing "Once Upon a Time", a song previously recorded by both Frank Sinatra and Tony Bennett, for the Tony Bennett Celebrates 90: The Best Is Yet to Come concert, which premiered on NBC on December 20, 2016. Actor Steve Buscemi introduced Dylan's performance by noting that Dylan and Bennett "share a friendship based on their mutual interests of music, painting and social activism". Spin Magazine called the performance "gorgeous" the following day.

Triplicate was preceded by the release of three singles—"I Could Have Told You" on January 30, 2017, "My One and Only Love" on February 17, and "Stardust" on March 10. While "I Could Have Told You" was also released on promotional CD, the other singles were released only digitally. All three were featured in videos posted to YouTube of the tracks being played on a vinyl record player, complete with surface noise.

The album was released on March 31 in CD, vinyl, deluxe vinyl, and digital formats. The deluxe vinyl is individually numbered and comes in a hardbound case with swing pockets.

== Packaging ==
Triplicate has the most minimalist cover art of Dylan's entire discography: only the album's title is featured, printed in white lettering and "Goudy Text" font against a glossy, deep purple background. There are two photographs of Dylan on the album's inner sleeves that are credited to John Shearer. The package also contains an essay by novelist Tom Piazza, the first time liner notes have appeared in a Dylan studio album since Dylan's self-penned notes for World Gone Wrong in 1993. Among the claims in Piazza's essay is the notion that Dylan is presenting songs that "you may have thought you knew to the final decimal point" but which "you may feel you are hearing for the first time, transfigured". This echoes the theme of "transfiguration" on Dylan's previous album of original material, 2012's Tempest, which Dylan explicitly discussed with Mikal Gilmore in a Rolling Stone interview at the time of that album's release.

== Critical reception and legacy ==
Professional ratings
Aggregate scores
Source	Rating
AnyDecentMusic?	7.6/10
Metacritic	80/100
Review scores
Source	Rating
AllMusic	4/5 stars
Drowned in Sound	8/10
Exclaim!	8/10
The Guardian	5/5 stars
The Irish Times	4/5 stars
Now	5/5 stars
Pitchfork	6.5/10
Rolling Stone	4.5/5 stars
Slant	4/5 stars
The Times	4/5 stars

The release of Triplicate garnered further critical acclaim for Dylan and his interpretations of American standards. At Metacritic, which assigns a normalized rating out of 100 to reviews from critics, the album received an average score of 80, which indicates "generally favorable reviews", based on 21 professional reviews. At AnyDecentMusic?, which collates critical reviews from more than 50 media sources, the album scored 7.6 points out of 10.

In a review for The Guardian, critic Jon Dennis called Dylan "a prism through which American music is revealed in new and fascinating ways", and considering his chosen material, "Dylan is unintimidated by their pedigree". Mikal Gilmore wrote in Rolling Stone that Dylan was able to "wield phrasing as effectively as Sinatra himself". Jeremy Winograd of Slant Magazine said that Dylan had "breathed new life into these songs, unearthing, or at least rediscovering, an emotional gravitas within them". Stephen Thomas Erlewine of AllMusic said that the collection "cements his place as one of the most distinctive interpreters of the Great American Songbook".

A few critics gave more lukewarm appraisals of the album. Mike Powell of Pitchfork said that "the ballads, beautiful as they are, sometimes feel static, bereft of that innerverse opened by singers like Johnny Hartman or, say, Willie Nelson, whose own standards album Stardust remains a high point for projects like this". In a review entitled "Bob Dylan should stop crooning and get back to writing songs", Neil McCormick of The Telegraph argued that "Triplicate is an act of self-indulgence only of interest to completists". While "you may find yourself drawn into Dylan's peculiar rhythm, surrendering to the delicate mood, and really hearing these gorgeous old songs anew," he said, "we might be intrigued to read Picasso's poetry or hear Pinter's songbook but no one needs five volumes of it. Now it is surely time to find out what all of this is bringing to Dylan's own original art. He didn't win the Nobel Prize for crooning".

NJArts critic Jay Lustig considered Triplicate a "mere footnote" to Dylan's career but identified "When the World Was Young" as his favorite song on the album.

When critic Ray Padgett ranked all 52 of the songs from Dylan's American Songbook albums in 2017, six of his top 10 choices were from Triplicate. The highest rated was "The September of My Years" at number two, about which Padgett wrote, "Accompanied by little more than some steel guitar and [Tony] Garnier’s bass (there it is again), Dylan delivers one of his best-ever vocal performances".

"Why Was I Born?", the album's closing track, was placed 19th on Rolling Stone's 2020 list of Dylan's best songs of the 21st century. In an article accompanying the list, critic Jon Dolan wrote: "Dylan croons, his gruff moan giving these lovelorn riddles an existential weight, as if, having lived deep into his seventies, he’s wondering more urgently than ever how to make his life matter. As always, he makes the story his own".

== Commercial performance ==
Triplicate peaked at number 37 on the Billboard 200, charting for only two weeks before falling off. It also reached number 17 on the UK Albums Chart, spending two weeks on the chart.

== Track listing ==
Disc one – 'Til the Sun Goes Down
No.	Title	Writer(s)	Length
1.	"I Guess I'll Have to Change My Plans"	Arthur Schwartz, Howard Dietz	2:27
2.	"September of My Years"	Jimmy Van Heusen, Sammy Cahn	3:25
3.	"I Could Have Told You"	Carl Sigman, Jimmy Van Heusen	3:37
4.	"Once Upon a Time"	Charles Strouse, Lee Adams	3:37
5.	"Stormy Weather"	Harold Arlen, Ted Koehler	3:05
6.	"This Nearly Was Mine"	Richard Rodgers, Oscar Hammerstein II	2:48
7.	"That Old Feeling"	Sammy Fain, Lew Brown	3:38
8.	"It Gets Lonely Early"	Jimmy Van Heusen, Sammy Cahn	3:10
9.	"My One and Only Love"	Guy Wood, Robert Mellin	3:21
10.	"Trade Winds"	Cliff Friend, Charles Tobias	2:40
Total length:			31:48

Disc two – Devil Dolls
No.	Title	Writer(s)	Length
1.	"Braggin'"	Jimmy Shirl, Robert Marko, Henry Katzman	2:44
2.	"As Time Goes By"	Herman Hupfeld	3:22
3.	"Imagination"	Jimmy Van Heusen, Johnny Burke	2:34
4.	"How Deep Is the Ocean"	Irving Berlin	3:23
5.	"P.S. I Love You"	Gordon Jenkins, Johnny Mercer	4:17
6.	"The Best Is Yet to Come"	Cy Coleman, Carolyn Leigh	2:57
7.	"But Beautiful"	Jimmy Van Heusen, Johnny Burke	3:22
8.	"Here's That Rainy Day"	Jimmy Van Heusen, Johnny Burke	3:27
9.	"Where Is the One"	Alec Wilder, Edwin Finckel	3:14
10.	"There's a Flaw in My Flue"	Jimmy Van Heusen, Johnny Burke	2:47
Total length:			32:07

Disc three – Comin' Home Late
No.	Title	Writer(s)	Length
1.	"Day In, Day Out"	Rube Bloom, Johnny Mercer	3:01
2.	"I Couldn't Sleep a Wink Last Night"	Harold Adamson, Jimmy McHugh	3:15
3.	"Sentimental Journey"	Les Brown, Ben Homer, Bud Green	3:11
4.	"Somewhere Along the Way"	Jimmy Van Heusen, Sammy Gallop	3:18
5.	"When the World Was Young"	Philippe-Gérard, Angèle Vannier, Johnny Mercer	3:47
6.	"These Foolish Things"	Eric Maschwitz, Jack Strachey	4:11
7.	"You Go to My Head"	John Frederick Coots, Haven Gillespie	3:06
8.	"Stardust"	Hoagy Carmichael, Mitchell Parish	2:30
9.	"It's Funny to Everyone but Me"	Jack Lawrence	2:38
10.	"Why Was I Born"	Jerome Kern, Oscar Hammerstein II	2:50
Total length:			31:47

Streaming sampler
No.	Title	Writer(s)	Length
1.	"The Best Is Yet to Come"	Cy Coleman, Carolyn Leigh	2:58
2.	"These Foolish Things"	Eric Maschwitz, Jack Strachey	4:11
3.	"It's Funny to Everyone but Me"	Jack Lawrence	2:39
4.	"When the World Was Young"	Philippe-Gérard, Angèle Vannier, Johnny Mercer	3:47
5.	"I Could Have Told You"	Carl Sigman, Jimmy Van Heusen	3:40
6.	"Sentimental Journey"	Les Brown, Ben Homer, Bud Green	3:12
7.	"That Old Feeling"	Sammy Fain, Lew Brown	3:39
8.	"My One and Only Love"	Guy Wood, Robert Mellin	3:24
9.	"Stardust"	Hoagy Carmichael, Mitchell Parish	2:35
10.	"Once Upon a Time"	Charles Strouse, Lee Adams	3:35
Total length:			33:40

== Personnel ==
Adapted from the liner notes.

- Bob Dylan – vocals

Additional musicians

- Charlie Sexton – guitar
- Dean Parks – guitar
- Donnie Herron – steel guitar
- Tony Garnier – bass guitar
- George Receli – drums

Production and design

- Steve Genewick – assistant engineering
- James Harper – horn arrangements/conducting
- Greg Calbi – mastering
- Geoff Gans – album artwork
- Tom Piazza – liner notes

== Charts ==
=== Weekly charts ===
Chart (2017)	Peak position
Australian Albums (ARIA)	36
Austrian Albums (Ö3 Austria)	4
Belgian Albums (Ultratop Flanders)	7
Belgian Albums (Ultratop Wallonia)	33
Canadian Albums (Billboard)	57
Danish Albums (Hitlisten)	25
Dutch Albums (Album Top 100)	5
Finnish Albums (Suomen virallinen lista)	26
French Albums (SNEP)	20
German Albums (Offizielle Top 100)	7
Greek Albums (IFPI)	8
Irish Albums (IRMA)	5
Italian Albums (FIMI)	9
New Zealand Albums (RMNZ)	27
Norwegian Albums (VG-lista)	10
Portuguese Albums (AFP)	5
Scottish Albums (Official Charts)	7
Spanish Albums (Promusicae)	7
Swedish Albums (Sverigetopplistan)	3
Swiss Albums (Schweizer Hitparade)	10
UK Albums (Official Charts)	17
US Billboard 200	37
US Top Rock Albums (Billboard)	5

=== Year-end charts ===
Chart (2017)	Position
Belgian Albums (Ultratop Flanders)	131
