= The Dinah Shore Show (radio program) =

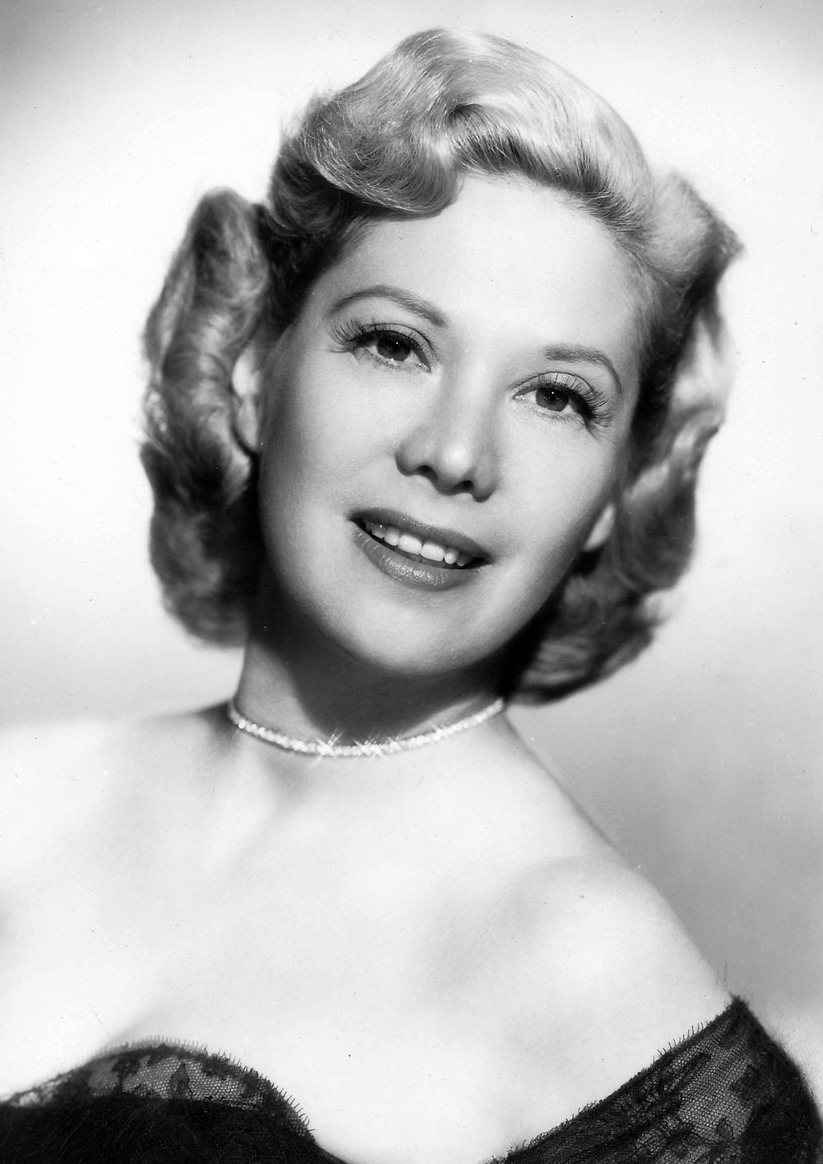
- Dinah Shore
- Other names: Songs by Dinah Shore; In Person, Dinah Shore; The Bird's Eye Open House; The Ford Show; Call for Music
- Country of origin: United States
- Language: English
- Home station: KNX (The Bird's Eye Open House)
- Syndicates: Blue Network; CBS; NBC
- TV adaptations: The Dinah Shore Show (simulcast)
- Starring: Dinah Shore
- Announcer: Harry von Zell; Truman Bradley; John Holbrook; Jack Rourke
- Written by: Ben Brady; Glenn Wheaton; Abe Burrows
- Produced by: William L. Lawrence; Glenhall Taylor; Walter Bunker; Arthur Moore; Billy Wilgus
- Original release: August 6, 1939 – July 1, 1955
- Sponsored by: Bristol Myers (August 6, 1939-April 23, 1943); Birds Eye frozen foods (September 30, 1943-May 30, 1946); Ford Motor Company (September 18, 1946-June 11, 1947); Philip Morris(February 13-June 29, 1948); Chevrolet Dealers (1953-July 1, 1955)

The Dinah Shore Show was a title applied—in some cases specifically and in other cases generically—to several radio musical programs in the United States, some of which had other distinct titles as indicated below. Singer Dinah Shore starred (or in some cases co-starred) in the programs, some of which were broadcast on the Blue Network, while others were on CBS or NBC.

== Format ==
All of the programs featured vocal music by Shore. Comedy and musical performances by other people were often included.

== The Dinah Shore Show (1939–1940) ==
Shore's first radio program began on August 6, 1939, on the Blue Network. The 15-minute program was broadcast on Sunday evenings, with Paul Lavalle leading the orchestra. That series ended on January 14, 1940. A similar Friday-night program began on the same network on June 14, 1940, with Irving Miller in charge of the music. It ended on September 27, 1940.

== Songs by Dinah Shore (1941–1942) ==
On November 2, 1941, Shore began a 15-minute program on NBC-Blue, sponsored by Bristol Myers. Shore continued to sing on Eddie Cantor's weekly program, which had the same sponsor. Gordon Jenkins was the program's music director. Harry von Zell was the announcer and a foil for comedy segments. The program ended on April 26, 1942.

== In Person, Dinah Shore (1942–1943) ==
Originating in Hollywood, this 15-minute program ran from May 1, 1942, to April 23, 1943 on the Blue Network. Truman Bradley was the announcer, and Gordon Jenkins was in charge of the music. William L. Lawrence was the producer. The sponsor was Bristol-Myers.

== The Bird's Eye Open House (1943–1946) ==
Beginning September 30, 1943, Shore starred in The Bird's Eye Open House on CBS. Originating in Hollywood on station KNX, the half-hour show was the first network radio program sponsored by that frozen food brand. Each weekly episode included comedy segments featuring Cornelia Otis Skinner and Roland Young and performances from the Joseph Lilley Singers. The music director was Robert Emmett Dolan. Harry von Zell was the announcer.

Ben Brady and Glenn Wheaton were the program's writers. Glenhall Taylor, Walter Bunker, and Arthur Moore were the producers.

On October 5, 1944, the program shifted to NBC, where it continued until May 30, 1946.

== The Ford Show (1946–1947) ==
Beginning September 18, 1946, Ford Motor Company began sponsoring Shore's program. Shore moved back to CBS, with comedian Peter Lind Hayes featured. Dolan handled the music once again.

Abe Burrows was a writer, and the producer was Billy Wilgus. The 30-minute show ended June 11, 1947.

== Call for Music (1948) ==
Sponsored by Philip Morris cigarettes, Call for Music replaced It Pays to Be Ignorant on CBS on February 13, 1948. Johnny Mercer and Harry James co-starred with Shore. The program switched to NBC on April 20, 1948. A story in the trade publication Broadcasting noted, "The show's format was composed and designed to catch the audience of 18 to 25 years old." John Holbrook and Jack Rourke were the announcers.

== The Dinah Shore Show (1953–1955) ==
Sponsored by Chevrolet Dealers, The Dinah Shore Show as heard on NBC Radio was a simulcast of the sound portion of Shore's television program on NBC.
