= Dinah Sings, Previn Plays =

Studio album by Dinah Shore
- Released: 1960
- Recorded: July 14 – August 9, 1959
- Genre: Jazz
- Length: 32:18
- Label: Capitol
- Producer: Voyle Gilmore

Dinah Shore chronology
Dinah, Yes Indeed! (1959)	Dinah Sings, Previn Plays (1960)	Somebody Loves Me (1960)

Professional ratings
Review scores
Source	Rating
Allmusic	4/5 stars

Dinah Sings, Previn Plays is a 1960 album by Dinah Shore, accompanied by André Previn.

== Track listing ==
For the 2006 Capitol Records Reissue, 69802

1. "The Man I Love" (George Gershwin, Ira Gershwin) – 3:19
2. "April in Paris" (Vernon Duke, Yip Harburg) – 2:58
3. "That Old Feeling" (Lew Brown, Sammy Fain) – 3:13
4. "I've Got You Under My Skin" (Cole Porter) – 2:43
5. "Then I'll Be Tired of You" (Harburg, Arthur Schwartz) – 3:23
6. "Sleepy Time Gal" (Joseph Reed Alden, Raymond B. Egan, Ange Lorenzo, Richard Whiting) – 2:42
7. "My Melancholy Baby" (Ernie Burnett, George Norton) – 3:42
8. "My Funny Valentine" (Lorenz Hart, Richard Rodgers) – 3:36
9. "It Had to Be You" (Isham Jones, Gus Kahn) – 3:26
10. "I'll Be Seeing You" (Fain, Irving Kahal) – 3:10
11. "If I Had You" (James Campbell, Reginald Connelly, Ted Shapiro) – 3:22

Bonus tracks

12. "Like Someone in Love" (Sonny Burke, Jimmy Van Heusen) – 3:00
13. "Stars Fell on Alabama" (Mitchell Parish, Frank Perkins) – 2:54
14. "While We're Young" (William Engvick, Morty Palitz, Alec Wilder) – 3:08
15. "The Man I Love" – 4:17

== Personnel ==
- André Previn – piano
- Dinah Shore – vocals
- Frank Capp – drums
- Red Mitchell – double bass
