= Reminiscing with Dinah Shore =

Studio album by Dinah Shore
- Released: 1947
- Label: Columbia

Reminiscing with Dinah Shore is an album by Dinah Shore, released in 1947 by Columbia Records.

== Releases and critical reception ==
The album was originally released as a set of four 10-inch 78-rpm phonograph records (cat. no. C-192).

In 1949, it was reissued on 33 rpm (one 10-inch LP, catalog no. CL 6069).

Professional ratings
Review scores
Source	Rating
Billboard	80/100 ("excellent")

Billboard reviewed the LP on October 8, 1949, rating it 80 on a scale of 100 ("excellent") and writing: "This is the best kind of pop-packaging for LP purposes. The tunes are easy-on-the-ear ballads, and so is Dinah Shore's velvety singing. You're not likely to weary of even 30 minutes of this sort of music, whether you're listening alone and absorbed or with only half an ear when company's around." The review also noted that, though some of the songs from the album had had a long and successful run as singles, they were "the kind that wear well".

== Track listing ==
Set of four 10-inch 78-rpm records (Columbia C-192)

Side 1
No.	Title	Writer(s)	Length
1.	"I'll Be Seeing You"	Kahal; Fain

Side 2
No.	Title	Writer(s)	Length
1.	"I Guess I'll Have to Change My Plan"	Dietz; Schwartz

Side 3
No.	Title	Writer(s)	Length
1.	"Ma Curly Headed Babby"	Clutsam

Side 4
No.	Title	Writer(s)	Length
1.	"Now That You're Gone"	Kahn; Fiorito

Side 5
No.	Title	Writer(s)	Length
1.	"Little White Lies"	Donaldson

Side 6
No.	Title	Writer(s)	Length
1.	"I Get Along Without You Very Well"	Carmichael

Side 7
No.	Title	Writer(s)	Length
1.	"They Can't Take That Away from Me"	I. Gershwin; G. Gershwin

Side 8
No.	Title	Writer(s)	Length
1.	"I May Be Wrong but, I Think You're Wonderful"	Ruskin; Sullivan

10-inch LP (Columbia CL 6069)

Side 1
No.	Title	Length
1.	"I'll Be Seeing You"
2.	"I Guess I'll Have to Change My Plan"
3.	"Ma Curly Headed Babby"
4.	"Now That You're Gone"

Side 2
No.	Title	Length
1.	"Little White Lies"
2.	"I Get Along Without You Very Well"
3.	"They Can't Take That Away from Me"
4.	"I May Be Wrong but, I Think You're Wonderful"
