= Dinah Sings Some Blues with Red =

Studio album by Dinah Shore
- Released: 1960
- Recorded: 1960
- Genre: Jazz, traditional pop
- Length: 62:46
- Label: Capitol

Dinah Shore chronology
Somebody Loves Me (1959)	Dinah Sings Some Blues with Red (1960)	Vivacious (1960)

Dinah Sings Some Blues with Red is a studio album by singer Dinah Shore and vibraphonist Red Norvo and his quartet. It was released in 1960.

== Track listing ==
1. "Bye Bye Blues" (Fred Hamm, Dave Bennett, Bert Lown, Chauncey Gray) – 2:57
2. "I Can't Face the Music" (Rube Bloom, Ted Koehler) – 2:50
3. "Someday Sweetheart" (John Spikes, Reb Spikes) – 2:24
4. "It's Funny to Everyone but Me" (Jack Lawrence) – 2:14
5. "Who?" (Jerome Kern, Otto Harbach, Oscar Hammerstein II) – 2:13
6. "I Can't Believe That You're in Love with Me" (Jimmy McHugh, Clarence Gaskill) – 3:32
7. "I Ain't Got Nothin' but the Blues" (Duke Ellington, Don George) – 3:52
8. "Lucky In Love" (Buddy De Sylva, Lew Brown, Ray Henderson) – 2:12
9. "Do Nothing till You Hear from Me" (Ellington, Bob Russell) – 3:31
10. "It's All Right with Me" (Cole Porter) – 2:41
11. "Skylark" (Hoagy Carmichael, Johnny Mercer) – 2:23
12. "Lover, Come Back to Me" (Sigmund Romberg, Hammerstein) – 3:39

== Personnel ==
- Dinah Shore – vocals
- Red Norvo – vibraphone
- Jerry Dodgion – alto saxophone, flute
- Jimmy Wyble – guitar
- John Mosher – double bass
- John Markham – drums
