= Dinah, Yes Indeed! =

1959 album by Dinah Shore, arranged by Nelson Riddle

Studio album by Dinah Shore
- Released: 1959
- Recorded: 1958
- Genre: Vocal jazz
- Length: 32:18
- Label: Capitol
- Producer: Voyle Gilmore

Dinah Shore chronology
| Moments Like These (1959) | Dinah, Yes Indeed! (1959) | Dinah Sings, Previn Plays (1960) |

Dinah, Yes Indeed! is a 1958 studio album by Dinah Shore, arranged by Nelson Riddle.

== Track listing ==
1. "It All Depends on You" (Ray Henderson, Buddy DeSylva, Lew Brown) – 2:36
2. "Falling in Love with Love" (Richard Rodgers, Lorenz Hart) – 3:00
3. Medley: "Where or When"/"Easy to Love"/"Get Out of Town"/"They Can't Take That Away from Me" (Rodgers, Hart)/(Cole Porter)/(Porter)/(George Gershwin, Ira Gershwin) – 5:38
4. "Sentimental Journey" (Les Brown, Ben Homer, Bud Green) – 3:29
5. "The One I Love (Belongs to Somebody Else)" (Isham Jones, Gus Kahn) – 3:02
6. "I'm Old Fashioned" (Jerome Kern, Johnny Mercer) – 2:56
7. "Our Love Is Here to Stay" (G. Gershwin, I. Gershwin) – 3:09
8. "Taking a Chance on Love" (Vernon Duke, Ted Fetter, John La Touche) – 2:39
9. "Yes Indeed!" (Sy Oliver) – 5:12

== Personnel ==
- Dinah Shore – vocals
- Nelson Riddle – conductor, arranger
