= Dinah Shore =

American singer and actress (1916–1994)

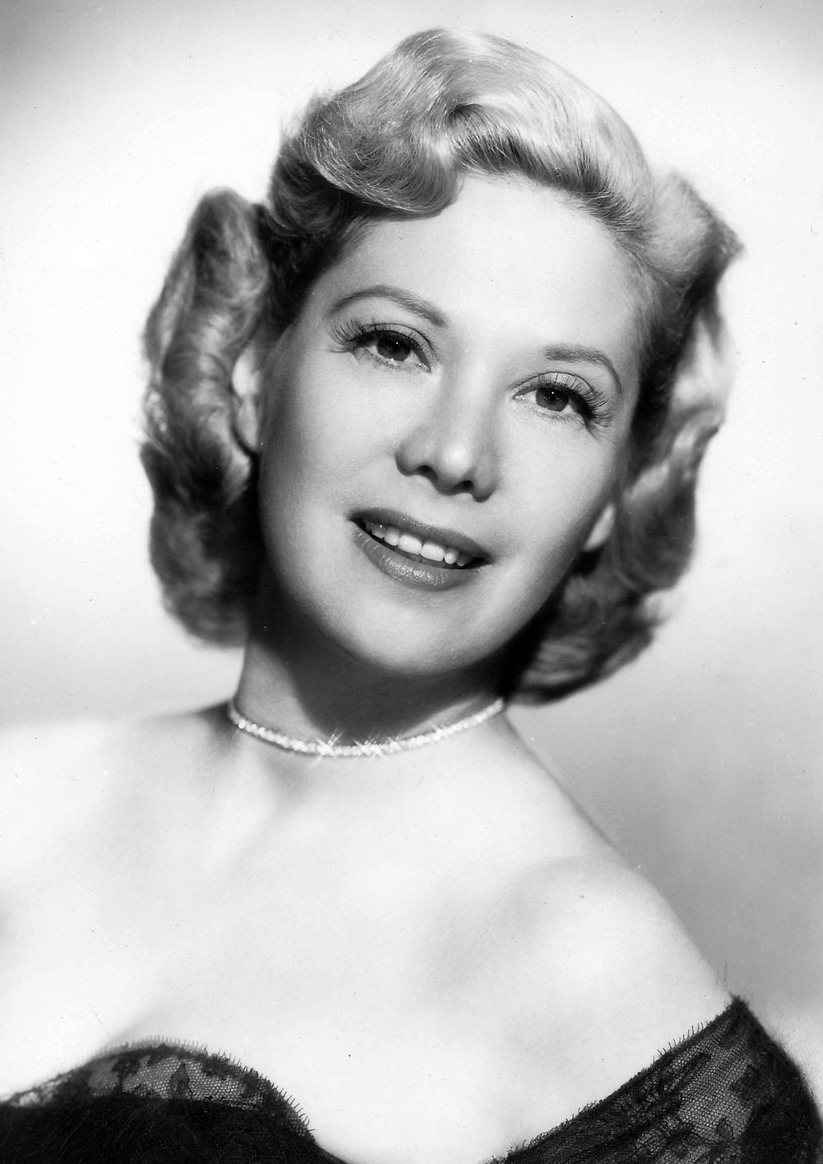
- Publicity photo, 1951
- Born: Frances Rose Shore; February 29, 1916; Winchester, Tennessee, U.S.
- Died: February 24, 1994 (aged 77); Los Angeles, California, U.S.
- Resting place: Hillside Memorial Park
- Education: Vanderbilt University
- Occupations: Singer; actress; talk show host; author
- Years active: 1939–1994
- Known for: The Dinah Shore Show (radio program); The Dinah Shore Show; Dinah Shore Chevy Show; Dinah!
- Spouses: George Montgomery (m. 1943; div. 1963) Maurice F. Smith (m. 1963; div. 1964)
- Partner: Burt Reynolds (1971–1976)
- Children: 2

Dinah Shore (born Frances Rose Shore; February 29, 1916 – February 24, 1994) was an American singer, actress, television personality, author, and talk show host. Born in Winchester, Tennessee and raised in Nashville, Tennessee, she rose to prominence as a recording artist during the Big Band era. She achieved even greater success a decade later in television, mainly as the host of a series of variety programs sponsored by Chevrolet. After failing singing auditions for the bands of Benny Goodman, and both Jimmy and Tommy Dorsey, Shore struck out on her own. She became the first singer of her era to achieve huge solo success. She had a string of eighty charted popular hits, spanning from 1940 to 1957, and after appearing in a handful of feature films, she went on to a four-decade career in American television. She starred in her own music and variety shows from 1951 through 1963 and hosted two talk shows in the 1970s. TV Guide ranked her at number 16 on their list of the top 50 television stars of all time. Stylistically, Shore was compared to two singers who followed her in the mid-to-late 1940s and early 1950s, Jo Stafford and Patti Page.

== Early life ==
Frances "Fanny" Rose Shore was born on February 29, 1916, to Russian-Jewish immigrant shopkeepers, Anna (née Stein) and Solomon Shore, in Winchester, Tennessee. She had an elder sister, eight years her senior, Elizabeth, known as "Bessie". When Fanny was eighteen months old, she was stricken with polio (infantile paralysis). The only known treatment was bed rest and sometimes more extreme care if the child was severely compromised. Her mother provided extensive care for her, which included regular therapeutic massage and a strict exercise program. She recovered, but sustained a deformed foot and limp. Fanny loved to sing as a small child; her mother, a contralto with operatic aspirations, encouraged her. Her father often took her to his store, where she would perform impromptu songs for the customers.

In 1924, the Shore family moved to McMinnville, Tennessee, where her father had opened a department store. By her fifth-grade year, the family had moved to Nashville, where she completed elementary school. Although shy because of her limp, she became actively involved in sports, was a cheerleader at Nashville's Hume-Fogg High School, and was involved in other activities.

When Shore was 16, her mother died unexpectedly from a heart attack. Pursuing her education, Shore enrolled at Vanderbilt University, where she participated in many events and activities, including the Chi chapter of the Alpha Epsilon Phi sorority. She graduated from the university in 1938 with a degree in sociology. She visited the Grand Ole Opry and made her radio debut on Nashville's WSM radio station.

Shore decided to return to pursuing her career in singing, moving to New York City to audition for orchestras and radio stations. At first she went there on a summer break from Vanderbilt, and after graduation, for good. In many of her auditions, she sang the popular song "Dinah". When disc jockey Martin Block could not remember her name, he called her the "Dinah girl", and soon after the name stuck, becoming her stage name. She eventually was hired as a vocalist at radio station WNEW, where she sang with Frank Sinatra. She recorded and performed with the Xavier Cugat orchestra, and signed a recording contract with RCA Victor Records in 1940.

== Music career ==
=== 1940s ===
In March 1939, Shore debuted on national radio on the Sunday-afternoon CBS Radio program, Ben Bernie's Orchestra. In February 1940, she became a featured vocalist on the NBC Radio program The Chamber Music Society of Lower Basin Street, a showcase for traditional Dixieland and blues songs. With her, the program became so popular, it was moved from 4:30 Sunday afternoon to a 9:00 Monday night time slot in September. In her primetime debut for "the music of the Three Bs, Barrelhouse, Boogie-woogie, and the Blues", she was introduced as "Mademoiselle Dinah 'Diva' Shore, who starts a fire by rubbing two notes together!" She recorded with the two Basin Street bands for RCA Victor; one of her records was the eponymous Dinah's Blues.

Shore's singing came to the attention of Eddie Cantor. He signed her as a regular on his radio show, Time to Smile, in 1940. Shore credits him for teaching her self-confidence, comedic timing, and the ways of connecting with an audience. In 1943, Shore appeared in her first movie, Thank Your Lucky Stars, starring Cantor. In August 1944 she toured the European Theater of Operations hosted by Communications Zone commander Lt. Gen. John C. H. Lee.

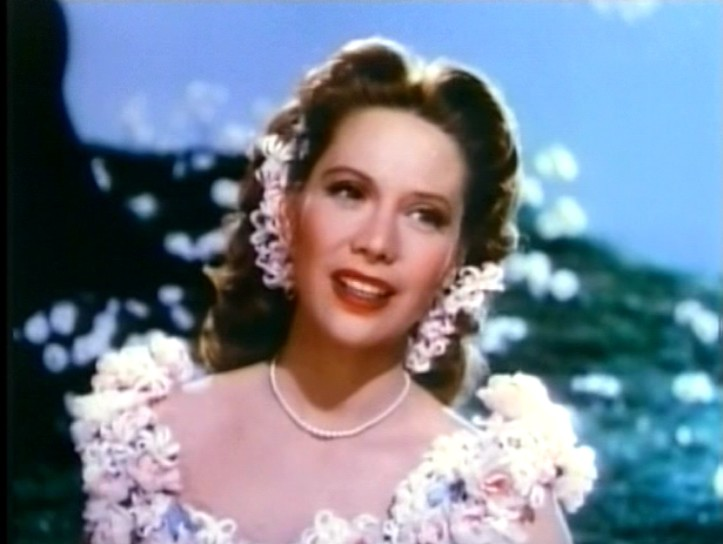
Shore as Julia Sanderson in Till the Clouds Roll By (1946)

She soon went to another radio show, Paul Whiteman Presents. During this time, the United States was involved in World War II, and Shore became a favorite with the troops. She had hits, including "Blues in the Night", b/w "Sometimes" (Non-album track) "Jim", "You'd Be So Nice to Come Home To", and "I'll Walk Alone", the first of her number-one hits. "Blues in the Night" sold over one million copies, and was awarded a gold disc by the RIAA.

Shore continued appearing in radio shows throughout the 1940s, including The Bird's Eye Open House and Ford Radio Show. In early 1946, she moved to a new label, the CBS-owned Columbia Records. At Columbia, Shore enjoyed the greatest commercial success of her recording career, starting with her first Columbia single release, "Shoo-Fly Pie and Apple Pan Dowdy", and peaking with the most popular song of 1948, "Buttons and Bows", (with Henri René & Orchestra), which was number one for ten weeks, and her second million selling record. Other number-one hits at Columbia included "The Gypsy" and "The Anniversary Song". Shore soon became a successful singing star with her own radio show, Call for Music, which was broadcast on CBS from February 13, 1948, to April 16, 1948, and on NBC from April 20, 1948, to June 29, 1948.

One of her most popular recordings was the holiday perennial "Baby, It's Cold Outside" with Buddy Clark from 1949. The song was covered by many other artists, such as Ella Fitzgerald. Other hits during her four years at Columbia included "Laughing on the Outside (Crying on the Inside)", "I Wish I Didn't Love You So", "(I Love You) For Sentimental Reasons", "Doin' What Comes Natur'lly", and "Dear Hearts and Gentle People". She was a regular with Jack Smith on his quarter-hour radio show on CBS from 1950 to 1951.

Shore was a musical guest in the films Thank Your Lucky Stars (1943), Follow the Boys (1944), and Till the Clouds Roll By (1946) and had starring roles in Danny Kaye's debut Up in Arms (1944) and Belle of the Yukon (1944). She lent her musical voice to two Disney films: Make Mine Music (1946) and Fun and Fancy Free (1947). Her last starring film role was for Paramount Pictures in Aaron Slick from Punkin Crick (1952).

=== 1950s ===
In 1950, Shore returned to RCA Victor with a deal to record 100 sides for $1 million (equivalent to $13.4 million in 2025). The hits kept coming, but with less frequency, and were not charting as high as in the 1940s. Shore's biggest hits of this era were "My Heart Cries for You" and "Sweet Violets", both peaking at number three in 1951. Several duets with Tony Martin did well, with "A Penny a Kiss" being the most popular, reaching number eight. "Blue Canary" was a 1953 hit, and her covers of "Changing Partners" and "If I Give My Heart to You" were popular top-20 hits. "Love and Marriage" and "Whatever Lola Wants" were top-20 hits from 1955.

Shore singing "See the USA in Your Chevrolet" in a television advertisement, 1959

"Chantez, Chantez" was her last top-20 hit, staying on the charts for over 20 weeks in 1957. Shore remained at RCA Victor until 1958, and during that time, released albums including Bouquet of Blues, Once in a While, and Vivacious, which were collections of singles with different orchestras and conductors such as Frank DeVol and Hugo Winterhalter. The studio albums Holding Hands at Midnight, from 1955, and Moments Like These, from 1958, recorded in stereo, with orchestra under the musical direction of Harry Zimmerman, who performed the same duties on The Dinah Shore Chevy Show, were the exceptions.

=== Recording career after the 1950s ===
In 1959, Shore left RCA Victor for Capitol Records. Although she recorded only one minor hit for her new label ("I Ain't Down Yet", which peaked at 102 on Billboard's pop chart in 1960), the collaboration produced four "theme albums" that paired her with arranger Nelson Riddle (Dinah, Yes Indeed!), conductor and accompanist André Previn (Somebody Loves Me and Dinah Sings, Previn Plays), and jazz's Red Norvo (Dinah Sings Some Blues with Red). Her final two Capitol albums were Dinah, Down Home and The Fabulous Hits (Newly Recorded).

Shore was dropped by Capitol in 1962 and recorded only a handful of albums over the next two decades. She recorded Lower Basin Street Revisited for friend Frank Sinatra's Reprise label in 1965, Songs for Sometime Losers (Project 3, 1967), Country Feelin' (Decca, 1969), Once Upon A Summertime (Stanyan, 1975), and Dinah!, a double LP for Capitol in 1976. She recorded this album at the height of her talk show fame, and it featured her take on contemporary hits such as "50 Ways to Leave Your Lover", "The Hungry Years", and "Theme from Mahogany (Do You Know Where You're Going To)". Her final studio album was released in 1979, Dinah!: I've Got a Song, for the Children's Television Workshop.

== Acting career ==
=== Radio ===
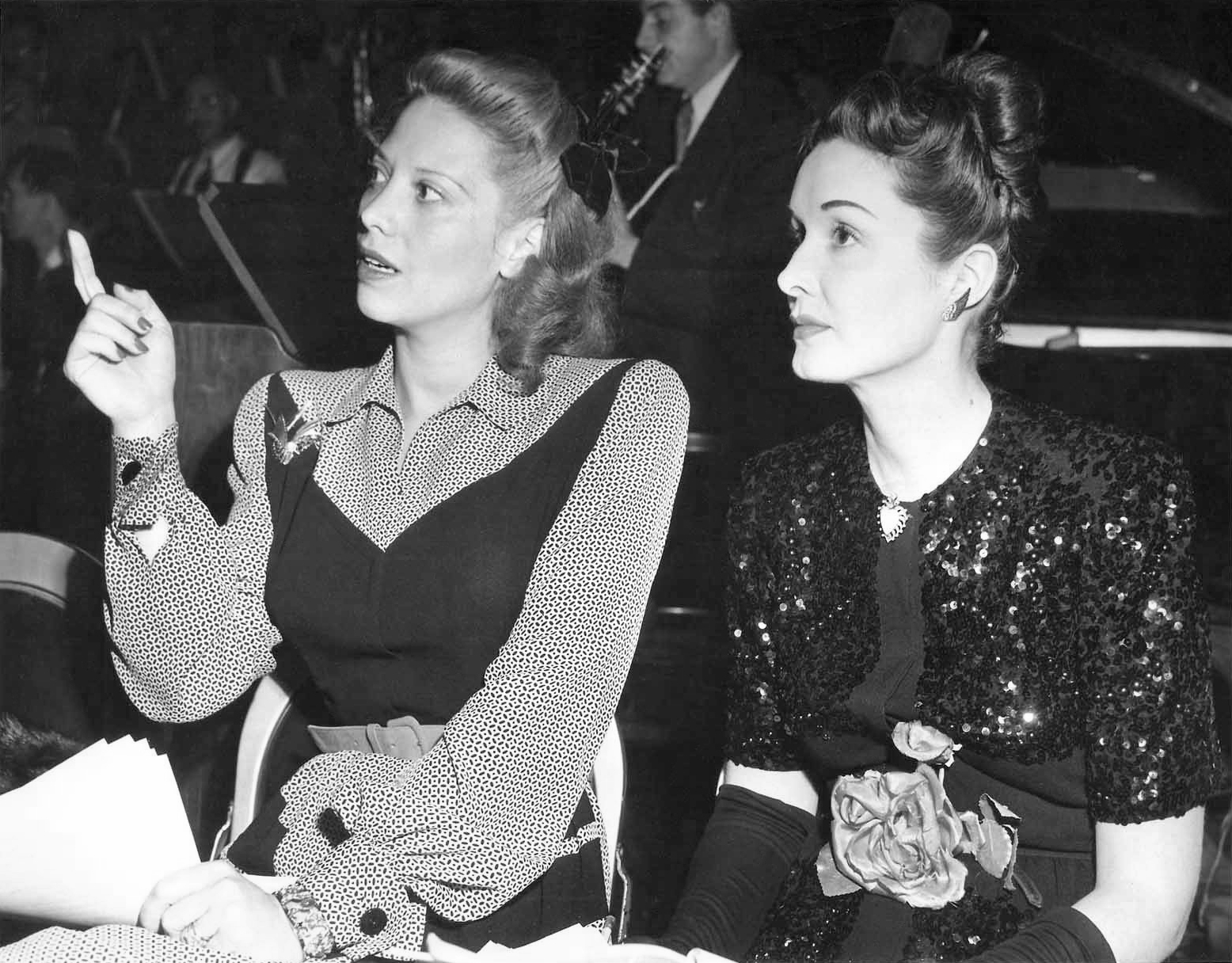
Shore (left) and Gail Patrick in the CBS Radio studio at a rehearsal for The Screen Guild Theater (1945)

Shore starred in seven radio series of her own between 1941 and 1954. She made hundreds of guest appearances in shows including an episode of Suspense ("Frankie and Johnny", May 5, 1952).

=== Early television career ===
Soon after Shore arrived in New York in 1937, aged 21, Shore made her first television appearances on experimental broadcasts for NBC over station W2XBS in New York (now WNBC). Twelve years later, in 1949, she made her commercial television debut on The Ed Wynn Show from Los Angeles over CBS and on Easter Sunday 1950, made a guest appearance on Bob Hope's first network television show on NBC. After guest spots on many television shows, she was given her own program, The Dinah Shore Show on NBC on November 27, 1951. Vic Schoen was her musical director from 1951 to 1954, and also arranged music for her on The Colgate Comedy Hour (1954).

In 1956, Shore began hosting a monthly series of one-hour, full-color spectaculars as part of NBC's The Chevy Show series. These proved so popular, the show was renamed The Dinah Shore Chevy Show the following season, with Shore becoming the full-time host, helming three of four weeks in the month. Broadcast live and in NBC's famous "Living Color", this variety show was one of the most popular of the 1950s and early 1960s and featured the television debuts of stars of the era, such as Yves Montand and Maureen O'Hara, and featured Shore in performances alongside Ella Fitzgerald, Mahalia Jackson, Peggy Lee, Frank Sinatra, and Pearl Bailey. Tennessee Ernie Ford was a featured guest on one show, and she introduced him, tongue-in-cheek, as "Tennessee Ernie CHEVROLET!!" She also appeared as a guest on The Pat Boone Chevy Showroom.

The Dinah Shore Chevy Show ran through the 1960–61 season, after which Chevrolet dropped sponsorship, and Shore hosted a series of monthly broadcasts sponsored by the American Dairy Association and Green Stamps. Simply called The Dinah Shore Show, Shore's guests included Nat "King" Cole, Bing Crosby, Jack Lemmon, Boris Karloff, Betty Hutton, Art Carney, and a young Barbra Streisand. Over twelve seasons, from 1951 to 1963, Shore made 125 hour-long programs and 444 fifteen-minute shows. She always ended her televised programs by throwing an enthusiastic kiss directly to the cameras (and viewers) and exclaiming "MWAH!" to the audience.

Shore also appeared in four specials for ABC (in black-and-white) in the 1964–65 season. They were sponsored by the Purex Corporation.

=== Later television career ===
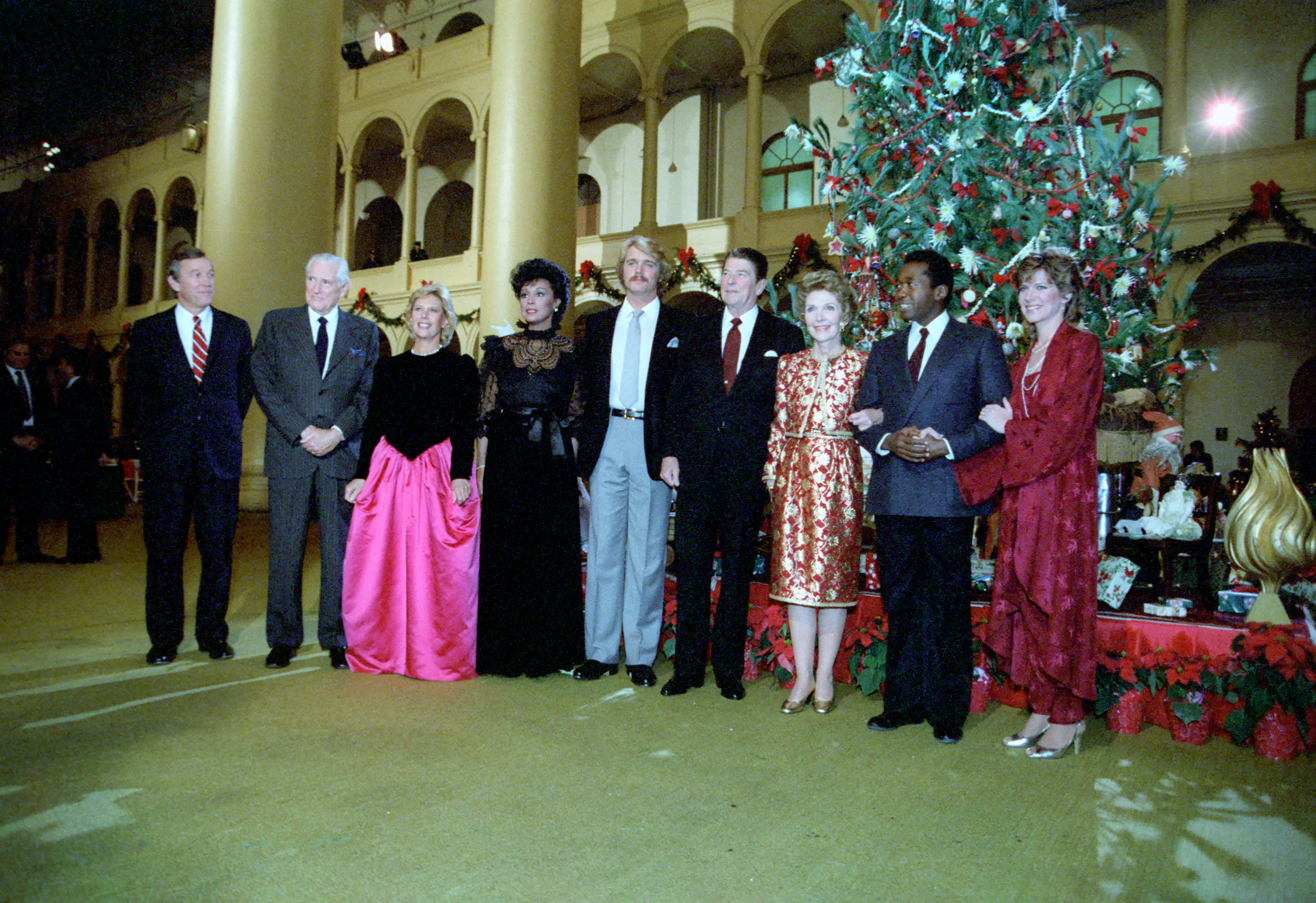
U.S. President Ronald Reagan and First Lady Nancy Reagan with a group at NBC's 1982 taping of its "Christmas in Washington" special in the Pension Building in Washington, D.C. Left to right: NBC News anchor Roger Mudd, CBS News reporter Eric Sevareid, Dinah Shore, actress Diahann Carroll, actor and musician John Schneider, President Ronald Reagan, First Lady Nancy Reagan, actor Ben Vereen, and entertainer Debby Boone.

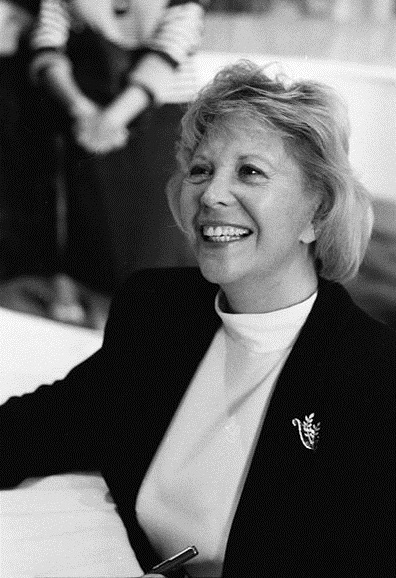
Shore in 1990

From 1970 through 1980, Shore hosted two daytime programs, Dinah's Place (1970–1974) on NBC and Dinah! (later Dinah and Friends) in syndication from 1974 through 1980 and a third cable program from 1989 to 1992. Dinah's Place, primarily sponsored by Colgate-Palmolive (which later sponsored her women's golf tournament), was a 30-minute Monday-through-Friday program broadcast at 10:00 am (ET) over NBC, her network home since 1939. Shore described this show as a "Do-Show" as opposed to a chat show because she would have her guests demonstrate an unexpected skill, for example, Frank Sinatra sharing his spaghetti sauce recipe, Vice President Spiro Agnew playing keyboard accompanying Shore on "Sophisticated Lady", or Ginger Rogers showing Shore how to throw a clay pot on a potter's wheel.

Although Dinah's Place featured famous guest stars, Shore often grilled lesser-known lifestyle experts on nutrition, exercise, or homemaking. Despite being one of the more popular programs in NBC's morning lineup, dominating in the timeslot, facing out The Lucy Show reruns on CBS and local programming on ABC, it was the exit of Bud Grant from NBC and the arrival of Lin Bolen, who wanted to get rid of aging programming to compete with CBS' rising game show block, this show left the air in 1974 after NBC sent a telegram to Shore congratulating her on her Emmy win – at the same time informing her the show was being cancelled, because it broke up a "game show programming block" and competition from The Joker's Wild on CBS, which started two years earlier. Eventually, Bolen replaced Dinah's Place with a new daytime version of Name That Tune. Thus ended the network's 35-year association with Shore. She returned that fall with Dinah!, a syndicated 90-minute daily talk show (also seen in a 60-minute version on some stations) that put the focus on top guest stars and entertainment. This show was seen as competition for Mike Douglas and Merv Griffin, whose shows had been on the air for ten years when Dinah! debuted. Frequent guests included entertainment figures (Lucille Ball, Bob Hope, and Jimmy Stewart), as well as regular contributors including lifestyle guru Dr. Wayne Dyer.

Unexpected rock music performance appearances included Tina Turner, David Bowie, and Iggy Pop. Shore also appeared on the Norman Lear comedy-soap opera Mary Hartman, Mary Hartman in April 1976. On the show, Shore interviewed country-singing character Loretta Haggars (played by Mary Kay Place) and included a controversial comment from Haggars during her appearance on a "live" airing of Shore's talk show. Comedian Andy Kaufman in his Tony Clifton guise appeared on her show but did not, as rumored, throw eggs at Shore or pour them on her head.

Shore, with her Dixie drawl and demure manner, was identified with the South, and guests on her shows often commented on it. She spoofed this image by playing Melody in "Went with the Wind!", the famous Gone with the Wind parody for The Carol Burnett Show. In the summer of 1976, Shore hosted Dinah and Her New Best Friends, an eight-week summer replacement series for The Carol Burnett Show which featured a cast of young hopefuls such as Diana Canova and Gary Mule Deer, along with such seasoned guests as Jean Stapleton and Linda Lavin. Shore guest-starred on Pee-wee's Playhouse Christmas Special, calling Pee-wee on his picturephone and singing "The 12 Days of Christmas". Throughout the special, Pee-wee walks past the picturephone, only to hear her going past the original 12 days ("...on the 500th day of Christmas ...").

Shore finished her television career by appearing on Murder, She Wrote in 1989, and hosting A Conversation with Dinah (1989–1992) on the cable network TNN (The Nashville Network). This half-hour show consisted of one-on-one interviews with celebrities and comedians (such as Bob Hope), former boyfriends (Burt Reynolds in a special one-hour episode), and political figures (former President Gerald Ford and his wife and former first lady Betty Ford). In a coup, Shore got the first post-White House interview given by former first lady Nancy Reagan. Around this time, she gained a contract as television spokeswoman for Holly Farms chicken. In the 1980s, Shore sang in Glendale Federal Bank television commercials. Her last television special, Dinah Comes Home Again (TNN 1991), brought Shore's career full-circle, taking her back to the stage of the Grand Ole Opry, which she first visited some sixty years earlier. Shore won nine Emmys, a Peabody Award, and a Golden Globe Award. Shore's talk shows sometimes included cooking segments, and she wrote cookbooks including Someone's in the Kitchen with Dinah.

== Personal life ==
=== Marriage and children ===
Shore was married to actor George Montgomery from 1943 to 1962. She gave birth to daughter Melissa Ann "Missy" Montgomery, in January 1948. Later the couple adopted a son, John David "Jody" Montgomery. Missy Montgomery also became an actress.

George Jacobs, in his memoir Mr. S about Frank Sinatra, for whom he worked as a longtime valet, claimed Shore and Sinatra had a long-standing affair in the 1950s. After her divorce in 1963 from Montgomery, she briefly married professional tennis player Maurice F. Smith. Her romances of the later 1960s involved comedian Dick Martin, singer Eddie Fisher, and actor Rod Taylor.

Starting in 1971, Shore had a six-year public romance with actor Burt Reynolds, who was 20 years her junior.

Her daughter, Melissa Montgomery, is the owner of the rights to most of Shore's television series. In March 2003, PBS presented MWAH! The Best of The Dinah Shore Show 1956–1963, an hour-long special of early color videotaped footage of Shore in duets with guests Ella Fitzgerald, Jack Lemmon, Frank Sinatra, Bing Crosby, Pearl Bailey, George Burns, Groucho Marx, Peggy Lee, and Mahalia Jackson.

=== Golf ===
Shore, who famously loved playing golf, was a longtime supporter of women's professional golf. In 1972, she helped found the Colgate Dinah Shore Golf Tournament, which, in its current identity as the Chevron Championship, remains one of the major golf tournaments on the LPGA Tour. Until 2022, the tournament was held each spring at Mission Hills Country Club, near Shore's former home in Palm Springs, California. The event moved to Texas in 2023 at the behest of the new sponsor. Mission Hills' Dinah Shore Course is currently host of the Galleri Classic, a 78-man, 54-hole no-cut tournament on the PGA Tour Champions for players over 50.

Shore was the first female member of the Hillcrest Country Club in Los Angeles.

In acknowledgment of her contributions to golf, Shore was elected an honorary member of the LPGA Hall of Fame in 1994. Shore became a member of the World Golf Hall of Fame when it absorbed the LPGA Hall in 1998. She received the 1993 Old Tom Morris Award from the Golf Course Superintendents Association of America, GCSAA's highest honor.

In 1963, she hired mid-century modern architect Donald Wexler to design her home in Palm Springs. The house was sold to actor Leonardo DiCaprio in 2014 for almost $5.5 million.

== Death ==
In the spring of 1993, Shore was diagnosed with ovarian cancer. She died of complications from the disease at her home in Beverly Hills, California, on February 24, 1994. Her body was cremated the same day. Some of the ashes were interred in two memorial sites: the Hillside Memorial Park Cemetery in Culver City, California, and Forest Lawn Cemetery (Cathedral City). Other ashes went to relatives.

== Tributes ==
A street named after Shore runs through the towns of Palm Springs, Cathedral City and Rancho Mirage, California. Her hometown of Winchester, Tennessee, honored her with Dinah Shore Boulevard. In 1989, she received the Golden Plate Award of the American Academy of Achievement. In 1991, she was inducted into the Television Hall of Fame. In 1996, a Golden Palm Star on the Palm Springs Walk of Stars was dedicated to her.

== Discography ==
Studio albums

- NBC's Chamber Music Society of Lower Basin Street (1941, RCA Victor Records 78 Set P-56 three-record set)
- Musical Orchids (1943, RCA Victor Records 78 rpm four-record set)
- Gershwin Show Hits (1945, RCA Victor Records 78 rpm three-record set)
- Reminiscing with Dinah Shore (1947, Columbia 78 rpm four-record set)
- Bongo from Walt Disney (1947, Columbia Records 78 rpm three-record set)
- A Date with Dinah (1948, Columbia Records 78 rpm four-record set)
- The Blue Velvet Voice of Dinah Shore (1948, Victor 78 rpm five-record set)
- Dinah Shore Sings (1949, Columbia 10-inch)
- Torch Songs (1950, Columbia Set D-1 10-inch)
- Dinah Shore & Sidney Bechet ~ Lower Basin Street (1950, RCA Victor 78 Set P-56 four-record set)
- The King and I (1951, RCA Victor 10-inch)
- Dinah Shore ~ Lower Basin Street Volume 2 (1951, RCA Victor 78 rpm four-record set)
- Dinah Shore Sings the Blues (1953, RCA Victor 10-inch)
- Call Me Madam Original Cast (1953, RCA Victor 10-inch)
- The Dinah Shore TV Show (1954, RCA 10", 1955, RCA Victor 12-inch)
- Holding Hands at Midnight (1955, RCA Victor)
- Bouquet of Blues (1956, RCA Victor)
- Call Me Madam Original Cast (1956, RCA Victor)
- Dinah Shore Sings Porter and Rodgers (1957, Harmony)
- Love Songs (1958, Harmony)
- General Motors 50th Anniversary Show (1958, RCA Victor)
- Moments Like These (1958, RCA Victor)
- Dinah, Yes Indeed! (1959, Capitol)
- Lower Basin Street (1959, RCA Camden)
- I'm Your Girl (1959, RCA Camden)
- Lavender Blue (1959, Harmony)
- Somebody Loves Me (1959, Capitol)
- Dinah Sings Some Blues with Red (1960, Capitol)
- Vivacious (1960, RCA Camden)
- Buttons and Bows (1960, Harmony)
- Dinah Sings, Previn Plays (1961, Capitol)
- Dinah Down Home! (1962, Capitol)
- The Fabulous Hits of Dinah Shore (1962, Capitol)
- My Very Best to You (1963, Capitol)
- Lower Basin Street Revisited (1965, Reprise)
- Songs for Sometime Losers (1967, Project 3)
- Country Feelin' (1969, Decca)
- Once Upon A Summertime (1975, Stanyan)
- Dinah! (1976, Capitol)
- Dinah!: I've Got a Song (1979, CTW/Sesame Street)

== Filmography ==
- Thank Your Lucky Stars (1943) – Herself
- Up in Arms (1944) – Virginia
- Follow the Boys (1944) – Herself
- Belle of the Yukon (1944) – Lettie Candless
- Make Mine Music (1946) – Narrator (voice)
- Till the Clouds Roll By (1946) – Julia Sanderson / Dinah Shore
- Fun and Fancy Free (1947) – Narrator (voice)
- Bongo (1947) (short subject) – Narrator (voice)
- Aaron Slick from Punkin Crick (1952) – Josie Berry
- A Great New Star (1952) (short subject)
- Screen Snapshots: Hollywood Stars on Parade (1954) (short subject)
- Screen Snapshots: Hollywood Small Fry (1956) (short subject)
- Premier Khrushchev in the USA (1959) (documentary)
- Oh, God! (1977) – Herself (cameo)
- HealtH (1980) – Herself (cameo)

== Television ==
- The Dinah Shore Chevy Show (11/27/1951 – 7/18/1957) (15 minutes)
- The Dinah Shore Chevy Show (10/5/1956 – 6/14/1957) (60-minute monthly specials)
- The Dinah Shore Chevy Show (10/20/1957 – 6/26/1961) (60 minutes)
- The Danny Thomas Show (episodes: "The Dinah Shore Show", 10/28/1957; "Dinah Shore and Danny are Rivals", 12/8/1958)
- The Ed Sullivan Show – Season 18, episode 20 (1/30/1960)
- The Dinah Shore Special (10/6/1961 – 5/12/1963) (60-minute monthly specials)
- The Dinah Shore Special (2/15/1965)
- The Dinah Shore Special: Like Hep (4/13/1969)
- Here's Lucy, "Someone's on the Ski Lift with Dinah" (10/25/1971)
- Dinah's Place (8/3/1970 – 7/26/1974)
- Rowan & Martin's Laugh-In – Season 4, episode 21 (2/8/1971; guest appearance as herself)
- Hold That Pose (1971) (one-week pilot for series)
- Dinah in Search of the Ideal Man (11/18/1973)
- Dinah! (9/9/1974 – 9/7/1979)
- Mary Hartman, Mary Hartman (April 1976; guest appearance as herself)
- Dinah and Her New Best Friends (6/5 – 7/31/1976) (summer series)
- The Carol Burnett Show – Episode 1002 (11/13/1976; guest star)
- The Tonight Show Starring Johnny Carson (11/10/1977)
- Dinah and Friends (9/10/1979 – 9/5/1980)
- Death Car on the Freeway (1979) - Made for Television Movie
- Alice (episode: "Mel's in the Kitchen with Dinah", 11/18/1979; guest appearance as herself)
- Hotel (episode: "Past Tense", 1987) (as Katherine Woodbridge
- Pee-wee's Playhouse Christmas Special (guest star 1988)
- Murder, She Wrote (episode: "Alma Murder", 1989) (as Emily Dyers) (final television appearance)
- A Conversation with Dinah (1989–1991)
- Dinah Comes Home (1991)

== Radio appearances ==
Year	Program	Episode/source
1939	Ben Bernie's Orchestra	
1939–40	The Dinah Shore Show	
1940	The Chamber Music Society of Lower Basin Street	
1940	The Revuers	
1940–42	Time to Smile	
1941–42	Songs by Dinah Shore	
1942–43	In Person, Dinah Shore	
1943–46	The Bird's Eye Open House	
1943	Paul Whiteman Presents	
1945	Screen Guild Players	Belle of the Yukon
1946–47	The Ford Show	
1948	Call for Music	
1952	Suspense	Episode: "Frankie and Johnny"
1953–55	The Dinah Shore Show	

== See also ==
- Club Skirts Dinah Shore Weekend
- ANA Inspiration
