= Frank Sinatra =

American singer and actor (1915–1998)

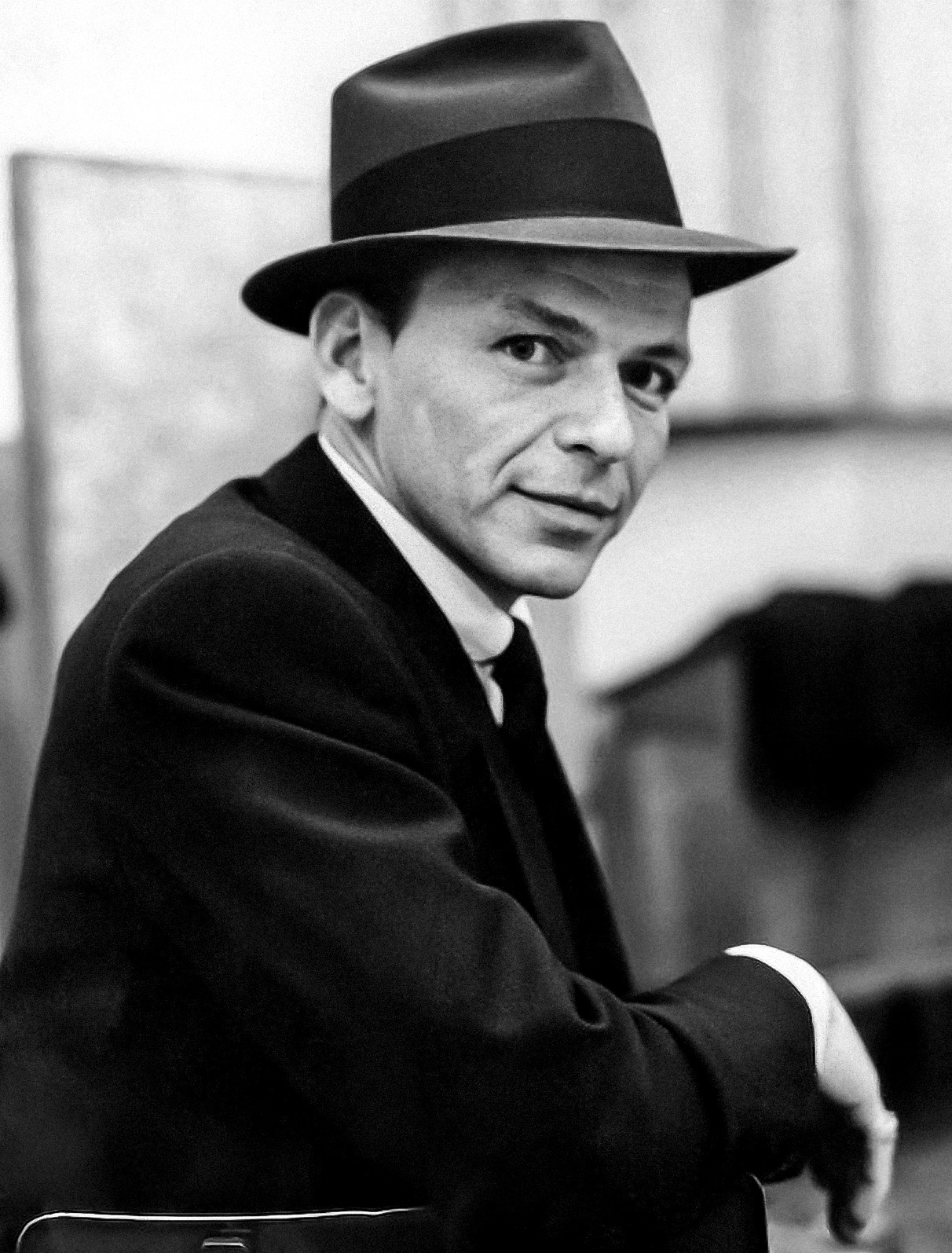
- Sinatra in 1957
- Born: Francis Albert Sinatra; December 12, 1915; Hoboken, New Jersey, US
- Died: May 14, 1998 (aged 82); Los Angeles, California, US
- Resting place: Desert Memorial Park
- Occupations: Singer; actor; activist
- Years active: 1935–1995
- Works: Discography; songs; filmography
- Spouses: Nancy Barbato (m. 1939; div. 1951) Ava Gardner (m. 1951; div. 1957) Mia Farrow (m. 1966; div. 1968) Barbara Marx (m. 1976)
- Children: Nancy; Frank Jr.; Tina
- Parents: Anthony Martin Sinatra; Dolly Sinatra
- Relatives: AJ Lambert (granddaughter)
- Awards: Full list
- Musical career
- Genres: Traditional pop; easy listening; jazz; swing; big band
- Instrument: Vocals
- Labels: RCA Victor; Columbia; Capitol; Reprise; Warner Bros.
- Formerly of: Rat Pack

Francis Albert Sinatra (/sɪˈnɑːtrə/; December 12, 1915 – May 14, 1998) was an American singer, conductor, and actor. Nicknamed the "Chairman of the Board" and "Ol' Blue Eyes", he is regarded as one of the most influential entertainers of the 20th century.

Born at home to Italian immigrants in Hoboken, New Jersey, Sinatra began his musical career in the swing era. He joined the Harry James band as the vocalist in 1939 before signing with Columbia Records four years later and becoming the idol of the "bobby soxers". In 1946, Sinatra released his debut album, The Voice of Frank Sinatra. He then signed with Capitol Records and released several albums with arrangements by Nelson Riddle, notably In the Wee Small Hours (1955) and Songs for Swingin' Lovers! (1956). In 1960, Sinatra left Capitol Records to start his own record label, Reprise Records, releasing a string of successful albums. He collaborated with Count Basie on Sinatra-Basie: An Historic Musical First (1962) and It Might as Well Be Swing (1964). In 1965, he recorded September of My Years and starred in the Emmy-winning television special Frank Sinatra: A Man and His Music.

After releasing Sinatra at the Sands in 1966, Sinatra recorded one of his most famous collaborations with Tom Jobim, Francis Albert Sinatra & Antonio Carlos Jobim. It was followed by 1968's Francis A. & Edward K. with Duke Ellington. Sinatra retired in 1971 following the release of "My Way" but came out of retirement two years later. He recorded several albums and released "New York, New York" in 1980. Sinatra is among the world's best-selling music artists, with an estimated 150 million record sales globally.

Sinatra also forged a highly successful acting career. After winning the Academy Award for Best Supporting Actor for From Here to Eternity (1953), he starred in The Man with the Golden Arm (1955) and The Manchurian Candidate (1962). Sinatra also appeared in musicals such as On the Town (1949); Guys and Dolls (1955); High Society (1956); and Pal Joey (1957), the last of which won him a Golden Globe Award. Toward the end of his career, Sinatra frequently played detectives, including the title character in Tony Rome (1967) and the titular The Detective (1968). He received the Golden Globe Cecil B. DeMille Award in 1971. Sinatra also directed the anti-war drama None but the Brave (1965). On television, The Frank Sinatra Show began on CBS in 1950, and Sinatra continued to make appearances on television throughout the 1950s and 1960s.

Sinatra was recognized at the Kennedy Center Honors in 1983, awarded the Presidential Medal of Freedom in 1985, and received the Congressional Gold Medal in 1997. He earned 13 Grammy Awards, including the Grammy Trustees Award, Grammy Legend Award, and the Grammy Lifetime Achievement Award. American music critic Robert Christgau called Sinatra "the greatest singer of the 20th century" and he continues to be regarded as an iconic figure.

== Early life ==
They'd fought through his childhood and continued to do so until her dying day. But I believe that to counter her steel will he'd developed his own. To prove her wrong when she belittled his choice of career ... Their friction first had shaped him; that, I think, had remained to the end and a litmus test of the grit in his bones. It helped keep him at the top of his game.

— Sinatra's daughter Nancy on the importance of his mother Dolly in his life and character.

Francis Albert Sinatra (Note: On his original birth certificate, Sinatra's name was recorded incorrectly as "Frank Sinestro", a clerical error. In May 1945, he officially corrected the name on his birth certificate to "Francis A. Sinatra".) was born on December 12, 1915, in a tenement at 415 Monroe Street in Hoboken, New Jersey, (Note: The house at 415 Monroe Street burned down and no longer exists. The site is marked by a brick archway with a bronze plaque on the sidewalk that reads, "Francis Albert Sinatra: The Voice". The building at 417 Monroe Street has a "From Here to Eternity", sign with images of an Oscar statue. It was opened as a museum by Ed Shirak in 2001, but closed after five years because of maintenance issues.) the only child of Italian immigrants Natalina "Dolly" Garaventa and Antonino Martino "Marty" Sinatra. (Note: Other sources incorrectly say Catania.) His mother was from Genoa, Liguria, while his father was from Lercara Friddi, Sicily. Sinatra weighed 13.5 pounds (6.1 kg) at birth and had to be delivered with the aid of forceps, which caused severe scarring to his left cheek, neck, and lifelong damage to his left eardrum, delaying his baptism to April 2, 1916. A childhood operation left major scarring on his neck, and during adolescence, Sinatra was further scarred by cystic acne. His excessively skinny frame as a child and young man later became the subject of jokes during stage shows. He was raised in the Catholic Church.

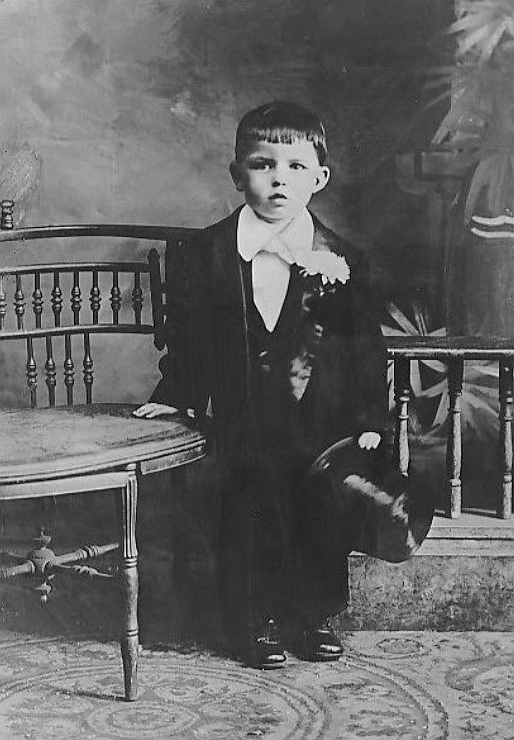
Sinatra at age three, c. 1918–1919

Sinatra's mother, Dolly, was energetic and driven; biographers believe that she was the dominant factor in the development of her son's personality and self-confidence. Sinatra's fourth wife, Barbara, would later claim that Dolly "knocked him around a lot" when he was a child. Dolly became influential in Hoboken and in local Democratic Party circles. During the Great Depression, Dolly provided money to her son for outings with friends and to buy expensive clothes, resulting in neighbors describing him as the "best-dressed kid in the neighborhood".

Sinatra's illiterate father, Marty, was a bantamweight boxer who later worked at the Hoboken Fire Department, working his way up to captain. Due to his illiteracy, Marty stressed the importance of a "complete and full" education and had instilled in his son the desire to become a civil engineer and enroll at Stevens Institute of Technology in Hoboken. Sinatra spent much time at his parents' tavern in Hoboken, (Note: In 1920, Prohibition of alcohol became law in the US. Dolly and Marty ran a tavern during those years, allowed to operate openly by local officials who refused to enforce the law.) working on his homework and occasionally singing for spare change.

At a young age, Sinatra developed an interest in music, particularly big band jazz and listened to Gene Austin, Rudy Vallée, Russ Colombo, and Bob Eberly while idolizing Bing Crosby. For his 15th birthday, Sinatra received a ukulele from his uncle Domenico, with which he performed at family gatherings. Sinatra attended David E. Rue Jr. High School from 1928, and A. J. Demarest High School (since renamed Hoboken High School) in 1931, where he arranged bands for school dances, but left without graduating after having attended only 47 days before being expelled for "general rowdiness".

To please his mother, Sinatra enrolled at Drake Business School, but departed after 11 months. Dolly found him working as a delivery boy at the Jersey Observer newspaper (since merged into The Jersey Journal), where his godfather Frank Garrick worked; (Note: Sinatra's loss of employment at the newspaper led to a life-long rift with Garrick. Dolly said of it, "My son is like me. You cross him, he never forgets.") Sinatra later worked as a riveter at the Tietjen and Lang shipyard. He began performing in local Hoboken social clubs and sang for free on radio stations such as WAAT in Jersey City.

== Music career ==
=== 1935–1942: Career beginnings ===
==== Hoboken Four and Harry James ====
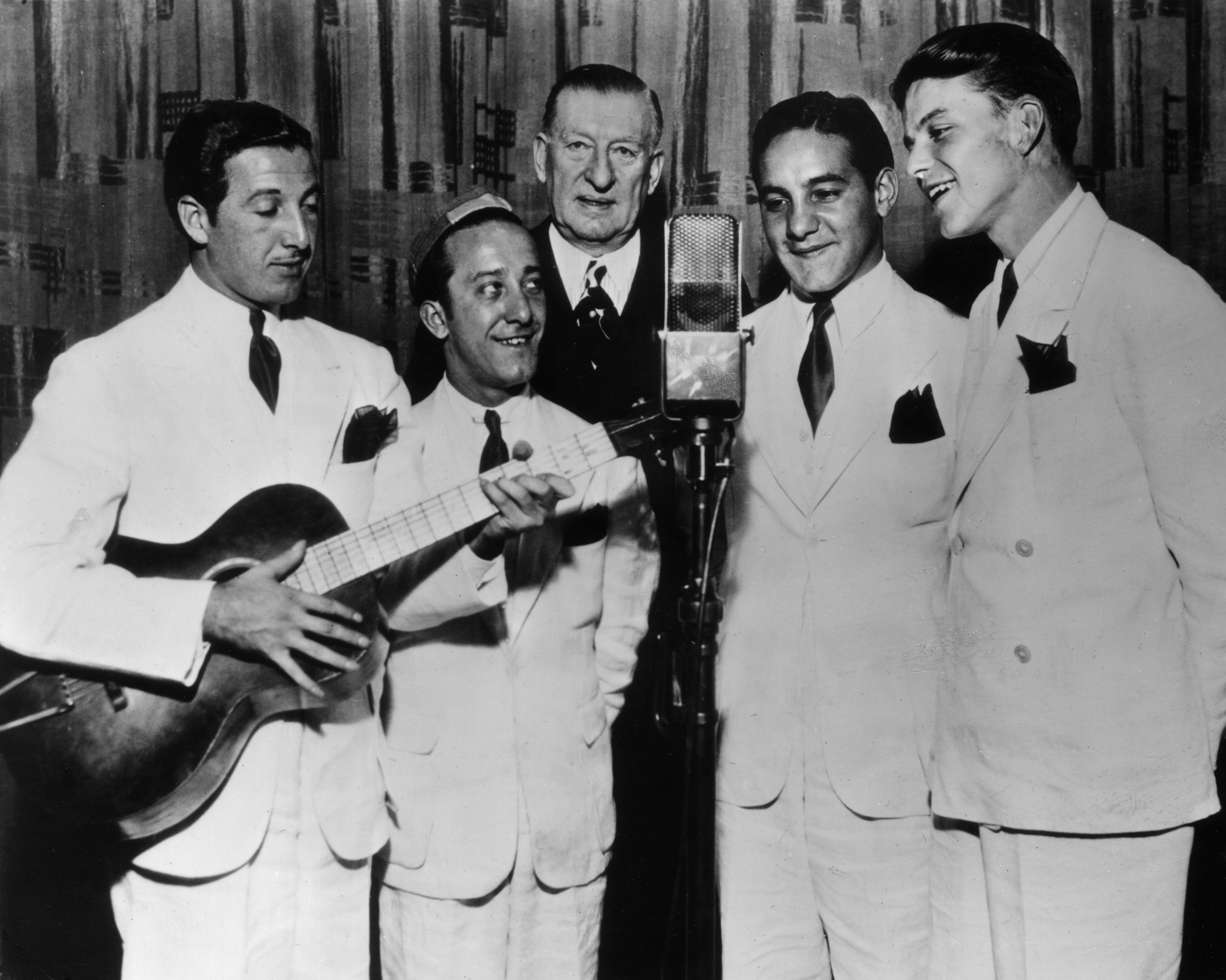
Sinatra (far right) with the Hoboken Four on Major Bowes' Amateur Hour in 1935

Sinatra began singing professionally as a teenager. He never learned to read music but learned by ear. Sinatra got his first break in 1935 when his mother persuaded a local singing group called the 3 Flashes, who were auditioning for the Major Bowes Amateur Hour show, to let him join. Baritone Fred Tamburro stated, "Frank hung around us like we were gods or something", admitting that they took him on board only because he owned a car (Note: Nancy Sinatra notes that he owned a Chrysler and people would show amazement that such a young kid could afford it.) and could chauffeur the group.

The group became the "Hoboken Four" and passed an audition from Major Bowes to appear on the show. They each earned $12.50, and attracted 40,000 votes to win first prize—a six-month contract to perform on stage and radio across the U.S. Sinatra quickly became the group's lead singer, and, much to the jealousy of his fellow group members, garnered most of the attention from the girls. (Note: The jealousy exhibited by the group members often led to brawls in which they would beat up the small, skinny young Sinatra.) Due to the success of the group, Bowes kept asking for them to return, disguised under different names, varying from "The Secaucus Cockamamies" to "The Bayonne Bacalas," although this may be apocryphal, sourced from Sinatra's humorous stage patter during his appearance with the Count Basie orchestra at the Sands (1966).

In March 1939, saxophone player Frank Mane, who knew Sinatra from Jersey City radio station WAAT, arranged for him to audition and record "Our Love", his first solo studio recording. (Note: Only one copy of this recording was made, a 78 rpm disc. Mane wrote "Frank Sinatra" on the record label and kept the recording in a drawer through the years, giving Sinatra a copy on a cassette tape as a gift in 1979. Mane died in 1998, only months after Sinatra's death; in 2006, Mane's widow offered the recording for sale through Gurnsey's auction house in New York.) In June, bandleader Harry James, who had heard Sinatra sing on "Dance Parade", signed him to a two-year contract of $75 a week after a show at the Paramount Theatre in New York. (Note: The only sticking point was that James wanted Sinatra to change his name to Frankie Satin, as he thought that Sinatra sounded too Italian. Neither Sinatra nor his mother would agree to this; he told James that his cousin, Ray Sinatra, was a bandleader in Boston, kept his own name and was doing well with it. James actually knew Ray Sinatra, so he did not press the issue.) It was with the James band that Sinatra released his first commercial record "From the Bottom of My Heart" in July. No more than 8,000 copies were sold, and further records released with James through 1939, such as "All or Nothing at All", also had weak sales on their initial release. Thanks to his vocal training, Sinatra could now sing two tones higher, and developed a repertoire that included songs such as "My Buddy", "Willow Weep for Me", "It's Funny to Everyone but Me", "Here Comes the Night", "On a Little Street in Singapore", "Ciribiribin", and "Every Day of My Life".

Sinatra became increasingly frustrated with the Harry James band, feeling that he was not achieving the major success and acclaim he was looking for. Sinatra's pianist and close friend Hank Sanicola persuaded him to stay with the group, but Sinatra left James in November 1939 to replace Jack Leonard (Note: the vocalist, not to be confused with the comedian Jack E. Leonard.) as the lead singer of the Tommy Dorsey band. Sinatra earned $125 a week, appearing at the Palmer House in Chicago, and James released Sinatra from his contract. (Note: Sinatra acknowledged his debt to James throughout his life, and upon hearing of James' death in 1983, stated: "he is the one that made it all possible.")

==== Tommy Dorsey band ====
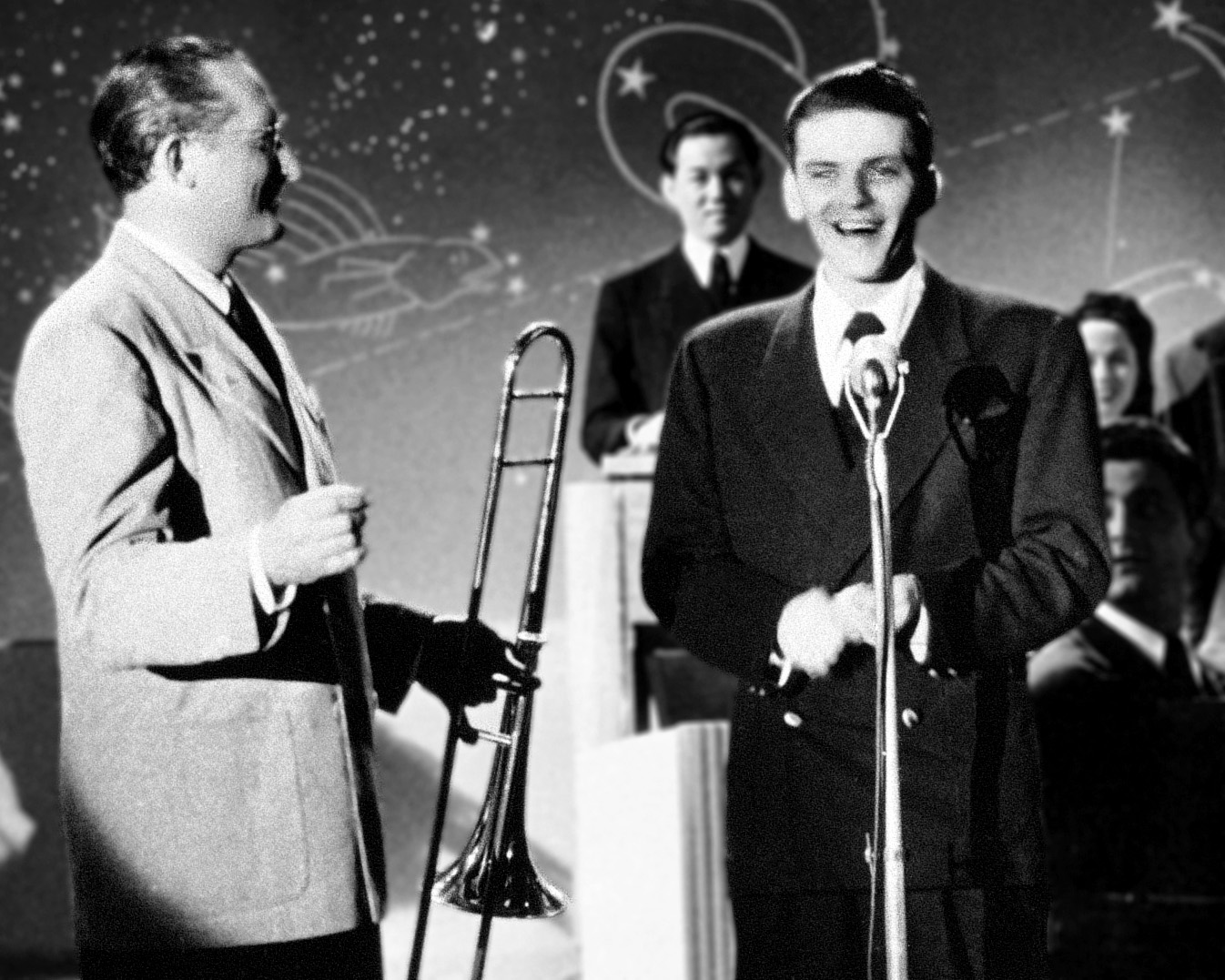
Sinatra and Tommy Dorsey in Ship Ahoy (1942)

On January 26, 1940, Sinatra made his first public appearance with the band at the Coronado Theatre in Rockford, Illinois, opening the show with "Stardust". Dorsey recalled the excitement from the audience when Sinatra got up to sing, which caused him to "almost forget to take [his] own solos".

Dorsey was a major influence on Sinatra and became a father figure. Sinatra copied Dorsey's mannerisms and traits, becoming a demanding perfectionist like him, even adopting his hobby of toy trains. Sinatra asked Dorsey to be godfather to his daughter Nancy in June 1940. Sinatra later said that "The only two people I've ever been afraid of are my mother and Tommy Dorsey." Sinatra and drummer Buddy Rich were friends and even roommates when the band was on the road, but professional jealousy surfaced as both men wanted to be considered the star of Dorsey's band. Later, Sinatra helped Rich form his own band with a $25,000 loan and provided financial help to Rich during times of the drummer's serious illness.

In his first year with Tommy Dorsey, Sinatra recorded more than 40 songs. His first vocal hit was the song "Polka Dots and Moonbeams" in late April 1940. Two more chart appearances followed with "Say It" and "Imagination", which was Sinatra's first top-10 hit. His fourth chart appearance (and his first on the first officially published Billboard chart) was "I'll Never Smile Again", topping the charts for twelve weeks beginning in mid-July. Other records with Dorsey issued by RCA Victor include "Our Love Affair" in 1940; "Oh! Look at Me Now" and "This Love of Mine" in 1941; "Take Me", and "There Are Such Things" in 1942; and "It Started All Over Again" and "It's Always You" in 1943.

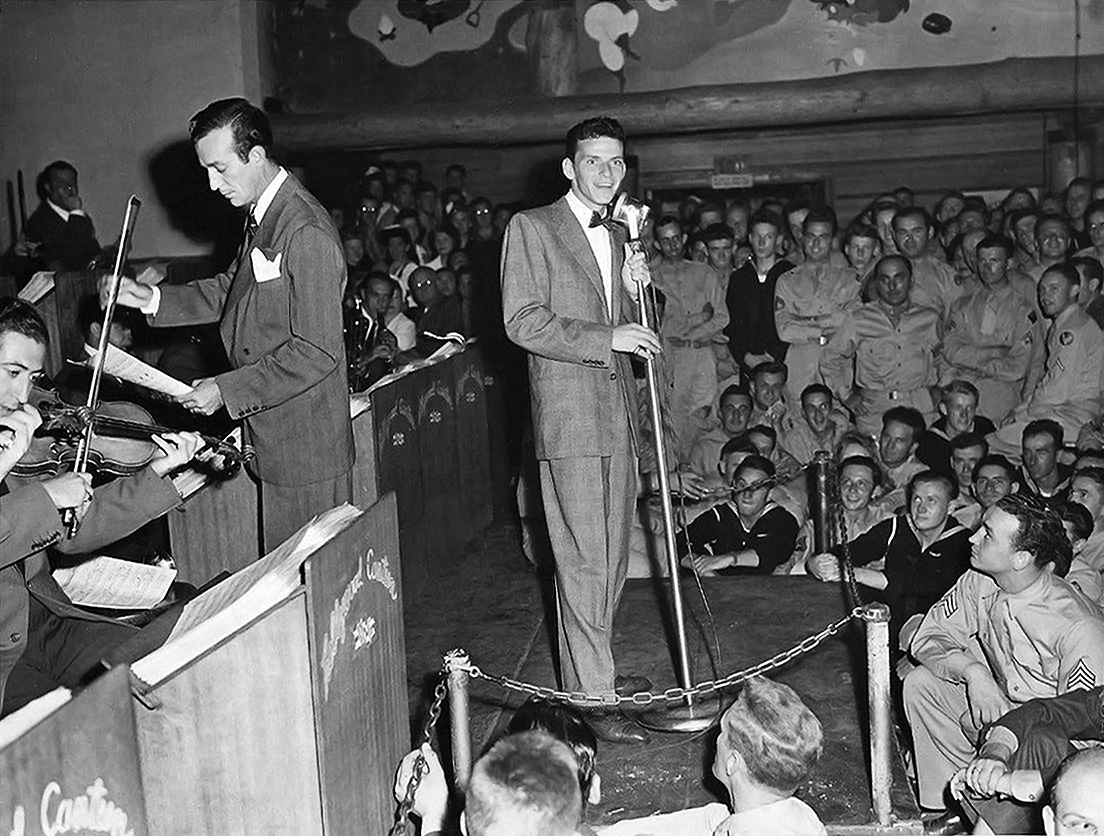
Sinatra performing with Harry James at the Hollywood Canteen in 1943

As his success and popularity grew, Sinatra pushed Dorsey to allow him to record some solo songs. Dorsey eventually relented, and on January 19, 1942, Sinatra recorded "Night and Day", "The Night We Called It a Day", "The Song is You", and "Lamplighter's Serenade" at a Bluebird recording session, with Axel Stordahl as arranger and conductor. After the 1942 recordings, Sinatra believed that he needed to go solo, with an insatiable desire to compete with Bing Crosby, (Note: Sinatra said: "The reason I wanted to leave Tommy's band was that Crosby was Number One, way up on top of the pile. In the open field, you might say, were some awfully good singers with the orchestras. Bob Eberly (with Jimmy Dorsey) was a fabulous vocalist. Mr. Como (with Ted Weems) is such a wonderful singer. I thought if I don't make a move out of this and try to do it on my own soon, one of those guys will do it, and I'll have to fight all three of them to get a position".) but Sinatra was hampered by his contract which gave Dorsey 43% of Sinatra's lifetime earnings. A legal battle ensued, eventually settled in August 1942. (Note: Sinatra's lawyer, Henry Jaffe, met with Dorsey's lawyer N. Joseph Ross in Los Angeles in August 1943. In the words of Kelley: "In the end, MCA, an agency representing Dorsey and courting Sinatra, made Dorsey a $60,000 offer, which he accepted. To obtain Frank as a client, the agency paid Dorsey $35,000 while Sinatra paid $25,000, which he borrowed from Manie Sacks as an advance against his royalties from Columbia Records. MCA agreed that until 1948, it would split its commissions on Sinatra with GAC, the agency Frank had signed with when he left the Dorsey band." However, during a 1979 concert at the Universal Amphitheatre in Los Angeles, Sinatra said that it took him years to escape the contract and that Dorsey had cost him 7 million dollars.) On September 3, 1942, Dorsey bade farewell to Sinatra, reportedly saying, "I hope you fall on your ass", but he was more gracious on the air when replacing Sinatra with singer Dick Haymes.

Rumors began spreading in newspapers that Sinatra's mobster godfather, Willie Moretti, coerced Dorsey at gunpoint to let Sinatra out of his contract for a few thousand dollars. (Note: The incident started rumors of Sinatra's involvement with the Mafia and was fictionalized in the book and film The Godfather.) Sinatra persuaded Stordahl to come with him and become his personal arranger, offering him $650 a month, five times his salary from Dorsey. Dorsey and Sinatra, who had been very close, never reconciled their differences.

=== 1942–1948: Established solo singer ===
==== Onset of Sinatramania ====
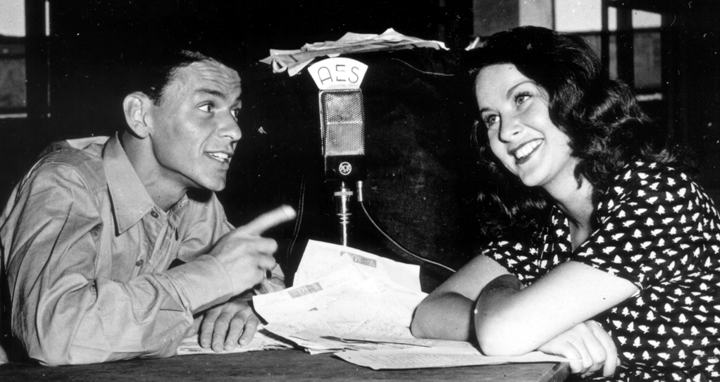
Sinatra with Alida Valli, c. 1940s

By May 1941, Sinatra topped the male singer polls in Billboard and DownBeat magazines. His appeal to bobby soxers, a subculture of teenage girls, revealed a new audience for popular music, which had previously been recorded mainly for adults. The phenomenon became known as "Sinatramania" after his opening at the Paramount Theatre in New York on December 30, 1942.

According to Nancy Sinatra, Jack Benny later said, "I thought the goddamned building was going to cave in. I never heard such a commotion ... All this for a fellow I never heard of." Sinatra performed for four weeks at the theatre, his act following the Benny Goodman orchestra, after which his contract was renewed for another four weeks by Bob Weitman due to his popularity. Sinatra became known as "Swoonatra" or "The Voice", and his fans "Sinatratics". They organized meetings and sent masses of letters of adoration, and within a few weeks of the show, some 1,000 Sinatra fan clubs had been reported across the US.

Sinatra's publicist, George Evans, encouraged interviews and photographs with fans and was the man responsible for depicting Sinatra as a vulnerable, shy, Italian–American with a rough childhood who made good. When Sinatra returned to the Paramount in October 1944, only 250 persons left the first show, and 35,000 fans left outside caused a near riot, known as the Columbus Day Riot, outside the venue because they were not allowed in. Such was the bobby-soxer devotion to Sinatra that they were known to write his song titles on their clothing, bribe hotel maids for an opportunity to touch his bed, and steal clothing Sinatra was wearing.

==== Role in World War II ====
Sinatra did not serve in the military during World War II. However, Army files reported that Sinatra had actually been rejected because he was "not acceptable material from a psychiatric viewpoint." Sinatra's emotional instability was hidden to avoid "undue unpleasantness for both the selectee and the induction service". Rumors reported by columnist Walter Winchell stated that Sinatra paid $40,000 to avoid military service, but the FBI found this to be without merit.

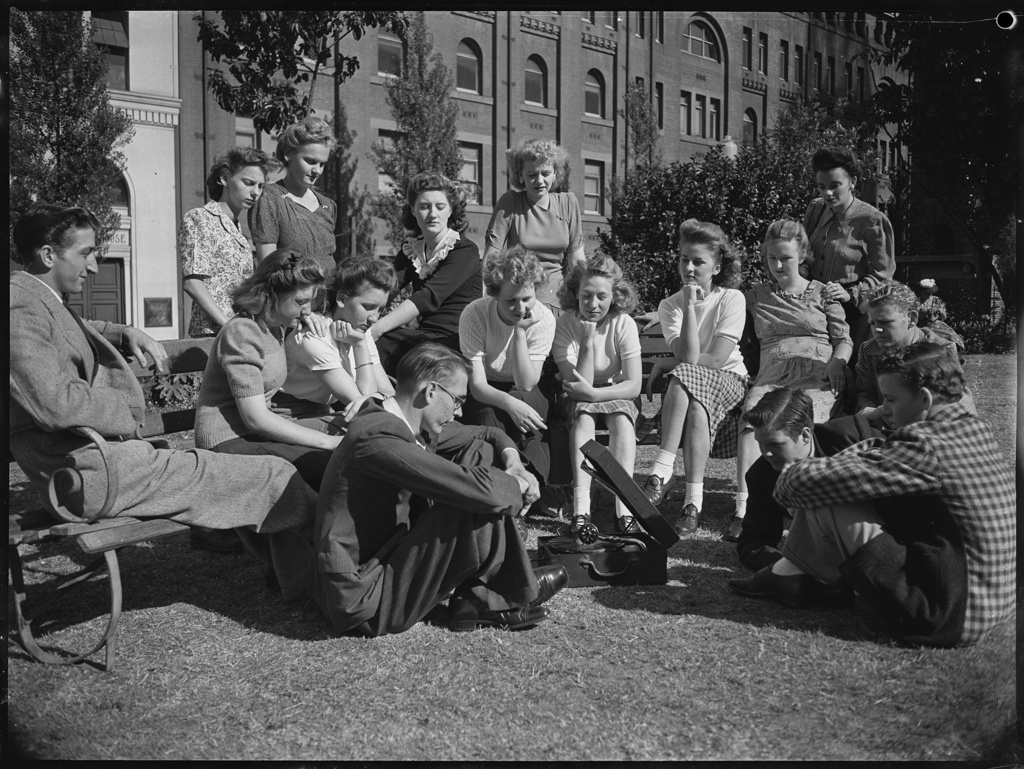
Young Sinatra fans listening to his records on a portable gramophone in Sydney, Australia, 1945

Toward the end of the war, Sinatra entertained the troops during several successful overseas USO tours with comedian Phil Silvers. Sinatra worked frequently with the popular Andrews Sisters in radio in the 1940s, and many USO shows were broadcast to troops via the Armed Forces Radio Service (AFRS). In 1944, he released "I Couldn't Sleep a Wink Last Night" as a single and recorded his own version of Irving Berlin's "White Christmas". The following year, Sinatra released "I Dream of You (More Than You Dream I Do)", "Saturday Night (Is the Loneliest Night of the Week)", "Dream", and "Nancy (with the Laughing Face)" as singles.

==== Signing with Columbia Records ====
Sinatra signed with Columbia Records as a solo artist on June 1, 1943, during the 1942–44 musicians' strike. Columbia Records re-released Harry James and Sinatra's August 1939 version of "All or Nothing at All", which reached number 2 on June 2 and was on the best-selling list for 18 weeks. Sinatra initially had great success, and performed on the radio on Your Hit Parade from February 1943 until December 1944.

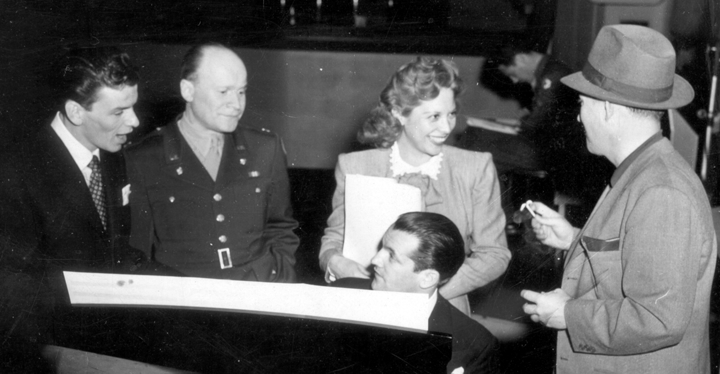
Sinatra (left) on the Armed Forces Radio in 1944 with Dinah Shore and Bing Crosby (right)

Columbia wanted new recordings of their growing star as quickly as possible, so Alec Wilder was hired as an arranger and conductor for several sessions with a vocal group called the Bobby Tucker Singers. Of the nine songs recorded during these sessions, seven charted on the best-selling list. That year he made his first solo nightclub appearance at New York's Riobamba, and a successful concert in the Wedgewood Room of the prestigious Waldorf-Astoria New York that year secured his popularity in New York high society. Sinatra released "You'll Never Know", "Close to You", "Sunday, Monday, or Always" and "People Will Say We're in Love" as singles. By the end of 1943, he was more popular in a DownBeat poll than Bing Crosby.

Despite being very politically active in 1945 and 1946, Sinatra sang on 160 radio shows, recorded 36 times, and shot four films in those two years. By 1946, he was performing on stage up to 45 times a week, singing up to 100 songs daily, and earning up to $93,000 a week.

In 1946, Sinatra released "Oh! What it Seemed to Be", "Day by Day", "They Say It's Wonderful", "Five Minutes More", and "The Coffee Song" as singles, and launched his first album, The Voice of Frank Sinatra, which reached No. 1 on the Billboard chart. William Ruhlmann of AllMusic wrote that Sinatra "took the material very seriously, singing the love lyrics with utter seriousness" and that his "singing and the classically influenced settings gave the songs unusual depth of meaning." Sinatra was soon selling 10 million records a year.

Such was Sinatra's command at Columbia that his love of conducting was indulged with the release of the set Frank Sinatra Conducts the Music of Alec Wilder, an offering unlikely to appeal to Sinatra's core fanbase of teenage girls at the time. In 1947, he released his second album, Songs by Sinatra, featuring songs of a similar mood and tempo such as Irving Berlin's "How Deep is the Ocean?" and Harold Arlen's and Jerome Kern's "All The Things You Are". "Mam'selle", composed by Edmund Goulding with lyrics by Mack Gordon for the film The Razor's Edge (1946), was released as a single.

Sinatra had competition; versions by Art Lund, Dick Haymes, Dennis Day, and The Pied Pipers also reached the top ten of the Billboard charts. In December, Sinatra recorded "Sweet Lorraine" with the Metronome All-Stars, featuring talented jazz musicians such as Coleman Hawkins, Harry Carney and Charlie Shavers, with Nat King Cole on piano, in what Charles L. Granata describes as "one of the highlights of Sinatra's Columbia epoch". Sinatra's third album, Christmas Songs by Sinatra, was originally released in 1948 as a 78 rpm album set, and a 10" LP record was released two years later.

=== 1948–1952: Career slump ===
When Sinatra was featured as a priest in The Miracle of the Bells, due to press negativity surrounding his Mafia connections at the time, (Note: Sinatra was spotted in Havana in 1946 with mobster Lucky Luciano, which started a series of negative press articles, implicating Sinatra with the Mafia. In 1947, he was involved in a violent incident with journalist Lee Mortimer, who had written some of the most scathing articles on his alleged connections. Kelley says that his articles grew so offensive that Sinatra pounced on him outside Ciro's and punched him behind the left ear in response to an insult in which he was called a "dago". Sinatra was taken to court, and according to Kelley, Mortimer received Mafia threats to drop the case or lose his life.) it was announced that Sinatra would donate his $100,000 in wages from the film to the Catholic Church. By the end of 1948, Sinatra had slipped to fourth on DownBeat's annual poll of most popular singers, and the following year, he was pushed out of the top spots in polls for the first time since 1943. Frankly Sentimental (1949) was panned by DownBeat, who commented that "for all his talent, it seldom comes to life."

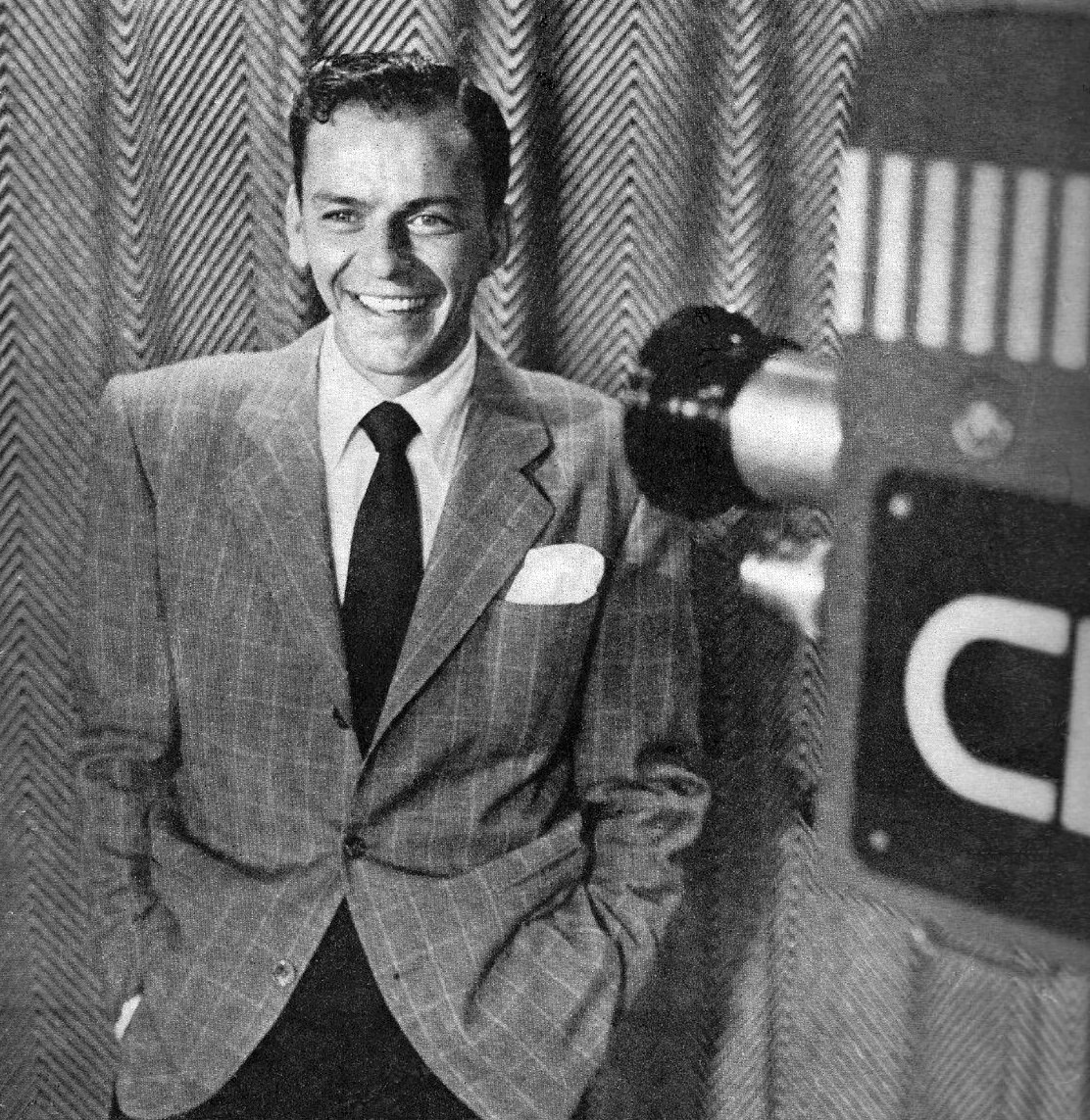
Sinatra in November 1950

Although "The Hucklebuck" reached the top ten, it was his last single release under the Columbia label. Sinatra's last two albums with Columbia, Dedicated to You and Sing and Dance with Frank Sinatra, were released in 1950. He would later feature a number of the Sing and Dance with Frank Sinatra album's songs, including "Lover", "It's Only a Paper Moon", and "It All Depends on You", on his 1961 Capitol release, Sinatra's Swingin' Session!!!.

Culminating the low of Sinatra's career was the death of publicist George Evans in January 1950. According to Jimmy Van Heusen, Sinatra's close friend and songwriter, Evans' death to him was "an enormous shock which defies words", as he had been crucial to Sinatra's career and popularity with the "bobby soxers".

Sinatra's reputation continued to decline as reports broke in February of his affair with Ava Gardner and the destruction of his marriage to Nancy, although Sinatra insisted that his marriage had long been over even before meeting Gardner. In April, he was engaged to perform at the Copa club in New York, but had to cancel five days of the booking due to a submucosal hemorrhage of the throat. Evans once said that whenever Sinatra suffered from a bad throat and loss of voice, it was always due to emotional tension, which "absolutely destroyed him".

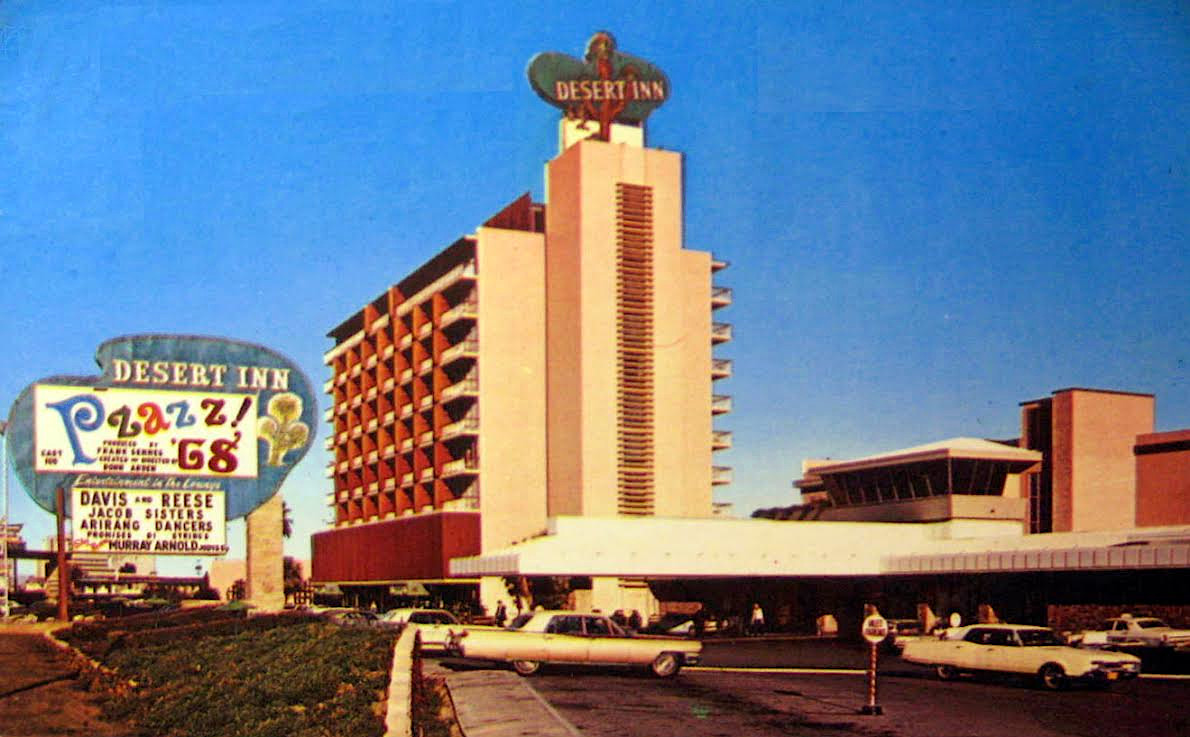
The Desert Inn, Las Vegas, where Sinatra began performing in 1951

In financial difficulty following his divorce and career decline, Sinatra was forced to borrow $200,000 from Columbia to pay his back taxes after MCA refused to front the money. Rejected by Hollywood, Sinatra turned to Las Vegas and made his debut at the Desert Inn in September 1951.

Sinatra's decline in popularity was evident in his concert appearances. At a brief run at the Paramount in New York, Sinatra drew small audiences. At the Desert Inn in Las Vegas, he performed to half-filled houses. At a concert at Chez Paree in Chicago, only 150 people turned up in a 1,200-seat venue. By April 1952, Sinatra was performing at the Kauai County Fair in Hawaii. Sinatra's relationship with Columbia Records was disintegrating, with A&R executive Mitch Miller claiming he "couldn't give away" Sinatra records. (Note: Miller tried to offset Sinatra's declining record sales by introducing "gimmicky novel tunes" in his repertoire, such as "Mama Will Bark" to appeal to younger audiences. "Mama Will Bark" is often cited as the worst of Sinatra's career. Miller thought he would try this novelty approach for Sinatra because he felt his "great records" were not selling. Initially, Sinatra went along with this approach, but eventually, he came to resent Miller for the poor material he was being offered.) However, several notable recordings were made during this time period, such as "If I Could Write a Book" in January 1952, which Granata sees as a "turning point", forecasting his later work with its sensitivity,

Columbia and MCA dropped Sinatra later in 1952. His last studio recording for Columbia, "Why Try To Change Me Now", was recorded in New York on September 17, 1952, with an orchestra arranged and conducted by Percy Faith. Journalist Burt Boyar observed, "Sinatra had had it. It was sad. From the top to the bottom in one horrible lesson."

=== 1953–1960: Career revival ===
==== Signing with Capitol Records ====
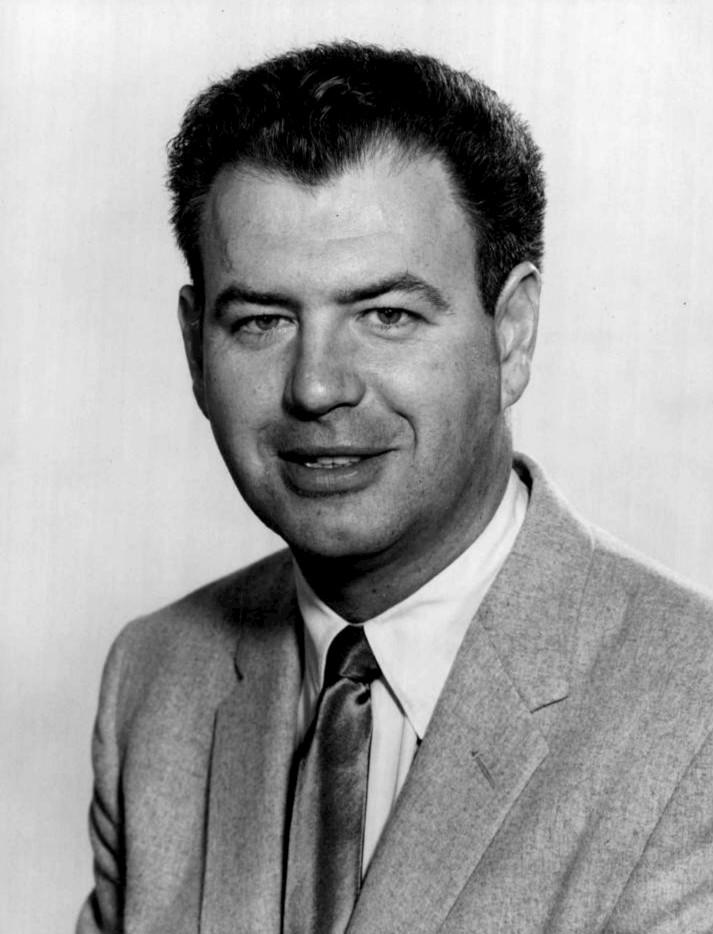
Nelson Riddle, Sinatra's album arranger for Capitol Records

The release of the August 1953 film From Here to Eternity, in which he won the Academy Award for Best Supporting Actor, marked the beginning of a remarkable career revival. Tom Santopietro notes that Sinatra began to bury himself in his work, with an "unparalleled frenetic schedule of recordings, movies and concerts", in what authors Anthony Summers and Robbyn Swan describe as "a new and brilliant phase". On March 13, 1953, Sinatra met with Capitol Records vice president Alan Livingston and signed a seven-year recording contract. Sinatra's first session for Capitol took place at KHJ studios at Studio C, 5515 Melrose Avenue in Los Angeles, with Axel Stordahl conducting. The session produced four recordings, including "I'm Walking Behind You", Sinatra's first Capitol single.

After spending two weeks on location in Hawaii filming From Here to Eternity, Sinatra returned to KHJ on April 30 for his first recording session with Nelson Riddle, an established arranger and conductor at Capitol who was Nat King Cole's musical director. After recording the first song, "I've Got the World on a String", Sinatra offered Riddle a rare expression of praise, "Beautiful!", and after listening to the playbacks, he could not hide his enthusiasm, exclaiming, "I'm back, baby, I'm back!" In subsequent sessions in May and November 1953, Sinatra and Riddle developed and refined their musical collaboration, with Sinatra providing specific guidance on the arrangements. Sinatra's first album for Capitol, Songs for Young Lovers, was released on January 4, 1954, and it included "A Foggy Day", "I Get a Kick Out of You", "My Funny Valentine", "Violets for Your Furs", and "They Can't Take That Away from Me", songs that became staples of his later concerts.

==== Renewed success with Riddle ====
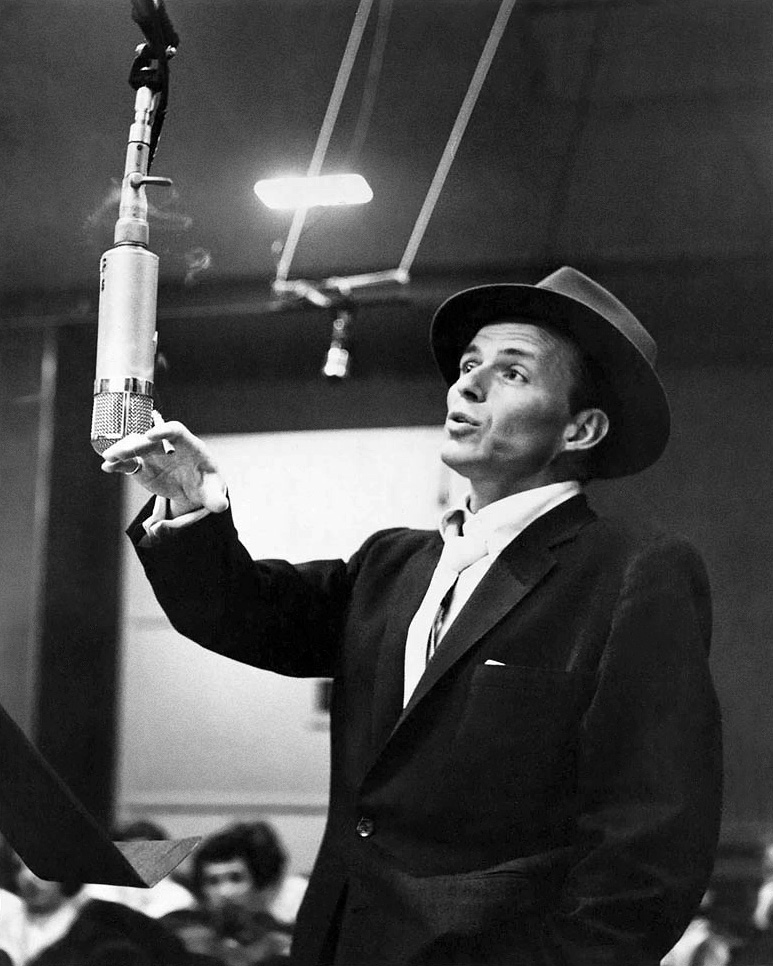
Sinatra recording at Capitol Studios, c. 1955

That same month, Sinatra released the single "Young at Heart", which reached No. 2 and was awarded Song of the Year. (Note: Sinatra was not very enthusiastic about the song initially. His friend, Jimmy Van Heusen, convinced him that the song would be a success. Young at Heart was produced by Day's husband at the time, Marty Melcher, whom Sinatra detested. Their feud grew worse when Melcher suggested that Day sing "Young at Heart" as the film's title song when Sinatra's recording of the song was already a hit—Day conceded that she did not care whose voice was heard singing the film's title song. Because of the rift, the Young at Heart soundtrack album contains all the songs heard in the film but the title Young at Heart. Sinatra's hit recording is heard at the beginning and end of the film.) In March, he recorded and released the single "Three Coins in the Fountain", a "powerful ballad" that reached No. 4. Sinatra's second album with Riddle, Swing Easy!, which reflected his "love for the jazz idiom" according to Granata, was released on August 2 and included "Just One of Those Things", "Taking a Chance on Love", and "All of Me". Swing Easy! was named Album of the Year by Billboard, and Sinatra was named "Favorite Male Vocalist" by Billboard, DownBeat, and Metronome in 1954. Sinatra came to consider Riddle "the greatest arranger in the world."

Sinatra became one of Las Vegas's pioneer residency entertainers, and a prominent figure in the Vegas scene throughout the 1950s and 1960s onwards, a period described by Rojek as the "high-water mark" of Sinatra's "hedonism and self-absorption". Rojek notes that the Rat Pack "provided an outlet for gregarious banter and wisecracks" but argues that it was Sinatra's vehicle, possessing an "unassailable command over the other performers". Sinatra would fly to Las Vegas from Los Angeles in Van Heusen's plane. On October 4, 1953, Sinatra made his first performance at the Sands Hotel and Casino, after an invitation by the manager Jack Entratter. Sinatra typically performed there three times a year and later acquired a share in the hotel. (Note: Sinatra bought a two percent share in the hotel for $54,000. At one point the share reached nine percent. He was reportedly ordered to sell his interest in the Sands in 1963, due to his association with mobster Sam Giancana.)

Songs for Swingin' Lovers! features a recording of "I've Got You Under My Skin," written by Cole Porter, which reportedly took 22 takes to perfect.

In 1955, Sinatra released In the Wee Small Hours, his first 12" LP, featuring songs such as "In the Wee Small Hours of the Morning", "Mood Indigo", "Glad to Be Unhappy" and "When Your Lover Has Gone". According to Granata, it was the first concept album of his to make a "single persuasive statement", with an extended program and "melancholy mood". Sinatra embarked on his first tour of Australia the same year. Another collaboration with Riddle resulted in Songs for Swingin' Lovers!, sometimes seen as one of his best albums, which was released in March 1956. It ranked number 306 on Rolling Stone magazine's list of the 500 greatest albums of all time in 2003, and 308 in 2012 revised list.

Sinatra's February 1956 recording sessions inaugurated the studios at the Capitol Records Building, complete with a 56-piece symphonic orchestra. According to Granata, his recordings of "Night and Day", "Oh! Look at Me Now", and "From This Moment On" revealed "powerful sexual overtones, stunningly achieved through the mounting tension and release of Sinatra's best-teasing vocal lines", while his recording of "River, Stay 'Way from My Door" in April demonstrated his "brilliance as a syncopational improviser". Riddle said that Sinatra took "particular delight" in singing "The Lady is a Tramp", commenting that he "always sang that song with a certain amount of salaciousness", making "cue tricks" with the lyrics. Sinatra's penchant for conducting was displayed again in 1956's Frank Sinatra Conducts Tone Poems of Color, an instrumental album that has been interpreted to be a catharsis to his failed relationship with Gardner. Sinatra also sang at that year's Democratic National Convention and performed with The Dorsey Brothers for a week soon afterward at the Paramount Theatre.

Sinatra introducing his character to the audience in the 1957 trailer for the film Pal Joey

In 1957, Sinatra released Close to You, A Swingin' Affair!, and Where Are You?—his first album in stereo, with Gordon Jenkins. Granata considers "Close to You" to have been thematically his closest concept album to perfection during the "golden" era, and Nelson Riddle's finest work, which was "extremely progressive" by the standards of the day. For Granata, Sinatra's A Swingin' Affair! and Songs for Swingin' Lovers! solidified "Sinatra's image as a 'swinger', from both a musical and visual standpoint." Buddy Collette considered the swing albums to have been heavily influenced by Sammy Davis Jr. and stated that when he worked with Sinatra in the mid-1960s, he approached a song much differently than he had done in the early 1950s. On June 9, 1957, Sinatra performed in a 62-minute concert conducted by Riddle at the Seattle Civic Auditorium, his first appearance in Seattle since 1945. The recording was first released as a bootleg, but Artanis Entertainment Group officially released it as Sinatra '57 in Concert in 1999, after Sinatra's death.

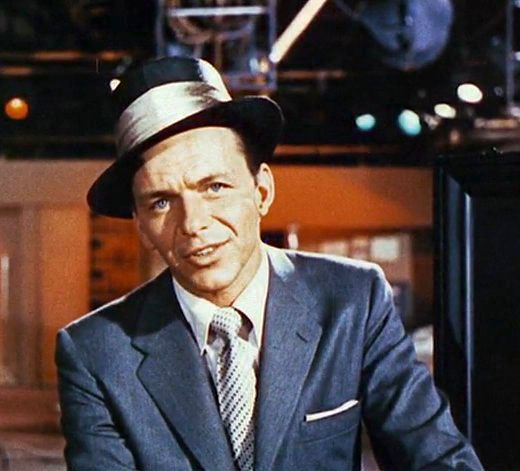
Sinatra in Pal Joey (1957)

In 1958, Sinatra released the concept album Come Fly with Me with Billy May, designed as a musical world tour. It reached the top spot on the Billboard album chart in its second week, remaining at the top for five weeks, and was nominated for the Grammy Award for Album of the Year at the inaugural Grammy Awards. The title song, "Come Fly With Me", written especially for him, would become one of Sinatra's best-known standards. On May 29, he recorded seven songs in a single session, more than double the usual yield of a recording session, and an eighth, "Lush Life", was abandoned as Sinatra found it too technically demanding. In September, Sinatra released Frank Sinatra Sings for Only the Lonely, a stark collection of introspective (Note: Granata noted that Riddle himself believed that the album came across as darker and more introspective than normal due to the death of his own mother who had recently died earlier in the month that it was recorded.) saloon songs and blues-tinged ballads, which proved a huge commercial success, spending 120 weeks on Billboard's album chart and peaking at No. 1. Cuts from this LP, such as "Angel Eyes" and "One for My Baby (and One More for the Road)", would remain staples of the "saloon song" segments of Sinatra's concerts.

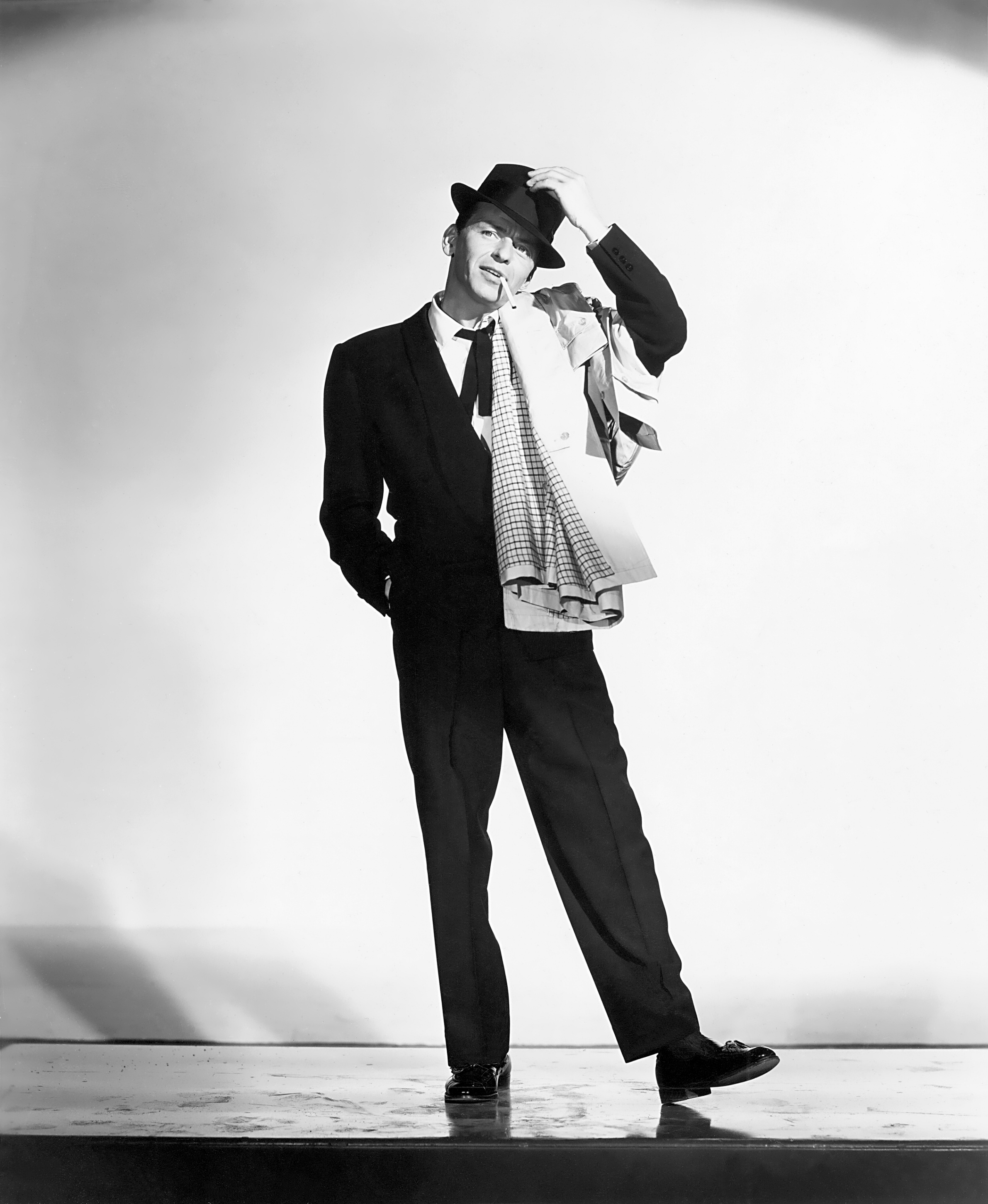
Sinatra in 1957 publicity shot

In 1959, Sinatra released Come Dance with Me!, a highly successful, critically acclaimed album that stayed on Billboard's Pop album chart for 140 weeks, peaking at No. 2. It won the Grammy Award for Album of the Year, as well as Best Vocal Performance, Male and Best Arrangement for Billy May. Sinatra released No One Cares in the same year, a collection of "brooding, lonely" torch songs, which critic Stephen Thomas Erlewine thought was "nearly as good as its predecessor Where Are You?, but lacked the "lush" arrangements of it and the "grandiose melancholy" of Only the Lonely.

In May 1959, Sinatra wrote an article entitled "You Can't Hate and be Happy" for a publication called "What the Stars Say" published by the Stars Campaign for Inter-Racial Friendship after the murder, in London, of Kelso Cochrane. In the words of Kelley, by 1959, Sinatra was "not simply the leader of the Rat Pack" but had "assumed the position of il padrone in Hollywood." He was asked by 20th Century Fox to be the master of ceremonies at a luncheon attended by Soviet Premier Nikita Khrushchev on September 19, 1959.

=== 1960–1970: Reprise years ===
==== Issues with Capitol ====
Nice 'n' Easy, a collection of ballads, topped the Billboard chart in October 1960 and remained in the charts for 86 weeks, winning critical plaudits. However, Sinatra grew discontented at Capitol and feuded with label president Alan W. Livingston, which lasted over six months. Sinatra's first attempt at owning his own label was with his pursuit of buying declining jazz label Verve Records, which ended once an initial agreement with Verve founder Norman Granz "failed to materialize".

Sinatra decided to form his own label, Reprise Records, and, in an effort to assert his new direction, temporarily parted with Riddle, May and Jenkins, working with other arrangers such as Neil Hefti, Don Costa, and Quincy Jones. Sinatra built the appeal of Reprise Records as one in which artists were promised creative control, as well as a guarantee that they would eventually gain "complete ownership of their work, including publishing rights."

==== Ownership of Reprise ====
Under Sinatra the company developed into a music industry "powerhouse", and he later sold it for an estimated $80 million. Sinatra's first album on the label, Ring-a-Ding-Ding! (1961), was a major success, peaking at No.4 on Billboard. The album was released in February 1961, the same month that Reprise Records released Ben Webster's The Warm Moods, Sammy Davis Jr.'s The Wham of Sam, Mavis River's Mavis and Joe E. Lewis's It is Now Post Time. During the initial years of Reprise, Sinatra was still under contract to record for Capitol, completing his contractual commitment with the release of Point of No Return, recorded on September 11 and 12, 1961.

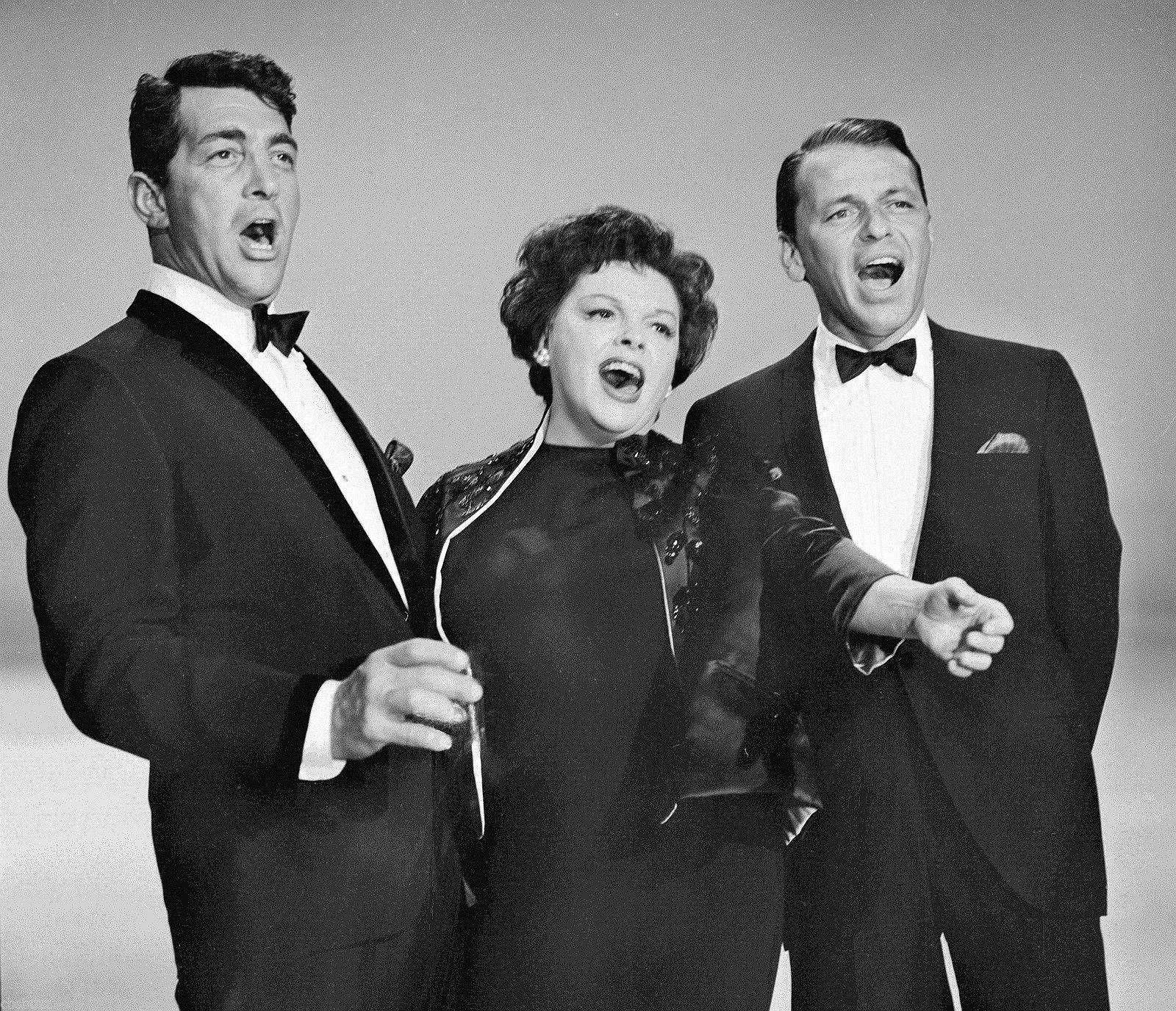
Sinatra with Dean Martin and Judy Garland in 1962

In 1962, Sinatra released Sinatra and Strings, a set of standard ballads arranged by Don Costa, which became one of the most critically acclaimed works of Sinatra's Reprise period. Frank Jr., who was present during the recording, noted the "huge orchestra", which Nancy Sinatra stated "opened a whole new era" in pop music, with orchestras getting bigger, embracing a "lush string sound".

Sinatra and Count Basie collaborated for the album Sinatra-Basie the same year, a popular and successful release, which prompted them to rejoin two years later for the follow-up It Might as Well Be Swing, arranged by Quincy Jones. The two became frequent performers together, and appeared at the Newport Jazz Festival in 1965. Also in 1962, as the owner of his own record label, Sinatra was able to step on the podium as conductor again, releasing his third instrumental album Frank Sinatra Conducts Music from Pictures and Plays.

In 1963, Sinatra reunited with Nelson Riddle for The Concert Sinatra, an ambitious album featuring a 73-piece symphony orchestra arranged and conducted by Riddle. The concert was recorded on a motion picture scoring soundstage with the use of multiple synchronized recording machines that employed an optical signal onto 35 mm film designed for movie soundtracks. Granata considers the album to have been "impeachable" [sic], "one of the very best of the Sinatra-Riddle ballad albums", where Sinatra displayed his vocal range, particularly in "Ol' Man River", in which Sinatra darkened the hue.

In 1964, the song "My Kind of Town" was nominated for the Academy Award for Best Original Song. Sinatra released Softly, as I Leave You, and collaborated with Bing Crosby and Fred Waring on America, I Hear You Singing, a collection of patriotic songs recorded as a tribute to the assassinated President John F. Kennedy. Sinatra increasingly became involved in charitable pursuits in this period. In 1961 and 1962, he went to Mexico to put on performances for Mexican charities, (Note: Nancy Sinatra notes that her father had a falling out with a bureaucrat in the country, who refused to admit Sinatra into his house. She says that though he was not formally banned from the country, the bureaucrat "made it seem so" and stated that the situation caused much humiliation to the family.) and in July 1964, Sinatra was present at the dedication of the Frank Sinatra International Youth Center for Arab and Jewish children in Nazareth.

The Rat Pack concert, called The Frank Sinatra Spectacular, was broadcast live via satellite to numerous movie theaters across America. The album September of My Years was released September 1965, and went on to win the Grammy Award for best album of the year. Granata considers the album to have been one of the finest of his Reprise years, "a reflective throwback to the concept records of the 1950s, and more than any of those collections, distills everything that Frank Sinatra had ever learned or experienced as a vocalist". One of the album's singles, "It Was a Very Good Year", won the Grammy Award for Best Vocal Performance, Male. A career anthology, A Man and His Music, followed in November, winning Album of the Year at the Grammys the following year.

In 1966, Sinatra released That's Life, with both the single of "That's Life" and album becoming Top Ten hits on Billboard's pop charts. Strangers in the Night went on to top the Billboard and UK pop singles charts, winning the award for Record of the Year at the Grammys.

==== Collaborations with other artists and "My Way" ====
Sinatra's first live album, Sinatra at the Sands, was recorded during January and February 1966 at the Sands Hotel and Casino in Las Vegas. He was backed by the Count Basie Orchestra, with Quincy Jones conducting. Sinatra pulled out from the Sands the following year when he was driven out by its new owner Howard Hughes after a fight. (Note: Hughes still resented Sinatra for marrying Ava Gardner, the subject of his own affections. After Hughes saw to it that the hotel imposed restrictions on what he could gamble in the casino, Sinatra began what The Los Angeles Times describes as a "weekend-long tirade" against the "hotel's management, employees and security forces", culminating in a punch from executive Carl Cohen that knocked the caps off Sinatra's front teeth. He began performing at Caesars Palace.)

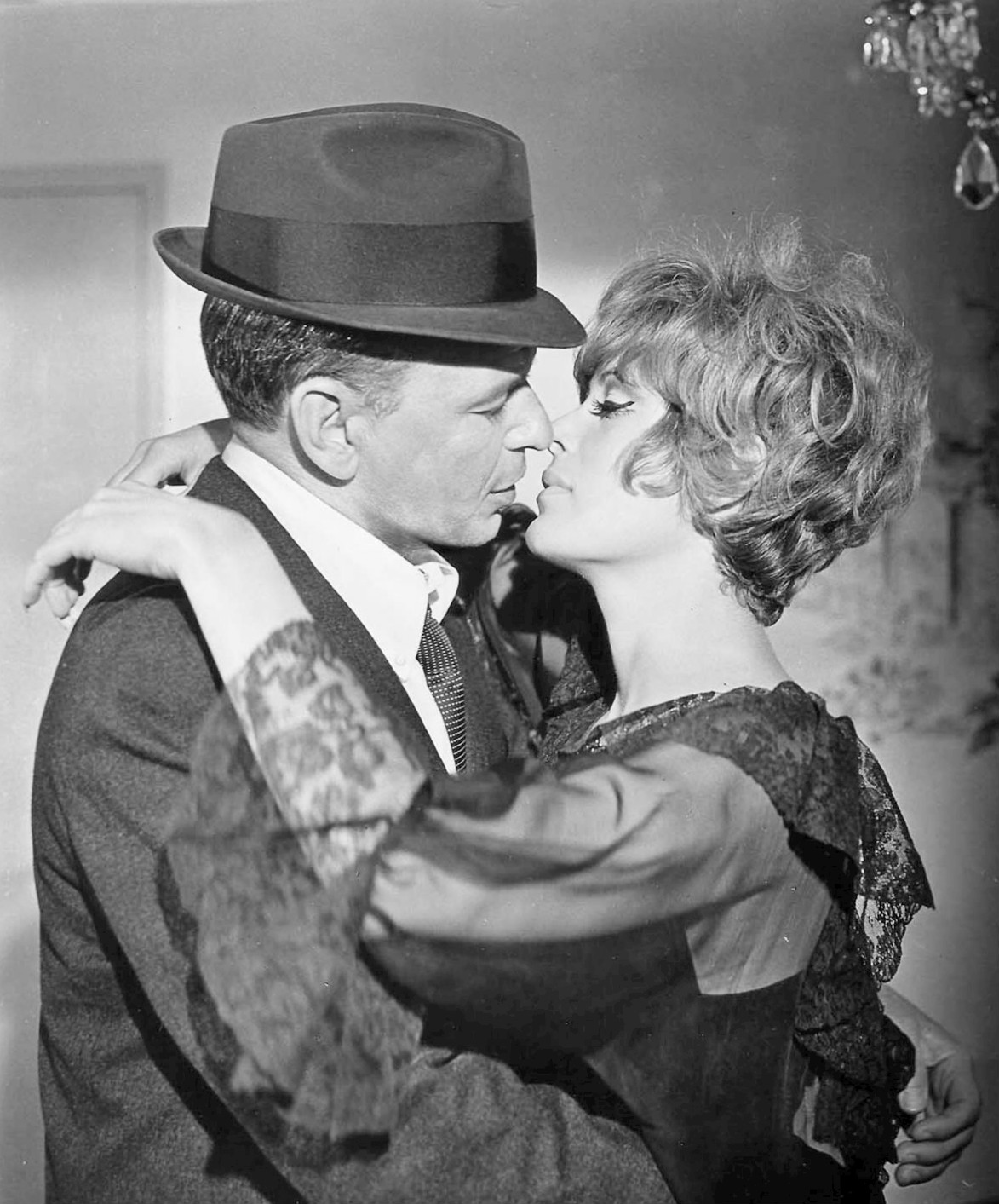
Sinatra with Jill St. John in Tony Rome (1967)

Sinatra started 1967 with a series of recording sessions with Antônio Carlos Jobim. He recorded one of his collaborations with Jobim, the Grammy-nominated album Francis Albert Sinatra & Antônio Carlos Jobim, which was one of the best-selling albums of the year, behind the Beatles's Sgt. Pepper's Lonely Hearts Club Band. According to Santopietro, the album "consists of an extraordinarily effective blend of bossa nova and slightly swinging jazz vocals, and succeeds in creating an unbroken mood of romance and regret." Writer Stan Cornyn wrote that Sinatra sang so softly on the album that it was comparable to the time that he suffered from a vocal hemorrhage in 1950.

Sinatra released the album The World We Knew, which features a chart-topping duet of "Somethin' Stupid" with daughter Nancy. In December, Sinatra collaborated with Duke Ellington on the album Francis A. & Edward K.. According to Granata, the recording of "Indian Summer" on the album was a favorite of Riddle's, noting the "contemplative mood [which] is heightened by a Johnny Hodges alto sax solo that will bring a tear to your eye".

With Sinatra in mind, singer-songwriter Paul Anka wrote the song "My Way", using the melody of the French "Comme d'habitude" ("As Usual"), composed by Claude François and Jacques Revaux. Sinatra recorded it in one take, just after Christmas 1968. "My Way", Sinatra's best-known song on the Reprise label, was not an instant success, charting at No. 27 in the US and No. 5 in the UK. However, it remained in the UK charts for 122 weeks, including 75 non-consecutive weeks in the Top 40, between April 1969 and September 1971, which was still a record in 2015. Sinatra told songwriter Ervin Drake in the 1970s that he "detested" singing the song because he believed audiences would think it was a "self-aggrandizing tribute". According to NPR, "My Way" has become one of the most requested songs at funerals.

In an effort to maintain his commercial viability in the late 1960s, Sinatra would record works by Paul Simon ("Mrs. Robinson"), the Beatles ("Yesterday"), and Joni Mitchell ("Both Sides, Now") in 1969.

=== 1970–1981: "Retirement" and return ===
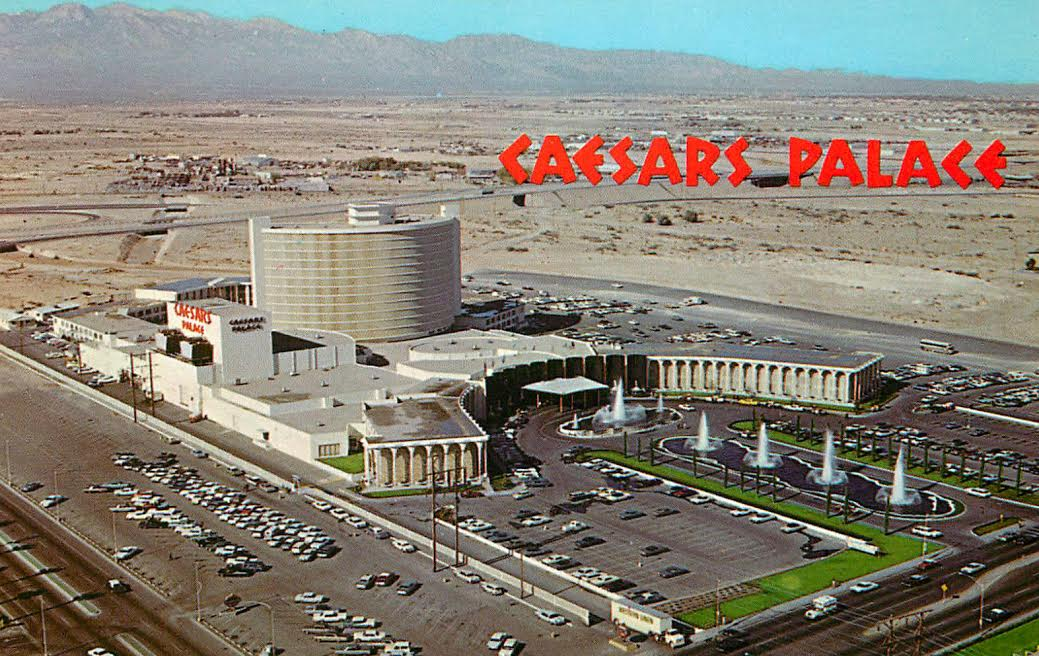
Caesars Palace in 1970, where Sinatra performed from 1967 to 1970 and 1973 onwards

In 1970, Sinatra released Watertown, a critically acclaimed concept album, with music by Bob Gaudio (of the Four Seasons) and lyrics by Jake Holmes. However, it sold a mere 30,000 copies that year and reached a peak chart position of 101.

Sinatra left Caesars Palace in September of that year after an incident in which executive Sanford Waterman pulled a gun on him. (Note: Sinatra was playing a high stakes baccarat at Caesars Palace in the early morning of September 6, 1970. Normal limits for the game are US$2,000 per hand; Sinatra had been playing for US$8,000 and wanted the stakes to be raised to US$16,000. When Sinatra began shouting, hotel executive Sanford Waterman came to talk with him. Witnesses said Waterman and Sinatra both made threats, and Waterman pointed a gun at Sinatra. Sinatra returned to Palm Springs without completing his three-week engagement. Waterman was arrested but not prosecuted.) Sinatra performed several charity concerts with Count Basie at the Royal Festival Hall in London. On November 2, 1970, Sinatra recorded the last songs for Reprise Records before his self-imposed retirement, announced the following June at a concert in Hollywood to raise money for the Motion Picture and TV Relief Fund. He gave a "rousing" performance of "That's Life", and finished the concert with a Matt Dennis and Earl Brent song, "Angel Eyes", which Sinatra had recorded on the Only the Lonely album in 1958. He sang the last line. "'Scuse me while I disappear." The spotlight went dark, and he left the stage.

Sinatra told LIFE journalist Thomas Thompson, "I've got things to do, like the first thing is not to do anything at all for eight months ... maybe a year", while Barbara Sinatra later said that Sinatra had grown "tired of entertaining people, especially when all they really wanted were the same old tunes he had long ago become bored by". Around this time, Sinatra designed Villa Maggio, a holiday home and retreat near Palm Desert. While he was in retirement, President Richard Nixon asked Sinatra to perform at a Young Voters Rally in anticipation of the upcoming campaign. He obliged and chose to sing "My Kind of Town" for the rally held in Chicago on October 20, 1972.

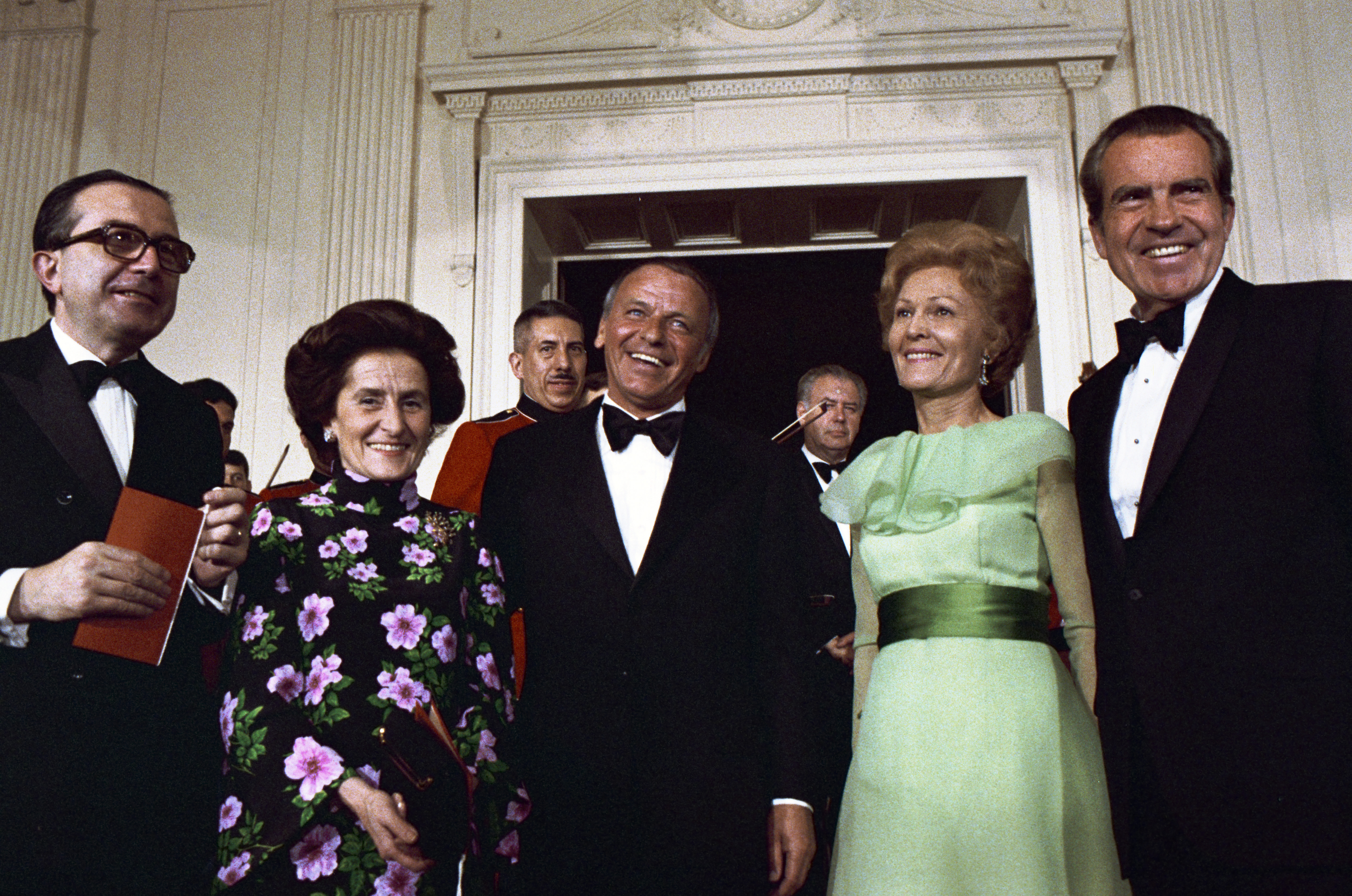
Sinatra (center) with President Richard Nixon and Italian Prime Minister Giulio Andreotti in 1973

In 1973, Sinatra came out of his short-lived retirement with a television special and album. The album, entitled Ol' Blue Eyes Is Back, arranged by Gordon Jenkins and Don Costa, was a success, reaching number 13 on Billboard and number 12 in the UK. The television special, Magnavox Presents Frank Sinatra, reunited Sinatra with Gene Kelly.

Sinatra initially developed problems with his vocal cords during the comeback due to a prolonged period without singing. That Christmas, Sinatra performed at the Sahara Hotel in Las Vegas, and returned to Caesars Palace the following month in January 1974. He began what Barbara Sinatra describes as a "massive comeback tour of the United States, Europe, the Far East, and Australia." In July, while on a second tour of Australia, Sinatra caused an uproar by describing journalists there – who were aggressively pursuing his every move and pushing for a press conference – as "bums, parasites, fags, broads and buck-and-a-half hookers." After he was pressured to apologize, Sinatra instead insisted that the journalists apologize for "fifteen years of abuse I have taken from the world press." Union actions canceled concerts and grounded Sinatra's plane, essentially trapping him in Australia.

Sinatra's lawyer, Mickey Rudin, arranged for Sinatra to issue a written conciliatory note and a final concert that was televised to the nation. In October 1974, he appeared at New York City's Madison Square Garden in a televised concert that was later released as an album under the title The Main Event – Live. Backing Sinatra was bandleader Woody Herman and the Young Thundering Herd, who accompanied Sinatra on a European tour later that month.

In 1975, Sinatra performed in concerts in New York with Count Basie and Ella Fitzgerald, and at the London Palladium with Basie and Sarah Vaughan, and in Tehran at Aryamehr Stadium, giving 140 performances in 105 days. In August, Sinatra held several concerts at Lake Tahoe together with the newly risen singer John Denver, who became a frequent collaborator. Sinatra had recorded Denver's "Leaving on a Jet Plane" and "My Sweet Lady" for Sinatra & Company (1971), and according to Denver, his song "A Baby Just Like You", was written at Sinatra's request for his new grandchild, Angela.

During Labor Day weekend in 1976, Sinatra was responsible for reuniting old friends and comedy partners Dean Martin and Jerry Lewis for the first time in nearly 20 years, when they performed at the "Jerry Lewis MDA Telethon". That year, the Friars Club selected Sinatra as the "Top Box Office Name of the Century", and he was given the Scopus Award by the American Friends of the Hebrew University of Jerusalem in Israel and an honorary Doctor of Humane Letters from the University of Nevada.

Sinatra continued to perform at Caesars Palace in the late 1970s and was performing there in January 1977 when his mother Dolly died in a plane crash on her way to see him. Sinatra canceled two weeks of shows and spent time recovering from the shock in Barbados. In March, he performed in front of Princess Margaret at the Royal Albert Hall in London, raising money for the National Society for the Prevention of Cruelty to Children. On March 14, Sinatra recorded with Nelson Riddle for the last time, recording the songs "Linda", "Sweet Lorraine", and "Barbara". The two men had a major falling out and later patched up their differences in January 1985 at a dinner organized for Ronald Reagan when Sinatra asked Riddle to make another album with him. Riddle was ill at the time and died that October before they had a chance to record.

In 1978, Sinatra filed a $1 million lawsuit against a land developer for using his name in the "Frank Sinatra Drive Center" in West Los Angeles. During a party at Caesars in 1979, Sinatra was awarded the Grammy Trustees Award, while celebrating 40 years in show business and his 64th birthday. That same year, former President Gerald Ford awarded Sinatra the International Man of the Year Award, and he performed in front of the Egyptian pyramids for Anwar Sadat, which raised more than $500,000 for Sadat's wife's charities.

In 1980, Sinatra's first album in six years was released, Trilogy: Past Present Future, a highly ambitious triple album that features an array of songs from both the pre-rock and rock eras. It was the first studio album of Sinatra's to feature his touring pianist at the time, Vinnie Falcone, and was based on an idea by Sonny Burke. The album garnered six Grammy nominations – winning for best liner notes – and peaked at number 17 on Billboard's album chart, and spawned yet another song that would become a signature tune, "Theme from New York, New York". That year, as part of the Concert of the Americas, he performed in the Maracanã Stadium in Rio de Janeiro, Brazil, which broke records for the "largest live paid audience ever recorded for a solo performer".

In 1981, Sinatra built on the success of Trilogy with She Shot Me Down, an album that was praised for embodying the dark tone of his Capitol years. That same year, Sinatra was embroiled in controversy when he worked a 10-day engagement for $2 million in Sun City, in the internationally unrecognized Bophuthatswana, breaking a cultural boycott against apartheid-era South Africa. President Lucas Mangope awarded Sinatra with the highest honor, the Order of the Leopard, and made him an honorary tribal chief.

=== 1982–1997: Later career and final projects ===
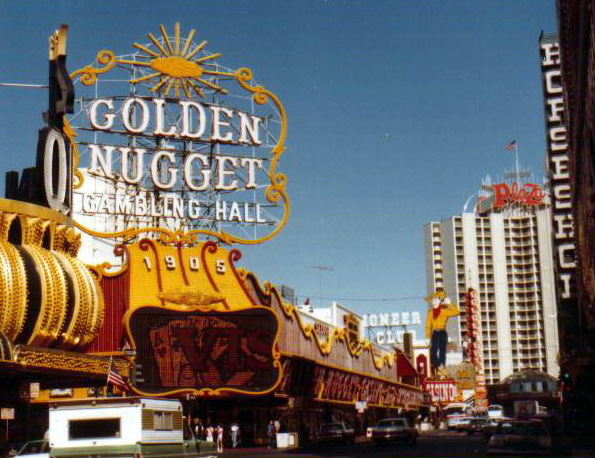
Sinatra signed a $16 million three-year deal with the Golden Nugget Las Vegas in 1982.

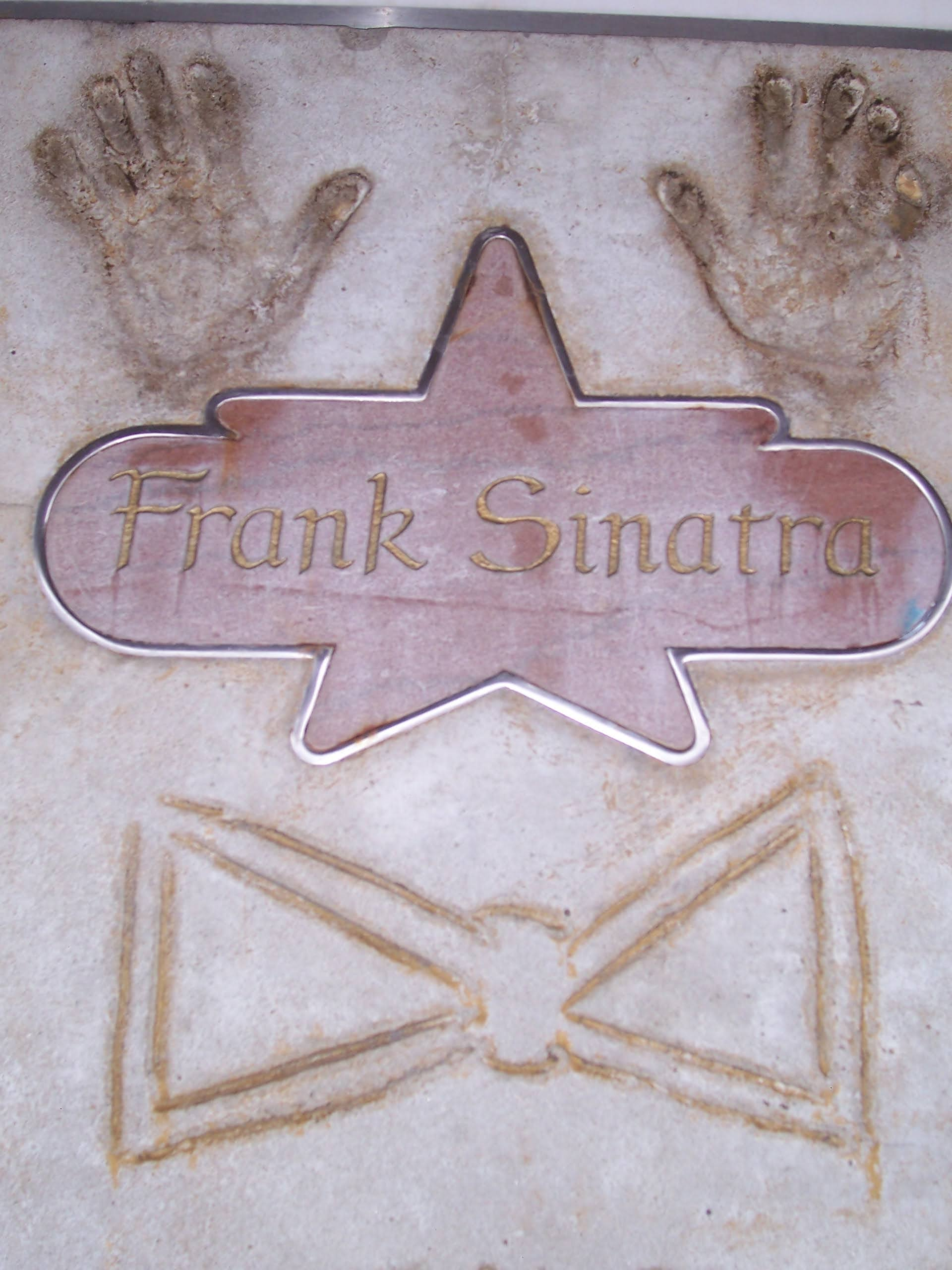
Handprint of Sinatra. Atlantic City Boardwalk, New Jersey, US, 2006

Santopietro stated that by the early 1980s, Sinatra's voice had "coarsened, losing much of its power and flexibility, but audiences didn't care." Kelley noted that by this period, Sinatra's voice had grown "darker, tougher and loamier", but he "continued to captivate audiences with his immutable magic." She added that Sinatra's baritone voice "sometimes cracked, but the gliding intonations still aroused the same raptures of delight as they had at the Paramount Theater."

Also in 1982, Sinatra made a reported further $1.3 million from the Showtime television rights to his "Concert of the Americas" in the Dominican Republic, $1.6 million for a concert series at Carnegie Hall, and $250,000 in just one evening at the Chicago Fest. Sinatra donated a lot of his earnings to charity. He put on a performance at the White House for Italian president Sandro Pertini, and performed at the Radio City Music Hall with Luciano Pavarotti and George Shearing.

Sinatra was honored at the 1983 Kennedy Center Honors, alongside Katherine Dunham, James Stewart, Elia Kazan, and Virgil Thomson. Quoting Henry James, President Reagan said in honoring his old friend that "art was the shadow of humanity" and that Sinatra had "spent his life casting a magnificent and powerful shadow."

On September 21, 1983, Sinatra filed a $2 million court case against Kitty Kelley, suing her for punitive damages, before her unofficial biography, His Way, was even published. The book became a best-seller for "all the wrong reasons" and "the most eye-opening celebrity biography of our time", according to William Safire of The New York Times. Sinatra was always adamant that such a book would be written on his terms, and he himself would "set the record straight" in details of his life.

According to Kelley, the family detested her and the book, which took its toll on Sinatra's health. Kelley says that Tina Sinatra blamed her for her father's colon surgery in 1986. He was forced to drop the case on September 19, 1984, with several leading newspapers expressing concerns about censorship.

In 1984, Sinatra worked with Quincy Jones for the first time in nearly two decades on the album L.A. Is My Lady, which was well received critically. The album was a substitute for another Jones project, an album of duets with Lena Horne, which had to be abandoned. (Note: Horne developed vocal problems, and Sinatra, committed to other engagements, could not wait to record.) In 1986, Sinatra collapsed on stage while performing in Atlantic City and was hospitalized for diverticulitis, which left him looking frail. Two years later, Sinatra reunited with Martin and Davis and went on the Rat Pack Reunion Tour, during which they played many large arenas. When Martin dropped out of the tour early on, a rift developed between them, and the two never spoke again.

On June 6, 1988, Sinatra made his last recordings with Reprise for an album that was not released. He recorded "My Foolish Heart", "Cry Me a River", and other songs. Sinatra never completed the project, but take number 18 of "My Foolish Heart" may be heard in The Complete Reprise Studio Recordings (1995).

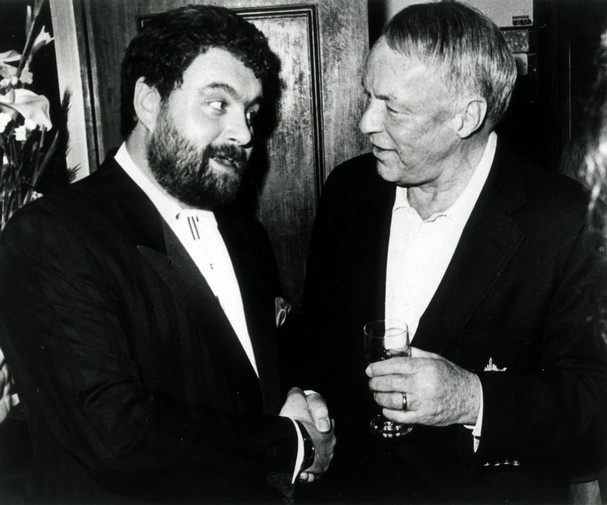
Brendan Grace and Sinatra in 1991

In 1990, Sinatra was awarded the second "Ella Award" by the Los Angeles-based Society of Singers, and performed for a final time with Ella Fitzgerald at the award ceremony. He maintained an active touring schedule in the early 1990s, performing 65 concerts in 1990, 73 in 1991, and 84 in 1992 in 17 countries.

In 1993, Sinatra returned to Capitol Records and the recording studio for Duets, which became his best-selling album. The album and its sequel, Duets II, released the following year, would see Sinatra remake his classic recordings with popular contemporary performers, who added their vocals to a pre-recorded tape.

During his tours in the early 1990s, Sinatra's memory failed him at times during concerts, and he fainted onstage in Richmond, Virginia in March 1994. Sinatra's final public concerts were held in Fukuoka Dome in Japan on December 19–20, 1994. The following year, Sinatra sang for the last time on February 25, 1995, before a live audience of 1,200 select guests at the Palm Desert Marriott Ballroom on the closing night of the Frank Sinatra Desert Classic golf tournament.

Esquire reported of the show that Sinatra was "clear, tough, on the money" and "in absolute control". He was awarded the Legend Award at the 1994 Grammy Awards, where Sinatra was introduced by Bono, who said of him, "Frank's the chairman of the bad attitude ... Rock 'n roll plays at being tough, but this guy is the boss – the chairman of boss".

In 1995, to mark Sinatra's 80th birthday, the Empire State Building glowed blue. A star-studded birthday tribute, Sinatra: 80 Years My Way, was held at the Shrine Auditorium in Los Angeles, featuring performers such as Ray Charles, Little Richard, Natalie Cole and Salt-N-Pepa singing his songs. At the end of the program, Sinatra performed on stage for the last time to sing the final notes of the "Theme from New York, New York" with an ensemble. In recognition of his many years of association with Las Vegas, Sinatra was elected to the Gaming Hall of Fame in 1997.

== Artistry ==
=== Orchestral affinity ===
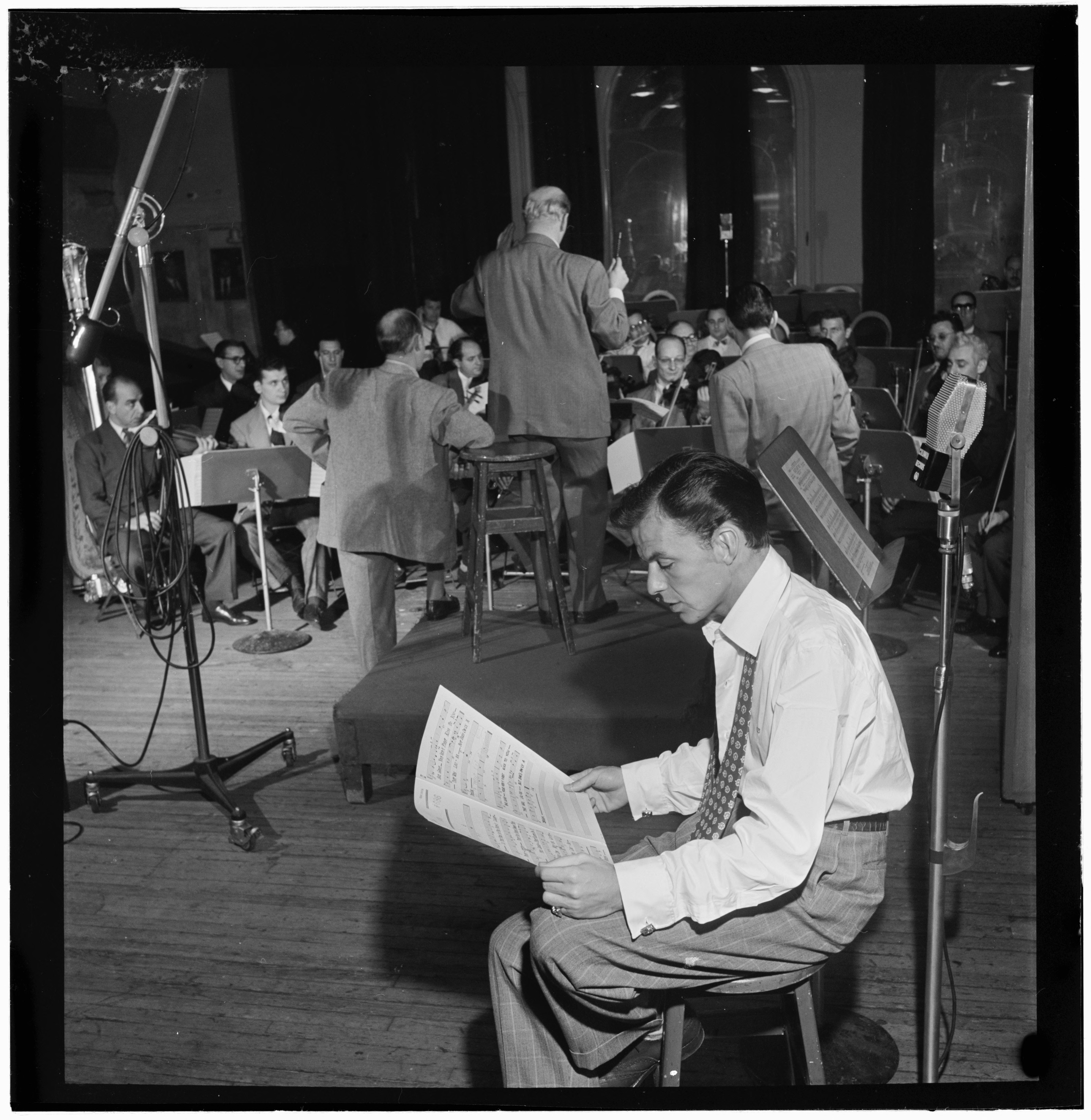
Sinatra with Axel Stordahl at the Liederkrantz Hall in New York, c. 1947

Sinatra reported in 1945, "I wish I knew how to read music." He never learned to read music well, but had a natural understanding of it, and worked very hard from a young age to improve his abilities in all aspects of music. Sinatra could follow a lead sheet (simplified sheet music showing a song's basic structure) during a performance by "carefully following the patterns and groupings of notes arranged on the page" and made his own notations to the music, using his ear to detect semitonal differences.

Granata states that some of the most accomplished classically trained musicians soon noticed his musical understanding and remarked that Sinatra had a "sixth sense", which "demonstrated unusual proficiency when it came to detecting incorrect notes and sounds within the orchestra."

Sinatra was an aficionado of classical music, and would often request classical strains in his music, inspired by composers such as Puccini and Impressionist masters. His personal favorite was Ralph Vaughan Williams. Sinatra would insist on always recording live with the band because it gave him a "certain feeling" to perform live surrounded by musicians. By the mid-1940s, such was Sinatra's understanding of music that after hearing an air check of some compositions by Alec Wilder, which were for strings and woodwinds, he became the conductor at Columbia Records for six of Wilder's compositions. (Note: Mitch Miller played English horn and oboe on the Sinatra-led recordings.) The works were considered by Wilder to have been among the finest renditions and recordings of his compositions, past or present. Critic Gene Lees, a lyricist and the author of the words to the Jobim melody "This Happy Madness", expressed amazement when he heard Sinatra's recording of it on Sinatra & Company (1971), considering him to have delivered the lyrics to perfection.

=== Vocal and musical style ===
Voice coach John Quinlan was impressed by Sinatra's vocal range, remarking, "He has far more voice than people think he has. He can vocalize to a B-flat on top in full voice, and he doesn't need a mic either". As a singer, early on, he was primarily influenced by Bing Crosby, but later believed that Tony Bennett was "the best singer in the business." Bennett himself claimed that as a performer, Sinatra had "perfected the art of intimacy." According to Nelson Riddle, Sinatra had a "fairly rangy voice", (Note: Riddle notes that Sinatra's range was from the low G to the high F, almost two octaves, but that his practical range was the low A-flat to a D, in comparison to Bing Crosby whose range was G to C. Though Riddle stated that Sinatra's lowest was G, he often hit the low F in concerts and hit the low E at 0:41 in the recording of "What Is This Thing Called Love?" for the 1955 album In the Wee Small Hours.) remarking: "His voice has a very strident, insistent sound in the top register, a smooth lyrical sound in the middle register, and a very tender sound in the low. His voice is built on infinite taste, with an overall inflection of sex. He points everything he does from a sexual standpoint".

Despite his heavy New Jersey accent, when Sinatra sang, his accent was barely detectable; according to Richard Schuller, Sinatra's diction became "precise" while singing and his articulation "meticulous". Sinatra's timing was impeccable, allowing him, according to Granata, to "toy with the rhythm of a melody, bringing tremendous excitement to his reading of a lyric." Tommy Dorsey observed that Sinatra would sing "without breathing for eight, ten, maybe sixteen bars." Dorsey was a considerable influence on Sinatra's techniques for his vocal phrasing with his own exceptional breath control on the trombone, and Sinatra regularly swam and held his breath underwater, thinking of song lyrics to increase his breathing power.

He'd always been critical of his voice, and that only intensified as he got older. He never liked to discuss a performance afterward because he knew his voice wasn't as good as it used to be. If someone told him he'd been great, he'd reply, "It was a nice crowd, but my reed was off" or "I wasn't so good on the third number." Strangely, in spite of his hearing problems, he had the most incredible ear, which often drove those he worked with nuts. There could be an orchestra of a hundred musicians, and if one played a bum note, he'd know exactly who was responsible.

— Barbara Sinatra on Sinatra's voice and musical understanding.

After a period of performing, Sinatra tired of singing a certain set of songs and was always looking for talented new songwriters and composers to work with. Once he found ones he liked, Sinatra actively sought to work with them as often as possible and made friends with many of them. Over the years, he recorded 87 of Sammy Cahn's songs, of which 24 were composed by Jule Styne and 43 by Jimmy Van Heusen. The Cahn-Styne partnership lasted from 1942 until 1954, when Van Heusen succeeded him as Sinatra's main composer.

Unlike many of his contemporaries, Sinatra insisted upon direct input regarding arrangements and tempos for his recordings. Sinatra would spend weeks thinking about the songs he wanted to record and would keep an arranger in mind for each song. Barbara Sinatra notes that Sinatra would almost always credit the songwriter at the end of each number and would often make comments to the audience, such as "Isn't that a pretty ballad" or "Don't you think that's the most marvelous love song", delivered with "childlike delight". She states that after each show, Sinatra would be "in a buoyant, electrically charged mood, a post-show high that would take him hours to come down from as he quietly relived every note of the performance he'd just given."

Sinatra's split with Ava Gardner in the fall of 1953 had a profound impact on the types of songs he sang and on his voice. Sinatra began to console himself in songs with a "brooding melancholy", such as "I'm a Fool to Want You", "Don't Worry 'Bout Me", "My One and Only Love" and "There Will Never Be Another You". Riddle credited Sinatra's loss of Gardner with his ability to sing these types of songs on In the Wee Small Hours.

Lahr comments that the new Sinatra was "not the gentle boy balladeer of the forties. Fragility had gone from his voice, to be replaced by a virile adult's sense of happiness and hurt". Granata considered Sinatra a "master of the art of recording", noting that his work in the studio "set him apart from other gifted vocalists." During his career, Sinatra made over 1,000 recordings. Recording sessions would typically last three hours. However, Sinatra would always prepare for them by spending at least an hour by the piano beforehand to vocalize, followed by a short rehearsal with the orchestra to ensure the balance of sound.

In the 1950s, Sinatra's career was facilitated by developments in technology. Up to 16 songs could now be held by the 12-inch L.P., "and this allowed Sinatra to use song in a novelistic way, turning each track into a kind of chapter, which built and counterpointed moods to illuminate a larger theme". Santopietro writes that through the 1950s and well into the 1960s, "Every Sinatra LP was a masterpiece of one sort of another, whether uptempo, torch song, or swingin' affairs. Track after track, the brilliant concept albums redefined the nature of pop vocal art".

Sinatra is among the world's best-selling music artists, with an estimated 150 million record sales globally.

== Film career ==
=== 1941–1952: Debut, musical films, and career slump ===
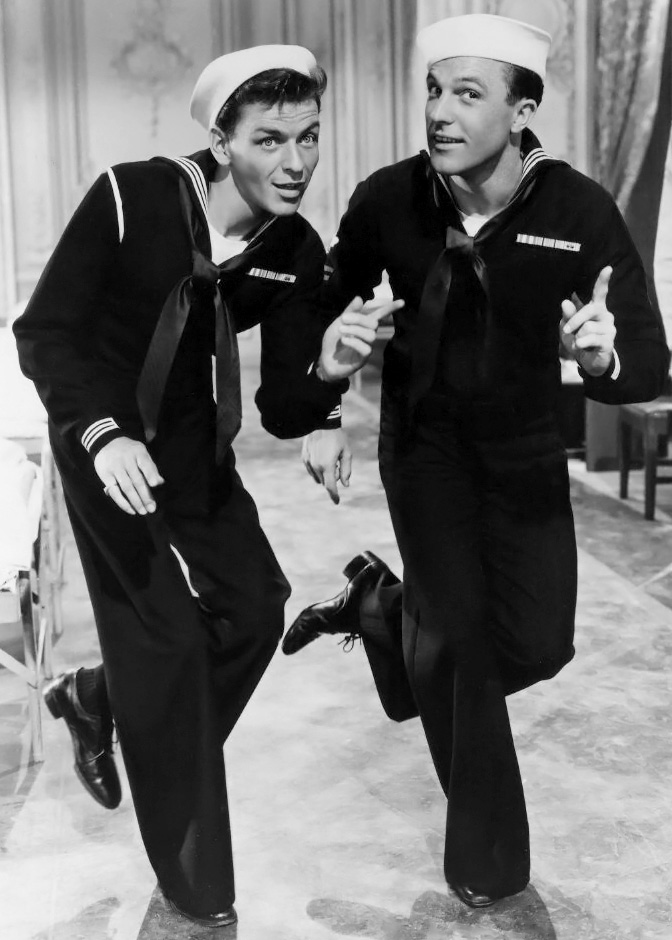
Sinatra and Gene Kelly in Anchors Aweigh (1945)

Sinatra attempted to pursue an acting career in Hollywood in the early 1940s. While films appealed to him, being exceptionally self-confident, Sinatra was rarely enthusiastic about his own acting, once remarking that "pictures stink". Sinatra made his film debut performing in an uncredited sequence in Las Vegas Nights (1941), singing "I'll Never Smile Again" with Tommy Dorsey's Pied Pipers. Sinatra had a cameo role along with Duke Ellington and Count Basie in Charles Barton's Reveille with Beverly (1943), making a brief appearance singing "Night and Day". Next, he was given leading roles in Higher and Higher and Step Lively (both 1944) for RKO.

Metro-Goldwyn-Mayer cast Sinatra opposite Gene Kelly and Kathryn Grayson in the Technicolor musical Anchors Aweigh (1945), in which he played a sailor on leave in Hollywood. A major success, it garnered several Academy Award wins and nominations, and the song "I Fall in Love Too Easily", sung by Sinatra in the film, was nominated for the Academy Award for Best Original Song. He briefly appeared at the end of Richard Whorf's commercially successful Till the Clouds Roll By (1946), a Technicolor musical biopic of Jerome Kern, in which Sinatra sang "Ol' Man River".

Sinatra co-starred again with Gene Kelly in the Technicolor musical Take Me Out to the Ball Game (1949), in which they play baseball players who are part-time vaudevillians. He teamed up with Kelly for a third time in On the Town (1949), playing a sailor on leave in New York City. The film remains rated very highly by critics, and in 2006, it ranked No. 19 on the American Film Institute's list of best musicals. Both Double Dynamite (1951), an RKO Irving Cummings comedy produced by Howard Hughes, and Joseph Pevney's Meet Danny Wilson (1952) failed to make an impression.

=== 1953–1959: Career comeback and prime ===
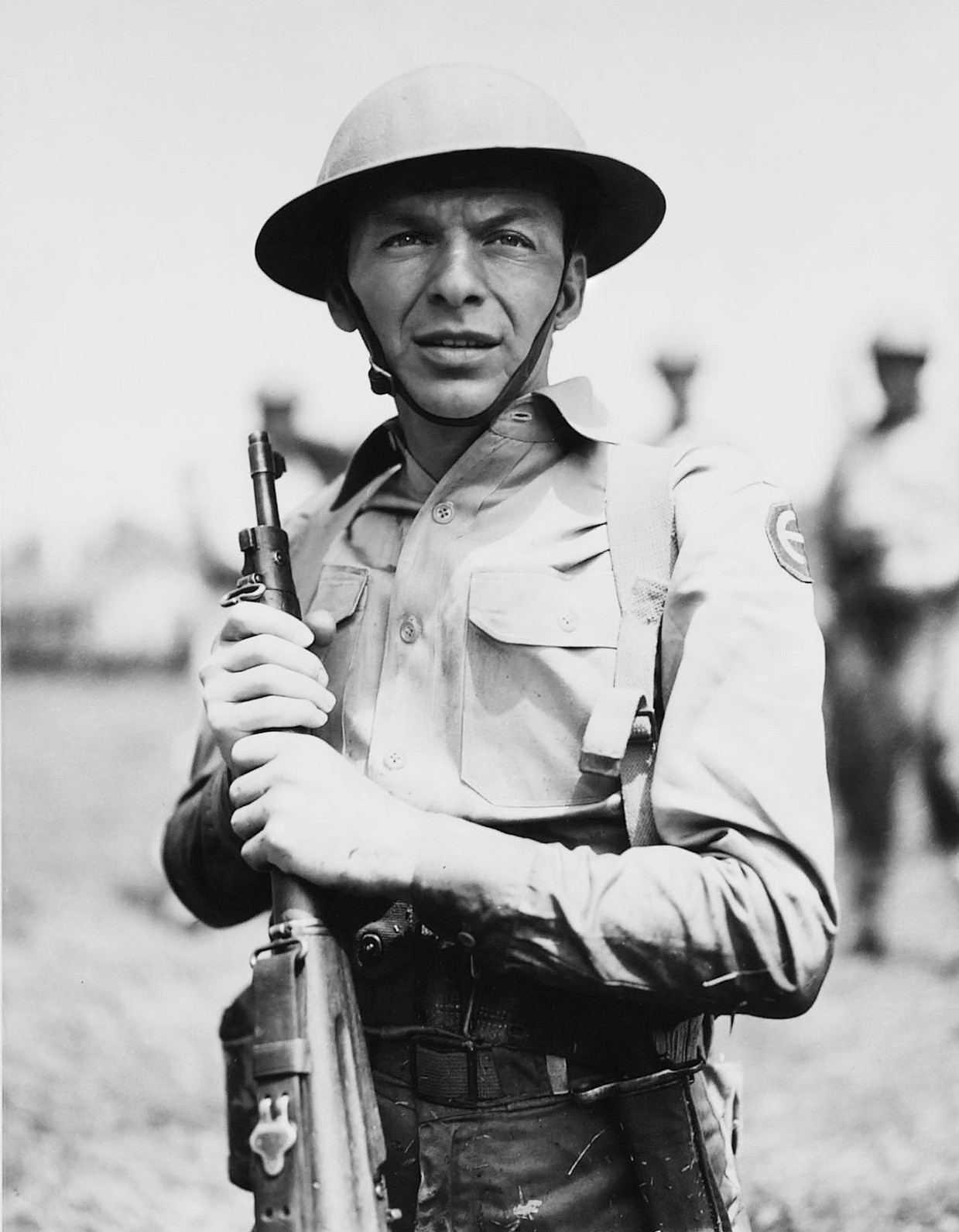
Sinatra as Maggio in From Here to Eternity

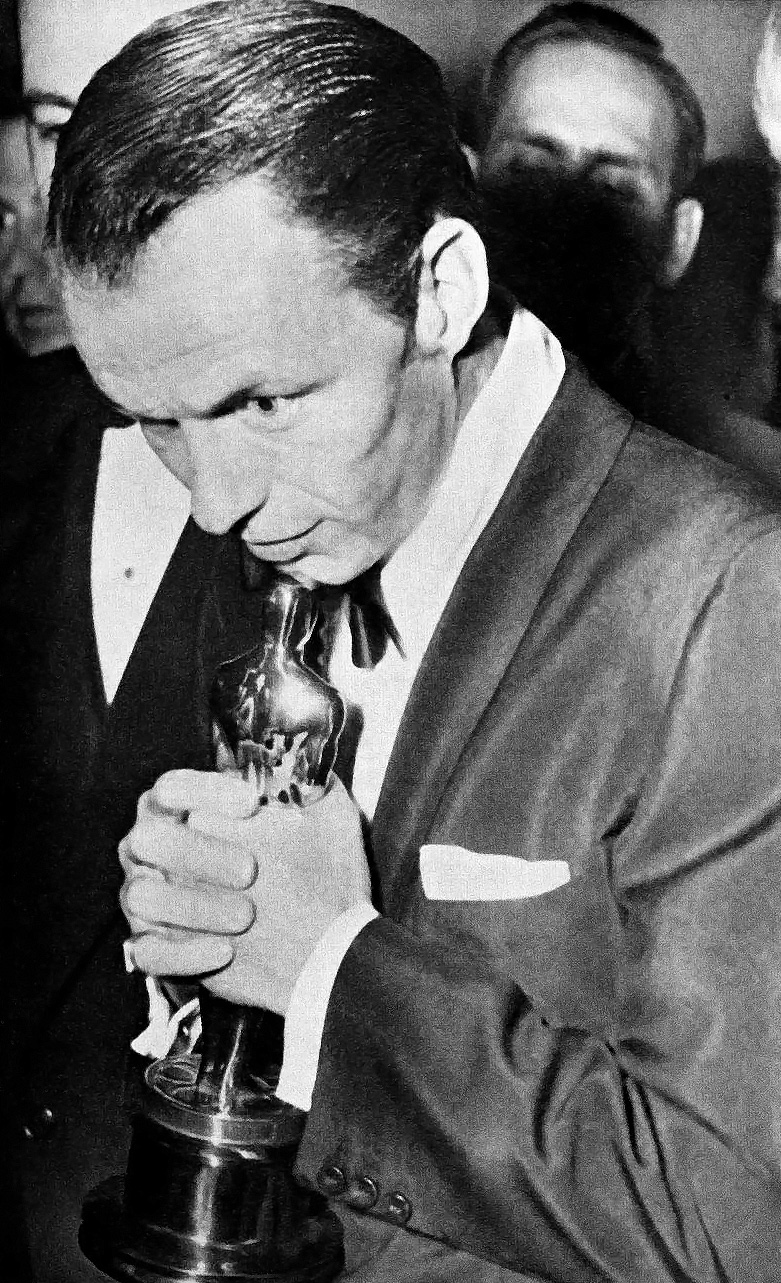
Sinatra at the 26th Academy Awards

For his performance in From Here to Eternity (1953), Sinatra received the Academy Award for Best Supporting Actor.

Fred Zinnemann's From Here to Eternity (1953) deals with the tribulations of three soldiers, played by Burt Lancaster, Montgomery Clift, and Sinatra, stationed on Hawaii in the months leading up to the attack on Pearl Harbor. Sinatra had long been desperate to find a film role that would bring him back into the spotlight, and Columbia Pictures boss Harry Cohn had been inundated by appeals to give Sinatra a chance to star as "Maggio" in the film. (Note: Sinatra successfully later sued a BBC interviewer who said that he'd used his Mafia connections to get the part.) During production, Montgomery Clift became a close friend, and Sinatra later professed that he "learned more about acting from him than anybody I ever knew before". After several years of critical and commercial decline, his Academy Award for Best Supporting Actor win helped Sinatra regain his position as the top recording artist in the world. Sinatra's performance also won a Golden Globe Award for Best Supporting Actor – Motion Picture. The Los Angeles Examiner wrote that Sinatra is "simply superb, comical, pitiful, childishly brave, pathetically defiant", commenting that his death scene is "one of the best ever photographed".

Sinatra starred opposite Doris Day in the musical film Young at Heart (1954), and earned critical praise for his performance as a psychopathic killer posing as an FBI agent opposite Sterling Hayden in the film noir Suddenly (1954).

Sinatra was nominated for an Academy Award for Best Actor and BAFTA Award for Best Actor in a Leading Role for his role as a heroin addict in The Man with the Golden Arm (1955). (Note: Sinatra later remarked that he had always considered his performance in The Man with the Golden Arm to have been the greatest of his film career and that he'd won the Oscar for the wrong role.) After roles in Guys and Dolls, and The Tender Trap (both 1955), Sinatra was nominated for a BAFTA Award for Best Actor in a Leading Role for his role as a medical student in Stanley Kramer's directorial début, Not as a Stranger (1955). During production, Sinatra got drunk with Robert Mitchum and Broderick Crawford and trashed Kramer's dressing room. Kramer vowed at the time never to hire Sinatra again and later regretted casting him as a Spanish guerrilla leader in The Pride and the Passion (1957).

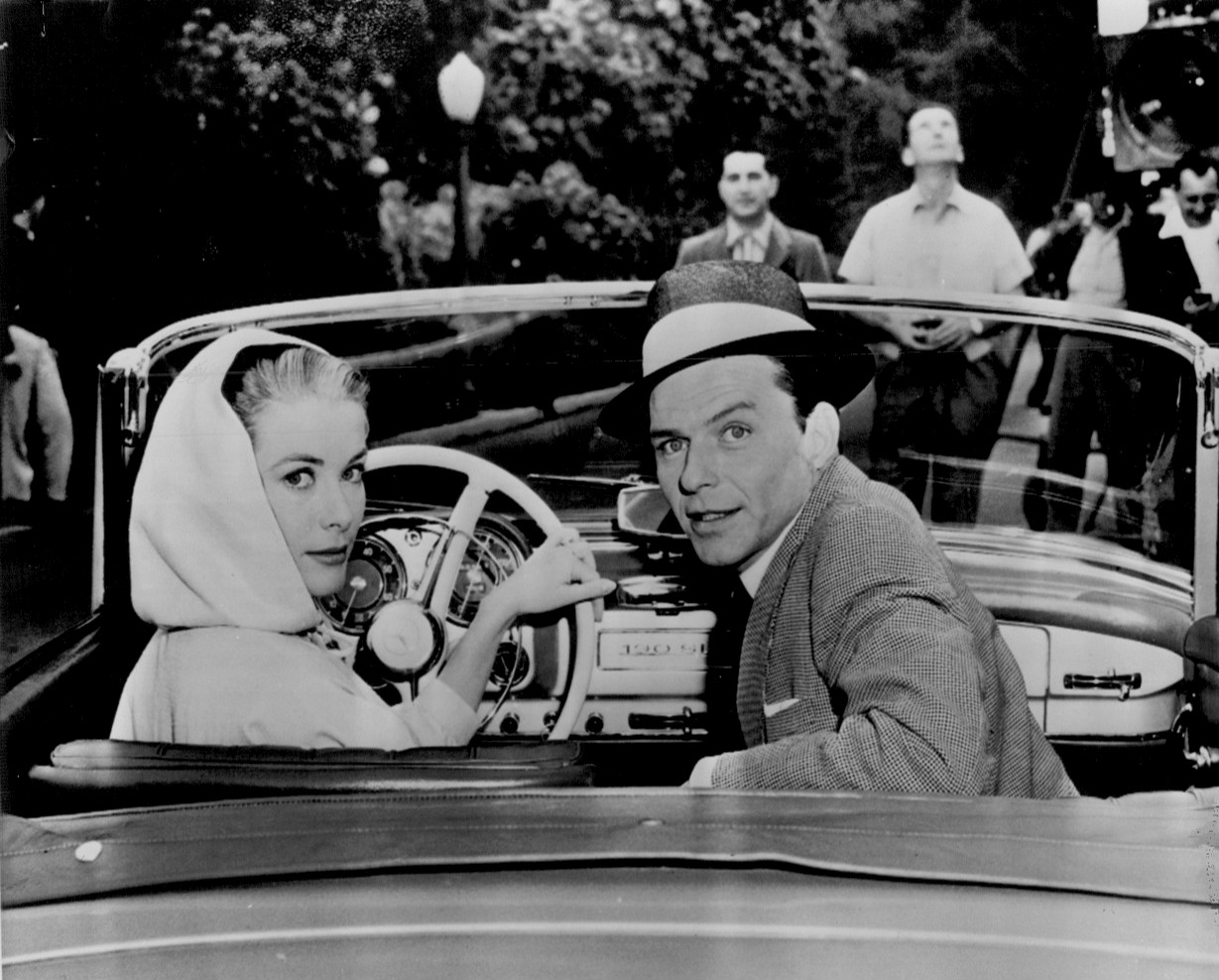
Sinatra with Grace Kelly on the set of High Society (1956)

Sinatra featured alongside Bing Crosby and Grace Kelly in High Society (1956) for MGM, earning a reported $250,000 for the picture. The public rushed to the cinemas to see Sinatra and Crosby together on-screen, and it ended up earning over $13 million at the box office, becoming one of the highest-grossing pictures of its year. He starred opposite Rita Hayworth and Kim Novak in George Sidney's Pal Joey (1957), for which Sinatra won a Golden Globe Award for Best Actor – Motion Picture Musical or Comedy. Santopietro considers the scene in which Sinatra sings "The Lady Is a Tramp" to have been the finest moment of his film career. He next portrayed comedian Joe E. Lewis in The Joker Is Wild (1957); the song "All the Way" won the Academy Award for Best Original Song. By 1958, Sinatra was one of the ten biggest box office draws in the United States, appearing with Dean Martin and Shirley MacLaine in Vincente Minnelli's Some Came Running and Kings Go Forth (both 1958) with Tony Curtis and Natalie Wood. "High Hopes", sung by Sinatra in the Frank Capra comedy, A Hole in the Head (1959), won the Academy Award for Best Original Song, and became a chart hit, lasting on the Hot 100 for 17 weeks.

=== 1960–1980: Later career ===
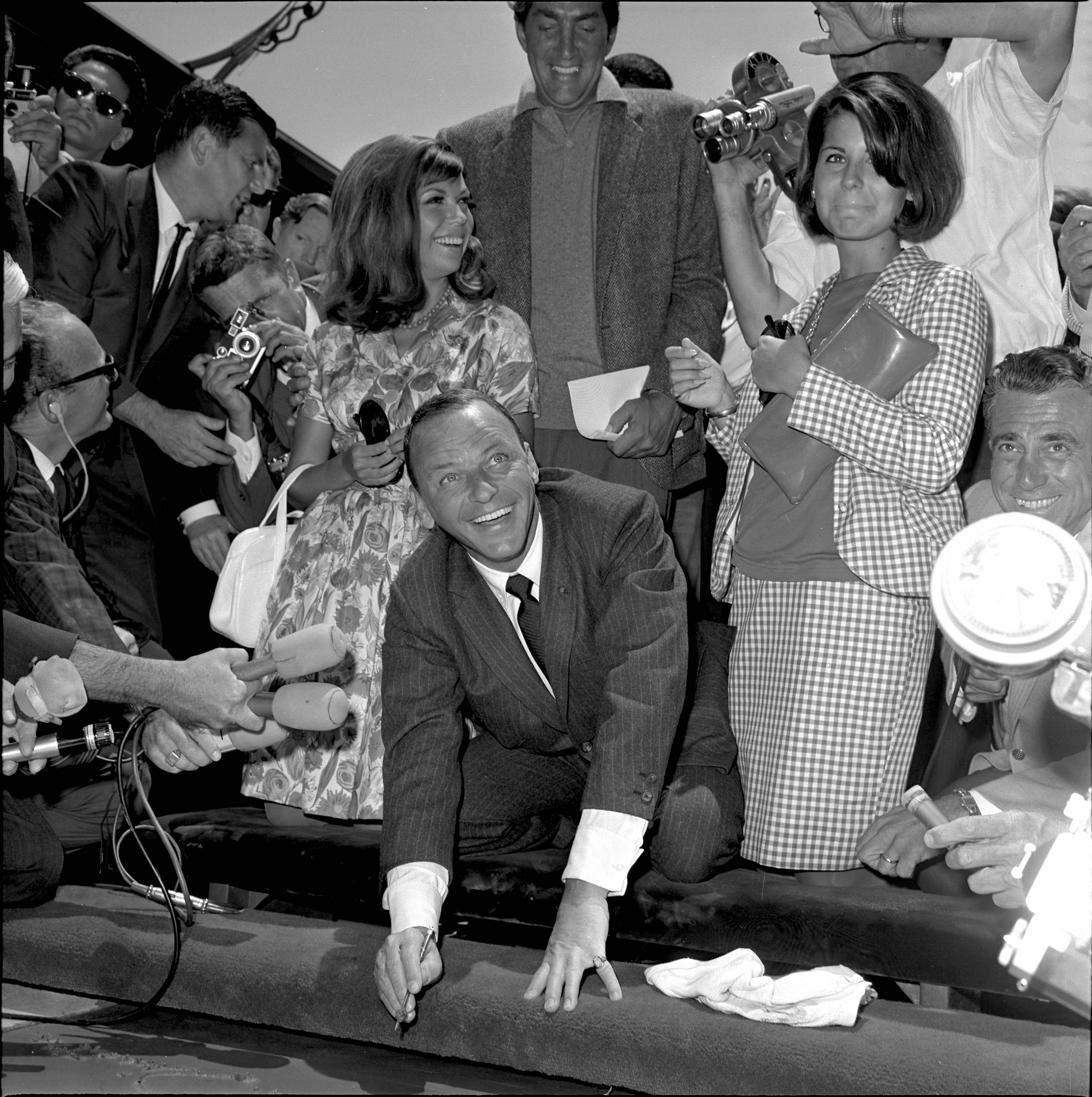
Sinatra leaving his signature in concrete at Grauman's Chinese Theatre in Hollywood, California on July 21, 1965

Due to an obligation Sinatra owed to 20th Century Fox for walking off the set of Henry King's Carousel (1956), he starred opposite Shirley MacLaine, Maurice Chevalier and Louis Jourdan in Can-Can (1960). Sinatra earned $200,000 and 25% of the profits for the performance. Around the same time, he starred in the Las Vegas-set Ocean's 11 (1960), the first film to feature the Rat Pack together and the start of a "new era of screen cool" for Santopietro. Sinatra personally financed the film and paid Martin and Davis fees of $150,000 and $125,000, respectively, sums considered exorbitant for the period. He had a leading role opposite Laurence Harvey in The Manchurian Candidate (1962), which Sinatra considered to be the role he was most excited about and the high point of his film career. Vincent Canby, writing for the magazine Variety, found the portrayal of Sinatra's character to be "a wide-awake pro creating a straight, quietly humorous character of some sensitivity." He appeared with the Rat Pack in the western Sergeants 3 (1962), and again in the 1964 gangster-oriented musical Robin and the 7 Hoods. For his performance in Come Blow Your Horn (1963), adapted from the Neil Simon play, Sinatra was nominated for the Golden Globe Award for Best Actor – Motion Picture Musical or Comedy.

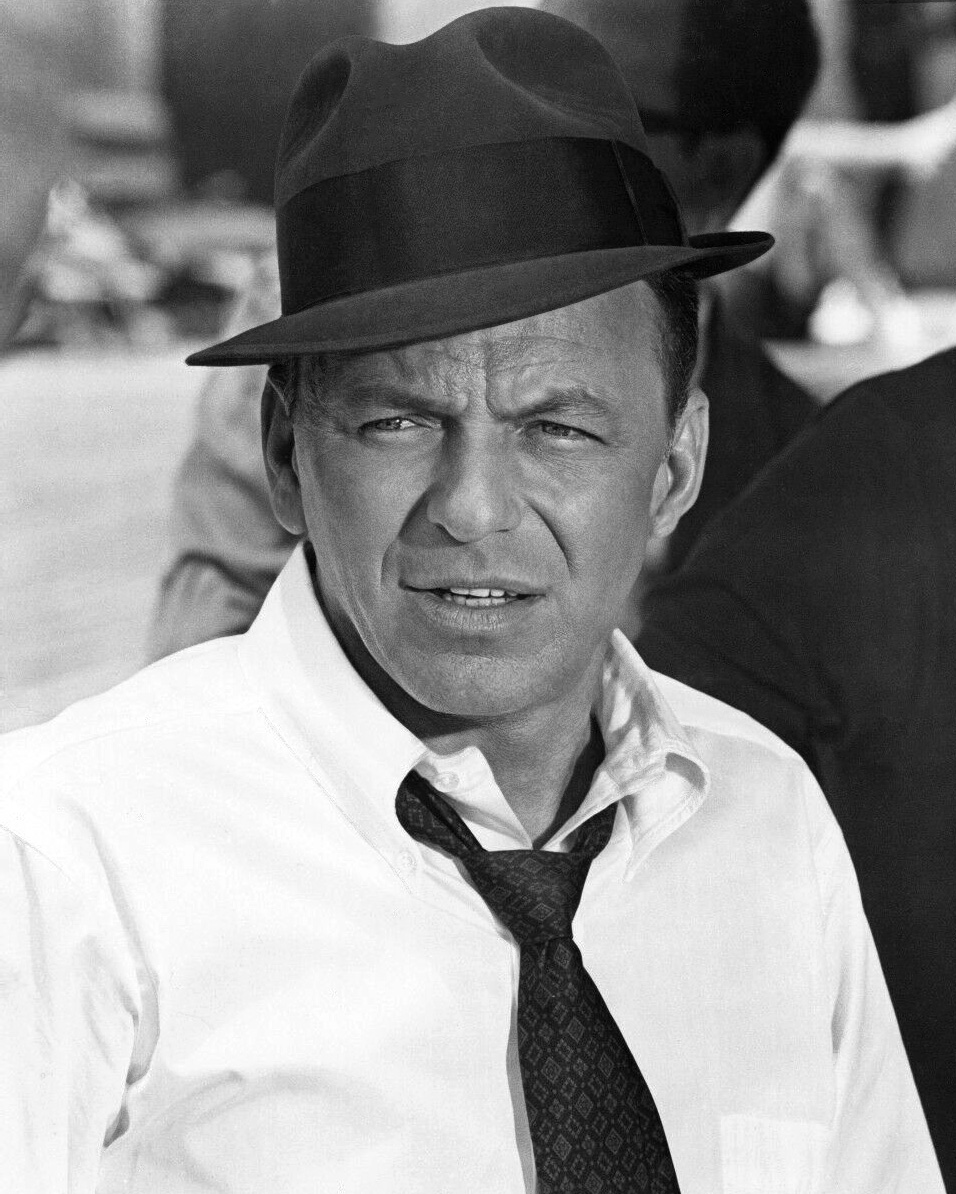
Sinatra in Tony Rome (1967)

Sinatra directed only one film, the anti-war American-Japanese co-production None but the Brave (released in 1965), which he also starred in and co-produced; he then starred in Von Ryan's Express (1965), another major success. In the late 1960s, he became known for playing detectives, including Tony Rome in Tony Rome (1967) and its sequel Lady in Cement (1968). Sinatra played a similar role in The Detective (1968). As Die Hard was based on the novel sequel to The Detective, 20th Century Fox was contractually obliged to offer Sinatra the lead role of John McClane. Sinatra, who was 70 years old at the time, declined.

Sinatra starred opposite George Kennedy in the western Dirty Dingus Magee (1970), an "abysmal" affair according to Santopietro, which was panned by the critics. The following year, Sinatra received a Golden Globe Cecil B. DeMille Award and had intended to play Detective Harry Callahan in Dirty Harry (1971), but had to turn down the role due to developing Dupuytren's contracture in his hand. Sinatra's last major film role was opposite Faye Dunaway in Brian G. Hutton's The First Deadly Sin (1980). Santopietro said that as a troubled New York City homicide cop, Sinatra gave an "extraordinarily rich", heavily layered characterization, one which "made for one terrific farewell" to his film career.

== Television and radio career ==
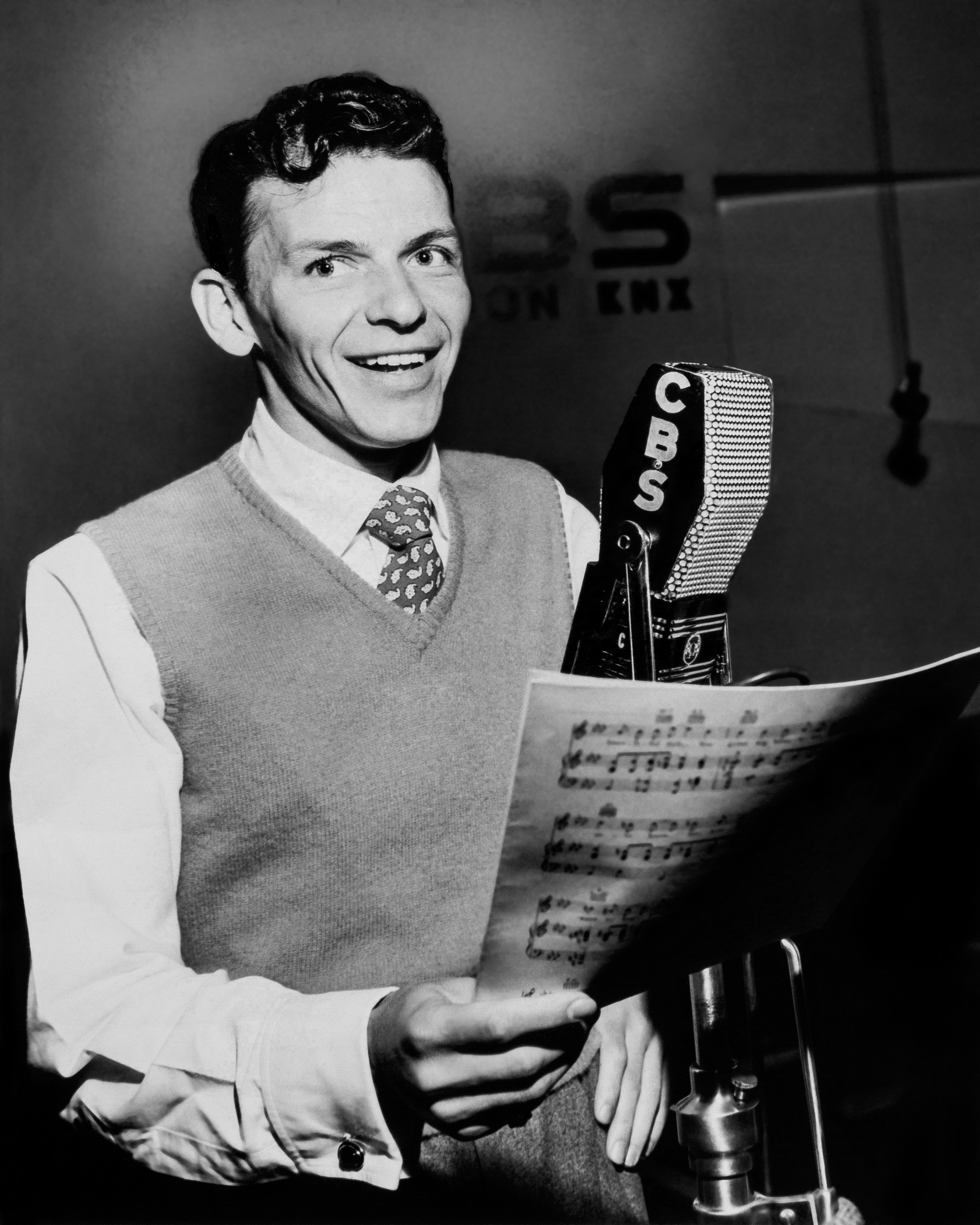
Sinatra on CBS Radio in 1944

After beginning on the Major Bowes Amateur Hour radio show with the Hoboken Four in 1935, and later WNEW and WAAT in Jersey City, Sinatra starred in his own radio shows on NBC and CBS from the early 1940s to the mid-1950s. In 1942, he hired arranger Axel Stordahl away from Tommy Dorsey before beginning his first radio program that year, keeping Stordahl with him for all of his radio work. By the end of 1942, Sinatra was named the "Most Popular Male Vocalist on Radio" in a DownBeat poll. Early on, he frequently worked with The Andrews Sisters on radio. They would appear as guests on each other's shows, as well as on many USO shows broadcast to troops via the Armed Forces Radio Service (AFRS). Sinatra appeared as a special guest in the sisters' ABC Eight-to-the-Bar Ranch series, while the trio in turn guested on his Songs by Sinatra series on CBS. Sinatra had two stints as a regular member of the cast of Your Hit Parade; (Note: Your Hit Parade was a popular weekly radio and television program from 1935 to 1958. Sponsored by American Tobacco Company's Lucky Strike brand of cigarettes, the show featured the top ten songs of each week.) his first was from 1943 to 1945, and second was from 1946 to May 28, 1949, during which Sinatra was paired with the then-new girl singer, Doris Day. Starting in September 1949, the BBD&O advertising agency produced a radio series starring Sinatra for Lucky Strike called Light Up Time – some 176 15-minute shows that featured him and Dorothy Kirsten singing – which lasted through to May 1950.

In October 1951, the second season of The Frank Sinatra Show began on CBS Television. Ultimately, Sinatra did not find the success on television for which he had hoped. (Note: Producer Irving Mansfield described Sinatra as being obsessed with the thought that his wife, Ava Gardner, was having an affair with her former husband, Artie Shaw. He often started shouting about this on the set of the television show when he phoned his home and could not reach Gardner. Mansfield had to communicate with Sinatra through the entourage that always accompanied him to CBS. Sinatra was always late to work and did not care to spend any time at rehearsal; he blamed all those connected with the program for the poor ratings it received. Mansfield was at his wits' end with Sinatra and his television show and quit the program. Mansfield informed him that he was a man of great talent but a failure as a person, which led to Sinatra attempting to angrily fire him. Mansfield replied that he was too late, as he had resigned that morning.) Santopietro writes that Sinatra "never appeared fully at ease on his own television series." In 1953 and 1954, Sinatra starred in the NBC radio program Rocky Fortune, portraying Rocco Fortunato (a.k.a. Rocky Fortune).

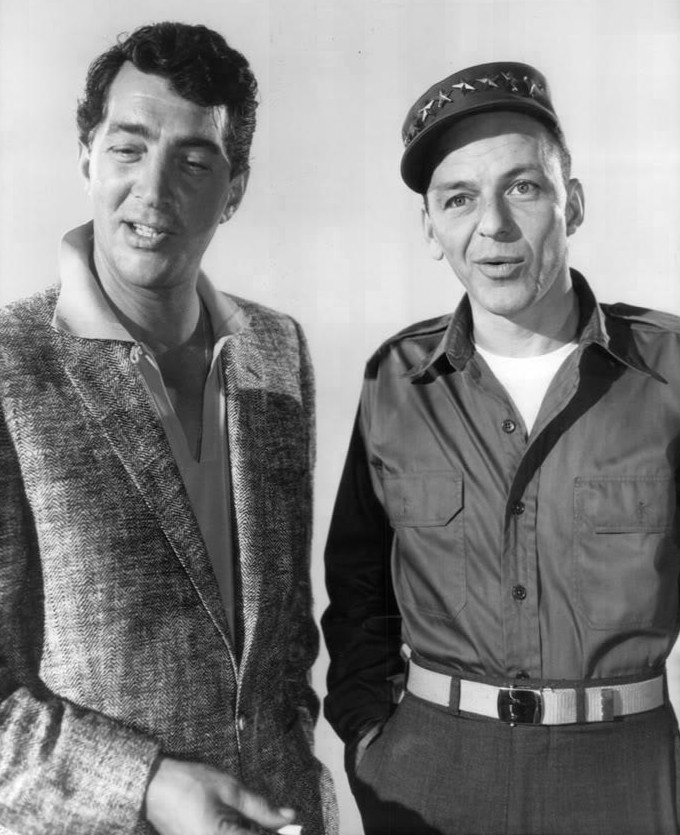
Dean Martin with Sinatra on The Dean Martin Show in 1958

In 1957, Sinatra formed a three-year, $3 million contract with ABC to launch The Frank Sinatra Show, featuring himself and guests in 36 half-hour shows. ABC agreed to allow Sinatra's Hobart Productions to keep 60% of the residuals and bought stock in Sinatra's film production unit, Kent Productions, guaranteeing him $7 million. Though an initial critical success upon its debut on October 18, 1957, it soon attracted negative reviews from Variety and The New Republic, and The Chicago Sun-Times thought that Sinatra and frequent guest Dean Martin "performed like a pair of adult delinquents", "sharing the same cigarette and leering at girls." Sinatra later made numerous appearances on The Dean Martin Show and Martin's TV specials.

Sinatra's fourth and final Timex TV special, Welcome Home Elvis, was broadcast in March 1960, earning massive viewing figures. During the show, he performed a duet with Presley, who sang Sinatra's 1957 hit "Witchcraft" with the host performing the 1956 Presley classic "Love Me Tender". Sinatra had previously been highly critical of Elvis Presley and rock and roll in the 1950s, describing it as a "deplorable, a rancid smelling aphrodisiac" that "fosters almost totally negative and destructive reactions in young people." (Note: Presley had responded to the criticism: "... [Sinatra] is a great success and a fine actor, but I think he shouldn't have said it ... [rock and roll] is a trend, just the same as he faced when he started years ago.") A CBS News special about Sinatra's 50th birthday, Frank Sinatra: A Man and His Music, was broadcast on November 16, 1965, and received an Emmy award and a Peabody Award.

Continuing his musical collaboration with Jobim and Ella Fitzgerald in 1967, Sinatra appeared in the TV special, A Man and His Music + Ella + Jobim, which was broadcast on CBS on November 13. When Sinatra came out of retirement in 1973, he appeared in a TV special that shared its title with his contemporaneously released album, Ol' Blue Eyes Is Back. In the late 1970s, John Denver appeared as a guest in the Sinatra and Friends ABC-TV Special, singing "September Song" as a duet.

Sinatra starred as a detective in Contract on Cherry Street (1977), cited as his "one starring role in a dramatic television film". Ten years later, Sinatra made a guest appearance opposite Tom Selleck in Magnum, P.I.. Shot in January 1987, the episode aired on CBS on February 25.

== Personal life ==
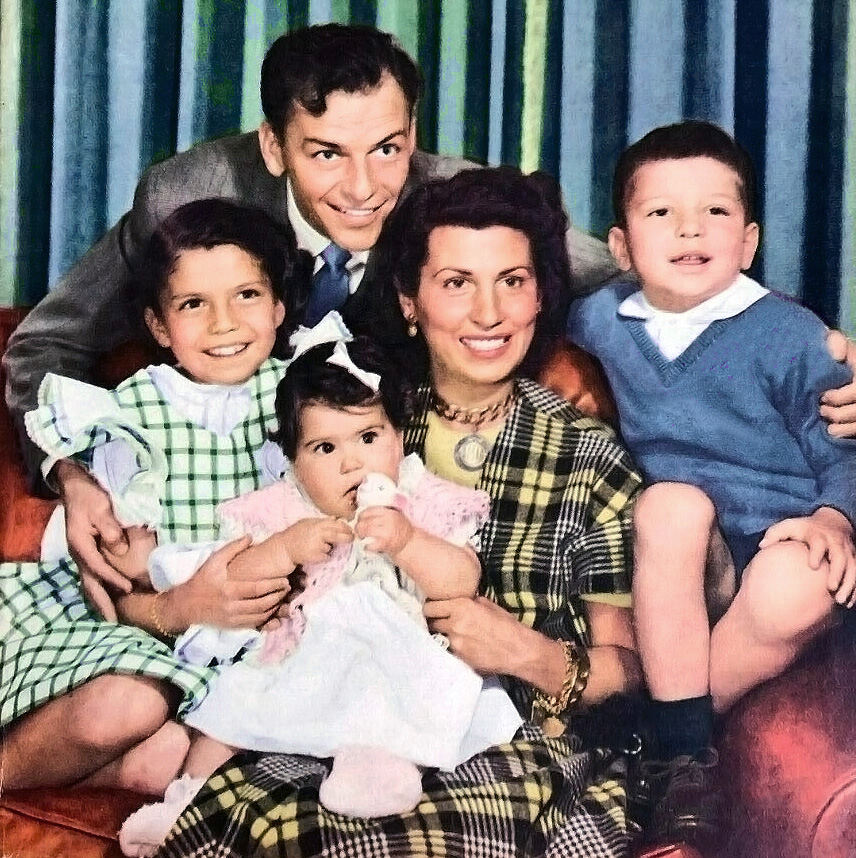
Family portrait, 1949. Sinatra with (from left) Nancy, Tina, Nancy Barbato and Frank Jr.

Sinatra was married to Nancy (née Barbato) from 1939 to 1951. They had three children: Nancy (born 1940), Frank Jr. (1944–2016) and Tina (born 1948).

Sinatra met Barbato in Long Branch, New Jersey, in the summer of 1934 while working as a lifeguard. He agreed to marry her after an incident at "The Rustic Cabin" that led to his arrest. (Note: While working at "The Rustic Cabin" in 1939, he became involved in a dispute between his girlfriend, Toni Della Penta, who suffered a miscarriage, and Nancy Barbato, a stonemason's daughter. After Della Penta attempted to tear off Barbato's dress, Sinatra ordered Barbato away and told Della Pinta that he would marry Barbato, several years his junior, because she was pregnant. Della Penta went to the police, and Sinatra was arrested on a morals charge for seduction. After a fight between Della Penta and Dolly, Della Penta was later arrested herself. Sinatra married Barbato that year, and Nancy Sinatra was born the following year.) Sinatra had numerous extramarital affairs, and gossip magazines published details of affairs with women including Marilyn Maxwell, Lana Turner and Joi Lansing. (Note: Turner later said the statements were not true in her 1992 autobiography, saying, "The closest things to dates Frank and I enjoyed were a few box lunches at MGM.")

Sinatra was married to Hollywood actress Ava Gardner from 1951 to 1957. It was a turbulent marriage with many well-publicized fights and altercations. The couple formally announced their separation on October 29, 1953, through MGM. Gardner filed for divorce in June 1954, at a time when she was dating matador Luis Miguel Dominguín, but the divorce was not settled until 1957. Sinatra continued to feel very strongly for her, and they remained lifelong friends.

In 1957, Sinatra moved to a home in Rancho Mirage, California, called The Compound.

Sinatra reportedly broke off engagements to Lauren Bacall in 1958 and Juliet Prowse in 1962. He was romantically linked to Marilyn Monroe, Pat Sheehan, Vikki Dougan, and Kipp Hamilton. Sinatra and Mia Farrow were married on July 19, 1966, and the couple divorced in August 1968. They remained close friends for life, and in a 2013 interview, Farrow said that Sinatra might be the father of her son Ronan Farrow (born 1987). In a 2015 CBS Sunday Morning interview, Nancy Sinatra dismissed the claim as "nonsense". She said that her father had a vasectomy years before Farrow's birth.

On July 11, 1976, Sinatra married Barbara Marx, former wife of Zeppo Marx, at Sunnylands, in Rancho Mirage, California, the estate of media magnate Walter Annenberg. They remained married until Sinatra's death in 1998.

Sinatra was close friends with Jilly Rizzo, songwriter Jimmy Van Heusen, golfer Ken Venturi, comedian Pat Henry, comedian Don Rickles, baseball manager Leo Durocher, and president John F. Kennedy (for whom he organized an inaugural ball with Peter Lawford). In his spare time, Sinatra enjoyed listening to classical music. He swam daily in the Pacific Ocean. Sinatra often played golf with Venturi at the course in Palm Springs, where he lived in the house Twin Palms he had commissioned from E. Stewart Williams in 1947 Sinatra liked painting, reading, and building model railways.

Although Sinatra was critical of the church on numerous occasions and had a pantheistic, Einstein-like view of God in his earlier life, Sinatra was inducted into the Catholic Sovereign Military Order of Malta in 1976, and turned to Catholicism for healing after his mother died in a plane crash in 1977. He died as a practicing Catholic and had a Catholic burial.

=== Style and personality ===
Sinatra was known for his immaculate sense of style. He spent lavishly on expensive custom-tailored tuxedos and stylish pin-striped suits, which made him feel wealthy and important and that he was giving his very best to the audience. Sinatra was also obsessed with cleanliness—while with the Tommy Dorsey band, he developed the nickname "Lady Macbeth" because of frequent showering and switching his outfits. Sinatra's deep blue eyes earned him the popular nickname "Ol' Blue Eyes".

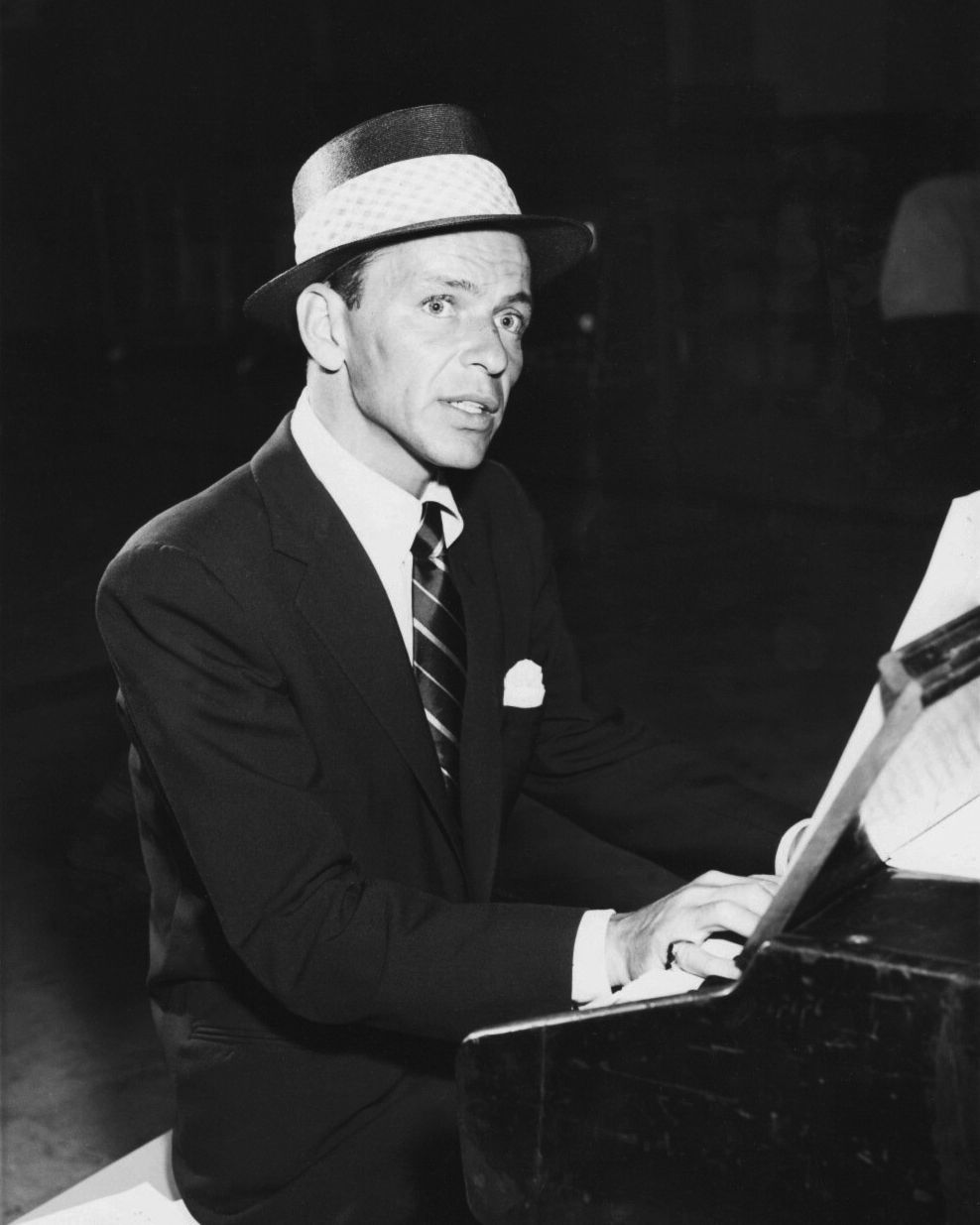
Sinatra in 1955

For Santopietro, Sinatra was the personification of America in the 1950s: "cocky, eye on the main chance, optimistic, and full of the sense of possibility." Barbara Sinatra wrote, "A big part of Frank's thrill was the sense of danger that he exuded, an underlying, ever-present tension only those closest to him knew could be defused with humor." Cary Grant, a friend of Sinatra, stated that Sinatra was the "most honest person he'd ever met", who spoke "a simple truth, without artifice which scared people", and was often moved to tears by his performances. Jo-Caroll Dennison commented that he possessed "great inner strength" and that his energy and drive were "enormous." A workaholic, Sinatra reportedly slept only four hours a night on average. Throughout his life, Sinatra had mood swings and bouts of mild to severe depression, stating to an interviewer in the 1950s that "I have an over-acute capacity for sadness as well as elation." Barbara Sinatra stated that he would "snap at anyone for the slightest misdemeanor", while Van Heusen said that when Sinatra got drunk, it was "best to disappear."

Sinatra's mood swings often developed into violence, directed at people he felt had crossed him, particularly journalists who gave him scathing reviews, publicists, and photographers. According to Rojek, Sinatra was "capable of deeply offensive behavior that smacked of a persecution complex." He received negative press for fights with Lee Mortimer in 1947, photographer Eddie Schisser in Houston in 1950, Judy Garland's publicist Jim Byron on the Sunset Strip in 1954, and for a confrontation with Washington Post journalist Maxine Cheshire in 1973, in which Sinatra implied that she was a cheap prostitute. (Note: Rojek states that Sinatra verbally assaulted Cheshire at a party in 1973, remarking, "Get away from me, you scum. Go home and take a bath ... You're nothing but a two-dollar cunt. You know what that means, don't you? You've been laying down for two dollars all your life". According to Rojek, Sinatra then proceeded to place two-dollar bills in her wine glass and remarked, "Here's two dollars, baby, that's what you're used to.") His feud with then-Chicago Sun Times columnist Mike Royko began when Royko wrote a column questioning why Chicago police offered free protection to Sinatra when he had his own security. Sinatra wrote an angry letter in response, calling Royko a "pimp" and threatening to "punch you in the mouth" for speculating that he wore a toupée. Arrangers such as Nelson Riddle and Anthony Fanzo found Sinatra to be a perfectionist, approaching him with uneasiness because of his often volatile temperament. Granata comments that Sinatra was so obsessed with perfection that people began wondering if he was more concerned about the music or showing off his power over others.

Sinatra was also known for his generosity, particularly after his comeback. Kelley notes that when Lee J. Cobb nearly died from a heart attack in June 1955, Sinatra flooded him with "books, flowers, delicacies", paid his hospital bills, and visited him daily, telling him that his "finest acting" was yet to come.

=== Alleged organized-crime links and Cal Neva Lodge ===
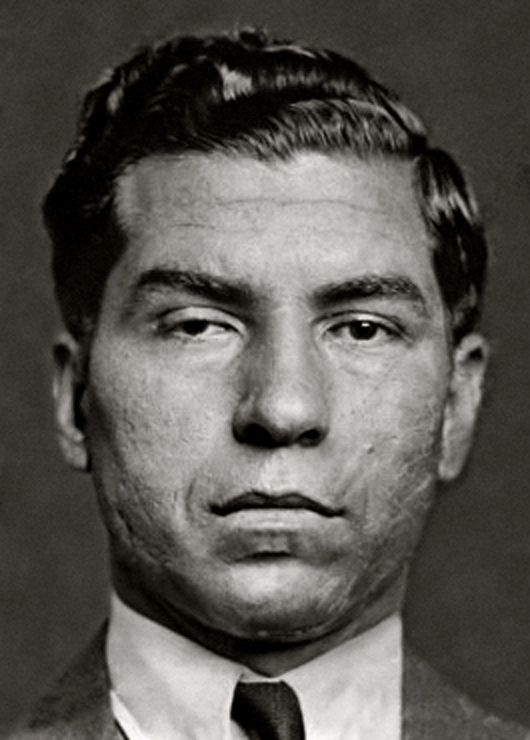
Mobster Lucky Luciano

Sinatra became the stereotype of the "tough working-class Italian American", something that he embraced. Sinatra said that if it had not been for his interest in music, he would have likely ended up in a life of crime. Willie Moretti was Sinatra's godfather and the notorious underboss of the Genovese crime family, and he helped Sinatra in exchange for kickbacks and was reported to have intervened in releasing Sinatra from his contract with Tommy Dorsey. Sinatra was present at the Mafia Havana Conference in 1946, and the press learned of his being there with Lucky Luciano. He was reported to be a good friend of mobster Sam Giancana. Sinatra sponsored the membership of mobster John Roselli, to the Friars Club.

In 1951 Sinatra was under investigation for his mafia links by the US Senate's Kefauver Committee, headed by Senator Estes Kefauver. At Kefauver's request, associate counsel Joseph L. Nellis interviewed him. At 4 AM on March 1, 1951, Nellis met Sinatra in an office at the top of the Rockefeller Center. Kefauver had come into possession of eight photographs of Sinatra with well-known mafia figures, including Lucky Luciano, and Charles and Rocco Fischetti. Sinatra admitted "knowing" or "seeing", and saying "hello" or "goodbye", to Lucky Luciano, the Fischetti brothers, Al Capone's cousins, Meyer Lansky, Frank Costello, Joe Adonis, Abner Zwillman, Willie Moretti, Gerardo Catena, and Bugsy Siegel, but denied having any business dealings with any of them. Nellis learnt nothing which would have enabled him to subpoena Sinatra before the official congressional hearings.

The FBI kept records amounting to 2,403 pages on Sinatra, who was a natural target with his Mafia ties, his ardent New Deal politics, and his friendship with John F. Kennedy. The FBI kept him under surveillance for almost five decades beginning in the 1940s. The documents include accounts of Sinatra as the target of death threats and extortion schemes. The FBI documented that Sinatra was losing esteem with the Mafia as he grew closer to President Kennedy, whose younger brother Attorney General Robert F. Kennedy was leading a crackdown on organized crime. Sinatra said he was not involved: "Any report that I fraternized with goons or racketeers is a vicious lie."

In 1960, Sinatra bought a share in the Cal Neva Lodge & Casino, a casino hotel on the north shore of Lake Tahoe. He built the Celebrity Room theater, which attracted his show business friends Red Skelton, Marilyn Monroe, Victor Borge, Joe E. Lewis, Lucille Ball, Lena Horne, Juliet Prowse, the McGuire Sisters, and others. By 1962, Sinatra reportedly held a 50-percent share in the hotel. His gambling license was temporarily suspended by the Nevada Gaming Control Board in 1963 after Giancana was spotted on the premises. (Note: According to Kelley, Giancana blamed Sinatra for the ordeal and was fuming at the abuse he had given to the commission's chairman Ed Olsen. The two men never spoke again.) Due to ongoing pressure from the FBI and Nevada Gaming Commission on mobster control of casinos, Sinatra agreed to give up his share in Cal Neva and the Sands. That same year, his son Frank Jr. was kidnapped but was eventually released unharmed. Sinatra's gambling license was restored in February 1981, following support from Ronald Reagan. In May 1968 he was observed dining at the Rive Gauche Restaurant with Allen Dorfman, I. Irving Davidson and Jimmy Hoffa's wife Josephine.

== Political views and activism ==
=== Jewish and racial advances ===
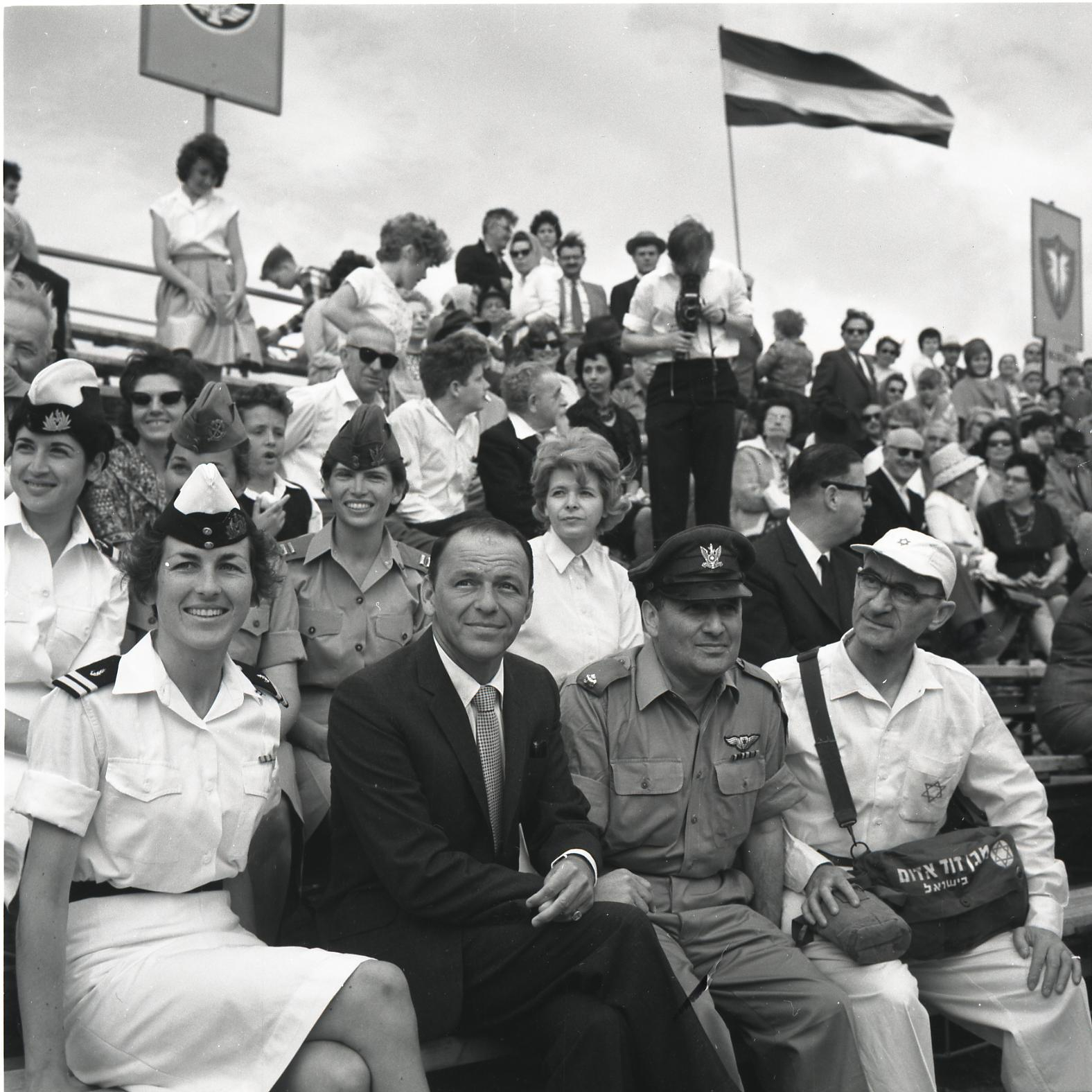
Sinatra watching an IDF military parade during a visit to Israel, 1962

Santopietro notes that Sinatra was a "lifelong sympathizer with Jewish causes." He was awarded the Hollzer Memorial Award by the Los Angeles Jewish Community in 1949. Sinatra gave a series of concerts in Israel in 1962 and donated his entire $50,000 fee for appearing in a cameo role in Cast a Giant Shadow (1966) to the Youth Center in Jerusalem. On November 1, 1972, Sinatra raised $6.5 million in bond pledges for Israel, and was given the Medallion of Valor. The Frank Sinatra Student Center at the Hebrew University of Jerusalem was dedicated in 1978.

Sinatra was outspoken against racism, particularly toward black people and Italians, from a young age. In the early 1950s, he was among those who campaigned to combine the racially segregated musicians' unions in Los Angeles. In November 1945, Sinatra was invited by the mayor of Gary, Indiana, to try to settle a strike by white students of Froebel High School against the "Pro-Negro" policies of the new principal. His comments, while praised by liberal publications, led to accusations by some that he was a communist, which Sinatra denied.

From his youth, Sinatra displayed sympathy for black Americans and worked both publicly and privately all his life to help the struggle for equal rights. He blamed racial prejudice on the parents of children. Sinatra played a major role in the desegregation of Nevada hotels and casinos in the 1950s and 1960s. On January 27, 1961, Sinatra played a benefit show at Carnegie Hall for Martin Luther King Jr. and led his fellow Rat Pack members and Reprise label mates in boycotting hotels and casinos that refused entry to black patrons and performers. According to his son, Frank Jr., King sat weeping in the audience at one of his father's concerts in 1963 as Sinatra sang "Ol' Man River", a song from the musical Show Boat that is sung by a black American stevedore.

=== Support of presidential campaigns ===
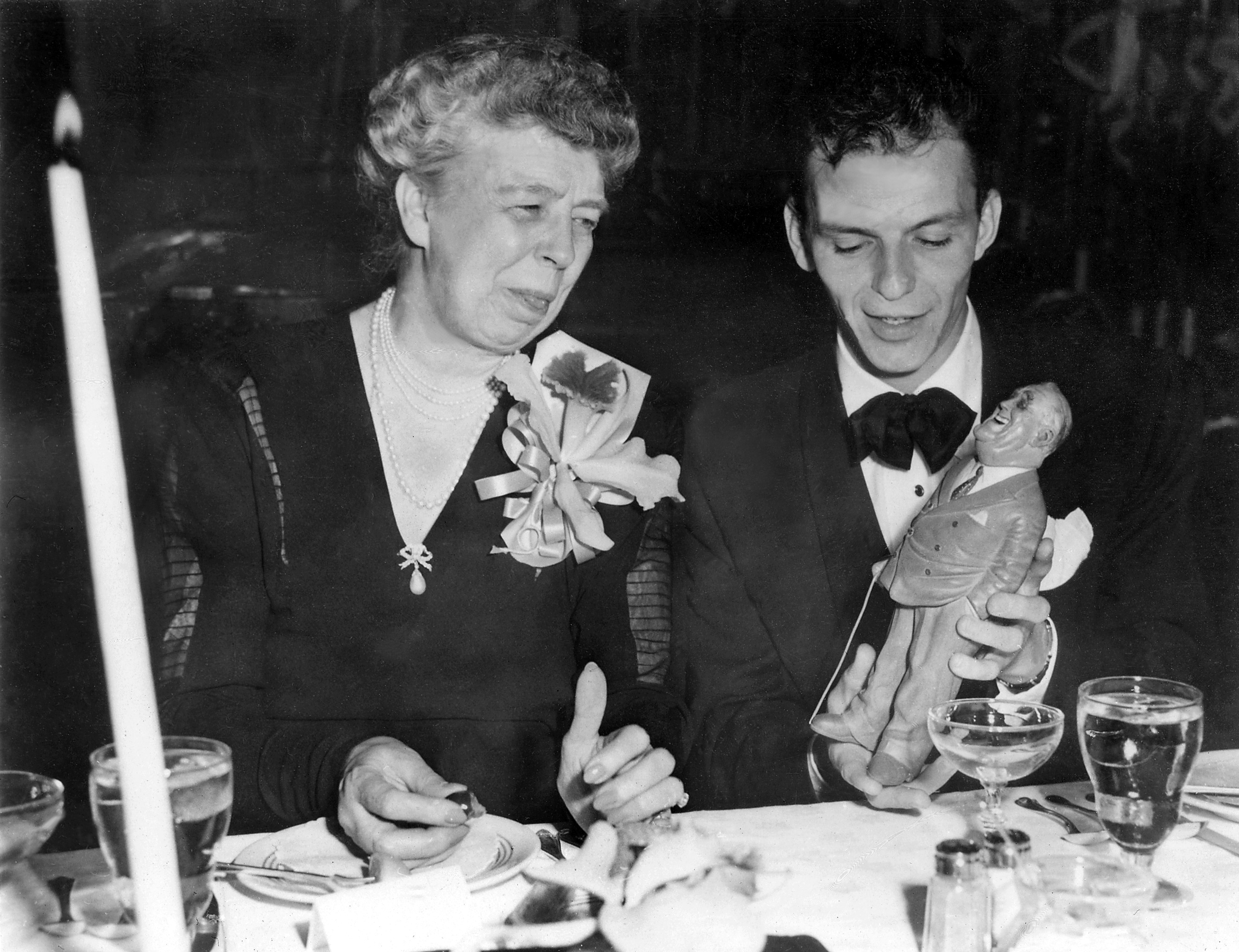
Sinatra, pictured with former First Lady Eleanor Roosevelt in 1947, was an ardent supporter of the Democratic Party until the early 1970s.

His mother, Dolly, was a Democratic Party ward leader. After meeting President Franklin D. Roosevelt in 1944, Sinatra subsequently heavily campaigned for the Democrats in the 1944 presidential election. According to Jo Carroll Silvers, in his younger years, Sinatra had "ardent liberal" sympathies and was "so concerned about poor people that he was always quoting Henry Wallace." In the 1948 presidential election, he actively campaigned for President Harry S. Truman. In 1952 and 1956, Sinatra campaigned for Adlai Stevenson.

Of all the U.S. presidents Sinatra associated with during his career, he was closest to John F. Kennedy. Sinatra often invited Kennedy to Hollywood and Las Vegas, and the two would womanize and enjoy parties together. In January 1961, Sinatra and Peter Lawford organized the Inaugural Gala in Washington, D.C., held on the evening before President Kennedy was sworn into office. After taking office, Kennedy distanced himself from Sinatra due partly to Sinatra's ties with the Mafia. In 1962, Sinatra was snubbed by the President as, during his visit to Palm Springs, Kennedy stayed with the Republican Bing Crosby instead of Sinatra, citing FBI concerns about the latter's alleged connections to organized crime. (Note: Kennedy was strongly advised by Henry E. Petersen, a senior official of the Justice Department, to avoid staying with Sinatra.) Sinatra had spared no expense upgrading the facilities at his home in anticipation of the President's visit, fitting it with a heliport, which he smashed with a sledgehammer after the rejection. Despite the snub, when Sinatra learned of Kennedy's assassination, he reportedly sobbed in his bedroom for three days. (Note: When Sinatra learned that Kennedy's killer Lee Harvey Oswald had watched Suddenly just days before the assassination, he withdrew it from circulation, and it only became distributed again in the late 1980s.) Sinatra worked with Hubert H. Humphrey in 1968, and remained a supporter of the Democratic Party until the early 1970s.

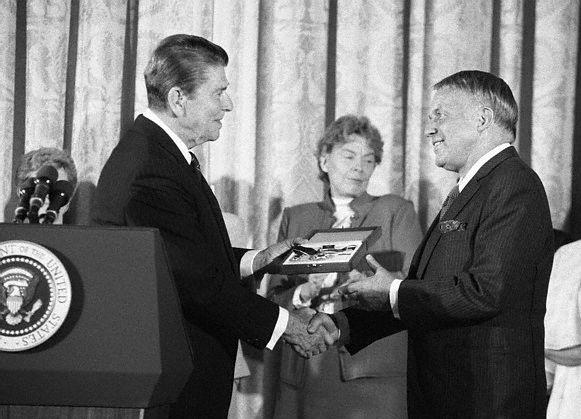
Sinatra being awarded the Presidential Medal of Freedom by President Ronald Reagan in 1985.

Although still a registered Democrat, Sinatra endorsed Republican Ronald Reagan for a second term as governor of California in 1970. Sinatra officially changed allegiance in July 1972 when he supported Richard Nixon in the 1972 presidential election.

In the 1980 presidential election, Sinatra raised $4 million for Ronald Reagan's campaign. Sinatra arranged Reagan's Presidential gala, as he had done for Kennedy. In 1985, Reagan presented Sinatra with the Presidential Medal of Freedom, remarking, "His love of country, his generosity for those less fortunate ... make him one of our most remarkable and distinguished Americans." On June 18, 1984, Sinatra performed at the state dinner in the White House honoring Sri Lankan president J. R. Jayewardene at the invitation of Reagan, singing "Strangers in the Night" and "Fly Me to the Moon".

== Death and funeral ==
Fans covered flowers on Sinatra's star on the Hollywood Walk of Fame after he died in 1998

During the final years of his life, Sinatra was in ill health and was frequently hospitalized for heart and breathing problems, high blood pressure, pneumonia, and bladder cancer. He made no public appearances following a heart attack in February 1997. On the evening of May 14, 1998, Sinatra died in his sleep at age 82 after suffering another heart attack at Cedars-Sinai Medical Center in Los Angeles, with his wife Barbara at his side. Barbara encouraged Sinatra to "fight" while attempts were made to stabilize him, and reported that Sinatra's final words were, "I'm losing." His daughter, Tina, later wrote that she and her siblings had not been notified of their father's final hospitalization, and it was her belief that "the omission was deliberate. Barbara would be the grieving widow alone at her husband's side." The night after Sinatra's death, the lights on the Empire State Building were turned blue, the lights at the Las Vegas Strip were dimmed, and the casinos stopped spinning for one minute. Significant increases in recording sales worldwide were reported by Billboard in the month of Sinatra's death.

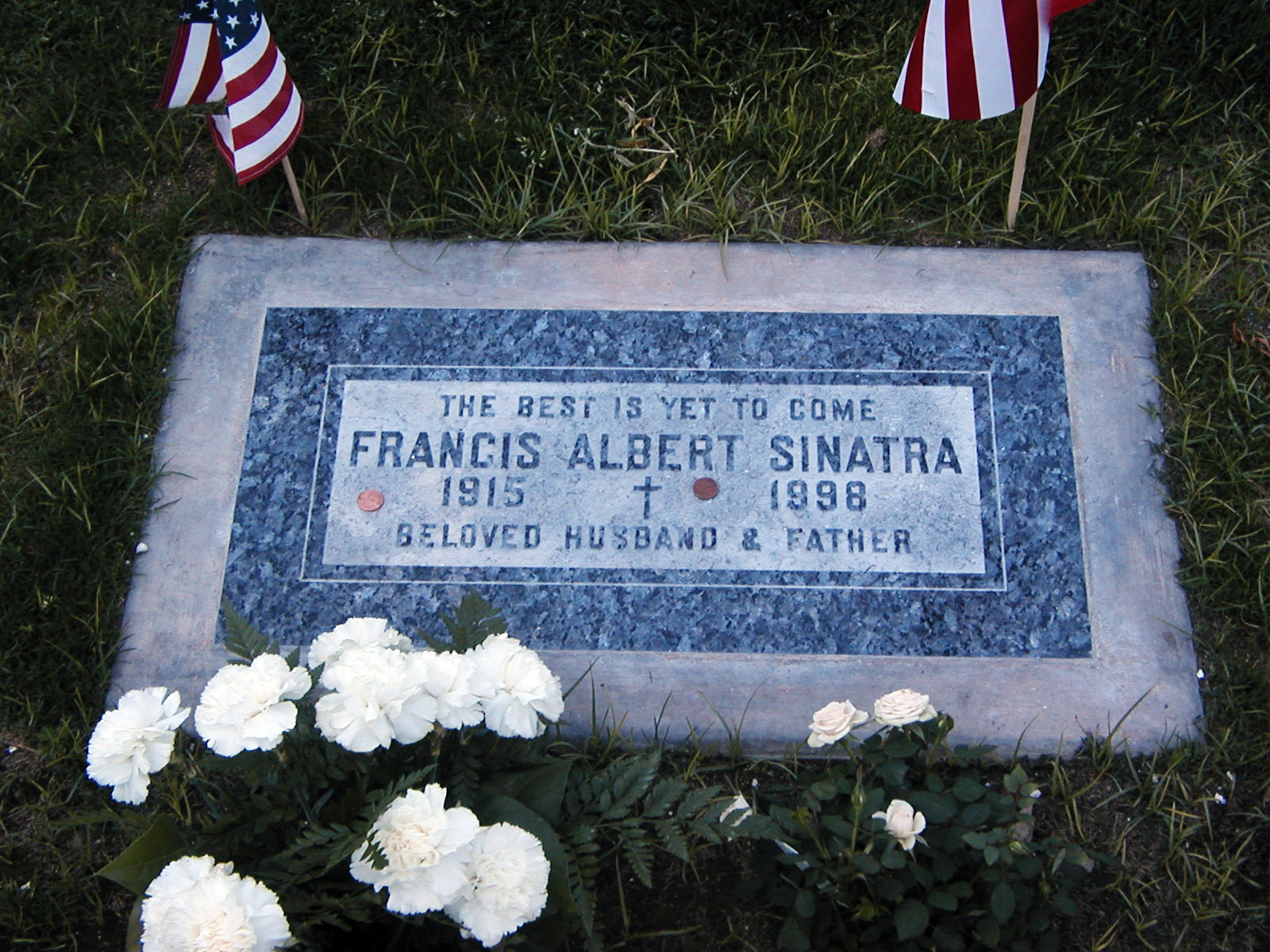
Sinatra's grave, as seen in 2004, located at Desert Memorial Park in Cathedral City, California (gravestone replaced in 2021)

Sinatra's funeral was held at the Church of the Good Shepherd in Beverly Hills, California, on May 20, 1998, with 400 mourners in attendance and thousands of fans outside. Gregory Peck, Tony Bennett, and Sinatra's son, Frank Jr., addressed the mourners.

Sinatra was buried in a blue business suit and a red and blue necktie because of his support for the Italian football club Genoa CFC; his grave, adorned with mementos from family members, was next to his parents in Desert Memorial Park in Cathedral City, California. The phrases "The Best Is Yet to Come", and "Beloved Husband & Father" were placed on Sinatra's modest grave marker. Sinatra's gravestone was changed as of 2021 to read "Sleep Warm, Poppa", due to damage to the original gravestone.

== Legacy and honors ==
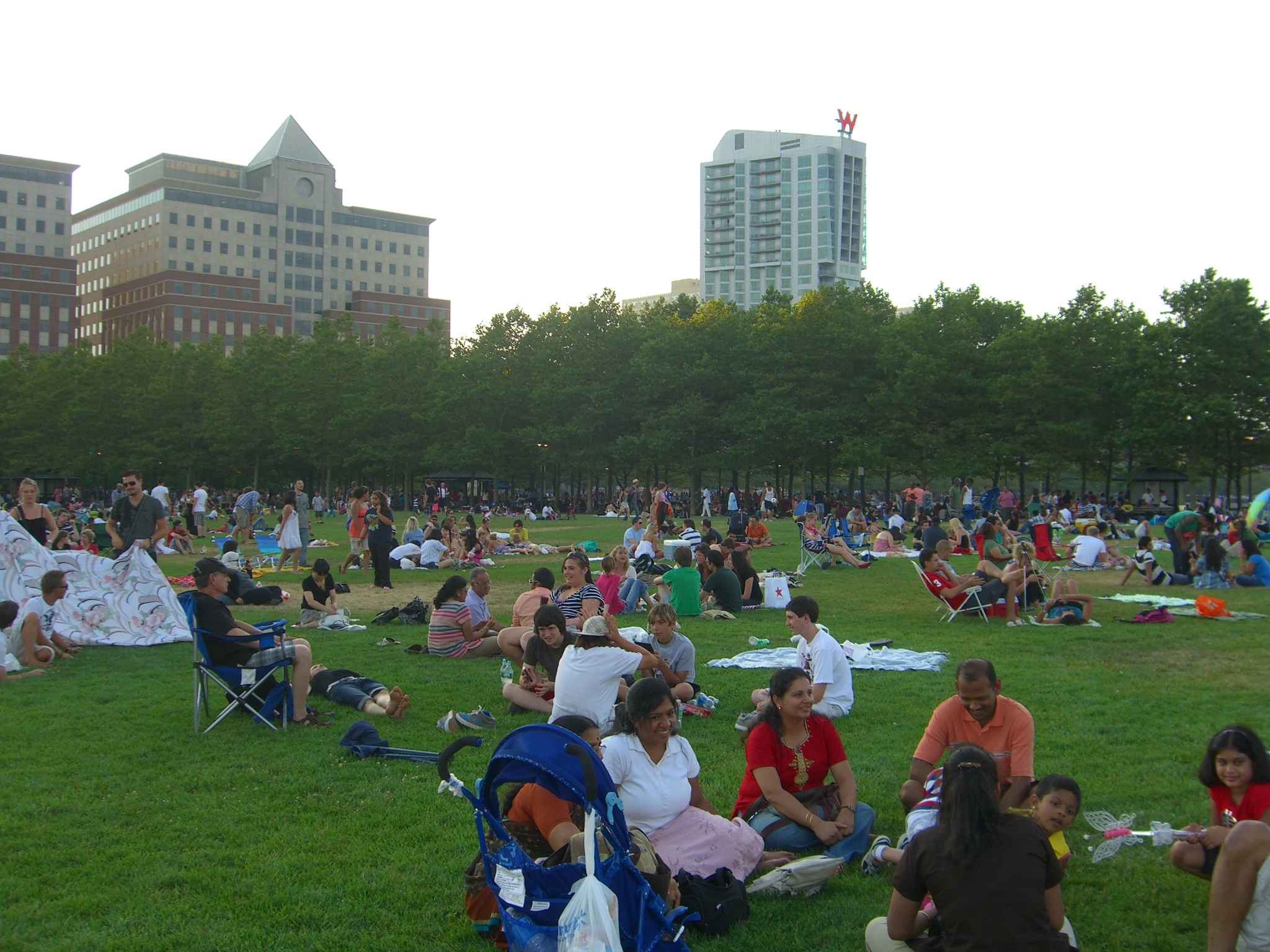
Frank Sinatra Park on the Hudson River Waterfront Walkway, 4th of July, 2010

Robert Christgau referred to Sinatra as "the greatest singer of the 20th century". For Santopietro, Sinatra was the "greatest male pop singer in the history of America", who amassed "unprecedented power onscreen and off", and "seemed to exemplify the common man, an ethnic twentieth-century American male who reached the 'top of the heap', yet never forgot his roots." Santopietro argues that his career was centered around power, perfecting the ability to capture an audience. He continues to be regarded as an iconic figure of the 20th century.

Gus Levene commented that Sinatra's strength was that when it came to lyrics, telling a story musically, Sinatra displayed a "genius" ability and feeling, which with the "rare combination of voice and showmanship" made him the "original singer" which others who followed most tried to emulate. George Roberts, a trombonist in Sinatra's band, remarked that Sinatra had a "charisma, or whatever it is about him, that no one else had." Biographer Arnold Shaw considered that "If Las Vegas had not existed, Sinatra could have invented it." He quoted reporter James Bacon in saying that Sinatra was the "swinging image on which the town is built", adding that no other entertainer quite "embodied the glamour" associated with Las Vegas.

In Sinatra's native Hoboken, he was awarded the Key to the City on October 30, 1947. In 2003, the city's main post office was rededicated in his honor. A bronze plaque, placed two years before Sinatra's death, marks the site of the house where he was born. There is also a marker in front of Hoboken Historical Museum, which has artifacts from his life and conducts Sinatra walking tours. Frank Sinatra Drive runs parallel to the Hudson River Waterfront Walkway. On the waterfront is Frank Sinatra Park, where a bronze plaque was placed in 1989 upon its opening, and where a 6-foot (1.8 m) tall bronze statue of Sinatra was dedicated in 2021 on December 12, Sinatra's birthday. A residence hall at Montclair State University in New Jersey was named in his honor. Other buildings named for Sinatra include the Frank Sinatra School of the Arts in Astoria, Queens, the Frank Sinatra International Student Center at Hebrew University in Jerusalem, and the Frank Sinatra Hall at the USC School of Cinematic Arts in Los Angeles. Wynn Resorts' Encore Las Vegas resort features a restaurant dedicated to Sinatra which opened in 2008. There are several roadways named in honor of Frank Sinatra in several states of the U.S.

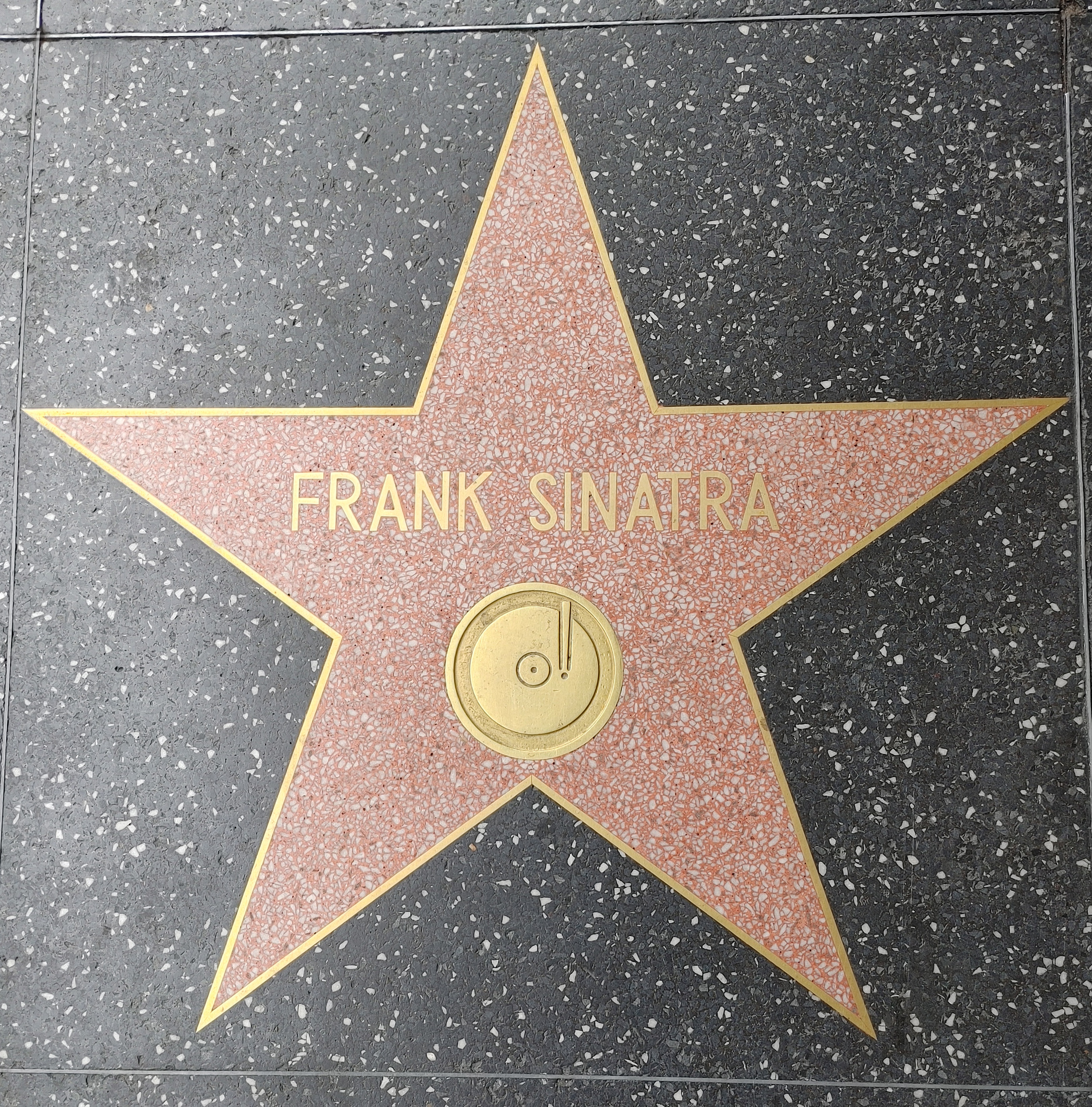
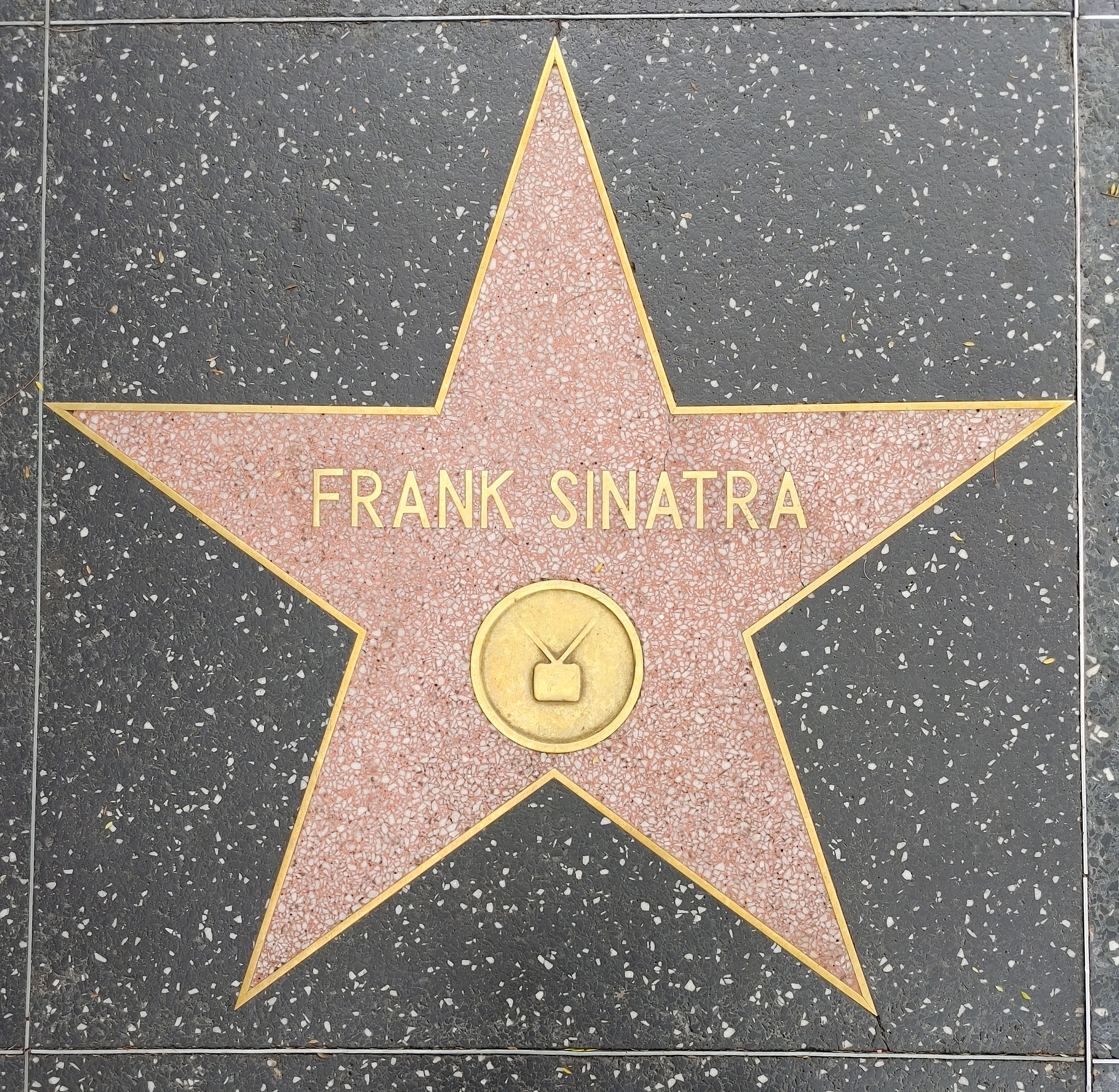
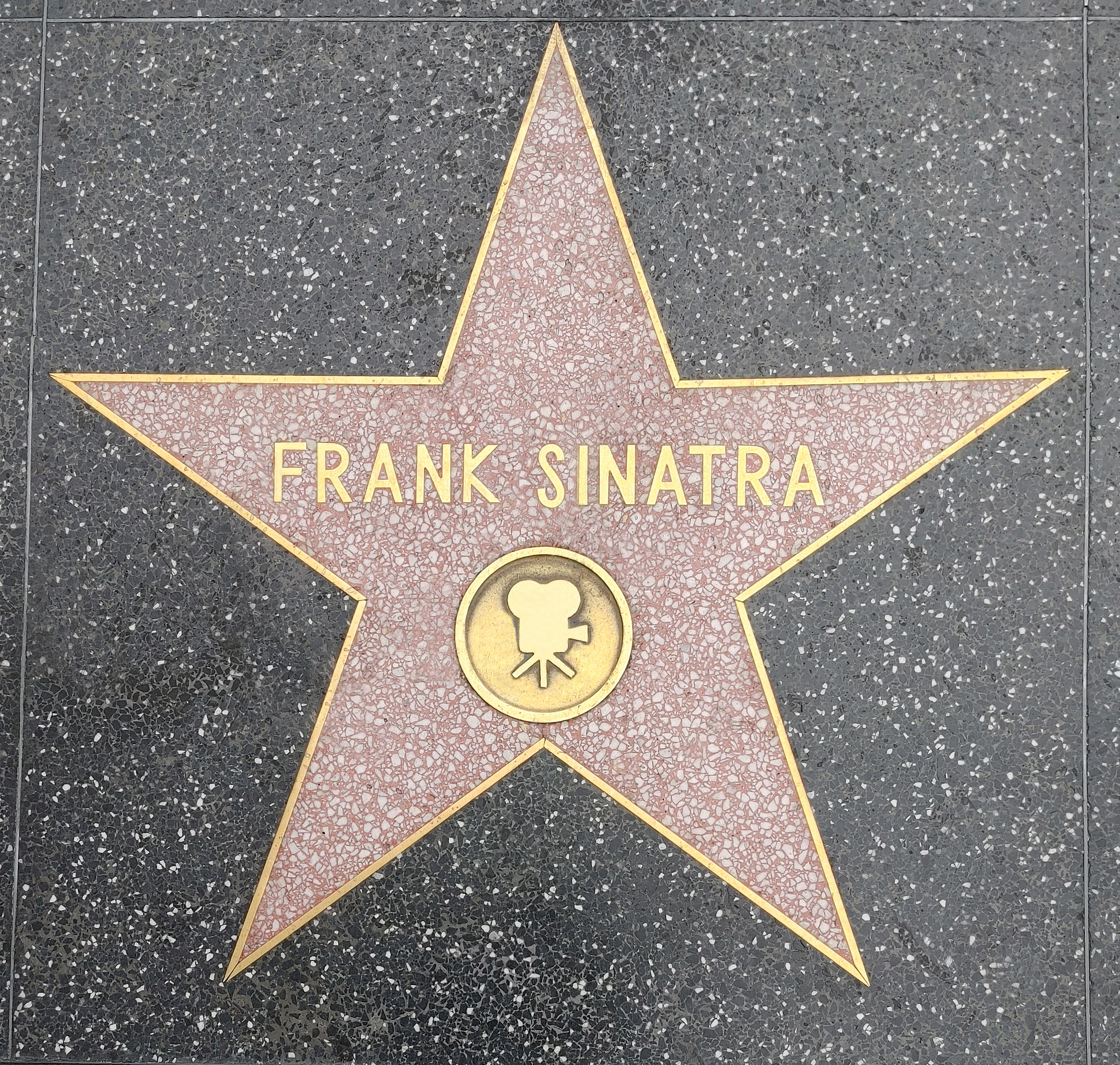
Sinatra's three stars for recording, television, and motion pictures on the Hollywood Walk of Fame in Los Angeles

The United States Postal Service issued a stamp in honor of Sinatra in May 2008, commemorating the tenth anniversary of his death. In May 2008, the United States Congress designated May 13 as Frank Sinatra Day.

Sinatra received three honorary degrees during his lifetime. In May 1976, he was invited to speak at the University of Nevada, Las Vegas graduation commencement and was bestowed an Honorary Doctorate litterarum humanarum. During his speech, Sinatra stated that his education had come from "the school of hard knocks" and that "this is the first educational degree I have ever held in my hand. I will never forget what you have done for me today". In 1984 and 1985, Sinatra received an Honorary Doctorate of Fine Arts from Loyola Marymount University and an Honorary Doctorate of Engineering from the Stevens Institute of Technology.

In 2023, Rolling Stone ranked Sinatra at No. 19 on their list of the 200 Greatest Singers of All Time.

In 2024, a new road in North Bristol was named Sinatra Way, to commemorate Sinatra's 1953 visit to Frenchay Hospital.

=== Tribute albums to Sinatra ===
- A Jazz Portrait of Frank Sinatra by Oscar Peterson (1959)
- Very Sinatra by Ruby Braff (1981)
- Perfectly Frank by Tony Bennett (1992)
- Voices in Standard by The Four Freshmen (1994)
- As I Remember It by Frank Sinatra, Jr. (1996)
- Blue Note Plays Sinatra various jazz musicians - (1996)
- Manilow Sings Sinatra by Barry Manilow (1998)
- Sinatraland by Patrick Williams and His Big Band (1998)
- Blue Eyes Plays Ol' Blue Eyes by Si Zentner & Orchestra (1998)
- Keely Sings Sinatra by Keely Smith (2001)
- Michael Andrew Pays Tribute to Frank Sinatra by Michael Andrew (2002)
- Frank by Amy Winehouse [2003]
- Steve Lawrence Sings Sinatra by Steve Lawrence (2003)
- Plays Sinatra His Way by Joey DeFrancesco (2004)
- Allow Us to Be Frank by Westlife (2004)
- Songs of Sinatra by Steve Tyrell (2005)
- Blue Eyes Meets Bed-Stuy The Notorious B.I.G. & Frank Sinatra by Jon Moskowitz and Dj Cappel & Smitty (2005)
- L'allieva by Mina (2005)
- Bolton Swings Sinatra by Michael Bolton (2006)
- Dear Mr. Sinatra by John Pizzarelli (2006)
- Ray Stevens Sings Sinatra...Say What?? by Ray Stevens (2008)
- His Way, Our Way by various artists (2009)
- Cauby Sings Sinatra by Cauby Peixoto (2010)
- Sin-Atra a heavy metal tribute by various artists (2011)
- Cicero Sings Sinatra by Roger Cicero (2014)
- Daniel Boaventura Sings Frank Sinatra (Ao Vivo) (2015)
- Let's Be Frank by Trisha Yearwood (2018)
- My Way by Willie Nelson (2018)
- That's Life by Willie Nelson (2021)
- Mark Tremonti Sings Frank Sinatra by Mark Tremonti (2022)
- Lush Life: The Lost Sinatra Arrangements by Seth MacFarlane (2025)

== Film, television and stage portrayals ==
A television miniseries based on Sinatra's life, titled Sinatra, was aired by CBS in 1992. The series was directed by James Steven Sadwith, who won an Emmy Award for Outstanding Individual Achievement in Directing for a Miniseries or a Special and starred Philip Casnoff as Sinatra. Sinatra was written by Abby Mann and Philip Mastrosimone and produced by Sinatra's daughter, Tina.

Sinatra has subsequently been portrayed on screen by Ray Liotta (The Rat Pack, 1998), James Russo (Stealing Sinatra, 2003), Dennis Hopper (The Night We Called It a Day, 2003), and Robert Knepper (My Way, 2012), and spoofed by Joe Piscopo and Phil Hartman on Saturday Night Live. A biographical film directed by Martin Scorsese has long been planned. Alex Gibney directed a four-part biographical series on Sinatra, All or Nothing at All, for HBO in 2015. A musical tribute was aired on CBS television in December 2015 to mark Sinatra's centenary. Sinatra was also portrayed by Rico Simonini in the 2018 feature film Frank & Ava, which is based on a play by Willard Manus. Creed singer Scott Stapp also portrayed Sinatra in the 2024 feature film Reagan, a biopic of U.S. President Ronald Reagan. Martin Scorsese planned to make a film on Sinatra and his second wife Ava Gardner.

In 2021, Sinatra was portrayed by actor Frank John Hughes in the Paramount+ limited series, The Offer.

Sinatra believed that Johnny Fontane, a mob-associated singer in Mario Puzo's novel The Godfather (1969), was based on him. Puzo wrote in 1972 that when the author and singer met in Chasen's, Sinatra "started to shout abuse", threatening violence. Francis Ford Coppola, director of the film adaptation, said in the audio commentary that "Obviously Johnny Fontane was inspired by a kind of Frank Sinatra character".

In 2023, Sinatra: The Musical by Joe DiPietro premiered at the Birmingham Repertory Theatre starring Matt Doyle as Sinatra.

== Selected discography ==
Studio albums

- The Voice of Frank Sinatra (1946)
- Songs by Sinatra (1947)
- Christmas Songs by Sinatra (1948)
- Frankly Sentimental (1949)
- Dedicated to You (1950)
- Sing and Dance with Frank Sinatra (1950)
- Songs for Young Lovers (1954)
- Swing Easy! (1954)
- In the Wee Small Hours (1955)
- Songs for Swingin' Lovers! (1956)
- This Is Sinatra! (1956)
- Close to You (1957)
- A Swingin' Affair! (1957)
- Where Are You? (1957)
- A Jolly Christmas from Frank Sinatra (1957)
- Come Fly with Me (1958)
- Frank Sinatra Sings for Only the Lonely (1958)
- Come Dance with Me! (1959)
- No One Cares (1959)
- This Is Sinatra Volume 2 (1959)
- Nice 'n' Easy (1960)
- Sinatra's Swingin' Session!!! (1961)
- Ring-a-Ding-Ding! (1961)
- Come Swing with Me! (1961)
- Swing Along With Me (1961)
- I Remember Tommy (1961)
- Sinatra and Strings (1962)
- Point of No Return (1962)
- Sinatra and Swingin' Brass (1962)
- All Alone (1962)
- Sinatra Sings Great Songs from Great Britain (1962)
- The Concert Sinatra (1963)
- Sinatra's Sinatra (1963)
- Sinatra Sings Days of Wine and Roses, Moon River, and Other Academy Award Winners (1964)
- Softly, as I Leave You (1964)
- September of My Years (1965)
- My Kind of Broadway (1965)
- A Man and His Music (1965)
- Sinatra '65: The Singer Today (1965)
- Moonlight Sinatra (1966)
- Strangers in the Night (1966)
- That's Life (1966)
- The World We Knew (1967)
- Cycles (1968)
- My Way (1969)
- A Man Alone (1969)
- Watertown (1970)
- Ol' Blue Eyes Is Back (1973)
- Some Nice Things I've Missed (1974)
- Trilogy: Past Present Future (1980)
- She Shot Me Down (1981)
- L.A. Is My Lady (1984)
- Duets (1993)
- Duets II (1994)

Collaboration albums

- Sinatra–Basie: An Historic Musical First with Count Basie (1962)
- America, I Hear You Singing with Bing Crosby and Fred Waring (1964)
- It Might as Well Be Swing with Count Basie (1964)
- 12 Songs of Christmas with Bing Crosby and Fred Waring (1964)
- Francis Albert Sinatra & Antonio Carlos Jobim with Antonio Carlos Jobim (1967)
- Francis A. & Edward K. with Duke Ellington (1968)
- The Sinatra Family Wish You a Merry Christmas with Frank Sinatra Jr., Nancy Sinatra and Tina Sinatra (1968)
- Sinatra & Company with Antonio Carlos Jobim (1971)

== See also ==
- Frank Sinatra bibliography
- Frank Sinatra's recorded legacy
- The Frank Sinatra Show (radio program)

== Sources ==
- Ackelson, Richard W. (1992). Frank Sinatra: a complete recording history of techniques, songs, composers, lyricists, arrangers, sessions, and first-issue albums, 1939–1984. McFarland. ISBN 978-0-89950-554-1. Archived from the original on April 29, 2016.
- Ainlay, Thomas; Gabaldon, Judy Dixon (2003). Las Vegas: The Fabulous First Century. Arcadia Publishing. ISBN 978-0-7385-2416-0. Archived from the original on April 29, 2016.
- Anastasia, George; Macnow, Glen; Pistone, Joe (2011). The Ultimate Book of Gangster Movies: Featuring the 100 Greatest Gangster Films of All Time. Running Press. ISBN 978-0-7624-4154-9. Archived from the original on April 29, 2016.
- Andrews, Maxene; Gilbert, Bill (1993). Over Here, Over There: The Andrews Sisters and the USO Stars in World War II. Thorndike Press. ISBN 978-0-7862-0094-8. Archived from the original on April 29, 2016.
- Anka, Paul; Dalton, David (2013). My Way: An Autobiography. Macmillan. ISBN 978-1-250-03520-2. Archived from the original on October 30, 2021.
- Avant-Mier, Roberto (May 6, 2010). Rock the Nation: Latin/o Identities and the Latin Rock Diaspora. Bloomsbury Publishing. ISBN 978-1-4411-6797-2. Archived from the original on April 29, 2016.
- Bogdanov, Vladimir; Woodstra, Chris; Erlewine, Stephen Thomas (2002). All Music Guide to Jazz: The Definitive Guide to Jazz Music. Backbeat Books. ISBN 978-0-87930-717-2.
- Booker, Janice T. (2004). "Why the Bobby Soxers?". In Pugliese, Stanislao G. (ed.). Frank Sinatra: History, Identity, and Italian American Culture. St. Martin's Press. ISBN 978-1-4039-6655-1.
- Bret, David (2014). Doris Day: A Reluctant Star. Aurum Press Limited. ISBN 978-1-78131-351-0. Archived from the original on October 30, 2021.
- Brooks, Patricia; Brooks, Jonathan (2006). Laid to Rest in California: A Guide to the Cemeteries and Grave Sites of the Rich and Famous. Insiders' Guide/Globe Pequot Press. ISBN 978-0-7627-4101-4. Archived from the original on April 29, 2016.
- Campbell, Michael (September 26, 2008). Popular Music in America: And The Beat Goes On. Cengage Learning. ISBN 978-0-495-50530-3. Archived from the original on April 29, 2016.
- Clarke, Norm (January 8, 2004). Vegas Confidential: Norm Clarke! Sin City's Ace Insider 1,000 Naked Truths. Stephens Press, LLC. ISBN 978-1-932173-26-0. Archived from the original on April 29, 2016.
- Cole, David John; Browning, Eve; Schroeder, Fred E. H. (2003). Encyclopedia of Modern Everyday Inventions. Greenwood Publishing Group. ISBN 978-0-313-31345-5. Archived from the original on April 29, 2016.
- Consiglio, Tony; Douskey, Franz (October 20, 2011). Sinatra and Me: The Very Good Years. Tantor eBooks. ISBN 978-1-61803-025-2. Archived from the original on April 29, 2016.
- Denver, John (March 1, 2002). John Denver – The Complete Lyrics. Cherry Lane Music. ISBN 978-1-4768-6411-2. Archived from the original on April 29, 2016.
- Donnelley, Paul (2003). Fade to Black: A Book of Movie Obituaries. Omnibus. ISBN 978-0-7119-9512-3. Archived from the original on April 29, 2016.
- Dunning, John (1998). On the Air: The Encyclopedia of Old-Time Radio. Oxford University Press. p. 738-740. ISBN 978-0-19-984045-8.
- Early, Gerald Lyn (2004). One Nation Under a Groove: Motown and American Culture. University of Michigan Press. ISBN 0-472-08956-0. Archived from the original on April 29, 2016.
- Epstein, Dwayne (January 1, 2013). Lee Marvin: Point Blank. Schaffner Press, Inc. ISBN 978-1-936182-40-4. Archived from the original on April 29, 2016.
- Evanier, David (June 30, 2011). All the Things You Are: The Life of Tony Bennett. John Wiley & Sons. p. 99. ISBN 978-1-118-03354-8.
- Farris, Scott (November 5, 2013). Kennedy and Reagan: Why Their Legacies Endure. Lyons Press. p. 196. ISBN 978-1-4930-0188-0.
- Fleischer, Leonore (1976). John Denver. Flash. ISBN 978-0-8256-3909-8. Archived from the original on April 29, 2016.
- Friedwald, Will (1995). Sinatra! the Song is You: A Singer's Art. Simon and Schuster. p. 483. ISBN 978-0-684-19368-7.
- Fuchs, Jeanne; Prigozy, Ruth (2007). Frank Sinatra: The Man, the Music, the Legend. University Rochester Press. ISBN 978-1-58046-251-8. Archived from the original on April 29, 2016.
- Gavin, James (June 23, 2009). Stormy Weather: The Life of Lena Horne. Simon and Schuster. ISBN 978-1-4391-6425-9.
- Geraghty, Lincoln (2011). Directory of World Cinema: American Hollywood. Intellect Books. ISBN 978-1-84150-415-5. Archived from the original on April 29, 2016.
- Gigliotti, Gilbert L. (2002). A Storied Singer: Frank Sinatra as Literary Conceit. Greenwood Press. ISBN 978-0-313-30973-1. Archived from the original on April 29, 2016.
- Gillett, Charlie (January 1978). Rock almanac: top twenty American and British singles and albums of the '50s, '60s, and '70s. Anchor Press. ISBN 978-0-385-11204-8. Archived from the original on April 29, 2016.
- Goldstein, Norm (November 1, 1982). Frank Sinatra, ol' blue eyes. Holt, Rinehart, and Winston. ISBN 978-0-03-061921-2.
- Granata, Charles L. (2003). Sessions with Sinatra: Frank Sinatra and the Art of Recording. Chicago Review Press. ISBN 978-1-61374-281-5. Archived from the original on April 29, 2016.
- Green, Stanley (1999). Hollywood Musicals Year by Year. Hal Leonard Corporation. ISBN 978-0-634-00765-1. Archived from the original on April 29, 2016.
- Hanna, David (January 1, 1998). Sinatra: Ol' Blue Eyes Remember. Random House Value Publishing. ISBN 978-0-517-20317-0. Archived from the original on April 29, 2016.
- Hazard, Sharon (2007). Long Branch. Arcadia Publishing. ISBN 978-0-7385-4967-5. Archived from the original on April 29, 2016.
- Hernandez, David (2010). Broken Face in the Mirror. Red Lead Press. ISBN 978-1-4349-4723-9. Archived from the original on October 30, 2021.
- Heymann, C. David (July 1, 2014). Joe and Marilyn: Legends in Love. Simon and Schuster. ISBN 978-1-4391-9179-8. Archived from the original on April 24, 2016.
- Hodge, Jessica (February 24, 1992). Frank Sinatra. Random House Value Publishing. ISBN 978-0-517-06709-3.
- Hopkins, Jerry (January 11, 2011). Elvis: The Biography. Plexus. ISBN 978-0-85965-454-8. Archived from the original on April 29, 2016.
- Howlett, John (1980). Frank Sinatra. Simon & Schuster. ISBN 978-0-671-79094-3.
- Ingham, Chris (2005). Frank Sinatra. Rough Guides. ISBN 978-1-84353-414-3. Archived from the original on April 29, 2016.
- Jackson, Andrew Grant (February 3, 2015). 1965: The Most Revolutionary Year in Music. Macmillan. ISBN 978-1-4668-6497-9. Archived from the original on August 15, 2021.
- Jones, Delilah (1995). Viva Las Vegas: Nightclub Greats. Friedman/Fairfax Publishers. ISBN 978-1-56799-233-5. Archived from the original on April 29, 2016.
- Kaplan, James (2010). Frank: The making of a legend. Hachette UK. ISBN 978-0-7481-2250-9. Archived from the original on August 1, 2020.
- Kaplan, James (2011). Frank: The Voice. Anchor. ISBN 978-0-7679-2423-8. Archived from the original on April 29, 2016.
- Kelley, Kitty (1986). His Way: The Unauthorized Biography of Frank Sinatra. Bantam Books Trade Paperbacks. ISBN 978-0-553-38618-9. Archived from the original on April 29, 2016.
- Kennedy, Matthew (2004). Edmund Goulding's Dark Victory: Hollywood's Genius Bad Boy. Terrace Books. ISBN 978-0-299-19770-4. Archived from the original on April 27, 2016.
- Kidder, David S.; Oppenheim, Noah D. (October 14, 2008). The Intellectual Devotional Modern Culture: Revive Your Mind, Complete Your Education, and Converse Confidently with the Culturati. Rodale. ISBN 978-1-60529-793-4. Archived from the original on August 1, 2020.
- Kline, Pete (1990). "The Capitol Years". The Capitol Years (booklet). New York: Capitol Records. CDP 7 94317 2.
- Knight, Timothy (October 12, 2010). Sinatra: Hollywood His Way. Running Press Book Publishers. p. 79. ISBN 978-0-7624-4174-7.
- Kuntz, Tom; Kuntz, Phil (2000). The Sinatra Files: The Secret FBI Dossier. Three Rivers Press. ISBN 978-0-8129-3276-8.
- Kutner, Jon (May 26, 2010). 1000 UK Number One Hits. Omnibus Press. ISBN 978-0-85712-360-2. Archived from the original on April 29, 2016.
- Lahr, John (2000). Show and Tell: New Yorker Profiles. University of California Press. ISBN 978-0-520-23377-5. Archived from the original on April 29, 2016.
- Lamb, David (August 24, 2011). The Africans. Knopf Doubleday Publishing Group. ISBN 978-0-307-79792-6. Archived from the original on April 29, 2016.
- Larkin, Colin (2002). The Virgin Encyclopedia of Fifties Music. Virgin Books. ISBN 978-1-85227-937-0. Archived from the original on April 24, 2016.
- Lees, Gene (1998). Singers and the Song II. Oxford University Press. ISBN 978-0-19-511556-7.
- Levinson, Peter J. (2001). September in the Rain: The Life of Nelson Riddle. Billboard Books. ISBN 978-0-8230-7672-7.
- Levinson, Peter J. (2009). Tommy Dorsey: Livin' in a Great Big Way, a Biography. Da Capo Press, Incorporated. ISBN 978-0-7867-3494-8. Archived from the original on April 29, 2016.
- Land, Barbara; Land, Myrick (2004). A Short History of Las Vegas. University of Nevada Press. ISBN 978-0-87417-564-6. Archived from the original on April 29, 2016.
- Lehmann, Bob; Blanck, Bob (April 30, 2008). San Gorgonio Search and Rescue Team. Arcadia Publishing. ISBN 978-0-7385-5576-8. Archived from the original on April 29, 2016.
- Lip, Tony; Prigge, Steven (October 3, 2006). Shut Up and Eat!: Mangia with Family Recipes and Stories from Your Favorite Italian-American Stars. Penguin Group USA. ISBN 978-0-425-21177-9. Archived from the original on April 29, 2016.
- Lonstein, Albert I.; Marino, Vito R. (1970). The Compleat Sinatra: Disgography [sic] Filmography, Television Appearances, Motion Picture Appearances, Radio Appearances, Concert Appearances, Stage Appearances. Cameron Publications. Archived from the original on April 29, 2016.
- Marill, Alvin H. (1990). The complete films of Edward G. Robinson. Carol Publishing Group. ISBN 978-0-8065-1181-8. Archived from the original on April 29, 2016.
- McGuiggan, Amy Whorf (2009). Take Me Out to the Ball Game: The Story of the Sensational Baseball Song. U of Nebraska Press. p. 86. ISBN 978-0-8032-1891-8.
- McNally, Karen (June 12, 2015). When Frankie Went to Hollywood: Frank Sinatra and American Male Identity. University of Illinois Press. ISBN 978-0-252-09820-8. Archived from the original on April 29, 2016.
- Mirtle, Jack (January 1, 1998). The Music of Billy May: A Discography. Greenwood Press. ISBN 978-0-313-30739-3. Archived from the original on April 29, 2016.
- Moehring, Eugene P. (2007). The University of Nevada, Las Vegas: A History. University of Nevada Press.
- Morrell, David (January 24, 2013). Frank Sinatra: The Artist and His Music. David Morrell. ISBN 978-1-937760-24-3. Archived from the original on April 29, 2016.
- Moser, Margaret (April 1, 2011). Movie Stars Do the Dumbest Things. St. Martin's Press. ISBN 978-1-4299-7837-8. Archived from the original on April 29, 2016.
- Nachman, Gerald (2000). Raised on Radio. University of California Press. ISBN 978-0-520-22303-5. Archived from the original on April 26, 2016.
- Newton, Michael (October 31, 2003). The FBI Encyclopedia. McFarland. ISBN 978-0-7864-6620-7. Archived from the original on April 29, 2016.
- Nimmo, Harry (2004). The Andrews Sisters: A Biography and Career Record. McFarland. ISBN 978-0-7864-1731-5. Archived from the original on April 26, 2016.
- O'Brien, Daniel (1998). The Frank Sinatra Film Guide. Batsford. ISBN 978-0-7134-8418-2. Archived from the original on April 29, 2016.
- O'Brien, Daniel (October 30, 2014). The Frank Sinatra Film Guide. Pavilion Books. ISBN 978-1-84994-250-8. Archived from the original on April 29, 2016.
- Osborne, Richard (July 28, 2014). Vinyl: A History of the Analogue Record. Ashgate Publishing, Ltd. ISBN 978-1-4724-3433-3. Archived from the original on April 29, 2016.
- Peters, Richard; O'Brien, Ed; Sayers, Scott P. (1982). The Frank Sinatra Scrapbook: His Life and Times in Words and Pictures. Pop Universal. ISBN 978-0-285-62539-6. Archived from the original on April 25, 2016.
- Petkov, Steven; Mustazza, Leonard (1995). The Frank Sinatra Reader. Oxford University Press. ISBN 978-0-19-509531-9.
- Quirk, Lawrence J.; Schoell, William (1999). The Rat Pack: Neon Nights with the Kings of Cool. Harper Collins. ISBN 978-0-380-73222-7. Archived from the original on August 1, 2020.
- Rees, Dafydd; Crampton, Luke (1999). Rock Stars Encyclopedia. DK Pub. ISBN 978-0-7894-4613-8.
- Ridgeway, John (1977). The Sinatra File. John Ridgeway Books.
- Roberts, Jerry (June 5, 2009). Encyclopedia of Television Film Directors. Scarecrow Press. ISBN 978-0-8108-6378-1. Archived from the original on April 29, 2016.
- Roby, Steven (August 31, 2010). Becoming Jimi Hendrix: From Southern Crossroads to Psychedelic London, the Untold Story of a Musical Genius. Da Capo Press. p. 111. ISBN 978-0-306-81945-2.
- Rojek, Chris (2004). Frank Sinatra. Polity. ISBN 978-0-7456-3090-8. Archived from the original on April 29, 2016.
- Roman, James (October 1, 2011). Chronicles of Old Las Vegas: Exposing Sin City's High-Stakes History. Museyon. ISBN 978-1-938450-02-0. Archived from the original on April 29, 2016.
- Rotella, Mark (2010). Amore: The Story of Italian American Song. Macmillan. ISBN 978-1-4299-7847-7. Archived from the original on August 17, 2021.
- Sackett, Susan (1995). Hollywood Sings!: An Inside Look at Sixty Years of Academy Award-nominated Songs. Billboard Books. ISBN 978-0-8230-7623-9. Archived from the original on April 29, 2016.
- Sann, Paul (1967). Fads, Follies, and Delusions of the American People /by Paul Sann. Crown Publishers. Archived from the original on April 29, 2016.
- Santopietro, Tom (November 11, 2008). Sinatra in Hollywood. St. Martin's Press. ISBN 978-0-312-36226-3.
- Sehlinger, Bob; Ridge, Menasha; Castleman, Deke (August 8, 2011). The Unofficial Guide to Las Vegas 2012. John Wiley & Sons. ISBN 978-1-118-14345-2. Archived from the original on April 29, 2016.
- Sforza, John (February 5, 2015). Swing It!: The Andrews Sisters Story. University Press of Kentucky. ISBN 978-0-8131-4897-7. Archived from the original on April 28, 2016.
- Shaw, Arnold (June 1968). Sinatra: retreat of the romantic. W. H. Allen. ISBN 978-0-491-00161-8. Archived from the original on April 29, 2016.
- Shaw, Arnold (1982). Sinatra, the entertainer. Delilah. ISBN 978-0-933328-43-3. Archived from the original on April 29, 2016.
- Sheridan, John Harris (September 6, 2011). Howard Hughes: The Las Vegas Years: The Women, the Mormons, the Mafia. AuthorHouse. ISBN 978-1-4634-0693-6. Archived from the original on April 29, 2016.
- Sifakis, Carl (January 1, 2005). The Mafia Encyclopedia. Infobase Publishing. ISBN 978-0-8160-6989-7. Archived from the original on January 25, 2016.
- Silva, Luiz Carlos do Nascimento (January 1, 2000). Put Your Dreams Away: A Frank Sinatra Discography. Greenwood Publishing Group. ISBN 978-0-313-31055-3. Archived from the original on April 29, 2016.
- Sinatra, Barbara (2011). Lady Blue Eyes: My Life with Frank Sinatra. Random House. ISBN 978-1-4464-7288-0. Archived from the original on April 29, 2016.
- Sinatra, Nancy (1995). Frank Sinatra: An American Legend. General Publishing Group. ISBN 978-1-881649-68-7.
- Sinatra, Nancy (1986). Frank Sinatra, My Father. Simon and Schuster. p. 24. ISBN 978-0-671-62508-5.
- Sinatra, Tina; Coplon, Jeff (2000). My Father's Daughter: A Memoir. New York: Simon & Schuster. ISBN 0-684-87076-2.
- Sirvaitis, Karen (August 1, 2010). The European American Experience. Twenty-First Century Books. p. 23. ISBN 978-0-7613-4088-1.
- Small, Pauline (2009). Sophia Loren: Moulding the Star. Intellect Books. ISBN 978-1-84150-234-2. Archived from the original on April 29, 2016.
- Smith, Chris (2009). One Hundred and One Albums that Changed Popular Music. Oxford University Press. ISBN 978-0-19-537371-4. Archived from the original on April 29, 2016.
- Smith, Martin (2005). Frank Sinatra: When Ol' Blue Eyes was a Red. Redwords. ISBN 978-1-905192-02-1. Archived from the original on April 29, 2016.
- Sonneborn, Liz (January 1, 2002). A to Z of American Women in the Performing Arts. Infobase Publishing. ISBN 978-1-4381-0790-5. Archived from the original on April 29, 2016.
- Summers, Anthony; Swan, Robbyn (2010). Sinatra: The Life. Transworld. ISBN 978-1-4070-6890-9. Archived from the original on April 29, 2016.
- Terrace, Vincent (November 1, 1998). Radio Programs, 1924–1984: A Catalog of More Than 1800 Shows. McFarland. ISBN 978-0-7864-4513-4. Archived from the original on April 29, 2016.
- Terrace, Vincent (June 19, 2013). Television Specials: 5,336 Entertainment Programs, 1936–2012, 2d ed. McFarland. ISBN 978-1-4766-1240-9. Archived from the original on April 29, 2016.
- Thomas, Evan (February 5, 2013). Robert Kennedy: His Life. Simon and Schuster. ISBN 978-1-4767-3456-9. Archived from the original on April 29, 2016.
- Travis, Dempsey J. (December 1, 2001). The FBI Files: On the Tainted and the Damned. Urban Research Pr. ISBN 978-0-941484-32-9. Archived from the original on April 29, 2016.
- Turner, John Frayn (January 1, 2004). Frank Sinatra. Taylor Trade Publications. p. 93. ISBN 978-1-58979-145-9.
- Tyler, Don (January 1, 2007). Hit Songs, 1900–1955: American Popular Music of the Pre-rock Era. McFarland. ISBN 978-0-7864-2946-2. Archived from the original on April 29, 2016.
- Waldman, Carl; Donovan, Jim (February 1, 1999). Forever Sinatra: A Celebration in Words & Images. Legends Press. ISBN 978-0-9668136-0-9. Archived from the original on April 29, 2016.
- Wayne, Jane Ellen (2004). Ava Gardner: Her Life and Loves. Robson. ISBN 978-1-86105-785-3. Archived from the original on April 29, 2016.
- Wayne, Jane (April 16, 2006). The Leading Men of MGM. Da Capo Press. ISBN 978-0-7867-1768-2. Archived from the original on April 29, 2016.
- Weatherford, Mike (January 1, 2001). Cult Vegas: The Weirdest! the Wildest! the Swingin'est Town on Earth!. Huntington Press Inc. ISBN 978-0-929712-71-0. Archived from the original on April 29, 2016.
- Whitburn, Joel (1986). Pop Memories 1890–1954. Menomonee Falls, Wisconsin: Record Research, Inc. ISBN 0-89820-083-0.
- Whitburn, Joel (2001). Joel Whitburn's top pop albums, 1955–2001. Record Research. ISBN 978-0-89820-147-5.
- Wilson, Colin; Wilson, Damon (May 31, 2011). Scandal!: An Explosive Exposé of the Affairs, Corruption and Power Struggles of the Rich and Famous. Ebury Publishing. ISBN 978-0-7535-4732-8. Archived from the original on April 29, 2016.
- Wood, Ean (September 1, 1996). Born to Swing. Sanctuary. ISBN 978-1-86074-154-8.
- Young, William H.; Young, Nancy K. (2007). The Great Depression in America: A Cultural Encyclopedia, Volume 2. Greenwood Publishing Group. ISBN 978-0-313-33522-8. Archived from the original on October 22, 2016.
- Young, William H.; Young, Nancy K. (2010). World War II and the Postwar Years in America: A Historical and Cultural Encyclopedia. ABC-CLIO. ISBN 978-0-313-35652-0. Archived from the original on April 27, 2016.
