= The Best of the Columbia Years: 1943–1952 =

The Best of the Columbia Years: 1943-1952

Box set by Frank Sinatra
- Released: October 31, 1995
- Recorded: 1943–1952
- Genre: Traditional pop
- Length: 297:29
- Label: Legacy

Frank Sinatra chronology
The Very Best of Frank Sinatra (1997)	The Best of the Columbia Years: 1943-1952 (1995)	Frank Sinatra & the Tommy Dorsey Orchestra (1998)

Professional ratings
Review scores
Source	Rating
AllMusic	5/5 stars
Q	4/5 stars

The Best of the Columbia Years: 1943–1952 is a four-disc box set by the American singer Frank Sinatra, released on Legacy Records in 1995, catalogue C4K-64681. Initial release was in a book-style edition; a later edition was reissued in 1998 with a standard jewel case package and given a different catalogue number, C4K-65620. All but twelve tracks were originally released on 78 rpm records, and as an overview of Sinatra's recordings on Columbia this set replaces the previous catalogue item The Voice: The Columbia Years (1943-1952), released in 1986 on vinyl and later also on compact disc. The box set contains highlights of his career with Columbia Records; the complete recordings from these years were released in 1993 on The Columbia Years 1943-1952: The Complete Recordings.

== Content ==
These recordings comprise the first phase of Sinatra's solo career, after his apprenticeship in the swing bands of Harry James and Tommy Dorsey, Sinatra having signed with Columbia on June 1, 1943. At that time, the Petrillo recording ban was on, and the first two tracks of the box reflect this situation, a cappella recordings of Frank with a backing vocal group. A second recording ban took place in 1948, and Sinatra again recorded with vocals only on the track "Nature Boy." The rest of the recordings featured instrumental backing with few exceptions arranged by Axel Stordahl, Sinatra's mainstay during the Columbia period. The bulk of the selections on this package date from the 1940s, with only the disc four covering the declining years of his career while on the label in the 1950s.

Beginning with disc four track five, Columbia simultaneously released these records as 45 rpm singles, the new format having been introduced by its rival RCA Records in 1949. Disc one tracks 19 through 21, and disc two tracks four through six, were issued as part of Sinatra's very first album, a package of four records entitled The Voice of Frank Sinatra, which peaked at #1 on the fledgling album chart. Disc four tracks six through nine were also included on the Columbia ten-inch album Sing and Dance with Frank Sinatra, catalogue CL-6143.

Disc two track 22, "Sweet Lorraine," features Sinatra with the 1946 Metronome All-Stars: Charlie Shavers, Lawrence Brown, Johnny Hodges, Coleman Hawkins, Harry Carney, Nat King Cole, Bob Ahern, Eddie Safranski, and Buddy Rich. Disc three- track 2, "My Romance," is a duet with Dinah Shore, and disc three -track 23, "Let's Take An Old-Fashioned Walk," is a duet with Doris Day.

== Select personnel ==
- Frank Sinatra — vocals
- Axel Stordahl, George Siravo, Jeff Alexander — arrangements
- Felix Slatkin — violin
- Eleanor Slatkin — cello
- Mitch Miller — oboe
- Johnny Guarnieri, Bill Miller — piano
- Dave Barbour, Barney Kessel, Allan Reuss, George Van Eps — guitars
- Bob Haggart — bass
- Nick Fatool, Alvin Stoller — drums

== Track listing ==
Columbia 78 catalogue numbers and chart positions taken from Sinatra Family website singles discography

=== Disc one ===
No.	Title	Writer(s)	Length
1.	"Close to You" (Columbia 36678 Billboard #10)	Al Hoffman, Carl G. Lampl, Jerry Livingston	3:18
2.	"People Will Say We're in Love" (Columbia 36682 Billboard #3)	Oscar Hammerstein II, Richard Rodgers	3:20
3.	"If You Are But a Dream" (Columbia 36756 Billboard #19)	Moe Jaffe, Jack Fulton, Nat Bonx	3:04
4.	"Saturday Night (Is the Loneliest Night of the Week)" (Columbia 36762 Billboard #2)	Jule Styne, Sammy Cahn	2:43
5.	"White Christmas" (Columbia 36756 Billboard #7)	Irving Berlin	3:22
6.	"I Fall in Love Too Easily" (Columbia 36380)	Jule Styne, Sammy Cahn	2:36
7.	"Ol' Man River" (Columbia 55037)	Oscar Hammerstein II, Jerome Kern	4:00
8.	"Stormy Weather" (Columbia 55037)	Ted Koehler, Harold Arlen	4:13
9.	"Embraceable You" (Songs by Sinatra Columbia C 124)	Ira Gershwin, George Gershwin	3:16
10.	"She's Funny That Way" (Songs by Sinatra Columbia C 124)	Richard Whiting, Neil Moret	3:20
11.	"My Melancholy Baby" (Columbia 38287)	Ernie Burnett, Maybelle Watson, George A. Norton	3:08
12.	"Where or When" (Dedicated to You Columbia C 124)	Lorenz Hart, Richard Rodgers	3:13
13.	"All the Things You Are" (Songs by Sinatra Columbia C 124)	Oscar Hammerstein II, Jerome Kern	3:00
14.	"I Should Care" (Columbia 36791 Billboard #8)	Sammy Cahn, Paul Weston, Axel Stordahl	3:00
15.	"Dream" (Columbia 36797 Billboard #5)	Johnny Mercer	3:02
16.	"Put Your Dreams Away (For Another Day)" (Columbia 36814)	Ruth Lowe, Paul Mann, Stephen Weiss	3:06
17.	"Over the Rainbow" (Songs by Sinatra Columbia C 124)	Yip Harburg, Harold Arlen	3:16
18.	"If I Loved You" (Columbia 36825 Billboard #7)	Oscar Hammerstein II, Richard Rodgers	3:04
19.	"Someone to Watch Over Me" (The Voice of Frank Sinatra Columbia C 112 Billboard #1)	Ira Gershwin, George Gershwin	3:19
20.	"You Go to My Head" (The Voice of Frank Sinatra Columbia C 112 Billboard #1)	J. Fred Coots, Haven Gillespie	2:59
21.	"These Foolish Things (Remind Me of You)" (The Voice of Frank Sinatra Columbia C 112 Billboard #1)	Holt Marvell, Jack Strachey	3:07
22.	"The House I Live In" (Columbia 36886 Billboard #22)	Lewis Allan, Earl Robinson	3:18
23.	"Day By Day" (Columbia 36905 Billboard #5)	Sammy Cahn, Paul Weston, Axel Stordahl	3:08

=== Disc two ===
No.	Title	Writer(s)	Length
1.	"Nancy (With the Laughing Face)" (Columbia 36868 Billboard #10)	Phil Silvers, Jimmy Van Heusen	3:19
2.	"Full Moon and Empty Arms" (Columbia 36947 Billboard #17)	Buddy Kaye, Ted Mossman, Sergei Rachmaninoff	3:12
3.	"Oh, What It Seemed to Be" (Columbia 36905 Billboard #1)	Bennie Benjamin, George Weiss, Frankie Carle	2:59
4.	"I Don't Stand a Ghost of a Chance with You" (The Voice of Frank Sinatra Columbia C 112 Billboard #1)	Bing Crosby, Ned Washington, Victor Young	3:11
5.	"Why Shouldn't I?" (The Voice of Frank Sinatra Columbia C 112 Billboard #1)	Cole Porter	2:52
6.	"Try a Little Tenderness" (The Voice of Frank Sinatra Columbia C 112 Billboard #1)	James Campbell, Reginald Connelly, Harry M. Woods	3:08
7.	"Begin the Beguine" (Columbia 37064 Billboard #23)	Cole Porter	2:55
8.	"They Say It's Wonderful" (Columbia 36975 Billboard #2)	Irving Berlin	3:04
9.	"That Old Black Magic" (Songs by Sinatra Columbia C 179)	Johnny Mercer, Harold Arlen	2:32
10.	"How Deep Is the Ocean?" (Columbia DC 385 ‡)	Irving Berlin	2:56
11.	"Home on the Range" (The Complete Recordings Columbia CXK 48673)	Brewster M. Higley, Daniel E. Kelley	3:11
12.	"Five Minutes More" (Columbia 37048 Billboard #1)	Jule Styne, Sammy Cahn	2:35
13.	"The Things We Did Last Summer" (Columbia 37089 Billboard #8)	Jule Styne, Sammy Cahn	3:15
14.	"Among My Souvenirs" (The Complete Recordings Columbia CXK 48673)	Edgar Leslie, Horatio Nicholls	3:15
15.	"September Song" (Columbia 37161 Billboard #8)	Maxwell Anderson, Kurt Weill	3:05
16.	"Blue Skies" (Frank Sinatra Sings Irving Berlin Columbia B 1524)	Irving Berlin	2:28
17.	"Guess I'll Hang My Tears Out to Dry" (Frankly Sentimental Columbia C 185)	Jule Styne, Sammy Cahn	3:23
18.	"Lost in the Stars" (Columbia 38650)	Maxwell Anderson, Kurt Weill	3:15
19.	"There's No Business Like Show Business" (Columbia DB 2321 ‡)	Irving Berlin	3:18
20.	"Time After Time" (Columbia 37300 Billboard #16)	Jule Styne, Sammy Cahn	3:09
21.	"The Brooklyn Bridge" (Columbia 37288)	Jule Styne, Sammy Cahn	2:35
22.	"Sweet Lorraine" (Columbia 37293)	Mitchell Parish, Cliff Burwell	3:08
23.	"Always" (The Complete Recordings Columbia CXK 48673)	Irving Berlin	2:55
24.	"Mam'selle" (Columbia 37343 Billboard #1)	Mack Gordon, Edmund Goulding	3:19

=== Disc three ===
No.	Title	Writer(s)	Length
1.	"Stella by Starlight" (Columbia 37343 Billboard #21)	Ned Washington, Victor Young	3:19
2.	"My Romance" (Columbia 37528)	Lorenz Hart, Richard Rodgers	3:15
3.	"If I Had You" (Romantic Songs from the Early Years Columbia HL 7405)	Ted Shapiro, Jimmy Campbell, Reginald Connelly	3:06
4.	"One for My Baby (And One More for the Road)" (Frankly Sentimental Columbia C 185)	Johnny Mercer, Harold Arlen	3:04
5.	"But Beautiful" (Columbia 38053 Billboard #14)	Johnny Burke, Jimmy Van Heusen	3:12
6.	"You're My Girl" (Columbia 37978 Billboard #23)	Jule Styne, Sammy Cahn	3:09
7.	"All of Me" (Columbia 38163 Billboard #21)	Gerald Marks, Seymour Simons	2:44
8.	"Night and Day" (The Complete Recordings Columbia CXK 48673)	Cole Porter	3:38
9.	"S'Posin" (Columbia 38210)	Andy Razaf, Paul Denniker	2:45
10.	"The Night We Called It a Day" (The Complete Recordings Columbia CXK 48673)	Tom Adair, Matt Dennis	3:21
11.	"The Song Is You" (Frank Sinatra Sings Jerome Kern Columbia B 1702)	Oscar Hammerstein II, Jerome Kern	3:15
12.	"What'll I Do?" (Columbia 38045 Billboard #23)	Irving Berlin	3:05
13.	"The Music Stopped" (Dedicated to You Columbia C 124)	Jimmy McHugh, Harold Adamson	2:57
14.	"Fools Rush In (Where Angels Fear to Tread)" (The Complete Recordings Columbia CXK 48673)	Johnny Mercer, Rube Bloom	2:59
15.	"I've Got a Crush on You" (Columbia 38151 Billboard #21)	Ira Gershwin, George Gershwin	3:15
16.	"Body and Soul" (Frankly Sentimental Columbia C 185)	Johnny Green, Edward Heyman, Robert Sour, Frank Eyton	3:18
17.	"I'm Glad There Is You" (The Frank Sinatra Story Columbia C2L 6)	Paul Madeira, Jimmy Dorsey	3:06
18.	"Autumn in New York" (Columbia 38316 Billboard #27)	Vernon Duke	3:15
19.	"Nature Boy" (Columbia 38210 Billboard #7)	Eden Ahbez	3:18
20.	"Once In Love with Amy" (Columbia 38391)	Frank Loesser	2:59
21.	"Some Enchanted Evening" (Columbia 38446 Billboard #6)	Oscar Hammerstein II, Richard Rodgers	3:07
22.	"The Hucklebuck" (Columbia 38486 Billboard #10)	Charlie Parker, Roy Alfred, Andy Gibson	3:00
23.	"Let's Take an Old-Fashioned Walk" (Columbia 38513 Billboard #17)	Irving Berlin	2:59
24.	"It All Depends on You" (Columbia 38550)	Buddy DeSylva, Lew Brown, Ray Henderson	2:43

=== Disc four ===
No.	Title	Writer(s)	Length
1.	"Bye Bye Baby" (Columbia 38556)	Jule Styne, Leo Robin	2:38
2.	"Don't Cry, Joe (Let Her Go, Let Her Go, Let Her Go)" (Columbia 38555 Billboard #9)	Joe Marsala	3:18
3.	"That Lucky Old Sun" (Columbia 38608 Billboard #16)	Haven Gillespie, Beasley Smith	3:16
4.	"Chattanoogie Shoe Shine Boy" (Columbia 1-496 Billboard #10)	Harry Stone, Jack Stapp	2:37
5.	"American Beauty Rose" (Columbia 38809 Billboard #26)	Hal David, Arthur Altman, Redd Evans	2:34
6.	"Should I?" (Sing and Dance with Frank Sinatra Columbia C 218)	Arthur Freed, Nacio Herb Brown	2:24
7.	"You Do Something to Me" (Sing and Dance with Frank Sinatra Columbia C 218)	Cole Porter	2:33
8.	"Lover" (Sing and Dance with Frank Sinatra Columbia C 218)	Lorenz Hart, Richard Rodgers	2:39
9.	"When You're Smiling" (Sing and Dance with Frank Sinatra Columbia C 218)	Mark Fisher, Joe Goodwin, Larry Shay	2:28
10.	"London By Night" (Columbia 39592)	Carroll Coates	3:09
11.	"Meet Me at the Copa" (The Complete Recordings Columbia CXK 48673)	Sammy Cahn, Axel Stordahl	3:11
12.	"April in Paris" (Columbia 39592)	Yip Harburg, Vernon Duke	2:43
13.	"I Guess I'll Have to Dream the Rest" (Columbia 39044)	Oscar Hammerstein II, Jerome Kern	2:42
14.	"Nevertheless (I'm in Love with You)" (Columbia 39044 Billboard #14)	Bert Kalmar, Harry Ruby	3:08
15.	"I Am Loved" (Columbia 39079)	Cole Porter	2:25
16.	"Hello, Young Lovers" (Columbia 39294)	Oscar Hammerstein II, Richard Rodgers	3:32
17.	"We Kiss in a Shadow" ('Columbia 39294 Billboard #22)	Oscar Hammerstein II, Richard Rodgers	3:35
18.	"I'm a Fool to Want You" (Columbia 39425 Billboard #14)	Joel Herron, Frank Sinatra, Jack Wolf	2:55
19.	"Love Me" (Columbia 39346)	Ned Washington, Victor Young	3:09
20.	"Deep Night" (Columbia 39527)	Rudy Vallee, Charlie Henderson	3:16
21.	"I Could Write a Book" (Columbia 39652)	Lorenz Hart, Richard Rodgers	2:42
22.	"I Hear a Rhapsody" (Columbia 39652 Billboard #24)	George Fragos, Jack Baker, Dick Gasparre, Richard Bard	3:04
23.	"My Girl" (Columbia 39726)	Charles Freed	2:24
24.	"The Birth of the Blues" (Columbia 39882 Billboard #19)	Buddy DeSylva, Lew Brown, Ray Henderson	3:28
25.	"Azure-Te (Paris Blues)" (Columbia 39819 Billboard #30)	William Davis, Donald Wolf	2:33
26.	"Why Try to Change Me Now" (Columbia 39882)	Cy Coleman, Joseph A. McCarthy	2:47

‡denotes United Kingdom release
