= Portrait of Sinatra: Columbia Classics =

Compilation album by Frank Sinatra
- Released: June 25, 1997
- Recorded: August 31, 1939 – March 27, 1951
- Genre: Traditional pop
- Label: Sony Records

Frank Sinatra chronology
The Very Best of Frank Sinatra (1997)	Portrait of Sinatra: Columbia Classics (1997)	The Best of the Columbia Years: 1943-1952 (1998)

Portrait of Sinatra: Columbia Classics is a compilation album by Frank Sinatra, released in 1997. This compilation was later re-released in 2010 as The Essential Frank Sinatra: The Columbia Years.

While some prefer the Sinatra of the Capitol era, citing that work as more elegant and artful, the recordings Frank made for Columbia in the 1940s and early 1950s are just as important. They represent a different phase in Sinatra's evolution, but are no less striking in their emotional impact. While Axel Stordahl, Sinatra's chief arranger at Columbia, may not have been the modernist/minimalist that Nelson Riddle would become in the latter's Capitol work, Stordahl was as sympathetic a collaborator as Sinatra had encountered to that point.

== Track listing ==
=== Disc one ===
1. "All or Nothing at All"
2. "If You Are But a Dream"
3. "Night and Day"
4. "Sweet Lorraine"
5. "Guess I'll Hang My Tears Out to Dry"
6. "Nancy (With the Laughing Face)"
7. "The House I Live In"
8. "Blue Skies"
9. "There's No You"
10. "When Your Lover Has Gone"
11. "Stormy Weather"
12. "The Nearness of You"
13. "These Foolish Things (Remind Me of You)"
14. "Saturday Night (Is the Loneliest Night of the Week)"
15. "Where or When"
16. "Someone to Watch Over Me"
17. "Put Your Dreams Away (For Another Day)"
18. "All of Me"

=== Disc two ===
1. "There's No Business Like Show Business"
2. "Falling in Love with Love"
3. "You Go to My Head"
4. "Everybody Loves Somebody"
5. "I Believe"
6. "Why Was I Born?"
7. "I've Got a Crush on You"
8. "Body and Soul"
9. "That Old Feeling"
10. "Almost Like Being in Love"
11. "September Song"
12. "It Never Entered My Mind"
13. "I Only Have Eyes for You"
14. "The Song Is You"
15. "Don't Cry, Joe (Let Her Go, Let Her Go, Let Her Go)"
16. "It All Depends on You"
17. "The Continental"
18. "I'm a Fool to Want You"
