= Should I? (song) =

1929 popular song

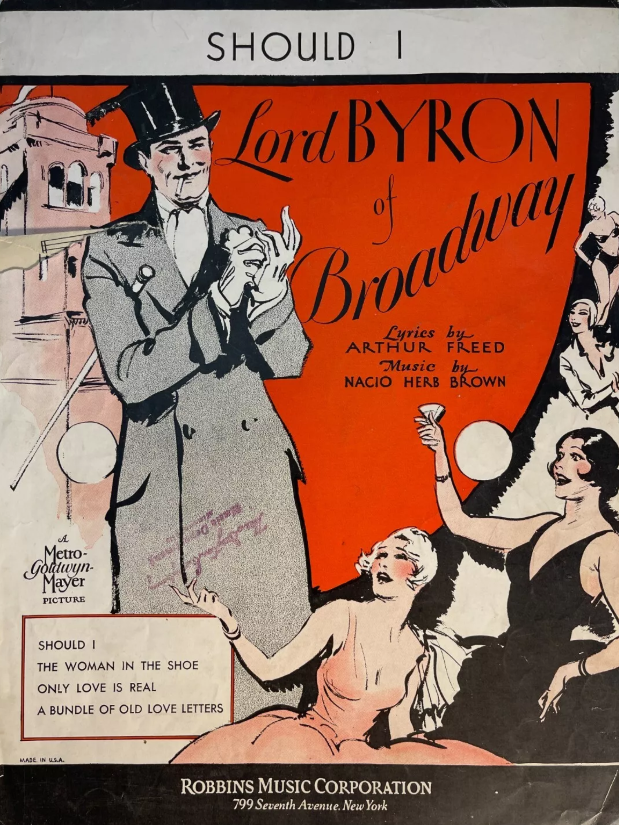
- Sheet music cover, 1929

Song by Arden–Ohman Orchestra
- Published: 1929 by Robbins Music Corp.
- Recorded: July 29, 1929
- Genre: Jazz; American Dance Music
- Length: 3:15
- Label: Victor 53960
- Composer: Nacio Herb Brown
- Lyricist: Arthur Freed

"Should I?" is a song with music by Nacio Herb Brown and lyrics by Arthur Freed, first published in 1929. It was originally written for the Metro-Goldwyn-Mayer film Lord Byron of Broadway (1930), where it was introduced by singer and actor Charles Kaley. The song became a major hit, charting at number 3 on Billboard for 11 weeks in 1930.

== Background ==
The first recording of "Should I?" was on July 29, 1929, by Arden–Ohman Orchestra with Scrappy Lambert providing vocals.

In 1931, the song was recorded in Polish by Henryk Wars' Vocal Group under the title "Ja wiem o twej miłości" (eng. "I Know About Your Love"). The translation was made by Andrzej Włast.

Re-arranged by Conrad Salinger, Wally Heglin and Skip Martin, "Should I?" appeared in the musical film Singin' in the Rain (1952). Under the musical direction of Lennie Hayton, it was briefly sung by character actor Wilson Wood parodying Rudy Vallee during the "Beautiful Girl Montage" segment. A portion of the song had also been featured in the 1943 MGM musical film, Thousands Cheer, sung by Georgia Carroll as part of a medley built around an unrelated song, "I Dug a Ditch" by the Kay Kyser orchestra, for which Carroll was a featured vocalist.

== Notable recordings ==
Date	Main recording artist	Vocalist	Notes	Ref.
July 29, 1929	Arden–Ohman Orchestra	Scrappy Lambert	Lambert credited as "Burt Lorin".	
October 10, 1929	The Harmonians	Tom Frawley		
October 18, 1929	Paul Whiteman and his Orchestra	Jack Fulton		
November 17, 1929	Jesse Stafford and his Orchestra	Jesse Stafford		
December 5, 1929	Frank Munn and his Orchestra	Frank Munn	Credited as "Paul Oliver".	
December 23, 1929	Phil Spitalny and his Orchestra	instrumental	Credited as "Hotel Pennsylvania Music".	
December 24, 1929	Charles Kaley		Featured in Lord Byron of Broadway.	
January 15, 1930	Jack Miller and the New Englanders	Jack Miller		
February 18, 1930	Jimmie Noone's Apex Club Orchestra	Jimmie Noone		
February 20, 1930	The Rondoliers			
February 28, 1930	Seger Ellis		Featuring Tommy Dorsey and Eddie Lang.	
c. 1931	Chór Henryka Warsa		Polish version "Ja wiem o twej miłości".	
October 20, 1947	André Previn	instrumental	Featuring Al Viola and Jackie Mills.	
April 24, 1950	Frank Sinatra		Released on the Sing and Dance with Frank Sinatra album.	
c. 1951	Lennie Hayton	Wilson Wood	Soundtrack recording for Singin' in the Rain and part of the "Beautiful Girl Montage" medley.	
September 19, 1956	Nat King Cole		Recording included on From The Capitol Vaults (Vol. 3) compilation album.	

== Charts ==
Chart (1930)	Peak position
US Billboard	3
