= Arden-Ohman Orchestra =

American orchestra

Arden & Ohman
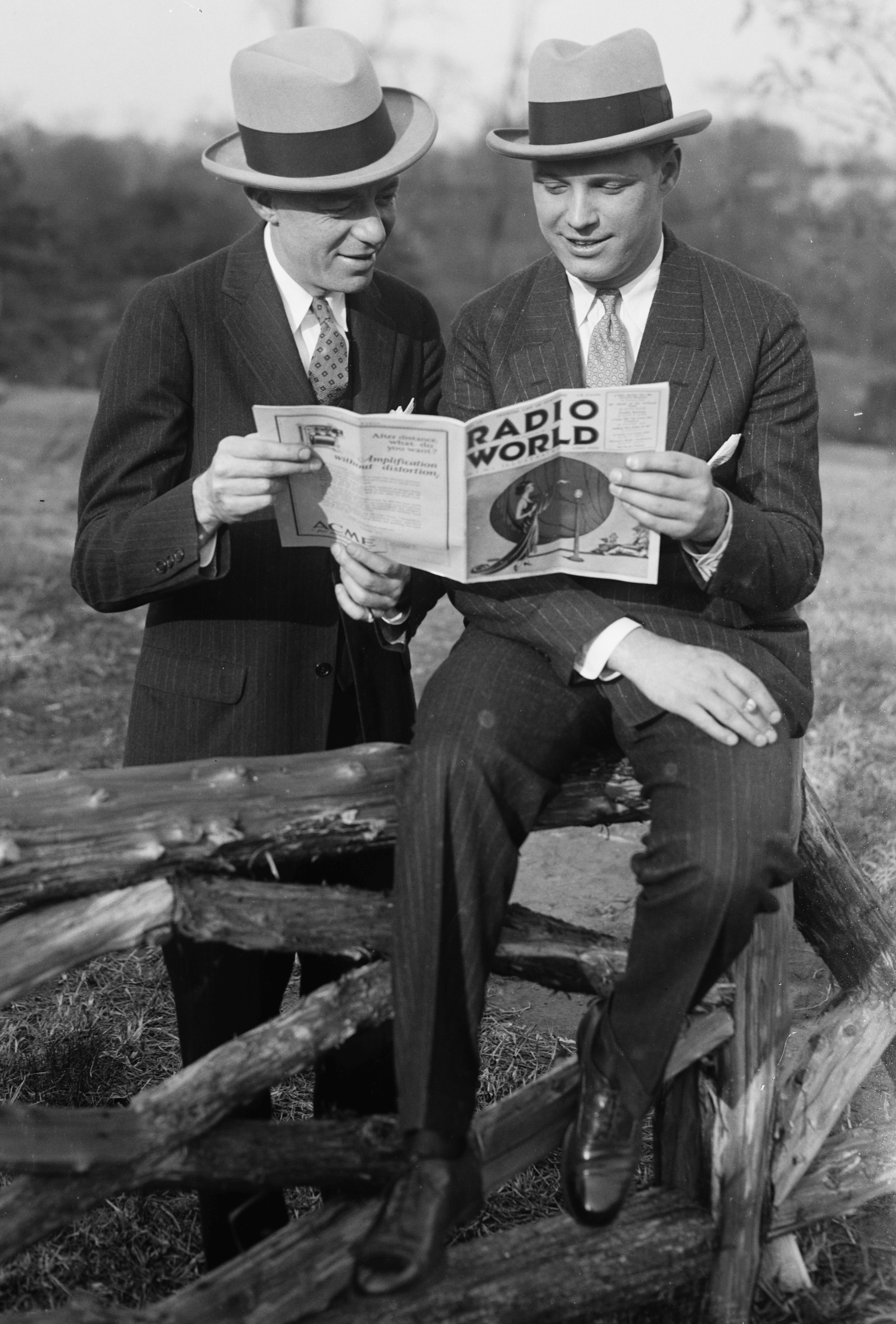
- American pianists Victor Arden (1893-1962) and Phil Ohman (1896-1954)

Background information
- Genre: Jazz
- Years active: 1922 — 1933
- Label: Victor Records Brunswick Records
- Past members: Victor Arden Phil Ohman

The Arden-Ohman Orchestra was an American orchestra headed by bandleaders Victor Arden and Phil Ohman in the 1920s and 1930s. They recorded several hits, including "I Love a Parade", and served as the pit band for Broadway and Gershwin shows such as Lady, Be Good (1924), Tip-Toes (1926) and Spring Is Here (1929). After the orchestra dissolved in 1933, Arden formed another duo with pianist Phil Wall called Arden & Arden.

== Background and history ==
After World War I, musician Victor Arden (March 8, 1893–July 31, 1962) traveled to New York City, where he recorded piano rolls for QRS Music Technologies. He met pianist Phil Ohman (October 7, 1896–August 8, 1954), who started working at QRS in early 1919, and the two ended up forming a duo, which became the Arden-Ohman Orchestra, and they made rolls together and individually. Ohman was offered a role in the Paul Whiteman Orchestra, so he left QRS.

Ohman left Whiteman's orchestra upon realizing that his duets with Arden were more fulfilling, and the two of them played in clubs on 52nd Street, among other locations in midtown Manhattan. Arden and Ohman were featured in Samuel Roxy Rothafel's radio broadcasts from the Capitol Theatre, which began in 1923, and they were among the orchestras who performed at the banquet to the 1924 Eastern Sales Conference. Following the performances, they were discovered by Broadway employer George Gershwin, and were signed to Columbia Records and Victor Records. They served as the pit orchestra for Broadway shows such as Lady, Be Good (1924), Tip-Toes (1926) and Spring Is Here (1929), and recorded songs such as "I Love a Parade", "Morning Glories" and "I'm in Love with You". They also performed arrangements of other songs, including Walter Donaldson's "At Sundown" (1927), "Lover, Come Back to Me" (1929), and Scott Joplin's "Maple Leaf Rag" in 1930. After the orchestra dissolved in 1933, Arden formed another duo with pianist Phil Wall called Arden & Arden.
