= The Voice of Frank Sinatra =

Studio album by Frank Sinatra
- Released: March 4, 1946
- Recorded: July 30, 1945 Hollywood; December 7, 1945 New York City
- Genre: Traditional pop
- Length: 24:01
- Labels: Columbia C-112 (78 rpm); Columbia CL-6001 (33 rpm); Legacy CK62100

Frank Sinatra chronology
The Voice of Frank Sinatra (1946)	Songs by Sinatra (1947)

Alternative cover
- The 1948 reissue as the first LP record developed by Columbia Records

Professional ratings
Review scores
Source	Rating
Allmusic	4/5 stars

The Voice of Frank Sinatra is the debut studio album by American singer Frank Sinatra, released by Columbia Records (catalogue number C-112) on March 4, 1946. The album was originally issued as a set of four 78 rpm records, comprising eight songs in total. Each disc was released under the Columbia catalog numbers 36918, 36919, 36920, and 36921.

Upon its release, the album reached number one on the then-fledgling Billboard chart, where it remained at the top for seven consecutive weeks in 1946 and spent a total of eighteen weeks on the chart overall. At the time, the album chart featured only a Top Five ranking, a format that continued until August 1948.

== Content ==
The tracks were arranged and conducted by Axel Stordahl and his orchestra, on both dates consisting of a string quartet and four-piece rhythm section, augmented by flutist John Mayhew in July, and, given the part he played with Sinatra at Columbia in the early 1950s, oboist Mitch Miller in December. Sinatra recorded most of these songs again at later stages in his career.

Certain critics have claimed The Voice to be the first concept album. Beginning in 1939, however, singer Lee Wiley started releasing albums of 78s dedicated to the songs of a single writer, such as Cole Porter, a precursor to the Songbooks sets formulated by Norman Granz and Ella Fitzgerald in 1956. These may loosely be termed concept albums, although with The Voice, Sinatra inaugurated his practice of having a common mood, theme, or instrumentation tying the songs together on a specific release. Sinatra also held the songs recorded for albums from release as singles. Even after an album’s release the songs were not released as singles.

It also holds the distinction of being the first pop album catalogue item at 33⅓ rpm, when Columbia premiered long-playing vinyl records in 1948, ten-inch and twelve-inch format for classical music, ten-inch only for pop. The Voice was reissued as a 10-inch LP, catalogue number CL 6001 in 1948, with the running order altered from the sequence of the original album of 78s. It was also later issued as two 45 rpm EPs in 1952 with catalogue number B-112, a 12-inch LP with a changed running order including only five of the original tracks in 1955 with catalogue number CL-743, and a compact disc with extra tracks in 2003.

== Track listing ==
=== 10-inch LP release ===
Side one
No.	Title	Writer(s)	Length
1.	"You Go to My Head" (Columbia 36918)	Haven Gillespie, J. Fred Coots	3:00
2.	"Someone to Watch Over Me" (Columbia 36921)	George Gershwin, Ira Gershwin	3:18
3.	"These Foolish Things" (Columbia 36919)	Holt Marvell, Jack Strachey, Harry Link	3:08
4.	"Why Shouldn't I?" (Columbia 36920)	Cole Porter	2:53

Side two
No.	Title	Writer(s)	Length
1.	"I Don't Know Why" (Columbia 36918)	Roy Turk, Fred E. Ahlert	2:46
2.	"Try a Little Tenderness" (Columbia 36920)	Harry M. Woods, James Campbell, Reginald Connelly	3:08
3.	"I Don't Stand a Ghost of a Chance with You" (Columbia 36919)	Bing Crosby, Ned Washington, Victor Young	3:11
4.	"Paradise" (Columbia 36921)	Nacio Herb Brown, Gordon Clifford	2:37

=== 2003 reissue bonus tracks ===
No.	Title	Writer(s)	Length
9.	"Mam'selle"	Mack Gordon, Edmund Goulding	3:26
10.	"That Old Feeling"	Lew Brown, Sammy Fain	3:19
11.	"If I Had You"	Ted Shapiro, Campbell, Connelly	3:01
12.	"The Nearness of You"	Ned Washington, Hoagy Carmichael	2:41
13.	"Spring is Here"	Richard Rodgers, Lorenz Hart	2:42
14.	"Fools Rush In"	Johnny Mercer, Rube Bloom	3:01
15.	"When You Awake"	Henry Nemo	3:07
16.	"It Never Entered My Mind"	Rodgers, Hart	3:09
17.	"Always"	Irving Berlin	2:55
18.	"(I Don't Stand) A Ghost of A Chance (with You)" (alternate take)	Crosby, Washington, Young	3:32

=== 1955 track listing ===
Side one
No.	Title	Writer(s)	Length
1.	"I Don't Know Why (I Just Do)"	Turk, Ahlert	2:43
2.	"Try a Little Tenderness"	Woods, Campbell, Connelly	3:03
3.	"(I Don't Stand) A Ghost of A Chance (with You)"	Crosby, Washington, Young	3:16
4.	"Paradise"	Brown, Clifford	2:41
5.	"These Foolish Things (Remind Me of You)"	Marvell, Strachey, Link	3:15
6.	"Laura"	Johnny Mercer, David Raksin	3:17

Side two
No.	Title	Writer(s)	Length
1.	"She's Funny That Way"	Neil Moret, Richard A. Whiting	3:25
2.	"Fools Rush In (Where Angels Fear to Tread)"	Mercer, Bloom	3:04
3.	"Over The Rainbow"	Yip Harburg, Harold Arlen	3:20
4.	"That Old Black Magic"	Mercer, Arlen	2:37
5.	"Spring Is Here"	Rodgers, Hart	2:42
6.	"Lover"	Rodgers, Hart	2:39

== Personnel ==
- Frank Sinatra – vocal
- Axel Stordahl – arranger

=== New York sessions ===
- Leonard Posner. Raoul Polikian – violins
- Sidney Brecher – viola
- Anthony Sophos – cello
- Mitch Miller – oboe
- Matty Golizio – guitar
- Bill Clifton – piano
- Frank Siravo – bass
- Nat Polen – drums

=== Hollywood sessions ===
- Mischa Russell, David Frisina – violins
- Sam Freed – viola
- Fred Goerner – cello
- Jack Mayhew – flute
- George Van Eps – guitar
- Mark McIntyre – piano
- John Ryan – bass
- Ray Hagan – drums

=== Production personnel ===
- Bill Richards – producer
- Charles L. Granata, Didier C. Deutsch – compact disc reissue producers

== Charts ==
Weekly Charts

Chart (1946)	Peak position
US Billboard Best-Selling Popular Record Albums	1

Year-end charts

Chart (1946)	Position
US Billboard Best-Selling Popular Record Albums	2
