= Sing and Dance with Frank Sinatra =

Swing and Dance with Frank Sinatra
- cover of 1996 reissue

Studio album by Frank Sinatra
- Released: October 16, 1950
- Recorded: April 14 and April 24, 1950, New York City, except tr.4 July 10, 1949 (original)
- Genres: Vocal jazz; traditional pop
- Length: 50:05 (re-issue)
- Label: Columbia

Frank Sinatra chronology
| Dedicated to You (1950) | Swing and Dance with Frank Sinatra (1950) | Songs for Young Lovers (1954) |

Professional ratings
Review scores
| Source | Rating |
|---|---|
| Allmusic | 4/5 stars |
| Allmusic | (Re-issue) |

Sing and Dance with Frank Sinatra is the sixth studio album by Frank Sinatra. The tracks were arranged and conducted by George Siravo and his orchestra (except for track four, which was conducted by Hugo Winterhalter). Original Columbia 10-inch 33 1/3-rpm LP and 78-rpm album set released October 16, 1950; the 7-inch 45-rpm EP and EP box sets were released in October 1952. (See Gramophone record for an explanation of these formats.)

It would prove to be the final album that Sinatra released under the Columbia label, another three years before he would start recording for Capitol and another year after that before his next album, entitled Songs for Young Lovers, would be released in 1954. Six of the eight songs on this LP would be remade for one of his contractual obligation albums to Capitol, Sinatra's Swingin' Session!!!.

For its compact disc reissue in 1996, alternate versions of six songs – including "I've Got a Crush on You" and "All of Me" – are included. The extra songs in this compilation, titled slightly differently as Swing and Dance with Frank Sinatra, were recorded between 1944 and 1951.

== Personnel ==
- Frank Sinatra - Vocals
- Musicians - 1949 : Hugo Winterhalter (conductor), Yank Lawson, Carl Poole, Russ Solomon (trumpets), John D'Agostino, Buddy Morrow a.k.a. Moe Zydecoff, William Pritchard (trombones), Ernie Caceres (baritone saxophone/clarinet/alto saxophone), Wolf Taninbaum, Henry Ross (tenor saxophone/clarinet), Toots Mondello, Sid Cooper (alto saxophone/clarinet), Johnny Guarnieri (piano), Al Caiola (guitar), Trigger Alpert (bass), Terry Snyder (drums)
- Musicians - 1950 : George Siravo (conductor), Billy Butterfield, Steve Lipkins, Carl Poole, Pinky Savitt (trumpets), George Arus, William Rausch (trombones), Ernie Caceres (baritone saxophone/clarinet/alto saxophone), Emmett Callen (alto saxophone), Art Drelinger (alto saxophone/clarinet/oboe/bass clarinet), Leonard Hartman (tenor saxophone/clarinet/bass clarinet), Jimmy Horvath (alto saxophone), Jerry Jerome (tenor saxophone/clarinet), Babe Russin (tenor saxophone), Hymie Schertzer (alto saxophone/clarinet/baritone saxophone), Ken Lane (piano/celeste), Bernie Leighton (piano), Allan Reuss (guitar), Phil Stephens (bass), Johnny Blowers (drums)

Expanded CD produced by Charles L. Granata & Didier C. Deutsch

== Track listing ==
=== Original ("Sing and Dance with Frank Sinatra") ===
| Track | Song Title | Originally By | Length |
|---|---|---|---|
| 1. | Lover | Richard Rodgers and Lorenz Hart | 2:39 |
| 2. | It's Only a Paper Moon | Billy Rose, E.Y. Harburg and Harold Arlen | 1:55 |
| 3. | My Blue Heaven | G. Whiting and Walter Donaldson | 2:28 |
| 4. | It All Depends on You | B.G. DeSylva, Lew Brown and Ray Henderson | 2:43 |
| 5. | You Do Something to Me | Cole Porter | 2:33 |
| 6. | Should I | Arthur Freed and Nacio Herb Brown | 2:03 |
| 7. | The Continental | Herb Magidson and C. Conrad | 2:30 |
| 8. | When You're Smiling | Fisher, Goodwin and Shay | 2:28 |

=== Re-issue ("Swing and Dance with Frank Sinatra") track listing ===
| Track | Song Title | Originally By | Length |
|---|---|---|---|
| 1. | *Saturday Night (Is the Loneliest Night of the Week) | J. Styne, Sammy Cahn | 2:43 |
| 2. | *All of Me | S. Simons and G. Marks | 2:44 |
| 3. | I've Got a Crush on You | George Gershwin and Ira Gershwin | 3:13 |
| 4. | *The Hucklebuck | R. Alfred and A. Gibson | 3:02 |
| 5. | *It All Depends on You | B.G. DeSylva, Lew Brown and Ray Henderson | 2:43 |
| 6. | **Bye Bye Baby | J. Styne and Leo Robin | 2:44 |
| 7. | All of Me | S. Simons and G. Marks | 2:46 |
| 8. | Should I | Arthur Freed and Nacio Herb Brown | 2:24 |
| 9. | You Do Something to Me | Cole Porter | 2:33 |
| 10. | Lover | Richard Rodgers, Lorenz Hart | 2:39 |
| 11. | When You're Smiling (The Whole World Smiles With You) | Fisher, Goodwin and Shay | 2:28 |
| 12. | It's Only a Paper Moon | Billy Rose, E.Y. Harburg and Harold Arlen | 1:55 |
| 13. | My Blue Heaven | G. Whiting and Walter Donaldson | 2:28 |
| 14. | The Continental | Herb Magidson and C. Conrad | 2:31 |
| 15. | *Meet Me at the Copa | Axel Stordahl, Sammy Cahn | 3:11 |
| 16. | *Nevertheless (I'm in Love with You) | Harry Ruby and Bert Kalmar | 3:08 |
| 17. | *There's Something Missing | Rule, O'Brien, Benjamin, Weiss and Downey | 3:18 |
| 18. | ***Farewell, Farewell to Love | J. Wolf and George Siravo | 2:54 |

All tracks arranged and conducted by George Siravo except for the marked songs:

* arranged & conducted by Axel Stordahl
** arranged & conducted by Hugo Winterhalter
*** arranged & conducted by Harry James
