= Connie Francis at the Copa =

Live album by Connie Francis
- Released: January 1961
- Recorded: 1961 (live)
- Venues: Copacabana, New York City, New York
- Genres: Traditional pop; Pop
- Length: 31 minutes 40 seconds
- Labels: MGM; E/3913 (M); SE/3913 (S)

Connie Francis chronology
| Songs to a Swinging Band (1960) | Connie Francis at the Copa (1961) | Sing Along with Connie Francis (1961) |

Connie Francis at the Copa is the first live album by American singer Connie Francis, released in January 1961 by MGM Records. The project saw her debut at the Copacabana nightclub. Connie Francis at the Copa received mostly positive critical reception and also reached the charts.

== Background, recording, and content ==
In 1961, Connie Francis was still having regular pop hits and topped the charts with several singles. This led her to finally debut at the popular Copacabana nightclub in New York City. It contained a total of 10 tracks, with several of them being medleys with specific themes; Jewish medley featuring two popular tunes of the ethnicity, and an Al Jolson medley, spotlighting his five most popular songs. The album contained live renditions of two of her hits: "Many Tears Ago," which hit the US pop top-10 in 1960, and "Mamma", originally from 1959. The rest of the tracks were cover songs, such as "Smack Dab in the Middle", "It All Depends on You", and "When the Saints Go Marching In". The orchestra was arranged and conducted by Joe Mele.

== Critical reception ==
Professional ratings
Review scores
| Source | Rating |
|---|---|
| AllMusic | 3.5/5 stars |
| The Encyclopedia of Popular Music | 2/5 stars |
| Cashbox | Positive (Pop Pick Album) |
| High Fidelity | Favorable |

=== Contemporary reaction ===
Connie Francis at the Copa was given a positive critical response following its release, and Francis was noted for making the Copa room lively. Cashbox magazine stated that "When it was Connie Francis' turn to wow the Copa customers, MGM was on hand to catch the highlights of her act. She proved a poised and talented in-person performer utilizing such vehicles as 'It All Depends On You,' 'Smack Dab In The Middle,' 'When The Saints Go Marching In,' and a memorable Al Jolson medley of five of his songs." The publication called it "An exciting disk date with huge sales potential." Also calling it exciting, John F. Indcox of High Fidelity added that "she displays an astonishing assurance and sense of showmanship for so young an entertainer."

=== Retrospective reviews ===
Joe Viglione stated on AllMusic decades later that "Connie Francis at the Copa is a decent document of the immortal pop singer performing live in New York City." He noted that she put "emphasis on standards more than her hits." He believed that "The sound quality for a major release on MGM is shockingly low, on the level of a good bootleg." The album was given a two-star rating by the Encyclopedia of Popular Music, meaning the album was "flawed in some way", while getting a three-and-a-half star rating from AllMusic.

== Release and chart performance ==
Connie Francis at the Copa was released by MGM Records in January 1961 and was the first live album of her career. The album was offered as a vinyl LP in multiple territories. It did not receive any single releases, but it successfully reached the LP charts. The album debuted on Billboard magazine's Top LP's chart in the issue dated May 14, 1961, peaking at No. 65 in the summer during a nineteen-week run on the chart.

== Track listing ==
Side One
| No. | Title | Writer(s) | Length |
|---|---|---|---|
| 1. | "Ol' Man Mose" | Louis Armstrong; Zilner T. Randolph | 2:00 |
| 2. | "It All Depends on You" | Ray Henderson; Buddy G. DeSylva; Lew Brown | 2:28 |
| 3. | "Many Tears Ago" | Winfield Scott | 1:32 |
| 4. | "You Always Hurt the One You Love" | Allan Roberts; Doris Fisher | 2:33 |
| 5. | "Jewish Medley" ("Shein Vi De L'Vone"/"Dance Everyone Dance") | Chaim Towber; Joseph Rumshinsky; Sid Danoff; G. Shaw | 2:49 |
| 6. | "Jealous Of You" | Vittorio Mascheroni; Peppino Mendes; Marjorie Harper | 2:39 |
| 7. | "Mamma" | Cesare Andrea Bixio; Bixio Cherubini; Harold Barlow; Phil Brito | 4:05 |

Side One
| No. | Title | Writer(s) | Length |
|---|---|---|---|
| 8. | "Smack Dab in the Middle" | Charles Calhoun | 2:06 |
| 9. | "Al Jolson Medley" ("You Made Me Love You (I Didn't Want To Do It)"/"Swanee"/"Rock-A-Bye Your Baby With a Dixie Melody"/"My Mammy"/"Toot, Toot, Tootsie (Goo' Bye!)") | James V. Monaco; Joseph McCarthy; George Gershwin; Irving Caesar; Jean Schwartz; Sam M. Lewis; Joe Young; Walter Donaldson; Joe Young; Sam M. Lewis | 7:15 |
| 10. | "American Medley" ("When the Saints Go Marching In"/"Bill Bailey, Won't You Please Come Home") | G. Shaw (adapted traditional songs) | 4:09 |
| Total length: | | | 31:40 |

== Chart performance ==
Chart performance for Connie Francis at the Copa
| Chart (1961) | Peak position |
|---|---|
| US Billboard Top LPs (150 Best-Selling Monaural LP's) | 65 |

== Release history ==
Release history and formats for Connie Francis at the Copa
| Region | Date | Format | Label | Ref. |
|---|---|---|---|---|
| North America (US, Canada, Mexico) | January 1961 | Vinyl (LP) | MGM | |
| Australia | April 1961 | Vinyl (LP) | MGM | |
| Japan | June 1961 | Vinyl (LP) | MGM | |
| Brazil | September 1961 | Vinyl (LP) | MGM | |
| United Kingdom | October 1961 | Vinyl (LP) | MGM | |
| South Africa | Late 1961 | Vinyl (LP) | MGM | |
| Worldwide | Circa 2020s | Digital; streaming | Universal Music Group | |
