= All-Star Trio =

American musical ensemble (1918–1923)

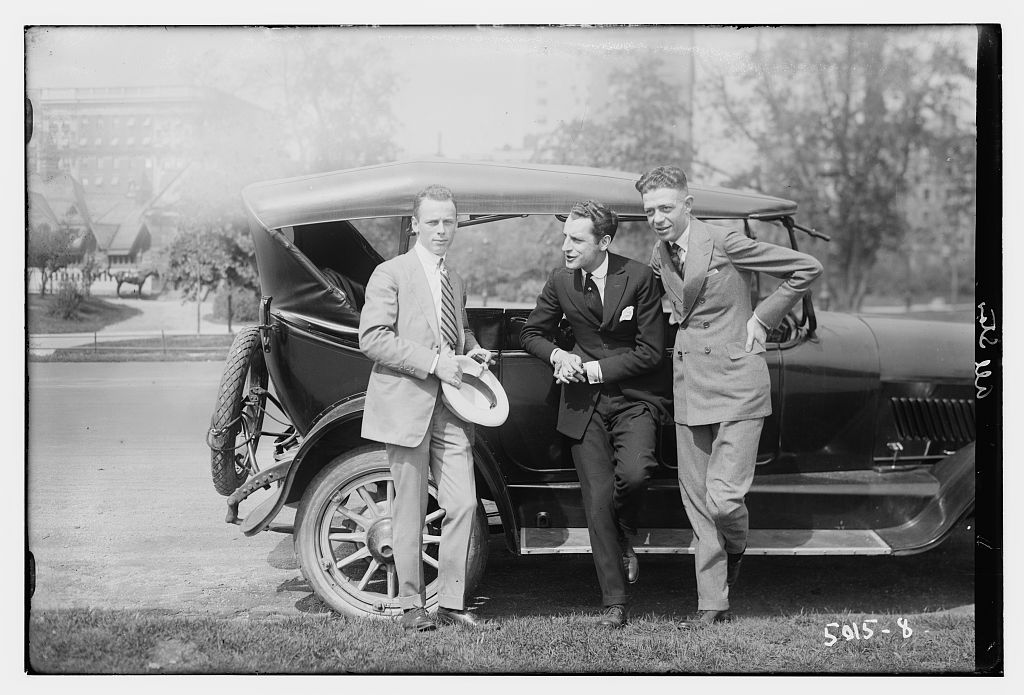
- All-Star Trio (1918)

Background information
- Also known as: All Star Trio
- Origin: New York City
- Genres: Pop music
- Years active: 1918–1923
- Labels: Aeolian Vocalion; Brunswick; Edison; His Master's Voice; Lyric; Okeh; Victor

The All-Star Trio or All Star Trio was an American musical ensemble consisting of George Hamilton Green on the xylophone along with Frank Banta or Victor Arden on the piano and F. Wheeler Wadsworth on the saxophone. It was among the most popular musical outfits of the very early Jazz Age. Their music was promoted as "dance music".

== History ==
The group began recording in 1918. In 1920 they toured in support of the Aeolian Vocalion company. Their popularity was such that their recordings were released overseas by The Gramophone Company in their French catalog. The trio made additional recordings for Brunswick Records, Edison Records, Lyric Records Okeh Records, and Pathé Records. However, they are most associated with the Victor Records label, and are prominently featured in Victor advertising of the era. Joel Whitburn, in his chart recreations, estimates that the Trio had the equivalent of 6 top-20 hits between 1919 and 1921, including "I'll Say She Does", "I Want a Daddy Who Will Rock Me to Sleep", "Poor Little Butterfly Is a Fly Gal Now", "You'd Be Surprised", "Swanee", and "Moonbeams", all for Victor.

== Style ==
Recorded performances are usually performed in March-style, played "straight" through the first strain, and then the second strain would include improvisation, increased rhythmic values, and often a melodic tempo speeding of up to four-times the original timing.
