= Sing Along with Connie Francis =

Studio album by Connie Francis
- Released: 1961
- Label: Mati-Mor

Connie Francis chronology
Songs to a Swinging Band (1961)	Sing Along with Connie Francis (1961)	Connie Francis Sings "Never on Sunday" (1961)

Sing Along with Connie Francis is a studio album by American singer Connie Francis. Produced for a promotional campaign of Beecham's Brylcreem, it was sold in a bundle with a tube of the product in September–October 1961.

== Content ==
Sing Along with Connie Francis consisted of covers of nostalgic vintage songs, like "Home on the Range" and "Auld Lang Syne". None of the songs on the album had been recorded by Francis before.

The recording was arranged by Cliff Parman and conducted by Joe Mele. The singer was backed up by The Jordanaires.

== Background ==
The LP was recorded as part of promotion for Brylcreem, a brand of hair cream by Beecham, and was sold in a bundle with a tube of the product for the combined price of $1.69. The deal was notably advertised on a one-hour television special titled The Connie Francis Show (with Francis as the headliner), that aired on ABC-TV on September 13, 1961, from 9 to 10 p.m.

The LP's back cover featured an advertisement for Silvikrin shampoo.

In February 1962, Billboard magazine reported Francis and MGM Records had filed a suit against Eljay Corporation stating Francis had recorded the album "solely for [a] promotional venture" that was to run for five weeks and conclude on October 14, 1961, and "Eljay breached the contract by offering the albums left over from the campaign to disk stores" at "prices as low as 59 cents", and that this was "damaging the sale of [Francis'] regularly priced LPs on MGM". The suit sought $40,000 "for recording purposes". According to Billboard, Sam Goody had bought the LPs wholesale for 31 cents and, earlier that month, ran a campaign in New York City newspapers advertising them at 59 cents. Goody told the magazine: "There must be close to a million of those LPs stacked up in the company's warehouse. There are plenty for everybody."

== Critical reception ==
Professional ratings
Review scores
Source	Rating
AllMusic	2/5 stars

In a retrospective review for AllMusic, William Ruhlmann gave Sing Along with Connie Francis two stars on a scale of 5, saying that Francis was in "typically strong voice", but the musical arrangements did her a disservice. He also remarked on the album's audio quality, stating that it did not measure up to the singer's usual "MGM standards". He also noted that on this record, Francis was "making hokey exhortations" like "Come on, everybody!", urging listeners to sing along.

== Track listing ==
LP (Mati-Mor Superecords 8002)

Side 1
No.	Title	Length
1.	"Sing Along"	2:23
2.	"Home on the Range"	2:14
3.	"My Wild Irish Rose"	2:13
4.	"I Love You Truly"	3:01
5.	"Tavern in the Town"	2:01

Side 2
No.	Title	Length
1.	"And the Band Played On"	2:30
2.	"You Tell Me Your Dream"	2:23
3.	"Down in the Valley"	2:19
4.	"In the Good Old Summertime"	2:04
5.	"Auld Lang Syne"	1:54
