= Songs to a Swinging Band =

Studio album by Connie Francis
- Released: December 1960
- Recorded: October 11 – 13, 1960
- Genre: Vocal jazz
- Labels: MGM Records; E-3893 (mono)/SE-3893 (stereo)
- Producer: Arnold Maxin

Connie Francis chronology
More Italian Favorites (1960)	Songs to a Swinging Band (1960)	Connie Francis at the Copa (1961)

Songs to a Swinging Band is a studio album recorded by American singer Connie Francis.

The album was recorded from October 11 to 13, 1960 in New York under the musical direction of Richard "Dick" Wess.

The album was released in late 1960. Several of the album's songs were released in Asia on singles.

The closing track, "Swanee", saw a limited single release in the U. S. when it was featured on MGM Records Single K 13005 as the B-side of "Atashi-no", Francis' Japanese recording of Where the Boys Are.

== Track listing ==
=== Side A ===
#	Title	Songwriter	Length
1.	"You're Nobody 'til Somebody Loves You"	Russ Morgan, Larry Stock, James Cavanaugh	2.34
2.	"Ol' Man Mose"	Louis Armstrong, Zilner T. Randolph	3.05
3.	"How Long Has This Been Goin' On?"	George Gershwin, Ira Gershwin	3.00
4.	"My Love, My Love"	Nicholas Acquaviva, Bob Haymes	2.45
5.	"It Might As Well Be Spring"	Oscar Hammerstein II, Richard Rodgers	4.14
6.	"Taboo"	Ernesto Lecuona	2.19

=== Side B ===
#	Title	Songwriter	Length
1.	"Love Is Where You Find It"	Nacio Herb Brown, Earl Brent	2.17
2.	"I Got Lost in His Arms"	Irving Berlin	2.48
3.	"Dat's Love"	Georges Bizet, Oscar Hammerstein II	2.05
4.	"Angel Eyes"	Matt Dennis, Earl Brent	3.07
5.	"Gone With the Wind"	Allie Wrubel, Herb Magidson	2.41
6.	"Swanee"	George Gershwin, Irving Caesar	2.23
