= Green Brothers Novelty Band =

Recording ensemble (1918–1939

- Origin: Omaha, Nebraska
- Past members: Joe Green; George Hamilton Green; Lew Green

The Green Brothers Novelty Band was a recording ensemble active from 1918 to 1939. The group was led by brothers Joe Green (1892–1939) and George Hamilton Green (1893–1970), xylophone artists along with younger brother Lew Green (1909–1992), on banjo, from Omaha, Nebraska.

In the beginning of the Green Brothers Novelty Band's career, George and Joe Green played xylophones, accompanied by brass instruments including trumpet, trombone, and tuba. The music they recorded consisted primarily of dance music, such as the Foxtrot and One-Step, and to a lesser extent, Waltzes. Occasionally, a vocalist was used to sing for a single chorus. After about 10 years of this instrumentation, the Green brothers added saxophone and banjo to the group. The banjo was played by Lew Green, the younger brother of George Hamilton Green and Joe Green. This ensemble recorded hundreds of sides for virtually all the 78 rpm record companies during the acoustic recording period, including Victor, Columbia, Edison, Okeh, Emerson, Vocalion, Pathe, and others.

In 1925, electrical recording replaced the acoustical method, resulting in greater volume, range, and fidelity from 78 rpm records. By the 1930s, popular music for listening and dancing had changed dramatically from the 1920s. The Green brothers adapted to both the finer recorded tonal qualities, as well as newer musical tastes. Violins replaced the trumpets, Joe Green switched from the xylophone to the marimba, upright bass replaced the tuba, and saxophones were featured more prominently. These instrumentation changes created a mellower sound to the group, whose name was changed to Green Brothers Novelty Orchestra, or Green Brothers Marimba Orchestra. The Green Brothers Orchestra's music at that time featured more waltzes and popular songs, replacing the old Foxtrots and One-Steps.

During the late 1920s, in addition to making phonograph records, the Green brothers began performing live radio programs. Such radio shows typically were sponsored by a commercial company, and named for that company or its products. The Shinola shoe polish company sponsored many Green brothers 1920's broadcasts, leading to the use of the group name Shinola Merrymakers. When Walt Disney needed a soundtrack for the Mickey Mouse short "Steamboat Willie" in 1928, he sold the Moon roadster he had owned since 1926 and paid the Green brothers to play the music. In order to keep the music in sync with the pictures, a bouncing-ball method was used.

In the 1930s, in addition to making phonograph records, the Green brothers began recording pre-recorded programs for use by radio stations. These discs, referred to as Electrical Transcriptions, were pressed on 12-inch or 16-inch vinyl discs played at 33 rpm, and containing two to four tracks per side.

The early death of the group's co-leader Joe Green in 1939 affected the viability of this musical organization. Not only was Joe a lead musician in the group, but he also served as the organization's business manager and booking agent. Subsequently, in 1940 George Hamilton Green retired from music, and the group's 22-year tenure came to an end. Following George's retirement from the music business, he relocated to Woodstock, New York, and worked as a cartoonist from his home. His cartoons were featured in The Saturday Evening Post and Colliers. He died in 1970.
