= You'd Be Surprised =

1919 song by Irving Berlin

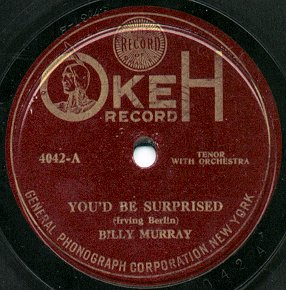
- You'd Be Surprised

Composition by Irving Berlin
- Written: 1919
- Songwriter: Irving Berlin

"You'd Be Surprised" is a song written by Irving Berlin in 1919. The song was interpolated into the Broadway musicals Oh, What A Girl! (1919) and Ziegfeld Follies of 1919. It was sung by Eddie Cantor in the latter production, and he went on to make a hit recording of the song. Other popular versions in 1920 were by the All-Star Trio and by Irving Kaufman.

== Lyrics ==
The first verse introduces the shy Johnny and the woman Mary who finds him to be an exceptional lover, although apparently no one else ever has. She explains his appeal in the first chorus. By the second verse, Mary's talking-up of Johnny has resulted in him now being very popular with the ladies. The song leaves any questions about Mary's status unanswered.

The first chorus mentions the Morris Chair, made popular in America by furniture maker Gustav Stickley.

Part of first verse:

Johnny was bashful and shy;
Nobody understood why
Mary loved him
All the other girls passed him by.

Everyone wanted to know
How she could pick such a beau

With a twinkle in her eye
She made this reply

Parts of various choruses:

He's not so good in a crowd
But when you get him alone
You'd be surprised;

He's kind of scared in a mob
But when he takes you home
You'd be surprised.

He won't impress you
Right from the start
But in a week or two
You'd be surprised.

At a party or a ball
I've got to admit he's nothing at all
But in a Morris chair
You'd be surprised

Part of second verse:

Mary continued to praise
Johnny's remarkable ways
To the ladies
And you know advertising pays

Now Johnny's ne'er alone
He has the busiest phone
Almost every other day
A new girl will say

== Cover versions ==
- Other chart versions in the USA were by Orrin Tucker (vocal by Bonnie Baker) in 1940 and by Johnnie Ray in 1954.
- The song was recorded by a number of other artists, including Billy Murray on November 19, 1919, for Victor (No. 18634A). Five years later in 1924, Murray would record a similar-themed tune called "Charley, My Boy", which included an instrumental referback to this one.
- The Hoosier Hot Shots covered the song in 1942.
- The song was revived by Olga San Juan in the 1946 Bing Crosby/Fred Astaire film, Blue Skies.
- The song was also memorably recorded by Marilyn Monroe in 1954 - with alternate lyrics. It is available on the Marilyn Monroe compilation album titled Anthology.
- Kathy Linden released a version of the song as a single in 1958 that reached No. 50 on the Billboard pop chart.
- Burl Ives included the song on his album Burl Ives Sings Irving Berlin in 1960.
- Madeline Kahn sang it at Carnegie Hall in 1988 for Berlin's 100 Birthday Celebration.
- Additionally, rock band White Hassle recorded a cover of the song for their 2005 album Your Language.
