= Daniel E. Kelley =

American musician (1843–1905)

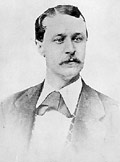
Daniel E. Kelley

Daniel E. Kelley (Rhode Island, February 1843 – Iowa, 1905) was a musician and entertainer, who after moving to Kansas in 1872, wrote the music for "Home on the Range" (following lyrics by Brewster M. Higley), which became the state song. Kelley played violin with his brothers-in-law in the Harlan Brothers Band, but was primarily a carpenter by trade. He married Mary E. Harlan in Kansas and they had four children. He moved to Iowa in 1889 and died of a stroke there in 1905. He was buried in Fairview Cemetery, Waterloo, Iowa.
