= Frank Sinatra with the Red Norvo Quintet: Live in Australia, 1959 =

With the Red Norvo Quintet: Live in Australia, 1959

Live album by Frank Sinatra
- Released: April 8, 1997
- Recorded: March 31 – April 1, 1959
- Venue: West Melbourne Stadium, Melbourne, Australia
- Genre: Vocal jazz; traditional pop
- Length: 57:53
- Label: Blue Note
- Producer: Max Hull

Frank Sinatra chronology
The Complete Capitol Singles Collection (1996)	With the Red Norvo Quintet: Live in Australia, 1959 (1997)	The Very Best of Frank Sinatra (1997)

Professional ratings
Review scores
Source	Rating
AllMusic	4.5/5 stars
Christgau's Consumer Guide	A−

With the Red Norvo Quintet: Live in Australia, 1959 is a live album by American singer Frank Sinatra, recorded in 1959 but not released until 1997.

These tapes were recorded by Max Hull, Venue Audio Engineer, at Festival Hall Melbourne during the two stops on Sinatra's brief Australian tour of 1959, during which he was backed by the quintet of jazz vibraphonist Red Norvo. It is considered one of the wildest performances Sinatra ever recorded, as he exhibits great freedom in his lyric choice, often switching and twisting entire phrases. For example, just as Sinatra begins "I've Got You Under My Skin", a woman in the audience screams. He responds between lyrics with "Get your hand off that broad!"

== Track listing ==
1. "Perdido" (Instrumental) (Ervin Drake, Hans Jan Lengsfelder, Juan Tizol) – 5:22
2. "Between the Devil and the Deep Blue Sea" (Instrumental) (Harold Arlen, Ted Koehler) – 5:08
3. "I Could Have Danced All Night" (Alan Jay Lerner, Frederick Loewe) – 2:45
4. "Just One of Those Things" (Cole Porter) – 2:30
5. "I Get a Kick Out of You" (Porter) – 3:05
6. "At Long Last Love" (Porter) – 2:26
7. "Willow Weep for Me" (Ann Ronell) – 3:49
8. "I've Got You Under My Skin" (Porter) – 3:15
9. "Moonlight in Vermont" (John Blackburn, Karl Suessdorf) – 3:43
10. "The Lady is a Tramp" (Lorenz Hart, Richard Rodgers) – 4:41
11. "Sinatra Speaks" – 1:34
12. "Angel Eyes" (Earl Brent, Matt Dennis) – 2:53
13. "Come Fly with Me" (Sammy Cahn, Jimmy Van Heusen) – 2:53
14. "All the Way" (Cahn, Van Heusen) – 2:40
15. "Dancing in the Dark" (Howard Dietz, Arthur Schwartz) – 2:17
16. "One for My Baby (And One More for the Road)" (Arlen, Johnny Mercer) – 5:14
17. "All of Me" (Gerald Marks, Seymour Simons) – 3:02
18. "On the Road to Mandalay" (Oley Speaks, Rudyard Kipling) – 4:15
19. "Night and Day" (Porter) – 4:16

== Personnel ==
- Frank Sinatra – vocals
- Red Norvo – vibraphone
- Jerry Dodgion – flute, alto saxophone
- Bill Miller – piano
- Jimmy Wyble – guitar
- Red Wooten – bass
- John Markham – drums
- Maxwell Hull – audio engineer
