= Christmas Songs by Sinatra =

Studio album by Frank Sinatra
- Released: October 4, 1948 (78 rpm and 10" LP)
- Recorded: November 14, 1944 – November 5, 1950
- Genres: Traditional pop; Christmas
- Length: 23:53
- Label: Columbia

Frank Sinatra chronology
Songs by Sinatra (1947)	Christmas Songs by Sinatra (1948)	Frankly Sentimental (1949)

Professional ratings
Review scores
Source	Rating
AllMusic	3/5 stars

Christmas Songs by Sinatra is the third studio album by the American singer Frank Sinatra. It was released on October 4, 1948, as a 78 rpm album set of four 78 rpm records in an actual album and as a 10-inch LP record (CL 6019) featuring a collection of eight holiday songs. It included four songs previously released as singles, one recorded four years earlier in 1944, and four songs not released as singles, one recorded July 3, 1947 ("Have Yourself a Merry Little Christmas") and three recorded on December 28, 1947, for the album.

Columbia reissued the album several times in later years with alternate track listings and different artwork. 1957 saw the first 12" release as Christmas Dreaming (CL 1032) with the addition of "Christmas Dreaming (A Little Early This Year)" (recorded July 3, 1947) and "Let It Snow! Let It Snow! Let It Snow!" (recorded November 5, 1950), though the latter was dropped from later releases when the album was reissued and retitled as Have Yourself a Merry Little Christmas (Harmony HS 11200) in October 1966. This version peaked at No. 42 on Billboard's Best Bets For Christmas album chart on December 21, 1968.

A compilation album was released in 1994 including the eight songs released on the 1948 album (three original takes; five previously unreleased alternate takes) along with the two other Christmas songs he recorded at Columbia. It also includes an introduction by a general and four recording from rehearsals or broadcasts of songs performed on radio shows and issued only as V-Discs to American military during WW II.

A stylized paper craft version of the LP album with its original 1948 Christmas tree cover art is prominently featured in the official music video for Sinatra's "Let It Snow! Let It Snow! Let It Snow!". However, the 1948 version of the album did not contain the track.

== Track listing ==
=== 1948 78rpm 4-disc ===
Disc 1 (Columbia)

- A. "Silent Night" (8/27/45)
- B. "Adeste Fideles" "(All Ye Faithful)" (8/8/46)

Disc 2 (Columbia)

- A. "White Christmas" (11/14/44)
- B. "Jingle Bells" (8/8/46)

Disc 3 (Columbia)

- A. "O Little Town of Bethlehem" (12/28/47)
- B. "It Came Upon a Midnight Clear" (12/28/47)

Disc 4 (Columbia)

- A. "Have Yourself a Merry Little Christmas" (7/3/47)
- B. "Santa Claus is Comin' to Town" (12/28/47)

=== 1948 10" LP record (Columbia) ===
Side A

1. "White Christmas"
2. "Jingle Bells"
3. "Silent Night"
4. "Adeste Fideles"

Side B

1. "O Little Town of Bethlehem"
2. "It Came Upon a Midnight Clear"
3. "Have Yourself a Merry Little Christmas"
4. "Santa Claus is Comin' to Town"

=== 1994 compilation album: CD / Track listing ===
1. "White Christmas" (Irving Berlin) – 3:29+
2. "Silent Night" (Josef Mohr, Franz X. Gruber) – 3:16+
3. "Adeste Fideles (O, Come All Ye Faithful)" (Frederick Oakeley, John Francis Wade) – 2:36
4. "Jingle Bells" (James Pierpont) – 2:35+
5. "Have Yourself a Merry Little Christmas" (Ralph Blane, Hugh Martin) – 2:33
6. "Christmas Dreaming (A Little Early This Year)" (Irving Gordon, Lester Lee) – 2:57
7. "It Came Upon the Midnight Clear" (Edmund Sears, Richard Storrs Willis) – 3:31+
8. "O Little Town of Bethlehem" (Phillips Brooks, Lewis Redner) – 3:03
9. "Santa Claus is Coming to Town" (J. Fred Coots, Haven Gillespie) – 2:33+
10. "Let It Snow! Let It Snow! Let It Snow!" (Sammy Cahn, Jule Styne) – 2:35
11. Introduction by General Reynolds, Chief of Special Services – 0:59
12. Medley: "O, Little Town of Bethlehem"/"Joy to the World"/"White Christmas" (Brooks, Redner)/(Isaac Watts, Lowell Mason)/(Berlin) – 5:15
13. "Ave Maria" (Franz Schubert) – 3:28^
14. "Winter Wonderland" (Felix Bernard, Richard B. Smith) – 2:03^
15. "The Lord's Prayer" (Albert Hay Malotte) – 3:34^

+ previously unreleased alternate take

^ previously unreleased

== Charts ==
Chart performance for Christmas Songs by Sinatra
Chart (1948–2025)	Peak position
Dutch Albums (Album Top 100)	12
Finnish Albums (Suomen virallinen lista)	28
French Albums (SNEP)	166
French Jazz Albums (SNEP)	1
German Albums (Offizielle Top 100)	58
Italian Albums (FIMI)	64
Latvian Albums (LaIPA)	20
Lithuanian Albums (AGATA)	37
Norwegian Albums (VG-lista)	20
Swedish Albums (Sverigetopplistan)	28
US Billboard 200	71
