= Dedicated to You (Frank Sinatra album) =

Studio album by Frank Sinatra
- Released: March 1950
- Genre: Traditional pop
- Length: 24:02
- Label: Columbia

Frank Sinatra chronology
Frankly Sentimental (1949)	Dedicated to You (1950)	Sing and Dance with Frank Sinatra (1950)

Alternative cover

Dedicated to You is the fifth studio album by American singer Frank Sinatra, released in March 1950 as a set of four 78 rpm records (Catalog: C-197), as well as a 10" LP (CL 6096).

The tracks were arranged and conducted by Axel Stordahl and his orchestra.

== Releases ==
=== 78 rpm set ===
- "The Music Stopped"/”The Moon Was Yellow"
- "I Love You"/"Strange Music"
- "Where or When"/"None But the Lonely Heart"
- "Always"/"Why Was I Born?"

=== LP ===
No.	Title	Writer(s)	Length
1.	"The Music Stopped"	Jimmy McHugh, Harold Adamson	3:01
2.	"The Moon Was Yellow"	Fred E. Ahlert, Edgar Leslie	2:57
3.	"I Love You"	Cole Porter	2:40
4.	"Strange Music"	Edvard Grieg, George Forrest, Robert Wright	2:58
5.	"Where or When"	Richard Rodgers, Lorenz Hart	3:14
6.	"None But the Lonely Heart"	Pyotr Ilyich Tchaikovsky	3:32
7.	"Always"	Irving Berlin	2:57
8.	"Why Was I Born?"	Jerome Kern, Oscar Hammerstein II	2:43

== Personnel ==
- Frank Sinatra – Vocals
- Axel Stordahl – Arranger, conductor
