= George Van Eps =

American swing and jazz guitarist (1913–1998)

- George Van Eps in 1949

Background information
- Born: George Abel Van Eps; August 7, 1913; Plainfield, New Jersey, U.S.
- Died: November 29, 1998 (aged 85) Newport Beach, California, U.S.
- Genres: Jazz, swing
- Occupation: Musician
- Instrument: Seven-string guitar
- Years active: 1924–1998
- Labels: Euphoria, Capitol, Concord Jazz

George Abel Van Eps (August 7, 1913 – November 29, 1998) was an American swing and mainstream jazz guitarist.

== Biography ==
George Van Eps was born in Plainfield, New Jersey, United States, into a family of musicians. His three brothers – Fred Abel Van Eps, Jr. (1907–1980), Robert B. Van Eps (1909–1986), and John A. Van Eps (1912–1945) – were musicians. His mother, Louise Abel, was a classical pianist and his father, Fred Van Eps, was a ragtime banjoist and sound engineer. George Van Eps began playing banjo when he was eleven years old. After hearing Eddie Lang on the radio, he put down the banjo and devoted himself to guitar. By the age of thirteen, in 1926, he was performing on the radio. Through the middle of the 1930s, he played with Harry Reser, Smith Ballew, Freddy Martin, Benny Goodman, and Ray Noble.

Van Eps moved to California and spent most of his remaining career as a studio musician, playing on many commercials and movie soundtracks.

In the 1930s, he invented a model of guitar with another bass string added to the common six-string guitar. The seven-string guitar allowed him to play basslines below his chord voicings, unlike the single-string style of Charlie Christian and Django Reinhardt. He called his technique "lap piano". It anticipated the fingerpicking style of country guitarists Chet Atkins and Merle Travis and inspired jazz guitarists Bucky Pizzarelli, John Pizzarelli, and Howard Alden to pick up the seven-string.

Dixieland had a following in Los Angeles during the 1940s and 1950s, and he played in groups led by Bob Crosby and Matty Matlock and appeared in the film Pete Kelly's Blues. He played guitar on Frank Sinatra's 1955 album In the Wee Small Hours.

Van Eps played guitar into his eighties, having built a career that lasted over sixty years. He died of pneumonia in Newport Beach, California, on November 29, 1998, at the age of 85.

== Discography ==
=== As leader or co-leader ===
- 1949 Jump Presents George Van Eps (Jump)
- 1957 Mellow Guitar (Columbia)
- 1966 My Guitar (Columbia)
- 1967 George Van Eps' Seven-String Guitar (Capitol)
- 1967 Soliloquy (Capitol)
- 1991 Thirteen Strings with Howard Alden (Concord)
- 1992 Hand-Crafted Swing with Howard Alden (Concord)
- 1993 Seven & Seven with Howard Alden (Concord)
- 1994 Keepin' Time with Howard Alden (Concord)
- 1994 Legends (Concord) with Johnny Smith
- 2003 George Van Eps, Eddie Miller, and Stanley Wright (Jump)

=== As sideman ===
- 1947 The Voice of Frank Sinatra, Frank Sinatra
- 1953 Jam Session: Coast to Coast, Eddie Condon
- 1955 Pete Kelly's Blues, Ray Heindorf
- 1955 In the Wee Small Hours, Frank Sinatra
- 1956 Casa Loma in Hi-Fi!, Casa Loma Orchestra
- 1956 Songs for Swingin' Lovers!, Frank Sinatra
- 1957 Barrelhouse, Boogie, and the Blues, Ella Mae Morse
- 1957 Close to You, Frank Sinatra
- 1957 A Swingin' Affair!, Frank Sinatra
- 1958 And They Called It Dixieland, Matty Matlock
- 1958 Pete Kelly Lets His Hair Down, Matty Matlock
- 1960 Swingin' Decade, Casa Loma Orchestra
- 1960 Bing & Satchmo, Louis Armstrong/Bing Crosby
- 1961 Two of a Kind, Bobby Darin
- 1987 Louis Armstrong & All-Stars 1947–1950, Louis Armstrong
- 1987 Sing, Sing, Sing Benny Goodman
- 1988 The Complete Columbia Recordings (1949–1953), Sarah Vaughan
- 1989 I Gotta Right to Sing the Blues, Jack Teagarden
- 1989 Portrait of Bunny Berigan Bunny Berigan
- 1992 Easy Jazz, Paul Weston
- 1994 It's Magic, Doris Day
- 1994 Louis Prima Vol. 1, Louis Prima
- 1995 Bouncin' in Rhythm, Adrian Rollini
- 1996 The Mel Tormé Collection, Mel Tormé
- 1998 Memories of You, Rosemary Clooney
- 1998 Swing Era 1927–1947, Gene Krupa
- 1998 The Queen of Big Band Swing, Helen Ward
- 1999 Happy Holidays: I Love the Winter Weather, Jo Stafford
- 1999 Knockin' on Wood, Red Norvo
- 1999 Musical Marriage, Peggy Lee
- 2000 That Lucky Old Sun, Frankie Laine
- 2001 Mr. Silvertone, Freddy Martin
- 2002 The All–Stars at Bob Haggart's 80th Birthday Party, Bob Haggart
- 2003 Forty Years: The Artistry of Tony Bennett, Tony Bennett
- 2006 In Person 1925–1955, Hoagy Carmichael
- 2007 John Pisano's Guitar Night, John Pisano

== Bibliography ==
- Van Eps, George (1939). Method for Guitar. Epiphone. ASIN B004IHGA1Y.
- Van Eps, George (1993). Guitar Solos. Mel Bay Publications. ASIN B0013GHRKG.
- Van Eps, George (1980). Harmonic Mechanisms for Guitar, Volume One. Mel Bay Publications. ISBN 978-0871669063.
- Van Eps, George (1981). Harmonic Mechanisms for Guitar, Volume Two. Mel Bay Publications. ISBN 978-0786609246.
- Van Eps, George (1982). Harmonic Mechanisms for Guitar, Volume Three. Mel Bay Publications. ISBN 978-1562223663.
