= Frankly Sentimental =

Studio album by Frank Sinatra
- Released: June 20, 1949
- Recorded: July 30, 1946 – November 9, 1947 Hollywood New York City
- Genre: Traditional pop
- Label: Columbia

Frank Sinatra chronology
Christmas Songs by Sinatra (1948)	Frankly Sentimental (1949)	Dedicated to You (1950)

Frankly Sentimental is the fourth studio album by Frank Sinatra, released on June 20, 1949 as a set of four 78 rpm records and a 10" LP album. The tracks were arranged and conducted by Axel Stordahl and his orchestra. The album is composed of eight songs recorded in eight separate sessions in 1946 and 1947.

== Reception ==
John Riley wrote in The Boston Globe that Sinatra "sings in a lackluster fashion which fails to enliven the listener's interest even in a good song ... some of the songs, notably 'Body and Soul', Frankie literally wades through as though it were a demanding chore ... and in other songs, he sings in a quiet, simple way which increases, rather than diminishes the effectiveness of the song ... some are well done ... some are hardly worthy of notice". Harold Ober from the Asbury Park Press noted that "some of the tunes are well known show numbers, all are sentimental as the title implies, and all are sung in Sinatra's best style".

The Springfield Sunday Republican said "each of these numbers, familiar to all, might have been written expressly for the thin vocalist, they are so perfectly adapted to his style ... actually, that is the one minor fault ... one wishes, that there might be just one in definitely different tempo..., however, the album is an excellent one". George Mangus of The Miami Herald opined that "every so often the Columbia waxery comes out with an album that becomes scarce and valuable in a very short time ... we predict this album to be one of these collections".

== Track listing ==
1. "Body and Soul" (E. Heyman, R. Sour, F. Eyton, J. Green) – 3:19
2. "Laura" (David Raksin, Johnny Mercer) – 3:12
3. "Fools Rush In" (Mercer, Rube Bloom) – 3:04
4. "Spring Is Here" (Richard Rodgers, Lorenz Hart) – 2:43
5. "One For My Baby (And One More For The Road)" (Harold Arlen, Mercer)
6. "Guess I'll Hang My Tears Out to Dry" (Jule Styne, Sammy Cahn)
7. "When You Awake" (Henry Nemo)
8. "It Never Entered My Mind" (Rodgers, Hart) – 3:34

== Personnel ==
- Frank Sinatra – vocals
- Axel Stordahl – arranger, conductor
- Notable Los Angeles musicians – 1946 to 1947:
  - Heinie Beau
  - Clyde Hurley
  - Dave Barbour
- Notable New York musicians – 1947:
  - Ernie Caceres
  - Toots Mondello
  - Hymie Schertzer
  - Chris Griffin
  - Bobby Hackett
  - Johnny Guarnieri
  - Trigger Alpert
