= Songs by Sinatra =

Studio album by Frank Sinatra
- Released: April 21, 1947 (78 rpm release) January 2, 1950 (10" re-issue)
- Recorded: December 19, 1944 – January 9, 1947 Hollywood
- Genre: Traditional pop
- Label: Columbia

Frank Sinatra chronology
The Voice of Frank Sinatra (1946)	Songs by Sinatra (1947)	Christmas Songs by Sinatra (1948)

Songs by Sinatra is the second studio album by Frank Sinatra. The tracks were arranged and conducted by Axel Stordahl and his orchestra. It is a collection of eight recordings from six different sessions. It was originally released as a set of four 78 rpm records (set number C-124) similar to The Voice of Frank Sinatra and re-issued in 1950 as a 10" record (CL 6087).

== Track listing ==
1. "I'm Sorry I Made You Cry" (N.J. Clesi) – 3:04
2. "How Deep is the Ocean?" (Irving Berlin) – 2:58
3. "Over the Rainbow" (with the Ken Lane Singers) (Harold Arlen, E.Y. Harburg) – 3:16
4. "She's Funny That Way" (Neil Moret, Richard A. Whiting) – 3:23
5. "Embraceable You" (George Gershwin, Ira Gershwin) – 3:18
6. "All the Things You Are" (with the Ken Lane Singers) (Jerome Kern, Oscar Hammerstein II) – 3:03
7. "That Old Black Magic" (Harold Arlen, Johnny Mercer) – 2:34
8. "I Concentrate on You" (Cole Porter) – 3:04

== Personnel ==
- Frank Sinatra – Vocals
- Axel Stordahl – Arranger, Conductor
- Musicians – Victor Arno, Robert Barene, Alex Beller, Eddie Bergman, William Bloom, Harry Blostein, Harry Bluestone, Werner Callies, Sam Cytron, Walter Edelstein, Peter Ellis, Sam Freed, David Frisina, David Jefferson, Gerald Joyce, George Kast, Sol Kindler, Morris King, Samuel Levine, Sam Middleman, Fred Olson, Anthony Perrotti, Nick Pisani, Gene Powers, Ted Rosen, Mischa Russell, Felix Slatkin, Marshall Sosson, Oreste Tomasso, Olcott Vail (violins), Allan Harshman, William Hymanson, Paul Lowenkron, Alexander Neiman, Maurice Perlmutter, Paul Robyn, Leonard Selic, William Spear, Dave Sterkin, Gary White (violas), Cy Bernard, Fred Goerner, Arthur Kafton, Nicholas Ochi-Albi, John Sewell, Julius Tannenbaum (celli), May Cambern, Irma Clow (harps), Heinie Beau (alto saxophone/clarinet), Fred Dornbach (alto saxophone/clarinet), Manny Gershman (alto saxophone/clarinet/baritone saxophone), Leonard Hartman (tenor saxophone/clarinet/flute/bass clarinet), Herbie Haymer (tenor saxophone/clarinet), Jules Kinsler (tenor saxophone/flute/bass clarinet), Harold Lawson (tenor saxophone/clarinet), Don Logiudice (alto saxophone/clarinet), Harry Schuchman (alto saxophone/clarinet/oboe/baritone saxophone), Arthur Smith (alto saxophone/clarinet), Willie Smith (alto saxophone/clarinet/soprano saxophone), Fred Stulce (alto saxophone/clarinet/flute/baritone saxophone), Don Anderson, Charles Griffard, Max Herman, Ray Linn, Leonard Mach, Billy May, Horace Nelson, Rubin "Zeke" Zarchey (trumpets), Hoyt Bohannon, Dave Hallett, George Jenkins, Carl Loeffler, Pullman "Tommy" Pederson, Jack Schaeffer, Jimmy Skiles, Elmer Smithers, Paul Weigand, Joe Yukl (trombones), Fred Fox, Richard Perissi, James Stagliano (French horns), Mark McIntyre (piano/celeste), Dave Barbour, Allan Reuss (guitars), John Ryan, Artie Shapiro, Phil Stephens (bass), Ray Hagan (drums)
