= Victor Arden =

American pianist (1893–1962)

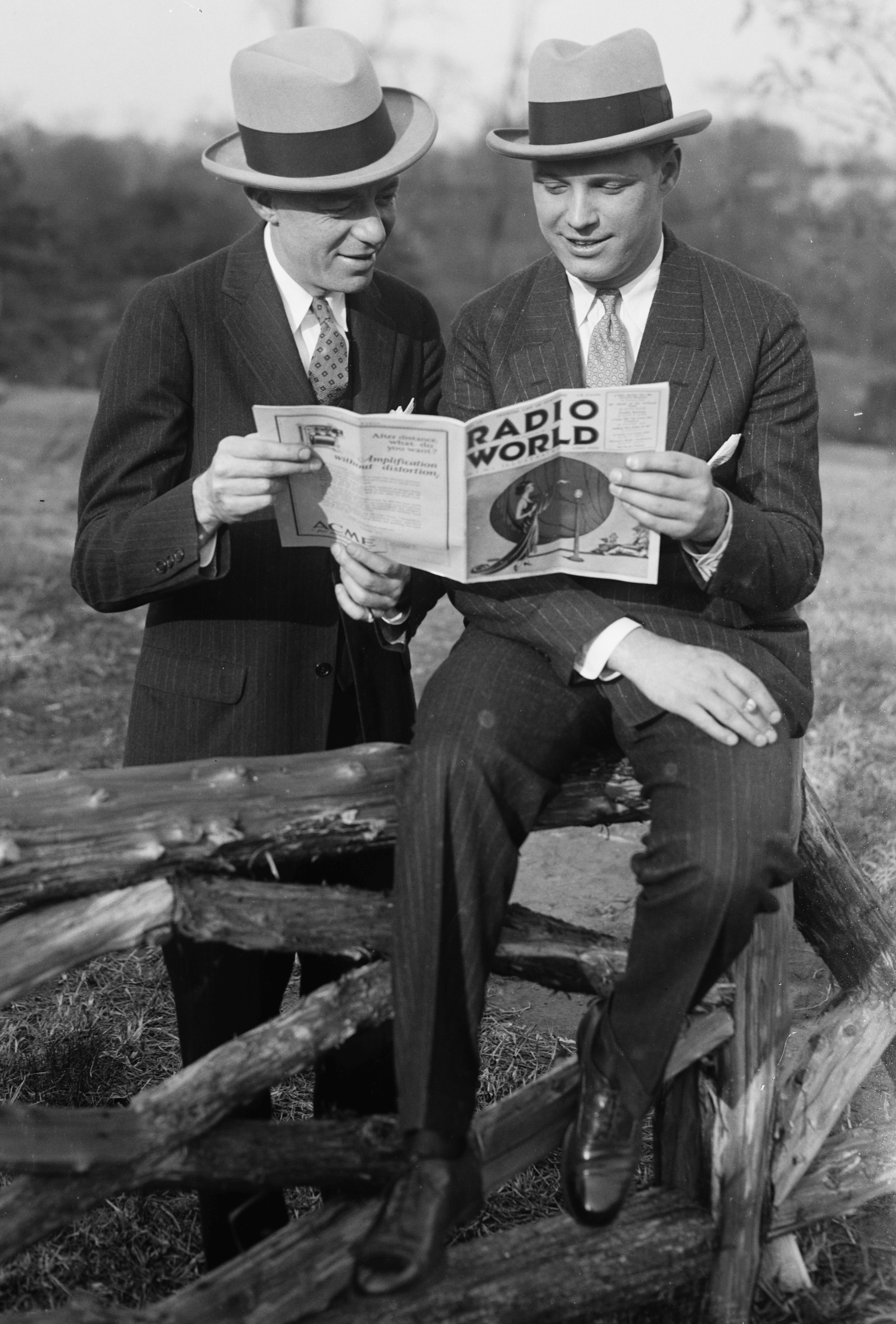
- Victor Arden and Phil Ohman
- Born: Lewis John Fuiks; March 8, 1893; Wenonah, Illinois, U.S.
- Died: July 31, 1962 (aged 69); New York City, U.S.
- Occupation: Pianist

Victor Arden was the stage name of American pianist Lewis John Fuiks (8 March 1893 – 31 July 1962) who was best known as the piano duo partner of and co-orchestra leader with Phil Ohman from 1922 to 1932. He was the pianist in the All-Star Trio, who made several hits for Victor Records between 1919 and 1921.

== Early years ==
Arden was born March 8, 1893, in Wenona, Illinois.

== Radio ==
In 1935, Arden was described in a newspaper article as "well-known to music lovers and radio listeners." At the time, Arden's orchestra was featured on Musical Moments, which was carried on over 300 stations weekly. Arden and his orchestra also provided the music for Mr. Chameleon, a detective fiction radio drama that ran on CBS Radio from the late 1940s to the early 1950s.

== Recording ==
Before 1920, Arden was making piano rolls to be reproduced on player pianos manufactured by the American Piano Company. He also cut numerous rolls for QRS. Watch a video of Maybe It's Love Ampico Recording # 213191 played on a 1926 Mason & Hamlin RBB, 6' 11.5" Ampico A with a retro fit B drawer.

== Death ==
Arden died July 31, 1962, in New York City.

== Selected compositions ==
1909

- Safety Pin Catch

1918

- Just Blue, also by Frank Wheeler Wadsworth (1889–1929)

1919

- In My Dreams
- Lucille, also by Frank Wheeler Wadsworth (1889–1929)
- Marilynn, also by Frank Wheeler Wadsworth (1889–1929)
- Honeymoon Waltz, words by Ray Sherwood (born 1895), music by Victor Arden

1920

- Hy n' Dry
- Rose of the Orient, also by Frank Wheeler Wadsworth (1889–1929) & George Hamilton Green
- Dolly, I Love You, also by Frank Wheeler Wadsworth (1889–1929) & Dick Long
- Molly, also by Frank Wheeler Wadsworth (1889–1929) & Dick Long
- Who Wants a Baby?, also by George Hamilton Green
- Dottie Dimples, also by George Hamilton Green
- In Blossom Time, also by Louis Weslyn (pseudonym for Weslyn Jones) (1884–1937)

1921

- 'Round the Town
- Hand Painted Doll, also by George Hamilton Green
- Lonesome Land, also by George Hamilton Green

1922

- After A While (You're Goin' to Feel Blue), also by George Hamilton Green & Walter Hirsch (1891–1967)
- My Sweet Gal, also by George Hamilton Green
- I'm Happy: Fox Trot, also by George Hamilton Green

1930

- Dancing the Devil Away

1941

- Hearts in Harmony
- We'd Rather Die Upon Our Feet Than Live Upon Our Knees, words by Henry A. Murphy, melody by Joseph Russel Robinson (1892–1963) & Victor Arden
- Unity, words by Henry A. Murphy, melody by Joseph Russel Robinson (1892–1963) & Victor Arden
- Let's Incorporate, also by Lawrence M. Klee (died 1957)

== Education ==
Arden was a graduate of the University of Chicago and studied at the American Conservatory of Music in Chicago.

== Family ==
Arden was married twice. He first married Ilse Alma Spindler (born April 1894) – a 1916 graduate of the University of Chicago – in Chicago, on May 2, 1917. The couple had two sons: Robert Spindler Fuiks (1921–2009) and Lewis John Fuiks Jr. (1919–2004). Arden remarried in the 1950s to Frances Newsom, a classical soprano.
