= The Very Best of Frank Sinatra =

Compilation album by Frank Sinatra
- Released: June 10, 1997
- Recorded: December 19, 1960 – September 19, 1979
- Genres: Jazz, vocal jazz, traditional pop
- Length: 125:17
- Label: Reprise
- Producer: Gregg Geller

Frank Sinatra chronology
With the Red Norvo Quintet: Live in Australia, 1959 (1997)	The Very Best of Frank Sinatra (1997)	Portrait of Sinatra: Columbia Classics (1997)

Professional ratings
Review scores
Source	Rating
AllMusic	5/5 stars

The Very Best of Frank Sinatra is a double disc compilation album by the American singer Frank Sinatra that consists of 40 hits he made from Reprise Records.

== Track listing ==
=== Disc one ===
1. "Stardust" (Hoagy Carmichael, Mitchell Parish) – 2:48
2. "A Foggy Day" (George Gershwin, Ira Gershwin) – 2:17
3. "Let's Fall in Love" (Harold Arlen, Ted Koehler) – 2:11
4. "The Girl Next Door" (Hugh Martin, Ralph Blane) – 3:18
5. "Old Devil Moon" (Burton Lane, E.Y. Harburg) – 2:57
6. "The Way You Look Tonight" (Dorothy Fields, Jerome Kern) – 3:22
7. "Fly Me to the Moon (In Other Words)" (Bart Howard) – 2:30
8. "Nice Work If You Can Get It" (G. Gershwin, I. Gershwin) – 2:36
9. "I Get a Kick Out of You" (Cole Porter) – 3:15
10. "Come Rain or Come Shine" (Arlen, Johnny Mercer) – 4:07
11. "Please Be Kind" (Saul Chaplin, Sammy Cahn) – 2:42
12. "Don'cha Go 'Way Mad" (Jimmy Mundy, Al Stillman, Illinois Jacquet) – 3:13
13. "They Can't Take That Away from Me" (G. Gershwin, I. Gershwin) – 2:41
14. "In the Wee Small Hours of the Morning" (David Mann, Bob Hilliard) – 2:43
15. "I've Got You Under My Skin" (Porter) – 3:32
16. "Let's Face the Music and Dance" (Irving Berlin) – 2:59
17. "Come Fly with Me" (Cahn, Jimmy Van Heusen) – 3:11
18. "My Kind of Town" (Cahn, Van Heusen) – 3:09
19. "Luck Be a Lady" (Frank Loesser) – 5:14
20. "The Best Is Yet to Come" (Cy Coleman, Carolyn Leigh) – 2:54

=== Disc two ===
1. "It Was a Very Good Year" (Ervin Drake) – 4:25
2. "All or Nothing at All" (Jack Lawrence, Arthur Altman) – 3:43
3. "Night and Day" (Porter) – 3:37
4. "Nancy (With the Laughing Face)" (Phil Silvers, Van Heusen) – 3:37
5. "Young at Heart" (Leigh, Johnny Richards) – 2:54
6. "Love and Marriage" (Cahn, Van Heusen) – 2:12
7. "All the Way" (Cahn, Van Heusen) – 3:27
8. "Witchcraft" (Coleman, Leigh) – 2:37
9. "(Love Is) The Tender Trap" (Cahn, Van Heusen) – 2:37
10. "The Second Time Around" (Cahn, Van Heusen) – 3:03
11. "Pocketful of Miracles" (Cahn, Van Heusen) – 2:39
12. "Softly, as I Leave You" (Hal Shaper, Antonio DeVito, Giorgio Calabrese) – 2:50
13. "Strangers in the Night" (Bert Kaempfert, Charles Singleton (songwriter), Eddie Snyder) – 2:25
14. "Summer Wind" (Heinz Meier, Hans Bradtke, Mercer) – 2:53
15. "That's Life" (Kelly Gordon, Dean Kay) – 3:10
16. "Somethin' Stupid" [with Nancy Sinatra] (Carson Parks) – 2:45
17. "Wave" (Antonio Carlos Jobim) – 3:25
18. "My Way" (Paul Anka, Claude Francois, Jacques Revaux, Gilles Thibaut) – 4:36
19. "Theme from New York, New York" (Fred Ebb, John Kander) – 3:26
20. "Put Your Dreams Away (For Another Day)" (Paul Mann, George David Weiss, Ruth Lowe) – 3:12

== Personnel ==
- Frank Sinatra – vocals
- Nancy Sinatra – vocals
- Antonio Carlos Jobim – guitar
- Nelson Riddle – arranger, conductor
- Don Costa
- Gordon Jenkins
- Billy May
- Johnny Mandell
- Ernie Freeman
- Billy Strange
- Eumir Deodato
- Neal Hefti
- Count Basie and his orchestra
