= Bill Clifton (pianist) =

Canadian jazz pianist

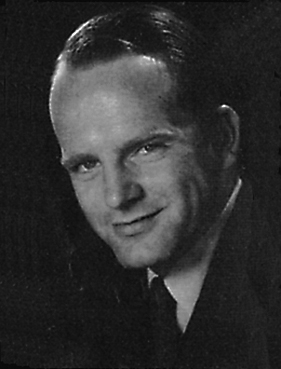

Background information
- Birth name: Bill Clifton
- Born: July 6, 1916; Toronto, Ontario, Canada
- Died: February 26, 1967 (aged 50) at sea aboard the S.S. Argentina
- Genres: Popular music, Jazz
- Occupation: Musician
- Instrument: Piano
- Years active: 1937–1967

Bill Clifton (July 6, 1916 – February 26, 1967) was a Canadian jazz pianist based in New York City for almost three decades. He played with many of the name bands of the swing era and accompanied some of the music industry's most noted vocalists He is remembered today as an early and important influence on the great jazz pianist Bill Evans.

== Career ==
Clifton was born in Toronto, Ontario. He began his piano studies at age seven with Toronto's Royal Conservatory Of Music. Bill was introduced to the music of Fletcher Henderson and Duke Ellington in his high school years and began to ponder a career as a professional musician. After graduating, he became the pianist in The Cliff McKay Band, a Canadian group that played a few "hot" arrangements amongst its stylistically broad program. Bill Clifton entered New York City in 1939, finding immediate employment with The Paul Whiteman Orchestra. Stints with: Benny Goodman, Woody Herman, Ray Noble, Bud Freeman, Abe Lyman and others followed. Bill also performed and (or) recorded with some of the most beloved voices in American music history including: Bing Crosby, Frank Sinatra, Cliff "Ukulele Ike" Edwards (the voice of Disney's Jiminy Cricket) and Ilene Woods (the voice of Disney's Cinderella).

He made many appearances on radio and television during his employment as a studio musician for several years at both the NBC and CBS networks. He was a regular guest on the "Piano Playhouse" radio program during its lengthy run on NBC from the late 1940s to early 1950s. This was a popular weekly broadcast with an international audience that featured the most important pianist in the jazz and classical fields. His work in television included membership in the Tony Mottola Trio. This combo pioneered live music accompaniment for early television and was led by the brilliant guitarist, Tony Mottola. Bill Clifton also appeared in a number of films including "The Laugh Maker" (1953). starring Jackie Gleason and Art Carney. For several years, beginning in the late 1940s, Clifton alternated solo shows with the great pianist, Cy Walter (the Park Avenue Art Tatum) at New York's famed Drake Room. This elegant night spot housed in The Drake Hotel was a nexus at the time for some of the biggest names in the entertainment world.

In 1950, Bill Clifton recorded one of the earliest long-playing records as part of the Columbia Records "Piano Moods" series. Later work included an album featuring Clifton's talents as an arranger and conductor as well as pianist for the Ilene Woods LP "It's Late".

Clifton died while performing aboard the S.S. Argentina.

== Selected discography ==
- Paul Whiteman Orchestra "Album Of Manhattan" Decca Records (1940)
- Various Artists "Midnight At V-Disc" Pumpkin Productions (1944)
- Frank Sinatra "The Voice Of Frank Sinatra" Columbia Records (1946)
- Jerry Jerome "Something Old, Something New" and "Something Borrowed, Something Blue" Arbors Jazz Records (mid 1940s - late 1940s)
- Bill Clifton "Piano Moods" Columbia Records (1950)
- Ilene Woods "It's Late" Jubilee Records (1957)
- Bill Clifton "Red Shadows: The Keystone Solo Piano Transcriptions c. 1947" Cliftone Records (released May, 2014)
