= Phil Ohman =

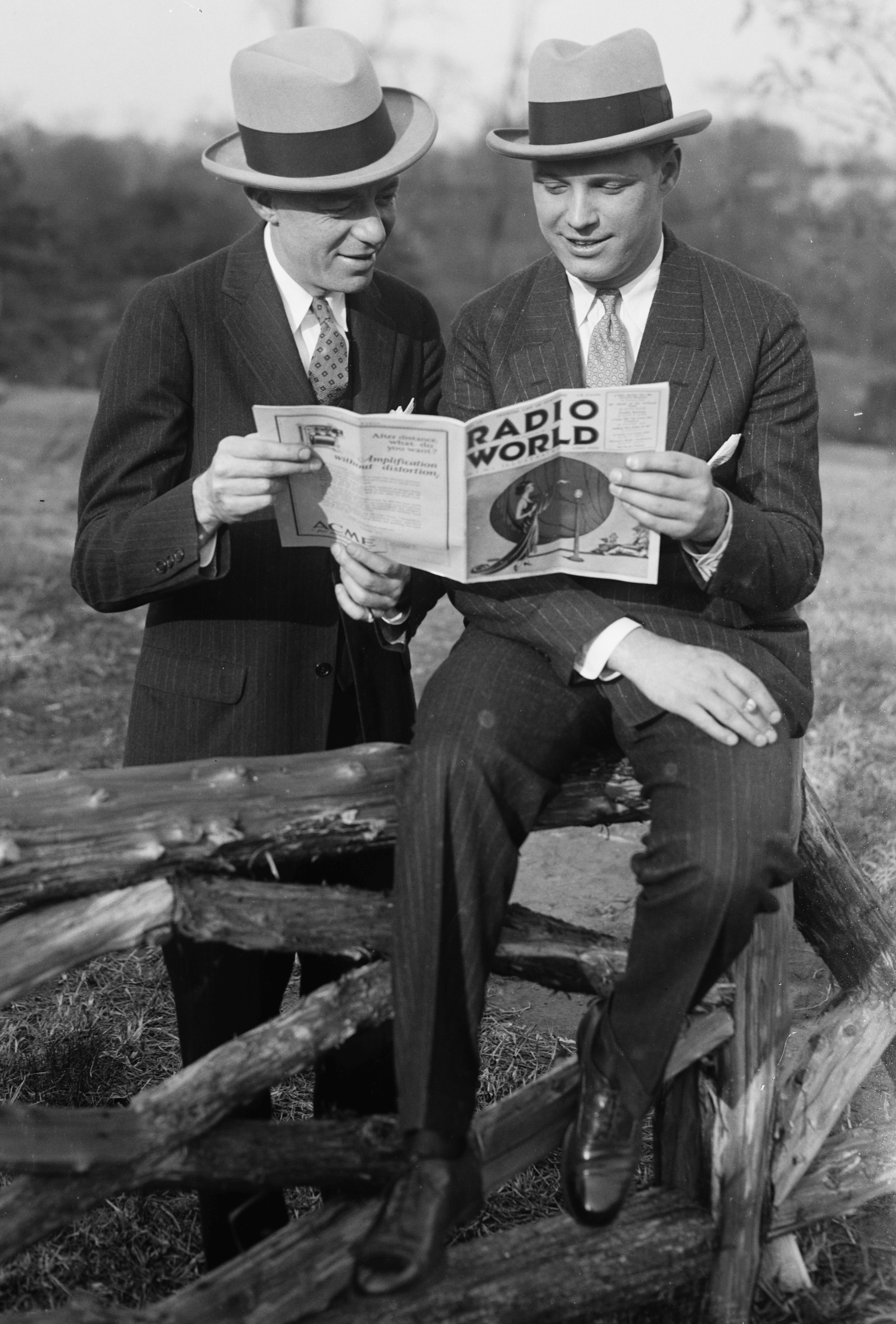
- Victor Arden and Phil Ohman

Background information
- Born: October 7, 1896; New Britain, Connecticut, U.S.
- Died: August 8, 1954 (aged 57) Santa Monica, California, U.S.
- Genres: Ragtime, Film scores
- Occupation: Composer
- Instrument: Piano

Phil Ohman (October 7, 1896 – August 8, 1954) was an American film composer and pianist. He is most well known for his collaboration with fellow musician Victor Arden in the 1920s and 1930s.

== Biography ==
Ohman was born Fillmore Wellington Ohman in New Britain, Connecticut in 1896. He is remembered as being one half of one of the pre-eminent piano duos in the 1922-1932, paired with Victor Arden. They were the pit pianists in many of George Gershwin's musicals, and recorded hundreds of piano rolls and records. Starting in mid 1927, just as they signed to Victor Records, they developed a large studio orchestra specializing in Broadway show songs that became quite popular. These particular records employed a rather large, brassy powerful sound (it is not known who they used as arranger), always with a space for a twin piano duet section.

Ohman died in Santa Monica, California on August 8, 1954.

== Partial filmography ==
- Try and Play It (1922)
- Up and Down the Keys (1922)
- Piano Pan (1922)
- Sparkles (1935)
- The Renegade Trail (1939)
- Captain Caution (1940)
- The Roundup (1941)
- Sweethearts of the U.S.A. (1944)
- Dick Tracy vs. Cueball (1946)
- Million Dollar Weekend (1948)

== See also ==
- List of ragtime composers
