= Home on the Range =

American folk song

Song
- Genre: Western; folk
- Composer: Daniel E. Kelley
- Lyricist: Brewster M. Higley

Home on the Range
- Regional anthem of Kansas
- Lyrics: Brewster M. Higley
- Music: Daniel E. Kelley
- Published: before 1874
- Adopted: June 30, 1947; 79 years ago

Home on the Range
- Fight song anthem of The University of Kansas
- Lyrics: Brewster M. Higley
- Music: Daniel E. Kelley
- Published: before 1874
- Adopted: March 21, 1950; 76 years ago

"Home on the Range" (Roud No. 3599) is an American folk song, sometimes called the "unofficial anthem" of the American West. Dr. Brewster M. Higley (also spelled Highley) of Smith County, Kansas, wrote the lyrics as the poem "My Western Home" in 1872 or 1873, with at least one source indicating it was written as early as 1871.

On June 30, 1947, "Home on the Range" became the Kansas state song. In 2010, members of the Western Writers of America chose it as one of the Top 100 western songs of all time.

A rendition of the song is one of the seven fight songs of the University of Kansas, and is traditionally played by the Marching Jayhawks university band at the end of every home athletic event.

== History ==
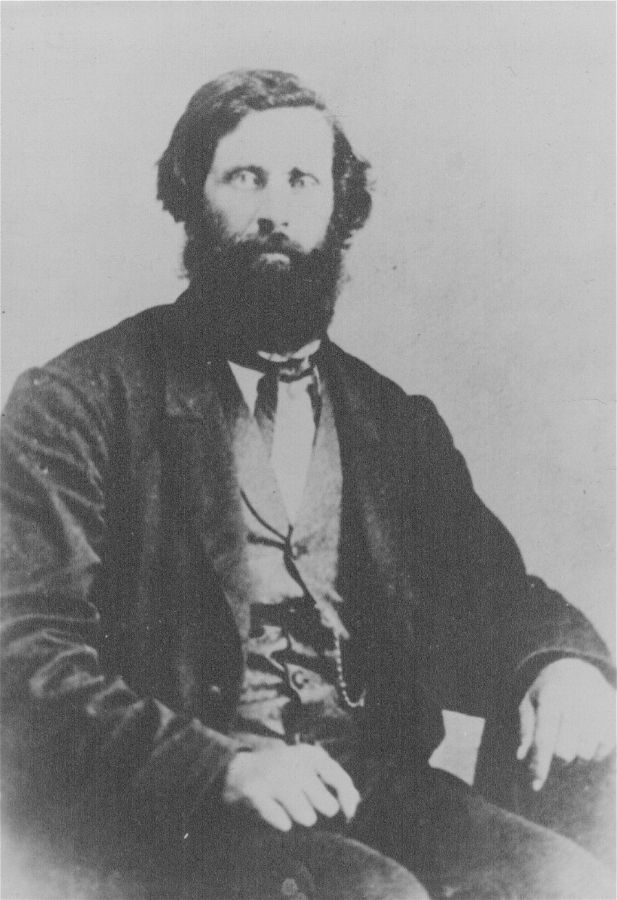
Dr. Brewster M. Higley, late 19th century

In 1871, Higley moved from Indiana and acquired land in Smith County, Kansas under the Homestead Act, living in a small cabin near West Beaver Creek. Higley was inspired by his surroundings and wrote "My Western Home", which was published in the Smith County Pioneer (KS) newspaper in 1873 or 1874 and republished March 21, 1874 in The Kirwin Chief. Higley's cabin home is now listed on the National Register of Historic Places as the Home on the Range Cabin.

Daniel E. Kelley (1843–1905), a friend of Higley and member of the Harlan Brothers Orchestra, developed a melody for the song on his guitar. Higley's original lyrics are similar to those of the modern version of the song, but not identical. For instance, the original poem did not contain the words "on the range". Ranchers, cowboys, and other western settlers adopted the song as a rural anthem and it spread throughout the United States in various forms. In 1925, Texas composer David W. Guion (1892–1981) arranged it as sheet music that was published by G. Schirmer. The song has since gone by a number of names, the most common being "Home on the Range" and "Western Home". It was officially adopted as the state song of Kansas on June 30, 1947, and is commonly regarded as the unofficial anthem of the American West.

On September 27, 1933, Bing Crosby recorded "Home on the Range" with Lennie Hayton and his orchestra for Brunswick Records. At the time, the origins of "Home on the Range" were obscure and widely debated, although it had been published in 1910 in folklorist John Lomax's Cowboy Songs and Other Frontier Ballads. Lomax reported that he had learned the song from a black saloon keeper in Texas who recalled learning it on the Chisholm Trail. Its popularity led to William and Mary Goodwin filing a suit for copyright infringement in 1934 for $500,000. In 1905, the couple had published "An Arizona Home", similar to "Home on the Range". The lawsuit initiated a search for the song's background.

As it turned out, controversy and even outright plagiarism have followed the song's lyrics since their publication. On Feb. 26, 1876, the Kirwin Chief published an article on the front page titled, "PLAGIARISM," accusing The Stockton News of publishing a nearly identical poem credited to a Mrs. Emma Race of Raceburgh, KS. The Kirwin Chief, which had published the poem Mar. 26, 1874, reprinted the poem below the article. When Samuel Moanfeldt investigated the history of "Home on the Range" on behalf of the Music Publishers Protection Association in response to the Goodwins' 1934 lawsuit, he found another, similar song, "Colorado Home". However, within a few months, Moanfeldt determined Higley had written the poem behind "Home on the Range", and set to music by Kelley. It seemed likely that cowboys on the Chisholm Trail played a role in making the song known throughout several states.

== Modern usage ==
Bing Crosby recorded the song again in 1938 and 1939. Frank Sinatra also recorded the song on March 10, 1946, and his version was released in Great Britain but was not available in the United States until 1993. Others who have recorded the song include John Charles Thomas, Connie Francis, Gene Autry, Boxcar Willie, Burl Ives, Pete Seeger, Johnnie Ray, Slim Whitman, Steve Lawrence and Tori Amos. "Home on the Range" is often performed in programs and concerts of American patriotic music and is frequently used in plays and films. The song is also the theme opening music for the early Western films starring Ray "Crash" Corrigan and his two co-stars in their movie roles as "The Three Mesqueteers".

The song’s most famous use is probably as the theme to the 1950s TV series, The Range Rider. It is also featured in the 1937 screwball comedy The Awful Truth (sung by Irene Dunne and Ralph Bellamy), the 1948 film Mr. Blandings Builds His Dream House (sung by both Cary Grant and Myrna Loy), the 1967 off-Broadway musical You're a Good Man, Charlie Brown (sung by the cast as a glee club rehearsal number), the 1980 film Where the Buffalo Roam (sung by Neil Young over the opening credits), the 2009 film The Messenger (sung by Willie Nelson over the closing credits), and the 1946 western film Colorado Serenade (sung by actor Roscoe Ates). Actor Harry Dean Stanton (as the angel "Gideon") sings an excerpt from his mid-tree perch in the 1985 film One Magic Christmas as well as in the 1988 David Lynch short film, The Cowboy and the Frenchman. A parody version is sung by villainous poacher Percival McLeach in the 1990 animated film The Rescuers Down Under, where he alters the lyrics to describe his skinning of animals.

The song has made its way into screen shorts for children and adults, as in the 1954 Looney Tunes cartoon Claws for Alarm, where it is sung by Porky Pig. Likewise, Bugs Bunny sings the song in both The Fair-Haired Hare (1951) and Oily Hare (1952), the latter containing original lyrics specific to Texas oilmen.

The song is used in The Simpsons episode "Lisa's Substitute" (1991) in which Lisa is inspired by a substitute teacher who dresses as a cowboy and sings the song with commentary. It was also used on the Shining Time Station episode "A Dog's Life."

It made an appearance on GLOW when Debbie Eagan (played by Betty Gilpin) sang a portion in the fourth episode of the second season.

Vikingarna recorded an instrumental version of the song on the 1981 album Kramgoa låtar 9, entitled "Home on the Ranch".

An instrumental version of the song was used in the 2011 video game, Rage.

In 2016, the American progressive rock band Kansas released a version of the song as a bonus track on their album The Prelude Implicit.

In 2017, a docudrama was released that told the story of the song's origins and the lawsuit from the 1930s that finally concluded the authorship of the song. The film was produced by the People's Heartland Foundation and Lone Chimney Films and featured actors Buck Taylor, Rance Howard, Darby Hinton, and the voice of the Kansas City Chiefs, Mitch Holthus. The film also included music contributed by Kansas, Sons of the Pioneers, Michael Martin Murphey, and others. The film was directed by Ken Spurgeon and aired on regional PBS stations.

In 2020, the American show Better Call Saul referenced the song when Kevin Wachtell, played by Rex Linn depicted the western lifestyle behind his father's bank, Mesa Verde

In 2024, Filipino actor Derrick Monasterio released a version of the song as a track on their album Pulang Araw: Official Soundtrack.

== Major versions compared ==
Home on the Range
A recording of the song from Raiford Penitentiary, Florida, 1939.

See Mecham (1949) for a discussion of differences in lyrics amongst sources as well as definitions of terms.

"Oh, Give Me a Home on The Range"

Poem by Dr. Brewster Higley

Smith County Pioneer, 1873 / 1914

Levi Moris (Note: Pletcher (1960), claimed to reprint the poem "Home on the Range" as it appeared in an 1873 edition of the Smith County Pioneer and provided the Pioneer's editor's name; no source was given for either. Also, Pletcher gave the editor's name as Levi Morris (p. 230) but noted the Pioneer's owner's name was Levi Morrell (p. 106), also spelling the name Morrill (p. 47). Could Morris and Morrell/Morrill have been the same person?) / W. H. Nelson, Editors

(No copies of the 1873 article exist; only the 1914 reprint remains.)

Oh, give me a home where the buffalo roam,
Where the deer and antelope play,
Where never is heard a discouraging word
And the sky is not clouded all day.
Chorus—
A home, a home where the deer and the antelope play,
Where never is heard a discouraging word
And the sky is not clouded all day.

Oh, give me the gale of the Solomon vale,
Where light streams with buoyancy flow,
On the banks of the Beaver, where seldom if ever,
Any poisonous herbage doth grow.
Chorus—
Oh, give me the land where the bright diamond sand
Throws light from its glittering stream,
Where glideth along the graceful white swan
Like a maid in her heavenly dream
Chorus—
I love these wild flowers in this bright land of ours,
I love, too, the curlew's wild scream,
The bluffs of white rocks and antelope flocks
That graze on our hillsides so green.
Chorus—
How often at night, when the heavens are bright
By the light of the glittering stars,
Have I stood there amazed and asked as I gazed
If their beauty exceeds this of ours.
Chorus—
The air is so pure the breezes so light,
The zephyrs so balmy at night,
I would not exchange my home here to range
Forever in azure so bright.
Chorus—

"Western Home"

Poem by Dr Higley

The Kirwin Chief, 1874 / 1876

W. D. Jenkins, Editor

(No copies of the 1874 article exist; only the 1876 reprint remains.)

Oh! give me a home where the Buffalo roam,
Where the Deer and the Antelope play;
Where never is heard a discouraging word,
And the sky is not clouded all day.
[Chorus] A home! A home!
Where the Deer and the Antelope play,
Where seldom is heard a discouraging word,
And the sky is not clouded all day

Oh! give me land where the bright diamond sand.
Throws its light from the glittering streams,
Where glideth along the graceful white swan,
Like the maid in her heavenly dreams.
[Chorus] A home! A home!

Oh! give me a gale of the Solomon vale,
Where the life streams with buoyancy flow;
Or the banks of the Beaver, where seldom if ever,
Any poisonous herbage doth grow.
[Chorus] A home! A home!

How often at night, when the heavens were bright,
With the light of the twinkling stars,
Have I stood here amazed, and asked as I gazed,
If their glory exceed that of ours.
[Chorus] A home! A home!

I love the wild flowers in this bright land of ours,
I love the wild curlew's shrill scream;
The bluffs and white rocks, and antelope flocks,
That graze on the mountains so green.
[Chorus] A home! A home!

The air is so pure and the breezes so free,
The zephyrs so balmy and light,
That I would not exchange my home here to range,
Forever in azures so bright.
[Chorus] A home! A home!

"A Home on the Range"

Cowboy Songs and Other Frontier Ballads

John A. Lomax, ed., 1910

(Lyrics as printed, pp. 39–40. Sheet music, pp. 41–43, includes first verse and "refrain".

Oh, give me a home where the buffalo roam,
Where the deer and the antelope play,
Where seldom is heard a discouraging word
And the skies are not cloudy all day.

Home, home on the range,
Where the deer and the antelope play;
Where seldom is heard a discouraging word
And the skies are not cloudy all day.

Where the air is so pure, the zephyrs so free,
The breezes so balmy and light,
That I would not exchange my home on the range
For all of the cities so bright.

The red man was pressed from this part of the West,
He's likely no more to return
To the banks of Red River where seldom if ever
Their flickering camp-fires burn.

How often at night when the heavens are bright
With the light from the glittering stars,
Have I stood here amazed and asked as I gazed
If their glory exceeds that of ours.

Oh, I love these wild flowers in this dear land of ours,
The curlew I love to hear scream,
And I love the white rocks and the antelope flocks
That graze on the mountain-tops green.

Oh, give me a land where the bright diamond sand
Flows leisurely down the stream;
Where the graceful white swan goes gliding along
Like a maid in a heavenly dream.

Then I would not exchange my home on the range,
Where the deer and the antelope play;
Where seldom is heard a discouraging word
And the skies are not cloudy all day.

Home, home on the range,
Where the deer and the antelope play;
Where seldom is heard a discouraging word
And the skies are not cloudy all day.

== In popular culture ==
The first and sixth verses of John A. Lomax's 1910 version, "A Home on the Range", are heard in the "Glee Club Rehearsal" sequence of the Broadway musical You're a Good Man, Charlie Brown.

The well-known first verse and chorus are covered in a season four episode of Wizards of Waverly Place. The first verse was also covered in an episode of another Disney Channel sitcom, Good Luck Charlie, at the end of the episode "The Break Up".

An arrangement of the song is included in most Casio electronic keyboards.

In The Wacky World of Tex Avery, an animated series only very loosely connected to the famous cartoonist Fred "Tex" Avery, an instrumental version is used as the theme to the segment featuring an animated cowboy character also named "Tex Avery".

At the end of a fourth season episode of Cheers, in order to repair their friendship, Sam tells Woody that, after a big fight between him and Coach, the latter would make them put their arms around each other and sing "Home, Home on the Range" for half an hour. They sing the first verse and chorus in Sam's office. The patrons in the rest of the bar hear them clearly and join in at the end of the chorus.
