= Brewster Higley =

American otolaryngologist and poet

Brewster Higley VI
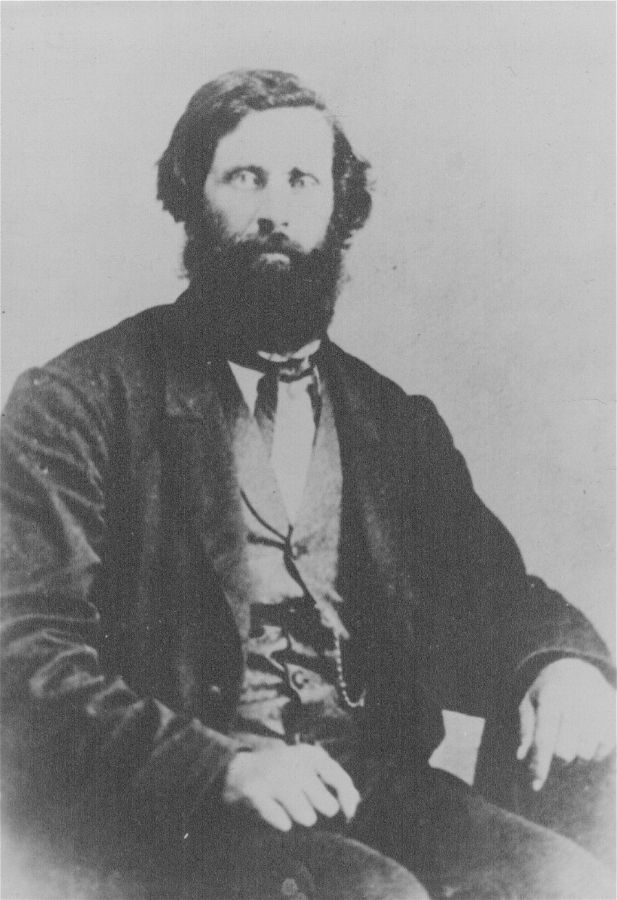
- Dr. Brewster M. Higley, late 19th century
- Born: November 30, 1823; Rutland, Ohio, US
- Died: December 9, 1911 (aged 88); Shawnee, Oklahoma, US
- Occupation: Otolaryngologist
- Known for: Wrote the lyrics for "Home on the Range"

Brewster Martin Higley VI (November 30, 1823 – December 9, 1911) was an otolaryngologist who became famous for writing "My Western Home". Originally written in 1871 or 1872 and published under the title "My Western Home" in the Smith County Pioneer in the fall of 1873, possibly December, this poem later became the original lyrics for the famous American folk song "Home on the Range".

Because Higley wrote "Home on the Range" while living in Smith County, Kansas, and because Kansans felt it described their state very well, the Kansas legislature voted to make "Home on the Range" the official state song on April 8, 1947.

== Early life and medical career ==
Born in Rutland, Ohio, the grandson of Rutland's founder Brewster Higley IV, Higley VI began studying medicine at La Porte Medical College in La Porte, Indiana at the age of eighteen. After graduating in 1849, he resettled in Pomeroy, Ohio and established his first medical practice. He briefly practiced medicine in Indiana and finally moved to Kansas in 1871 to claim land under the Homestead Act of 1862.

== Family and later life ==
Dr. Higley married five times and fathered several children. His first three marriages are reported to have ended tragically when his wives succumbed to injury or disease, but there is some dispute whether this was the case with his second wife. Following the dissolution of his first three marriages, Brewster married Mrs. Mercy Ann McPherson, a widow, on February 28, 1866. The two had a tumultuous relationship, and Dr. Higley felt compelled to leave his children with relatives in Illinois and secretly move away. He found his way to Smith County in 1871 and his marriage to Mrs. McPherson dissolved by default on February 9, 1875. One month later, on March 8, 1875, he married Sarah Clemons, his final wife.

=== Spouses and children ===
1. Maria Winchell Higley (wife), died in 1852 from disease
2. Eleanor Page Higley (wife), mother of Brewster Higley VII (son). It was reported that she died soon after the birth of their son. However, it was also reported that Eleanor may have taken their child and left Dr. Higley to live with her previous husband, David A. Smith. She likely died between 1853 and 1870.
3. Catherine Livingston Higley (wife), mother of Estella (daughter) and Arthur Herman (son), injured in 1864 and died subsequently.
4. Mrs. Mercy Ann McPherson (wife); Higley quite literally ran from the tumultuous marriage in 1871 to move to Kansas.
5. Sarah Clemons (wife).

Brewster spent most of his remaining days in Kansas, but died in Shawnee, Oklahoma in 1911, where he is buried in Fairview Cemetery.
