= George Hamilton Green =

American composer and xylophonist (1893–1970)

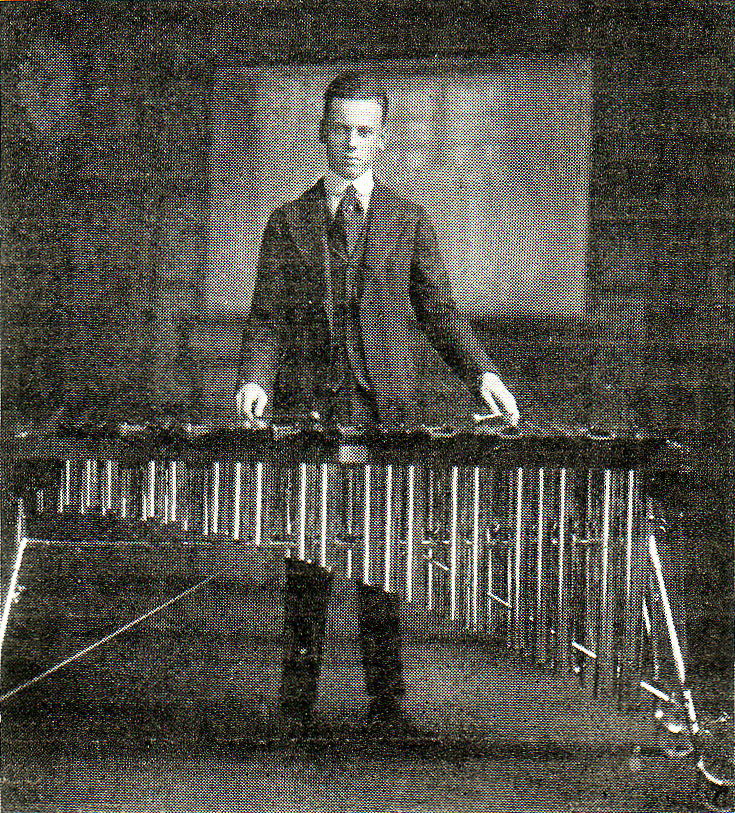
George Hamilton Green with xylophone, c. 1918.

George Hamilton Green Jr. (May 23, 1893 – September 11, 1970) was a xylophonist, composer, and cartoonist born in Omaha, Nebraska. He was born into a musical family, both his grandfather and his father being composers, arrangers, and conductors for bands in Omaha. His father was the conductor of an army band and growing up in his house, he had access to many musical instruments. From age four G.H. Green showed a prodigious talent as a pianist; he then took up the xylophone and by the age of eleven was being promoted as the “world’s greatest xylophonist” and was playing for crowds of 7,000-10,000. In 1915, when Green was 22 years old, a review in the United States Musician stated: "He has begun where every other xylophone player left off. His touch, his attack, his technique, and his powers of interpretation in the rendition of his solos being far different than other performers. To say his work is marvelous and wonderful would not fully express it." George Hamilton Green wrote several pieces for solo ragtime xylophone with accompaniment, as well as a xylophone method book which continues to be used by percussion pedagogues across the country. Some of his compositions for xylophone include: "Ragtime Robin", "Cross Corners", "Charleston Capers", "Rainbow Ripples", "Log Cabin Blues", "The Whistler", "Chromatic Fox Trot", and "Jovial Jasper" for piano and xylophone because of his experience on both instruments.

He was a popular recording artist starting in 1916 with the Edison Company and was employed, along with his two brothers, Joe and Lew Green, as the original sound music crew for Walt Disney's first three cartoons.

According to Nathaniel Shilkret, Green was not only a "wonderful xylophone artist," but an inventor. Shilkret said that Green designed the vibraharp at Shilkret's request.

Green was an important ragtime composer and authored many pieces that remain standards for the instrument even today. He retired from performing in the late 1940s to pursue a successful career in cartooning. Green would die in 1970, just a few years before a revival in the popularity of his ragtime xylophone music, and before his induction into the Percussive Arts Society Hall of Fame in 1983 The rebirth of his music was led by members of the NEXUS Percussion Ensemble in the late 1970s. Through their efforts, G.H. Green's xylophone music has been preserved and remains a relevant part of contemporary percussion pedagogy and performance.

== See also ==
- Music in Omaha, Nebraska
- Xylophone
- NEXUS
