= It All Depends on You =

"It All Depends on You" is a 1926 popular song with music by Ray Henderson and lyrics by Buddy G. DeSylva and Lew Brown. The song, written for the musical Big Boy, was published in 1926. It was featured in the hit 1928 Warner Bros. film The Singing Fool, starring Al Jolson, Betty Bronson and Josephine Dunn, and directed by Lloyd Bacon.

== Recorded versions ==
- Shirley Bassey
- Ben Bernie and his Orchestra (vocal: Lambert & Hillpot) (1927)
- Arthur Briggs' Savoy Syncopators (vocal: Al Bowlly) ([1927)
- The Broadway Bellhops (1927)
- Lillie Delk Christian, Okeh Records; 1927
- Hadda Brooks
- Nat King Cole (1957)
- Eddie Condon and his Band (1952)
- Doris Day (1955) in the film Love Me or Leave Me and Day's Love Me or Leave Me album.
- Craig Douglas
- Ruth Etting (1927)
- Connie Francis - Connie Francis at the Copa (1961)
- Four Freshmen - The Four Freshmen and Five Guitars (1959)
- Judy Garland and Barbra Streisand (As part of their "Hooray For Love" medley in 1963)
- Judy Garland and Liza Minnelli (1964)
- Jackie Gleason Orchestra (1957)
- Dolores Hope
- Jack Hylton and his orchestra ([1927)
- Phyllis Dare and the Gaiety Theatre Orchestra (1927)
- Harry James
- Al Jolson (Stage production, 1925)
- Al Jolson (1928) The Singing Fool motion picture
- Dick Jurgens and his Orchestra (vocal: Ray Mcintosh) (1950)
- Peggy King
- Layton & Johnstone
- Jerry Lewis - a single release in 1957.
- Dorothy Loudon
- Gordon MacRae
- Joni Mitchell (2000)
- Jaye P. Morgan
- Patti Page (1959)
- Johnnie Ray (1958)
- Barbara Rosene
- Pee Wee Russell
- Dinah Shore (1949) and on Dinah, Yes Indeed! (1959)
- Frank Sinatra (with Hugo Winterhalter) (1949)
- Frank Sinatra (with Billy May) ([1958)
- Frank Sinatra (with Nelson Riddle) (1960)
- Whispering Jack Smith (1927)
- Sonny Stitt
- Barbra Streisand
- Steve Tyrell
- Jerry Vale
- Helen Ward
- Paul Whiteman and his Orchestra (Instrumental) (1927)
- Faron Young
- Lester Young
