= Nacio Herb Brown =

American songwriter (1896–1964)

- Ignacio Herbert Brown

Background information
- Born: Ignacio Herbert Brown; February 22, 1896; Deming, New Mexico, U.S.
- Died: September 28, 1964 (aged 68) San Francisco, California, U.S.
- Occupations: Composer, songwriter
- Spouses: Ruby Porter (m. ?; divorced 1931); Jeanne Borlini Lockhart (m. 1932; divorced c. 1935); Anita Page (m. 1934; ann. 1935) Elizabeth Maud "Beffie" Lippincott (m. 1939) Georgeann Morris (m. 1942)

Ignacio Herbert "Nacio Herb" Brown (February 22, 1896 – September 28, 1964) was an American composer of popular songs, movie scores and Broadway theatre music in the 1920s through the early 1950s. Amongst his most enduring work is the score for the 1952 musical film Singin' in the Rain.

== Early life ==
Ignacio Herbert Brown was born in Deming, New Mexico, United States, to Ignacio and Cora Brown. He had an older sister, Charlotte. In 1901, his family moved to Los Angeles, where he attended Manual Arts High School. His music education started with instruction from his mother, Cora Alice (Hopkins) Brown.

== Career ==
Brown first operated a tailoring business (1916), and then became a financially successful realtor, but he always wrote and played music. After his first hit "Coral Sea" (1920) and a first big hit, "When Buddha Smiles" (1921), he eventually became a full-time composer. He joined The American Society of Composers, Authors and Publishers (ASCAP) in 1926, the same year writing the piano instrumental "The Doll Dance". This was followed by two other Doll-based tunes, "Rag Doll" (1928) and "The Wedding of the Painted Doll", released in 1929.

In 1928, he was hired to work in Hollywood by MGM and write film scores for the new medium of sound film. For his film work, he often collaborated with lyricist Arthur Freed. Their music is collected for the most part in Singin' in the Rain. He appeared in the MGM variety film The Hollywood Revue of 1929. Brown also worked with Richard A. Whiting and Buddy De Sylva on Broadway Musicals such as Take a Chance.

Along with L. Wolfe Gilbert, Brown wrote the music for the children's television western, Hopalong Cassidy, which first aired in 1949.

== Personal life ==
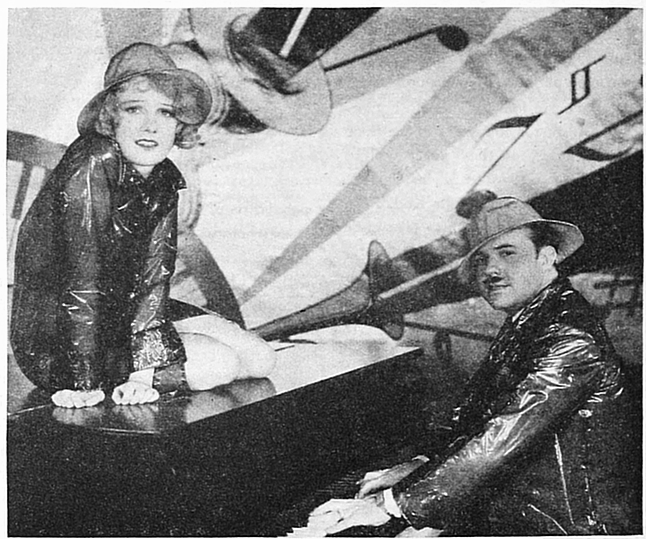
Brown with third wife Anita Page in 1929

Brown was first married to Ruby Porter, with whom he had one child, Nacio Herb Brown Jr., who also became a composer. Brown and Porter divorced in 1931 after Brown had an affair with Doris Eaton. In 1932 he married Jeanne Borlini Lockhart, but they divorced. In 1934 he married actress Anita Page, but they got an annulment less than a year later after Page discovered he was not yet divorced from Lockhart. In 1942 he married Georgeann Morris, a union that lasted until his death. He had three children throughout the marriages.

After an 18-month illness and a brief hospitalization at UCSF Medical Center, Brown died of cancer on September 28, 1964, in San Francisco, California, at the home of two of his children, Nacio Jan Brown and Candace Nacio Brown.

== Legacy ==
Brown was inducted into the Songwriters Hall of Fame in 1970, and into the New Mexico Entertainment Hall of Fame in 2012.

== Published songs and music ==
- "All I Do Is Dream of You"
- "Alone"
- "American Bolero"
- "Avalon Town"
- "Broadway Melody"
- "Broadway Rhythm"
- "Doll Dance"
- "Eadie Was a Lady"
- "Good Morning"
- "The Hoodoo Man"
- "I've Got a Feelin’ You're Foolin"'
- "Love Is Where You Find It"
- "Lucky Star"
- "Make 'Em Laugh"
- "The Moon Is Low" (with Arthur Freed)
- "A New Moon Is Over My Shoulder"
- "Our Big Love Scene"
- "Pagan Love Song" (with Arthur Freed)
- "Paradise" (1931)
- "Should I"
- "Singin' in the Rain"
- "The Sneak"
- "Sweetheart Darlin"'
- "Temptation"
- "Wedding of the Painted Doll"
- "When Buddha Smiles" (1921)
- "Would You"
- "You Are My Lucky Star"
- "You Stepped Out of a Dream"
- "You Were Meant For Me"
