= Sinatra: The Musical =

2023 biographical musical by Joe DiPietro

Sinatra
- The Musical
- West End production poster
- Music: Various
- Lyrics: Various
- Book: Joe DiPietro
- Basis: The life and music of Frank Sinatra
- Premiere: 23 September 2023: Birmingham Repertory Theatre
- Productions: 2023 Birmingham; 2024 New York reading 2026 West End

Sinatra: The Musical is a biographical jukebox musical written by Joe DiPietro based on the life and music of Frank Sinatra. It premiered at the Birmingham Repertory Theatre in September 2023.

== Production history ==
=== World premiere: Birmingham, UK (2023) ===
The musical's premiere was at the Birmingham Repertory Theatre, where it had a limited run from 23 September 2023 to 28 October. The production was directed and choreographed by Kathleen Marshall, and produced by the Birmingham Rep in association with Universal Music Group Theatrical and Frank Sinatra Enterprises. Tony-Award winning actor Matt Doyle starred as Frank Sinatra, with Ana Villafañe playing Ava Gardner, and Phoebe Panaretos as Frank Sinatra's first wife, Nancy Sinatra.

=== New York industry reading (2024) ===
Following the Birmingham run, the musical had an invitation-only reading at the Apollo Theater in New York City on November 21, 2024 with the full orchestra. The cast featured Doyle, Villafañe and Panaretos reprising their roles as Frank Sinatra, Ava Gardner and Nancy Sinatra joined by Caroline Duffy Concannon as Little Nancy, Toni Di Buono as Dolly Sinatra, Mark Lotito as Marty Sinatra, and Brad Oscar as George Evans. The ensemble also featured David Abeles, Clyde Alves, Amber Ardolino, E. Clayton Cornelious, Stephen DeRosa, Donna English, Matthew Griffin, Nathan Lucrezio, Katerina McCrimmon, Morgan McGhee, Angel Reda, and Maya Lynn Sistruck.

=== London's West End (2026) ===
The Birmingham production opened in London's West End at the Aldwych Theatre with previews beginning 3 June 2026 (with a press night on 24 June), booking until April 2027. Joel Harper-Jackson was cast as Frank Sinatra, joined by Villafañe as Ava Gardner and Panaretos as Nancy Sinatra. Jenna Russell joins as Dolly Sinatra.

== Cast and characters ==
Character	Birmingham	West End
Character	2023	2026
Frank Sinatra	Matt Doyle	Joel Harper-Jackson
Ava Gardner	Ana Villafañe	Ana Villafañe
Nancy Sinatra	Phoebe Panaretos	Phoebe Panaretos
Marlene Dietrich	Maddy Ambus	Allana Taylor
Gene Kelly	Greg Bernstein	Adam Davidson
Dolly Sinatra	Dawn Buckland	Jenna Russell
Hedda Hopper	Helen Colby	Helen Colby
Judy Garland	Frances Dee	Jenna Innes
Nelson Riddle	Alex Gibson Giorgio	Sam Brown
Billie Holiday	Ryesha Higgs	Melissa Nettleford
Lee Mortimer	Stevie Hutchinson	Carl Au
Nat King Cole	Tyler Orphé-Baker	Oliver Adam-Reynolds
George Evans	Carl Patrick	Lee Zarrett
Lana Turner	Lottie Power	Becky Anderson
Marty Sinatra	Vincent Riotta	Marty Maguire
Sammy Davis, Jr.	Spin	—N/a
Mitch Miller / Harry Cohn	John Stacey	John Stacey
Little Nancy	Amelia Katie Connor; Effie Gell; Isla Granville	Sylvie Regan; Mia Savident; Felicity Walton
Ensemble	Samara Casteallo; Alastair Crosswell	Mia Musakembeva; Samuel Nicholas
Swing	Lindsay Atherton	Emma Crossley; Alexander Day; Christopher Gopaul; Stuart Hickey; Nardia Ruth; Christina Shand
