= Political life of Frank Sinatra =

Political activities, views, and activism of American singer and actor Frank Sinatra

Frank Sinatra
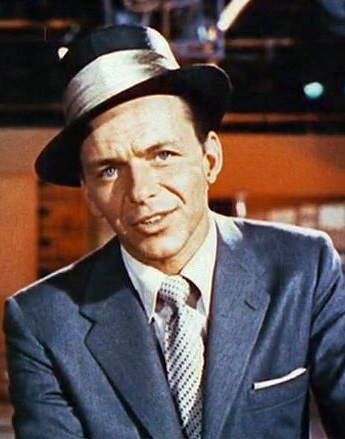
- Sinatra in 1957
- Born: Francis Albert Sinatra; December 12, 1915; Hoboken, New Jersey, U.S.
- Died: May 14, 1998 (aged 82); Los Angeles, California, U.S.
- Occupation: Singer • actor • producer • political activist
- Known for: Civil rights advocacy • Zionism • campaigning for FDR, Truman, JFK, Nixon, Reagan • party switch from liberal Democrat to conservative Republican
- Political party: Democratic (Democratic until 1970) • Republican (1970–1998)
- Spouse: Nancy Barbato (1939–1951) Ava Gardner (1951–1957) Mia Farrow (1966–1968) Barbara Marx (1976–1998)
- Children: Nancy • Frank Jr. • Tina

Frank Sinatra was an American singer, actor, producer, and a figure in 20th-century popular culture. Over six decades he was also a figure in American political life, evolving from a fiery New Deal liberal, civil-rights crusader, and staunch Democrat who campaigned for Roosevelt, Truman, Stevenson, and Kennedy into a conservative Republican who raised funds for Nixon and Reagan and received the Presidential Medal of Freedom from the latter.

Sinatra's opposition to racism and antisemitism has been linked to his childhood experiences in Hoboken, including anti-Italian prejudice, his relationship with a Jewish neighbor, and his mother Dolly's involvement in Democratic politics. He refused to perform at segregated venues, supported the desegregation of casino in Nevada, and financially supported civil rights causes, including organizations associated with Martin Luther King Jr. He also appeared in *The House I live In*, an anti-racist short film received an honorary Academy Award.

Sinatra was a lifelong Zionist who smuggled money for arms to the Haganah in 1948, performed multiple sold-out concert tours in Israel, founded Arab-Jewish youth centers in Nazareth and at Hebrew University, donated entire film salaries to Israeli causes, and maintained his passionate support even after his conservative turn. His political journey was marked by personal humiliation (the 1962 Kennedy Palm Springs snub), alleged Mafia associations that cost him friendships and his Nevada gaming license, FBI surveillance for both left-wing and mob ties, and a growing conviction that the Democratic Party had abandoned traditional American values for radicalism on crime, welfare, and foreign policy. Decades of campaigns, fundraisers, and direct access to presidents of both parties made him one of the politically active entertainers of his era. His trajectory—from ardent 1940s progressive to 1980s Reagan Republican—mirrored and prefigured America’s own ideological realignment.

== Early life and formative influences ==
Francis Albert Sinatra was born in a cold-water flat in Hoboken, New Jersey, to Italian immigrants Antonino Martino “Marty” Sinatra and Natalina “Dolly” Garaventa. Dolly was a midwife, backroom abortionist, and formidable Democratic ward leader who delivered coal, jobs, and favors in exchange for votes and was arrested multiple times. She dominated local politics and taught her son the mechanics of power and loyalty to the underdog.

Growing up in a tough Italian neighborhood, Sinatra endured constant ethnic slurs (“wop,” “dago,” “guinea”) that left him with a permanent hatred of bigotry. A Yiddish-speaking Jewish babysitter, Mrs. Sarah Golden, spoke only Yiddish to him, gave him a mezuzah he wore for decades, and became his “Jewish mother.” He later joked he knew more Yiddish than Italian and called himself “an honorary Jew” or “King of the Jews.” These experiences forged Sinatra’s lifelong identification with minorities and outsiders.

== 1940s: New Deal progressive and anti-racism pioneer ==
Sinatra credited Roosevelt’s fireside chats with saving America and wrote the president an admiring letter. On September 28, 1944, he was invited to the White House and agreed to help Democratic voter drives. He donated $7,500 (≈$130,000 in 2025 dollars), recorded radio spots, spoke at Carnegie Hall and Madison Square Garden, and declared Roosevelt “the greatest guy alive today.”

In 1945 he starred in the RKO short The House I Live In, interrupting a gang harassing a Jewish boy to preach tolerance: “Look, fellas, religion makes no difference except to a Nazi or somebody as stupid… Don’t let them make suckers out of you.” The film won an honorary Academy Award in 1946; Sinatra prized this Oscar above all others. That same year, invited by Gary, Indiana’s mayor, he addressed striking white students opposing integration at Froebel High School, comparing their actions to Nazism and earning accusations of communism (which he denied with humor). He published an open letter to Henry A. Wallace in The New Republic (January 6, 1947) praising Wallace’s progressive vision.

== 1950s–1960s: Rat Pack, Kennedy glory and betrayal ==
Sinatra campaigned for Truman (1948) and Stevenson (1952, 1956). In 1960 he became John F. Kennedy’s closest celebrity ally. The Rat Pack toured for JFK; Sinatra rewrote “High Hopes,” commissioned Sammy Cahn lyrics, and produced the January 19, 1961 Inaugural Gala that raised millions. Sinatra is reported to have served as a liaison and intermediary between Kennedy and Chicago Outfit mafia boss Sam Giancana. Chicago FBI agent William F. Roemer recalls that during one of his surveillance operations, Giancana's underling Chuckie English came to his car with a message from Giancana: "He says if Kennedy wants to talk to him, he knows who to go through". When Roemer asked if he was speaking about Sinatra, English affirmed it. According to Sinatra's daughter Tina, Kennedy's father Joseph P. Kennedy Sr., approached Sinatra in order to get Giancana to secure the trade union vote for Kennedy in the West Virginia primary election, which he agreed to do. In March 1962, under RFK’s anti-mob pressure, Kennedy canceled a Palm Springs stay that Sinatra had lavishly prepared for (new heliport, guest houses) and stayed with Bing Crosby, a Republican, instead. Sinatra was devastated, destroyed the heliport with a sledgehammer, and never forgave RFK.

In 1968 Sinatra embarked on a concert tour in support of Democratic Party candidate Hubert Humphrey. Former Kefauver Committee associate counsel Joseph L. Nellis penned a letter to Humphrey encouraging him to dissassociate himself from Sinatra because he was "unquestionably connected with the underworld". Humphrey told Nellis that he would be careful with Sinatra, but that he could not distance himself from the singer because he was too powerful in Hollywood and the money he raised was too great.

== Civil rights activism ==
From the 1940s Sinatra refused to perform for segregated audiences. In Las Vegas he forced the Sands to serve Nat King Cole in the dining room and, with Sammy Davis Jr., ended Jim Crow policies in Nevada hotels and casinos by 1961. He headlined Carnegie Hall for Martin Luther King Jr. in 1961, led Rat Pack boycotts, donated heavily to the Southern Christian Leadership Conference and voter registration, and was praised by Vice President Hubert Humphrey after the Watts riots for teaching tolerance. Orson Welles witnessed Sinatra physically threaten a restaurant owner who refused service to a Black musician.

== Lifelong Zionism and support for Israel ==
In 1947 Sinatra headlined “Action for Palestine” at the Hollywood Bowl. In 1948, at Teddy Kollek’s request, he smuggled $1 million cash in a paper bag onto a New York ship for Haganah arms purchases, later explaining: “I wanted to help, I was afraid they might fall down.” Arab countries banned his music for decades. In 1962 he gave seven sold-out Independence Day concerts in Israel, met David Ben-Gurion and Moshe Dayan, visited Yad Vashem (declaring Israel “a wonderful country worth dying for”), and used proceeds to found the Frank Sinatra International Youth Center in Nazareth for Arab and Jewish children. He returned repeatedly, donated his entire fee from Cast a Giant Shadow (1966), raised $1 million for the Hebrew University student center (opened 1978; bombed by Hamas 2002), and performed benefits for Israel Bonds and the Simon Wiesenthal Center.

== Party switch and Republican years ==
By 1969 Sinatra befriended Spiro Agnew. In 1970 he endorsed Ronald Reagan’s California re-election. In July 1972, rejecting George McGovern’s “radical” platform, he switched parties and backed Nixon, telling daughter Tina: “The older you get, the more conservative you get.”

In 1980 he raised millions for Reagan and produced his inaugural gala. In 1984 he hosted Reagan in Hoboken. Reagan awarded him the Presidential Medal of Freedom in 1985.

== Organized crime allegations and political consequences ==
The FBI’s 2,400-page file documented friendships with Giancana, the Fischettis, and others. Sinatra hosted Giancana at Cal-Neva in 1963, lost his gaming license, and was repeatedly denied ties under oath. The allegations destroyed his Kennedy relationship, triggered the Palm Springs snub, and made him politically radioactive to Democrats while later Republican administrations embraced him.
