= Personal life of Frank Sinatra =

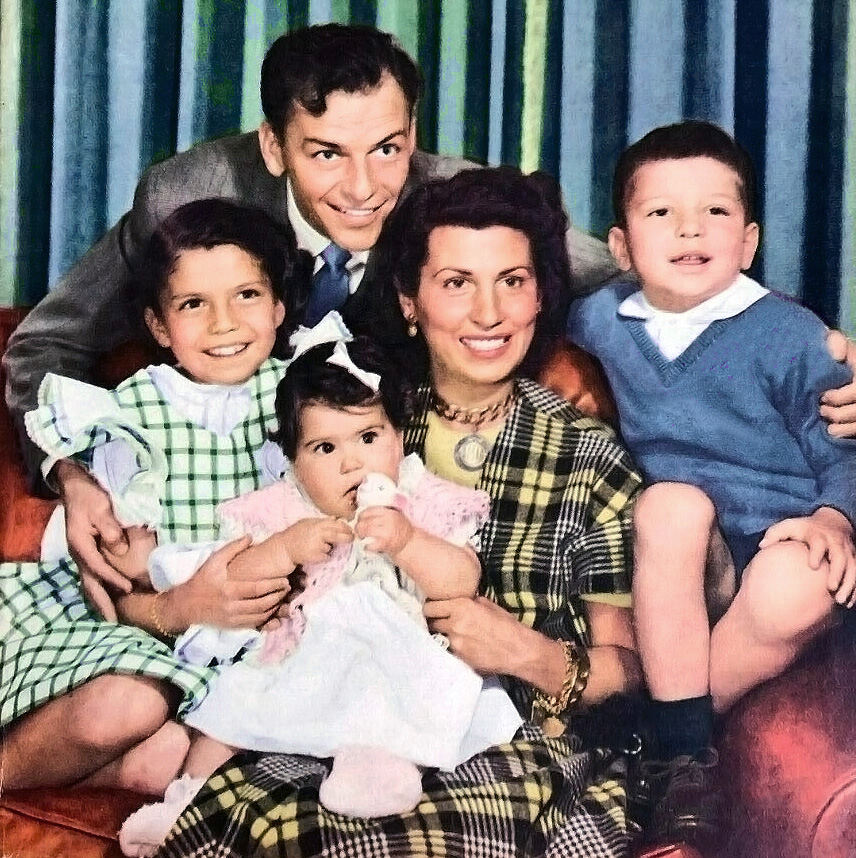
1949 family portrait of Sinatra with his first wife, Nancy Barbato, and their three children, Nancy, Tina, and Frank Jr.

Frank Sinatra had many close relationships throughout his life. He was married four times and had at least six other notable relationships in between. He had three verified children, as well as more than one of questionable paternity.

== Marriages ==
=== Nancy Barbato ===
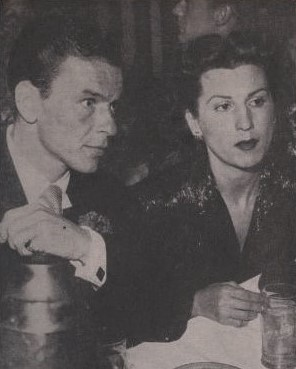
Frank Sinatra and Nancy Barbato at Ciro's, 1949

Frank Sinatra met Nancy Barbato (1917–2018) in the summer of 1934, and they married on February 4, 1939, in Jersey City, New Jersey, Barbato's home town. The wedding was held at Our Lady of Sorrows Church at 93 Clerk Street, after which the newlyweds lived in an apartment house at 137 Bergen Avenue. Their first child, Nancy Sinatra, was born on June 8, 1940, and their son, Francis Wayne Sinatra, known as Frank Sinatra Jr., was born on January 10, 1944. Both were born at the Margaret Hague Hospital in Jersey City.

Following the family's move to Hollywood, Sinatra began engaging in extramarital affairs, the first known with Marilyn Maxwell. These affairs also became public knowledge and caused great embarrassment to Nancy Barbato Sinatra, who considered calling off their marriage then and had an abortion when she became pregnant in 1946. A third child, Christina Sinatra, known as "Tina", was born on June 20, 1948.

The couple announced their separation on Valentine's Day, February 14, 1950, with Sinatra's additional extramarital affair with Ava Gardner compounding his transgressions and becoming public knowledge. After originally just seeking a legal separation, Frank and Nancy Sinatra decided some months later to file for divorce, and this divorce became final on October 29, 1951. Frank Sinatra's affair and relationship with Gardner had become more serious, and she later became his second wife.

Less widely known were Sinatra's continuing visits, his long, confiding late-night phone calls, and the convivial family dinners on birthdays, holidays and other occasions. "Throughout the many years after they split, my grandfather came to visit whenever his crazy life would allow it," Mrs. Sinatra's granddaughter AJ Lambert wrote in a 2015 remembrance in Vanity Fair. "I can remember times when she would be on the phone with her ex-husband, and the next thing I knew some eggplant was coming out of the freezer to thaw so that she could make him some sandwiches when he showed up." She remained profoundly private, uttering barely a word in public about her life with Sinatra, though their mutual feelings were clear, her granddaughter recalled, to those who knew them best. "I know he never stopped loving her," Lambert wrote. "And I know she never stopped loving him."

Nancy Barbato Sinatra died in 2018 at the age of 101. She never remarried and had outlived not only her ex-husband but also her son Frank Jr., who died in 2016.

=== Ava Gardner ===
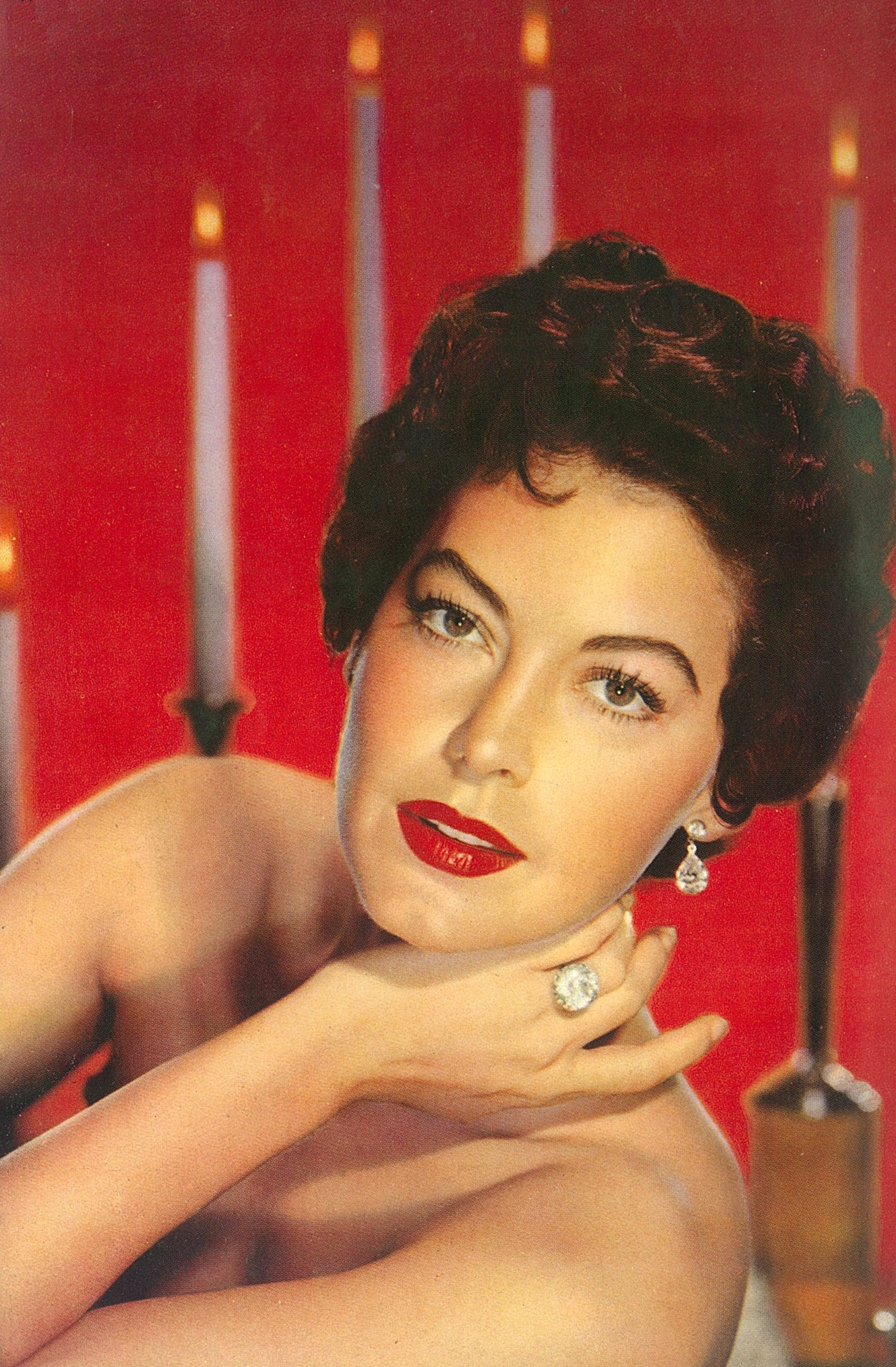
Ava Gardner, Sinatra's wife from 1951 to 1957

Biographer Kitty Kelley claims that Sinatra had first seen photographs of Ava Gardner in a magazine and had sworn that he would marry her. Ruth Rosenthal, a friend of Gardner's, stated that Gardner initially detested him upon meeting him at MGM, finding him to be "conceited, arrogant and overpowering". Their similarities, however, from vices like smoking, drinking hard liquor and cursing, to their volatile tempers and love of violent sports, soon became apparent. Sinatra separated from Nancy on Valentine's Day 1950, after he confessed to his passionate affair with Gardner, and she subsequently locked him out of the house and hired a lawyer. Although Nancy initially refused to divorce him, Sinatra was eventually granted a divorce in Nevada in October 1951, and subsequently obtained a marriage license in Pennsylvania, marrying Gardner in a small ceremony on November 7, 1951. Following a turbulent marriage, with many well-publicized fights and altercations and an abortion in November 1952, the couple formally announced their separation October 29, 1953 through MGM.

Gardner filed for divorce in June 1954, at a time when she was dating matador Luis Miguel Dominguín, but the divorce was not settled until July 1957. Sinatra blamed Peter Lawford, who had dated Gardner before, for the split, and it took six years for Sinatra to forgive him. He was inconsolable in the fall of 1953 after the split, and according to Kelley, on November 18, Jimmy Van Heusen found him in the elevator of his 57th Street apartment with his wrists slashed. (Note: Kelley states that this was covered up by his representatives who told the press he had been admitted to hospital, suffering from "complete physical exhaustion, severe loss of weight, and a tremendous amount of emotional strain", and that he had simply had an accident with a broken glass.) After the divorce, Sinatra continued to feel very strongly for Gardner and they remained friends for life. Additionally, Sinatra took responsibility for Gardner's business affairs long after the split, and was still dealing with her finances in 1976. When she fell into ill health in later years, Sinatra paid $50,000 towards her medical bills. Gardner's power in Hollywood helped Sinatra get cast in From Here to Eternity (1953) and his subsequent Academy Award for Best Supporting Actor helped revitalize Sinatra's film career.

=== Mia Farrow ===
Sinatra married actress Mia Farrow on July 19, 1966, when she was 21 and he was 50. At the time, Sinatra was enjoying a wave of renewed popularity as the song "Strangers in the Night" returned him to the top of the Billboard charts only seventeen days later. They met on the set of Sinatra's film Von Ryan's Express. She agreed to appear in his 1968 film The Detective, but when she reneged as her filming schedule for Rosemary's Baby overran, Sinatra served her divorce papers in front of the cast and crew; they were divorced in Mexico in August 1968. In an interview for the November 2013 issue of Vanity Fair, Farrow said that she and Sinatra "never really split up" and answered "possibly" when asked if her son Ronan might be Sinatra's.

=== Barbara Marx ===
On July 11, 1976, Sinatra married Barbara Marx (formerly married to Zeppo Marx, the straight man in the Marx brothers' act), who converted to Catholicism to marry him. She remained his wife until his death, although her relations with Sinatra's children were consistently portrayed as stormy, something Nancy Sinatra confirmed when she publicly claimed that Barbara had not bothered to call Frank's children even when Frank was close to his death, although they were close by, and the children missed the opportunity to be at their father's bedside when he died.

In 2021, an unknown individual vandalised Sinatra's grave marker, attempting to chisel away the word "husband". The damaged marker was replaced with a new one with the words, "Sleep warm, poppa", the same words that his daughter Tina had buried with him.

== Relationships ==
Sinatra had numerous extramarital affairs, the first of which was with blonde starlet Alora Gooding from October 1940 while in Hollywood, his "first big love away from home", according to Nick Sevano. Next followed Rita Maritt, a 16-year-old Long Island debutante; the daughter of an oil baron; and Mary Lou Watts, a wealthy socialite. Gossip magazines published details of affairs with the likes of Lana Turner and Marilyn Maxwell.

=== Lana Turner ===
Summers and Swan claimed that Turner had gushed of a "very serious affair" between the two, and that they had faked splitting up their relationship just to oblige MGM's concerns. Turner later denied the claims in her 1982 autobiography, saying that "the closest things to dates Frank and I enjoyed were a few box lunches at MGM".

=== Judy Garland ===
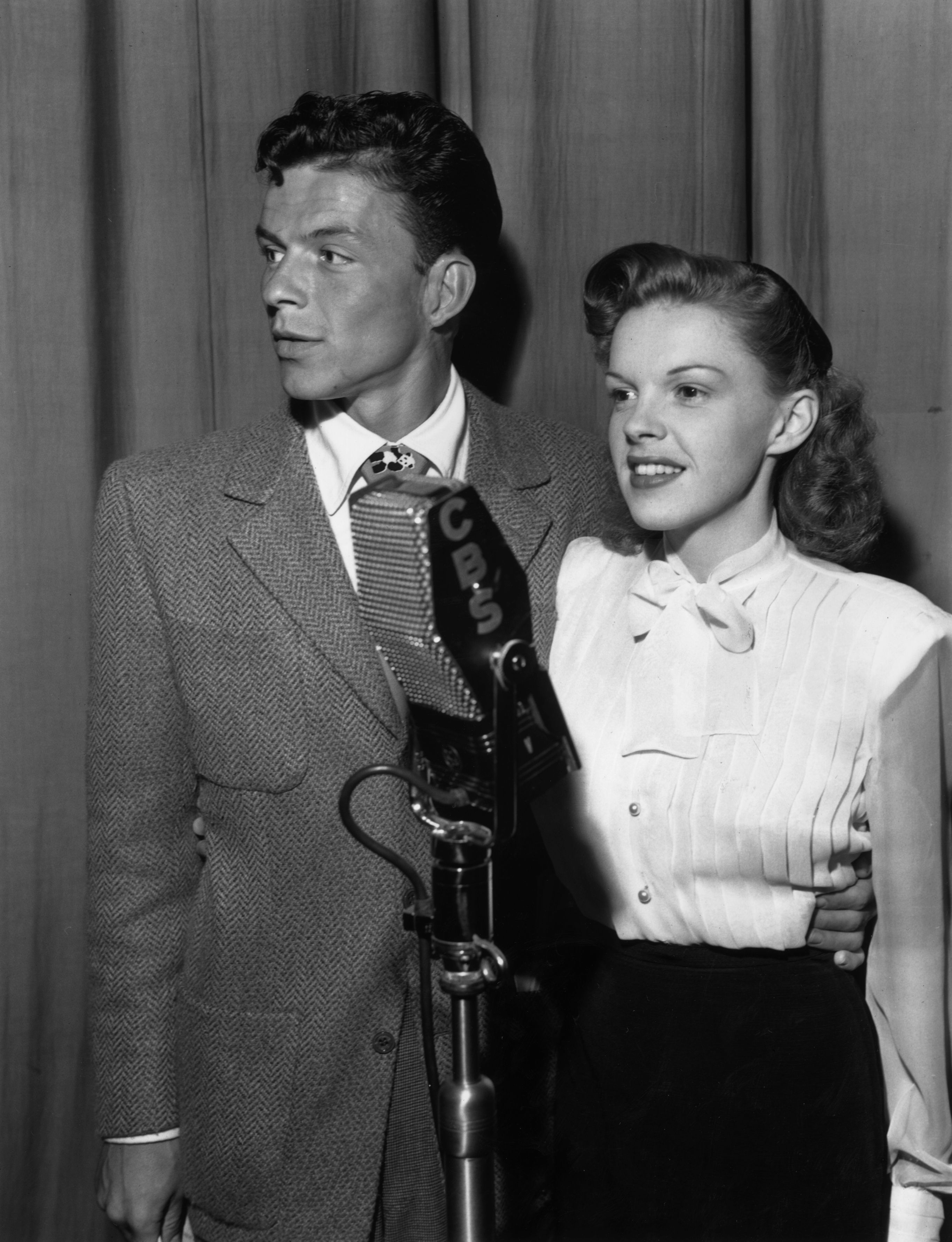
Promotional photo of Sinatra and Garland on a 1944 episode of The Frank Sinatra Show on CBS Radio

Sinatra and Judy Garland remained good friends until her death in 1969, but on only two occasions were the two legendary singers romantically involved. The first was in 1949, when Garland was recovering from a nervous breakdown and the two went on a romantic rendezvous in the Hamptons (Garland was still married to director Vincente Minnelli). The second was during one of Garland's many separations from her third husband Sid Luft in 1955. Sinatra had just come off his messy separation from Ava Gardner and was spotted in Garland's company until Luft found out.

=== Lauren Bacall ===
Sinatra was very close to Lauren Bacall. According to Kelley, her husband Humphrey Bogart believed that Sinatra was in love with Bacall and failed to attend the Sands on Bacall's 32nd birthday out of jealousy, though the two men were on good terms. Sinatra and Bacall were frequently seen together in public throughout 1957, and on March 11, 1958, they reportedly became engaged, though Sinatra denied intending to marry her.

=== Juliet Prowse ===
Sinatra was also engaged to India-born South African actress and dancer Juliet Prowse for a short while from fall 1961 to early 1962, before Sinatra broke the engagement late that year because Prowse refused to give up her career. The two first met on the set of the 1960 film Can-Can.

=== Marilyn Monroe ===
Sinatra met Marilyn Monroe in 1954 while he was still married to Ava Gardner, although some sources suggest they may have first met earlier. He was a friend of Monroe's second husband, Joe DiMaggio. Following DiMaggio and Monroe's divorce, Sinatra accompanied DiMaggio and writer James Bacon to investigate rumors that Monroe was seeing her vocal coach Hal Schaefer. The group mistakenly entered the apartment of another woman, Florence Kotz, in what later became known as the "wrong door raid".

Accounts differ regarding the nature of Sinatra's later relationship with Monroe. Some sources claim they had a brief romantic involvement during the summer of 1961, while others describe them primarily as close friends. However, the extent of their relationship remains unclear, and most reputable biographers consider assertions of a serious affair or discussions of marriage to be unsubstantiated and largely speculative.

=== Angie Dickinson ===
Sinatra was romantically involved with Angie Dickinson off and on for ten years from around 1954 to 1964. "We had an incredible 'like' for each other" and "a very comfortable relationship", stated Dickinson in 1999, adding that if they'd had "a burning love affair" then the romance might not have lasted as long. The two remained friends until Sinatra's death in 1998.

== Children ==
Sinatra had three children with his first wife, Nancy Barbato: Nancy Sinatra (born June 8, 1940), Frank Sinatra Jr. (January 10, 1944 – March 16, 2016), and Christina "Tina" Sinatra (born June 20, 1948). Although Sinatra did not remain faithful to his wife, he was by many accounts a devoted father.

On December 8, 1963, Frank Sinatra Jr. was kidnapped. Sinatra paid the kidnappers' $240,000 ransom demand (even offering $1,000,000, although the kidnappers bizarrely turned down this offer), and his son was released unharmed on December 10. (In 2022 terms, the demand would be the equivalent of $2.32 million, and the amount Sinatra offered would be equivalent to $9.68 million.) Because the kidnappers demanded that Sinatra call them only from pay phones, Sinatra carried a roll of dimes with him throughout the ordeal, and this became a lifelong habit. The kidnappers were subsequently apprehended and convicted. A 2003 movie called Stealing Sinatra was made about the incident. The radio program This American Life interviewed one of the kidnappers, Barry Keenan, in the 2002 episode "Plan B".

Julie Sinatra (born Julie Ann Maria Lyma on February 10, 1943) claims to be Sinatra's daughter through an unacknowledged affair that he had with a showgirl, Dorothy Bunocelli, in the 1940s. She legally changed her last name to Sinatra in 2000. Awarded $100,000 by the Sinatra estate in 2002, elements of her story concerning her mother's trip to Cuba with Sinatra have been disputed.

Actress Eva Bartok claimed that her daughter Deana's biological father was Frank Sinatra, with whom she had a brief affair in 1956.

In an interview for the November 2013 issue of Vanity Fair, Mia Farrow said that she and Sinatra "never really split up" and answered "possibly" when asked if her son Ronan Farrow might be Sinatra's.

== Personality ==
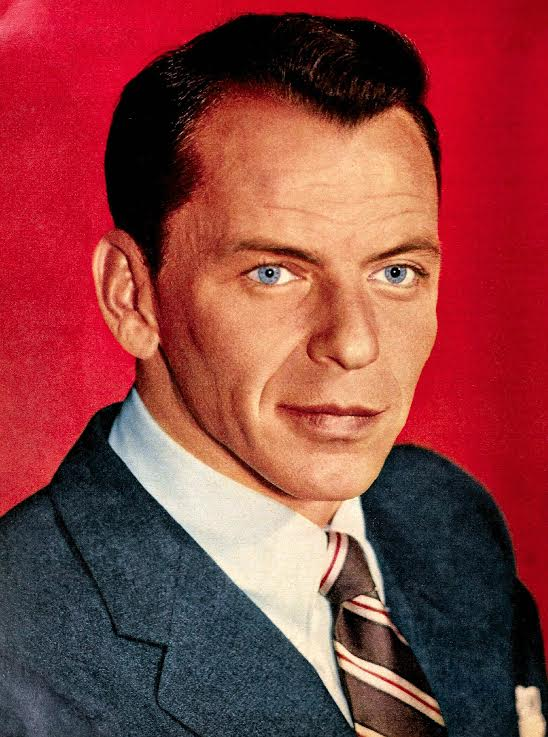
Sinatra in 1957

In his spare time, Sinatra enjoyed listening to classical music, and would attend concerts when he could. He also liked opera, particularly Luciano Pavarotti, and told himself, "I'm just a wop baritone. This guy can really sing". In return, music critic Henry Pleasants said that he had rarely interviewed an opera singer who did not have a collection of Sinatra's recordings. Jo-Caroll Dennison commented that Sinatra had "great inner strength", and that his energy and drive was "enormous". A workaholic, he reportedly slept for only four hours a night on average. Rojek considers him to have been an "overtly sexual performer, caressing the microphone and standing in a suggestive manner". Impeccable with his dress (Note: Sinatra always dressed immaculately, both in his professional and private life. He believed that as he was the best, he had to give his best to the audience, and would wear expensive custom-tailored tuxedos on stage as a sign of respect and to look important.) and cleanliness, while with the Tommy Dorsey band he developed the nickname "Lady Macbeth", because of frequent showering and switching his outfits. He enjoyed golf, and would often play with golf champion Ken Venturi at the course in Palm Springs, where he lived.

Throughout his life, Sinatra had mood swings and bouts of mild to severe depression, admitting to an interviewer in the 1950s that "I have an over-acute capacity for sadness as well as elation". Avoiding solitude and unglamorous surroundings at all costs, he struggled with the conflicting need "to get away from it all, but not too far away." Anthony Quinn once stated that he had a "cruel streak in his personality", but that he still loved him as he was "what all men are and not one man in a million ever is". Sinatra's mood swings often developed into violence, directed at people he felt had crossed him, particularly journalists who gave him scathing reviews, publicists and photographers. He received negative press for fights with Lee Mortimer in 1947, photographer Eddie Schisser in Houston in 1950, and Judy Garland's publicist Jim Byron in 1954, whom he reportedly referred to as a "fucking parasite". Yet Sinatra was known for his generosity, particularly after his comeback. When Lee J. Cobb nearly died from a heart attack in June 1955, Sinatra flooded him with "books, flowers, delicacies", paid his hospital bills, and visited him daily, telling him that his finest acting was yet to come. In another instance, after a heated argument with manager Bobby Burns, rather than apologize, Sinatra bought him a brand-new Cadillac.

In a 1963 interview with Playboy magazine, Sinatra stated that his belief in God was similar to Albert Schweitzer, Bertrand Russell and Albert Einstein in that he had a "respect for life – in any form", but did not believe in "a personal God to whom I look for comfort or for a natural on the next roll of the dice". According to Kelley, he was critical of the church on numerous occasions, and had thought it hypocritical in Hoboken that Italians had to attend a different church from the Irish and Germans. Though turned off by organized religion at times, however, Sinatra had a deep faith that became public when he turned to the Catholic Church for healing after his mother died in a plane crash late in his career. He died as a practicing Catholic and had a Catholic burial.

== Cal Neva Lodge ==
In 1960, Sinatra bought a share in the Cal Neva Lodge & Casino, straddling the border between Nevada and California on the shores of Lake Tahoe. Though it opened only between June and September, Sinatra built the Celebrity Room theater, which attracted the likes of the other Rat Pack members, Red Skelton, Marilyn Monroe, Victor Borge, Joe E. Lewis, Lucille Ball, Lena Horne, Juliet Prowse, the McGuire Sisters and others. By 1962 he reportedly held a 50% share in the hotel. Sinatra's gambling license was temporarily stripped by the Nevada Gaming Control Board in 1963 after mobster Sam Giancana was spotted on the premises. Due to ongoing pressure from the FBI and Nevada Gaming Commission and mobster control of casinos, and trouble with the Mafia, Sinatra agreed to give up his share in Cal Neva and the Sands.

== Alleged organized-crime links ==
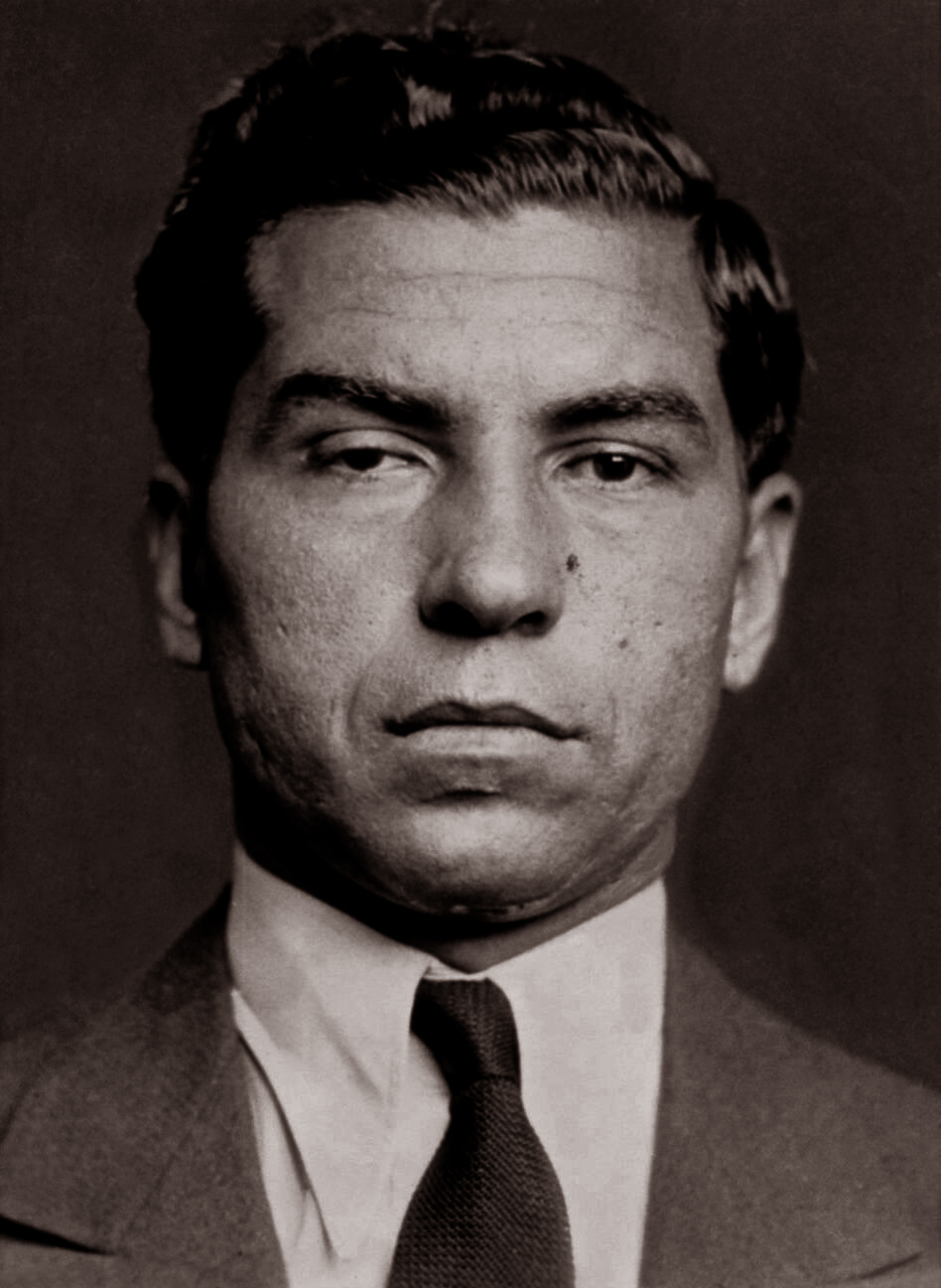
Mugshot of mobster Lucky Luciano in 1936

Sinatra became the stereotype of the "tough working-class Italian American", something which he embraced. He commented that he would "probably have ended in a life of crime" if it had not been for his interest in music. According to one writer, Eddie Fisher once remarked that Sinatra "wanted to be a hood" and had once told him that "I'd rather be a don of the Mafia than president of the United States". However, Peter Lawford had said that Sinatra referred to them only as the "boys" or "the Outfit", rather than the "Mafia".

In Sinatra's early days, mafia boss Willie Moretti helped him for kickbacks and was reported to have intervened in releasing him from his contract with Tommy Dorsey. Sinatra was present at the Mafia Havana Conference in 1946, and one newspaper published the headline "Shame, Sinatra" regarding his connection with Lucky Luciano. Kelley claims that Phyllis McGuire referred to Sam Giancana and Sinatra as the "best of friends", saying that they would often play golf together in Nevada and visit each other. She also quotes Jo-Carrol Silvers in saying that both Sinatra and her husband Phil Silvers "adored Bugsy Siegel so much", and would boast to friends about him and how many people he had killed. She also claimed that Silvers had told her that "like Bugsy, Frank had a Mafia Redneck mentality", with their shared love of high-living and grandiose plans in Las Vegas. Kelley claims that Sinatra and mobster Joseph Fischetti had been good friends from 1938 onward, and acted like "Sicilian brothers". She also states that Sinatra and Hank Sanicola were financial partners in the gossip magazine Hollywood Night Life with Mickey Cohen, a West Coast mobster; she claims that Sinatra funded $15,000 into the magazine to "get back at Hollywood".

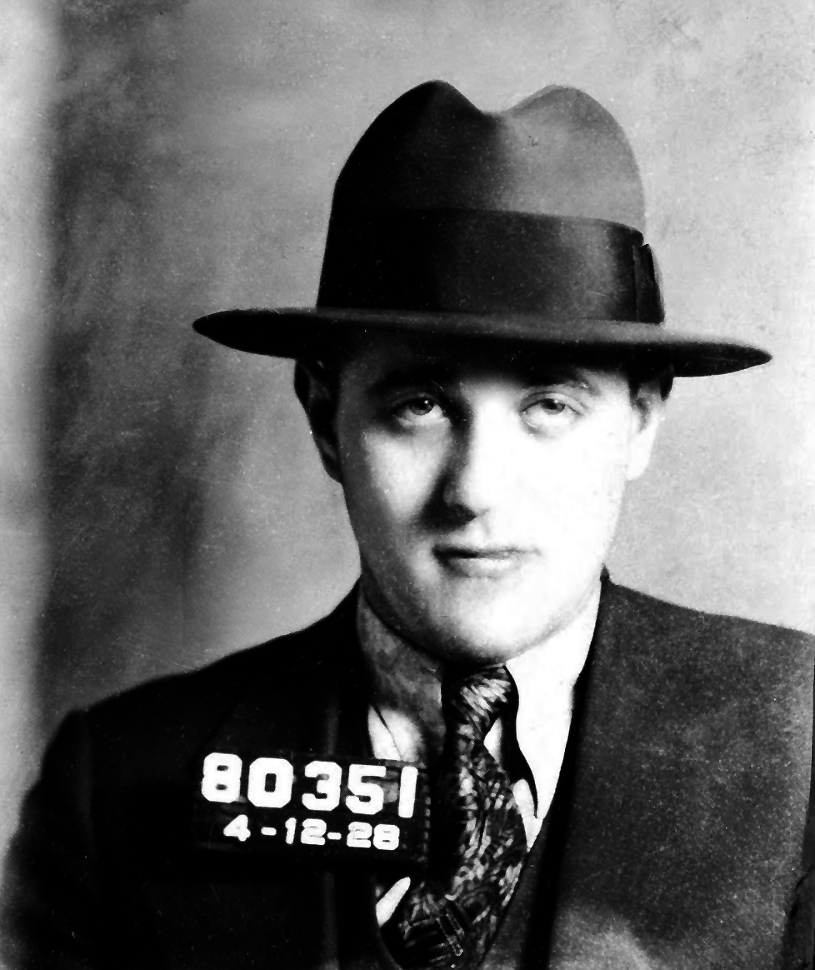
Mugshot of Bugsy Siegel in 1928

In 1951 Sinatra was under investigation for his mafia links by the US Senate's Kefauver Committee, headed by Senator Estes Kefauver. At Kefauver's request associate counsel Joseph L. Nellis interviewed him. At 4 AM on 1 March 1951, Nellis met Sinatra in an office at the top of the Rockefeller Center. Kefauver had come into possession of eight photographs of Sinatra with well-known mafia figures. One was of Sinatra with his arm around Lucky Luciano on the balcony of the Hotel Nacional in Cuba, another was of Sinatra seated with Luciano at a night club. He also appeared with the Fischetti brothers in a number of other pictures. Kefauver wanted to determine whether Sinatra should be called to testify before the committee, so he tasked Nellis with setting up an interview. Nellis contacted Sinatra's attorney Sol Gelb, through him the meeting was arranged.

Nellis quizzed Sinatra on his mafia connections. He admitted "knowing" or "seeing", and saying "hello" or "goodbye", to Lucky Luciano, the Fischetti brothers, Al Capone's cousins, Meyer Lansky, Frank Costello, Joe Adonis, Abner Zwillman, Willie Moretti, Gerardo Catena, and Bugsy Siegel. In one photograph Sinatra was seen with an attaché case departing a plane. Sinatra told Nellis that it contained razors and crayons. When Nellis suggested that there was over $100,000 in the case, Sinatra denied it, insisting that he gave no money to Luciano and that he did not know what line of business Luciano was in. He denied having any business dealings with any of the aforementioned men. At the end of the two hour meeting Nellis learnt nothing which would have enabled him to subpoena Sinatra before the official congressional hearings.

The FBI kept records amounting to 2,403 pages on Sinatra, becoming a natural target with his alleged Mafia ties, his ardent New Deal politics, and his friendship with John F. Kennedy. They kept him under surveillance for almost five decades beginning in the 1940s. The documents include accounts of Sinatra as the target of death threats and extortion schemes. The FBI documented that Sinatra was losing esteem with the Mafia as he grew closer to President Kennedy, whose brother Bobby was leading a crackdown on organized crime. They wiretapped Giancana's conversations, and found that Giancana no longer trusted Sinatra after he had been spotted with Kennedy. Their purported friendship finally came to an end in 1963 following the Nevada Gaming Commission's investigation into the casinos. According to Kelley, Giancana blamed Sinatra for the ordeal. However, it was acknowledged that Sinatra and Kennedy's friendship started becoming strained after Kennedy took office, in part because the Kennedy Administration, which included Bobby Kennedy as Attorney General, was very anti-Mafia. It was also acknowledged that their friendship also came to an end in 1962 after Sinatra's recent meeting with mobster Sam Giancana convinced Kennedy to cancel a visit to Sinatra's home while he visited Palm Springs and instead stay at the home of Bing Crosby, who was more willing to distance himself from the Mafia in public, despite also having mob ties.

The FBI's secret dossier on Sinatra was released in 1998 in response to Freedom of Information Act requests. Sinatra frequently denied personal and professional links with organized crime figures such as Bugsy Siegel, Carlo Gambino, Sam Giancana, Lucky Luciano, and Joseph Fischetti, despite the many connections and anecdotes reported. He vehemently declared that "any report that I fraternised with goons or racketeers is a vicious lie". In January 1967, he stood before a Las Vegas grand jury investigating mobster influence in the casinos and denied any financial exploits with Giancana.

In 1972 he testified before the U.S. House Select Committee on Crime where he was questioned about a $55,000 investment he made in the mafia-owned Berkshire Downs racetrack. He denied that he had been introduced to its owner by the mob boss Tommy Lucchese, although he admitted having met Lucchese on "two or three occasions". He was also quizzed about allegations made by mobster Joseph Barboza that Sinatra had business dealings with Raymond L. S. Patriarca, boss of the Patriarca crime family.
