= Sinatra (miniseries) =

1992 CBS biographical drama miniseries directed by James Steven Sadwith

- Promotional poster
- Genre: Biography; Drama
- Written by: William Mastrosimone; Abby Mann
- Directed by: James Steven Sadwith
- Starring: Philip Casnoff; Olympia Dukakis; Joe Santos; Gina Gershon; Nina Siemaszko; Marcia Gay Harden
- Theme music composer: Artie Butler
- Country of origin: United States
- Original language: English
- No. of episodes: 2

Production
- Executive producer: Tina Sinatra
- Producer: Richard M. Rosenbloom
- Production locations: Hoboken, New Jersey; Union Station - 800 N. Alameda Street, Downtown, Los Angeles
- Cinematography: Reynaldo Villalobos
- Editors: Steve Potter; Scott Vickrey
- Running time: 180 min (part 1); 120 min (part 2)
- Production companies: TS Productions; Warner Bros. Television

Original release
- Network: CBS
- Release: November 8 – November 10, 1992

Sinatra is a 1992 CBS biographical drama miniseries about singer Frank Sinatra, developed and executive produced by Frank's youngest daughter Tina Sinatra and approved by Frank himself. Directed by James Steven Sadwith, produced by Richard M. Rosenbloom, and written by William Mastrosimone and Abby Mann. It stars Philip Casnoff, Olympia Dukakis, Joe Santos, Gina Gershon, Nina Siemaszko, Bob Gunton, and Marcia Gay Harden, with some of Sinatra's vocals recreated by Tom Burlinson. It won two and was nominated for seven Primetime Emmy Awards, along with a win and two nominations for a Golden Globe Award. Released on November 8, 1992, it was re-released on a two-disc DVD Warner Home Video on May 13, 2008.

== Plot ==
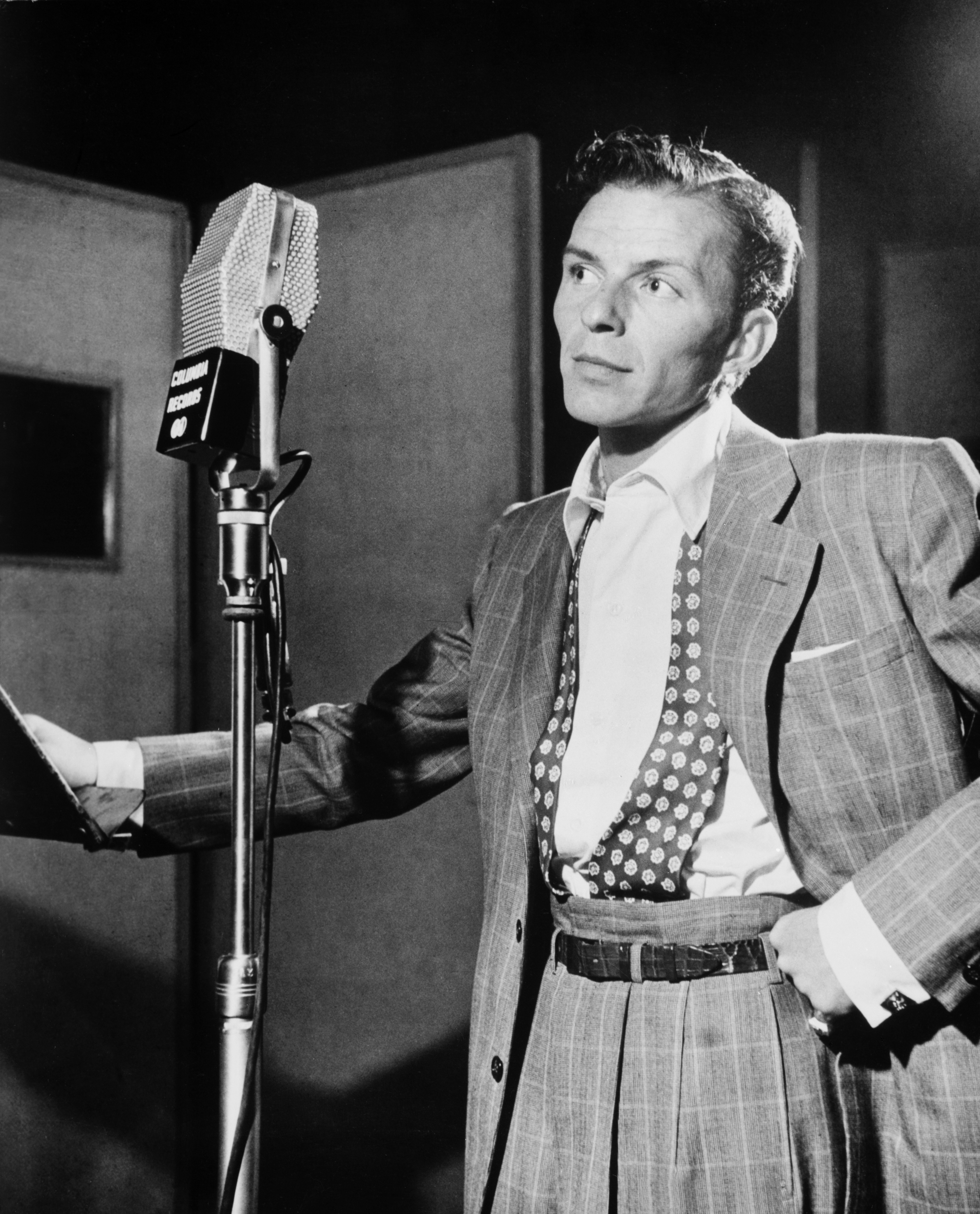
The film follows Frank Sinatra's (pictured in 1947) early life as a young boy in the 1920s, to his rise to fame in the 1930s and 1940s, ending in 1974. Sinatra is portrayed by Theatre and TV actor Philip Casnoff.

Growing up in Hoboken, New Jersey, as a young man, Frank Sinatra dreams of becoming a singer despite the objections of his father, Anthony "Marty" Sinatra, who believes he is abandoning a secure future. With the encouragement of his mother, Dolly, Sinatra leaves home to pursue music, determined to prove himself.

After performing with local bands, Sinatra joins Harry James's orchestra, gaining his first major break as a professional singer before moving to Tommy Dorsey's orchestra. There, he develops his distinctive vocal style by studying Dorsey's breath control. While touring with the band, he openly opposes racial segregation by confronting hotel staff who refuse accommodation to arranger Sy Oliver because of his colour. His growing popularity leads him to seek a solo career, straining his relationship with Dorsey as he breaks away from the band. Sinatra's success soon makes him a recording star, concert attraction and Hollywood actor, despite skepticism from promoters who doubt his ability to headline major venues.

As his fame grows, Sinatra's marriage to his first wife, Nancy Barbato, begins to deteriorate under the pressures of his career and repeated infidelities. While filming Anchors Aweigh, he meets actress Ava Gardner, and the two begin a passionate but turbulent romance that ultimately ends his marriage. Their relationship is marked by jealousy, frequent arguments and conflicting career ambitions, including Gardner's decision to terminate a pregnancy, which deeply damages their marriage. Professionally, Sinatra faces setbacks as his popularity declines and negative publicity surrounds his associations with alleged organized crime figures. Determined to revive his career, he fights for the role of Private Angelo Maggio in From Here to Eternity, believing it will restore his reputation. His performance earns him the Academy Award for Best Supporting Actor, re-establishing him as a major star and revitalizes both his acting and recording careers.

During the 1950s and 1960s, Sinatra becomes a leading entertainer in Las Vegas and a central figure in American popular culture. He remains a loyal friend to Sammy Davis Jr., encouraging him to resume performing after Davis loses an eye in a car accident. Sinatra becomes a prominent supporter and friend of Senator John F. Kennedy, campaigning for his successful 1960 presidential election, and forms the Rat Pack with Davis, Dean Martin, Peter Lawford and Joey Bishop. However, his relationship with Lawford deteriorates after Kennedy cancels plans to stay at Sinatra's Palm Springs estate, straining Sinatra's ties to the Kennedy family. Sinatra later marries actress Mia Farrow, but their conflicting career priorities and age difference contribute to the collapse of the marriage.

At the end of the film, Sinatra contemplates retirement while visiting his dying father. Marty, who once dismissed his son's ambitions, finally acknowledges Sinatra's accomplishments and tells him that he is "no quitter," giving Frank the validation he had sought throughout his life. Six years later, in 1974, the film concludes with Sinatra performing "That's Life" at Madison Square Garden, reaffirming his enduring legacy as one of America's greatest entertainers.

== Cast ==
- Philip Casnoff as Frank Sinatra
  - Tom Burlinson as his singing voice
  - Adam LaVorgna as Frankie at 10
- Olympia Dukakis as Natalie "Dolly" Sinatra
- Joe Santos as Marty Sinatra
- Gina Gershon as Nancy Barbato Sinatra
- Nina Siemaszko as Mia Farrow
- Joe Grifasi as George Evans
- Marcia Gay Harden as Ava Gardner
- Bob Gunton as Tommy Dorsey
- David Raynr as Sammy Davis Jr.
- Ralph Seymour as Budd
- Jeff Corey as Quinlin
- Danny Gans as Dean Martin
- Vincent Guastaferro as Hank Sanicola
- James F. Kelly as John F. Kennedy
- Matthew Posey as Harry James
- Rod Steiger as Sam Giancana
- Carol Barbee as Marilyn Maxwell
- David Byrd as Michael Romanoff
- Paul Collins as Westbrook Pegler
- Maggie Egan as Jo Stafford
- Brian Markinson as Sonny Werblin
- Tony Simotes as Buddy Rich
- John Wesley as Sy Oliver
- Marc Grady Adams as Lee Mortimer
- Tony Gaetano as Humphrey Bogart
- Leata Galloway as Billie Holiday
- David A. Kimball as Benny Goodman
- Bruce Gray as Fred Zinneman
- Shelly Lipkin as Joey Bishop
- Jack Betts as Earl Wilson
- Rena Riffel as May Britt
- Brad Blaisdell as Skitch Henderson
- Chris Weatherhead as Mercedes McCambridge
- Patricia Supancic as Nancy at 14
- Beverley Mitchell as Nancy at 7–9
- Samantha Ward as Nancy at 3
- Cameron Phillip Williams as Frank Jr. at 10
- Jameson Rodgers as Frank Jr. at 4–6
- Jenny Regli as Tina at 6
- Floyd Levine as Director

== Production ==
=== Filming ===
Filming was shot on location in Hoboken, New Jersey, and at the Los Angeles Union Station in California.

== Reception ==
The series got a mostly positive reception but was accused of whitewashing the controversial aspects of Frank Sinatra's life.

=== Awards and nominations ===
Year	Award	Category	Nominee(s)	Result	Ref.
1993	American Cinema Editors Awards	Best Edited Episode from a Television Mini-Series	Scott Vickrey (for "Part I")	Nominated	
1993	American Society of Cinematographers Awards	Outstanding Achievement in Cinematography in Miniseries	Reynaldo Villalobos	Nominated	
1993	Artios Awards	Best Casting for TV Miniseries	Marcia Ross and Robert Litvak	Nominated	
1993	Golden Globe Awards	Best Miniseries or Motion Picture Made for Television		Won	
1993	Golden Globe Awards	Best Actor in a Miniseries or Motion Picture Made for Television	Philip Casnoff	Nominated	
1993	Golden Globe Awards	Best Supporting Actress in a Series, Miniseries or Motion Picture Made for Television	Olympia Dukakis	Nominated	
1993	Primetime Emmy Awards	Outstanding Miniseries	Tina Sinatra and Richard M. Rosenbloom	Nominated	
1993	Primetime Emmy Awards	Outstanding Individual Achievement in Directing for a Miniseries or a Special	James Steven Sadwith	Won	
1993	Primetime Emmy Awards	Outstanding Individual Achievement in Art Direction for a Miniseries or a Special	Veronica Hadfield, Richard L. Johnson, Cindy Carr, and Robin Royce (for "Part I")	Nominated	
1993	Primetime Emmy Awards	Outstanding Individual Achievement in Cinematography for a Miniseries or a Special	Reynaldo Villalobos (for "Part I")	Nominated	
1993	Primetime Emmy Awards	Outstanding Individual Achievement in Costume Design for a Miniseries or a Special	Shelley Komarov (for "Part I")	Won	
1993	Primetime Emmy Awards	Outstanding Individual Achievement in Editing for a Miniseries or a Special – Single Camera Production	Scott Vickrey (for "Part I")	Nominated	
1993	Primetime Emmy Awards	Outstanding Individual Achievement in Hairstyling for a Miniseries or a Special	Bette Iverson and Adele Taylor (for "Part I")	Nominated	
1993	Primetime Emmy Awards	Outstanding Individual Achievement in Music Direction	Artie Butler (for "Part I")	Nominated	
1993	Primetime Emmy Awards	Outstanding Sound Mixing for a Drama Miniseries or a Special	Maury Harris, Wayne Artman, Robert Fernandez, and Tom E. Dahl (for "Part I")	Nominated	
