= George Kalinsky =

American photographer (1936–2025)

George Kalinsky (April 14, 1936 – January 16, 2025) was an American photographer. He was the official photographer for Madison Square Garden from 1966 until his death and served as the official photographer at Radio City Music Hall. In November 2010, the National Arts Club awarded him their Medal of Honor for Photography.

== Life and career ==
Kalinsky was born in Hempstead, New York, on April 14, 1936, the son of Jewish parents Fay (née Rosen) and Samuel Kalinsky, a retailer.

Kalinsky's photos were featured in multiple publications, including Sports Illustrated, People, Newsweek, and The New York Times. He authored ten books.

In May 2009, the Rock and Roll Hall of Fame opened an exhibit dedicated to Kalinsky photographs of Madison Square Garden's most popular concerts. Many of these photographs are now part of the museum's permanent collection.

From the year 2010, the New York Mets, for whom Kalinsky had been the official photographer, displayed a collection of Kalinsky photographs throughout Citi Field.

Kalinsky was honored with the 2017 Legends Award by the Pratt Institute at a dinner at the Mandarin Hotel in November 2017. New York Historical had an exhibit "New York through the Lens of George Kalinsky" featuring 80 images of Kalinsky's work from the last 50 years. The show was well received and was on extended viewing until July 2018. The museum added this exhibit to their permanent collection. In February 2018, Sports Business Journal featured Kalinsky and his career on the front page of their magazine. Frank Sinatra Enterprises produced a documentary on Kalinsky's 50-year career.

Kalinsky died January 16, 2025, at age 88.

=== Notable photographs ===
==== New York City teams' Championships ====
- 1970 NBA Finals–Knicks defeat the Los Angeles Lakers for their first NBA championship.
- 1986 World Series–Mets defeat the Boston Red Sox to win World Series.
- 1994 Stanley Cup Final–Rangers win Stanley Cup–first in 54 years–over the Vancouver Canucks.

==== Political Conventions ====
- 1980 Democratic National Convention
- 1992 Democratic National Convention
- 2004 Republican National Convention

==== Other photographs ====
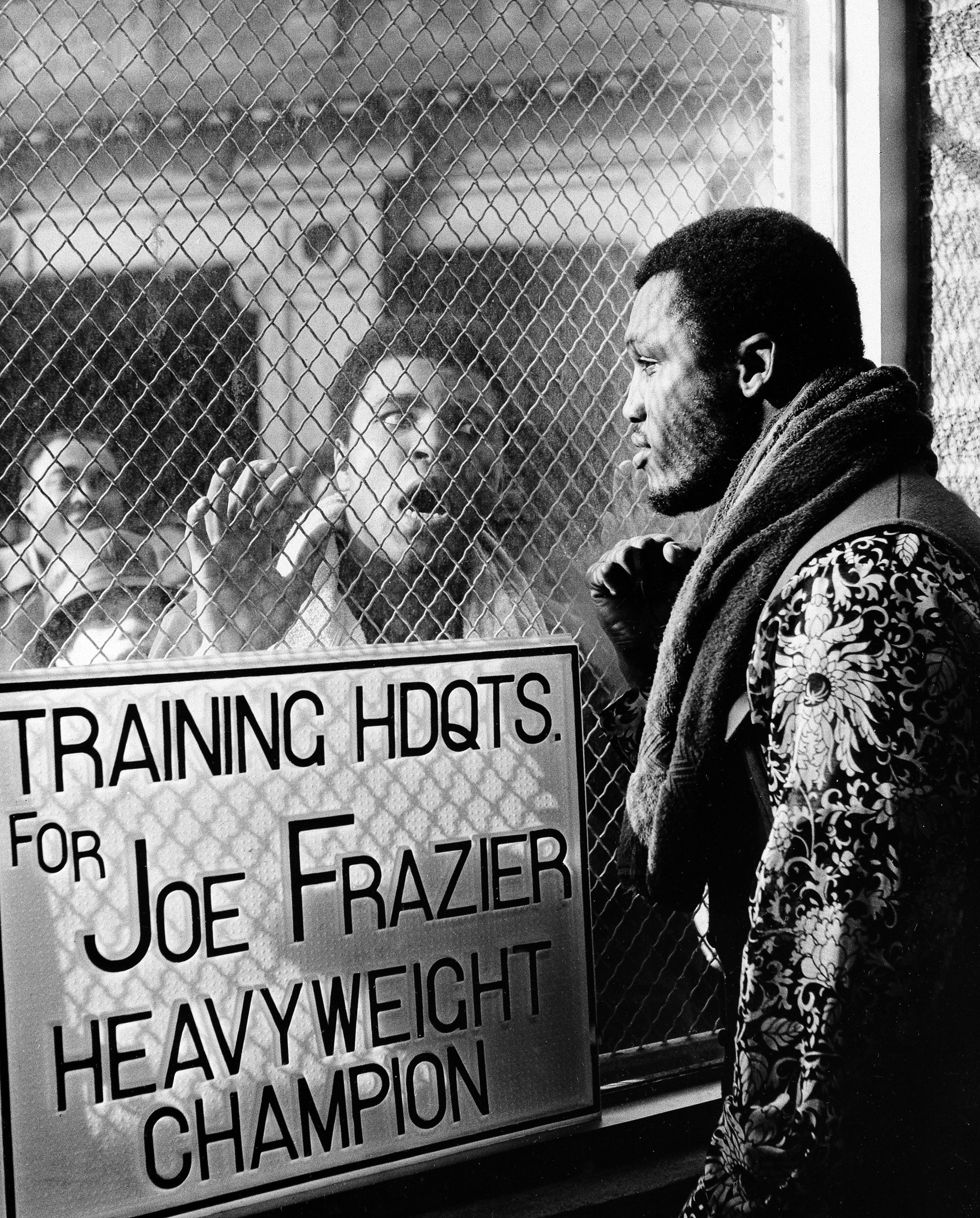
A photograph taken by Kalinsky to promote the Fight of the Century, showing Muhammad Ali outside Joe Frazier's training headquarters

- The Fight of the Century, March 8, 1971, between champion Joe Frazier and challenger Muhammad Ali
- The Concert for Bangladesh, August 1, 1971
- Elvis Presley's June 9–11, 1972 4 back to back sold-out concerts. One of his photos, taken during that week end, was enlarged in the shape of a three-story, 36x72 ft. billboard and unveiled at a Times Square building in New York City on April 1, 2008.
- Ali-Frazier II, January 28, 1974
- John Lennon's final live performance, November 28, 1974
- Pope John Paul II's papal mass at Madison Square Garden, October 3, 1979
- Wayne Gretzky's final game, April 18, 1999
- Subway Series of 2000
- The Concert for New York City to honor the victims of the September 11 attacks, October 20, 2001
- From the Big Apple to the Big Easy concert to raise funds for the Hurricane Katrina relief efforts, September 20, 2005

=== Honors and awards ===
- 2001 – Recipient of the highest award given by the photography industry (PMDA) as International Photographer of the Year.
- 2001 – Named "Sportsman of the Year" by the National Center for Disabilities, an organization for which he served as co-chairman.
- 2001 – Named "Man of the Year" by Pratt Institute, where he had been a design student.
- 2007 – Inducted into the National Jewish Sports Hall of Fame.
- 2008 – Recipient of Pratt Institute's Lifetime Achievement Award.
- 2010 – NYC Basketball Hall of Fame inductee.
- 2010 – Recipient of National Arts Club's Medal of Honor for Photography.
- 2015 – Recipient of New York Knicks' Dick McGuire Legacy Award.
- 2017 – Recipient of Pratt Institute's Legends Award.
- Served on the Fulbright Scholarship Foundation
- Included in New York Resident's list of top 100 New Yorkers.
