= Home Suite Home =

Studio album by Patrick Williams
- Released: October 2, 2015
- Genre: Jazz
- Length: 50:56
- Label: BFM Jazz / Varèse Sarabande

Home Suite Home is an album by Patrick Williams, released by BFM Jazz / Varèse Sarabande on October 2, 2015. It earned Williams a Grammy Award nomination for Best Large Jazz Ensemble Album.

== Track list ==
No.	Title	Length
1.	"52nd & Broadway"	3:23
2.	"Home Suite Home Pt. 1. Elizabeth (The Beautiful Scientist)"	6:08
3.	"Home Suite Home Pt. 2. Greer (The Dream"	7:50
4.	"Home Suite Home Pt. 3. Patrick B. (The Real Deal)"	7:49
5.	"A Hefti Dose of Basie (To the Memory of Neal Hefti)"	4:34
6.	"I’ve Been Around"	3:50
7.	"Blue Mist (For Catherine)"	10:24
8.	"That’s Rich (For Buddy)"	6:58

== Personnel ==
- Patti Austin - vocals
- Wayne Bergeron - trumpet
- Chuck Berghofer - bass
- Eric Boulanger - mastering
- Dave Crusin - piano
- Jeff Driskill - alto sax
- Peter Erskine - drums
- Daniel Fornero - trumpet
- Steve Genewick - engineer
- Craig Gosnell - bass trombone
- Dan Grecco - percussion
- Dan Higgins - alto sax
- Dusting Higgins - engineer
- Jason Lee - engineer, producer
- Charlie Loper - trombone
- Andrew Martin - trombone
- Bob McChesney - trombone
- Dean Parks - guitar
- Al Schmitt - engineer, mixing
- Tom Scott - tenor sax
- Bob Sheppard - tenor sax
- Frank Sinatra Jr. - vocals
- Joe Soldo - orchestra manager
- Michael Stever - trumpet
- Bob Summers - trumpet
- Tierney Sutton - vocals
- Patrick Williams - conductor, producer
