= That Face! =

Studio album by Frank Sinatra, Jr.
- Released: June 6, 2006
- Genre: Jazz
- Length: 47:14
- Label: Rhino Records

Frank Sinatra, Jr. chronology
As I Remember It (1996)	That Face! (2006)

Professional ratings
Review scores
Source	Rating
Allmusic	3.5/5 stars

That Face! is the final album by Frank Sinatra, Jr. and featuring Steve Tyrell.

The album was released on CD and features the younger Sinatra performing Great American Songbook tunes along with one self-written number, with arrangements by his father's longtime collaborators Nelson Riddle and Don Costa. Sinatra later expressed unhappiness with his vocals, stating they were recorded while he was undergoing treatment for prostate cancer.

== Track listing ==
1. "That Face" (Alan Bergman, Lew Spence) – 2:23
2. "I'm Afraid the Masquerade Is Over" (Herbert Magidson, Allie Wrubel) – 3:44
3. "Feeling Good" (Leslie Bricusse) – 3:08
4. "I Was a Fool (To Let You Go)" (Barry Manilow, Marty Panzer) – 3:22
5. "Spice" (Frank Sinatra, Jr.) – 3:28
6. "Girl Talk" (Bobby Troup) (featuring Steve Tyrell) – 4:53
7. "Cry Me a River" (Arthur Hamilton) – 5:45
8. "What a Diff'rence a Day Made" (María Grever, Stanley Adams) – 3:05
9. "You'll Never Know" (Harry Warren, Mack Gordon) – 2:58
10. "Softly, as in a Morning Sunrise" (Oscar Hammerstein II, Sigmund Romberg) – 3:38
11. "Trouble With Hello Is Goodbye" (Alan Bergman, Dave Grusin) – 3:40
12. "Walking Happy" (Sammy Cahn, Jimmy Van Heusen) – 2:42
13. "The People That You Never Get to Love" (Rupert Holmes) – 4:28
14. "And I Love You So" (Don McLean) – 4:06 (bonus track (special QVC CD))

== Personnel ==
- Frank Sinatra, Jr. - Vocals
- Steve Tyrell - Vocals
- Nelson Riddle - Arranger
- Don Costa - Arranger
