= Frank Sinatra Enterprises =

- Parent company: Warner Music Group
- Founded: 2007
- Founder: Sinatra family
- Distributor(s): Universal Music Group
- Genre: Various
- Country of origin: United States
- Official website: Sinatra.com

Frank Sinatra Enterprises LLC is a company jointly established in 2007 by Warner Music Group and the Sinatra family to manage the likeness rights to Frank Sinatra, as well as to own the singer's recordings catalog originally released on Reprise Records label he established. In 2013, it was announced that a deal was struck with Universal Music Group to combine those recordings with his work at Capitol Records from the 1950s under UMG imprint called Signature Sinatra. A series of events to celebrate Sinatra's centenary in 2015 was organized and entitled "Sinatra 100".

== History ==
Frank Sinatra Enterprises was founded in 2007 as the company which administers the rights for the usage of Frank Sinatra's recordings from his time spent on the Reprise Records label, as well as a number of other recordings, films and images. It also issues licences for the usage of Sinatra's name and likeness. It was formed by Warner Music Group alongside the Sinatra family; specifically his children, Frank Sinatra, Jr., Nancy Sinatra and Tina Sinatra.

Prior to the founding of the new label, Tina and attorney Robert A. Finkelstein were managing the Sinatra rights, but found that the work required a larger team to work on it. Under Frank Sinatra Enterprises, the duo hold the Sinatra family's two votes on the five person board, the others being represented at launch by the chief executive officer of Warner Music Group, Edgar Bronfman, Jr., president of Rhino Entertainment, Scott Pascucci, and a tie-breaking vote in the hands of former Capitol Records president Hale Milgrim. Under this agreement, Sinatra's Reprise Records recordings were released on Rhino Records within the United States, and internationally distributed from 2009 onwards by Universal Music Group.

In 2013, Frank Sinatra Enterprises and UMG agreed to jointly licence Sinatra's recordings on Reprise alongside those from his Capitol Records period; the former represents his recordings from the 1960s, while the latter are generally from the 1950s. The new releases were made under a new imprint entitled Signature Sinatra, which UMG managed and marketed. This replaced the Rhino releases within the United States of Sinatra's work. The first release under this new agreement was a re-release of the 1993 album Duets, expanded with further five further tracks.

== Sinatra 100 ==
To commemorate the Sinatra centenary on December 12, 2015, the Sinatra family alongside Frank Sinatra Enterprises planned a series of events throughout the year entitled "Sinatra 100". This included an exhibition running from March to September at the Lincoln Center called "Sinatra: An American Icon", alongside The Grammy Museum. After September 4, a national tour began. An exhibition of previously unseen photographs of Sinatra, called "The Sinatra Experience" was held at the Morrison Hotel Gallery in New York City during March.
