= Gladys Root =

Criminal defense attorney (1905–1982)

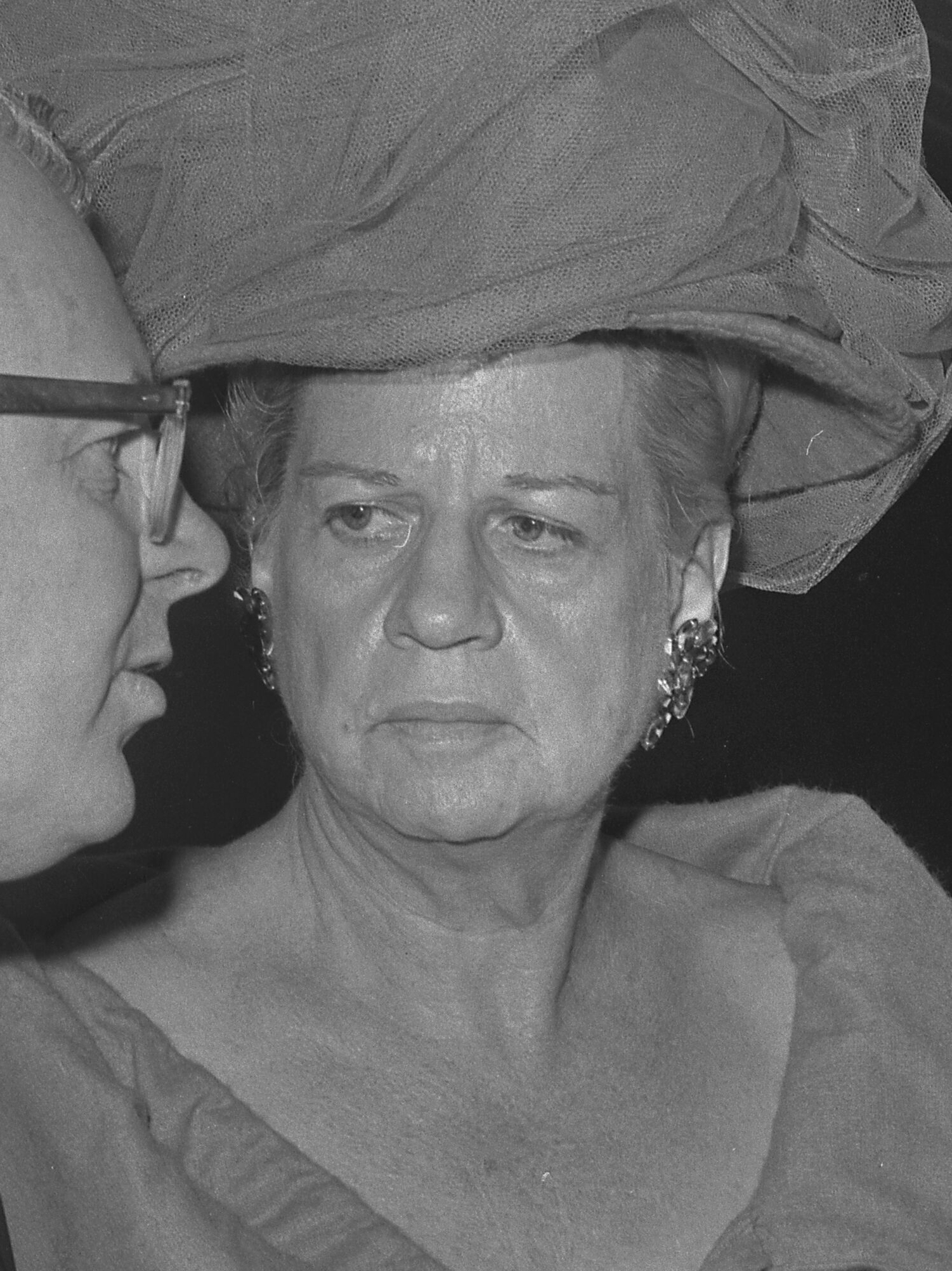
- Root in 1964
- Born: September 9, 1905; Los Angeles, California
- Died: December 21, 1982 (aged 77); Pomona, California
- Occupation: Criminal defense attorney
- Years active: 1930–1982
- Spouses: Frank Root (m. 1929; div. 1941) Jay C. Geiger (m. 1943)
- Children: 2

Gladys Towles Root (September 9, 1905 – December 21, 1982) was a criminal defense attorney in Los Angeles. Root specialized in sexual assault and murder cases, partly because those were the only clients available to a woman attorney at the time and partly because few other lawyers wanted to defend them.

== Early life ==
Root was the second daughter of Clara Dexter Towles and Charles Towles of Los Angeles. She was born in 1905 and grew up in comfortable surroundings.

There were very few women practicing law when Root graduated from USC School of Law in 1930. Root was unable to obtain employment and decided to open her own practice. Gladys Towles Root opened her office at 212 South Hill Street, Los Angeles California, the former location of the Rainbow Saloon.

Root became a defense attorney for rape and murder cases. She became so skilled that by the early 1960s young prosecutors and defense attorneys would gather to watch her cross-examination of prosecuting witnesses.

== Legal career ==
At age 25, Root defended her first client, Louis Osuna, in a murder trial. Osuna had hired Root to get a quick divorce from his wife but then, frustrated with the legal system, shot and killed his wife the next day. Root defended him in the murder trial and convinced the jury to convict him of manslaughter rather than first-degree murder. Afterward, Osuna introduced her to other inmates interested in her services.

In 1931, she successfully argued for a Filipino man and a Caucasian woman's right to marry, which was at that time illegal in the state of California. The law was declared unconstitutional. Root served as president of the Southern California Women Lawyers in 1945. At the height of her career, Root was handling 1,600 cases per year and averaging 75 court appearances per month. In July 1964 an indictment was issued against Gladys by a Federal Grand Jury in connection with her actions during her defense of one of the defendants in the kidnapping case of Frank Sinatra, Jr., the teenage son of Frank Sinatra. Three men had kidnapped Frank Sinatra Jr. from across the California-Nevada state line at Lake Tahoe and transported him to Los Angeles. The kidnappers collected $240,000 ransom. Gladys was hired to defend one of the kidnappers, John William Irwin. Charges were brought against Gladys based on her allegedly fabricating the story that the young singer concocted the kidnapping for publicity reasons. Gladys was indicted in 1964 on charges of conspiracy, suborning perjury, and obstruction of justice. The charges were dropped in 1968.

Root fought with the Internal Revenue Service, beginning in the 1970s. The IRS contended that she owed more than $230,000 in back taxes when interest and penalties were included. She fought the judgment and lost in the federal appeals court in 1977. She attempted to appeal to the United States Supreme Court, but the highest court in the land refused to hear the case.

She presented a flamboyant figure in the courtroom and was referred to as the "Lady in Purple." She was especially known for colorful hair and the large, dramatic hats she wore to court.

== Personal life ==
In 1929, she married sheriff’s Deputy Frank Root, with whom she had a son. They divorced in 1941, and in 1943 she married Jay C. Geiger, with whom she had a daughter in 1944.

On Tuesday, December 21, 1982, while in Los Angeles Superior Court, Pomona, defending one of two brothers accused of rape, Root suffered a heart attack; collapsed into the arms of her protégé David Brockway, who was defending the other brother; and died at age 77. Root was buried at Forest Lawn Glendale.
