= AJ Lambert =

American singer

- Born: Angela Jennifer Lambert; May 22, 1974 (age 52)
- Education: University of Southern California
- Children: 1
- Mother: Nancy Sinatra
- Relatives: Frank Sinatra (grandfather); Frank Sinatra Jr. (uncle); Tina Sinatra (aunt); Anthony Martin Sinatra (great-grandfather); Dolly Sinatra (great-grandmother)

Angela Jennifer "AJ" Lambert (born May 22, 1974) is an American musician. She is the daughter of Nancy Sinatra, the niece of Frank Sinatra Jr. and Tina Sinatra, and the granddaughter of Frank Sinatra. Her debut album, Careful You, was released in 2019.

== Early life ==
Angela Jennifer Lambert was born on May 22, 1974, the daughter of Nancy Sinatra and Hugh Lambert, and the granddaughter of Frank Sinatra. She has a younger sister, Amanda. Lambert's father died of cancer in 1985 when she was 11. Her family moved to Beverly Hills when she was 14, and she attended Beverly Hills High School. She graduated from the University of Southern California in 1996 with a degree in cinema.

== Career ==
Lambert began performing in indie, punk, and post‑punk bands in college, including Sleepington. After graduating, she moved to New York and continued performing in various bands while working day jobs. Through her 20s and 30s, she played in groups such as Looker, Here We Go Magic, and the reformed Homosexuals, usually in the rhythm section. She later sang in a lounge act in Hoboken that featured pop and indie covers. Lambert also worked as a music supervisor, including on projects for director Lee Daniels. She began focusing on singing in 2015. After the death of her uncle, Frank Sinatra Jr, in 2016, she started performing full‑album shows of her grandfather's work, including In the Wee Small Hours and Only the Lonely. She released her debut album, Careful You, at age 44 in 2019.

== Personal life ==
Lambert has said she struggled with alcoholism. She described blacking out almost every day and not remembering parts of her life or conversations. She later became sober.

Lambert married guitarist Matt Azzarto and later divorced. She had a daughter in 2011.
