= Anthony Martin Sinatra =

Father of Frank Sinatra (1892–1969)

- Born: Saverio Antonino Martino Sinatra; May 4, 1892; Brancaccio, Sicily, Italy
- Died: January 24, 1969 (aged 76); Houston, Texas, U.S.
- Resting place: Desert Memorial Park, Cathedral City, California
- Other name: Marty O'Brien
- Occupations: Fireman, professional boxer, bar owner
- Spouse: Dolly Garaventa (m. 1913)
- Children: Frank Sinatra
- Relatives: Nancy Sinatra (granddaughter); Frank Sinatra Jr. (grandson); Tina Sinatra (granddaughter); AJ Lambert (great-granddaughter)

Anthony Martin Sinatra (born Saverio Antonino Martino Sinatra; Italian pronunciation: [saˈvɛːrjo antoˈniːno marˈtiːno siˈnaːtra]; May 4, 1892 – January 24, 1969) was an Italian-American Hoboken city fireman, professional boxer, and bar owner. He was the father of entertainer Frank Sinatra.

== Biography ==
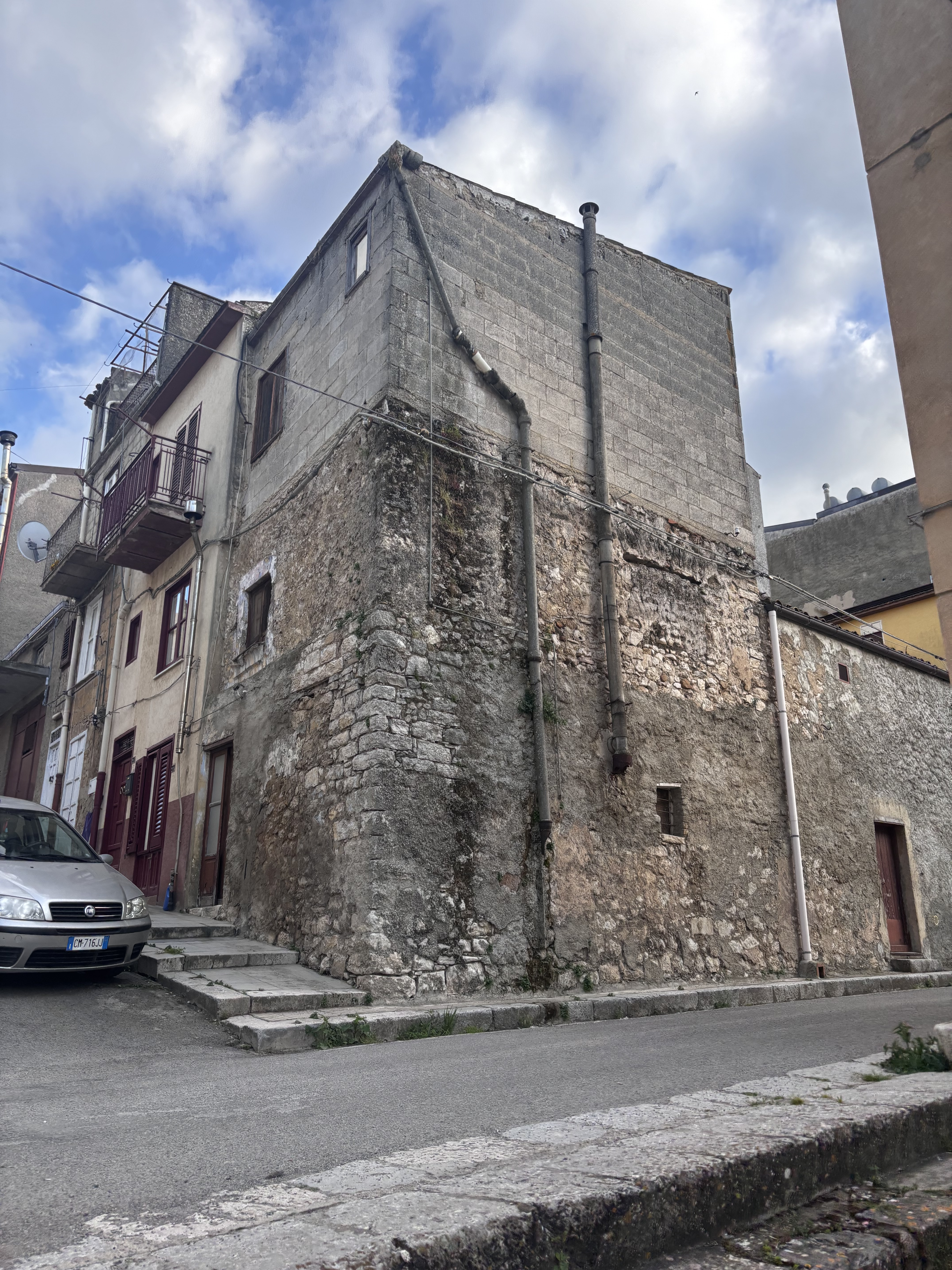
The ancestral house of the Sinatra Family

Sinatra was born on 4 May 1892 in Brancaccio, to Francesco Sinatra (1857–1947) and Rosa Saglimbeni (1857–1928). He was their 6th child.

On December 21, 1903, he emigrated to New York City from Catania, Sicily, on the SS Città di Milano with his mother Rosa Saglimbeni Sinatra, his sisters Angela and Dorotea, and his brother. His father, Francesco, born in Lercara Friddi, was already in the city working in a pencil factory earning eleven dollars a week, and his mother went on to own and operate a small grocery shop. Sinatra himself apprenticed as a shoemaker, until he started prize-fighting, calling himself Marty O'Brien, because Italians were not welcomed in boxing.

On February 14, 1913, Sinatra eloped with Natalie Garaventa (also known as "Dolly"), in Jersey City, New Jersey, as Dolly's parents refused to host a wedding and did not approve of Marty, as he was illiterate, inferior at boxing, and was a Sicilian, whereas the Garaventa family were Ligurian.

The couple eventually moved to 415 Monroe Street, Hoboken, New Jersey. Their only child, Francis Albert Sinatra, was born on December 12, 1915.

Sinatra continued his boxing career until he broke his wrists after 30 professional fights. He then attempted to find marine work but was rejected due to asthma. Dolly helped him find work as a fireman, and he was eventually appointed to the Hoboken Fire Department in 1927, where he attained the rank of Captain without having to take any formal exams.

While still a captain in the fire department, Sinatra and his wife opened a tavern, called Marty O'Brien's. With sufficient income, the family of three moved to a three-bedroom apartment, only a few blocks away from Monroe Street, but well out of Little Italy, at 703 Park Avenue.

== Death ==
Sinatra suffered a fatal heart attack on January 24, 1969 at a Houston hospital at age 76. He was buried at the Desert Memorial Park in Cathedral City, California; other family members, including Frank Sinatra and Anthony's wife are buried nearby.

== Popular culture ==
In the 1992 CBS miniseries Sinatra (a series about the life of his son Frank), he is portrayed by Joe Santos.
