= Dolly Sinatra =

Italian-American community leader and mother of Frank Sinatra

- Born: Natalina Maria Vittoria Garaventa; December 26, 1894; Lumarzo, Province of Genoa, Italy
- Died: January 6, 1977 (aged 82); San Gorgonio Wilderness, California, U.S.
- Burial place: Desert Memorial Park, Cathedral City, California
- Spouse: Anthony Martin Sinatra (m. 1913; died 1969)
- Children: Frank Sinatra
- Relatives: Nancy Sinatra (granddaughter); Frank Sinatra Jr. (grandson); Tina Sinatra (granddaughter); AJ Lambert (great-granddaughter)

Natalina Maria Vittoria "Dolly" Sinatra (Italian pronunciation: [siˈnaːtra]; née Garaventa; [nataˈliːna maˈriːa ɡaraˈvɛnta]; December 26, 1894 – January 6, 1977) was an Italian-American homemaker, known as the mother of American singer Frank Sinatra. She was born in Lumarzo (Province of Genoa), in northern Italy; she immigrated to the United States as an infant.

Dolly married Antonino Martino "Marty" Sinatra in 1913, and in 1915 the couple's only child, Frank Sinatra, was born. Dolly was influential in the Sinatras' neighborhood in Hoboken, New Jersey, where they later operated a tavern during Prohibition. She became involved in politics and worked as a midwife. It is believed that she also provided an illegal abortion service in the area. She died in a plane crash in 1977.

== Early life ==
Natalina Maria Vittoria Garaventa was born on December 26, 1894, in Lumarzo, Genoa, in northern Italy. She was brought to the United States when she was two months old. When she was a child, her pretty face earned her the nickname "Dolly". As an adult, she stood less than five feet tall and weighed approximately 90 pounds. Biographer James Kaplan describes her as having a "politician's temperament—restless, energetic, unreflective". Her father was a lithographer. He was also a peasant.

== Marriage and labor difficulties ==
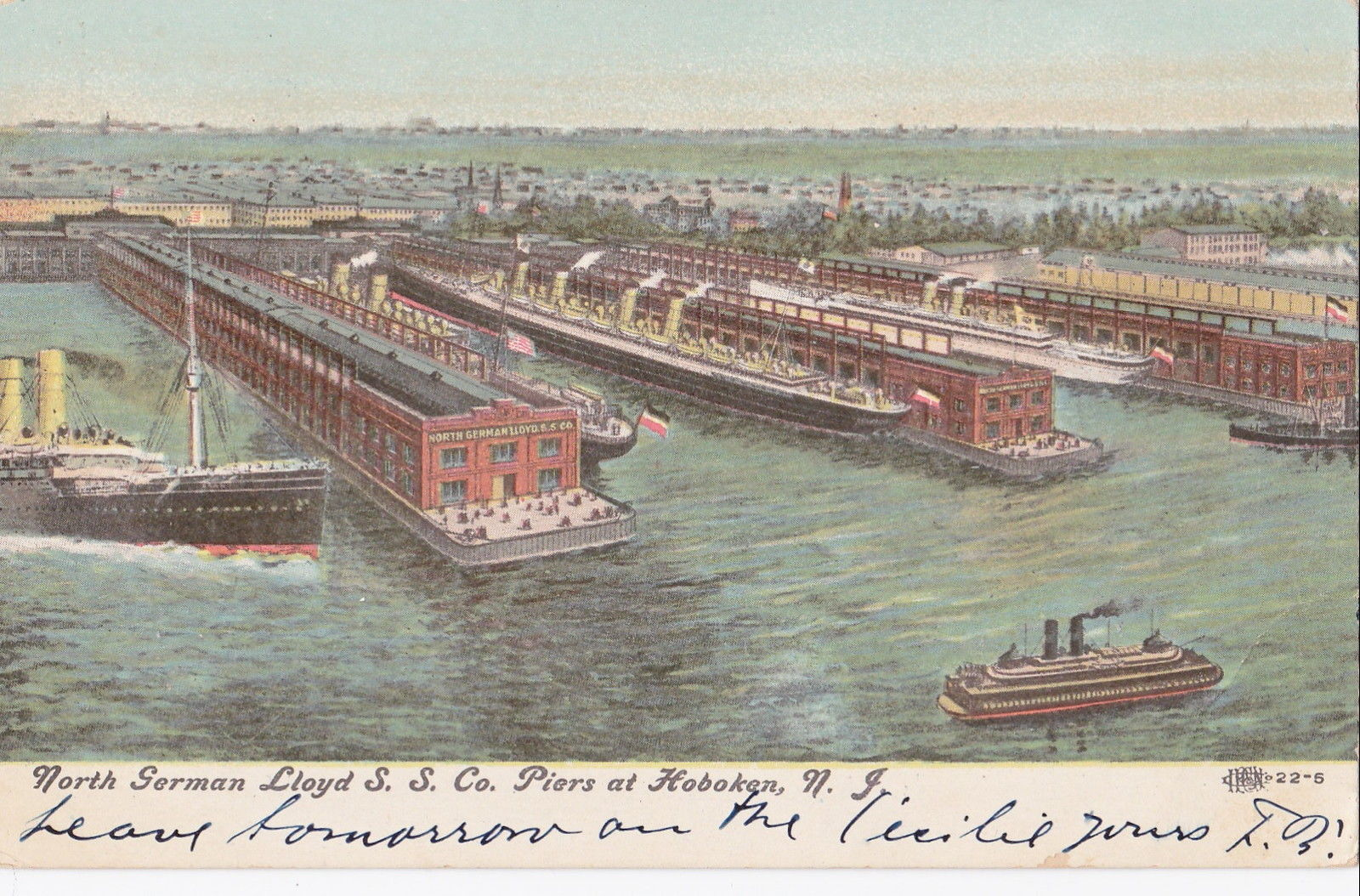
Hoboken, New Jersey, early 20th century

During her teen years, Dolly met Antonino Martino "Marty" Sinatra, born in Lercara Friddi, who immigrated from Catania, Sicily. Though her family opposed it, the couple eloped on Valentine's Day 1913, and were married at the city hall in Jersey City, New Jersey; they were later remarried in a church.

Dolly gave birth to Francis Albert Sinatra, the couple's only child, on December 12, 1915, in an upstairs tenement at 415 Monroe Street in Hoboken, New Jersey. Sinatra weighed 13.5 pounds (6.1 kg) at birth and had to be delivered with the aid of forceps, which caused severe scarring to his left cheek, neck, and ear, and perforated his ear drum, damage that remained for life. A childhood operation on his mastoid bone left major scarring on his neck, and during adolescence he suffered from cystic acne that scarred his face and neck. The family was Roman Catholic, but due to her son's injuries at birth, his baptism was delayed for several months.

== Politics ==
Dolly was influential in Hoboken and in local Democratic Party circles. She used her knowledge of Italian dialects and fluent English to translate for immigrants during court proceedings, particularly those pertaining to requests for citizenship. This earned her the respect of local politicians, who made her a Democratic ward leader. She was the first immigrant woman to hold that position in her local third ward, where she reliably delivered as many as six hundred votes for Democratic candidates. In 1919, she chained herself to city hall in support of the women's suffrage movement. She also worked as a midwife, earning $50 for each delivery, a fair amount of money at the time. These activities kept Dolly away from home during much of her son's childhood. According to Kaplan, Dolly also ran an illegal abortion service that earned her the nickname "Hatpin Dolly". Her reputation as an abortion care provider led one area church to ban her son from singing there.

== Tavern ==
In 1920, Prohibition of alcohol became law in the U.S. Dolly and Marty ran a tavern out of their Hoboken home during those years, allowed to operate openly by local officials who refused to enforce the law. Kaplan notes the possibility that the Sinatras procured their liquor from members of the American Mafia. They purchased the bar, which they named Marty O'Brien's, with money they borrowed from Dolly's parents. Sinatra later recalled spending time at the bar, working on his homework and occasionally singing a song on top of the player piano for spare change.

== Personal life ==
Dolly enjoyed gambling while visiting her son in Las Vegas. As she didn't like to lose they would often rig one of the slot machines so that she kept winning.

== Death ==
On January 6, 1977, Dolly Sinatra invited a friend, Anna Stack Carbone, to join her in a chartered flight provided by son Frank, to travel from Palm Springs to Las Vegas to see him perform and to do some gambling. Shortly after takeoff from Palm Springs Municipal Airport, the Gates Learjet 24 struck a 9,700 foot ridge on San Gorgonio Mountain in the San Gorgonio Wilderness. All aboard perished, including Sinatra (age 82), Carbone (age 67), Captain Donald J. Weier (36), and co-pilot Jerald W. Foley (43). The two members of the flight crew were from Las Vegas.

It was later concluded the crash was due to crew error. Because of darkness, freezing temperatures, and rugged terrain at the crash site, it took days for authorities to recover all the bodies. Dolly Sinatra was later interred at Desert Memorial Park in nearby Cathedral City, California, where her husband, Marty Sinatra, had been buried nearly a decade earlier.

== In popular culture ==
Dolly Sinatra was portrayed by Academy Award winning actress Olympia Dukakis in the 1992 biographical miniseries Sinatra.
