= Tina Sinatra =

American businesswoman (b. 1948)

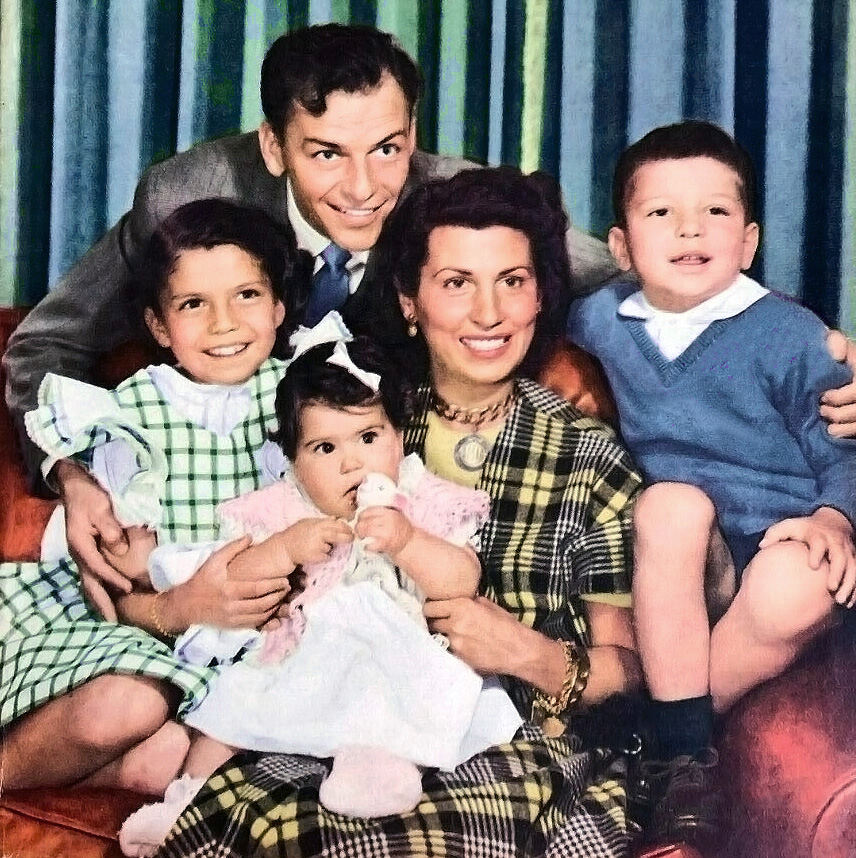
- Sinatra (in pink) with her parents and siblings Nancy and Frank Jr. in 1949
- Born: Christina Sinatra; June 20, 1948 (age 78); Los Angeles, California, U.S.
- Occupations: Actress; singer; author; producer
- Years active: 1968–2004
- Spouses: Wes Farrell (m. 1974; div. 1976) Richard M. Cohen (m. 1981; div. 1983)
- Father: Frank Sinatra
- Family: Nancy Sinatra (sister); Frank Sinatra Jr. (brother); AJ Lambert (niece); Anthony Martin Sinatra (grandfather); Dolly Sinatra (grandmother)

Christina "Tina" Sinatra (born June 20, 1948) is an American businesswoman, producer, talent agent, actress, singer and author. She is a daughter of Frank Sinatra.

== Early life ==
Christina Sinatra was born on June 20, 1948, in Los Angeles, California, the youngest child of American singer and actor Frank Sinatra and his first wife, Nancy Barbato Sinatra. She has two siblings, Nancy and Frank Jr. Her parents divorced when she was three years old.

== Career ==
Sinatra never wished to be a singer like her father and siblings, but she took acting classes with Jeff Corey and appeared with Hampton Fancher in the 1969 television miniseries Romeo und Julia '70 in Germany, where she lived with director/producer Michael Pfleghar for several years. After returning to the United States, she took more classes with Corey, and appeared in episodes of Adam-12, It Takes a Thief, McCloud, and Mannix.

Despite her hesitance to sing, Sinatra appeared on the album The Sinatra Family Wish You a Merry Christmas with her father and siblings in 1968. She contributed to five tracks on the album, including "Santa Claus Is Coming to Town" and a duet on "O Bambino (One Cold and Blessed Winter)", with her sister. Tina also appeared with her siblings on an episode of Dean Martin's television show with Martin's children. She was present at many of her father's recording sessions, including the session for the hit "My Way".

In her memoir, she wrote of her acting career that she lacked the ambition and confidence to become an actress. Sinatra remained in the entertainment industry, becoming a theatrical agent under Arnold Stiefel, and once represented Robert Blake. At her father's request, in the 1970s, she began to take charge of parts of the elder Sinatra's career. Upon her father's death, Tina took control of Frank Sinatra's film and music legacy.

An occasional film producer, she also appeared in the television movie Fantasy Island (1977), which became the pilot for the long-running TV series of the same title. She was executive producer of the 1992 television miniseries Sinatra. She was also a producer of the 2004 remake of her father's 1962 film The Manchurian Candidate. A lead actor in The Manchurian Candidate, Frank Sinatra owned the film's legal distribution rights until his death.

Sinatra published the memoir My Father's Daughter in 2000, co-written with Jeff Coplon.

== Personal life ==
In June 1970, Sinatra announced her engagement to actor Robert Wagner. They broke up in January 1972.

On January 26, 1974, Sinatra married musician Wes Farrell at her father's apartment at Caesars Palace in Las Vegas. They divorced on September 3, 1976.

On January 30, 1981, Sinatra married Richard M Cohen. They divorced on January 11, 1983.

Sinatra had a long-term relationship with actor James Farentino and secured a restraining order against him in 1994.

She started a petition in favor of the construction of the Beverly Hills Community Dog Park in Beverly Hills in 2015.
