= Frank Sinatra Jr. =

American singer, songwriter, conductor and actor (1944–2016)

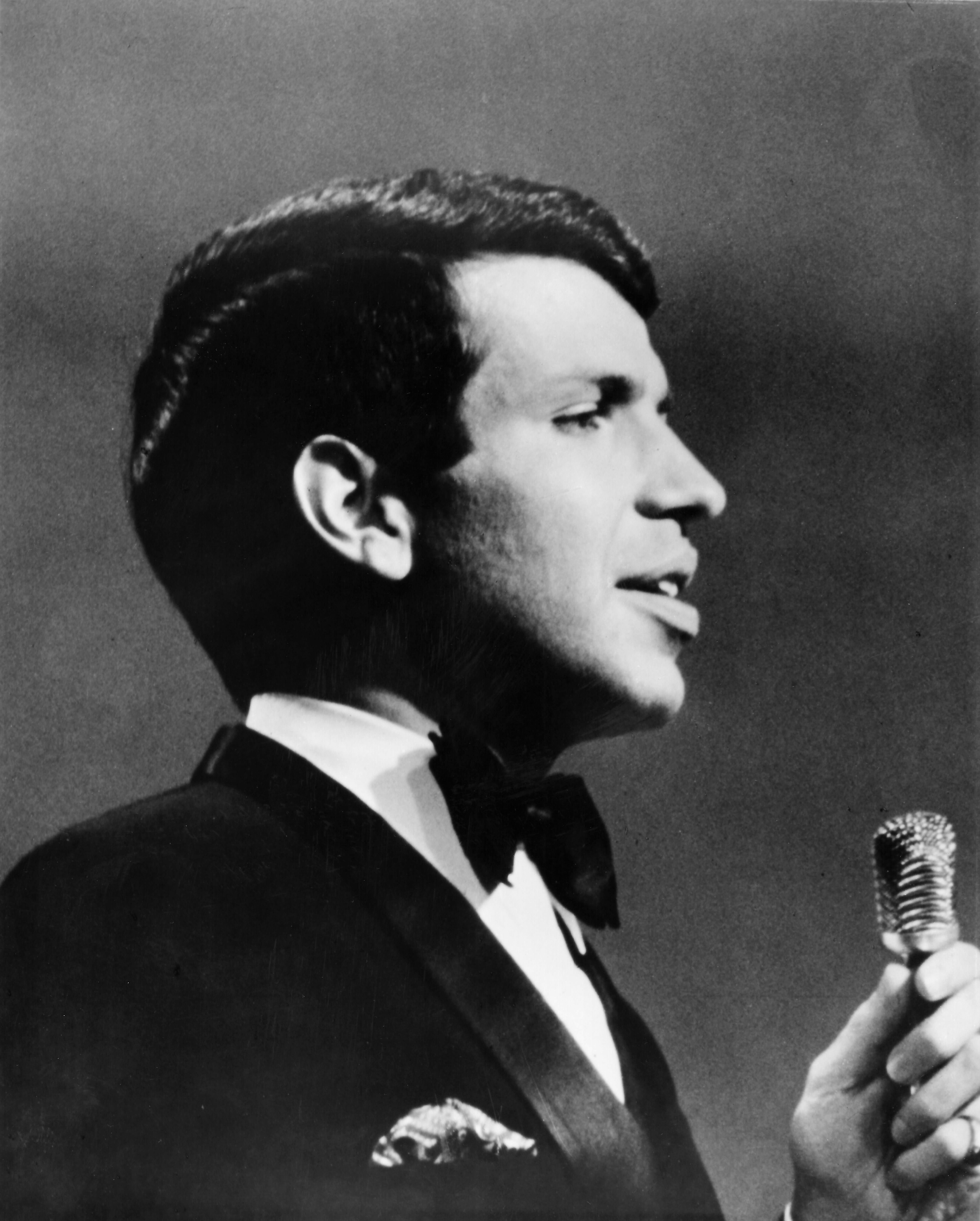
- Sinatra in 1972
- Born: Francis Wayne Sinatra; January 10, 1944; Jersey City, New Jersey, U.S.
- Died: March 16, 2016 (aged 72); Daytona Beach, Florida, U.S.
- Occupations: Singer; songwriter; conductor; actor
- Years active: 1963–2016
- Spouse: Cynthia McMurry (m. 1998; div. 2000)
- Children: 4
- Father: Frank Sinatra
- Relatives: Nancy Sinatra (sister); Tina Sinatra (sister); AJ Lambert (niece); Anthony Martin Sinatra (grandfather); Dolly Sinatra (grandmother)
- Musical career
- Genres: Jazz; big band
- Labels: Reprise; Rhino; Churchill; Daybreak; USA Music; Baybreak

Francis Wayne Sinatra (Note: Although some sources give his first name as Franklin, Francis Wayne Sinatra is his correct name, in accordance with his father's will and Nancy.) (/sɪˈnɑːtrə/; January 10, 1944 – March 16, 2016), known professionally as Frank Sinatra Jr., was an American jazz and big band singer, songwriter, conductor and actor. He was the second child and only son of singer and actor Frank Sinatra and his first wife, Nancy Barbato Sinatra, the younger brother of singer and actress Nancy Sinatra, and the older brother of television producer Tina Sinatra.

== Early life ==
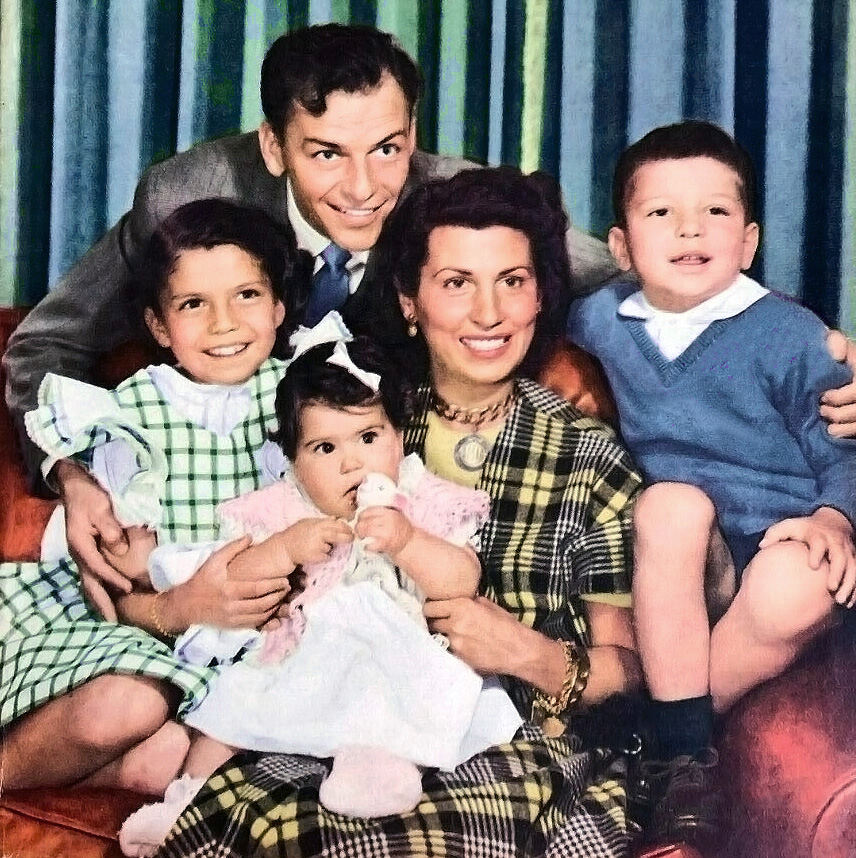
Sinatra family portrait, 1949, with Frank Jr. at far right

Francis Wayne Sinatra was born on January 10, 1944, in Jersey City, New Jersey, into the household of one of the most popular singers in the world, Frank Sinatra. The younger Sinatra was technically not a "junior", as his father's middle name was Albert, but was nonetheless known as Frank Jr. throughout his life. The younger Sinatra hardly saw his father, who was constantly on the road, either performing or working in films. Sinatra Jr. recalled wanting to become a pianist and songwriter from his earliest days.

=== Kidnapping ===
On December 8, 1963, Sinatra, 19 years old, was kidnapped from Harrah's Lake Tahoe (Room 417) and held for ransom. He was released two days later after his father paid the $240,000 ransom demanded by the kidnappers (equivalent to $2,520,000 in 2025). His father had offered $1 million (equivalent to $10,520,000 in 2025), but the kidnappers declined the larger offer. In a later interview with Ira Glass, kidnapper Barry Keenan said that he initially intended to earn back the ransom over years and pay it back to Sinatra's father. Keenan, Johnny Irwin, and Joe Amsler were soon captured, prosecuted for kidnapping, convicted, and sentenced to long prison terms, of which they served only small portions. Mastermind Keenan was later adjudged to have been legally insane at the time of the crime and hence not legally responsible for his actions. Famed attorney Gladys Root represented Irwin.

The kidnappers demanded that all communication be conducted by payphone. During these conversations, Sinatra's father became concerned that he would not have enough coins, which prompted him to carry 10 dimes with him at all times for the rest of his life; he was even buried with 10 dimes in his pocket.

At the time of the kidnapping, Sinatra's father and the Rat Pack were filming Robin and the 7 Hoods. The stress of the kidnapping, in addition to the assassination of his close friend John F. Kennedy just a few weeks prior to the kidnapping, caused Sinatra's father to seriously consider shutting down production, although the film was ultimately completed.

== Career ==
By his early teens Sinatra had begun performing at local clubs. At the age of 19, he became the vocalist for Sam Donahue's band. He also spent considerable time with Duke Ellington, learning the music business.

Sinatra spent most of his early career on the road. In 1965, he composed music for the film, the Beach Girls and the Monster. By 1968, he had performed in 47 states and 30 countries, had appeared as a guest on several television shows including two episodes of The Smothers Brothers Comedy Hour with his sister Nancy, hosted a 10-week summer replacement series for The Dean Martin Show, had sung with his own band in Las Vegas casinos, and had been the opening act for bigger names at other casinos. During that time, he gained a reputation for rigorous rehearsals and demanding high standards for his musicians.

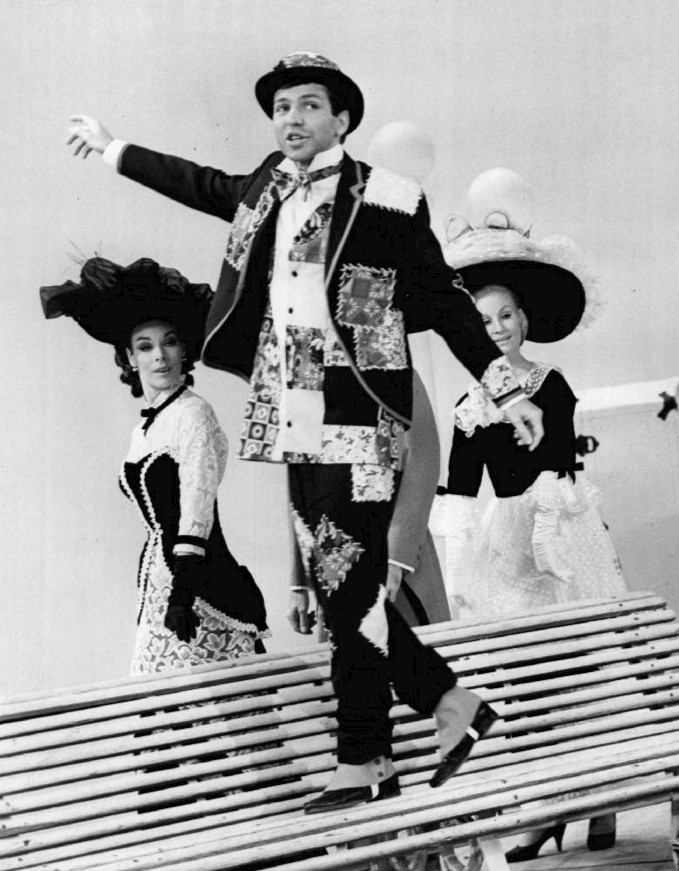
Sinatra on The Red Skelton Show in 1969

Sinatra appeared in the Sammy Davis Jr. drama A Man Called Adam in 1966. He also played a disturbed man who takes a stewardess hostage and later as officer Tom Boyd in three episodes of the television crime drama Adam-12, the last episode of which was titled "Clinic on 18th Street" (originally broadcast on March 13, 1974). This episode was an edited television pilot for a Mark VII Limited series that was not sold. His other acting credits included roles in Aru heishi no kake (1970) with Dale Robertson, Code Name Zebra (1987) opposite James Mitchum, and Hollywood Homicide (2003) with Harrison Ford and Josh Hartnett.

The United States National Archives now houses a 15-minute song and monologue composed by Sinatra in 1976, "Over the Land". It evokes the memory of the U.S. flag and the nation's experiences with the flag since the War of 1812.

Starting in 1988, at his father's request, Sinatra placed his career on hold in order to act as his father's musical director and conductor. Poet/vocalist Rod McKuen said:

As the senior Sinatra outlived one by one all of his conductors and nearly every arranger, and began to grow frail himself, his son knew he needed someone that he trusted near him. [Frank Jr.] was also savvy enough to know that performing was everything to his dad and the longer he kept that connection with his audience, the longer he would stay vital and alive.

In 1989, Sinatra sang "Wedding Vows in Vegas" on the Was (Not Was) album, What Up, Dog?, and performed the song live with the band on Late Night with David Letterman on March 23, 1989.

During the 1997–1998 television season, Sinatra was offered the role of Vic Fontaine on Star Trek: Deep Space Nine. Despite being a fan of the show and finding the role interesting, he turned it down, declaring that he only wanted to play an alien. James Darren accepted the part, after refusing three times because he found the idea of a vocalist playing a vocalist to be too "on the nose", but changed his mind when he read the script.

Sinatra guest-starred in an episode of Son of the Beach, in the episode "You Only Come Once" (2002), playing the villain Stink Finger, and he sang his own theme song for the character. He had a guest spot playing himself in an episode of The Sopranos, "The Happy Wanderer" (2000), in a role either mocking or acknowledging all the stories about his father's involvement with the mob – he lets Paulie Walnuts refer to him as the "Chairboy of the Board".

Sinatra appeared in the show Family Guy, season 4, episode 19: "Brian Sings and Swings", wherein he was introduced as the "Member of the Board". He performed several tunes during the show, accompanied by Stewie and Brian. During the ending credits, he sang the Family Guy theme song. He also recorded a commentary for its DVD release.

He returned in a 2008 episode, "Tales of a Third Grade Nothing" (Season 7, Episode 6), wherein he sang with Brian again, with Stewie returning as a sideline investor supporting the duo. A third episode featuring Sinatra, "Bookie of the Year" (Season 15, Episode 2), aired posthumously on October 2, 2016, and was dedicated to his memory. This was his final screen appearance.

In 2006, Sinatra released the album That Face!, including the songs "You'll Never Know" and the self-penned song "Spice".

Sinatra made a brief cameo appearance in the series premiere episode of the 2010 CBS legal comedy-drama The Defenders, as well as the show's series finale.

On August 17, 2015, Sinatra sang "The Star-Spangled Banner" at Yankee Stadium. and sang the "Theme from New York, New York" at the 2014 Belmont Stakes.

Sinatra appeared with Tierney Sutton on Patrick Williams' 2015 CD Home Suite Home, performing "I've Been Around." It is believed to be his last studio session. The recording earned a Grammy Award nomination for Best Large Jazz Ensemble Album.

Sinatra's song "Black Night", written and sung by him, was used as the theme song to Rick Alverson's feature film Entertainment (2015), starring Gregg Turkington and John C. Reilly.

== Personal life ==
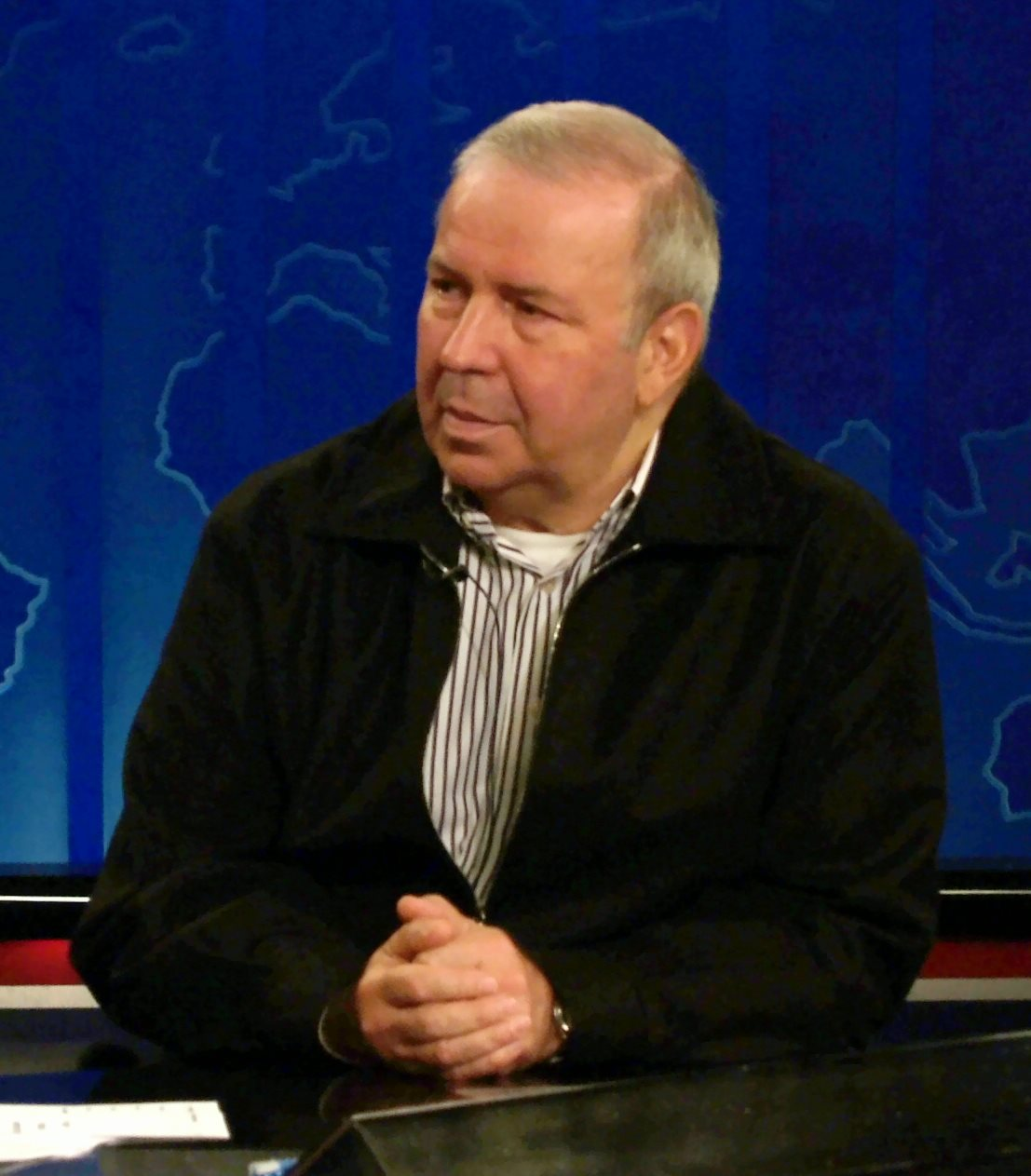
Sinatra in 2008

Sinatra married Cynthia McMurry on October 18, 1998. They divorced on January 7, 2000.

Sinatra underwent surgery for prostate cancer in January 2006.

== Death ==
On March 16, 2016, the Sinatra family released a statement to the Associated Press that Sinatra had died unexpectedly of cardiac arrest while on tour in Daytona Beach, Florida, at the age of 72. One biological son of Sinatra was acknowledged in his obituary and confirmed in other sources, but three other children unacknowledged by him claimed his parentage.

== Critical reception ==
Sinatra said that his famous name had opened some doors, but "a famous father means that in order to prove yourself, you have to work three times harder than the guy off the street."

Music critic Richard Ginell wrote of a 2003 concert by Sinatra:

Sinatra, Jr. might have had an easier time establishing himself had he gone into real estate. But his show made me awfully glad he decided music was his calling. There aren't too many singers around with Sinatra's depth of experience in big band music, or his knowledge of the classic American songbook. There are even fewer with such real feeling for the lyrics of a song, and such a knack for investing a song with style and personality.

== Songs ==
Sinatra composed several songs, including:

- "Spice"
- "Believe in Me"
- "Black Night"
- "What Were You Thinking?"
- "Missy"

== Discography ==
- Young Love For Sale (LP, Reprise Records, 1965)
- The Sinatra Family Wish You a Merry Christmas (LP, Reprise, 1968) – 4 tracks
- Spice (LP, Daybreak Records, 1971)
- His Way! (LP, Daybreak, 1972)
- It's Alright (LP, Churchill Records, 1977)
- Pat Longo's Super Big Band featuring Frank Sinatra Jr. – Billy May For President (LP, Townhall Records, 1983)
- Pat Longo's Super Big Band featuring Frank Sinatra Jr. – Here's That Swing Thing (LP, USA Music Group, 1991)
- As I Remember It (CD, Angel Records, 1996)
- That Face! (CD, Rhino Entertainment, 2006)

Guest performances

- Dora Hall – Once Upon a Tour (1971)
- Was (Not Was) – What Up, Dog? (1989)
- Gumby (1989)
- Frank Sinatra – Duets II (1994)
- Louise Baranger Jazz Band – Trumpeter's Prayer (1998)
- Steve Tyrell – Songs of Sinatra (2005)
- Patrick Williams – Home Suite Home (2015)
